= List of New Testament lectionaries (1–500) =

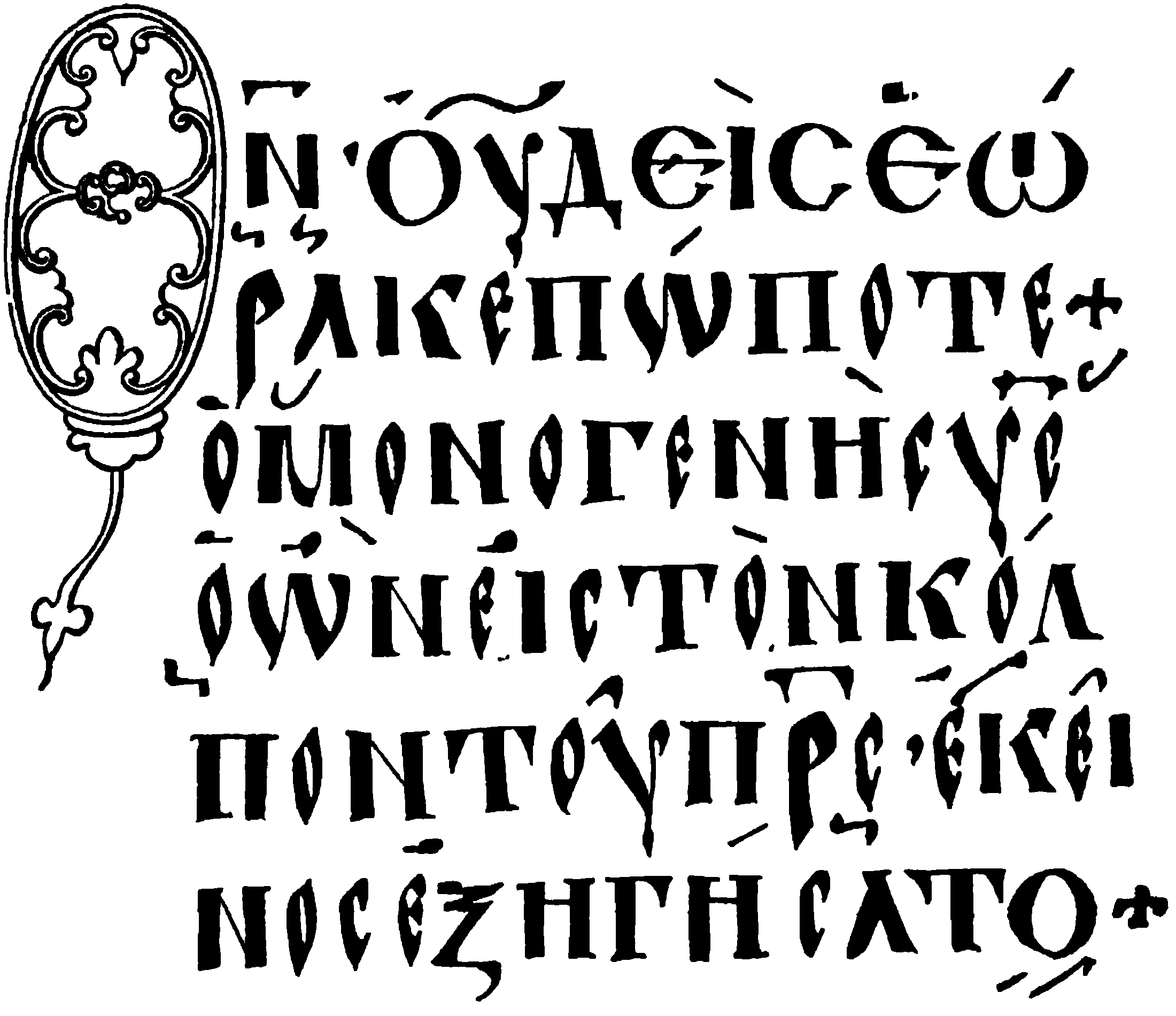
Codex Harcleianus (Lectionary 150)

A New Testament Lectionary is a handwritten copy of a lectionary, or book of New Testament Bible readings. Lectionaries may be written in majuscule or minuscule Greek letters, on parchment, papyrus, vellum, or paper.

Lectionaries which have the Gospels readings are called Evangeliaria or Evangelistaria, those which have the Acts or Epistles, Apostoli or Praxapostoli. They appear from the 6th century.

Before Scholz only 57 Gospel lectionaries and 20 Apostoloi were known. Scholz added to the list 58-181 Evangelistarioi and 21-58 Apostoloi. Gregory in 1909 enumerated 2234 lectionaries. To the present day 2484 lectionary manuscripts have been catalogued by the (INTF) in Münster.

Below is the list of lectionary 1 to 500. For other related lists, see:

- List of New Testament lectionaries
- List of New Testament lectionaries (501–1000)
- List of New Testament lectionaries (1001–1500)
- List of New Testament lectionaries (1501–2000)

== Legend ==
- The numbers (#) are the now standard system of Caspar René Gregory (Gregory–Aland).
- Dates are estimated to the nearest century (except lectionaries dated by scribes which are shown in the Date column).
- Content only the Gospel lessons (Evangelistarion), and other lessons from the rest of the NT apart from Revelation (Apostolos). Sometimes the surviving portion of a codex is so limited that specific books, chapters or even verses can be indicated. Linked articles, where they exist, generally specify content in detail, by verse.
- Digital images are referenced with direct links to the hosting web pages. The quality and accessibility of the images is as follows:

Gold color indicates high resolution color images available online.
Tan color indicates high resolution color images available locally, not online.
Light tan color indicates only a small fraction of manuscript pages with color images available online.
Light gray color indicates black/white or microfilm images available online.
Light blue color indicates manuscript not imaged, and is currently lost or ownership unknown.
Light pink color indicates manuscript destroyed, presumed destroyed, or deemed too fragile to digitize.
Violet color indicates high resolution ultraviolet images available online.

Contents Legend:
† Indicates the manuscript has damaged or missing pages.
^{P} Indicates only a portion of the original book remains.
^{K} Indicates manuscript also includes commentary notes.
^{sel} Indicates contents include Scripture readings for selected days only.
^{e} Indicates contents include weekday Scripture readings.
^{esk} Indicates contents include weekday Scripture readings from Easter to Pentecost and Saturday/Sunday readings for other weeks.
^{sk} Indicates contents include only Saturday and Sunday Scripture readings.
^{Lit} Indicates Liturgical book containing an assortment of New Testament texts.
^{PsO} Indicates a Psalter with Biblical Odes.
[ ] Brackets around Gregory-Aland number indicates, that the number is not longer in use.

Script Legend:
ΑΩ indicates Majuscule script
αω indicates Minuscule script
P^{U} indicates manuscript is a palimpsest and script is the text under the later script.
P^{O} indicates manuscript is a palimpsest and script is the text over the prior script.

== List of named or notable lectionaries ==
=== Lectionaries 1–100 ===
#	Date	Contents	Script	Pages	Institution	City, State	Country	Images
ℓ 1	10th	†Gospels^{sel}	ΑΩ	265	National Library, Grec 278	Paris	France	BnF
ℓ 2	10th	†Gospels^{e}	ΑΩ	257	National Library, Grec 280	Paris	France	BnF
ℓ 3	11th	†Gospels^{esk}	ΑΩ	281	Lincoln College, Gr. 15	Oxford	UK	INTF
ℓ 4	11th	Gospels^{esk}	αω	199	Cambridge University Library, Dd. 8.49	Cambridge	UK	INTF
ℓ 5	10th	†Gospels^{esk}	ΑΩ	150	Bodleian Library, MS. Barocci 202	Oxford	UK	DB
ℓ 5	10th	†Gospels^{esk}	ΑΩ	150	Bodleian Library, MS. Barocci 202	Oxford	UK	INTF
ℓ 6	1265	Gospels + Apostles^{sel}	ΑΩ	275	Leiden University Library, Or. 243	Leiden	Netherlands	INTF
ℓ 7	1204	Gospels^{e}	αω	316	National Library, Grec 301	Paris	France	BnF
ℓ 8	14th	Gospels^{e}	αω	309	National Library, Grec 312	Paris	France	BnF
ℓ 9	13th	Gospels^{e}	αω	260	National Library, Grec 307	Paris	France	BnF
ℓ 10	13th	†Gospels^{sel}	αω	142	National Library, Grec 287	Paris	France	BnF
ℓ 11	13th	†Gospels^{esk}	αω	142	National Library, Grec 309	Paris	France	BnF
ℓ 12	13th	†Gospels^{e}	αω	366	National Library, Grec 310	Paris	France	BnF, INTF
ℓ 13	12th	Gospels^{esk}	ΑΩ	283	National Library, Coislin 31	Paris	France	BnF
ℓ 14	16th	Gospels^{e}	αω	348	National Library, Grec 315	Paris	France	BnF
ℓ 15	13th	Gospels^{e}	αω	310	National Library, Grec 302	Paris	France	BnF
ℓ 16	12th	Gospels^{esk}	αω	199	National Library, Grec 297	Paris	France	INTF
ℓ 17	9th	†Gospels^{esk}	ΑΩ	192	National Library, Grec 279	Paris	France	BnF, INTF
ℓ 18	12th	†Gospels^{e}	αω	276	Bodleian Library, MS. Laud. Gr. 32	Oxford	UK	INTF
ℓ 19	13th	†Gospels^{e}	αω	332	Bodleian Library, MS. Auct. D. inf. 2. 12	Oxford	UK	INTF
ℓ 20	1047	†Gospels^{esk}	αω	177	Bodleian Library, MS. Laud. Gr. 34	Oxford	UK	INTF
ℓ 21	14th	†Matthew, †Luke	αω	59	Bodleian Library, MS. Arch. Selden. B. 56	Oxford	UK	INTF
ℓ 22	14th	†John	αω	63	Bodleian Library, MS. Arch. Selden. B. 54, fol. 155-217	Oxford	UK	INTF
ℓ 23	11th	†Apostles^{esk}	αω	230	British Library, Cotton MS Vespasian B XVIII	London	UK	INTF
ℓ 24	10th	†Gospels^{esk}	ΑΩ	265	Bavarian State Library, Cod.graec. 383	Munich	Germany	BSB, INTF
ℓ 25	13th	†Gospels^{esk}	αω P^{O}	159	British Library, Harley MS 5650	London	UK	BL
ℓ 26	13th	†Gospels^{esk}	αω P^{O}	180	Bodleian Library, Selden Supra 2	Oxford	UK	INTF
ℓ 27	14th	†Matthew, †Luke	αω P^{O}	150	Bodleian Library, Selden Supra 3	Oxford	UK	INTF
ℓ 28	13th	†Gospels^{esk}	αω	198	Bodleian Library, MS. Auct. D. inf. 2. 14	Oxford	UK	INTF
ℓ 29	12th	†Gospels^{esk}	αω	156	Bodleian Library, MS. Auct. D. inf. 2. 15	Oxford	UK	INTF
ℓ 30	1225	Gospels + Apostles^{Lit}	αω	105	Bodleian Library, Cromwell MS 11, p. 149-340	Oxford	UK	INTF
ℓ 31	12th	Gospels^{esk}	αω	281	Library, Ms. Cent. V. App. 40	Nuremberg	Germany	INTF
ℓ 32	11th	Gospels^{esk}	αω	273	Landesbibliothek, Memb. I 78	Gotha	Germany	INTF
[ℓ 33]= ℓ 563								
ℓ 34	9th	†Gospels^{e}	ΑΩ	430	Bavarian State Library, Cod.graec. 329	Munich	Germany	BSB, INTF
ℓ 35	11th	†Gospels^{sel}	ΑΩ	151	Vatican Library, Vat. gr. 351	Vatican City	Vatican	DVL
ℓ 35	11th	†Gospels^{sel}	ΑΩ	151	Vatican Library, Vat. gr. 351	Vatican City	Vatican	INTF
ℓ 36	10th	†Gospels^{e}	ΑΩ	268	Vatican Library, Vat. gr. 1067	Vatican City	Vatican	INTF
ℓ 37	12th	†Gospels^{esk}	αω	184	Vatican Library, Borg. gr. 6	Vatican City	Vatican	DVL
ℓ 37	12th	†Gospels^{esk}	αω	184	Vatican Library, Borg. gr. 6	Vatican City	Vatican	INTF
ℓ 38	15th	†Apostles^{esk}	αω	56	University of Göttingen, Cod. Ms. theol. 33	Göttingen	Germany	INTF
ℓ 39	13th	Gospels + Apostles^{esk}	αω	139	National Library, Supplement Grec 104	Paris	France	BnF, INTF
ℓ 40	10th	†Gospels^{esk}	ΑΩ	207	Escorial, Ψ. III. 14	El Escorial	Spain	INTF
ℓ 41	11th	Gospels^{esk}	ΑΩ	204	Escorial, X. III. 12	El Escorial	Spain	INTF
ℓ 42	10th	†Gospels^{esk}	ΑΩ	224	Escorial, X. III. 13	El Escorial	Spain	INTF
ℓ 43	13th	†Gospels^{e}	αω	313	Escorial, X. III. 16	El Escorial	Spain	INTF
ℓ 44	12th	Gospels + Apostles^{sk}	αω	195	Royal Danish Library, GKS 1324, 4°	Copenhagen	Denmark	INTF
ℓ 45	10th	Gospels^{P}	ΑΩ	6	Austrian National Library, Cod. Jur. gr. 5, fol. 575-580	Vienna	Austria	INTF
ℓ 46	9th	Gospels^{sel}	ΑΩ	182	Victor Emmanuel III National Library, Cod. Neapol. ex Vind. 2	Naples	Italy	INTF
ℓ 47	10th	Gospels^{esk}	ΑΩ	246	State Historical Museum, V. 11, S. 42	Moscow	Russia	INTF
ℓ 48	1055	Gospels^{e}	αω	250	State Historical Museum, V. 15, S. 43	Moscow	Russia	INTF
ℓ 49	10th/11th	Gospels^{e}	αω	437	State Historical Museum, V. 12, S. 225	Moscow	Russia	INTF
ℓ 50	14th	†Gospels^{esk}	ΑΩ	231	State Historical Museum, V. 10, S. 226	Moscow	Russia	INTF
ℓ 51	14th	†Gospels^{P}	αω	44	State Historical Museum, V. 20, S. 224	Moscow	Russia	INTF
ℓ 52	14th	Gospels + Apostles^{Lit}	αω	244	State Historical Museum, V. 261, S. 279	Moscow	Russia	
ℓ 53	15th	Gospels + Apostles^{Lit}	αω	332	State Historical Museum, V. 262, S. 280	Moscow	Russia	
ℓ 54	1470	Gospels + Apostles^{Lit}	αω	344	State Historical Museum, V. 263, S. 281	Moscow	Russia	
ℓ 55	1602	Gospels + Apostles^{Lit}	αω	581	State Historical Museum, V. 264, S. 454	Moscow	Russia	
ℓ 56	15th/16th	Gospels + Apostles^{Lit}	αω	462	State Historical Museum, V. 392, S. 466	Moscow	Russia	INTF
ℓ 57	15th	Apostles^{Lit}	αω	408	Saxon State Library, A. 151	Dresden	Germany	CSNTM
ℓ 57	15th	Apostles^{Lit}	αω	408	Saxon State Library, A. 151	Dresden	Germany	SSL
ℓ 58	16th	Gospels^{Lit}	αω	49	National Library, Supplement Grec 50	Paris	France	BnF
ℓ 59	11th	Apostles^{e}	αω	311	State Historical Museum, V. 21, S. 4	Moscow	Russia	INTF
ℓ 60	1021	Gospels + Apostles^{esk}	αω	195	National Library, Grec 375	Paris	France	BnF, CSNTM
ℓ 61	12th	†Gospels^{P}	αω	1	National Library, Grec 182	Paris	France	BnF
ℓ 62	12th	†Apostles^{e}	αω	276	State Historical Museum, V. 22, S. 304	Moscow	Russia	INTF
ℓ 63	9th	†Gospels^{esk}	ΑΩ	158	National Library, Grec 277	Paris	France	BnF
ℓ 64	9th	†Gospels^{esk}	ΑΩ	210	National Library, Grec 281	Paris	France	BnF
ℓ 65	9th	Gospels	ΑΩ P^{U}	213	National Library, Grec 282	Paris	France	BnF
ℓ 66	9th	Gospels	ΑΩ P^{U}	275	National Library, Grec 283	Paris	France	BnF
ℓ 67	12th	†Gospels^{P}	αω	270	National Library, Grec 284	Paris	France	BnF
ℓ 68	12th	†Gospels^{e}	αω	357	National Library, Grec 285	Paris	France	BnF
ℓ 69	12th	†Gospels^{e}	αω	257	National Library, Grec 286	Paris	France	BnF, INTF
ℓ 70	12th	†Gospels^{e}	αω	313	National Library, Grec 288	Paris	France	BnF
ℓ 71	1066	†Gospels^{esk}	αω	159	National Library, Grec 289	Paris	France	BnF, INTF
ℓ 72	13th	Gospels^{esk}	αω	187	National Library, Grec 290, fol. 4-190	Paris	France	BnF
ℓ 73	12th	†Gospels^{P}	αω	34	National Library, Grec 291	Paris	France	BnF
ℓ 74	12th	Gospels^{esk}	αω	274	National Library, Grec 292	Paris	France	BnF
ℓ 75	12th	Gospels^{e}	αω	250	National Library, Grec 293	Paris	France	BnF
ℓ 76	12th	†Gospels^{e}	αω	182	National Library, Grec 295	Paris	France	INTF
ℓ 77	12th	†Gospels^{esk}	αω	258	National Library, Grec 296	Paris	France	BnF
ℓ 78	12th	†Gospels^{esk}	αω	95	National Library, Grec 298	Paris	France	BnF
ℓ 79	14th	†Gospels^{e}	αω	126	National Library, Grec 299	Paris	France	BnF, INTF
ℓ 80	12th	Gospels^{e}	αω	128	National Library, Grec 300	Paris	France	BnF
ℓ 81	14th	†Gospels^{esk}	αω	197	National Library, Grec 305	Paris	France	INTF
ℓ 82	14th	†Gospels + Apostles^{esk}	αω	150	National Library, Grec 276	Paris	France	BnF
ℓ 83	12th	†Gospels^{e}	αω	245	National Library, Grec 294	Paris	France	BnF
ℓ 84	13th	Gospels + Apostles^{Lit}	αω	212	National Library, Supplement Grec 32	Paris	France	BnF
ℓ 85	12th	†Gospels + Apostles^{Lit}	αω	248	National Library, Supplement Grec 33	Paris	France	BnF
ℓ 86	1336	†Gospels^{e}	αω	382	National Library, Grec 311	Paris	France	BnF
ℓ 87	14th	†Gospels^{esk}	αω	121	National Library, Grec 313	Paris	France	BnF
ℓ 88	14th	†Gospels^{esk}	αω	188	National Library, Grec 314, fol. 1-178, 181-190	Paris	France	BnF
ℓ 89	14th	†Gospels^{esk}	αω	208	National Library, Grec 316	Paris	France	BnF
ℓ 90	1533	†Gospels^{esk}	αω	223	National Library, Grec 317	Paris	France	BnF
ℓ 91	14th	†Gospels^{esk}	αω	322	National Library, Grec 318	Paris	France	BnF
ℓ 92	14th	†Gospels + Apostles^{Lit}	αω	212	National Library, Grec 324	Paris	France	BnF
ℓ 93	16th	†Gospels^{Lit}	αω	144	National Library, Grec 326	Paris	France	BnF
ℓ 94	12th	†Gospels + Apostles^{Lit}	αω	176	National Library, Grec 330	Paris	France	BnF
ℓ 95	14th	†Gospels^{esk}	αω	114	National Library, Grec 374	Paris	France	BnF
ℓ 96	16th	†Gospels + Apostles^{Lit}	αω	171	National Library, Supplement Grec 115	Paris	France	BnF
ℓ 97	14th	†Apostles^{e}	αω	145	National Library, Grec 376, fol. 1-145	Paris	France	BnF
ℓ 98	15th	†Gospels^{esk}	αω P^{O}	196	National Library, Grec 377	Paris	France	BnF
ℓ 99	16th	†Gospels^{esk}	αω	243	National Library, Grec 380	Paris	France	BnF
ℓ 100	1550	Gospels^{esk}	αω	306	National Library, Grec 381	Paris	France	BnF

[top]

=== Lectionaries 101–200 ===
#	Date	Contents	Script	Pages	Institution	City, State	Country	Images
ℓ 101	14th	†Gospels^{e}	αω	279	National Library, Grec 303	Paris	France	INTF
ℓ 102	1370	Gospels^{k K}	αω	116	Ambrosiana Library, S. 62 sup.	Milan	Italy	INTF
ℓ 103	13th	Gospels^{esk}	αω	138	Ambrosiana Library, D. 67 sup.	Milan	Italy	INTF
ℓ 104	12th	Gospels + Apostles^{e}	αω	128	Ambrosiana Library, D. 72 sup.	Milan	Italy	INTF
ℓ 105	13th	†Gospels^{esk}	αω	157	Ambrosiana Library, M. 81 sup.	Milan	Italy	INTF
ℓ 106	13th	†Gospels^{esk}	αω	349	Ambrosiana Library, C. 91 sup.	Milan	Italy	INTF
ℓ 107	12th	Gospels^{esk}	αω	265	Marciana National Library, Gr. Z. 548 (787)	Venice	Italy	INTF
ℓ 108	11th	†Gospels^{e}	αω	292	Marciana National Library, Gr. Z. 549 (655)	Venice	Italy	INTF
ℓ 109	14th	Gospels^{e}	αω	206	Marciana National Library, Gr. Z. 550 (848)	Venice	Italy	INTF
ℓ 110	13th	Gospels^{esk}	αω	279	Marciana National Library, Gr. Z. 551 (826)	Venice	Italy	INTF
ℓ 111	9th	Gospels^{esk}	ΑΩ	288	Estense Library, Gr. 73 α.W.2.6	Modena	Italy	INTF
ℓ 112	11th	Gospels + Apostles^{esk}	αω	148	Laurentian Library, Conv. Soppr. 24	Florence	Italy	CSNTM, INTF
ℓ 112	11th	Gospels + Apostles^{esk}	αω	148	Laurentian Library, Conv. Soppr. 24	Florence	Italy	CSNTM
ℓ 113	13th	†Gospels^{e}	αω	341	Laurentian Library, Plut.06.02	Florence	Italy	BML, INTF
ℓ 114	14th	Gospels^{k}	αω	180	Laurentian Library, Plut.06.07	Florence	Italy	BML, INTF
ℓ 115	10th	Gospels^{esk}	ΑΩ	261	Laurentian Library, Plut.06.21	Florence	Italy	BML, INTF
ℓ 116	10th	Gospels^{esk}	ΑΩ	226	Laurentian Library, Plut.06.31	Florence	Italy	BML, INTF
ℓ 117	11th	Gospels^{sel}	αω	119	Laurentian Library, Mediceo Palatino 244	Florence	Italy	CSNTM, INTF
ℓ 118	14th	Gospels^{e}	αω	368	Laurentian Library, Mediceo Palatino 243	Florence	Italy	CSNTM, INTF
ℓ 119	13th	Gospels^{e}	αω	268	Vatican Library, Vat. gr. 1155	Vatican City	Vatican	INTF
ℓ 120	11th/12th	Gospels^{esk}	αω	344	Vatican Library, Vat. gr. 1156	Vatican City	Vatican	DVL
ℓ 120	11th/12th	Gospels^{esk}	αω	344	Vatican Library, Vat. gr. 1156	Vatican City	Vatican	INTF
ℓ 121	11th	†Gospels^{e}	αω	419	Vatican Library, Vat. gr. 1157	Vatican City	Vatican	INTF
ℓ 122	1175	Gospels^{esk}	αω	194	Vatican Library, Vat. gr. 1068	Vatican City	Vatican	INTF
ℓ 123	10th	Gospels^{sel}	ΑΩ	197	Vatican Library, Vat. gr. 1522	Vatican City	Vatican	DVL
ℓ 124	12th	†Gospels^{esk}	αω	162	Vatican Library, Vat. gr. 1988	Vatican City	Vatican	INTF
ℓ 125	11th	Gospels^{esk}	αω	123	Vatican Library, Vat. gr. 2017	Vatican City	Vatican	INTF
ℓ 126	11th	Gospels^{e}	αω	337	Vatican Library, Vat. gr. 2041	Vatican City	Vatican	INTF
ℓ 127	9th	†Gospels^{esk}	ΑΩ	178	Vatican Library, Vat. gr. 2063	Vatican City	Vatican	DVL
ℓ 128	14th	Gospels^{esk}	αω	393	Vatican Library, Vat. gr. 2133	Vatican City	Vatican	INTF
ℓ 129	12th	†Gospels^{e}	αω	339	Vatican Library, Reg. gr. 12	Vatican City	Vatican	DVL, INTF
ℓ 130	10th	Gospels^{esk}	ΑΩ	343	Vatican Library, Ott. Gr. 2	Vatican City	Vatican	DVL,
ℓ 130	10th	Gospels^{esk}	ΑΩ	343	Vatican Library, Ott. Gr. 2	Vatican City	Vatican	INTF
ℓ 131	11th	Gospels^{sel}	αω	70	Vatican Library, Ott. gr. 175	Vatican City	Vatican	DVL
ℓ 132	14th	Gospels^{sel}	αω	53	Vatican Library, Ott. gr. 326	Vatican City	Vatican	DVL
ℓ 132	14th	Gospels^{sel}	αω	53	Vatican Library, Ott. gr. 326	Vatican City	Vatican	INTF
ℓ 133	14th	Gospels + Apostles^{e}	αω	296	Vatican Library, Ott. gr. 416	Vatican City	Vatican	INTF
ℓ 134	13th	†Gospels^{e}	αω	343	Vatican Library, Barb. gr. 565	Vatican City	Vatican	INTF
ℓ 135	8th	Gospels^{P}	ΑΩ P^{U}	145	Vatican Library, Barb. gr. 472 (fol. 1-118)	Vatican City	Vatican	DVL
ℓ 136	12th	Gospels^{esk}	αω P^{O}	165	Vatican Library, Barb. gr. 472	Vatican City	Vatican	DVL
ℓ 136	12th	Gospels^{esk}	αω P^{O}	165	Vatican Library, Barb. gr. 472	Vatican City	Vatican	INTF
ℓ 137	11th	Gospels^{esk}	αω	105	Vallicelliana Library, D. 63	Rome	Italy	INTF
ℓ 138	15th	Gospels^{esk}	αω	255	Vittorio Emanuele III National Library, Ms. II. A. 6	Naples	Italy	INTF
ℓ 139	10th/11th	†Gospels^{esk}	ΑΩ	219	Marciana National Library, Gr. Z. 12	Venice	Italy	INTF
ℓ 140	13th	Gospels			Owner Unknown, Formerly: Marciana National Library, Gr. Z. 286	Venice	Italy	
ℓ 141	11th	Gospels^{esk}	αω	270	Marciana National Library, Gr. I. 9	Venice	Italy	INTF
ℓ 142	14th	Gospels^{sel}	αω	45	Marciana National Library, Gr. I. 23	Venice	Italy	INTF
ℓ 143	8th	Gospels^{P}	ΑΩ	1	Berlin State Museums, P. 8771	Berlin	Germany	BerlPap
ℓ 143	8th	Gospels^{P}	ΑΩ	3	National Library, Copte 129,19, fol. 73; Copte 129,20 fol. 151; Copte 129,20 fol. 153	Paris	France	BnF,
ℓ 143	8th	Gospels^{P}	ΑΩ	2	Vatican Library, Borg. copt. 109 (Cass. 23, Fasc. 97)	Vatican City	Vatican	
ℓ 143	8th	Gospels^{P}	ΑΩ	1	British Library, Add Or 24	London	UK	
ℓ 144	14th	Apostles^{e}	αω	302	National Library, Grec 304	Paris	France	BnF
ℓ 145	12th	Apostles^{e}	αω	187	National Library, Grec 306	Paris	France	BnF
ℓ 146	12th	Gospels^{e}	αω	212	Cambridge University Library, Dd. 8.23	Cambridge	UK	INTF
ℓ 147	12th	Apostles^{e}	αω	274	National Library, Grec 319	Paris	France	BnF
ℓ 148	12th	Apostles^{e}	αω	208	National Library, Grec 320	Paris	France	BnF
ℓ 149	14th	†Apostles^{e}	αω	237	National Library, Grec 321	Paris	France	BnF
ℓ 150	995	Gospels^{e}	ΑΩ	374	British Library, Harley MS 5598	London	UK	BL
ℓ 151	12th	Gospels^{esk}	αω	359	British Library, Harley MS 5785	London	UK	BL
ℓ 152	9th	Gospels^{esk}	ΑΩ	224	British Library, MS Harl 5787	London	UK	BL
ℓ 153	14th	Gospels + Apostles^{esk}	αω	118	National Library, Grec 373	Paris	France	INTF
ℓ 154	13th	Gospels	αω	49	Bavarian State Library, Cod. graec. 326	München	Germany	INTF
ℓ 155	10th	Gospels^{esk}	ΑΩ P^{U}	143	Austrian National Library, Theol. gr. 209	Vienna	Austria	INTF
ℓ 156	10th	Apostles^{e}	αω	271	National Library, Grec 382	Paris	France	BnF
ℓ 157	1253	†Gospels^{esk}	αω	199	Bodleian Library, E. D. Clarke 8	Oxford	UK	INTF
ℓ 158	16th	Apostles^{e}	αω	206	National Library, Grec 383	Paris	France	BnF
ℓ 159	1061	Gospels^{esk}	αω	267	Orthodox Patriarchate, Panagias	Jerusalem	Israel	INTF
ℓ 160	15th	Apostles^{e}	αω	235	Vatican Library, Vat. gr. 1528	Vatican City	Vatican	INTF
ℓ 161	16th	Apostles^{esk}	αω	115	Vallicelliana Library, C. 46, fol. 227-341	Rome	Italy	INTF
ℓ 162	12th	Apostles^{e}	αω	239	Glasgow University Library, Ms. Hunter 406	Glasgow	UK	CSNTM
ℓ 163	14th	Apostles^{esk}	αω	153	Ambrosiana Library, C. 63 sup.	Milan	Italy	INTF
ℓ 164	1172	Apostles^{e}	αω	265	Christ Church, Wake 33	Oxford	UK	INTF
ℓ 165	11th	†Apostles^{e}	αω	130	Lambeth Palace, 1190	London	UK	INTF
ℓ 166	13th	†Apostles^{esk}	αω	155	Lambeth Palace, 1191	London	UK	INTF
ℓ 167	1531	Apostles^{sk}	αω	75	Lambeth Palace, 1195	London	UK	INTF
ℓ 168	11th-12th	Apostles^{e}	αω	219	Lambeth Palace, 1196	London	UK	INTF
ℓ 169	13th	Apostles^{e}	αω	192	British Library, Add MS 32051	London	UK	BL
ℓ 170	14th	†Apostles^{e}	αω	164	University of Michigan, Ms. 35	Ann Arbor	USA	CSNTM
ℓ 171	9th	Apostles	ΑΩ P^{U}	1	Russian National Library, Gr. 38, fol. 8	Saint Petersburg	Russia	
ℓ 172	13th	Apostles^{e}	αω	281	Harvard University, Ms. Gr. 7 (2)	Cambridge	USA	INTF
ℓ 173	10th	Gospels + Apostles^{esk}	αω	178	Russian National Library, Gr. 57	Saint Petersburg	Russia	INTF
ℓ 174	13th	Gospels + Apostles	αω P^{O}	32	Russian National Library, Gr. 37; Gr. 45a; Gr. 112	Saint Petersburg	Russia	INTF
ℓ 175	15th	Apostles^{e}	αω	113	New York Public Library, Rare Books and Manuscripts, Ms. 103	New York City	USA	INTF
ℓ 176	12th	†Apostles^{sel}	αω	96	Cambridge University Library, Add. Mss. 679.1	Cambridge	UK	INTF
ℓ 177	11th	†Apostles	αω	86	British Library, Add MS 11841	London	UK	BL
ℓ 178	9th	Hebrews 1:3-12; 11:24	ΑΩ	1	University of Leipzig, Cod. Gr. 69	Leipzig	Germany	INTF
ℓ 179	10th	Gospels + Apostles^{P}	ΑΩ	8	Trier Cathedral Treasury, Hs. 72, fol. 2-9	Trier	Germany	INTF
ℓ 180	14th	†Gospels^{esk}	αω	202	Harvard University, Theol. Libr., Ms. 21	Cambridge	USA	INTF
ℓ 181	980	Gospels^{esk}	ΑΩ	222	British Library, Add MS 39602	London	UK	BL
ℓ 182	9th	Gospels^{P}	ΑΩ	3	British Library, Add MS 39583	London	UK	BL
ℓ 183	10th	†Gospels^{esk}	ΑΩ	329	British Library, Arundel MS 547	London	UK	BL
ℓ 184	1319	Gospels^{e}	αω	248	British Library, Burney MS 22	London	UK	BL
ℓ 185	11th	†Gospels^{e}	αω	218	Christ's College, GG.1.6 (Ms. 6)	Cambridge	UK	CSNTM
ℓ 186	11th	Gospels^{esk}	αω	248	Trinity College (O. IV. 22)	Cambridge	UK	INTF
ℓ 187	13th	†Gospels^{esk}	αω	217	British Library, Arundel MS 536	London	UK	BL
ℓ 188	1033	†Gospels^{esk}	αω	274	British Library, Add MS 5153	London	UK	BL,
ℓ 189	12th	†Gospels^{esk}	αω	236	British Library, Add MS 11840	London	UK	BL
ℓ 190	11th	†Gospels^{P}	αω	1	British Library, Add MS 17370	London	UK	BL
ℓ 191	12th	†Gospels^{e}	αω	297	British Library, Add MS 18212	London	UK	BL
ℓ 192	13th	†Gospels^{esk}	αω	104	British Library, Add MS 19460	London	UK	BL
ℓ 193	1334/1335	Gospels^{esk}	αω	281	British Library, Add MS 19993	London	UK	BL
ℓ 194	10th	†Gospels^{esk}	ΑΩ	259	Bodleian Library, Canon. Gr. 85	Oxford	UK	INTF
ℓ 195	11th	Gospels^{esk}	ΑΩ	483	Bodleian Library, Canon. Gr. 92	Oxford	UK	INTF
ℓ 196	15th	Gospels^{esk}	αω	155	Bodleian Library, Canon. Gr. 119	Oxford	UK	INTF
ℓ 197	15th	Matthew 25:1-13; Mark 5:24-34; Luke 1:1-25, 57-68, 76, 80; Galatians 4:6-7; 1 John 4:12-19	αω	8	Bodleian Library, Canon. Gr. 126, fol. 252-259	Oxford	UK	INTF
ℓ 198	12th	Gospels	αω	276	Bodleian Library, E. D. Clarke. 45	Oxford	UK	INTF
ℓ 199	13th	†Gospels^{esk}	αω	243	Bodleian Library, E. D. Clarke. 46	Oxford	UK	INTF
ℓ 200	12th	Gospels^{e}	αω	292	Bodleian Library, E. D. Clarke. 47	Oxford	UK	INTF

[top]

=== Lectionaries 201–300 ===
#	Date	Contents	Script	Pages	Institution	City, State	Country	Images
ℓ 201	13th	Gospels^{esk}	αω	187	Bodleian Library, E. D. Clarke. 48	Oxford	UK	INTF
ℓ 202	12th	Gospels^{e}	αω	323	Bodleian Library, Cromw. 27	Oxford	UK	INTF
ℓ 203	1067	Gospels^{e}	αω	300	Bodleian Library, Auct. F. 6. 25	Oxford	UK	INTF
ℓ 204	11th	Gospels^{sel}	αω	305	Bodleian Library, Rawl. G. 2	Oxford	UK	INTF
ℓ 205	10th	Gospels^{P}	ΑΩ P^{U}	5	Bodleian Library, Barocci 197	Oxford	UK	INTF
ℓ 206	11th	Gospels^{sel}	αω	255	Bodleian Library, Wake 13	Oxford	UK	INTF
ℓ 207	12th	Gospels^{esk}	αω	246	Bodleian Library, Wake 14	Oxford	UK	INTF
ℓ 208	11th	†Gospels^{esk}	αω	217	Bodleian Library, Wake 15	Oxford	UK	INTF
ℓ 209	12th	†Gospels^{esk}	αω	217	Bodleian Library, Wake 16	Oxford	UK	INTF
ℓ 210	12th	†Gospels^{esk}	αω	227	Bodleian Library, Wake 17	Oxford	UK	INTF
ℓ 211	12th	Gospels^{e}	αω P^{O}	209	Bodleian Library, Wake 18	Oxford	UK	INTF
ℓ 212	11th	†Gospels^{esk}	αω	248	Bodleian Library, Wake 19	Oxford	UK	INTF
ℓ 213	13th	Gospels^{e}	αω	256	Bodleian Library, Wake 23	Oxford	UK	INTF
ℓ 214	12th	Gospels^{e}	αω	144	National Library, 4079	Athens	Greece	
ℓ 215	13th/14th	Gospels^{esk}	αω	137	Owner Unknown			
ℓ 216	13th	Gospels + Apostles^{Lit}	αω	60	University of Michigan, Ms. 49	Ann Arbor	USA	CSNTM
ℓ 217	13th	Gospels^{esk}	αω	154	National Library, 4080	Athens	Greece	CSNTM
ℓ 218	15th	†Gospels^{esk}	αω	288	National Library, EBE 4095	Athens	Greece	
ℓ 219	11th	†Gospels^{e}	αω	319	National Library, EBE 4078	Athens	Greece	
ℓ 220	13th	Gospels^{esk}	αω P^{O}	161	Univ. Libr., Ms. 83	Ann Arbor	USA	CSNTM
ℓ 221	15th	Gospels^{e}	αω	156	Scriptorium, VK 1096	Orlando	USA	CSNTM
ℓ 222	13th	Gospels	αω	241	New York Public Library, Spencer Collection Greek 2	New York	New York	
ℓ 223	15th	Gospels + Apostles^{Lit}	αω	174	University of Michigan, Ms. 17	Ann Arbor	USA	CSNTM
ℓ 224	14th	Gospels^{esk}	αω	206	University of Michigan, Ms. 31	Ann Arbor	USA	CSNTM
ℓ 225	1437	Gospels^{esk}	αω	309	University of Michigan, Ms. 29	Ann Arbor	USA	CSNTM
ℓ 226	14th	†Gospels^{e}	αω	220	University of Michigan, Ms. 28	Ann Arbor	USA	CSNTM
ℓ 227	14th	†Gospels^{esk}	αω	85	University of Michigan, Ms. 32	Ann Arbor	USA	CSNTM
ℓ 228	15th	†Gospels + Apostles^{Lit}	αω	177	University of Michigan, Ms. 43	Ann Arbor	USA	CSNTM
ℓ 229	11th-12th	Gospels^{esk}	αω	177	Lambeth Palace, 1187	London	UK	INTF
ℓ 230	11th-12th	Gospels^{e}	αω	318	Lambeth Palace, 1188	London	UK	INTF
ℓ 231	14th	†Gospels^{esk}	αω	151	Lambeth Palace, 1189	London	UK	INTF
ℓ 232	11th-12th	†Gospels^{esk}	αω	153	Lambeth Palace, 1193	London	UK	INTF
ℓ 233	11th	†Gospels^{e}	αω	188	British Library, Add MS 39603	London	UK	BL
ℓ 234	11th-12th	†Gospels^{esk}	αω	246	Sion College, Arc L 40.2/G 1	London	UK	INTF
ℓ 235	11th-12th	†Gospels^{esk}	αω	143	Sion College, Arc L 40.2/G 2	London	UK	INTF
ℓ 236	11th-12th	†Gospels^{esk}	αω	217	Sion College, Arc L 40.2/G 4	London	UK	INTF
ℓ 237	12th	†Gospels^{esk}	αω	132	British Library, Add MS 36822	London	UK	BL
ℓ 238	11th	†Gospels^{e}	αω	144	British Library, Egerton MS 3046	London	UK	BL
ℓ 239	1259	†Gospels^{esk}	αω	112	Glasgow University Library, Ms. Hunter 440	Glasgow	UK	CSNTM
ℓ 240	12th	Gospels^{esk}	αω	251	Glasgow University Library, Ms. Hunter 405	Glasgow	UK	CSNTM
ℓ 241	1199	†Gospels + Apostles^{e}	αω	176	Glasgow University Library, Ms. Hunter 419	Glasgow	UK	CSNTM
[ℓ 242] = ℓ 1386								
ℓ 243	10th	Matthew 3:13-14, 6:18-21, 18:15-19, 26:14-19, 27:58-66, 28:2-7; Mark 1:9-11; Luke 9:31-33; John 2:3-9, 3:26-32, 9:2-6, 10:38, 13:5-10, 21:21-25	ΑΩ	15	Russian National Library, Gr. 21, 21a	Saint Petersburg	Russia	INTF
ℓ 244	9th	Gospels^{P}	ΑΩ	1	Russian National Library, Gr. 35	Saint Petersburg	Russia	
ℓ 245	9th	Gospels^{P}	ΑΩ	1	Russian National Library, Gr. 36	Saint Petersburg	Russia	
ℓ 246	9th	Gospels^{P}	ΑΩ	2	Russian National Library, Gr. 39	Saint Petersburg	Russia	
ℓ 247	9th	Matthew 8:8-13	ΑΩ	1	Russian National Library, Gr. 40	Saint Petersburg	Russia	INTF
ℓ 248	9th	Matthew 6:1-21, 25:31-46; Luke 15:11-32, 18:14, 21:8-9, 25-27, 33-36	ΑΩ	6	Russian National Library, Gr. 43	Saint Petersburg	Russia	INTF
ℓ 249	9th	†Gospels + Apostles^{Sel}	ΑΩ	69	Russian National Library, Gr. 44	Saint Petersburg	Russia	INTF
ℓ 250	10th	Gospels + Apostles^{esk}	ΑΩ	198	Russian National Library, Gr. 55	Saint Petersburg	Russia	INTF
ℓ 251	10th	Gospels^{e}	αω	251	Russian National Library, Gr. 56	Saint Petersburg	Russia	
ℓ 252	11th	Gospels^{e}	αω	498	Russian National Library, Gr. 69	Saint Petersburg	Russia	INTF
ℓ 253	1020	Gospels^{sk}	αω	169	Russian National Library, Gr. 71	Saint Petersburg	Russia	INTF
ℓ 254	11th	Matt 24:39, 42-44	αω	1	Russian National Library, Gr. 80	Saint Petersburg	Russia	INTF
ℓ 255	11th	Gospels^{P}	αω	41	Russian National Library, Gr. 84	Saint Petersburg	Russia	INTF
ℓ 256	12th	Gospels + Apostles^{P}	αω	93	Russian National Library, Gr. 90	Saint Petersburg	Russia	INTF
ℓ 257	1306	†Gospels + Apostles	αω	178	British Library, Add MS 29714	London	UK	BL
ℓ 258	13th	Gospels^{P}	αω	4	Russian National Library, Gr. 111	Saint Petersburg	Russia	
ℓ 259	13th	Romans 5:18-21, 8:3-14; 9:29-33; 2 Corinthians 5:15-21; Galatians 3:28-29, 5:1-5; Colossians 1:18-22; Philippians 3:3-9; 2 Timothy 3:2-9	αω	14	Bodleian Library, Auct. T. inf. 2.11	Oxford	UK	INTF
ℓ 260		Gospels			Owner Unknown			
ℓ 261	12th	Gospels^{esk}	αω	207	National Library, Supplement Grec 27	Paris	France	BnF
ℓ 262	17th	Gospels^{e}	αω	265	National Library, Supplement Grec 242	Paris	France	BnF
ℓ 263	12th	Gospels^{esk}	αω	210	Besançon Municipal Library, Ms. 45	Besançon	France	INTF
ℓ 264	1381	Gospels^{esk}	αω	209	Marciana National Library, Gr. I. 4 (1396)	Venice	Italy	INTF
ℓ 265	10th	Gospels^{P}	ΑΩ	78	Marciana National Library, Gr. I. 45 (927)	Venice	Italy	INTF
ℓ 266	12th	Gospels^{esk}	αω	50	Marciana National Library, Gr. I. 46 (1435)	Venice	Italy	INTF
ℓ 267	1046	Gospels^{e}	αω	300	Marciana National Library, Gr. I. 47 (978)	Venice	Italy	INTF
ℓ 268	12th	Gospels^{esk}	αω	281	Marciana National Library, Gr. I. 48 (1199)	Venice	Italy	INTF
ℓ 269	8th	Gospels^{P}	ΑΩ P^{U}	4	Marciana National Library, Gr. I,49 (1213), fol. 251-254	Venice	Italy	INTF
ℓ 270	14th	Gospels^{esk}	αω	403	Marciana National Library, Gr. I. 50 (1436)	Venice	Italy	INTF
ℓ 271	17th	Gospels^{P}	αω	11	Marciana National Library, Gr. I. 51 (1419)	Venice	Italy	INTF
ℓ 272	16th	Gospels^{e}	αω	276	Marciana National Library, Gr. I. 52 (1200)	Venice	Italy	INTF
ℓ 273	13th	Gospels^{P}	αω	9	Marciana National Library, Gr. II. 17 (1295)	Venice	Italy	INTF
ℓ 274	1580	Gospels + Apostles^{esk}	αω	501	Marciana National Library, Gr. II. 143 (1381)	Venice	Italy	
ℓ 275	12th	Gospels^{e}	αω	303	Marciana National Library, Gr. I. 53 (966)	Venice	Italy	INTF
ℓ 276	13th	Gospels^{e}	αω	168	Marciana National Library, Gr. I. 54 (1146)	Venice	Italy	INTF
ℓ 277	1438	Gospels^{e}	αω	387	Marciana National Library, Gr. I. 55 (967)	Venice	Italy	INTF
ℓ 278	11th	Gospels^{esk}	αω	221	Hellenic Institute of Byzantine and Post-Byzantine Studies, B'	Venice	Italy	INTF
ℓ 279	11th	Gospels^{e}	αω	415	Hellenic Institute of Byzantine and Post-Byzantine Studies, A'	Venice	Italy	INTF
ℓ 280	14th	Gospels^{e}	αω	240	Hellenic Institute of Byzantine and Post-Byzantine Studies, G'	Venice	Italy	INTF
ℓ 281	14th	Gospels^{e}	αω	236	University of Bologna, 3638	Bologna	Italy	INTF
ℓ 282	14th	Gospels^{e}	αω	160	Palatina Library, Ms. Pal. 14	Parma	Italy	INTF
ℓ 283	11th	Gospels^{e}	αω	313	Biblioteca Comunale degli Intronati, X. IV. 1	Siena	Italy	INTF
ℓ 284	10th	Matthew 26:18-20; John 13:3-12	αω	1	Ambrosiana Library, Q. 79 sup., fol. 1	Milan	Italy	INTF
ℓ 285	12th	Gospels^{P}	αω	37	Ambrosiana Library, I. 94 suss., fol. 1-37	Milan	Italy	INTF
ℓ 286	9th	Gospels^{P}	ΑΩ P^{U}	5	Ambrosiana Library, E. 101 sup.	Milan	Italy	INTF
ℓ 287	13th	Gospels^{e}	αω	201	Ambrosiana Library, D. 108 sup., fol. 3-203 (fol. 1- 2, 204: ℓ 2352)	Milan	Italy	INTF
ℓ 288	13th	†Gospels^{esk}	αω	124	Ambrosiana Library, A. 150 sup.	Milan	Italy	INTF
ℓ 289	14th	†Gospels^{e}	αω	156	Ambrosiana Library, C. 160 inf.	Milan	Italy	INTF
ℓ 290	14th	†Gospels + Apostles^{esk}	αω	198	Ambrosiana Library, P. 274 sup.	Milan	Italy	INTF
ℓ 291	13th	Gospels^{esk}	αω	181	Laurentian Library, S. Marco 706	Florence	Italy	CSNTM
ℓ 292	9th	Gospels^{e}	ΑΩ	277	Municipal Library, 10 (L 11)	Carpentras	France	INTF
ℓ 293	8th	†Gospels^{e}	ΑΩ P^{U}	89	University of Leipzig, Cod. Gr. 3	Leipzig	Germany	INTF
ℓ 294	9th/10th	John 1:38-48	αω	1	University of Tübingen, Mb. 4	Tübingen	Germany	INTF
ℓ 295	10th	Gospels^{P}	αω	1	Owner unknown			
ℓ 296	10th	Gospels^{P}	ΑΩ	6	Houghton Library, Harvard University, Ms. Gr. 6	Cambridge	USA	INTF
ℓ 297	13th	†Gospels^{esk}	αω	230	Houghton Library, Harvard University, Ms. Gr. 7 (1)	Cambridge	USA	INTF
ℓ 298	14th	Gospels^{e}	αω	202	Houghton Library, Harvard University, Ms. Gr. 12	Cambridge	USA	INTF
ℓ 299	13th	†Gospels^{e}	αω P^{O}	176	Cambridge University Library, MS Additional 10062	Cambridge	UK	INTF
ℓ 300	11th	Gospels^{sel}	ΑΩ	204	Saint Catherine's Monastery, Ms. Gr. 12	Sinai	Egypt	CSNTM

[top]

=== Lectionaries 301–400 ===
#	Date	Contents	Script	Pages	Institution	City, State	Country	Images
ℓ 301	13th	†Gospels^{esk}	αω	334	Drew University, 2	Madison	USA	CSNTM
ℓ 302	15th (paper)	†Gospels^{e}	αω	199	Duke University, Gk Ms 83	Durham	USA	DU, INTF
ℓ 303	12th	Gospels^{e}	αω	340	Princeton Theological Seminary, 11.21.1900	Princeton	USA	INTF
ℓ 304+[ℓ 1677]	14th	†Gospels^{e}	αω	219	Lutheran School of Theology at Chicago, Gruber MS 111	Chicago	USA	CSNTM
ℓ 305	12th	Gospels^{sel}	αω	171	Cambridge University Library, Add. Mss. 679.2	Cambridge	UK	INTF
ℓ 306	13th	†Gospels^{k}	αω	136	Cambridge University Library, Add. Mss. 1836	Cambridge	UK	INTF
ℓ 307	12th	†Gospels^{esk}	αω	104	Cambridge University Library, Add. Mss. 1839	Cambridge	UK	INTF
ℓ 308	11th	†Gospels^{e}	αω	112	Cambridge University Library, Add. Mss. 1840	Cambridge	UK	INTF
ℓ 309	10th	Gospels^{P}	αω	8	Cambridge University Library, Add. Mss. 1879.2	Cambridge	UK	INTF
ℓ 310	11th	Gospels^{P}	αω	4	Cambridge University Library, Add. Mss. 1879.12	Cambridge	UK	INTF
ℓ 311	12th	Gospels^{P}	αω	4	Cambridge University Library, Add. Mss. 1879.13	Cambridge	UK	INTF
ℓ 312	9th	†Gospels^{P}	ΑΩ	2	Saint Catherine's Monastery	Sinai	Egypt	
ℓ 313	14th	†Gospels^{e}	αω	209	University of Michigan, Ms. 33	Ann Arbor	USA	CSNTM
ℓ 314	12th	Gospels^{P}	αω	2	Brown University, Koopmann MS Greek 3	Providence	USA	
ℓ 315	16th	Gospels + Apostles^{Lit}	αω	316	Owner unknown			
ℓ 316	8th	Gospels^{P}	ΑΩ P^{U}	23	British Library, Add MS 14637	London	UK	
ℓ 317	9th	Gospels^{P}	ΑΩ P^{U}	18	British Library, Add MS 14638	London	UK	INTF
ℓ 318	12th	†Gospels^{e}	αω	279	British Library, Add MS 19737	London	UK	BL
ℓ 319	12th	Gospels^{e}	αω	360	British Library, Add MS 21260	London	UK	BL
ℓ 320	14th	†Gospels^{esk}	αω	196	British Library, Add MS 21261	London	UK	BL
ℓ 321	12th	Gospels^{e}	αω	304	British Library, Add MS 22735	London	UK	BL
ℓ 322	11th	Gospels^{P}	αω	79	British Library, Add MS 22742	London	UK	BL
ℓ 323	13th	Gospels^{e}	αω	213	British Library, Add MS 22743	London	UK	BL
ℓ 324	13th	†Gospels^{e}	αω	189	British Library, Add MS 22744	London	UK	BL
ℓ 325	13th	†Gospels^{P}	αω	90	British Library, Add MS 24374	London	UK	BL
ℓ 326	13th	†Gospels^{esk}	αω	182	British Library, Add MS 24377	London	UK	BL
ℓ 327	14th	†Gospels^{e}	αω	178	British Library, Add MS 24379	London	UK	BL
ℓ 328	14th	†Gospels^{esk}	αω	126	British Library, Add MS 24380	London	UK	BL
ℓ 329	11th	†Gospels^{esk}	αω	115	British Library, Add MS 27860	London	UK	BL
ℓ 330	1185	†Gospels^{esk}	αω	306	British Library, Add MS 28817	London	UK	BL
ℓ 331	13th	†Gospels^{esk}	αω	118	British Library, Add MS 28818	London	UK	BL
ℓ 332	14th	†Gospels^{e}	αω	295	British Library, Add MS 29713	London	UK	BL
ℓ 333	13th	†Gospels^{e}	αω	272	British Library, Add MS 31208	London	UK	BL
ℓ 334	11th	Gospels^{P}	αω P^{U}	65	British Library, Add MS 31919	London	UK	BL
ℓ 335	11th	Gospels^{esk}	αω	226	British Library, Add MS 31920	London	UK	BL
ℓ 336	14th	†Gospels^{e}	αω	178	British Library, Add MS 31921	London	UK	BL
ℓ 337	12th	†Gospels^{esk}	αω	103	British Library, Add MS 31949	London	UK	BL
ℓ 338	10th	Gospels^{esk}	ΑΩ P^{U}	157	British Library, Burney MS 408	London	UK	BL
ℓ 339	13th	Gospels^{e}	αω	207	British Library, Egerton MS 2163	London	UK	BL
ℓ 340	13th	Gospels + Apostles^{Lit}	αω	276	British Library, Harley MS 5561	London	UK	BL
ℓ 341	11th	Gospels^{e}	αω	355	Bodleian Library, Auct. T. inf. 2. 7	Oxford	UK	INTF
ℓ 342	12th	Gospels^{e}	αω	216	Bodleian Library, Auct. T. inf. 2. 8	Oxford	UK	INTF
ℓ 343	13th	†Gospels^{esk}	αω	151	Keble College, 7	Oxford	UK	
ℓ 344	12th	†Gospels^{e}	αω	301	British Library, Add MS 39604	London	UK	BL
ℓ 345	12th	†Gospels^{esk}	αω	157	Duke University Libraries, Greek MS 093	Durham, NC	USA	DU
ℓ 346	14th	†Gospels^{esk}	αω	156	British Library, Egerton MS 2786	London	UK	BL
ℓ 347	14th	Gospels^{P}	αω P^{O}	6	Austrian National Library, Theol. gr. 160, fol. 1-4.214. 215	Vienna	Austria	
ℓ 348	14th	Apostles^{Lit}	αω	173	Russian National Library, Gr. 226	Saint Petersburg	Russia	
[ℓ 349] = 0237								
ℓ 350	15th	Gospels^{P}	αω	44	Interuniversity Library, H. 405, fol. 1-44	Montpellier	France	
ℓ 351	12th	Gospels^{e}	αω	313	Metropolitan Museum of Art, Acc. no. 2007.286	New York, NY	USA	Met
ℓ 352	8th	John 2:18-22, 3:22-29, 5:46-47, 6:1-2, 6:14-22	ΑΩ	2	National Library, Supplément Grec 1155, IV, fol. 5-6	Paris	France	BnF, INTF
ℓ 353	9th	John 16:24-33, 17:1-4, 18:2-26, 30-40	ΑΩ	4	National Library, Supplément Grec 1155, V, fol. 7-10	Paris	France	BnF, INTF
ℓ 354	8th	Matthew 14:22-34, 15:32-39, 17:14-15, 24-27, 18:1-11, 18:18-22, 19:1-2, 19:13-15, 20:1-28, 21:12-32, 43-46, 22:23-33	ΑΩ	8	National Library, Supplément Grec 1155, VI, fol. 11, 18	Paris	France	BnF, INTF
[ℓ 355] =0303								
ℓ 356	10th	Matthew 7:12-14, 13:45-50, 24:42-47; Mark 7:24-27; Luke 6:21-23	ΑΩ	2	National Library, Supplément Grec 1155, VIII, fol. 20, 21	Paris	France	BnF, INTF
ℓ 357	10th	Matthew 3:11, 14^{K}, 11:12-15, 27-30, 20:1-4; Mark 1:14-15; Luke 2:23-36, 3:19-20	ΑΩ	2	National Library, Supplément Grec 1155, IX, fol. 22, 23; Supplement Grec 686, fol. 34-36	Paris	France	BnF, INTF
ℓ 358	10th	Gospels^{P}	ΑΩ	6	National Library, Supplement Grec 1155, X, fol. 24-29	Paris	France	BnF, INTF
ℓ 358	10th	Gospels^{P}	ΑΩ	2	Vatopedi monastery, 1219, fol. 59, 60	Athos	Greece	
ℓ 359	10th	Mark 1:41-44, 3:4-5, 8:27-28, 9:24-31	ΑΩ	2	National Library, Supplement Grec 1155, XI, fol. 30.31	Paris	France	BnF, INTF
ℓ 360	8th	Matthew 17:1-4; Luke 9:28-36; John 10:23-30	ΑΩ	2	National Library, Supplement Grec 1155, XII, fol. 32.33	Paris	France	BnF, INTF
ℓ 361	12th	†Gospels^{e}	αω	236	National Library, Grec 256	Paris	France	INTF
ℓ 362	9th	†Gospels^{esk}	ΑΩ P^{U}	240	National Library, Grec 928	Paris	France	BnF
ℓ 363	10th	Gospels^{P}	ΑΩ P^{U}	55	National Library, Grec 975 B, fol. 1-114	Paris	France	BnF
ℓ 364	12th	Gospels^{e}	αω	339	National Library, Supplement Grec 24	Paris	France	INTF
ℓ 365	12th	†Gospels^{esk}	αω	198	National Library, Supplement Grec 29	Paris	France	BnF
ℓ 366	12th	Gospels^{P}	αω	72	National Library, Supplement Grec 74	Paris	France	BnF
ℓ 367	11th	Gospels^{sk}	ΑΩ	173	National Library, Supplement Grec 567	Paris	France	
[ℓ 368] = 0306								
ℓ 369	12th	†Gospels^{esk}	αω	111	National Library, Supplement Grec 758	Paris	France	BnF
ℓ 370	9th	Gospels^{P}	ΑΩ P^{U}	7	National Library, Supplement Grec 1092, fol. 12-18	Paris	France	BnF
ℓ 371	13th	†Gospels^{e}	αω	90	National Library, Supplement Grec 834	Paris	France	BnF
ℓ 372	1055	†Gospels^{esk}	αω	255	National Library, Supplement Grec 905	Paris	France	BnF
ℓ 373	10th	Gospels^{esk}	ΑΩ	253	National Library, Supplement Grec 1081	Paris	France	BnF
ℓ 374	11th	Gospels^{e}	αω	329	National Library, Supplement Grec 1096	Paris	France	BnF
ℓ 375	12th	†Gospels^{e}	αω	272	Jagiellonian Library, Graec. fol. 51	Kraków	Poland	INTF
ℓ 376	12th	Gospels^{e}	αω	223	Jagiellonian Library, Graec. fol. 52	Kraków	Poland	
ℓ 377	11th/12th	Gospels^{esk}	αω	248	Jagiellonian Library, Graec. fol. 53?	Kraków	Poland	
ℓ 378	12th	Gospels^{P}	αω	46	Jagiellonian Library, Graec. qu. 44	Kraków	Poland	
ℓ 379	12th	†Gospels?	αω	177	Berlin State Library, Gr. qu. 61	Berlin	Germany	INTF
ℓ 380	12th	†Gospels^{esk}	αω	135	Jagiellonian Library, Graec. qu. 64	Kraków	Poland	
ℓ 381	11th	Gospels^{e}	αω	378	Morgan Library & Museum, MS M.639	New York, NY	USA	INTF
ℓ 382	13th	Gospels^{e}	αω	394	Berlin State Library, Ham. 246	Berlin	Germany	
ℓ 383	12th	†Gospels^{esk}	αω	327	National Library, 163	Athens	Greece	CSNTM
ℓ 384	12th	Gospels^{e}	αω	292	National Library, 164	Athens	Greece	CSNTM
ℓ 385	12th	†Gospels^{esk}	αω	162	National Library, 165	Athens	Greece	CSNTM
ℓ 386	12th	†Gospels^{e}	αω	286	National Library, 166	Athens	Greece	CSNTM
ℓ 387	11th	†Gospels^{e}	αω	243	National Library, 167	Athens	Greece	CSNTM
ℓ 388	1527	†Gospels^{esk}	αω	217	National Library, 168	Athens	Greece	CSNTM
ℓ 389	11th	†Gospels^{esk}	αω	211	National Library, 169	Athens	Greece	CSNTM
ℓ 390	10th/11th	†Gospels^{esk}	αω	144	National Library, 170	Athens	Greece	CSNTM
ℓ 391	16th	†Gospels^{e}	αω	358	National Library, 171	Athens	Greece	CSNTM
ℓ 392	12th	†Gospels^{esk}	αω	212	National Library, 172	Athens	Greece	CSNTM
ℓ 393	12th	†Gospels^{esk}	αω	248	National Library, 173	Athens	Greece	CSNTM
ℓ 394	12th	†Gospels^{esk}	αω	256	National Library, 174	Athens	Greece	CSNTM
ℓ 395	14th	†Gospels^{esk}	αω	172	National Library, 175	Athens	Greece	CSNTM
ℓ 396	14th	†Gospels^{e}	αω	223	National Library, 176	Athens	Greece	CSNTM
ℓ 397	10th	Gospels^{P}	ΑΩ^{U}	79	National Library, 177	Athens	Greece	CSNTM
ℓ 398	14th	Gospels^{sel}	αω^{O}	78	National Library, 177	Athens	Greece	CSNTM
ℓ 399	13th	Gospels^{P}	αω	53	National Library, 178, ff. 1–6, 132–178	Athens	Greece	CSNTM
ℓ 400	14th	Gospels^{esk}	αω	125	National Library, 178, ff. 7–131	Athens	Greece	CSNTM

[top]

=== Lectionaries 401–500 ===
#	Date	Contents	Script	Pages	Institution	City, State	Country	Images
ℓ 401	1048	†Gospels^{esk}	αω	266	National Library, 179	Athens	Greece	CSNTM
ℓ 401	1048	†Gospels^{esk}	αω	266	National Library, 179	Athens	Greece	CSNTM
ℓ 402	1089	†Gospels^{e}	αω	204	National Library, 180	Athens	Greece	CSNTM
ℓ 402	1089	†Gospels^{e}	αω	204	National Library, 180	Athens	Greece	CSNTM
ℓ 403	14th	†Gospels^{esk}	αω	257	National Library, 181	Athens	Greece	INTF
ℓ 404	12th	†Gospels^{(e)sk}	αω	156	National Library, 182	Athens	Greece	CSNTM
ℓ 405	1274	†Gospels^{e}	αω	151	National Library, 183	Athens	Greece	CSNTM
ℓ 405	1274	†Gospels^{e}	αω	151	National Library, 183	Athens	Greece	CSNTM
ℓ 406	14th	†Gospels^{e}	αω	242	National Library, 184	Athens	Greece	CSNTM
ℓ 407	13th	†Gospels^{esk}	αω	261	National Library, 185	Athens	Greece	CSNTM
ℓ 407	13th	†Gospels^{esk}	αω	3	University of Birmingham Cadbury Research Library, Mingana Gr. 2	Birmingham	United Kingdom	UB
ℓ 408	12th	†Gospels^{e}	αω	171	National Library, 186	Athens	Greece	CSNTM
ℓ 409	11th	†Gospels^{esk}	αω	271	National Library, 187	Athens	Greece	CSNTM
ℓ 409	11th	†Gospels^{esk}	αω	271	National Library, 187	Athens	Greece	CSNTM
ℓ 410	13th	Gospels^{esk}	αω	301	National Library, 188	Athens	Greece	CSNTM
ℓ 411	12th	†Gospels^{e}	αω	156	National Library, 189	Athens	Greece	CSNTM
ℓ 412	12th	†Gospels^{esk}	αω	250	National Library, 190	Athens	Greece	CSNTM
ℓ 413	14th	Gospels^{e}	αω	159	National Library, 191	Athens	Greece	CSNTM
ℓ 414	14th	Gospels^{esk}	αω^{O}	240	National Library, 192	Athens	Greece	CSNTM
ℓ 415	14th	†Gospels^{esk}	αω	216	National Library, 193, ff. 1–214	Athens	Greece	CSNTM
ℓ 416	1452	Gospels^{e}	αω	394	National Library, 194	Athens	Greece	CSNTM
ℓ 417	1536	Gospels^{esk}	αω	381	National Library, 195	Athens	Greece	CSNTM
ℓ 418	15th	Gospels^{esk}	αω	206	National Library, 196	Athens	Greece	CSNTM
ℓ 419	16th	Gospels^{esk}	αω	341	National Library, 197	Athens	Greece	CSNTM
ℓ 420	15th	†Gospels^{esk}	αω	322	National Library, 198	Athens	Greece	CSNTM
ℓ 421	12th	Gospels + Apostles^{esk}	αω	293	National Library, 199	Athens	Greece	CSNTM
ℓ 422	14th	Gospels + Apostles^{e}	αω	339	National Library, 200	Athens	Greece	CSNTM
ℓ 423	1732	Gospels + Apostles^{P}	αω	32	National Library, 201	Athens	Greece	CSNTM
ℓ 424	12th	Gospels^{P}	αω	2	National Library, 202, p. 1-4	Athens	Greece	
ℓ 425	9th-10th	†Gospels^{esk}	ΑΩ	273	National Library, 59	Athens	Greece	CSNTM
ℓ 426	15th	Gospels + Apostles^{P}	αω	100	National Library, 685, pp. 194–392	Athens	Greece	CSNTM
ℓ 426	15th	Gospels + Apostles^{P}	αω	100	National Library, 685, pp. 194–392	Athens	Greece	CSNTM
ℓ 427	13th	†Gospels + Apostles^{e}	αω	348	National Library, 133	Athens	Greece	CSNTM
ℓ 428	12th	†Gospels^{esk}	αω	296	National Library, 63	Athens	Greece	CSNTM
ℓ 429	12th	†Gospels^{esk}	αω	197	National Library, 66	Athens	Greece	CSNTM
ℓ 430	12th	Gospels^{e}	αω	199	National Library, 70	Athens	Greece	CSNTM
ℓ 431	15th	Gospels^{e}	αω	324	National Library, 83	Athens	Greece	CSNTM
ℓ 432	12th	†Gospels^{esk}	αω	287	National Library, 64	Athens	Greece	CSNTM
ℓ 433	12th	†Gospels^{esk}	αω	139	National Library, 82	Athens	Greece	CSNTM
ℓ 434	12th	†Gospels^{esk}	αω	220	National Library, 68	Athens	Greece	CSNTM
ℓ 435	14th	Gospels^{esk}	αω	192	National Library, 79	Athens	Greece	CSNTM
ℓ 435	14th	Gospels^{esk}	αω	192	National Library, 79	Athens	Greece	CSNTM
ℓ 436	1545	†Gospels^{e}	αω	314	National Library, 73	Athens	Greece	CSNTM
ℓ 437	12th	†Gospels^{e}	αω	260	National Library, 67	Athens	Greece	CSNTM
ℓ 438	13th	†Gospels^{sk}	αω	119	National Library, 112	Athens	Greece	CSNTM
ℓ 439	14th	Gospels + Apostles^{Lit}	αω	138	National Library, 661	Athens	Greece	CSNTM
ℓ 440	1504	Gospels + Apostles^{esk}	αω	276	National Library, 126	Athens	Greece	CSNTM
ℓ 441	11th	Gospels^{esk}	αω	200	National Library, 69	Athens	Greece	CSNTM
ℓ 442	12th	†Gospels^{esk}	αω	314	National Library, 61	Athens	Greece	CSNTM
ℓ 443	12th	Gospels + Apostles^{Lit}	αω	252	National Library, 840	Athens	Greece	CSNTM
ℓ 443	12th	Gospels + Apostles^{Lit}	αω	252	National Library, 840	Athens	Greece	CSNTM
ℓ 444	10th	Gospels^{P}	ΑΩ^{U}	133	National Library, 347	Athens	Greece	CSNTM
ℓ 445	14th	†Gospels^{esk}	αω	146	National Library, 84	Athens	Greece	CSNTM
ℓ 446	14th	†Gospels + Apostles^{Lit}	αω	178	National Library, 713	Athens	Greece	CSNTM
ℓ 447	12th	†Gospels^{e}	αω	102	National Library, 85	Athens	Greece	CSNTM
ℓ 448	13th	†Gospels^{esk}	αω	169	National Library, 124	Athens	Greece	CSNTM
ℓ 449	12th	Gospels^{esk}	αω	329	National Library, 62	Athens	Greece	CSNTM
ℓ 450	12th	Gospels^{esk}	αω	478	Hellenic Parliament Library, 7	Athens	Greece	CSNTM
ℓ 451	1052	Gospels^{esk}	αω	242	Duke University, Greek MS 085	Durham, NC	USA	DU
ℓ 452	12th	Gospels^{P}	αω	30?	Owner Unknown			
ℓ 453	11th	Gospels^{esk}	αω	?	Owner Unknown			
ℓ 454	9th	Gospels^{P}	ΑΩ	2	Trinity College Dublin, IE TCD MS 31 fol. IV (fol. 1-237)	Dublin	Ireland	TCD
ℓ 455	10th	†Gospels^{esk}	αω	182	Toledo Cathedral, CT. B. 31-31, p. 53-415	Toledo	Spain	
ℓ 456	13th	Gospels^{esk}	αω	?	Owner Unknown			
ℓ 457	14th	†Gospels^{esk}	αω	?	Owner Unknown			
ℓ 458	15th	†Gospels^{e}	αω	?	Owner Unknown			
[ℓ 459]								
[ℓ 460]								
[ℓ 461]								
ℓ 462	17th	Gospels^{e}	αω	463	Byzantine and Christian Museum, 11	Athens	Greece	
ℓ 463	12th	Gospels^{P}	αω	41	Exarchist Monastery of Saint Mary, A. a. 7	Grottaferrata	Italy	
ℓ 463	12th	Gospels^{P}	αω	4	Vatican Library, Vat. gr. 2112, fol. 72-75	Vatican City	Vatican	
ℓ 464	12th	†Gospels^{e}	αω	292	Exarchist Monastery of Saint Mary, A. a. 9	Grottaferrata	Italy	
ℓ 465	11th	Gospels^{esk}	αω	246	Exarchist Monastery of Saint Mary, A. a. 10	Grottaferrata	Italy	
ℓ 466	13th	Gospels^{(e)sk}	αω P^{O}	255?	Exarchist Monastery of Saint Mary, A. a. 11; A. α. 13	Grottaferrata	Italy	
ℓ 467	10th	Gospels^{P}	αω	97	Exarchist Monastery of Saint Mary, A. a. 12	Grottaferrata	Italy	
[ℓ 468]								
ℓ 469	12th	Gospels^{P}	αω	73	Exarchist Monastery of Saint Mary, A. a. 14	Grottaferrata	Italy	
ℓ 470	11th	Gospels^{P}	αω	69	Exarchist Monastery of Saint Mary, A. a. 15	Grottaferrata	Italy	
ℓ 471	11th	Gospels^{P}	αω	55	Exarchist Monastery of Saint Mary, A. a. 16	Grottaferrata	Italy	
ℓ 472	11th	Gospels^{P}	αω	2	Exarchist Monastery of Saint Mary, Z. d. 120, fol. 18. 19	Grottaferrata	Italy	
ℓ 473	10th	Gospels + Apostles^{Lit}	αω	155	Exarchist Monastery of Saint Mary, A. d. 2	Grottaferrata	Italy	
ℓ 474	12th	Gospels^{esk}	αω	165	Auckland City Libraries, Med G123	Auckland	New Zealand	CSNTM
ℓ 475	13th	Gospels + Apostles^{Lit}	αω P^{O}	257	Exarchist Monastery of Saint Mary, A. d. 4	Grottaferrata	Italy	
ℓ 476	15th	Gospels + Apostles^{Lit}	αω	341	University of Michigan, MS 67	Ann Arbor, MI	USA	CSNTM
ℓ 477	11th/12th	Gospels + Apostles^{sel}	αω	109	Lambeth Palace, MS1194	London	UK	LP
ℓ 478	11th	Gospels + Apostles^{Lit}	αω	55	Exarchist Monastery of Saint Mary, A. b. 2, fol. 159-213	Grottaferrata	Italy	
ℓ 479	12th	†Gospels + Apostles^{esk}	αω	87	Austrian National Library, Theol. gr. 308	Vienna	Austria	CSNTM
ℓ 480	10th/11th	†Gospels^{esk}	αω P^{U}	166	Exarchist Monastery of Saint Mary, E. a. 1	Grottaferrata	Italy	
ℓ 481	10th	Gospels^{P}	αω P^{U}	24	Exarchist Monastery of Saint Mary, E. a. 1	Grottaferrata	Italy	
ℓ 482	10th	Gospels^{P}	ΑΩ P^{U}	38	Exarchist Monastery of Saint Mary, B. b. 10	Grottaferrata	Italy	
ℓ 483	10th	Gospels^{P}	αω P^{U}	21	Exarchist Monastery of Saint Mary, D. d. 6	Grottaferrata	Italy	
ℓ 484	10th	Gospels^{P}	αω P^{U}	1	Exarchist Monastery of Saint Mary, G. g. 3	Grottaferrata	Italy	
ℓ 485	10th	Gospels^{P}	αω P^{U}	54	Exarchist Monastery of Saint Mary, B. a. 5	Grottaferrata	Italy	
ℓ 486	12th/13th	Gospels^{P}	αω	1	Exarchist Monastery of Saint Mary, Z. a. 2	Grottaferrata	Italy	
ℓ 487	17th	Gospels^{P-Lit}	αω	170	Exarchist Monastery of Saint Mary, G. a. 18	Grottaferrata	Italy	
ℓ 488	11th	Gospels + Apostles^{Lit}	αω	151	Exarchist Monastery of Saint Mary, G. b. 2	Grottaferrata	Italy	
ℓ 489	13th	Gospels + Apostles^{Lit}	αω	101	Exarchist Monastery of Saint Mary, G. b. 6	Grottaferrata	Italy	
ℓ 490	9th	Gospels^{P-Lit}	αω	192	Exarchist Monastery of Saint Mary, G. b. 7	Grottaferrata	Italy	
ℓ 491	13th	Gospels^{P-Lit}	αω P^{O}	6	Exarchist Monastery of Saint Mary, G. b. 8	Grottaferrata	Italy	
ℓ 492	16th	Gospels + Apostles^{Lit}	αω	94	Exarchist Monastery of Saint Mary, G. b. 9	Grottaferrata	Italy	
ℓ 493	12th	Gospels^{Lit}	αω	20	Exarchist Monastery of Saint Mary, G. b. 11	Grottaferrata	Italy	
ℓ 494	13th	Gospels + Apostles^{Lit}	αω P^{O}	98	Exarchist Monastery of Saint Mary, G. b. 12	Grottaferrata	Italy	
ℓ 495	13th	Gospels + Apostles^{Lit}	αω	188	Exarchist Monastery of Saint Mary, G. b. 13	Grottaferrata	Italy	
ℓ 496	13th	Gospels^{Lit}	αω P^{O}	54	Exarchist Monastery of Saint Mary, G. b. 14	Grottaferrata	Italy	
ℓ 497	12th	Gospels + Apostles^{Lit}	αω	42	Exarchist Monastery of Saint Mary, G. b. 15	Grottaferrata	Italy	
ℓ 498	16th	Gospels + Apostles^{Lit}	αω	269	Exarchist Monastery of Saint Mary, G. b. 17	Grottaferrata	Italy	
ℓ 499	13th	Luke 24:12-35; John 1:35-39	αω	2	National Library, Supplément Grec 687, fol. 11, 15	Paris	France	BnF, INTF
ℓ 500	16th	†Apostles^{e}	αω	143	Exarchist Monastery of Saint Mary, G. b. 17	Grottaferrata	Italy	

[top]

== Gallery ==
=== Uncial Lectionaries ===
Photos of Uncial Lectionaries

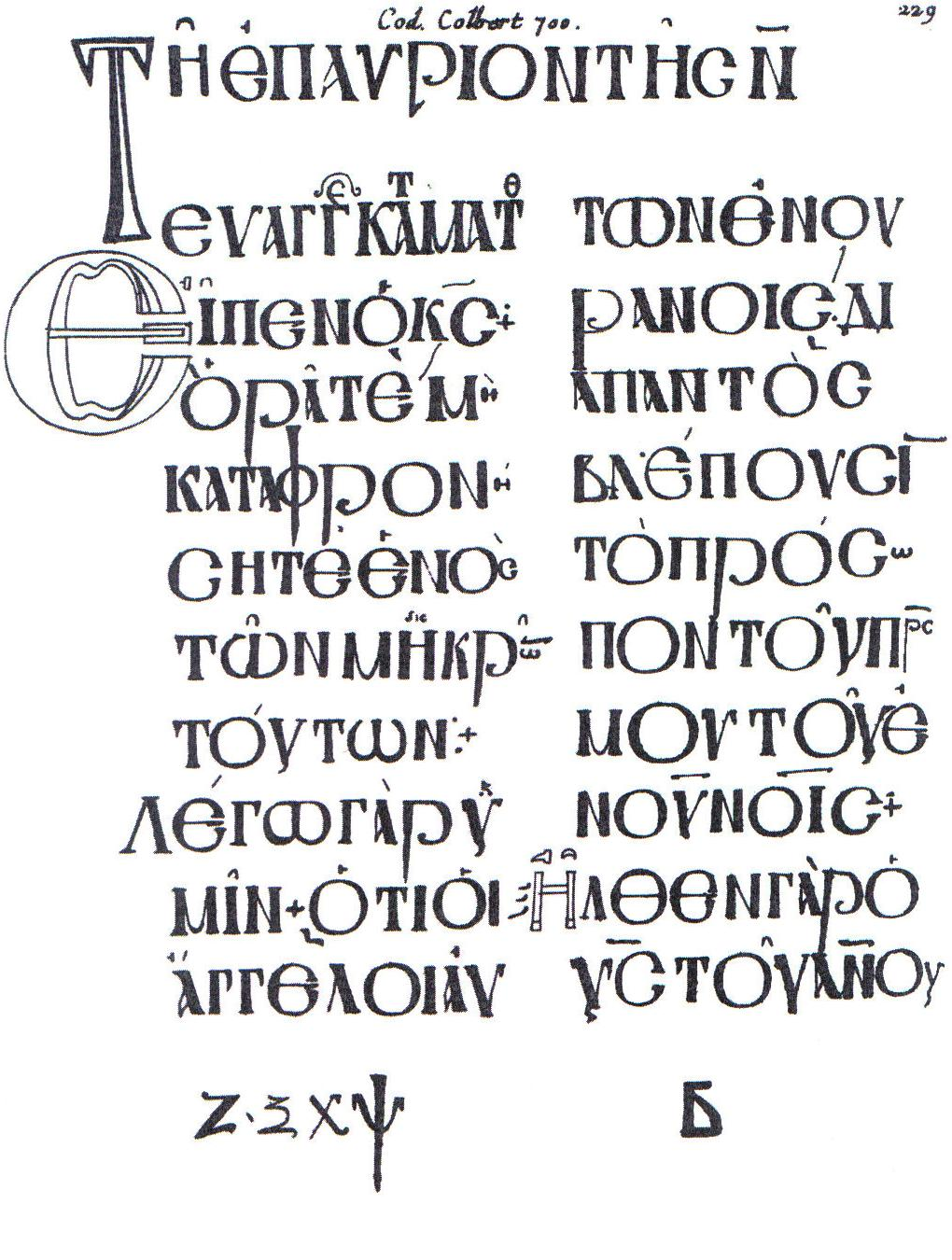
ℓ 1

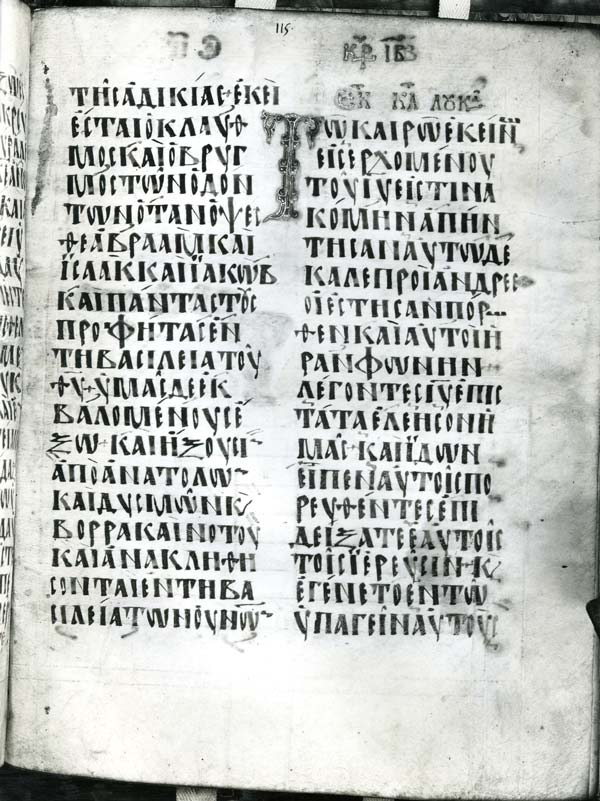
ℓ 5

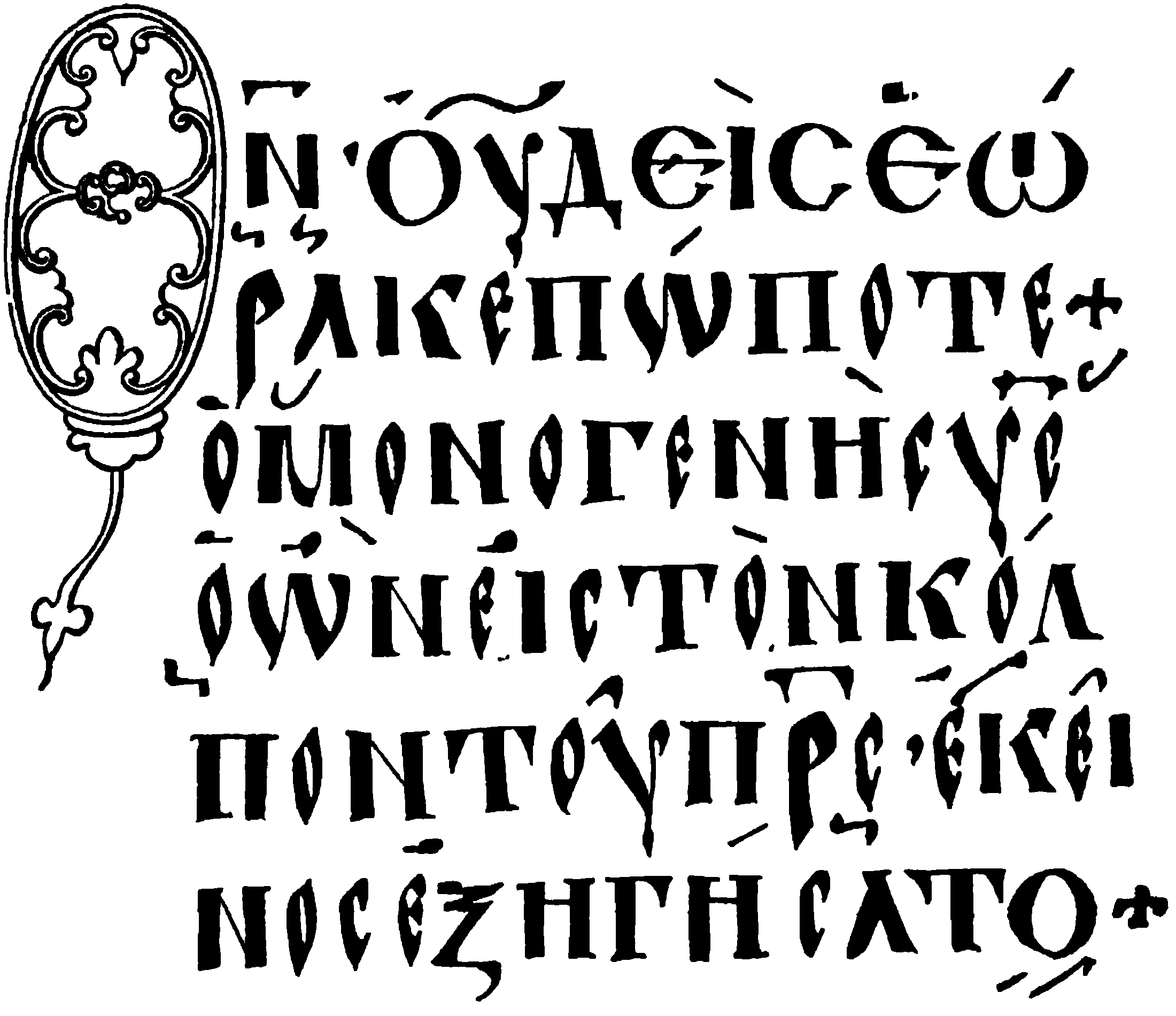
ℓ 150

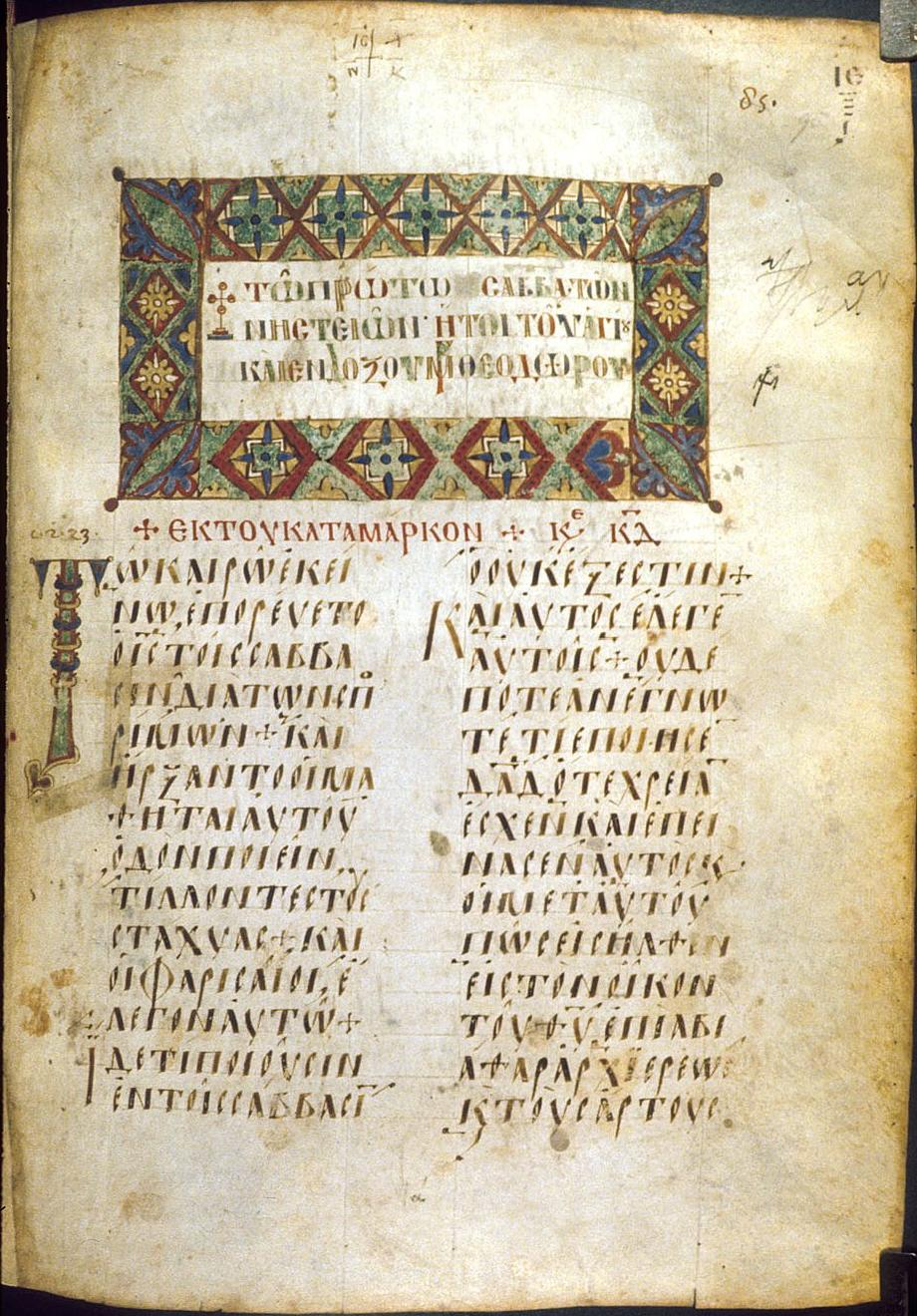
ℓ 152

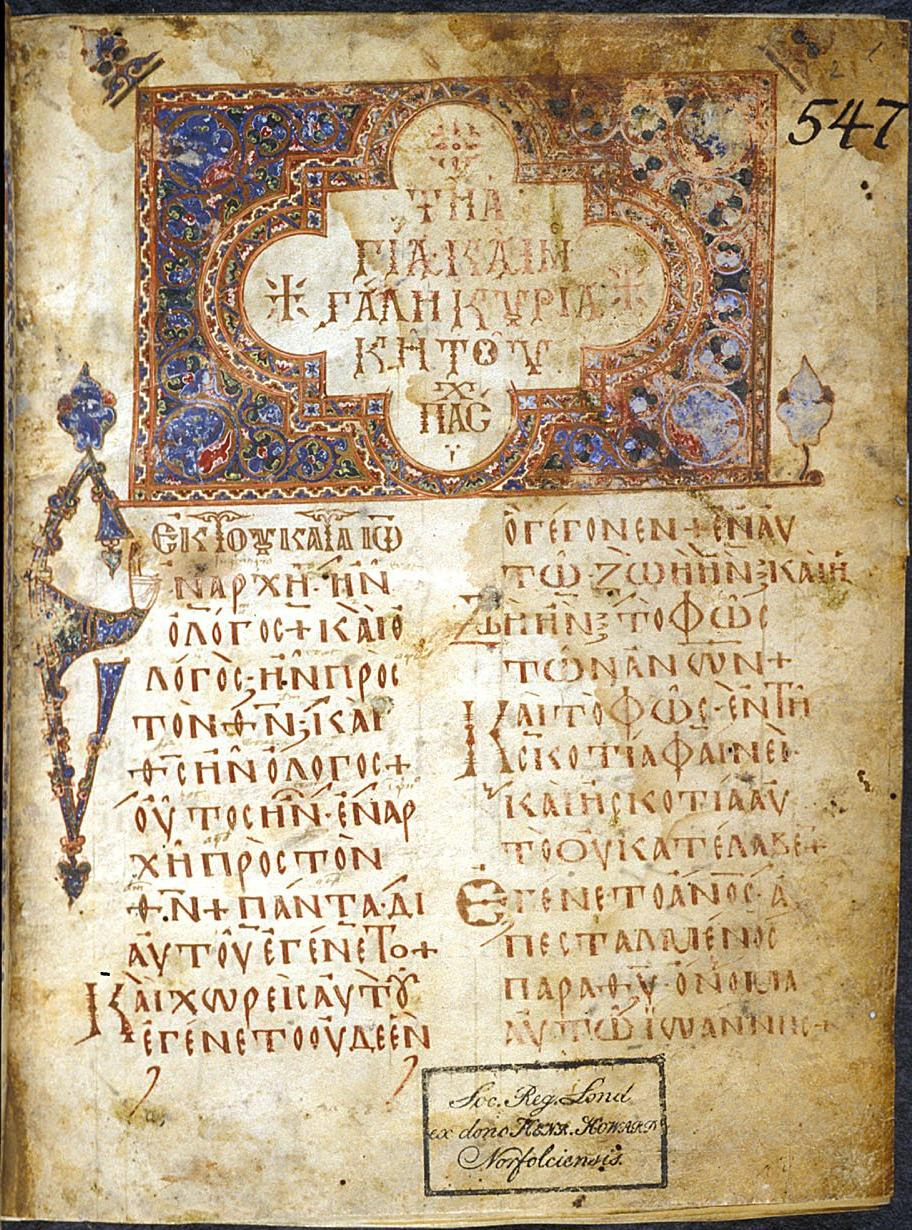
ℓ 183 folio 2

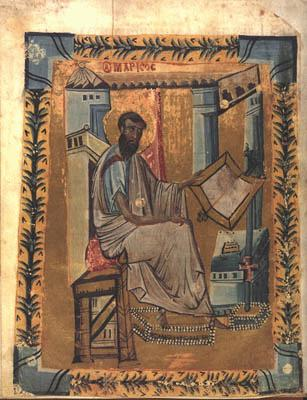
ℓ 243

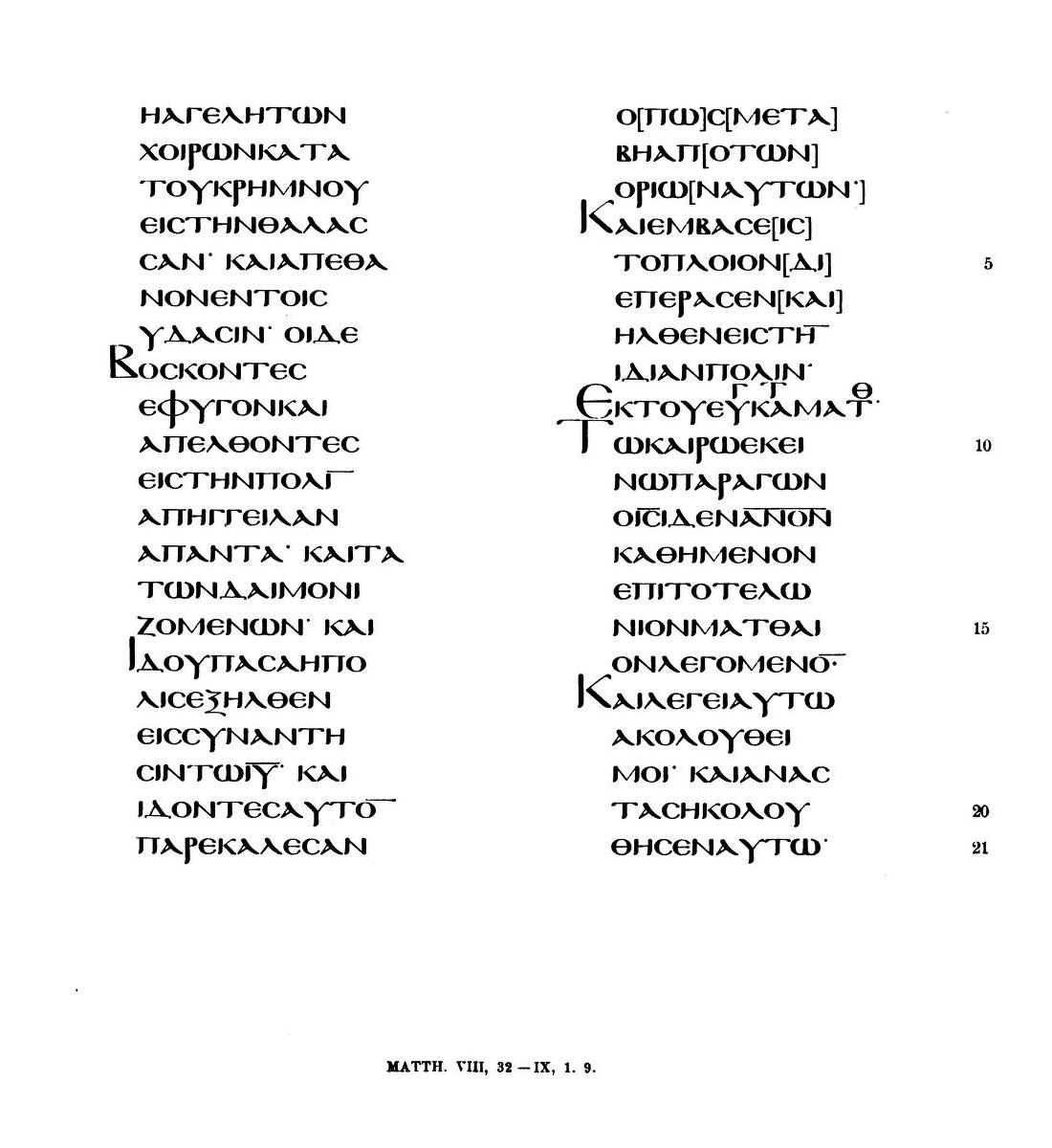
ℓ 269

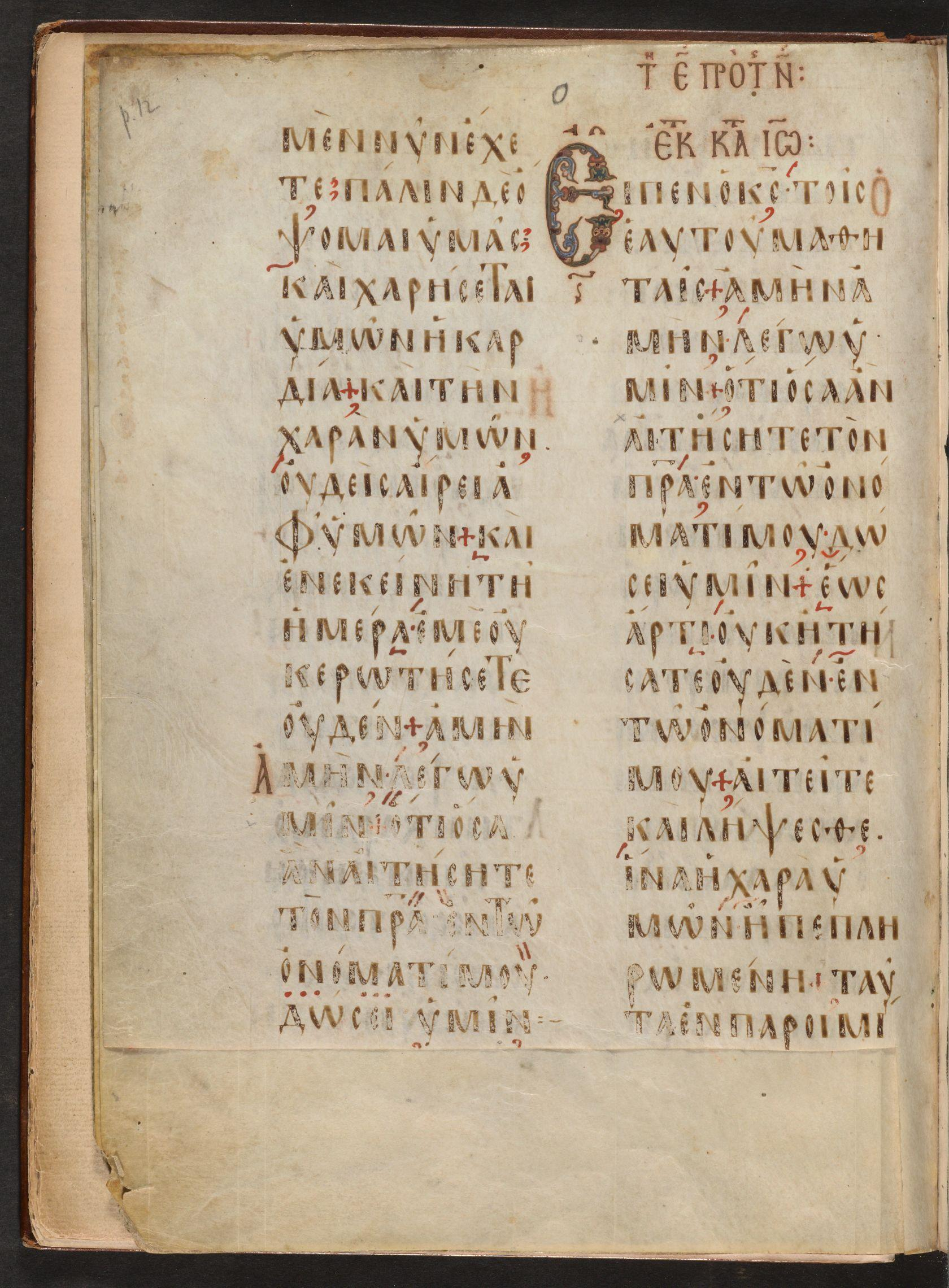
ℓ 296 folio 6 verso

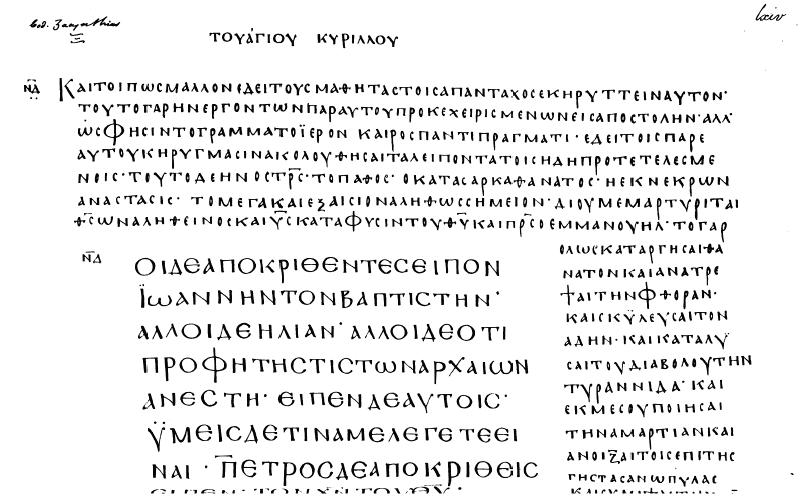
ℓ 299

=== Minuscule Lectionaries ===
Photos of Minuscule Lectionaries

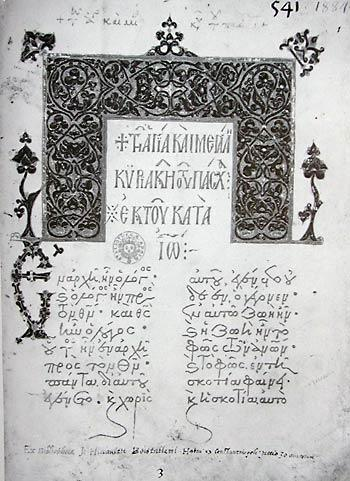
ℓ 86

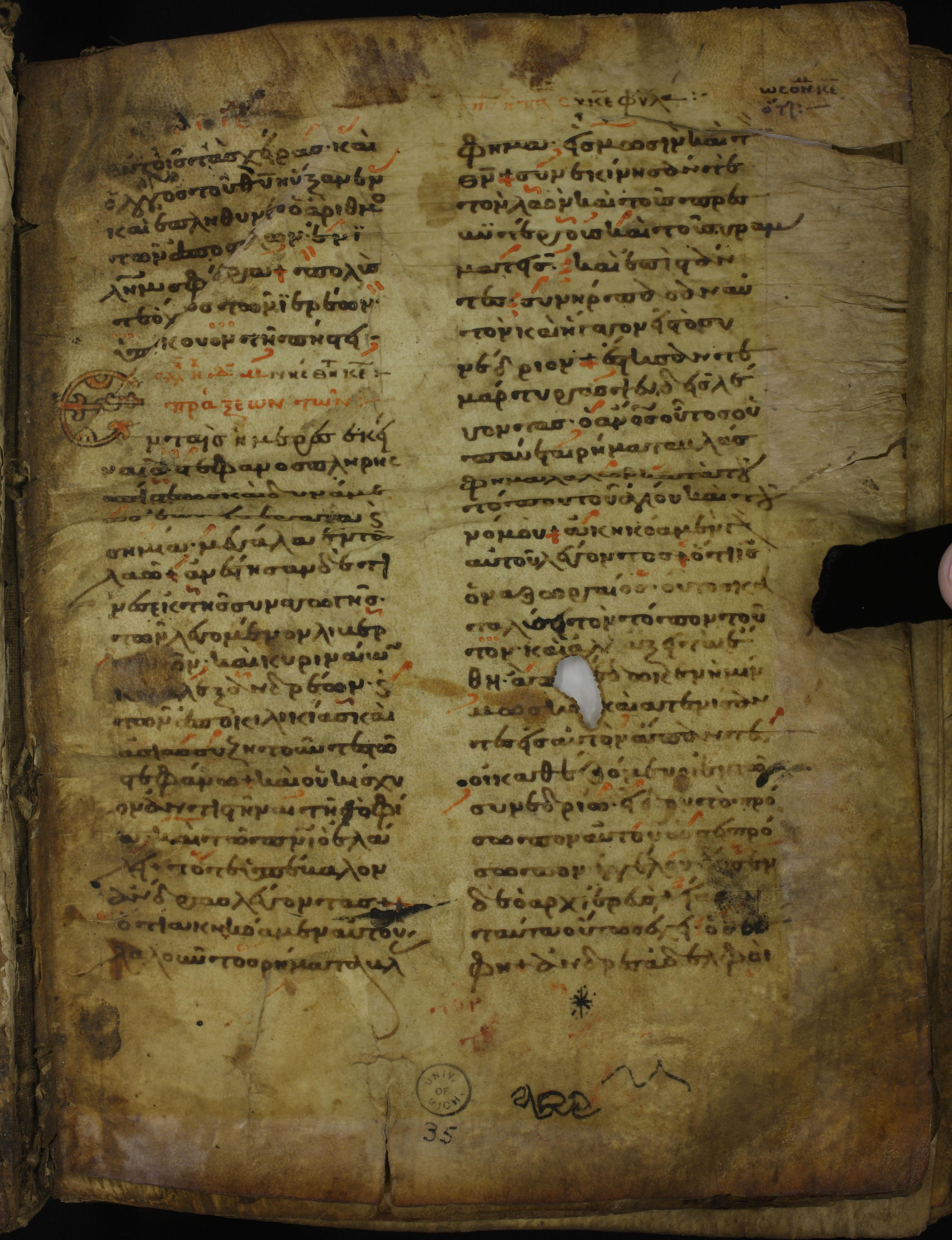
ℓ 170

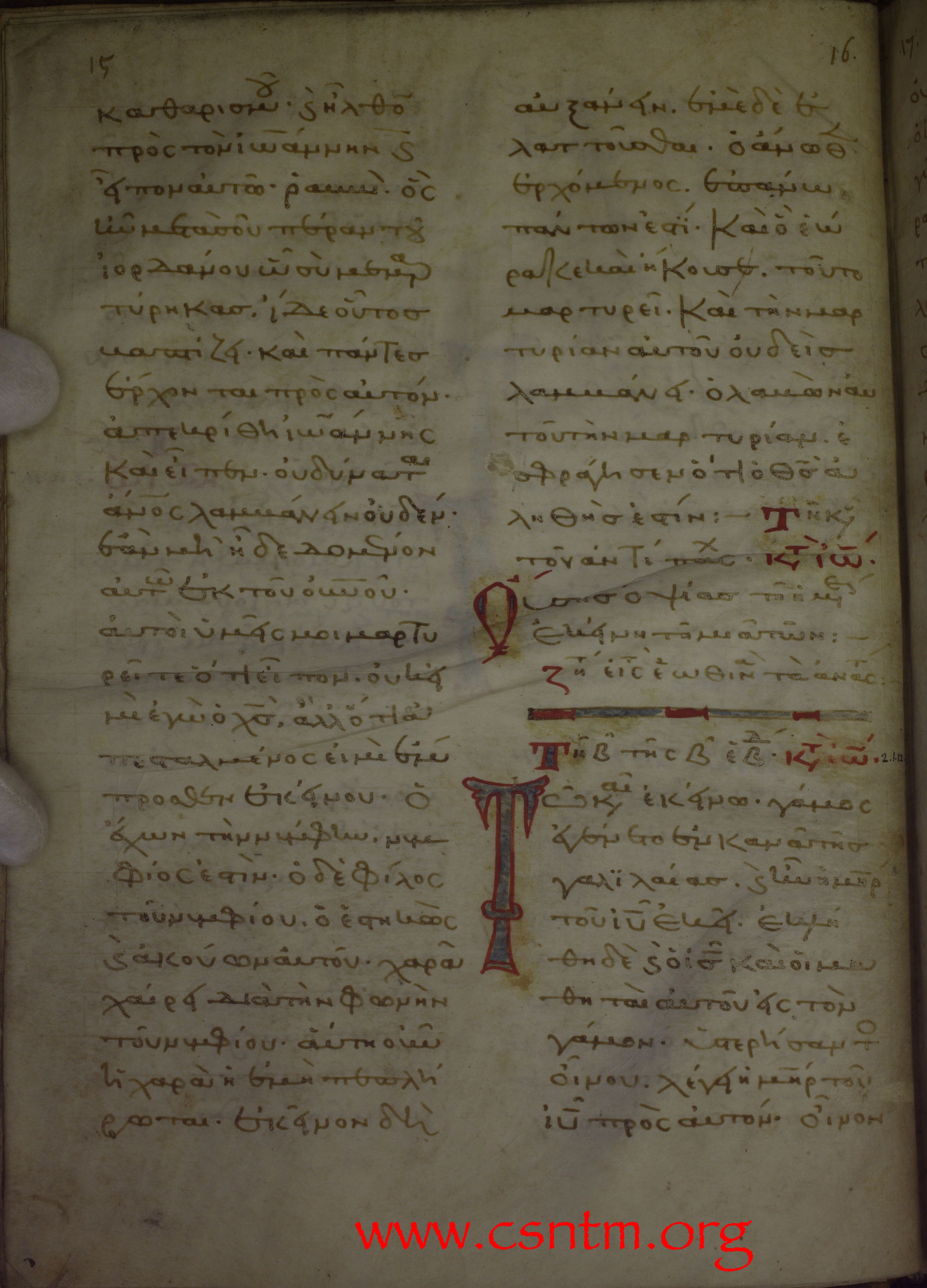
ℓ 185

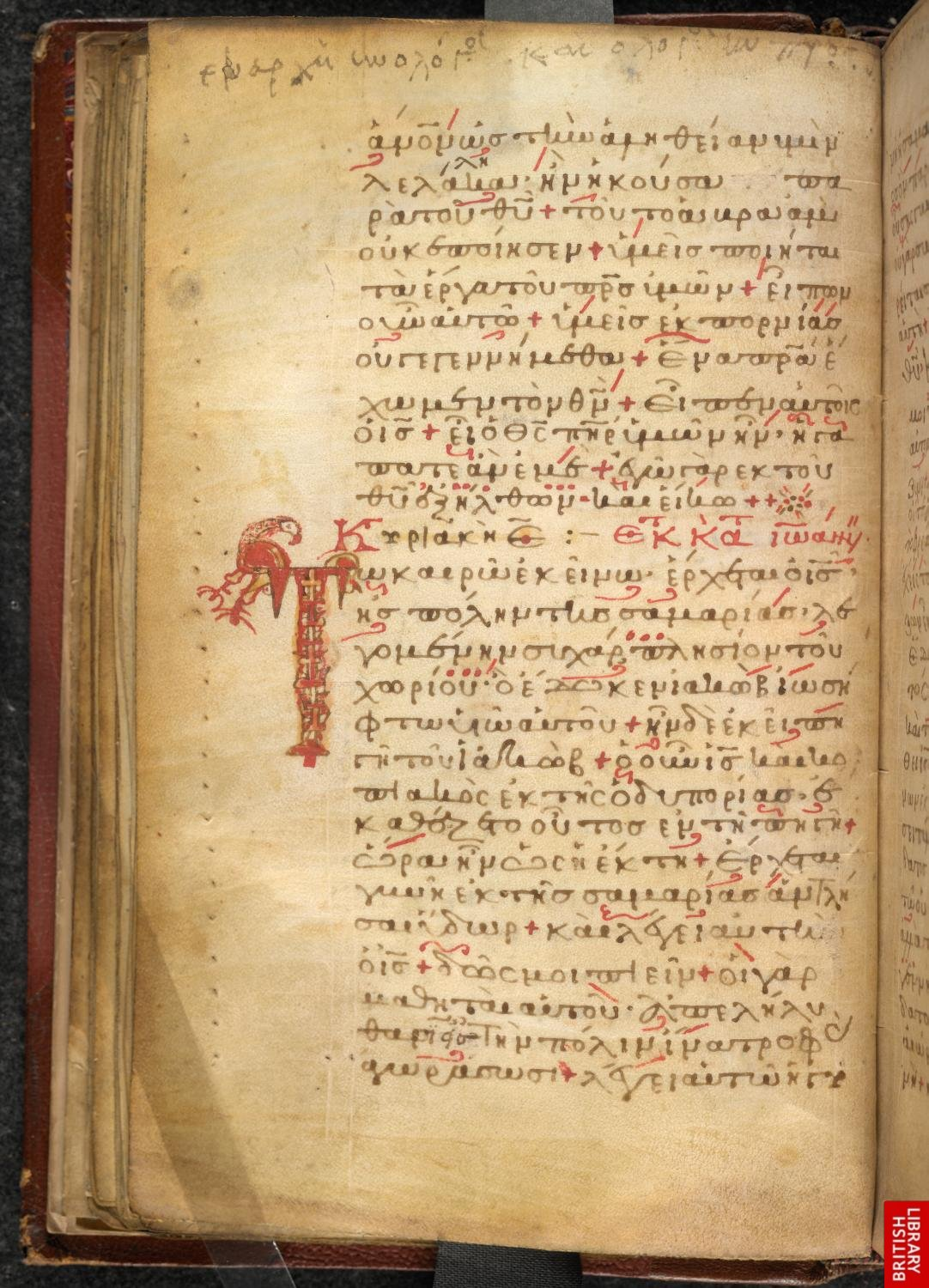
ℓ 187

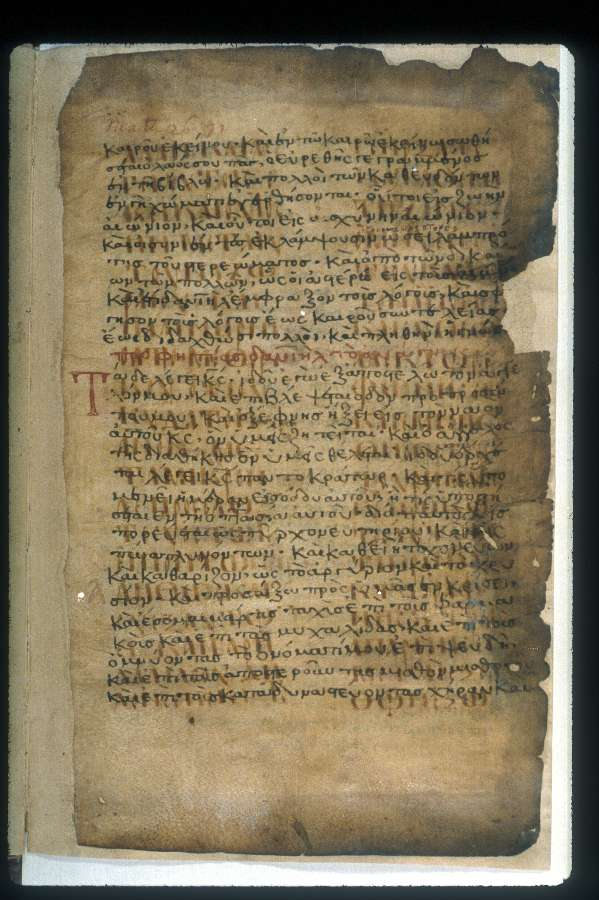
ℓ 205 Palimpsest

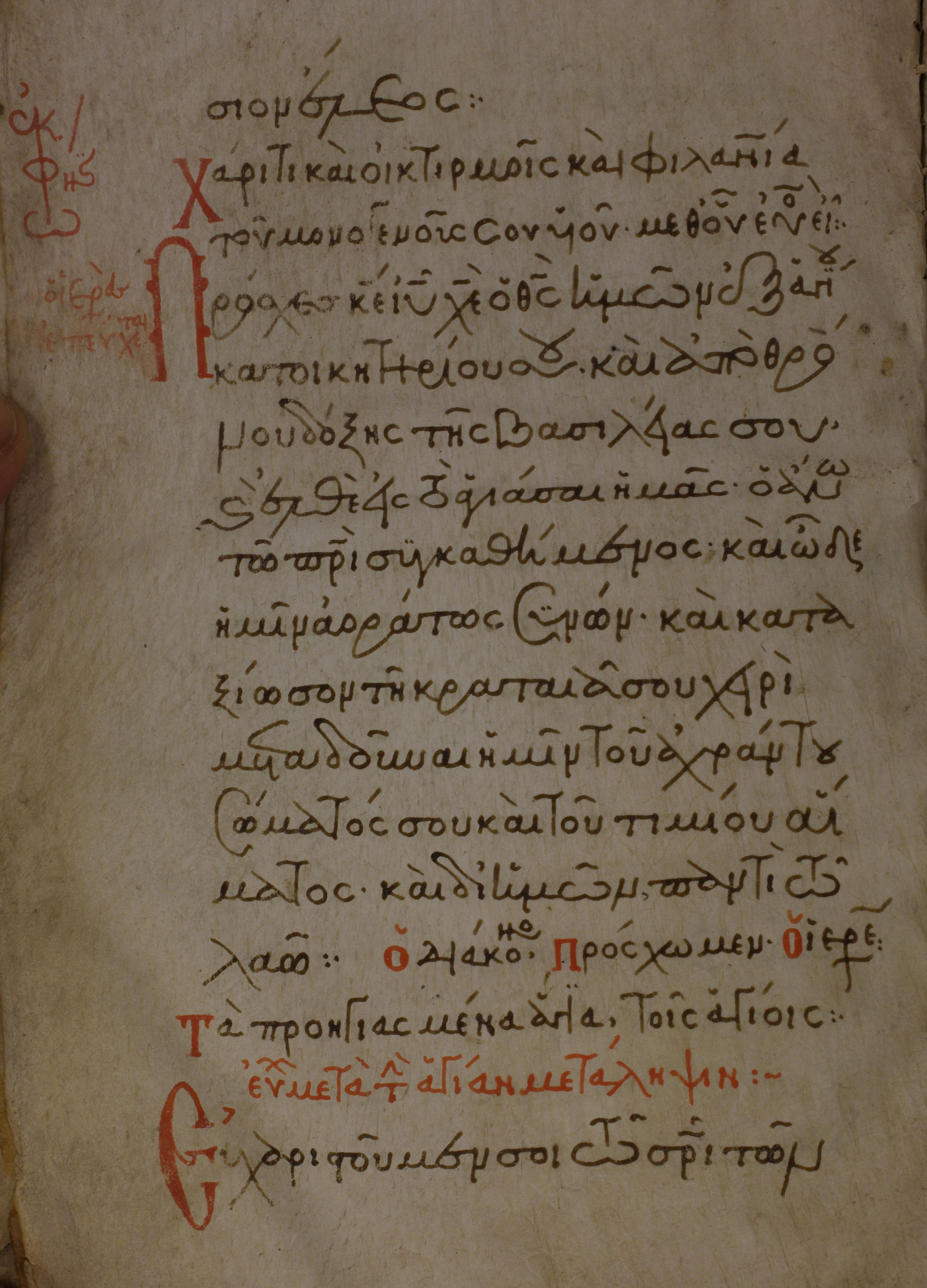
ℓ 216 folio 54

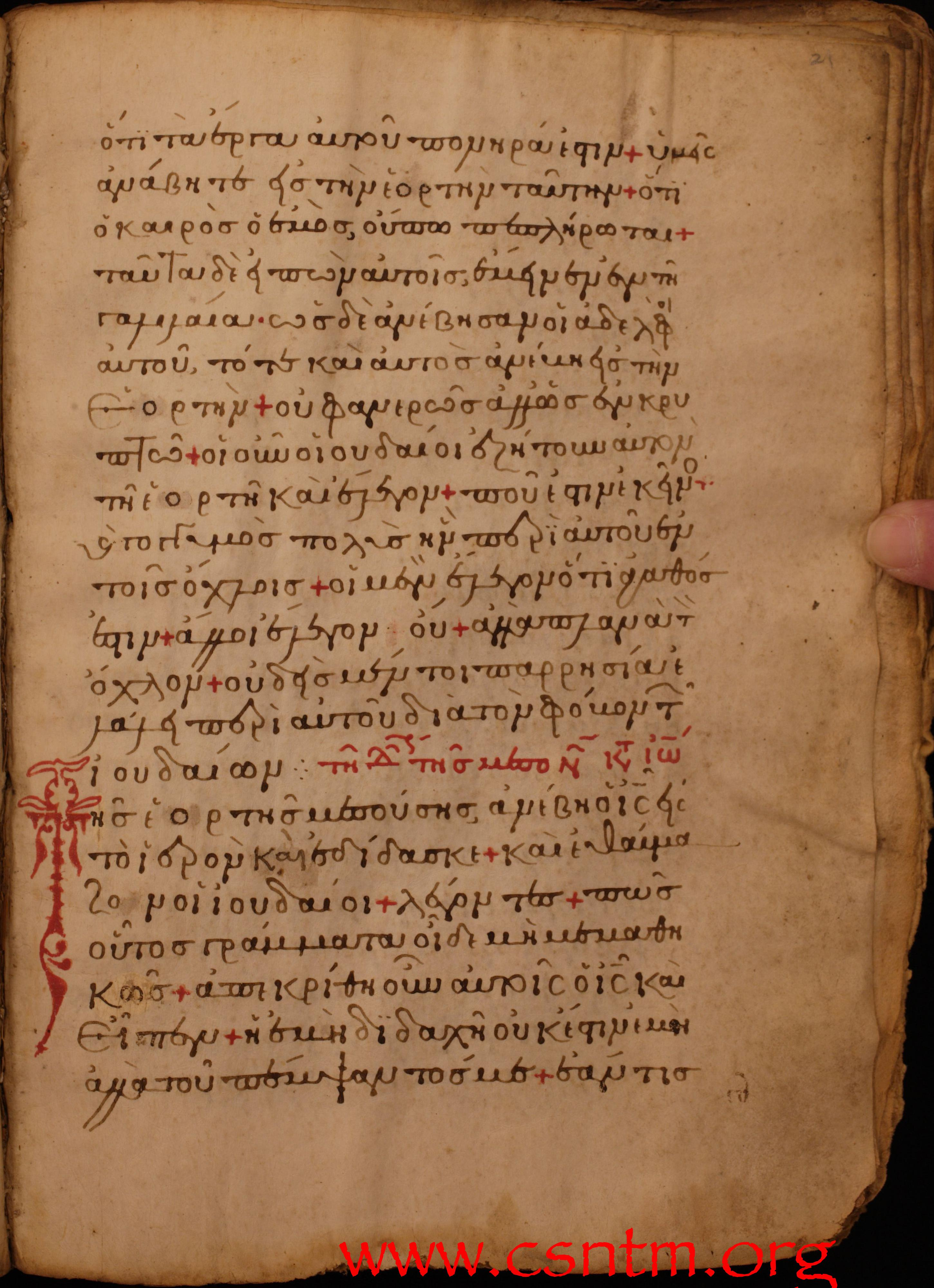
ℓ 220 folio 21 recto

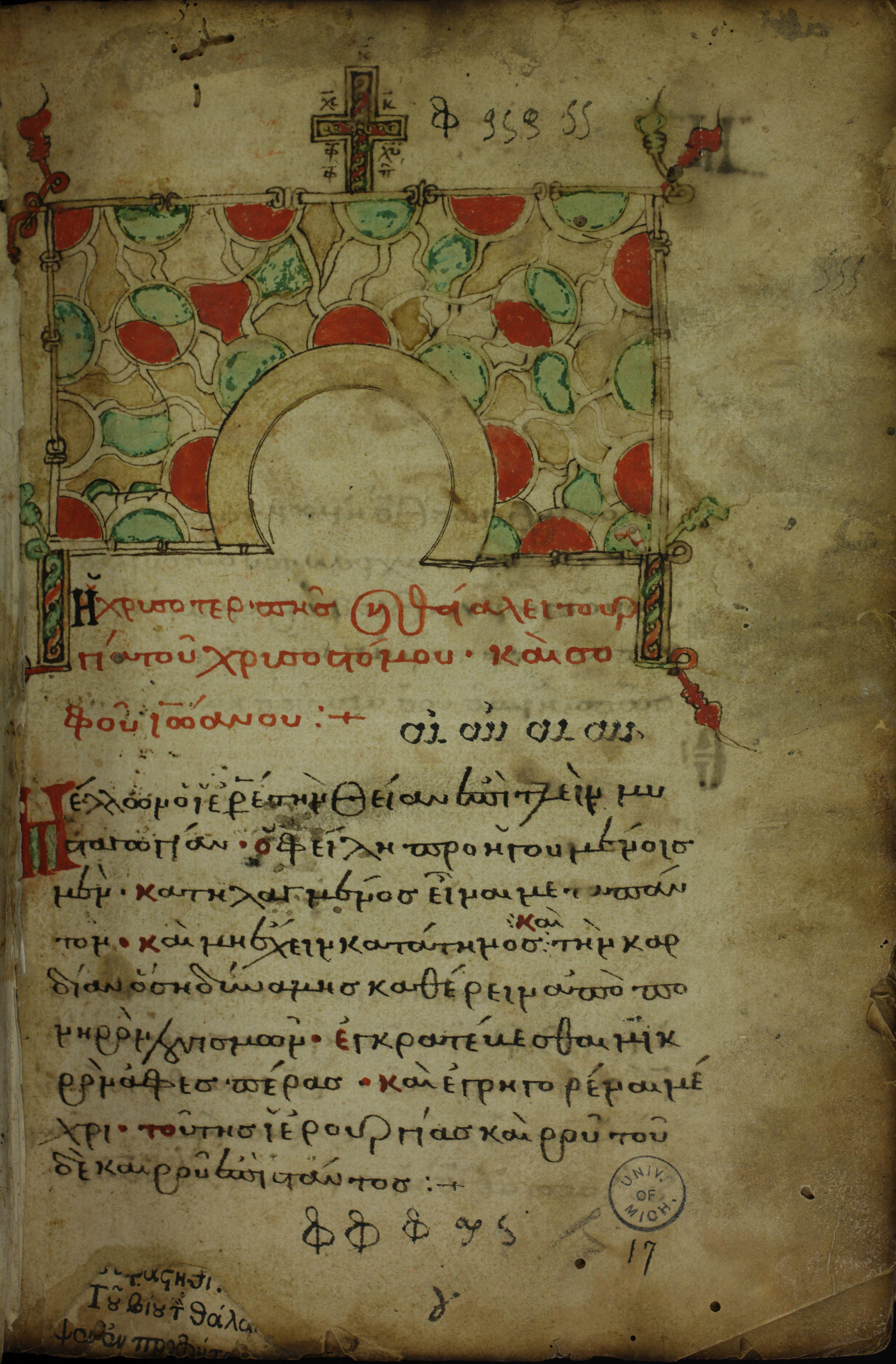
ℓ 223

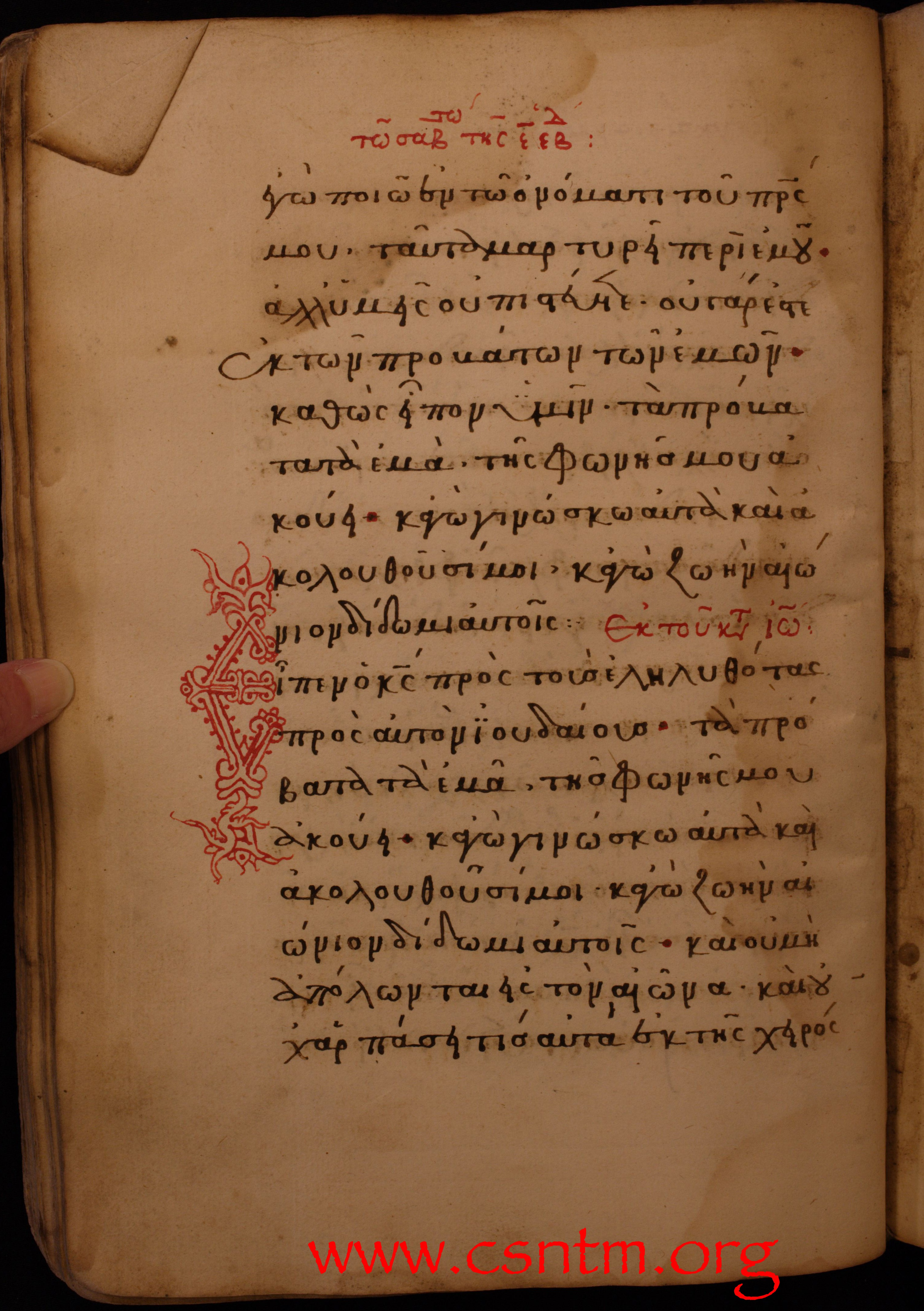
ℓ 225 folio 43 verso

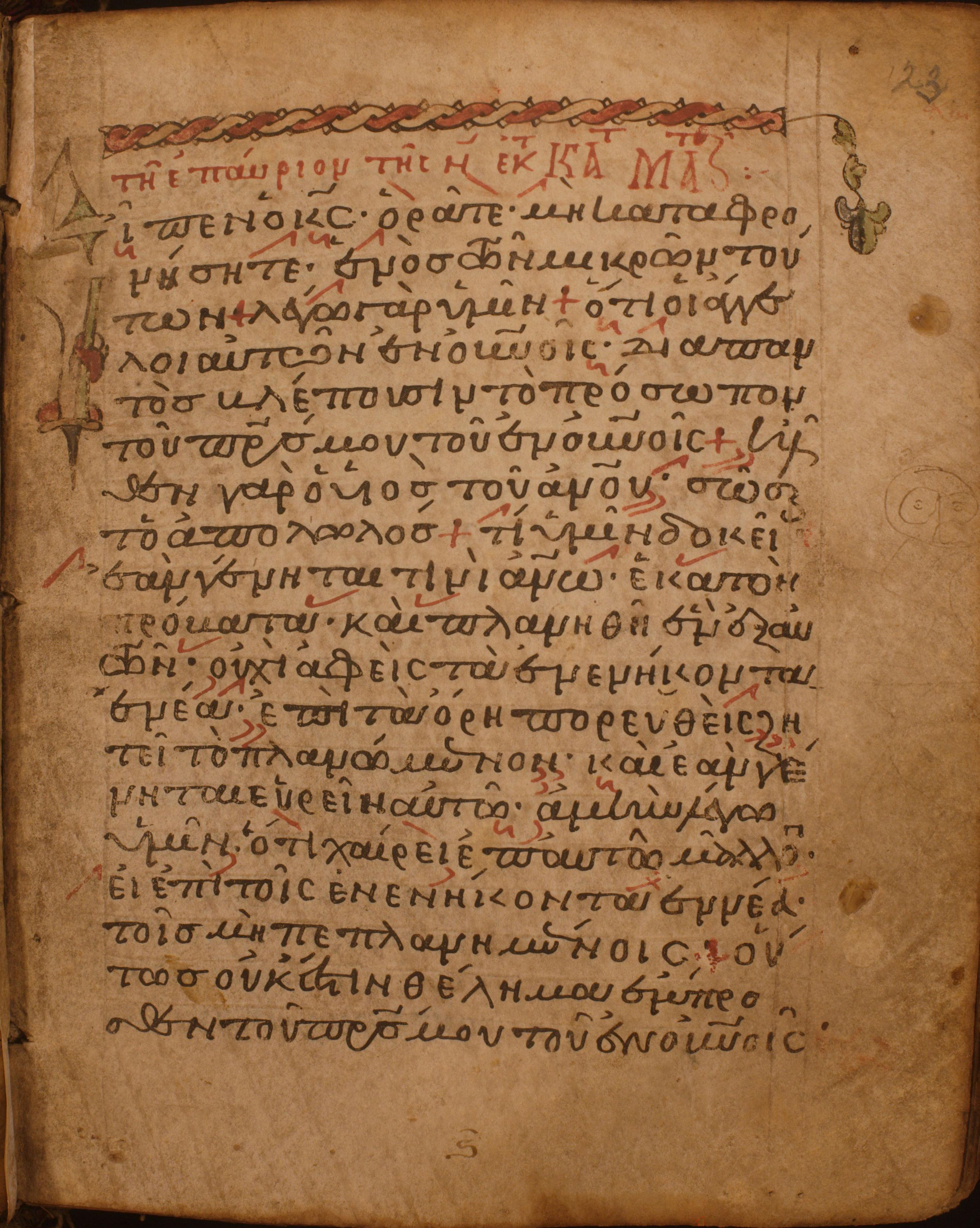
ℓ 226 folio 25 recto

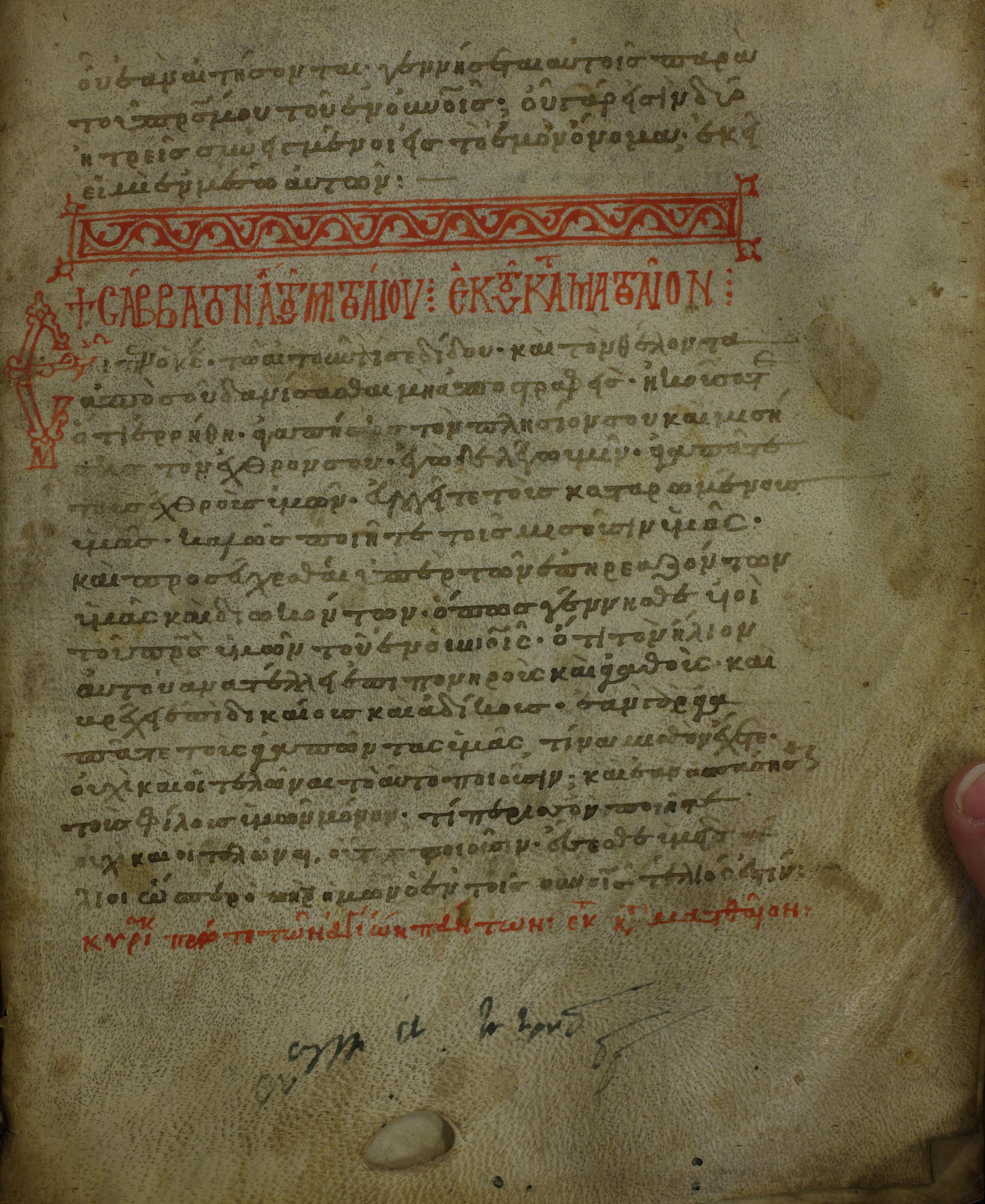
ℓ 227 folio 6 recto

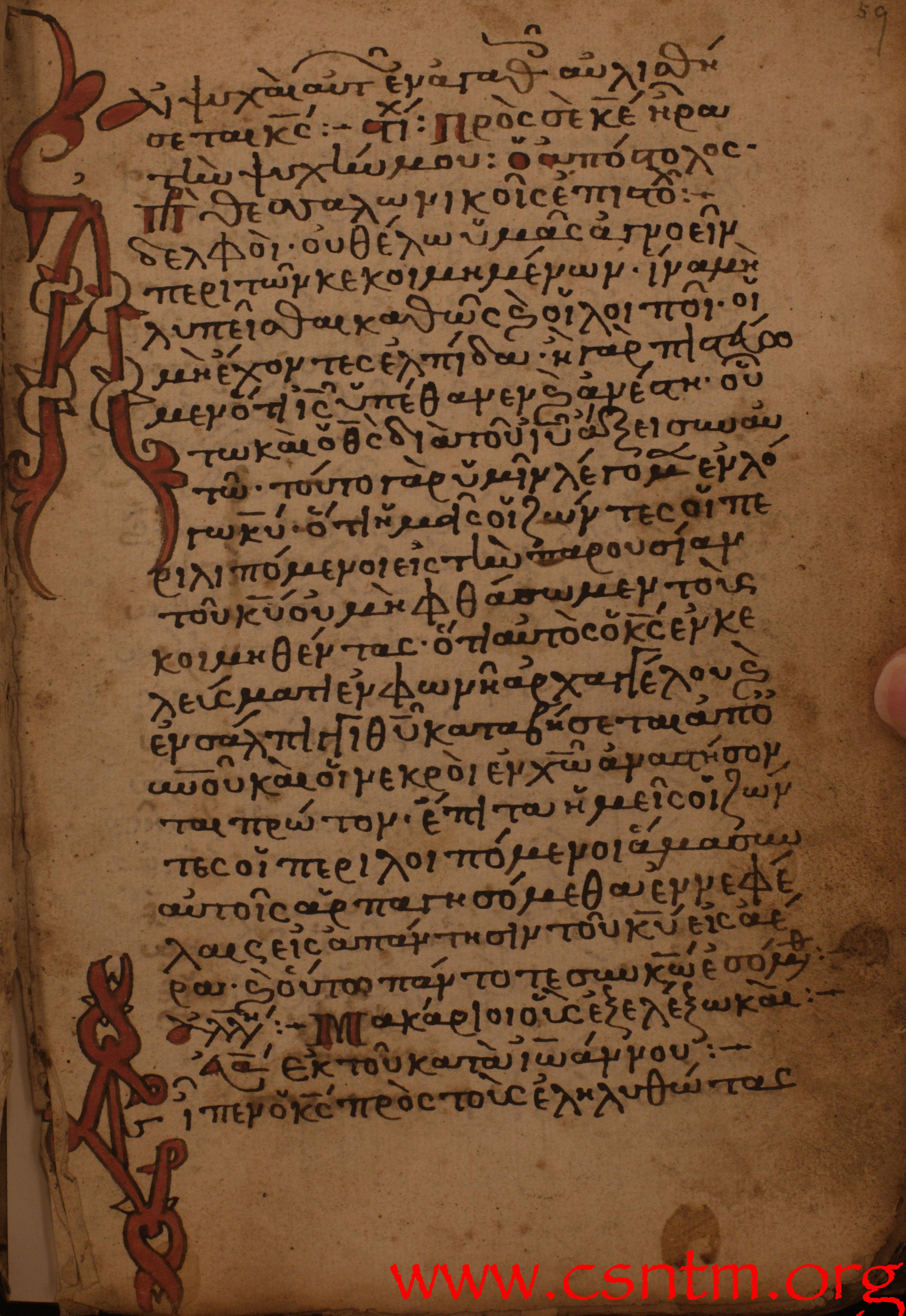
ℓ 228 folio 63 recto

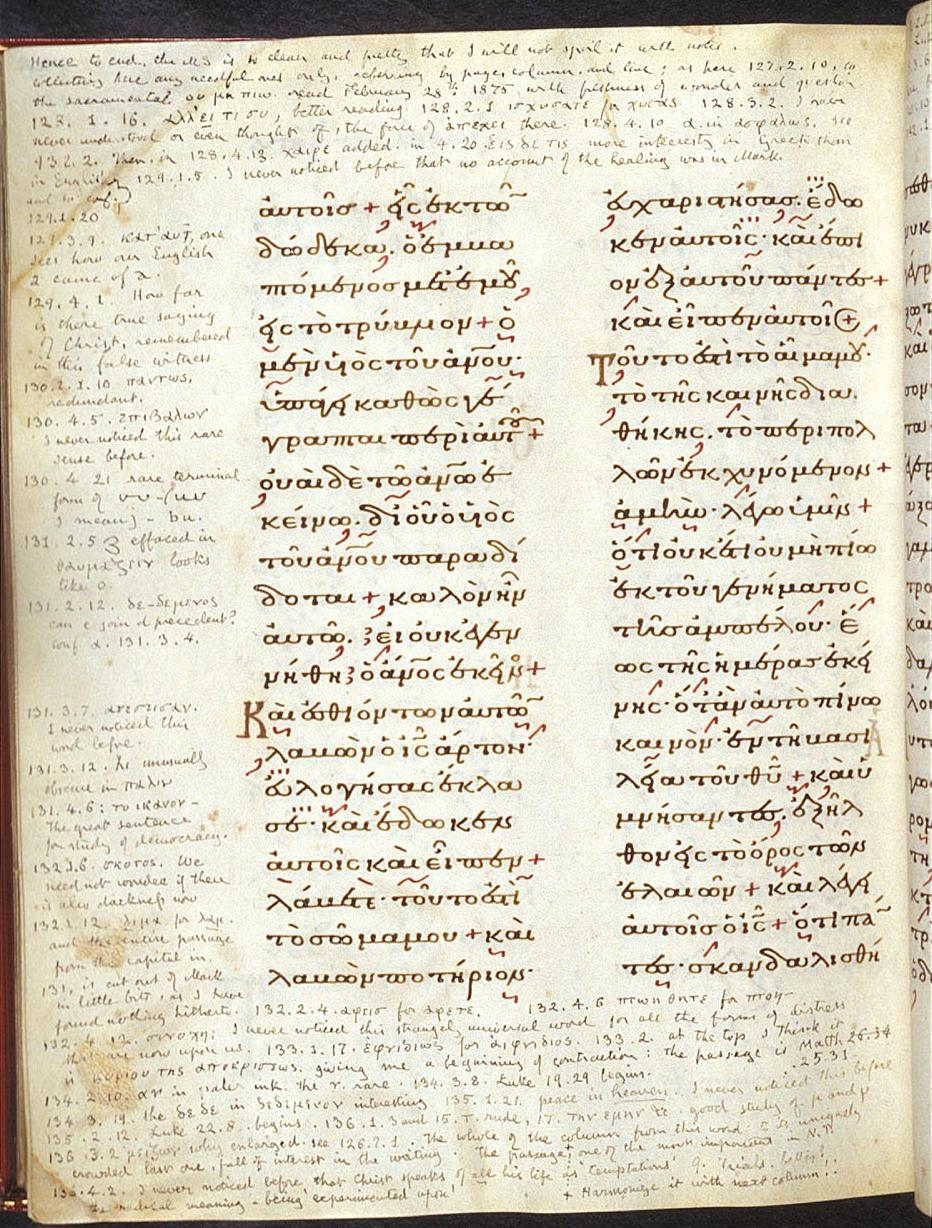
ℓ 238 folio 136 verso

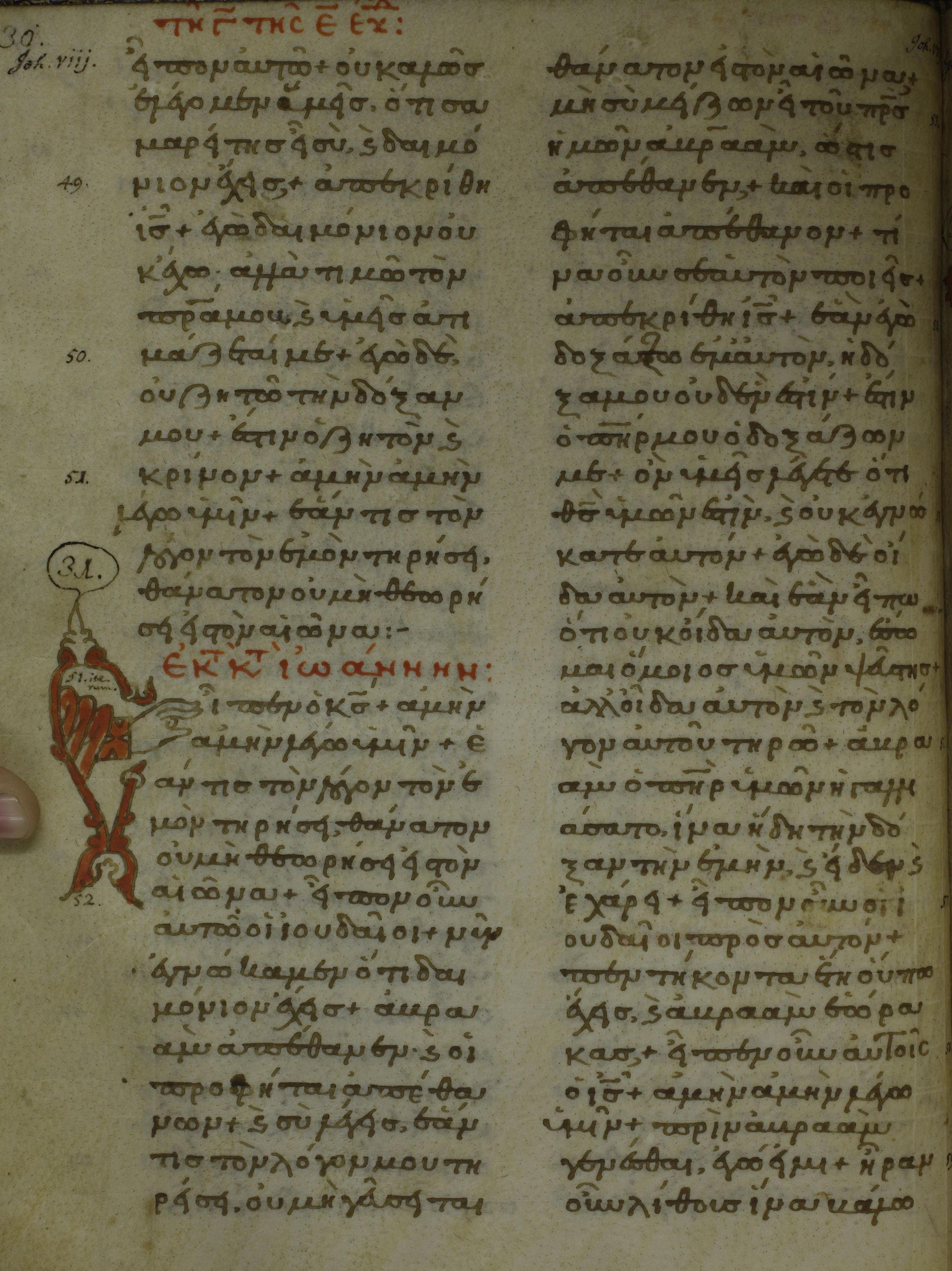
ℓ 239 folio 15 verso

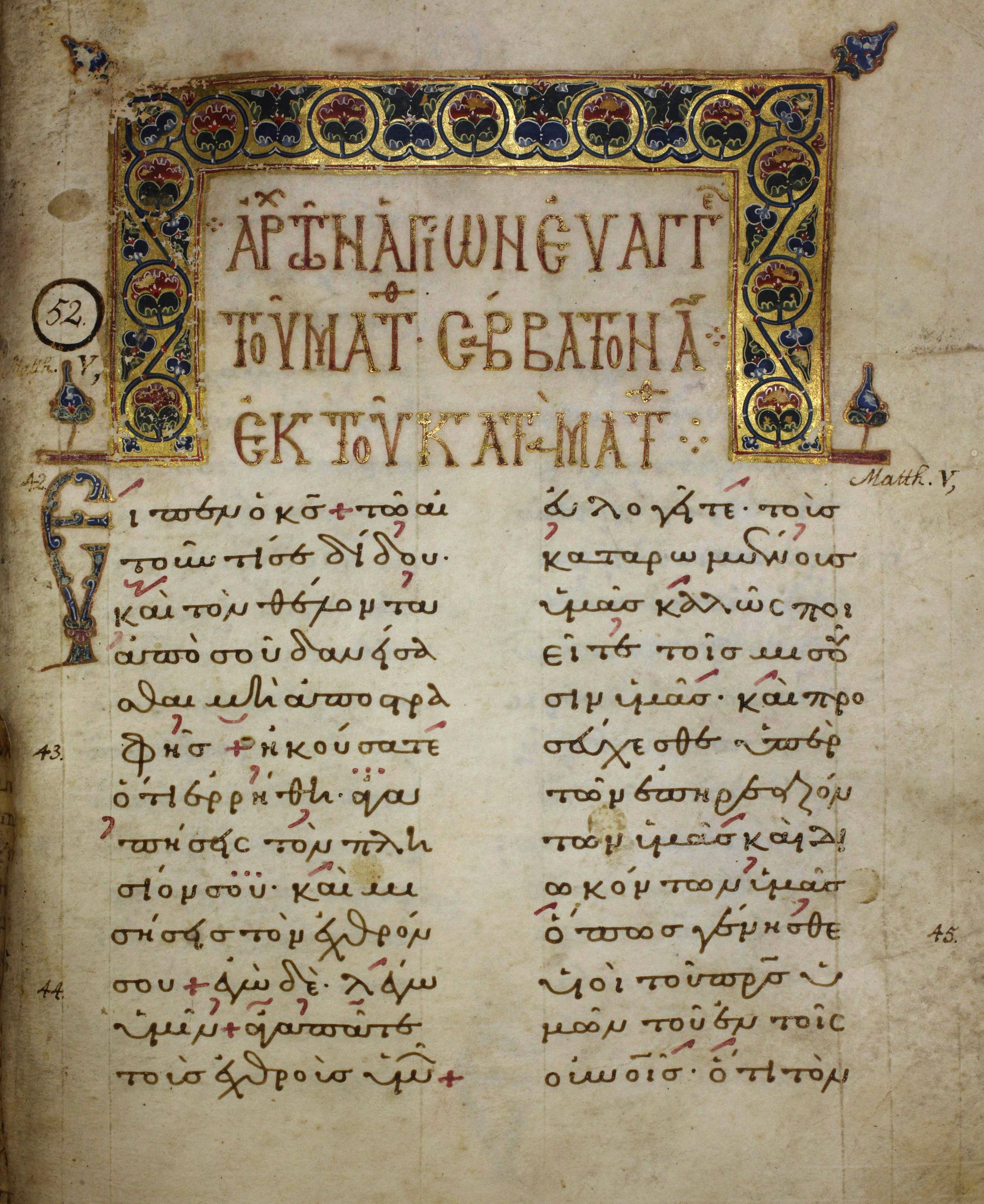
ℓ 240 folio 51 recto

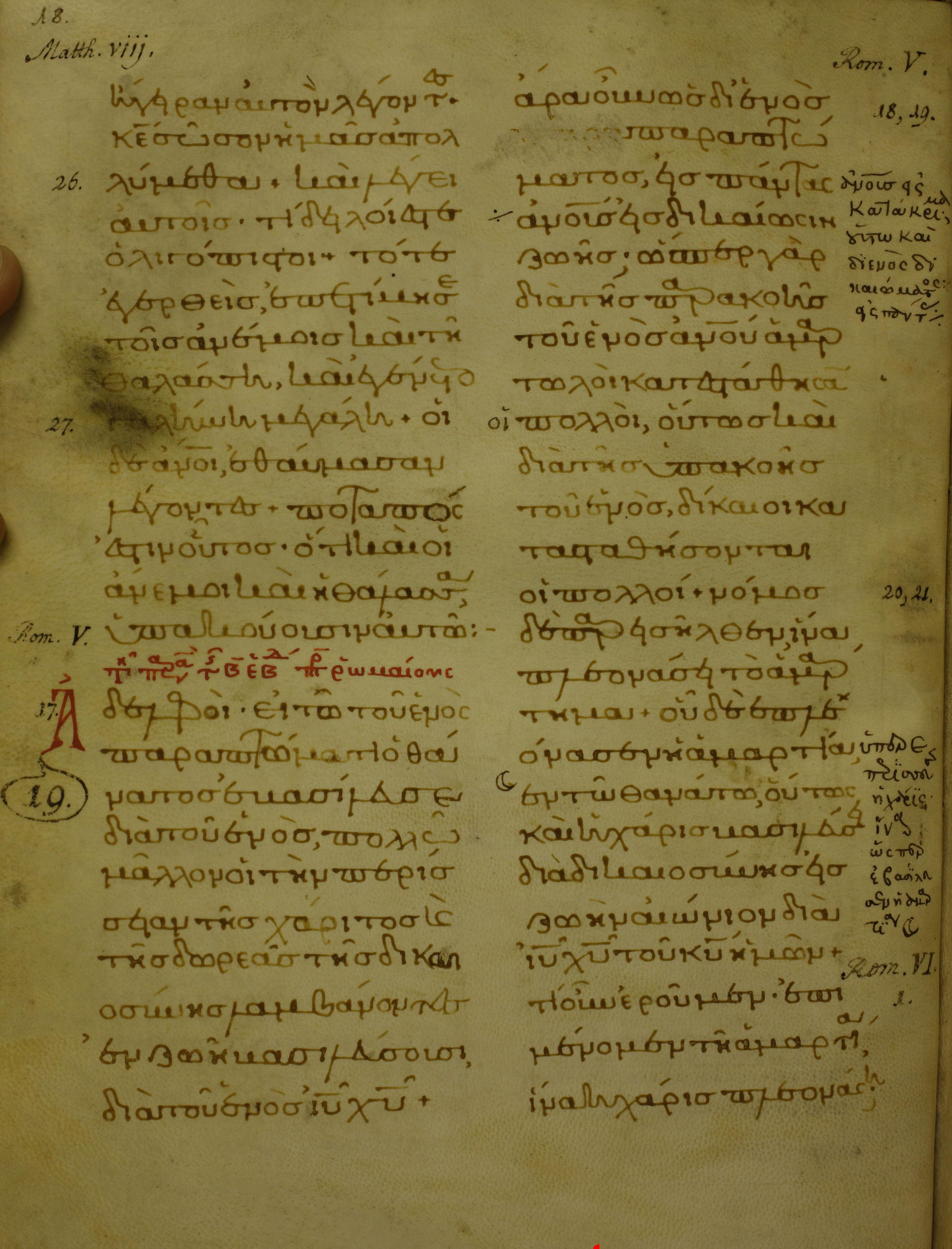
ℓ 241 folio 9 verso

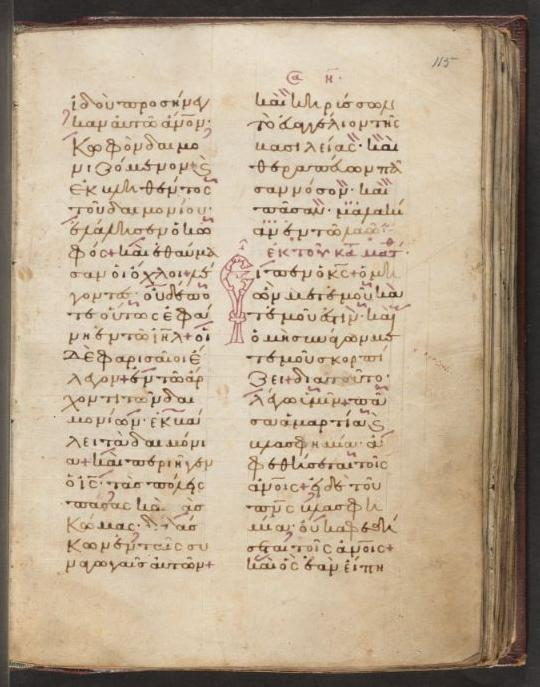
ℓ 297 folio 58 recto

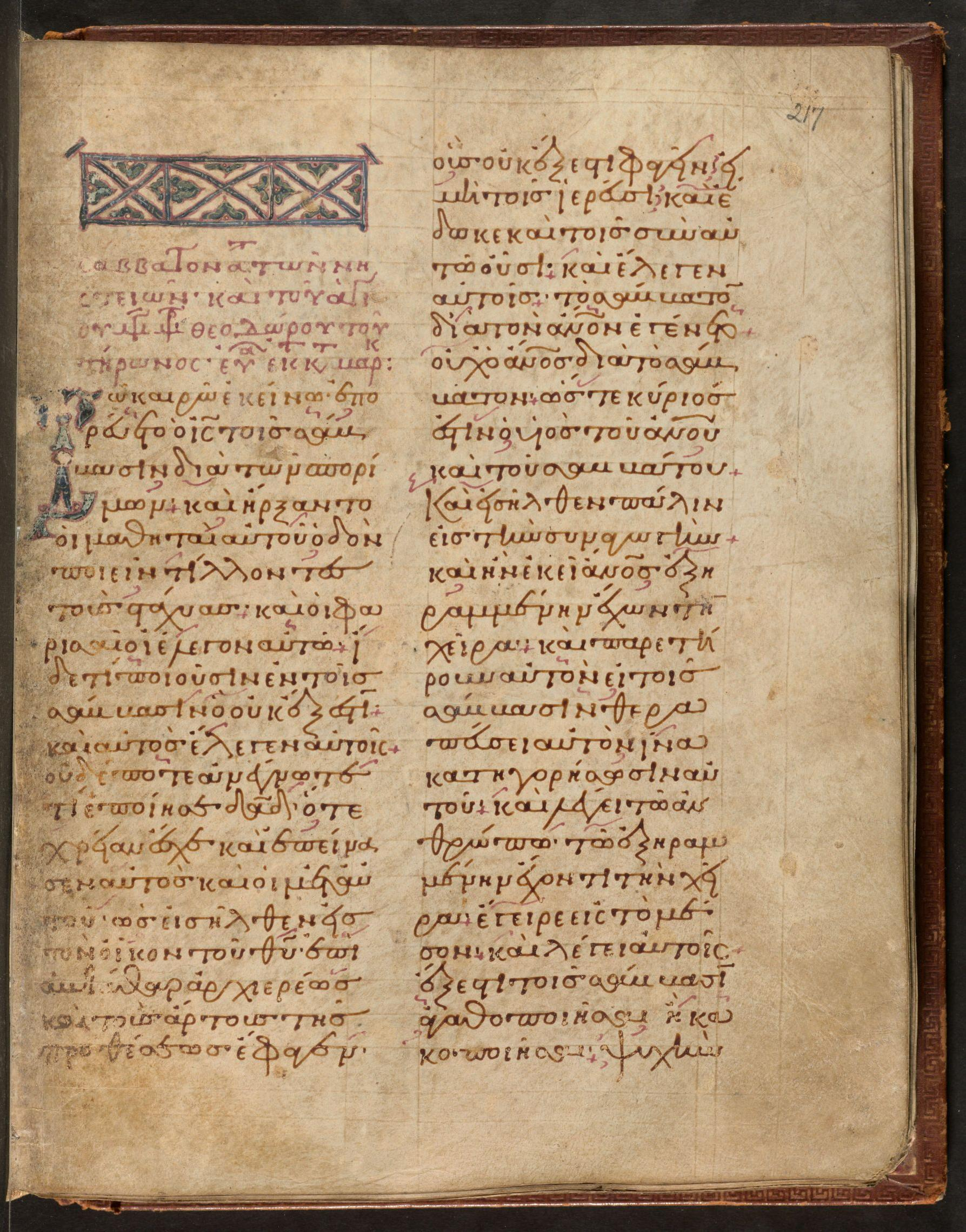
ℓ 298 folio 109 recto

== See also ==
Lists

- Categories of New Testament manuscripts
- List of New Testament papyri
- List of New Testament uncials
- List of New Testament minuscules
- List of New Testament Latin manuscripts

Articles

- Novum Testamentum Graece
- Biblical manuscript
- Palaeography
- Textual criticism

== Bibliography ==
- Dr. Peter M. Head. The Early Greek Bible Manuscript Project: New Testament Lectionary Manuscripts.
- K. Aland, M. Welte, B. Köster, K. Junack, Kurzgefasste Liste der griechischen Handschriften des Neuen Testaments, Walter de Gruyter, Berlin, New York 1994, pp. 219 ff.
- Aland, Kurt; Barbara Aland (1995). The Text of the New Testament: An Introduction to the Critical Editions and to the Theory and Practice of Modern Textual Criticism. Translated by Erroll F. Rhodes (2nd ed.). Grand Rapids, Michigan: William B. Eerdmans Publishing Co. ISBN 0-8028-4098-1.
- Seid, Timothy. "A Table of Greek Manuscripts". Interpreting Ancient Manuscripts. Retrieved June 22, 2007.
- Black M., Aland K., Die alten Übersetzungen des Neuen Testaments, die Kirchenväterzitate und Lektionare: der gegenwärtige Stand ihrer Erforschung und ihre Bedeutung für die griechische Textgeschichte, Wissenschaftliche Beirat des Instituts für neutestamentliche Textforschung, Berlin 1972.
- Carroll D. Osburn, The Greek Lectionaries of the New Testament, in. The Text of the New Testament in Contemporary Research, ed. Bart D. Ehrman and Michael W. Holmes, William B. Eerdmans Publishing Company, Grand Rapids 1995, pp. 61–74.
