= Jesus and the woman taken in adultery =

Passage from the Gospel of John

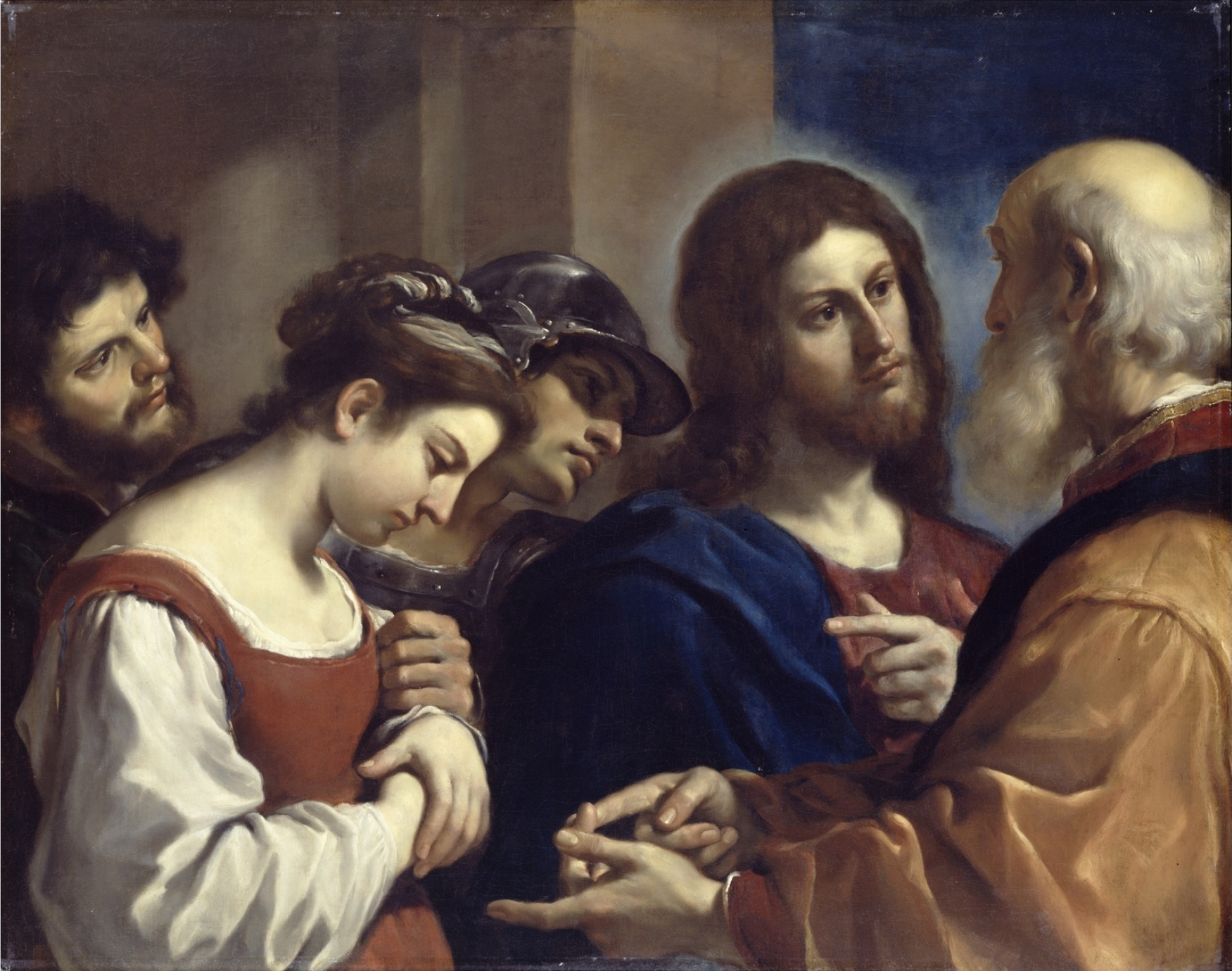
Christ with the Woman Taken in Adultery, by Guercino, 1621 (Dulwich Picture Gallery)

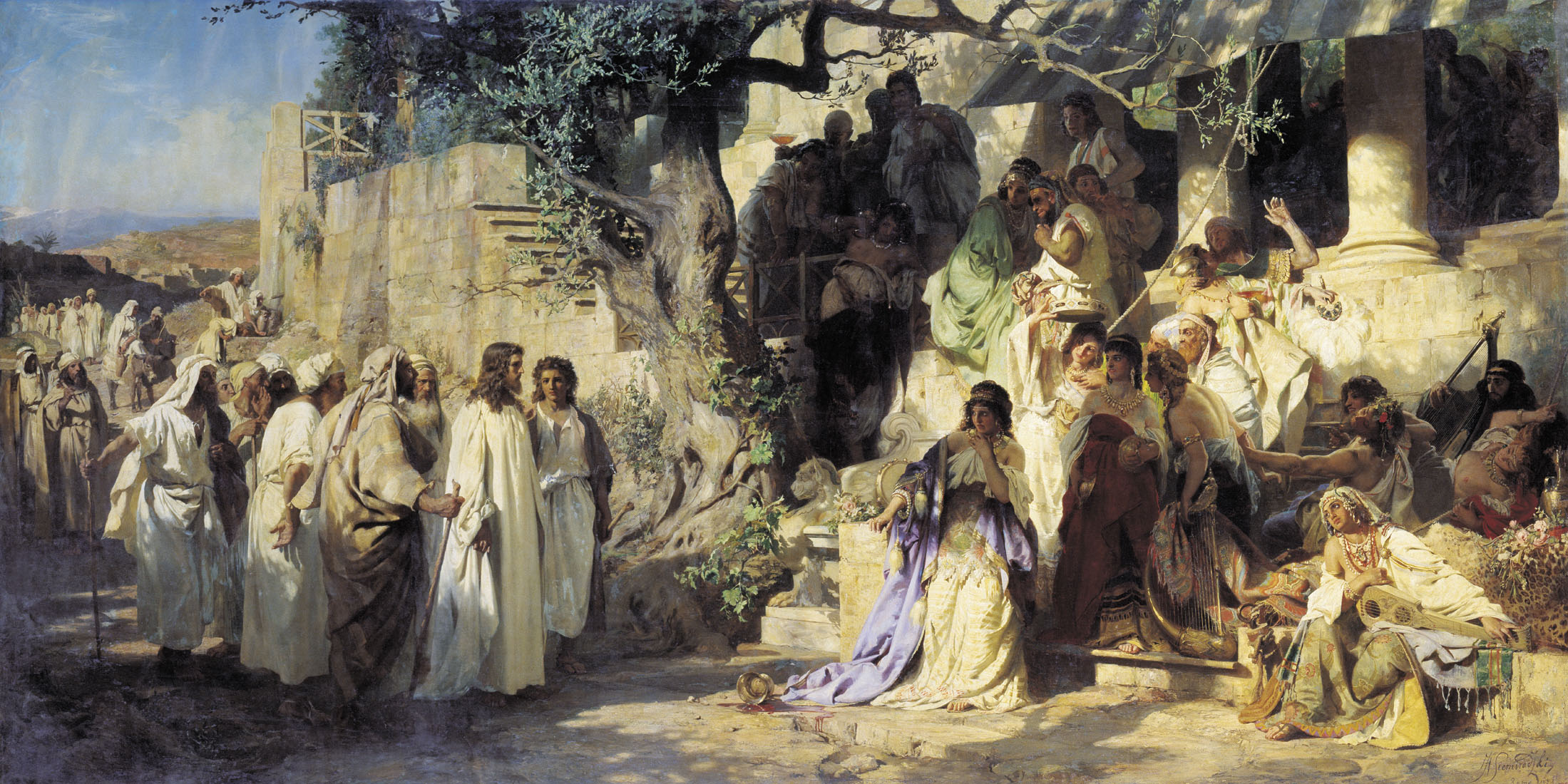
Christ and Sinner, 1873 by Henryk Siemiradzki

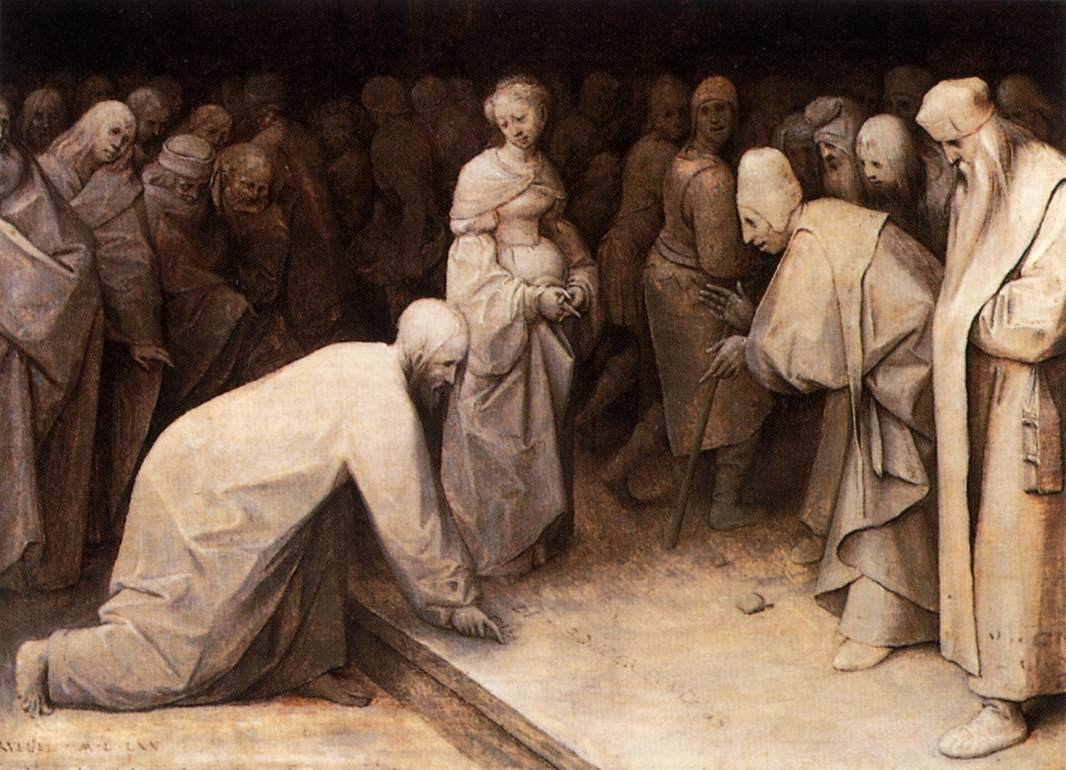
Christ and the Woman Taken in Adultery, 1565 by Pieter Bruegel, oil on panel, 24 cm × 34 cm (9.4 in × 13.4 in)

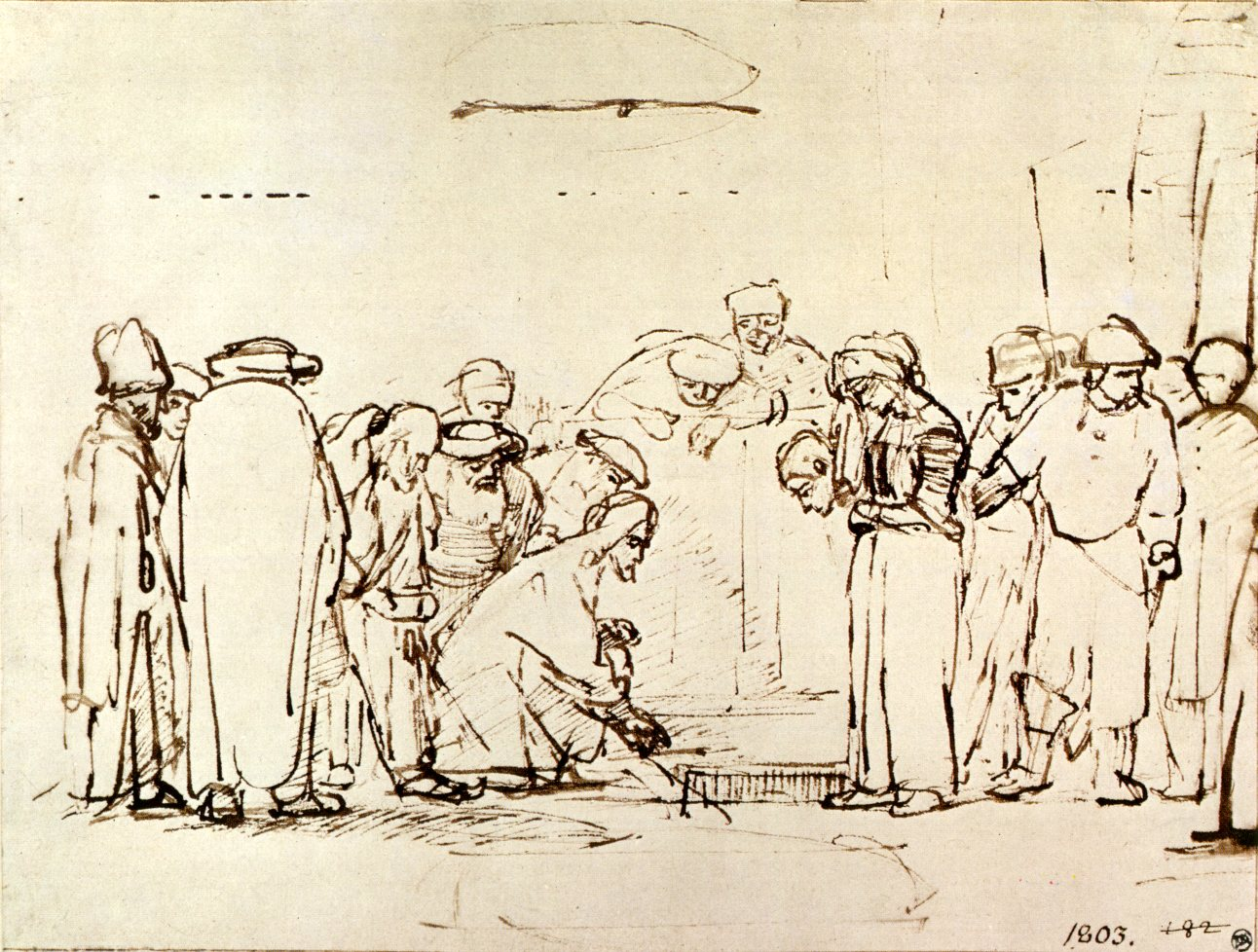
Christ and the woman taken in adultery, drawing by Rembrandt

Jesus and the woman taken in adultery (or the Pericope Adulterae) (Note: Pronunciation: /pəˈrɪkəpi əˈdʌltəri/ pə-RIK-ə-pee ə-DUL-tər-ee, Ecclesiastical Latin: [peˈrikope aˈdultere].) is a passage (pericope) found in John 7:53–8:11 of the New Testament.

In the passage, Jesus was teaching in the Second Temple after coming from the Mount of Olives. A group of scribes and Pharisees confronts Jesus, interrupting his teaching. They bring in a woman, accusing her of committing adultery, claiming she was caught in the very act. They tell Jesus that the punishment for someone like her should be stoning, as prescribed by Mosaic Law. Jesus begins to write something on the ground using his finger; when the woman's accusers continue their challenge, he states that the one who is without sin is the one who should cast the first stone at her. The accusers depart, realizing not one of them is without sin either, leaving Jesus alone with the woman. Jesus asks the woman whether anyone has condemned her, and she answers no. Jesus says that he too does not condemn her and tells her to go and sin no more.

There is now a broad academic consensus that the passage is a later interpolation added after the earliest known manuscripts of the Gospel of John. Nevertheless, many scholars "conclude that the story does record an actual event in the life of [Jesus]." Most scholars believe it was a well-known story circulating in the oral tradition about Jesus, which at some point was added in the margin of a manuscript. Although it is included in most modern translations (one notable exception being the New World Translation of the Holy Scriptures) it is typically noted as a later interpolation, as it is by Novum Testamentum Graece NA28. This has been the view of "most NT scholars, including most evangelical NT scholars, for well over a century" (written in 2009). However, its originality has been defended by a minority of scholars who believe in the Byzantine priority hypothesis. The passage appears to have been included in some texts by the 4th century and became generally accepted by the 5th century. It is likewise considered by many to be pseudepigraphical.

== The passage ==
John 7:53–8:11 in the New Revised Standard Version reads as follows:

Then each of them went home,^{8:1} while Jesus went to the Mount of Olives.^{2} Early in the morning he came again to the temple. All the people came to him and he sat down and began to teach them.^{3} The scribes and the Pharisees brought a woman who had been caught in adultery; and making her stand before all of them,^{4} they said to him, "Teacher, this woman was caught in the very act of committing adultery.^{5} Now in the law Moses commanded us to stone such women. Now what do you say?"^{6} They said this to test him, so that they might have some charge to bring against him. Jesus bent down and wrote with his finger on the ground. ^{7} When they kept on questioning him, he straightened up and said to them, "Let anyone among you who is without sin be the first to throw a stone at her."^{8} And once again he bent down and wrote on the ground.^{9} When they heard it, they went away, one by one, beginning with the elders; and Jesus was left alone with the woman standing before him.^{10} Jesus straightened up and said to her, "Woman, where are they? Has no one condemned you?"^{11} She said, "No one, sir." And Jesus said, "Neither do I condemn you. Go your way, and from now on do not sin again."

— John 7:53–8:11, NRSV

== Interpretation ==
This episode and its message of mercy and forgiveness balanced with a call to holy living have endured in Christian thought. Both "let him who is without sin cast the first stone" and "go, and sin no more" have found their way into common usage. The English idiomatic phrase to "cast the first stone" is derived from this passage.

The passage has been taken as confirmation of Jesus's ability to write, otherwise only suggested by implication in the Gospels, but the word ἔγραφεν (egraphen) in John 8:8 could mean "draw" as well as "write".

According to the Hebrew Bible (also known as The Old Testament), the punishment for adultery was the death penalty by stoning. However in this time period (1st century CE), only the Roman Government was lawfully allowed to impose the death penalty; thus the Rabbi's punishment for an adulteress was divorce and the forfeit of her marriage contract (known as a ketubah), and not the death penalty.

== History of textual criticism ==
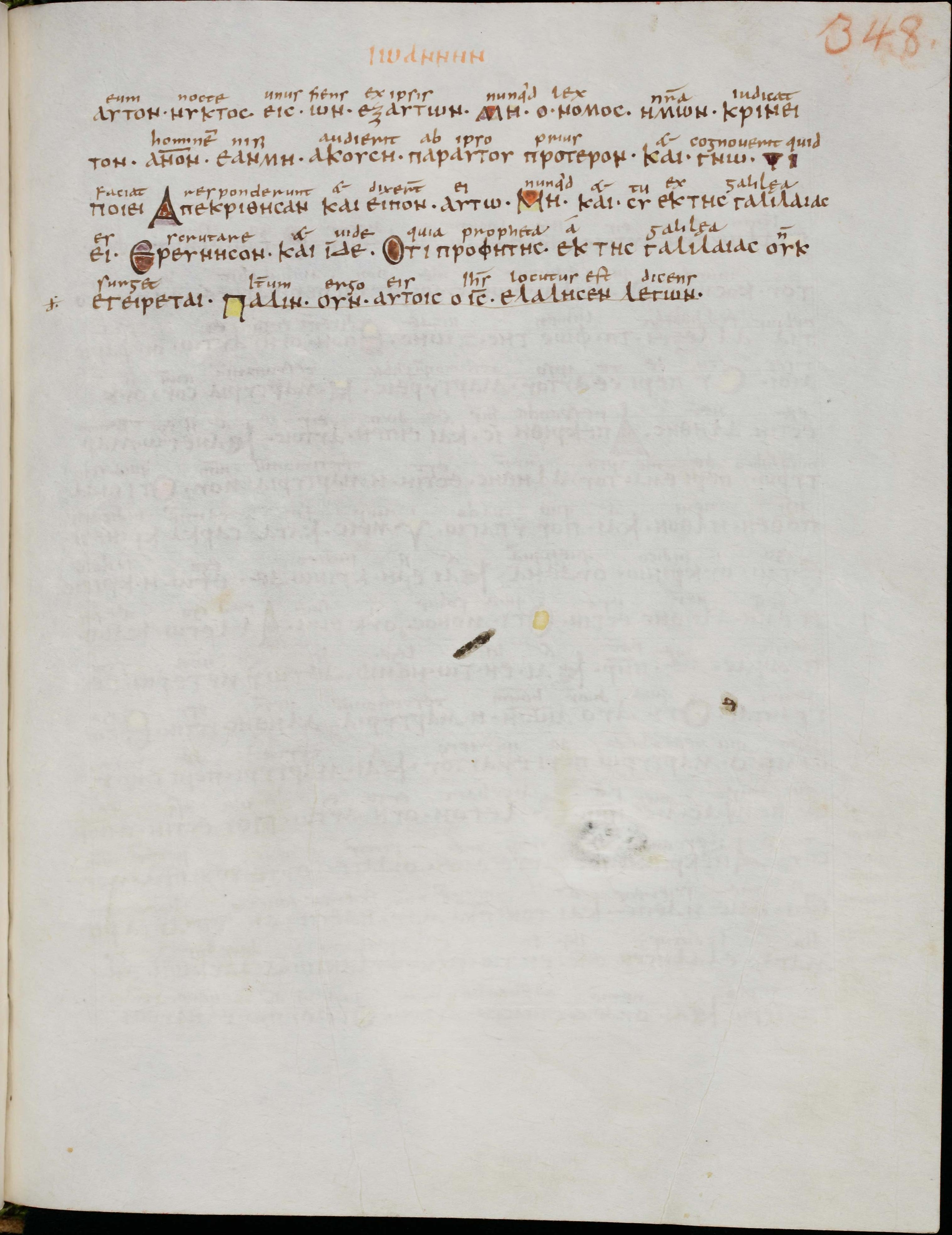
Codex Sangallensis 48 with the blanked space for the pericope John 7:53–8:11

The first to systematically apply the critical marks of the Alexandrian critics was Origen:

In the Septuagint column [Origen] used the system of diacritical marks which was in use with the Alexandrian critics of Homer, especially Aristarchus, marking with an obelus under different forms, as "./.", called lemniscus, and "/.", called a hypolemniscus, those passages of the Septuagint which had nothing to correspond to in Hebrew, and inserting, chiefly from Theodotion under an asterisk (*), those which were missing in the Septuagint; in both cases a metobelus (Y) marked the end of the notation.

Early textual critics familiar with the use and meaning of these marks in classical Greek works like Homer, interpreted the signs to mean that the section (John 7:53–8:11) was an interpolation and not an original part of the Gospel.

During the 16th century, Western European scholars – both Catholic and Protestant – sought to recover the most correct Greek text of the New Testament, rather than relying on the Vulgate Latin translation. At this time, it was noticed that a number of early manuscripts containing the Gospel of John lacked John 7:53–8:11 inclusive; and also that some manuscripts containing the verses marked them with critical signs, usually a lemniscus or asterisk. It was also noted that, in the lectionary of the Greek church, the Gospel-reading for Pentecost runs from John 7:37 to 8:12, but skips over the twelve verses of this pericope.

Beginning with Karl Lachmann (in Germany, 1840), reservations about the Pericope Adulterae became more strongly argued in the modern period, and these opinions were carried into the English world by Samuel Davidson (1848–51), Samuel Prideaux Tregelles (1862), and others; the argument against the verses being given body and final expression in F. J. A. Hort (1886). Those opposing the authenticity of the verses as part of John are represented in the 20th century by men like Henry Cadbury (1917), Ernest Cadman Colwell (1935), and Bruce M. Metzger (1971).

19th-century text critics Henry Alford and F. H. A. Scrivener suggested that the passage was added by John in a second edition of the Gospel along with 5:3.4 and the 21st chapter.

A number of scholars have strongly defended the Johannine authorship of these verses. This group of critics is typified by such scholars as Frederick Nolan (1865), and John Burgon (1886), and Herman C. Hoskier (1920). More recently it has been defended by David Otis Fuller (1975), and is included in the Greek New Testaments compiled by Wilbur Pickering (1980/2014), Hodges & Farstad (1982/1985), and Robinson & Pierpont (2005). Rather than endorsing Augustine's theory that some men had removed the passage due to a concern that it would be used by their wives as a pretext to commit adultery, Burgon proposed a theory that the passage had been lost due to a misunderstanding of a feature in the lection-system of the early church.

Almost all modern critical translations that include the pericope adulterae do so at John 7:53–8:11. Exceptions include the New English Bible and Revised English Bible, which relocate the pericope after the end of the Gospel. Most others enclose the pericope in brackets, or add a footnote mentioning the absence of the passage in the oldest witnesses (e.g., NRSV, NJB, NIV, GNT, NASB, ESV). Since the passage is accepted as canonical by Catholics, however, some Catholic editions of these critical translations will remove the brackets while retaining the footnote explanation of their uncertainty (e.g. RSV-CE/2CE and ESV-CE); others, like the NRSV-CE, nevertheless retain the brackets.

== Textual history ==
John 7:52–8:12 in Codex Vaticanus (c. 350 AD): lines 1 and 2 end 7:52; lines 3 and 4 start 8:12

The pericope does not occur in the Greek Gospel manuscripts from Egypt. The Pericope Adulterae is not in 𝔓^{66} or in 𝔓^{75}, both of which have been assigned to the late 100s or early 200s, nor in two important manuscripts produced in the early or mid 300s, Sinaiticus and Vaticanus. The first surviving Greek manuscript to contain the pericope is the Latin-Greek diglot Codex Bezae, produced in the 400s or 500s (but displaying a form of text which has affinities with "Western" readings used in the 100s and 200s). Codex Bezae is also the earliest surviving Latin manuscript to contain it. Out of 23 Old Latin manuscripts of John 7–8, seventeen contain at least part of the pericope, and represent at least three transmission-streams in which it was included.

=== Eastern Christianity ===
According to Eusebius of Caesarea (in his Ecclesiastical History, composed in the early 300s), Papias (c. AD 110) refers to a story of Jesus and a woman "accused of many sins" as being found in the Gospel of the Hebrews, which might refer to this passage or to one like it. However, according to the later writer Agapius of Hierapolis, Papias wrote a treatise on the Gospel of John, where he included the story within the Gospel itself. Possibly the earliest evidence for the existence of the pericope adulterae within the Gospel of John is from the 2nd century Protoevangelium of James, which contains the words "οὐδὲ ἐγὼ [κατα]κρίνω ὑμᾶς" (neither do I condemn you) in Greek, which are identical to the text of John 8:11. Other parallels between this story within Protoevangelium and the Johannine pericope adulterae include: (1) a woman is accused of adultery, (2) the accusation is made by the Jews, (3) the woman is brought by a crowd to stand before a religious figure, (4) the accused woman is presented to the judge for a ruling and (5) both accounts are a part of a "confrontation story". However, it is not certain if the author borrowed directly from the Gospel of John or from a now-unknown document such as the Gospel according to the Hebrews.

In the Syriac Didascalia Apostolorum, composed in the mid-200s, the author, in the course of instructing bishops to exercise a measure of clemency, states that a bishop who does not receive a repentant person would be doing wrong – "for you do not obey our Savior and our God, to do as He also did with her that had sinned, whom the elders set before Him, and leaving the judgment in His hands, departed. But He, the searcher of hearts, asked her and said to her, 'Have the elders condemned thee, my daughter?' She said to Him, 'No, Lord.' And He said unto her, 'Go your way; neither do I condemn thee.' In Him therefore, our Savior and King and God, be your pattern, O bishops." The Constitutions of the Holy Apostles Book II.24, composed c. 380, echoes the Didascalia Apostolorum, alongside a utilization of Luke 7:47. Further, Didymus the Blind (c. 313–398) states that "We find in certain gospels" an episode in which a woman was accused of a sin, and was about to be stoned, but Jesus intervened "and said to those who were about to cast stones, 'He who has not sinned, let him take a stone and throw it. If anyone is conscious in himself not to have sinned, let him take a stone and smite her.' And no one dared," and so forth. It is also shortly mentioned by the 6th century author of the Greek treatise "Synopsis Scripturae Sacrae". Among the early Greek attestations of the pericope adulterae are the 6th century canon tables found in the Monastery of Epiphanus in Egypt. Although fragmentary, the manuscript likely contained the story of the adulteress and contained its own section number. Evidence of its existence within some Egyptian manuscripts additionally comes from two ivory pyxides dated to around the 5th or 6th century, which depict the story of the adulteress.

Within the Syriac tradition, the anonymous author of the 6th century Syriac Chronicle, called Pseudo-Zacharias Rhetor mentioned the translation of the pericope Adulterae into Aramaic from a Greek manuscript from Alexandria. The story of the adulteress is also found in manuscripts of the Palestinian Syriac Lectionary, including MS "A" (1030ad), MS "C" (1118ad) and MS "B" (1104ad).

An author by the name of "Nicon" wrote a treatise called "On the Impious Religion of the Vile Armenians", in which he argued that the Armenian Christians tried to remove the passage from their manuscripts. This has been often attributed to the 10th century author Nicon, however Wescott and Hort argued that it is a later 13th century Nicon. They argued that this writing was made in response to the claims of Vardan Areveltsi, who stated that Papias is responsible for the inclusion of the story in the Gospel of John. Later on, in the 12th century the passage was mentioned by Euthymius Zigabenus, who doubted the authenticity of the passage. However, his contemporary Eustathios of Thessaloniki commented on the passage as an authentic part of John's Gospel.

=== Western Christianity ===
The story of the adulteress was quoted by multiple Latin speaking early Christians, and appears within their quotations of the New Testament often. It is quoted by church fathers such as Hilary of Poitiers, Gregory the Great, Leo the Great, Ambrose, Ambrosiaster and Augustine among many others. However, it is not quoted by either Tertullian or Cyprian, which might imply that it was missing from their manuscripts. The story is present in the vast majority of Vetus Latina manuscripts and in all except one manuscript of the Latin Vulgate.

Pacian of Barcelona (bishop from 365 to 391), in the course of making a rhetorical challenge, opposes cruelty as he sarcastically endorses it: "O Novatians, why do you delay to ask an eye for an eye? [...] Kill the thief. Stone the petulant. Choose not to read in the Gospel that the Lord spared even the adulteress who confessed, when none had condemned her." Pacian was a contemporary of the scribes who made Codex Sinaiticus.

The writer known as Ambrosiaster, c. 370/380, mentioned the occasion when Jesus "spared her who had been apprehended in adultery." The unknown author of the composition "Apologia David" (thought by some analysts to be Ambrose, but more probably not) mentioned that people could be initially taken aback by the passage in which "we see an adulteress presented to Christ and sent away without condemnation." Later in the same composition he referred to this episode as a "lection" in the Gospels, indicating that it was part of the annual cycle of readings used in the church-services.

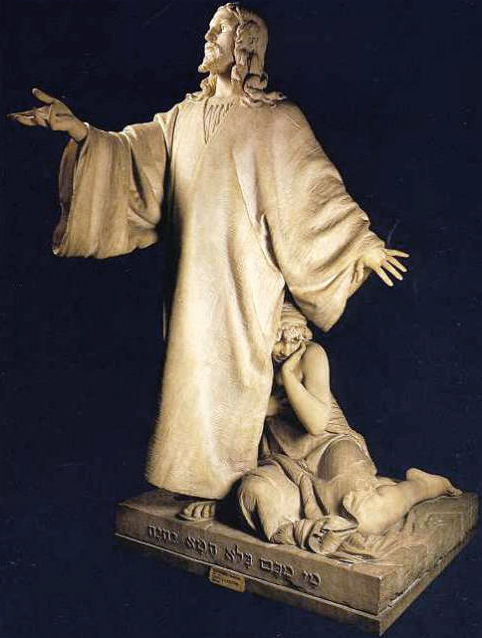
Rodolpho Bernardelli: Christ and the Adulterous Woman, 1881 (Museu Nacional de Belas Artes)

Peter Chrysologus, writing in Ravenna c. 450, clearly cited the Pericope Adulterae in his Sermon 115. Sedulius and Gelasius also clearly used the passage. Prosper of Aquitaine, and Quodvultdeus of Carthage, in the mid-400s, utilized the passage.

The Latin Vulgate Gospel of John, produced by Jerome in 383, was based on the Greek manuscripts which Jerome considered ancient exemplars at that time and which contained the passage. Jerome, writing around 417, reports that the Pericope Adulterae was found in its usual place in "many Greek and Latin manuscripts" in Rome and the Latin West. This is confirmed by some Latin Fathers of the 300s and 400s, including Ambrose of Milan, and Augustine of Hippo. The latter claimed that the passage may have been improperly excluded from some manuscripts in order to avoid the impression that Christ had sanctioned adultery:

Certain persons of little faith, or rather enemies of the true faith, fearing, I suppose, lest their wives should be given impunity in sinning, removed from their manuscripts the Lord's act of forgiveness toward the adulteress, as if he who had said, Sin no more, had granted permission to sin. (Note: Latin: "Sed hoc videlicet infidelium sensus exhorret, ita ut nonnulli modicae fidei vel potius inimici verae fidei, credo, metuentes peccandi impunitatem dari mulieribus suis, illud, quod de adulterae indulgentia Dominus fecit, auferrent de codicibus suis, quasi permissionem peccandi tribuerit qui dixit: Iam deinceps noli peccare, aut ideo non debuerit mulier a medico Deo illius peccati remissione sanari, ne offenderentur insani." Augustine, De Adulterinis Conjugiis 2:6–7.)

Codex Fuldensis, which was produced in AD 546, and which, in the Gospels, features an unusual arrangement of the text that was found in an earlier document, contains the adulterae pericope, in the form in which it was written in the Vulgate. More significantly, Codex Fuldensis also preserves the chapter-headings of its earlier source-document (thought by some researchers to echo the Diatessaron produced by Tatian in the 170's), and the title of chapter 120 refers specifically to the woman taken in adultery.

The subject of Jesus's writing on the ground was fairly common in art, especially from the Renaissance onwards, with examples by artists including a painting by Pieter Bruegel and a drawing by Rembrandt. There was a medieval tradition, originating in a comment attributed to Ambrose, that the words written were terra terram accusat ("earth accuses earth"; a reference to the end of verse Genesis 3:19: "for dust you are and to dust you will return"), (Note: This phrase, "terra terram accusat", is also given in the Gospel Book of Hitda of Maschede and a ninth-century glossa, Codex Sangelensis 292, and a sermon by Jacobus de Voragine attributes the use of these words to Ambrose and Augustine, and other phrases to the Glossa Ordinaria and John Chrysostom, who is usually considered as not referencing the Pericope.) which is shown in some depictions in art, for example, the Codex Egberti.

== Manuscripts ==
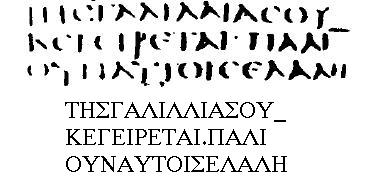
John 7:52–8:12 in Codex Sinaiticus

Both the Novum Testamentum Graece (NA28) and the United Bible Societies (UBS4) provide critical text for the pericope, but mark this off with double square brackets, indicating that the Pericope Adulterae is regarded as a later addition to the text.

Various manuscripts treat, or include, the passage in a variety of ways. These can be categorised into those that exclude it entirely, those that exclude only a shortened version of the passage (including 7:53-8:2 but excluding 8:3-11), those that include only a shortened version of the passage (8:3–11), those that include the passage in full, those that question the passage, those that question only the shorter passage, those that relocate it to a different place within the Gospel of John, and those that mark it as having been added by a later hand.

1. Exclude the passage: Papyri 𝔓^{66} (c. 200 or 4th century) and 𝔓^{75} (early 3rd century or 4th century); Codices Sinaiticus (א) and Vaticanus (Β) (4th century), although Vaticanus includes umlauts at the end of 7:52, which some have argued to imply knowledge of the variant. Other manuscripts to lack it apparently include Alexandrinus (A) and Ephraemi (C) (5th), Codices Washingtonianus (W) and Borgianus (T) also from the 5th century, Athous Lavrensis (Ψ) (c. 800), Petropolitanus Purpureus (N), Macedoniensis (Y), and Koridethi (Θ) from the 9th century and Monacensis (X) from the 10th; Uncials 0141 and 0211; Minuscules 3, 12, 15, 19, 21, 22, 31, 32, 33, 34, 36, 39, 44, 49, 63, 72, 77, 87, 96, 106, 108, 123, 124, 131, 134, 139, 151, 154, 157, 168, 169, 209, 213, 228, 249, 261, 269, 297, 303, 306, 315, 316, 317, 318, 333, 370, 388, 391, 392, 397, 401, 416, 423, 428, 430, 431, 445, 496, 499, 501, 523, 537, 542, 554, 565, 578, 584, 649, 684, 703, 713, 719, 723, 727, 729, 730, 731, 732, 733, 734, 736, 740, 741, 742, 743, 744, 749, 768, 770, 772, 773, 776, 777, 780, 794, 799, 800, 817, 818, 819, 820, 821, 827, 828, 831, 833, 834, 835, 836, 841, 843, 849, 850, 854, 855, 857, 862, 863, 865, 869, 896, 989, 1077, 1080, 1141 1178, 1230, 1241, 1242, 1253, 1256, 1261, 1262, 1326, 1333, 1357, 1593, 2106, 2193, 2244, 2768, 2862, 2900, 2901, 2907, 2957, 2965 and 2985; the majority of lectionaries; the Old Latin manuscripts Codex Vercellensis (a, VL3; 4th cent CE), Codex Brixianus (f, VL10; 6th cent. CE), Codex Monacensis (q, VL13; 6/7th cent CE), the majority of the Syriac, the Sahidic dialect of the Coptic, the Garima Gospels and other Ethiopic witnesses, the Gothic, some Armenian, Georgian mss. of Adysh (9th century); Arabic mss of Diatessaron (2nd century); apparently Clement of Alexandria (died 215), other Church Fathers namely Tertullian (died 220), Origen (died 254), Cyprian (died 258), John Chrysostom (died 407), Nonnus (died 431), Cyril of Alexandria (died 444), Cosmas (died 550) and later Christians such as Vardan Araveltsi (13th century).
2. Shorter passage excluded (includes 7:53-8:2 but excludes 8:3-11): 228, 759, 1458, 1663, and 2533.
3. Shorter passage included (8:3–11): ℓ 4, ℓ 67, ℓ 69, ℓ 70, ℓ 71, ℓ 75, ℓ 81, ℓ 89, ℓ 90, ℓ 98, ℓ 101, ℓ 107, ℓ 125, ℓ 126, ℓ 139, ℓ 146, ℓ 185, ℓ 211, ℓ 217, ℓ 229, ℓ 267, ℓ 280, ℓ 282, ℓ 287, ℓ 376, ℓ 381, ℓ 386, ℓ 390, ℓ 396, ℓ 398, ℓ 402, ℓ 405, ℓ 409, ℓ 417, ℓ 422, ℓ 430, ℓ 431, ℓ 435 (8:2–11), ℓ 462, ℓ 464, ℓ 465, ℓ 520 (8:2–11).
4. Include passage: the Latin Vulgate (4th century), Codex Bezae (D) (5th century), Uncial 047 (8th century), Uncial 0233 (8th century), 9th century Codices Boreelianus (F), Seidelianus I (G), Seidelianus II (H), Cyprius (K), Campianus (M), Nanianus (U), also Tischendorfianus IV (Γ) from the 10th, Codex Petropolitanus (Π); Minuscule 28, 318, 700, 892, 1009, 1010, 1071, 1079, 1195, 1216, 1344, 1365, 1546, 1646, 2148, 2174; the Byzantine majority text (around 1350 manuscripts); ℓ 79, ℓ 100 (John 8:1–11), ℓ 118, ℓ 130 (8:1–11), ℓ 221, ℓ 274, ℓ 281, ℓ 411, ℓ 421, ℓ 429 (8:1–11), ℓ 442 (8:1–11), ℓ 445 (8:1–11), ℓ 459; the majority of the Old Latin: Codex Palatinus (5th century), Codex Corbeiensis (5th century), Codex Veronesis (5th century), Codex Sarzanensis (5th century), Codex Usserianus Primus (7th century), Book of Mulling (8th century), Codex Sangermanensis secundus (10th century), Codex Colbertinus (12th century), Western witnesses to the Diatessaron (Codex Fuldensis, Liège Harmony, Codex Sangallensis 56), the Greek canon tables of the Monastery of Saint Epiphanius (6th century), Palestinian Syriac lectionaries, some of the Coptic such as Codex Marshall Or. 5 (14th century) also depicted by early Coptic ivory pyxides (5th-6th century), some Armenian (Echmiadzin Gospels), possibly alluded to by the Protoevangelium of James (2nd century), explicitly mentioned by the Didascalia (3rd century), Didymus the Blind (4th century), Hilary of Poitiers (4th century), Apostolic Constitutions (4th century) Ambrosiaster (4th century), Pacian (4th century), Rufinus of Aquileia (4th century), Ambrose (died 397), Jerome (died 420), Augustine (died 430), Peter Chrysologus (5th century), Quodvultdeus of Carthage (5th century), Prosper of Aquitane (5th century), Leo the Great (5th century), Sedulius (5th century), Gelasius (5th century), Pseudo-Athanasius (6th century), Cassiodorus (6th century), Gregory the Great (6th century), Pseudo-Zacharias Rhetor (6th century), Agapius of Hierapolis (10th century), Nicon (10th century), Dionysius bar Salibi (12th century) and Eustathius of Thessalonica (12th century).
5. Question pericope (marked with asterisks (※), obeli (÷), dash (–) or (<)): Codex Vaticanus 354 (S) and the Minuscules 18, 24, 35, 045, 83, 95 (questionable scholion), 109, 125, 141, 148, 156, 161, 164, 165, 166, 167, 178, 179, 200, 201, 202, 285, 338, 348, 363, 367, 376, 386, 392, 407, 478, 479, 510, 532, 547, 553, 645, 655, 656, 661, 662, 685, 699, 757, 758, 763, 769, 781, 789, 797, 801, 824, 825, 829, 844, 845, 867, 897, 922, 1073, 1092 (later hand), 1187, 1189, 1280, 1443, 1445, 2099, and 2253 include entire pericope from 7:53; the menologion of Lectionary 185 includes 8:1ff; Codex Basilensis (E) includes 8:2ff; Codex Tischendorfianus III (Λ) and Petropolitanus (П) also the menologia of Lectionaries ℓ 86, ℓ 211, ℓ 1579 and ℓ 1761 include 8:3ff. Minuscule 807 is a manuscript with a Catena, but only in John 7:53–8:11 without catena. It is a characteristic of late Byzantine manuscripts conforming to the sub-type Family K^{r}, that this pericope is marked with obeli; although Maurice Robinson argues that these marks are intended to remind lectors that these verses are to be omitted from the Gospel lection for Pentecost, not to question the authenticity of the passage. The originality of the story was questioned by Euthymius Zigabenus (12th century).
6. Shorter passage questioned (8:3–11, marked with asterisks (※), obeli (÷) or (<)): 4, 8, 14, 443, 689, 707, 781, 873, 1517. (8:2-11) Codex Basilensis A. N. III. 12 (E) (8th century),
7. Relocate passage: Family 1, minuscules 20, 37, 135, 207, 301, 347, and nearly all Armenian translations place the pericope after John 21:25; Family 13 place it after Luke 21:38; a corrector to Minuscule 1333 added 8:3–11 after Luke 24:53; and Minuscule 225 includes the pericope after John 7:36. Minuscule 129, 135, 259, 470, 564, 1076, 1078, and 1356 place John 8:3–11 after John 21:25. Minuscules 115, 552, 1349, and 2620 place the pericope after John 8:12.
8. Added by a later hand: Codex Ebnerianus (Min. 105), Codex Rehdigeranus (l, VL11), 19, 284, 431, 391, 461, 470, 501 (8:3-11), 578, 794, 1141, 1357, 1593, 2174, 2244, 2860, MS 14470 (added in the 9th century by a later scribe).
9. Lacuna: Codex Regius (L) (8th century) and Codex Sangallensis (Δ) (9th century) contain a large gap after John 7:52, thus indicating possible knowledge of the passage despite being omitted.

The Pericope Adulterae was never read as a part of the lesson for the Pentecost cycle, but John 8:3–8:11 was reserved for the festivals of such saints as Theodora, 18 September, or Pelagia, 8 October.

== Authorship ==
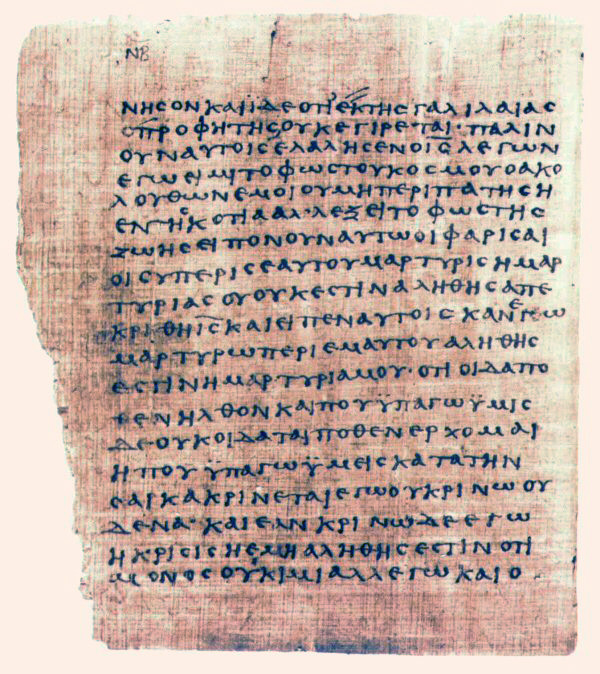
Papyrus 66 without text of John 7:53–8:12

=== Arguments against Johannine authorship ===
Bishop J. B. Lightfoot wrote that absence of the passage from the earliest manuscripts, combined with the occurrence of stylistic characteristics atypical of John, together implied that the passage was an interpolation. Nevertheless, he considered the story to be authentic history. As a result, based on Eusebius' mention that the writings of Papias contained a story "about a woman falsely accused before the Lord of many sins" (H.E. 3.39), he argued that this section originally was part of Papias' Interpretations of the Sayings of the Lord, and included it in his collection of Papias' fragments. German theologian Walter Klaiber also supports the claim that the passage records an actual event, consistent with Jesus' teachings. Other scholars who support the story's historicity include George Beasley-Murray, B. F. Westcott, Carl B. Bridge, Bruce M. Metzger, and Gary Burge. Giuseppe Segalla claims that "as to historicity, it is generally positive because the episode is perfectly consistent with the forgiveness of Jesus as it appears in the Synoptic Gospels: in fact, this story has the characteristics of the Synoptic tradition". Bart D. Ehrman concurs in Misquoting Jesus, adding that the passage contains many words and phrases otherwise alien to John's writing. The evangelical Bible scholar Daniel B. Wallace agrees with Ehrman. Nevertheless, Wallace believes that it is based on a real event.

There are several excerpts from other authors that are consistent with this:

Fragment 1 (Eusebius – 4th century):

And he relates another story of a woman, who was accused of many sins before the Lord, which is contained in the Gospel according to the Hebrews. These things we have thought it necessary to observe in addition to what has been already stated.

Fragment 2 (Agapius of Hierapolis – 10th century):

And there was at that time in Menbij [Hierapolis] a distinguished master who had many treatises, and he wrote five treatises on the Gospel. And he mentions in his treatise on the Gospel of John, that in the book of John the Evangelist, he speaks of a woman who was adulterous, so when they presented her to Christ our Lord, to whom be glory, He told the Jews who brought her to Him, "Whoever of you knows that he is innocent of what she has done, let him testify against her with what he has." So when He told them that, none of them responded with anything and they left.

Fragment 3 (Vardan Areveltsi – 13th century):

The story of that adulterous woman, which other Christians have written in their gospel, was written about by a certain Papias, a student of John, who was declared a heretic and condemned. Eusebius wrote about this. There are laws and that matter which Pilate, the king of the Jews, wrote of. And it is said that he wrote in Hebrew with Latin and Greek above it.

However, Michael W. Holmes says that it is not certain "that Papias knew the story in precisely this form, inasmuch as it now appears that at least two independent stories about Jesus and a sinful woman circulated among Christians in the first two centuries of the church, so that the traditional form found in many New Testament manuscripts may well represent a conflation of two independent shorter, earlier versions of the incident." Kyle R. Hughes has argued that one of these earlier versions is in fact very similar in style, form, and content to the Lukan special material (the so-called "L" source), suggesting that the core of this tradition is in fact rooted in very early Christian (though not Johannine) memory. Klaiber also argues that the story "is very ancient and was already known at the beginning of the 2nd century."

=== Arguments for Johannine authorship ===
The story of the adulteress has been defended by those who teach the Byzantine priority theory and also by those who defend the superiority of the Textus Receptus. Among these, Zane C. Hodges and Arthur L. Farstad argue for Johannine authorship of the pericope. They suggest there are points of similarity between the pericope's style and the style of the rest of the gospel. They claim that the details of the encounter fit very well into the context of the surrounding verses. They argue that the pericope's appearance in the majority of manuscripts, if not in the oldest ones, is evidence of its authenticity. Biblical scholar Maurice Robinson argued that the anomalies in the transmission of the Pericope Adulterae may be explained by the Lectionary system, where due to the Pericope Adulterae being skipped during the Pentecost lesson, some scribes would relocate the story to not intervene with the flow of the Pentecost lesson. He also argued that mistakes arising from the Lectionary system are able to explain the omission of the story in some manuscripts.

== Status in the Bible ==
According to Armin Baum, "the question of the Pericope Adulterae's canonicity does not follow automatically from a literary historical judgment about its origin." The Catholic Church regards it as canonical, following the precepts of the Council of Trent. Many Protestants reject it as non-canonical. From a Protestant point of view, Baum argues that its canonicity can be "determined according to the same historical and content-related criteria that the ancient church applied during the development of the canon of Scriptures." He further argues, however, that it should be separated from the Gospel of John.

== Art and culture ==
The story is the subject of several paintings, including:

- Christ and the Woman Taken in Adultery, a series of works by Lucas Cranach the Elder and the Younger (1520-1560)
- Christ and the Woman Taken in Adultery by Pieter Bruegel the Elder (1565)
- Christ and the Woman Taken in Adultery by Peter Paul Rubens (1614)
- The Woman Taken in Adultery by Rembrandt (1644)
- Christ and the Woman Taken in Adultery by Mattia Preti (c. 1650)
- Christ and the Woman Taken in Adultery (He That Is Without Sin?) by Vasily Polenov (1888)
- Christ and the Woman Taken in Adultery by Max Beckmann (1917)
- Christ with the Adulteress by Han van Meegeren (1942), but sold as an original Vermeer

Variations of the story are told in the 1986 science fiction novel Speaker for the Dead by Orson Scott Card, as part of Letters to an Incipient Heretic by the character San Angelo.

=== Incident of Chinese textbook distortion ===
In September 2020, the Chinese textbook《职业道德与法律》(Professional Ethics and Law) was alleged to inaccurately recount the story with a changed narrative in which Jesus stones the woman, while stating "I too am a sinner. But if the law could only be executed by men without blemish, the law would be dead." The publisher claims that this was an inauthentic, unauthorized publication of its textbook.

== See also ==
- List of New Testament verses not included in modern English translations
- Parable of the Good Samaritan
