= Minuscule 741 =

- New Testament manuscript
- Text: Gospels
- Date: 14th century
- Script: Greek
- Now at: Bibliothèque nationale de France
- Size: 24.5 cm by 16.6 cm
- Type: Byzantine text-type
- Category: V
- Note: –

Minuscule 741 (in the Gregory-Aland numbering), Θ^{ε417} (von Soden), is a Greek minuscule manuscript of the New Testament written on paper. Palaeographically it has been assigned to the 14th century. The manuscript has complex contents. Scrivener labelled it as 762^{e}.

== Description ==
The codex contains the text of the Gospel of Luke, on 362 paper leaves (size 24.5 cm by 16.6 cm). The text is written in one column per page, 42-51 lines per page.

The manuscript was written by several hands. It has a commentary of Theophylact. It contains τιτλοι (titles) at the top of the pages.

It contains lectionary markings at the margin, for liturgical reading.

== Text ==
The Greek text of the codex is a representative of the Byzantine text-type. Aland placed it in Category V. It was not examined by using the Claremont Profile Method.

It lacks the text of the Pericope Adulterae (John 7:53-8:11).

== History ==
Scrivener and Gregory dated the manuscript to the 14th century. The manuscript is currently dated by the INTF to the 14th century.

The manuscript was added to the list of New Testament manuscripts by Scrivener (762) and Gregory (741). It was examined and described by Paulin Martin. Gregory saw the manuscript in 1885.

The manuscript is now housed at the Bibliothèque nationale de France (Gr. 235) in Paris.

== See also ==
- List of New Testament minuscules
- Biblical manuscript
- Textual criticism
- Minuscule 742
