= Minuscule 744 =

- New Testament manuscript
- Text: Gospels †
- Date: 13th century
- Script: Greek
- Now at: Bibliothèque nationale de France
- Size: 28.8 cm by 21 cm
- Type: ?
- Category: none
- Note: commentary

Minuscule 744 (in the Gregory-Aland numbering), Θ^{ε22} (von Soden), is a Greek minuscule manuscript of the New Testament written on parchment. Palaeographically it has been assigned to the 13th century. The manuscript has no complex contents. Scrivener labelled it as 759^{e}.

== Description ==
The codex contains the four Gospels on 367 parchment leaves (size 28.8 cm by 21 cm), with one lacuna. Matthew 1:1-3:6 was added later.

The text is written in one 27-line column per page.

It contains tables of the κεφαλαια to Matthew (added later), the τιτλοι (titles) in Matthew, and portrait of Evangelist Luke.

It has a commentary of Theophylact.

== Text ==
Kurt Aland did not place the Greek text of the codex in any Category.

It was not examined by using the Claremont Profile Method.

== History ==
Bernard de Montfaucon and Henri Omont dated the manuscript to the 11th century; Scrivener dated the manuscript to the 15th or 16th century; Gregory dated it to the 13th century. The manuscript is currently dated by the INTF to the 13th century.

The manuscript once belonged to the monastery of the St. Justina in Padua (as Minuscule 367).

The manuscript was examined by Bernard de Montfaucon, Paulin Martin, and Henri Omont.

It joined the list of New Testament manuscripts by Scrivener (759) and Gregory (744). Gregory saw the manuscript in 1885.

The manuscript is now at the Bibliothèque nationale de France (Supplément Gr. 219) in Paris.

== See also ==
- List of New Testament minuscules
- Biblical manuscript
- Textual criticism
- Minuscule 743
