= Lectionary 79 =

Lectionary ℓ 79
- New Testament manuscript
- Text: Evangelistarion
- Date: 14th-century
- Script: Greek
- Now at: Bibliothèque nationale de France
- Size: 32.1 cm by 25 cm

Lectionary 79, designated by siglum ℓ 79 (in the Gregory-Aland numbering), is a Greek manuscript of the New Testament, on vellum leaves. Palaeographically it has been assigned to the 14th-century. According to Scrivener it was written in the 12th-century.

== Description ==
The codex contains lessons from the Gospels of John, Matthew, Luke lectionary (Evangelistarium) with lacunae. Three first lessons at the beginning and end were lost. It is written in Greek minuscule letters, on 120 parchment leaves (32.1 cm by 25 cm). The writing stands in 2 columns per page, 26 lines per page. It contains the Pericope Adulterae (John 7:53-8:11).

== History ==
The manuscript was partially examined by Scholz and Paulin Martin. C. R. Gregory saw it in 1885.

The manuscript is not cited in the critical editions of the Greek New Testament (UBS3).

Currently the codex is located in the Bibliothèque nationale de France (Gr. 299) in Paris.

== See also ==
- List of New Testament lectionaries
- Biblical manuscript
- Textual criticism
