= Minuscule 742 =

- New Testament manuscript
- Text: Gospel of John
- Date: 15th century
- Script: Greek
- Now at: Bibliothèque nationale de France
- Size: 21.9 cm by 15 cm
- Type: ?
- Category: none
- Note: commentary

Minuscule 742 (in the Gregory-Aland numbering), Θ^{ε414} (von Soden), is a Greek minuscule manuscript of the New Testament written on paper. Palaeographically it has been assigned to the 15th century. The manuscript has no complex contents. Scrivener labelled it as 764^{e}.

== Description ==
The codex contains the text of the Gospel of John on 160 paper leaves (size 21.9 cm by 15 cm), with one lacuna (John 21:22-25).

The text is written in one column per page, 26-28 lines per page.

It has a commentary of Theophylact.

== Text ==
Aland the Greek text of the codex did not place in any Category.

It was not examined by using the Claremont Profile Method.

It lacks the text of the Pericope Adulterae (John 7:53-8:11).

== History ==
Scrivener dated the manuscript to the 15th or 16th century; Gregory dated it to the 15th century. The manuscript is currently dated by the INTF to the 15th century.

The manuscript was added to the list of New Testament manuscripts by Scrivener (764) and Gregory (742). It was examined and described by Paulin Martin. Gregory saw the manuscript in 1885.

The manuscript is now housed at the Bibliothèque nationale de France (Gr. 1775) in Paris.

== See also ==
- List of New Testament minuscules
- Biblical manuscript
- Textual criticism
- Minuscule 743
