= Minuscule 731 =

- New Testament manuscript
- Text: Gospels †
- Date: 14th century
- Script: Greek
- Now at: Bibliothèque nationale de France
- Size: 24 cm by 12.5 cm
- Type: Byzantine text-type
- Category: V
- Note: –

Minuscule 731 (in the Gregory-Aland numbering), Θ^{ε415} (von Soden), is a Greek minuscule manuscript of the New Testament written on paper. Palaeographically it has been assigned to the 14th century. The manuscript has no complex contents. Scrivener labelled it as 749^{e}.

== Description ==
The codex contains the text of the four Gospels on 426 paper leaves (size 24 cm by 12.5 cm), with some lacunae (Matthew 2:14-6:25). The texts of Matthew 1:1-2:13 and John 7:40-21:25 were supplied by a later hand.

The text is written in one column per page, 37 lines per page.

The text is divided according to the κεφαλαια (chapters), whose numbers are given at the margin, and their τιτλοι (titles of chapters) at the top. There is also another division according to the smaller Ammonian Sections, but there are no references to the Eusebian Canons.

It contains Prolegomena, lists of the κεφαλαια (tables of contents) before each Gospel, lectionary markings at the margin (for liturgical use), αναγνωσεις (lessons), subscriptions at the end of each Gospel, and pictures (crude). It has a commentary of Theophylact.

== Text ==
The Greek text of the codex is a representative of the Byzantine text-type. Aland placed it in Category V.

It was not examined by using the Claremont Profile Method.

It lacks the Pericope Adulterae (John 7:53-8:11).

== History ==
Scrivener dated the manuscript to the 14th century, Gregory dated it to the 14th or 15th century. The manuscript is currently dated by the INTF to the 14th century.

The manuscript was added to the list of New Testament manuscripts by Scrivener (749) and Gregory (731). It was examined and described by Paulin Martin. Gregory saw the manuscript in 1885.

The manuscript is now housed at the Bibliothèque nationale de France (Gr. 184) in Paris.

== See also ==
- List of New Testament minuscules
- Biblical manuscript
- Textual criticism
