= Minuscule 801 =

- New Testament manuscript
- Text: Gospels, Acts, Paul
- Date: 15th century
- Script: Greek
- Now at: National Library of Greece
- Size: 21 cm by 14.5 cm
- Type: Byzantine text-type
- Category: V
- Note: –

Minuscule 801 (in the Gregory-Aland numbering), δ553 (von Soden), is a Greek minuscule manuscript of the New Testament written on paper. Palaeographically it has been assigned to the 15th century. The manuscript has complex contents.

== Description ==
The codex contains the text of the four Gospels, Acts of the Apostles and Pauline epistles, on 324 paper leaves (size 21 cm by 14.5 cm). Folios 324-327 were supplied by a later hand. The text is written in one column per page, 26-29 lines per page.

It contains Prolegomena, lists of the κεφαλαια (chapters) before each sacred book (with a Harmony), lectionary markings at the margin, incipits, αναγνωσεις (lessons), subscriptions at the end each book, numbers of στιχοι, and Euthalian Apparatus. Subscriptions were added by a later hand.

The order of books is unusual: Book of Acts, Catholic epistles, Pauline epistles, and Gospels. A similar order appears in 393, 592.

== Text ==
The Greek text of the codex is a representative of the Byzantine text-type. Hermann von Soden classified it to the textual family K^{x}. Aland placed it in Category V.

According to the Claremont Profile Method it has mixed Byzantine text in Luke 1 and represent the textual family K^{x} in Luke 10 and Luke 20. It belongs to the textual subgroup 35.

The Pericope Adulterae (John 7:53-8:11) is marked by an obelus.

== History ==
According to Gregory the manuscript was written in the 15th century. The manuscript is currently dated by the INTF to the 15th century.

It was added to the list of New Testament manuscripts by Gregory (801^{e}, 264^{a}, 313^{p}). Gregory saw the manuscript in 1886.

The manuscript is now housed at the National Library of Greece (130) in Athens.

== See also ==
- List of New Testament minuscules
- Biblical manuscript
- Textual criticism
- Minuscule 800
