= Lectionary 75 =

Lectionary ℓ 75
- New Testament manuscript
- Text: Evangelistarion
- Date: 12th-century
- Script: Greek
- Now at: Bibliothèque nationale de France
- Size: 28 cm by 22.7 cm

Lectionary 75, designated by siglum ℓ 75 (in the Gregory-Aland numbering), is a Greek manuscript of the New Testament, on vellum leaves. Palaeographically it has been assigned to the year 12th-century.

== Description ==
The codex contains lessons from the Gospels of John, Matthew, Luke lectionary (Evangelistarium). It is written in Greek minuscule letters, on 250 parchment leaves (28 cm by 22.7 cm), in 2 columns per page, 29 lines per page.

It contains text of John 8:3-11.

== History ==
The manuscript was brought from the East to Paris.

It was partially examined by Scholz and Paulin Martin. C. R. Gregory saw it in 1885.

The manuscript is not cited in the critical editions of the Greek New Testament (UBS3).

Currently the codex is located in the Bibliothèque nationale de France (Gr. 293) in Paris.

== See also ==
- List of New Testament lectionaries
- Biblical manuscript
- Textual criticism
