= Minuscule 730 =

- New Testament manuscript
- Text: Gospels †
- Date: 14th century
- Script: Greek
- Now at: Bibliothèque nationale de France
- Size: 25.1 cm by 16.6 cm
- Type: Byzantine text-type
- Category: V
- Note: –

Minuscule 730 (in the Gregory-Aland numbering), Z^{ε32} (von Soden), is a Greek minuscule manuscript of the New Testament written on paper. Palaeographically it has been assigned to the 14th century. The manuscript has no complex contents. Scrivener labelled it as 748^{e}.

== Description ==
The codex contains the text of the four Gospels on 331 paper leaves (size 25.1 cm by 16.6 cm), with only one lacuna (John 21:3-25).

The text is written in one column per page, 32 lines per page.

The text is divided according to the κεφαλαια (chapters), whose numbers are given at the margin, with their τιτλοι (titles) at the top of the pages. There is no another division according to the smaller Ammonian Sections (with references to the Eusebian Canons).

It contains Prolegomena and tables of the κεφαλαια (tables of contents) before each Gospel. It has a commentary of Zigabenus.

== Text ==
The Greek text of the codex is a representative of the Byzantine text-type. Aland placed it in Category V.

It was not examined by using the Claremont Profile Method.

It lacks the Pericope Adulterae (John 7:53-8:11).

== History ==
Scrivener and Gregory dated the manuscript to the 14th century. The manuscript is currently dated by the INTF to the 14th century.

The manuscript was added to the list of New Testament manuscripts by Scrivener (748) and Gregory (730). It was examined and described by Paulin Martin. Gregory saw the manuscript in 1885.

The manuscript is now housed at the Bibliothèque nationale de France (Gr. 183) in Paris.

== See also ==
- List of New Testament minuscules
- Biblical manuscript
- Textual criticism
