= Lectionary 282 =

Lectionary ℓ 282
- New Testament manuscript
- Text: Evangelistarium
- Date: 14th century
- Script: Greek
- Now at: Biblioteca Palatina, Parma
- Size: 29 cm by 24 cm
- Type: Byzantine text-type

Lectionary 282, designated by siglum ℓ 282 (in the Gregory-Aland numbering) is a Greek manuscript of the New Testament, on parchment. Palaeographically it has been assigned to the 14th century. Scrivener labelled it as 161^{e}.

The manuscript has no complex contents.

== Description ==
The codex contains lessons from the Gospel of John, Matthew, and Luke (Evangelistarium), with some lacunae.

The text is written in Greek minuscule letters, on 160 parchment leaves (29 cm by 24 cm), in two columns per page, 25 (and more) lines per page. It contains musical notes. The manuscript contains weekday Gospel lessons.

It contains the text of the pericope John 8:3-11.

== History ==
Scrivener and Gregory dated the manuscript to the 14th century. It is presently assigned by the INTF to the 14th century.

The manuscript was written one Anthimus.

The manuscript was added to the list of New Testament manuscripts by Scrivener (number 161^{e}) and Gregory (number 282^{e}). Gregory saw the manuscript in 1886.

The manuscript is not cited in the critical editions of the Greek New Testament (UBS3).

Currently the codex is housed at the Biblioteca Palatina in Parma (Ms. Pal. 14).

== See also ==
- List of New Testament lectionaries
- Biblical manuscript
- Textual criticism
- Lectionary 281

== Bibliography ==
- Gregory, Caspar René (1900). Textkritik des Neuen Testaments, Vol. 1. Leipzig: J.C. Hinrichs’sche Buchhandlung. p. 411.
