= Lectionary 86 =

Lectionary ℓ 86
- New Testament manuscript
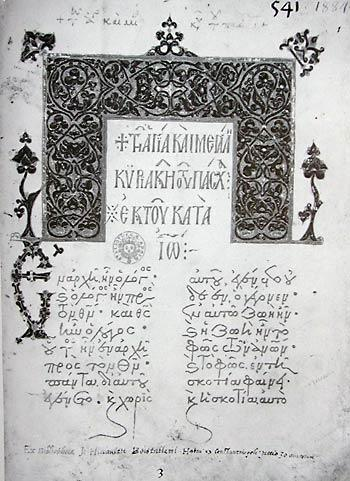
- Text: Evangelistarion
- Date: 1336
- Script: Greek
- Now at: Bibliothèque nationale de France
- Size: 34.2 cm by 25.6 cm

Lectionary 86, designated by siglum ℓ 86 (in the Gregory-Aland numbering), is a Greek manuscript of the New Testament, on parchment leaves. It is dated by a colophon to the year 1336.

== Description ==
The codex contains lessons from the Gospels of John, Matthew, Luke lectionary (Evangelistarium) with some lacunae. It is written in Greek minuscule letters, on 382 large parchment leaves (34.2 cm by 25.6 cm). The writing stands in 2 columns per page, 20 lines per page.

The Pericope de Adultera (John 8:3-11) is placed at the end, marked with obelus, and is not appointed for any day.

== History ==
The manuscript was written by Charito, it was given by a monk Ignatius to the monastery Theotokou at Constantinople. Afterwards it belonged to Boistaller.

There is an inscription on the first page: Ex Bibliotheca Jo. Huraublii Boistallerii. Habui ex Constantinopoli pretio 30 aureorum.

It was described by Bernard de Montfaucon. Scholz examined major part of it. It was examined and described by Paulin Martin. Gregory saw it in 1885. Henri Omont gave a new description of the codex.

The manuscript is not cited in the critical editions of the Greek New Testament (UBS3).

Currently the codex is located in the Bibliothèque nationale de France (Gr. 311) in Paris.

== See also ==
- List of New Testament lectionaries
- Biblical manuscript
- Textual criticism

== Bibliography ==
- Bernard de Montfaucon, Palaeographia Graeca 1708, p. 326.
- Henri Omont, Facsimilés des manuscrits grecs dates de la Bibliothèque Nationale du IXe et XIVe siècle (Paris, 1891), 82.
