= Lectionary 65 =

Lectionary ℓ 65
- New Testament manuscript
- Text: Evangelistarion
- Date: 9th-century
- Script: Greek
- Now at: Bibliothèque nationale de France
- Size: 30 cm by 23.7 cm

Lectionary 65, designated by siglum ℓ 65 (in the Gregory-Aland numbering), is a Greek manuscript of the New Testament, on parchment leaves. It is a lectionary (Evangelistarion). Palaeographically it has been assigned to the 9th-century.

== Description ==
The codex contains lessons from the Gospels. The text of the Gospels lessons following the Byzantine Church order. It is written in Greek uncial letters, on 213 parchment leaves (30 cm by 23.7 cm). It is written in two columns per page, in 20 lines per page. It is a palimpsest, text of lectionary is the upper text.

== History ==
The manuscript was added to the list of New Testament manuscripts by Scholz, who examined many of its pericopes. It was examined and described by Paulin Martin. C. R. Gregory saw it in 1885.

The manuscript is not cited in the critical editions of the Greek New Testament (UBS3).

Currently the codex is located in the Bibliothèque nationale de France (Gr. 282), in Paris.

== See also ==
- List of New Testament lectionaries
- Biblical manuscript
- Textual criticism
