= Minuscule 297 =

- New Testament manuscript
- Text: Gospels
- Date: 12th century
- Script: Greek
- Now at: Bibliothèque nationale de France
- Size: 13.7 cm by 9 cm
- Type: Byzantine text-type
- Category: V
- Note: marginalia

Minuscule 297 (in the Gregory-Aland numbering), ε 1200 (Soden), is a Greek minuscule manuscript of the New Testament, on parchment. Palaeographically it has been assigned to the 12th century. It has marginalia

== Description ==
The codex contains a complete text of the four Gospels on 196 parchment leaves (13.7 cm by 9 cm). The text is written in one column per page, in 28 lines per page.

It contains tables of the κεφαλαια (tables of contents) before each Gospel, (not τιτλοι), some Ammonian Sections, lectionary markings at the margin, incipits, Synaxarion, and Menologion.

On leaf 186 it has some excerpts from Gerasimus.

== Text ==
The Greek text of the codex is a representative of the Byzantine text-type. Aland placed it in Category V. According to the Claremont Profile Method it represents textual family K^{x} in Luke 1; in Luke 10 it has mixed Byzantine text, in Luke 20 it has mixed text.

The text of the Pericope Adulterae (John 7:53-8:11) is omitted, but it was supplied by a later hand.

== History ==
The manuscript was added to the list of New Testament manuscripts by Scholz (1794-1852). It was examined and described by Paulin Martin. C. R. Gregory saw in 1885.

The manuscript is currently housed at the Bibliothèque nationale de France (Suppl. Gr. 140) at Paris.

== See also ==
- List of New Testament minuscules
- Biblical manuscript
- Textual criticism
