= Lectionary 82 =

Lectionary ℓ 82
- New Testament manuscript
- Text: Evangelistarion
- Date: 14th-century
- Script: Greek
- Now at: Bibliothèque nationale de France
- Size: 24.9 cm by 16.7 cm

Lectionary 82, designated by siglum ℓ 82 (in the Gregory-Aland numbering), is a Greek manuscript of the New Testament, on paper leaves. Palaeographically it has been assigned to the 14th-century.

== Description ==
The codex contains lessons from the Gospels of John, Matthew, Luke lectionary (Evangelistarium) with some lacunae. It is written in Greek minuscule letters, on 150 paper leaves (24.96 cm by 16.7 cm). The writing stands in 1 column per page, 27 lines per page. It contains some lessons from Prophets.

== History ==
Scholz examined it partially. It was examined and described by Paulin Martin. C. R. Gregory saw it in 1885.

The manuscript is not cited in the critical editions of the Greek New Testament (UBS3).

Currently the codex is located in the Bibliothèque nationale de France (Gr. 276) in Paris.

== See also ==
- List of New Testament lectionaries
- Biblical manuscript
- Textual criticism
