= Minuscule 318 =

- New Testament manuscript
- Text: John 7:9-12:8
- Date: 14th century
- Script: Greek
- Now at: Bibliothèque nationale de France
- Size: 34 cm by 23.8 cm
- Category: none

Minuscule 318 (in the Gregory-Aland numbering), Θ^{ε409} (Soden), is a Greek minuscule manuscript of the New Testament, on parchment. Palaeographically it has been assigned to the 14th century.

== Description ==
The codex contains the text of the John 7:9-12:8 on 16 parchment leaves (34 cm by 23.8 cm). The text is written in two columns per page, in 58-63 lines per page. Text is in red ink. The biblical text is surrounded by a commentary by Theophylact.

It does not include the Pericope Adulterae (John 7:53-8:11).

Kurt Aland did not place the Greek text of the codex in any Category.

== History ==
The manuscript was added to the list of New Testament manuscripts by Scholz (1794–1852). It was examined and described by Paulin Martin. C. R. Gregory saw the manuscript in 1885.

The manuscript is currently housed at the Bibliothèque nationale de France (Gr. 213) at Paris.

== See also ==
- List of New Testament minuscules
- Biblical manuscript
- Textual criticism
