= Lectionary 144 =

Lectionary ℓ 144
- New Testament manuscript
- Text: Apostolos
- Date: 12th-century
- Script: Greek
- Now at: French National Library
- Size: 34.7 by 27.3 cm

Lectionary 144, designated by sigla ℓ 144 (in the Gregory-Aland numbering) is a Greek manuscript of the New Testament, on parchment leaves. Paleographically it had been assigned to the 12th-century.

== Description ==
The codex contains Lessons from the Acts of the Apostles and Epistles lectionary (Apostolos) with lacunae at end. It is written in Greek minuscule letters, on 302 parchment leaves (34.7 cm by 27.3 cm), in two columns per page, 22 lines per page. It has music notes.

== History ==
The manuscript was brought from Constantinople. It was examined by Paulin Martin, and C. R. Gregory (in 1885).

The manuscript is not cited in the critical editions of the Greek New Testament (UBS3).

Currently the codex is located at the National Library of France (Gr. 304) in Paris.

== See also ==
- List of New Testament lectionaries
- Biblical manuscript
- Textual criticism
