= Minuscule 736 =

- New Testament manuscript
- Text: Gospels †
- Date: 12th century
- Script: Greek
- Now at: Bibliothèque nationale de France
- Size: 27.5 cm by 19.9 cm
- Type: Byzantine text-type
- Category: V
- Note: –

Minuscule 736 (in the Gregory-Aland numbering), Θ^{ε320} (von Soden), is a Greek minuscule manuscript of the New Testament written on parchment. Palaeographically it has been assigned to the 12th century. The manuscript has no complex contents. Scrivener labelled it as 754^{e}.

== Description ==
The codex contains the text of the Gospel of Matthew and Gospel of John, on 235 parchment leaves (size 27.5 cm by 19.9 cm), with some lacunae (Matthew 1:1-16; 2:3-9; 6:3-9:30; John 19:24-34, 20:19-29). The text is written in one column per page, 35 lines per page.

The text is divided according to the κεφαλαια (chapters), whose numbers are given at the margin, with their τιτλοι (titles of chapters) at the top of the pages. There is no another division according to the smaller Ammonian Sections (with references to the Eusebian Canons).

It contains lists of the κεφαλαια before each Gospel.

== Text ==
The Greek text of the codex is a representative of the Byzantine text-type. Aland placed it in Category V.

It was not examined by the Claremont Profile Method.Wisse, Frederik (1982). The Profile Method for the Classification and Evaluation of Manuscript Evidence, as Applied to the Continuous Greek Text of the Gospel of Luke. Grand Rapids: William B. Eerdmans Publishing Company. p. 65. ISBN 0-8028-1918-4.

It lacks the Pericope Adulterae (John 7:53-8:11).

== History ==
Scrivener dated the manuscript to the 11th or 12th century, Gregory dated the manuscript to the 12th century. The manuscript is currently dated by the INTF to the 12th century.

The manuscript was added to the list of New Testament manuscripts by Scrivener (754) and Gregory (736). It was examined and described by Paulin Martin. Gregory saw the manuscript in 1885.

The manuscript is now housed at the Bibliothèque nationale de France (Gr. 198) in Paris.

== See also ==
- List of New Testament minuscules
- Biblical manuscript
- Textual criticism
