= Lectionary 66 =

Lectionary ℓ 66
- New Testament manuscript
- Text: Evangelistarion
- Date: 9th-century
- Script: Greek
- Now at: Bibliothèque nationale de France
- Size: 28.6 cm by 21.1 cm

Lectionary 66, designated by siglum ℓ 66 (in the Gregory-Aland numbering), is a Greek manuscript of the New Testament, on parchment leaves. It is a lectionary (Evangelistarion). Palaeographically it has been assigned to the 9th-century.

== Description ==
The codex contains lessons from the four Gospels. The text of the Gospels lessons following the Byzantine Church order. It is written in Greek uncial letters, on 275 parchment leaves (28.6 cm by 21.1 cm). The writing stands in two columns per page, in 20 lines per page. It is a palimpsest, text of lectionary is the upper and later text. The older reading was misplaced.

== History ==
The manuscript was added to the list of New Testament manuscripts by Scholz, who examined many of its pericopes. It was examined and described by Paulin Martin. C. R. Gregory saw it in 1885.

The manuscript is not cited in the critical editions of the Greek New Testament (UBS3).

Currently the codex is located in the Bibliothèque nationale de France (Gr. 283), in Paris.

== See also ==
- List of New Testament lectionaries
- Biblical manuscript
- Textual criticism
