= Minuscule 430 =

- New Testament manuscript
- Name: Monacensis 437
- Text: Gospel of John 1:1-8:14
- Date: 11th century
- Script: Greek
- Found: 1590
- Now at: Bavarian State Library
- Size: 29 cm by 22 cm
- Type: mixed
- Category: none

Minuscule 430 (in the Gregory-Aland numbering), Ν^{ι11} (in the Soden numbering), is a Greek minuscule manuscript of the New Testament, on a parchment. Palaeographically it has been assigned to the 11th century.

== Description ==
The codex contains only the text of the Gospel of John 1:1-8:14 on 366 parchment leaves (29 cm by 22 cm). It is written in one column per page, in 24 lines per page. The biblical text is surrounded by Nicetas' catena.

Kurt Aland did not place the Greek text of the codex in any Category.

== History ==
The manuscript was bought in 1590 by Leontius from Cyprus for Martin Crusius of Tübingen. Crusius sent it to the library at Augsburg. It was added to the list of the New Testament manuscripts by Scholz (1794–1852). C. R. Gregory saw it in 1887.

It is currently housed at the Bavarian State Library (Gr. 437) in Munich.

== See also ==
- List of New Testament minuscules
- Biblical manuscript
- Textual criticism
