= Minuscule 317 =

- New Testament manuscript
- Text: John 10:9-21:25
- Date: 12th century
- Script: Greek
- Now at: Bibliothèque nationale de France
- Size: 32.7 cm by 23.6 cm
- Category: none

Minuscule 317 (in the Gregory-Aland numbering), N^{ι31} (Soden), is a Greek minuscule manuscript of the New Testament, on parchment. Palaeographically it has been assigned to the 12th century.

== Description ==
The codex contains the text of the John 10:9-21:25 on 352 parchment leaves (32.7 cm by 23.6 cm). The text is written in one column per page, in 29 lines per page. The biblical text is surrounded by a catena.

Kurt Aland did not place the Greek text of the codex in any Category.

== History ==
The manuscript belonged to the family of Medicis (like codex 42). It was added to the list of New Testament manuscripts by Scholz (1794–1852). It was examined and described by Paulin Martin. C. R. Gregory saw the manuscript in 1885.

The manuscript is currently housed at the Bibliothèque nationale de France (Gr. 212) at Paris.

== See also ==
- List of New Testament minuscules
- Biblical manuscript
- Textual criticism
