= Lectionary 67 =

Lectionary ℓ 67
- New Testament manuscript
- Text: Evangelistarion
- Date: 12th-century
- Script: Greek
- Now at: Bibliothèque nationale de France
- Size: 29.4 cm by 22.8 cm

Lectionary 67, designated by siglum ℓ 67 (in the Gregory-Aland numbering), is a Greek manuscript of the New Testament, on parchment leaves. It is a lectionary (Evangelistarion). Palaeographically it has been assigned to the 12th-century.

== Description ==
The codex contains lessons from the Gospels with some lacunae. It is written in Greek minuscule letters, on 270 parchment leaves (29.4 cm by 22.8 cm). The writing stands in two columns per page, in 18 lines per page. It contains a musical notes.

== History ==
The manuscript was added to the list of New Testament manuscripts by Scholz. It was examined and described by Paulin Martin. C. R. Gregory saw it in 1885.

The manuscript is not cited in the critical editions of the Greek New Testament (UBS3).

Currently the codex is located in the Bibliothèque nationale de France (Gr. 284), in Paris.

== See also ==
- List of New Testament lectionaries
- Biblical manuscript
- Textual criticism
