= Minuscule 656 =

- New Testament manuscript
- Text: New Testament †
- Date: 12th century
- Script: Greek
- Now at: Berlin State Library
- Size: 13.3 cm by 10 cm
- Type: Byzantine text-type
- Category: V

Minuscule 656 (in the Gregory-Aland numbering), δ 463 (von Soden), is a Greek minuscule manuscript of the New Testament, on parchment. Palaeographically it has been assigned to the 12th century. The manuscript is lacunose. Scrivener labelled it by 642^{e}.

== Description ==
The codex contains the text of the New Testament, on 140 parchment leaves (size 13.3 cm by 10 cm) with a large lacunae at the beginning and end (Matthew, Mark, Luke 24:51; 2 Thessalonians–Hebrews, Book of Revelation). The manuscript begins with Luke 24:51, and ends after 1 Thessalonians. It probably once contained all the New Testament.

The text is written in one column per page, 30-40 lines per page, in very small letters. It contains the lists of the κεφαλαια before every book. The text is divided according to the κεφαλαια (chapters) and Ammonian Sections. The numbers of the κεφαλαια are given on the left margin, and their τιτλοι (titles) are placed at the top. The Ammonian Sections are given with a references to the Eusebian Canons on the left margin. The number of the Ammonian Sections is usual. It contains also lectionary markings noticed lessons for reading in the feasts, subscriptions at the end of the books, and stichoi.

== Text ==
The Greek text of the codex is a representative of the Byzantine text-type. Kurt Aland placed it in Category V. It was not examined by using the Claremont Profile Method because of defective text of the manuscript.

The text of the Pericope Adulterae (John 7:53-8:11) is marked with an obelus, it means the authenticity of this text was doubtful for the scribe.

== History ==
The manuscript was variously dated in the past. Scrivener dated the manuscript to the 11th century, Gregory dated it to the 14th century. Currently the manuscript is dated by the INTF to the 12th century.

Formerly the manuscript was housed in Berlin (König. Bibl. Gr. Octavo 9).

Currently the manuscript is housed at the Berlin State Library (Graec. octavo 9), in Berlin.

== See also ==
- List of New Testament minuscules
- Biblical manuscript
- Textual criticism
- Minuscule 653
