= Minuscule 423 =

- New Testament manuscript
- Text: Gospel of Matthew, Gospel of John
- Date: 1556
- Script: Greek
- Now at: Bavarian State Library
- Size: 33.9 cm by 23.7 cm
- Category: none
- Note: no marginalia

Minuscule 423 (in the Gregory-Aland numbering), Ν^{μ60} Ν^{ι60} (in the Soden numbering), is a Greek minuscule manuscript of the New Testament, on paper. It is dated by a colophon to the year 1556.

== Description ==
The codex contains the text of the Gospel of Matthew and Gospel of John in two volumes on 465 + 576 paper leaves (33.9 cm by 23.7 cm). It is written in one column per page, in 30 lines per page. The biblical text is surrounded by a catena of Nicetas.

Kurt Aland did not place the Greek text of the codex in any Category.

== History ==
The name of the scribe was Emmanuel.

The manuscript was added to the list of New Testament manuscripts by Scholz (1794–1852). It was examined by Dean Burgon. C. R. Gregory saw it in 1887.

The manuscript is currently housed at the Bavarian State Library (Gr. 36.37) in Munich.

== See also ==
- List of New Testament minuscules
- Biblical manuscript
- Textual criticism
