= Minuscule 338 =

- New Testament manuscript
- Text: Gospels
- Date: 10th century
- Script: Greek
- Now at: Turin National University Library
- Size: 14 cm by 10.7 cm
- Category: none
- Note: marginalia

Minuscule 338 (in the Gregory-Aland numbering), ε 1006 (Soden), is a Greek minuscule manuscript of the New Testament, on parchment. Palaeographically it has been assigned to the 10th century. The manuscript has complex contents. It has marginalia.

== Description ==
The codex contains a complete text of the four Gospels on 365 parchment leaves (14 cm by 10.7 cm). It is written in one column per page, in 18 lines per page.

The text is divided according to the κεφαλαια (chapters), whose numbers are given at the margin, and their τιτλοι (titles of chapters) at the top of the pages. There is also a division according to the smaller Ammonian Sections (in Mark 233 Sections, the last in 16:8), with references to the Eusebian Canons (written below Ammonian Section numbers).

It contains the Epistula ad Carpianum, the Eusebian Canon tables, tables of the κεφαλαια (tables of contents) before each Gospel, and pictures.

== Text ==
Kurt Aland did not place the Greek text of the codex in any Category. It was not examined by the Claremont Profile Method.

The texts of John 5:4 and John 7:53-8:11 are marked by an obelus.

== History ==
The manuscript was examined by Pasino, Scholz, and Burgon. It was added to the list of New Testament manuscripts by Scholz (1794-1852). C. R. Gregory saw it in 1886.

The manuscript is currently housed at the Turin National University Library (B. VII. 33) in Turin. Three folios of the codex are housed in the same library but on the shelf number B. VI. 43.

== See also ==
- List of New Testament minuscules
- Biblical manuscript
- Textual criticism
