= Minuscule 800 =

Coordinates: 37°58′52.5″N 23°43′59.4″E

- New Testament manuscript
- Text: Gospels
- Date: 12th century
- Script: Greek
- Now at: National Library of Greece
- Size: 27 cm by 19.5 cm
- Type: Byzantine text-type
- Category: none
- Note: –

Minuscule 800 (in the Gregory-Aland numbering), A^{407} (von Soden), is a Greek minuscule manuscript of the New Testament written on parchment. Palaeographically it has been assigned to the 12th century. The manuscript is lacunose.

== Description ==
The codex contains the text of the four Gospels, on 217 parchment leaves (size 27 cm by 19.5 cm), with some lacunae (John 13:29-18:23; 19:24-21:25). The biblical text is surrounded by catenae. The biblical text is written in 21 lines per page, the text of the commentary in 50 lines per page.

The text is divided according to the κεφαλαια (chapters), whose numbers are given at the margin, with their τιτλοι (titles) at the top of the pages (with a Harmony). There is also another division according to the smaller Ammonian Sections (in Mark 234 sections, the last section in 16:9), with references to the Eusebian Canons.

It contains Prolegomena to Mark and John, lists of the κεφαλαια (tables of contents) before each of the Gospels, and subscriptions at the end each of the Gospels. Subscriptions were added by a later hand.

== Text ==
Aland the Greek text of the codex did not placed in any Category V.

It was not examined according to the Claremont Profile Method.

It lacks the Pericope Adulterae (John 7:53-8:11).

== History ==
According to C. R. Gregory the manuscript was written in the 12th century. The manuscript is currently dated by the INTF to the 12th century.

It was added to the list of New Testament manuscripts by Gregory (800). Gregory saw the manuscript in 1886.

The manuscript is now housed at the National Library of Greece (65) in Athens.

== See also ==
- List of New Testament minuscules
- Biblical manuscript
- Textual criticism
- Minuscule 799
