= Lectionary 139 =

Lectionary ℓ 139
- New Testament manuscript
- Text: Evangelistarion
- Date: 10th/11th century
- Script: Greek
- Now at: Biblioteca Marciana
- Size: 32 cm by 24 cm

Lectionary 139, designated by siglum ℓ 139 (in the Gregory-Aland numbering) is a Greek manuscript of the New Testament, on parchment leaves. Palaeographically it has been assigned to the 10th or 11th century.

== Description ==
The codex contains Lessons from the Gospels of John, Matthew, Luke lectionary (Evangelistarium), on 219 parchment leaves (32 cm by 24 cm), with some lacunae at the beginning. It is written in Greek minuscule letters, in two columns per page, 17 lines per page.

It contains the pericope John 8:3-11 on the last 219 leaf. Leaf 83 moved at the end, leaf 218 at the beginning. It has many erasures.

== History ==
The manuscript was added to the list of New Testament manuscripts by Scholz. It was examined by Scholz, Bessarion, and Gregory.

The manuscript is not cited in the critical editions of the Greek New Testament (UBS3).

Currently the codex is located in the Biblioteca Marciana (Gr. Z. 12 (348)), in Venice.

== See also ==
- List of New Testament lectionaries
- Biblical manuscript
- Textual criticism

== Bibliography ==
- J. M. A. Scholz, Biblisch-kritische Reise in Frankreich, der Schweiz, Italien, Palästine und im Archipel in den Jahren 1818, 1819, 1820, 1821: Nebst einer Geschichte des Textes des Neuen Testaments.
