= Lectionary 107 =

Lectionary ℓ 107
- New Testament manuscript
- Text: Evangelistarion
- Date: 12th-century
- Script: Greek
- Now at: Biblioteca Marciana
- Size: 30.5 cm by 22.5 cm

Lectionary 107, designated by siglum ℓ 107 (in the Gregory-Aland numbering) is a Greek manuscript of the New Testament, on parchment leaves. Palaeographically it has been assigned to the 12th-century.

== Description ==
The codex contains Lessons from the Gospels of John, Matthew, Luke lectionary (Evangelistarium). It has not lacunae. It is written in Greek minuscule letters, on 265 parchment leaves (30.5 cm by 22.5 cm), in 2 columns per page, 20 lines per page. It contains pictures. It contains the Pericope Adulterae (John 8:3-11).

== History ==
The manuscript was added to the list of New Testament manuscripts by Scholz. It was examined by Dean Burgon.

The manuscript is not cited in the critical editions of the Greek New Testament (UBS3).

Currently the codex is located in the Biblioteca Marciana (Gr. Z. 548 (787)) in Venice.

== See also ==
- List of New Testament lectionaries
- Biblical manuscript
- Textual criticism

== Bibliography ==
- Gregory, Caspar René (1900). Textkritik des Neuen Testaments. Vol. 1. Leipzig: J.C. Hinrichs. p. 396.
