= Lectionary 146 =

Lectionary ℓ 146
- New Testament manuscript
- Text: Evangelistarion
- Date: 12th century
- Script: Greek
- Now at: Cambridge University Library
- Size: 39.8 by 30.1 cm

Lectionary 146, designated by sigla ℓ 146 (in the Gregory-Aland numbering) is a Greek manuscript of the New Testament, on parchment leaves. Paleographically it has been assigned to the 12th century.

== Description ==
The codex contains Lessons from the Gospels of John, Matthew, Luke lectionary (Evangelistarium), on 212 parchment leaves (39.8 cm by 30.1 cm), with lacunae at the end. It is written in Greek minuscule letters, in two columns per page, 29 lines per page. It has no music notes. It contains the pericope John 8:3-11. It has Synaxarion and Menologion. It is neatly written.

== History ==
The manuscript was brought from Constantinople. The manuscript was examined by Hort and Gregory.

The manuscript is not cited in the critical editions of the Greek New Testament (UBS3).

Currently the codex is located in the Cambridge University Library (Dd. 8.23).

== See also ==
- List of New Testament lectionaries
- Biblical manuscript
- Textual criticism
