= Minuscule 844 =

- New Testament manuscript
- Text: Gospels †
- Date: 15th century
- Script: Greek
- Now at: University of Padua
- Size: 13.5 cm by 10.3 cm
- Type: Byzantine text-type
- Category: V
- Note: —

Minuscule 844 (in the Gregory-Aland numbering), ε505 (von Soden), is a 15th-century Greek minuscule manuscript of the New Testament on parchment. The manuscript is not complete.

== Description ==
The codex contains the text of the four Gospels on 232 parchment leaves (size 13.5 cm by 10.3 cm) with some lacunae (Matthew 1:1–10; Mark 1:1–10; 15:4 [14:60]-16:20; Luke 1:1–12; John 1:1–16) The text is written in one column per page, 20 lines per page. It contains one fragment of Apostolos. The portraits of the Evangelists and the decorated headpieces were lost.

The text is divided according to the Ammonian Sections, whose numbers are given art the margin, but without references to the Eusebian Canons.

It contains the tables of the κεφαλαια (tables of contents) before each Gospel, and lectionary markings at the margin, Synaxarion, Menologion, and subscriptions at the end of each of the Gospels.

== Text ==
The Greek text of the codex is a representative of the Byzantine text-type. Hermann von Soden classified it to the textual family K^{x}. Kurt Aland the Greek text of the codex placed in Category V. According to the Claremont Profile Method it represents mixed text in Luke 1 (fragmentary), mixture of the Byzantine families in Luke 10, textual cluster 1519 in Luke 20.

The Pericope Adulterae (John 7:53–8:11) is marked by an obelus.

== History ==
C. R. Gregory dated the manuscript to the 15th century. Currently the manuscript is dated by the INTF to the 15th century.

The manuscript was added to the list of New Testament manuscripts by Gregory (844^{e}). It was examined by Oscar von Gebhardt in 1882.

Currently the manuscript is housed at the University of Padua (Ms. 695), in Padua.

== See also ==
- List of New Testament minuscules
- Biblical manuscript
- Textual criticism
