= Minuscule 733 =

- New Testament manuscript
- Text: Gospels †
- Date: 12th century
- Script: Greek
- Now at: Bibliothèque nationale de France
- Size: 29.7 cm by 22.3 cm
- Type: ?
- Category: none
- Note: commentary marginalia

Minuscule 733 (in the Gregory-Aland numbering), Θ^{ε324} (von Soden), is a Greek minuscule manuscript of the New Testament written on parchment. Palaeographically it has been assigned to the 12th century. The manuscript has no complex contents. Scrivener labelled it as 751^{e}. It has marginalia.

== Description ==
The codex contains the text of the four Gospels on 347 parchment leaves (size 29.7 cm by 22.3 cm), with one lacuna (Mark 1:1-3; 16:15-fin; John 3:6-5:21). The text of Luke 1:1-5 was supplied by a later hand. The text is written in one column per page, 40-47 lines per page.

The text is divided according to the κεφαλαια (chapters), whose numbers are given at the margin, and their τιτλοι (titles) at the top. There is no another division according to the smaller Ammonian Sections, with references to the Eusebian Canons.

It contains Prolegomena, tables of the κεφαλαια (tables of contents) before each Gospel. It has a commentary, and portrait of Evangelist Matthew.

== Text ==
Aland did not place the Greek text of the codex in any Category.

It was not examined by using the Claremont Profile Method.

== History ==
Scrivener and Gregory dated the manuscript to the 12th century. The manuscript is currently dated by the INTF to the 12th century.

The manuscript was added to the list of New Testament manuscripts by Scrivener (751) and Gregory (733). It was examined and described by Paulin Martin. Gregory saw the manuscript in 1885.

The manuscript is now housed at the Bibliothèque nationale de France (Gr. 190) in Paris.

== See also ==
- List of New Testament minuscules
- Biblical manuscript
- Textual criticism
