= Minuscule 542 =

- New Testament manuscript
- Text: Gospels †
- Date: 15th century
- Script: Greek
- Now at: University of Michigan
- Size: 17.7 cm by 13.6 cm
- Type: Byzantine text-type
- Hand: neatly written
- Note: full marginalia not accessible

Minuscule 542 (in the Gregory-Aland numbering), ε 336 (in Soden's numbering), is a Greek minuscule manuscript of the New Testament, on a parchment. Palaeographically it has been assigned to the 15th century. Scrivener labelled it by number 555. The manuscript is lacunose. Currently it is inaccessible.

== Description ==
The codex contains the text of the four Gospels, on 264 parchment leaves (size 17.7 cm by 13.6 cm), with lacunae at the end (John 19:25-21:1). The text is written in one column per page, 24 lines per page. It is neatly written. There are breathings and accents used correctly. The iota subscriptum is rare. The nomina sacra are written in an abbreviated forms.

According tο Scrivener Movable nu occurs only seven times, a hiatus for the lack of it thrice. There are not many itacistic errors, except ο for ω.

The text is divided according to the κεφαλαια (chapters), whose numbers are given at the margin, and their τιτλοι (titles) in red at the top and foot of the pages. There is also a division according to the smaller Ammonian Sections (in Mark 232 Sections, the last section in 16:6) stand at the margin, with references to the Eusebian Canons under them (very partially). There are also Verses (the smallest sections).

It contains Prolegomena, lists of the κεφαλαια (tables of contents) before each Gospel (three of them in red). The Church lessons stand also at the margin in red. It has incipits, Synaxarion, Menologion, subscriptions at the end of each Gospel, and portraits of the four Evangelists (before each Gospel).

The text of Luke 22:43-44 and the Pericope Adulterae are omitted.

The eight leaves of the codex contained Matthew 7:1-10:18 were misplaced by the binder at Matthew 26:26.

== Text ==
The Greek text of the codex is a representative of the Byzantine. Aland did not place it in any Category, because the manuscript was not accessible for him.

It was not examined by the Claremont Profile Method (inaccessible).

It has a few textual variations (e.g. Matthew 12:37; 13:32; 21:46; 23:25; Mark 9:28; 10:1.17; 13:11; 14:12; Luke 1:27; 8:14; 12:21; John 2:22; 12:40.42; 15:10; 19:17).

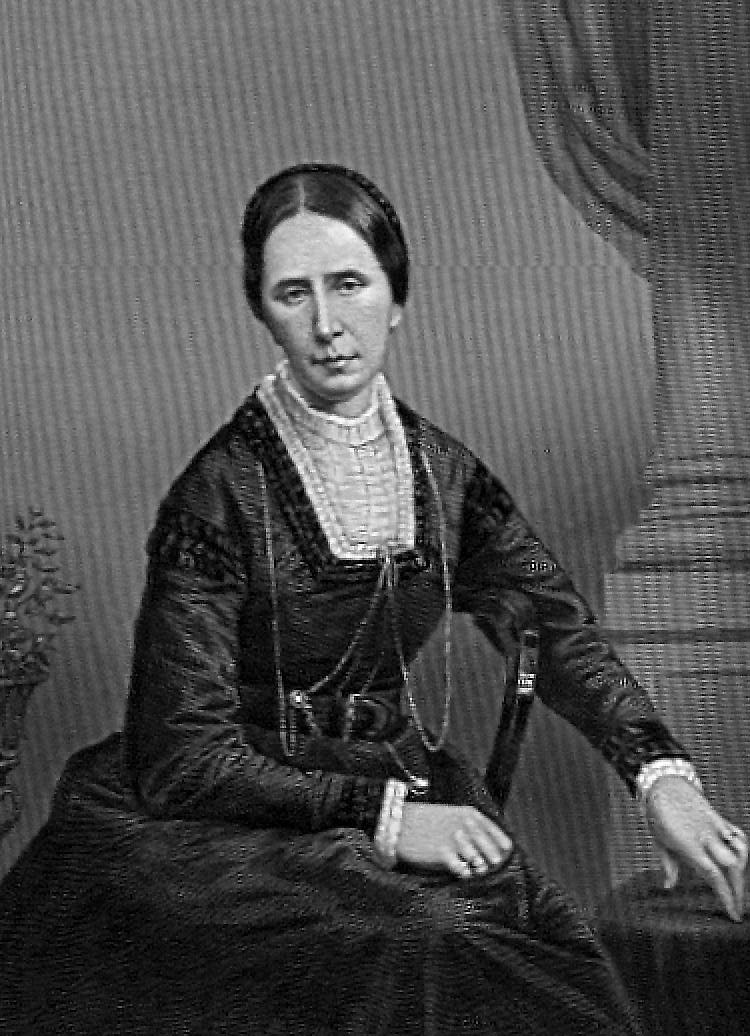
The Lady Burdett-Coutts

== History ==
Dated, probably by the first hand, to the year 1323, but dated by paleographers to the 15th century. According to Robert mathiesen it was written in the second half of the 16th century.

In 1864 the manuscript was purchased from a dealer at Janina in Epeiros, by Baroness Burdett-Coutts (1814–1906), a philanthropist, together with other Greek manuscripts (among them codices 532-546). They were transported to England in 1870-1871.

The manuscript was added to the list of the New Testament minuscule manuscripts by F. H. A. Scrivener (555) and C. R. Gregory (542). Gregory saw it in 1883.

The manuscript was presented by Burdett-Coutts to Sir Roger Cholmely's School, and was housed at the Highgate (Burdett-Coutts III. 4.13), in London. It was examined and collated by Scrivener in his Adversaria critica sacra (1893).

The current storage location of the manuscript is unknown.

== See also ==
- List of New Testament minuscules
- Biblical manuscript
- Textual criticism
