= Minuscule 416 =

- New Testament manuscript
- Text: Gospels †
- Date: 14th century
- Script: Greek
- Now at: Biblioteca Marciana
- Size: 19.5 cm by 15 cm
- Type: Byzantine text-type
- Category: none
- Hand: roughly written
- Note: full marginalia

Minuscule 416 (in the Gregory-Aland numbering; ε 422 (in the Soden numbering), is a Greek minuscule parchment manuscript of the New Testament. Via palaeography it has been assigned to the 14th century. The marginal equipment is full.

== Description ==
The codex contains the text of the four Gospels on 153 parchment leaves (19.5 cm by 15 cm), with numerous lacunae (Matthew 1:1-25:36; 26:17-27:17; 27:33-Mark 2:25; John 18:8-21:25). The text's format is one column per page, with 22 lines per page. The hand in which it is written is very rough.

The text is divided according to the Ammonian Sections (in Mark 234 Sections, 16:9), whose numbers are given at the margin, with references to the Eusebian Canons (written below Ammonian Section numbers). The division according to the κεφαλαια (chapters), with τιτλοι (titles), was added by later hand.

It contains tables of the κεφαλαια (tables of contents) before each Gospel, subscriptions at the end of each Gospel, Synaxarion, Menologion, pictures, lectionary markings at the margin (added by later hand), and αναγνωσεις (lessons).

== Text ==
The Greek text of the codex is a representative of the Byzantine text-type. Kurt Aland did not place it in any Category.

According to the Claremont Profile Method it represents K^{x} in Luke 1. In Luke 10 and Luke 20 it has mixed Byzantine text.

The text of the Pericope Adulterae (John 7:53-8:11) is omitted.

== History ==
Wiedmann and J. G. J. Braun collated some portions of the manuscript for Scholz (1794-1852). The manuscript was added to the list of New Testament manuscripts by Scholz. C. R. Gregory saw it in 1886.

The manuscript is currently housed at the Biblioteca Marciana (Gr. I. 24) in Venice.

== See also ==
- List of New Testament minuscules
- Biblical manuscript
- Textual criticism
