= Lectionary 280 =

Lectionary ℓ 280
- New Testament manuscript
- Text: Evangelistarium
- Date: 14th century
- Script: Greek
- Now at: Venice
- Size: 24.5 cm by 18 cm
- Type: Byzantine text-type
- Note: illuminated

Lectionary 280, designated by siglum ℓ 280 (in the Gregory-Aland numbering) is a Greek manuscript of the New Testament, on parchment. Palaeographically it has been assigned to the 14th century. Scrivener labelled it as 185^{e}.

The manuscript has complex contents.

== Description ==
The codex contains lessons from the Gospel of John, Matthew, and Luke (Evangelistarium).

The text is written in Greek minuscule letters, on 240 parchment leaves (24.5 cm by 18 cm), in two columns per page, 28 lines per page. The manuscript contains weekday Gospel lessons.

The manuscript is bound in red velvet, and according to Scrivener in excellent preservation.

It contains text of the pericope John 8:3-11.

== History ==
Scrivener dated the manuscript to the 14th century, and Gregory to the 12th century. It has been assigned by the Institute for New Testament Textual Research to the 14th century.

The manuscript was written in Constantinople. The name of scribe was Nikolaos.

The manuscript was added to the list of New Testament manuscripts by Scrivener (number 185^{e}) and Gregory (number 280^{e}). Gregory saw the manuscript in 1886.

The manuscript is not cited in the critical editions of the Greek New Testament (UBS3).

The codex is housed at the Istituto Ellenico di Studi Bizantini e Postbizantini (G') in Venice.

== See also ==
- List of New Testament lectionaries
- Biblical manuscript
- Textual criticism
- Lectionary 279

== Bibliography ==
- Gregory, Caspar René (1900). Textkritik des Neuen Testaments. Vol. 1. Leipzig: J.C. Hinrichs’sche Buchhandlung. p. 411.
