= Lectionary 281 =

Lectionary ℓ 281
- New Testament manuscript
- Text: Evangelistarium
- Date: 14th century
- Script: Greek
- Now at: University of Bologna
- Size: 34.5 cm by 24.5 cm
- Type: Byzantine text-type
- Note: illuminated

Lectionary 281, designated by siglum ℓ 281 (in the Gregory-Aland numbering) is a Greek manuscript of the New Testament, on parchment. Palaeographically it has been assigned to the 14th century. Scrivener labelled it as 160^{e}.

The manuscript has complex contents.

== Description ==
The codex contains lessons from the Gospel of John, Matthew, and Luke (Evangelistarium).

The text is written in Greek minuscule letters, on 236 parchment leaves (34.5 cm by 24.5 cm), in two columns per page, 27 (and more) lines per page. The manuscript contains weekday Gospel lessons.

It contains the text of the Pericope Adulterae (John 8:3-11).

== History ==
Scrivener and Gregory dated the manuscript to the 14th century. It has been assigned by the Institute for New Testament Textual Research to the 14th century.

The manuscript was written one Anthimus.

The manuscript was added to the list of New Testament manuscripts by Scrivener (number 160^{e}) and Gregory (number 281^{e}). Gregory saw the manuscript in 1886.

The manuscript is not cited in the critical editions of the Greek New Testament (UBS3).

The codex is housed at the University of Bologna (3638) in Bologna.

== See also ==
- List of New Testament lectionaries
- Biblical manuscript
- Textual criticism
- Lectionary 280

== Bibliography ==
- Gregory, Caspar René (1900). Textkritik des Neuen Testaments, Vol. 1. Leipzig: J.C. Hinrichs’sche Buchhandlung. p. 411.
