= Minuscule 31 =

- New Testament manuscript
- Text: Gospels
- Date: 13th century
- Script: Greek
- Now at: National Library of France
- Size: 18 cm by 14.1 cm
- Type: Byzantine/mixed
- Category: none
- Note: marginalia

Minuscule 31 (in the Gregory-Aland numbering), ε 375 (Von Soden), formerly known as Colbertinus 6063, is a Greek minuscule manuscript of the New Testament with marginalia, written on vellum and paper. Palaeographically it has been assigned to the 13th century.

== Description ==
The codex contains a complete text of the four Gospels on 188 paper leaves (18 cm by 14.1 cm). The texts of Luke 3:38-4:19; 5:39-6:33 were supplied by a later hand. The manuscript is ornamented.

The text is written in one column per page, 25 lines per page, with wide margins (size of column 13.2 by 9.2 cm). The titles are in colour. The text is divided according to the κεφαλαια (chapters), whose numbers are given at the margin, and the τιτλοι (titles of chapters) at the top of the pages.

It contains tables of the κεφαλαια (tables of contents) before Gospel of Mark, Gospel of Luke, and Gospel of John but added by a later hand, prayers, and pictures. The text of the codex was many times corrected.

== Text ==
Kurt Aland did not place the Greek text of the codex in any Category. According to the Claremont Profile Method it represents textual family K^{x} in Luke 1 and Luke 20. In Luke 10 no profile was made.

It has many erasures and corrections.

== History ==
It is dated by the INTF to the 13th century.

The manuscript was used by John Mill (as Colbertinus 4 after Matthew). It was added to the list of the New Testament manuscripts by J. J. Wettstein, who gave it the number 31. It was examined and described by Scholz and it was examined by Paulin Martin. C. R. Gregory saw the manuscript in 1885.

It is currently housed at the Bibliothèque nationale de France (Gr. 94) at Paris.

== See also ==
- List of New Testament minuscules
- Biblical manuscripts
- Textual criticism
