= Minuscule 303 =

- New Testament manuscript
- Text: Gospels †
- Date: 1255
- Script: Greek
- Now at: Bibliothèque nationale de France
- Size: 29.2 cm by 23.2 cm
- Type: Byzantine text-type
- Category: V

Minuscule 303 (in the Gregory-Aland numbering), Θ^{ε32} (Soden), is a Greek minuscule manuscript of the New Testament, on cotton paper. It is dated by a colophon to the year 1255.

== Description ==
The codex contains the text of the four Gospels on 321 paper leaves (29.2 cm by 23.2 cm) with some lacunae. The text is written in one column per page, in 33 lines per page. John 1:1-3:29 is written on vellum.

It contains Synaxarion (added by later hand) and numbers of Verses at the end of each Gospel. It contains Homilies of Chrysostomos to Matthew 13-14, and some iambic verses. The biblical text is surrounded by a catena. The commentary is of Theophylact's authorship.

== Text ==
The Greek text of the codex is a representative of the Byzantine text-type. Aland placed it in Category V. It was not examined by the Claremont Profile Method.

== History ==
The manuscript was written by Nicander, a monk. It was added to the list of New Testament manuscripts by Scholz (1794–1852). The manuscript was examined by Wettstein and Scholz (1794–1852). It was examined and described by Paulin Martin. C. R. Gregory saw the manuscript in 1885.

The manuscript is currently housed at the Bibliothèque nationale de France (Gr. 194A) at Paris.

== See also ==
- List of New Testament minuscules
- Biblical manuscript
- Textual criticism
