= Minuscule 135 =

- New Testament manuscript
- Text: Gospels
- Date: 10th-century
- Script: Greek
- Now at: Vatican Library
- Size: 24.5 cm by 20.2 cm
- Type: Byzantine text-type
- Category: V
- Hand: elegant
- Note: marginalia

Minuscule 135 (in the Gregory-Aland numbering), ε 1000 (Soden), is a Greek minuscule manuscript of the New Testament, on parchment leaves. Palaeographically it has been assigned to the 10th-century. The codex has complex contents. It has marginalia.

== Description ==
The codex contains the text of the four Gospels on 174 thick parchment leaves (size 24.5 cm by 20.2 cm). The text is written in one column per page, 25 lines per page. The first 26 leaves with text of Matthew 1:1-20:12 are paper, they were added in the 15th century. The ink is brown, the great initial letters in black. It was written by an elegant hand.

The text is divided according to the κεφαλαια (chapters), whose numbers are given at the margin, and their τιτλοι (titles) at the top of the pages. There is also another division according to the smaller Ammonian Sections (in Mark 241 Sections, last numbered section in 241), but without references to the Eusebian Canons.

It contains the tables of the κεφαλαια (tables of contents) before each Gospel (except John), pictures, and numbers of verses at the end of each Gospel.

== Text ==
The Greek text of the codex is a representative of the Byzantine text-type. Hermann von Soden classified it as a member of the textual family K^{x}. Aland placed it in Category V.

According to the Claremont Profile Method it represents textual family K^{x} in Luke 1, Luke 10, and Luke 20.

The text of the Pericope Adulterae (John 7:53-8:11) is added at the end of John.

== History ==
C. R. Gregory dated the manuscript to the 10th century. Currently it is dated by the INTF to the 10th-century.

The manuscript was slightly examined by Birch (about 1782), who described it as the first to do so in about 1782. C. R. Gregory saw it in 1886.

It is currently housed at the Vatican Library (Vat. gr. 365), at Rome.

== See also ==
- List of New Testament minuscules
- Biblical manuscript
- Textual criticism
