= Minuscule 896 =

- New Testament manuscript
- Text: Gospels
- Date: 12th century
- Script: Greek
- Now at: Cambridge University Library
- Size: 22.5 cm by 17 cm
- Type: Byzantine
- Category: V
- Note: marginalia

Minuscule 896 (in the Gregory-Aland numbering), is a 12th-century Greek minuscule manuscript of the New Testament on parchment. It has marginalia. The manuscript has survived in complete condition.

== Description ==
The codex contains the text of the four Gospels, on 275 parchment leaves (size 22.5 cm by 17 cm). The text is written in one column per page, 23 lines per page.

The text of the Gospels is divided according to the κεφαλαια (chapters), whose numbers are given at the margin, and their τιτλοι (titles of chapters) at the top of the pages. There is also a division according to the smaller Ammonian Sections (in Mark 233 sections, the last section in Mark 16:8), whose numbers are given at the margin. There is no references to the Eusebian Canons.

The later hand added lectionary markings at the margin (for liturgical use) and subscriptions at the end of each Gospel, with numbers of στιχοι.

== Text ==
The Greek text of the codex is a representative of the Byzantine. Kurt Aland placed it in Category V.

According to the Claremont Profile Method it represents the textual cluster 1167 in Luke 1, Luke 10 and Luke 20.

It does not contain the text of the Pericope Adulterae.

== History ==
According to C. R. Gregory it was written in the 12th century. Currently the manuscript is dated by the INTF to the 12th century. It once belonged to one Nicolaus. Gregory saw it in 1883.

The manuscript was added to the list of New Testament manuscripts by Gregory (896^{e}).

It is not cited in critical editions of the Greek New Testament (UBS4, NA28).

The manuscript is housed at the Cambridge University Library (MS Add.6677), in Cambridge.

== See also ==
- List of New Testament minuscules (1–1000)
- Biblical manuscript
- Textual criticism
