= Minuscule 213 =

Greek minuscule manuscript of the New Testament

- New Testament manuscript
- Text: Gospels †
- Date: 11th century
- Script: Greek
- Now at: Biblioteca Marciana
- Size: 20.5 cm by 15.5 cm
- Category: none
- Note: marginalia

Minuscule 213 (in the Gregory-Aland numbering), ε 129 (Soden), is a Greek minuscule manuscript of the New Testament, on parchment. Palaeographically it has been assigned to the 11th century. It has marginalia.

== Description ==
The codex contains almost complete text of the four Gospels, with only one lacunae, on 356 parchment leaves (size 20.5 cm by 15.5 cm); the leaves are arranged in octavo (8 leaves in quire). The text of John 19:6-21:25 was supplied in the 14th or 15th century.

The text is written in one column per page, 18 lines per page.

The text is divided according to the κεφαλαια (chapters), whose numbers are given at the margin, the τιτλοι (titles of chapters) at the top of the pages. There is also a division according to the smaller Ammonian Sections (in Mark 234, 16:9), with references to the Eusebian Canons, but often irregular used.

It contains the Eusebian Canon tables at the beginning, lectionary markings at the margin for liturgical reading, a few αναγνωσεις (lessons), pictures, and numbers of Verses at the end of each Gospel.

== Text ==
The Greek text of the codex Kurt Aland did not include its text to any Category.

According to the Claremont Profile Method it has mixed text in Luke 1, Luke 10, and Luke 20.

It lacks the text of the Pericope Adulterae (John 7:53-8:11).

== History ==
The manuscript was examined by Birch and Burgon. C. R. Gregory saw it in 1886.

It is currently housed at the Biblioteca Marciana (Gr. Z 542), at Venice.

== See also ==
- List of New Testament minuscules
- Biblical manuscript
- Textual criticism
