= Minuscule 499 =

- New Testament manuscript
- Text: Gospels †
- Date: 12th-century
- Script: Greek
- Found: 1849
- Now at: British Library
- Size: 23.8 cm by 17 cm
- Type: Byzantine text-type
- Category: V

Minuscule 499 (in the Gregory-Aland numbering), ε 244 (in the Soden numbering), is a Greek minuscule manuscript of the New Testament, on parchment. Palaeographically it has been assigned to the 12th-century. Scrivener labelled it by number 586. The manuscript is lacunose.

== Description ==
The codex contains the text of the four Gospels on 216 parchment leaves (size 23.8 cm by 17 cm) with some lacunae (Matthew 1:1-12:21; John 17:13-21:25). The text is written in one column per page, 22 lines per page.

The text is divided according to the Ammonian Sections, whose numbers are given at the margin. There is no references to Eusebian Canons. It contains incipits, and lectionary markings at the margin for liturgical use. The genealogy in Luke 3:23-38 is written in three columns.

The Pericope Adulterae (John 7:53-8:11) is omitted.

== Text ==
The Greek text of the codex is a representative of the Byzantine text-type. According to Hermann von Soden it is related to the Byzantine commentated text. Aland placed it in Category V. According to the Claremont Profile Method it belongs to the textual family K^{x} in Luke 1 and Luke 20. In Luke 10 it has mixed Byzantine text.

== History ==
It is dated by the INTF to the 12th-century.

The manuscript was bought in 1849 for the British Museum. The manuscript was added to the list of New Testament manuscripts by Scrivener (586). Gregory renumbered it to 499. It was examined by Bloomfield, Scrivener, and Gregory. Gregory saw it in 1883.

It is currently housed at the British Library (Add MS 17741) in London.

== See also ==
- List of New Testament minuscules
- Biblical manuscript
- Textual criticism
