= Minuscule 207 =

- New Testament manuscript
- Text: Gospels
- Date: 11th century
- Script: Greek
- Now at: Biblioteca Marciana
- Size: 27.6 cm by 21.3 cm
- Type: Byzantine
- Category: V
- Note: marginalia

Minuscule 207 (in the Gregory-Aland numbering), ε 126 (Soden), is a Greek minuscule manuscript of the New Testament, on parchment. Palaeographically it has been assigned to the 11th century. The manuscript is lacunose. It has marginalia.

== Description ==
The codex contains the text of the four Gospels on 267 parchment leaves (size 27.6 cm by 21.3 cm), with some lacunae (Matthew 1:1-13; Mark 1:1-11 - for the sake of illuminations). It is written in two columns per page, in 22 lines per page.

The text is divided according to the κεφαλαια (chapters), whose numbers are given at the margin, and the τιτλοι (titles of chapters) at the top of the pages. There is also a division according to the Ammonian Sections (in Mark 241 sections), (no references to the Eusebian Canons).

It contains Prolegomena to the four Gospels, Epistula ad Carpianum, pictures, tables of the κεφαλαια (tables of contents) before each Gospel, synaxaria, and Menologion.

== Text ==
The Greek text of the codex is a representative of the Byzantine text-type. Hermann von Soden classified it as a member of the textual family K^{x}. Aland placed it in Category V. According to the Claremont Profile Method it represents the textual family K^{x} in Luke 1 and Luke 20. In Luke 10 no profile was made.

The text of the Pericope Adulterae (John 7:53-8:11) is placed at the end of the Gospel of John.

== History ==
The manuscript once belonged to Basilios Bessarion. According to the inscription it once belonged to A. F. R.

The manuscript was examined by Birch and Burgon. C. R. Gregory saw it in 1886.

It is currently housed at the Biblioteca Marciana (Gr. Z 8), at Venice.

== See also ==
- List of New Testament minuscules
- Biblical manuscript
- Textual criticism
