= Minuscule 401 =

- New Testament manuscript
- Name: Neapolit.
- Text: Gospels †
- Date: 12th century
- Script: Greek
- Now at: Biblioteca Nazionale Vittorio Emanuele III
- Size: 20.5 cm by 9.4 cm
- Type: Byzantine text-type
- Category: V
- Note: marginalia

Minuscule 401 is a Greek minuscule manuscript of the New Testament Gospels, written on parchment. It is designated by the siglum 401 in the Gregory-Aland numbering of New Testament manuscripts, and ε 236 in the von Soden numbering of New Testament manuscripts. Using the study of comparative writing styles (palaeography), it has been dated to the 12th century. The manuscript has complex contents and marginal notes.

== Description ==
The manuscript is a codex (precursor to the modern book format), containing the text of the New Testament Gospels on 113 parchment leaves (sized 20.5 cm by 9.4 cm), with many missing sections. The text is written in one column per page, with 23 lines per page.

Contents
John 1:1-9:5 (missing 9:6-21:25)
Matthew 10:37-42; 11:1-18; 12:11-14:25 (missing 1:1-10:36; 11:19-12:10; 14:26-28:20)
Mark 1:40-16:20
Luke 1:1-24:53

The text is divided according to the chapters (known as κεφαλαια / kephalaia), whose numbers are given in the margin, and their titles (known as τιτλοι / titloi) at the top of the pages. There is also a division according to the smaller Ammonian Sections, but without reference to the Eusebian Canons (both early divisions of the Gospels into sections.).

As the beiginning of all the other Gospels are missing, only one table of contents (also known as κεφαλαια) is present before the Gospel of Luke. Verse totals were added by a later hand.

== Text ==
The Greek text is considered to be a representative of the Byzantine text-type. Biblical scholar Kurt Aland placed it in Category V of his New Testament manuscript classification system. Category V manuscripts are described as "manuscripts with a purely or predominantly Byzantine text."

According to the Claremont Profile Method (a specific analysis of textual data), it has a mixed text in Luke 1. In Luke 10 and Luke 20 it has a mixture of the Byzantine text-type, and creates a pair with minuscule 1013. The text of the Pericope Adulterae (John 7:53-8:11) is omitted.

== History ==
The earliest history of the manuscript is unknown. It was added to the list of New Testament manuscripts by biblical scholar Johann M. A. Scholz (1794–1852). Scholz described it in Biblisch-kritische Reise (p. 135). Biblical scholar Caspar René Gregory saw it in 1886.

It was dated to the 11th or 12th century. It is currently dated by the INTF to the 12th century. The manuscript is currently housed at the Biblioteca Nazionale Vittorio Emanuele III (shelf number Ms. II. A. 3) in Naples.

== See also ==
- List of New Testament minuscules
- Biblical manuscript
- Textual criticism
