= Lectionary 71 =

Greek manuscript of the New Testament

Lectionary ℓ 71
- New Testament manuscript
- Text: Evangelistarion
- Date: 1066
- Script: Greek
- Now at: Bibliothèque nationale de France
- Size: 31.7 cm by 22.8 cm

Lectionary 71, designated by siglum ℓ 71 (in the Gregory-Aland numbering). It is a Greek manuscript of the New Testament, on vellum leaves. It is dated by a colophon to the year 1066.

== Description ==
The codex contains Lessons from the Gospels of John, Matthew, Luke lectionary (Evangelistarium) with some lacunae supplemented on paper. It is written in Greek minuscule letters, on 159 parchment leaves (31.7 cm by 22.8 cm), 2 columns per page, 25-27 lines per page. It contains subscriptions.

== History ==
The manuscript was written by presbyter John for monk Georg.

It was partially examined by Scholz. It was examined and described by Paulin Martin and Henri Omont.

The manuscript is not cited in the critical editions of the Greek New Testament (UBS3).

Currently the codex is located in the Bibliothèque nationale de France (Gr. 289) in Paris.

== See also ==
- List of New Testament lectionaries
- Biblical manuscript
- Textual criticism

== Bibliography ==
- Henri Omont, Fac-similés des manuscrits grecs dates de la Bibliothèque Nationale du IXe et XIVe siècle (Paris, 1891), 32.
