= Minuscule 407 =

- New Testament manuscript
- Text: Luke 5:30-John 9:2
- Date: 12th century
- Script: Greek
- Now at: Biblioteca Marciana
- Size: 15 cm by 13 cm
- Type: Byzantine text-type
- Category: V
- Note: marginalia

Minuscule 407 (in the Gregory-Aland numbering), ε 320 (in Soden's numbering), is a Greek minuscule manuscript of the New Testament, on parchment. Paleographically it has been assigned to the 12th century. It contains marginalia.

== Description ==
The codex contains the text of the Gospel of Luke 5:30-Gospel of John 9:2 on 87 parchment leaves (15 cm by 13 cm). The text is written in one column per page, in 21 lines per page.

The text is divided according to the κεφαλαια (chapters), whose numbers are given at the margin, with their τιτλοι (titles) at the top of the pages. There is also a division according to the Ammonian Sections, but references to the Eusebian Canons are absent.

It contains tables of the κεφαλαια (tables of contents) before each Gospel, a few lectionary markings in some places at the margin, subscriptions at the end of Luke, numbers of stichoi, numbers of Verses, and pictures.

== Text ==
The Greek text of the codex is a representative of the Byzantine text-type. Hermann von Soden classified it to the textual family K^{x}. Aland placed it in Category V.

According to the Claremont Profile Method it represents K^{x} in Luke 10 and Luke 20. In Luke 1 its text is defective.

The Pericope Adulterae (John 7:53-8:11) is marked with an obelus.

== History ==
Wiedmann and J. G. J. Braun collated portions of the manuscript for Scholz (1794–1852). The manuscript was added to the list of New Testament manuscripts by Scholz. C. R. Gregory saw the manuscript in 1886.

The manuscript is currently housed at the Biblioteca Marciana (Gr. I. 12) in Venice.

== See also ==
- List of New Testament minuscules
- Biblical manuscript
- Textual criticism
