= Minuscule 723 =

- New Testament manuscript
- Text: Gospels
- Date: 15th century
- Script: Greek
- Now at: Austrian National Library
- Size: 26.8 cm by 18.8 cm
- Type: mixed
- Category: none
- Note: –

Minuscule 723 (in the Gregory-Aland numbering), Θ^{ε53} (von Soden), is a Greek minuscule manuscript of the New Testament, on paper. Palaeographically it has been assigned to the 15th century. Scrivener labelled it as 828^{e}.

== Description ==
The codex contains the text of the four Gospels, on 397 paper leaves (size 26.8 cm by 18.8 cm).

The text is written in one column per page, with 38 lines per page.

It contains Prolegomena, Argumentum, tables of the κεφαλαια (tables of contents) with the harmony, subscriptions, numbers of στιχοι, and the numbers of verses in Luke, as well as a commentary of Theophylact.

== Text ==
Kurt Aland did not place the Greek text of the codex in any category. It was not examined using the Claremont Profile Method, and it lacks the Pericope Adulterae (John 7:53-8:11).

== History ==
Gregory dated the manuscript to the 15th century. Currently the manuscript is dated by the INTF to the 15th century.

The manuscript once belonged to Seb. Tengnagel.

It was added to the list of New Testament manuscripts by Scrivener (828) and Gregory (723). Gregory saw the manuscript in 1887.

At present the manuscript is housed at the Austrian National Library (Theol. gr. 122) in Vienna.

== See also ==
- List of New Testament minuscules
- Biblical manuscript
- Textual criticism
