= Lectionary 221 =

Lectionary ℓ 221
- New Testament manuscript
- Text: Evangelistarium
- Date: 15th century
- Script: Greek
- Now at: Orlando, Florida
- Size: 29 cm by 19.2 cm

Lectionary 221, designated by siglum ℓ 221 (in the Gregory-Aland numbering) is a Greek manuscript of the New Testament, on paper. Palaeographically it has been assigned to the 15th century. Scrivener labelled it by 245^{evl}. The manuscript has complex contents.

== Description ==
The codex contains lessons from the Gospels of John, Matthew, Luke lectionary (Evangelistarium), on 156 glazed paper leaves (29 cm by 19.2 cm), with only one lacuna (the first leaf with John 1:1-17 and nine leaves at the end). Nine leaves at the end were supplemented by a later hand.

The text is written in Greek minuscule letters, in two columns per page, 28 lines per page. The titles and capitals in red. The Synaxarion is on a leaf of the binding.

It contains the Pericope Adulterae.

There are weekday Gospel lessons.

== History ==
Scrivener and Gregory dated the manuscript to the 13th century. It has been assigned by the Institute for New Testament Textual Research to the 15th century.

Of the history of the codex nothing is known until the year 1864, when it was in the possession of a dealer at Janina in Epeiros. It was then purchased from him by a representative of Baroness Burdett-Coutts (1814–1906), a philanthropist, along with other Greek manuscripts. They were transported to England in 1870-1871. The manuscript was presented by Burdett-Coutts to Sir Roger Cholmely's School, and was housed at the Highgate (Burdett-Coutts II. 30), in London.

The manuscript was added to the list of New Testament manuscripts by Scrivener (number 245) and Gregory (number 221). Gregory saw it in 1883.

The manuscript was transferred to United States.

The manuscript is not cited in the critical editions of the Greek New Testament (UBS3).

The manuscript is housed at the Scriptorium (VK 1096), Orlando, Florida.

== See also ==
- List of New Testament lectionaries
- Biblical manuscript
- Textual criticism

== Bibliography ==
- Gregory, Caspar René (1900). Textkritik des Neuen Testaments. Vol. 1. Leipzig. p. 405.
