= Minuscule 315 =

- New Testament manuscript
- Text: Gospel of John †
- Date: 13th century
- Script: Greek
- Now at: Bibliothèque nationale de France
- Size: 27.7 cm by 19.4 cm
- Category: none
- Note: commentary

Minuscule 315 (in the Gregory-Aland numbering), Θ^{ε203} (Soden), is a Greek minuscule manuscript of the New Testament, on parchment. Palaeographically it has been assigned to the 13th century.

== Description ==
The codex contains the text of the Gospel of John on 156 parchment leaves (27.7 cm by 19.4 cm) with lacunae (1:1-21; 14:25-15:16; 21:22-25). The text is written in one column per page, in 21-31 lines per page. The biblical text is surrounded by a catena.

Kurt Aland did not place the Greek text of the codex in any Category.

== History ==
The manuscript was added to the list of New Testament manuscripts by Scholz (1794–1852). It was examined and described by Paulin Martin. C. R. Gregory saw it in 1885.

The manuscript is currently housed at the Bibliothèque nationale de France (Gr. 210) in Paris.

== See also ==
- List of New Testament minuscules
- Biblical manuscript
- Textual criticism
