= Lectionary 130 =

Lectionary ℓ 130
- New Testament manuscript
- Text: Evangelistarion
- Date: 10th century
- Script: Greek
- Now at: Vatican Library
- Size: 33.7 cm by 24.3 cm

Lectionary 130, designated by siglum ℓ 130 (in the Gregory-Aland numbering) is a Greek manuscript of the New Testament, on parchment leaves. Palaeographically it has been assigned to the 10th century.

== Description ==
The codex contains lessons from the Gospels of John, Matthew, Luke lectionary (Evangelistarium) with some lacunae at the end. It is written in Greek uncial letters, on two volumes, on 343 parchment leaves (33.7 cm by 24.3 cm). The text is written in two columns per page, 20 lines per page, 9-13 letters per line. The uncial letters are large.

It contains the Pericope Adulterae (John 8:1-11 - not 8:3-11 as usual for lectionaries). It is very beautiful.

== History ==
In 1583 the manuscript belonged to Francesco Accioda in Messina. The manuscript was added to the list of New Testament manuscripts by Scholz. It was examined by Scholz, and Gregory.

The manuscript is not cited in the critical editions of the Greek New Testament (UBS3).

Currently the codex is located in the Vatican Library (Ottob. gr. 2) in Rome.

== See also ==
- List of New Testament lectionaries
- Biblical manuscript
- Textual criticism

== Bibliography ==
- J. M. A. Scholz, Biblisch-kritische Reise in Frankreich, der Schweiz, Italien, Palästine und im Archipel in den Jahren 1818, 1819, 1820, 1821: Nebst einer Geschichte des Textes des Neuen Testaments, p. 104 f.
