= Minuscule 843 =

Mediaeval Greek biblical codex

- New Testament manuscript
- Text: Gospels †
- Date: 12th century
- Script: Greek
- Now at: Biblioteca Nazionale Vittorio Emanuele III
- Size: 16.3 cm by 12 cm
- Type: Byzantine text-type
- Category: V
- Note: —

Minuscule 843 (in the Gregory-Aland numbering), ε237 (von Soden), is a 12th-century Greek minuscule manuscript of the New Testament on parchment. The manuscript is lacunose.

== Description ==
The codex contains the text of the four Gospels on 235 parchment leaves (size 16.3 cm by 12 cm). The leaves 38-41 with text Matthew 15:33-17:18 were supplied in the 14th century. The text is written in one column per page, 24 lines per page. The manuscript is ornamented.

The text is divided according to the κεφαλαια (chapters), whose numbers are given at the margin, and their τιτλοι (titles of chapters) at the top of the pages. There is also a division according to the Ammonian Sections (in Mark 233 Sections, the last in 16:8), with references to the Eusebian Canons.

It contains the Epistula ad Carpianum (no Eusebian Canon tables), Prolegomena, the tables of the κεφαλαια (tables of contents) before each of the Gospels, and lectionary markings.

== Text ==
The Greek text of the codex is a representative of the Byzantine text-type. Hermann von Soden classified it to the textual family K^{x}. Kurt Aland the Greek text of the codex placed in Category V. According to the Claremont Profile Method it represents textual cluster 1167 in Luke 1 and Luke 20. In Luke 10 no profile was made.

The text of the Pericope Adulterae (John 7:53-8:11) is omitted.

== History ==
C. R. Gregory dated the manuscript to the 12th century. Currently the manuscript is dated by the INTF to the 12th century.

The manuscript was added to the list of New Testament manuscripts by Gregory (843^{e}). Gregory saw it in 1886.

Currently the manuscript is housed at the Biblioteca Nazionale Vittorio Emanuele III Ms. II. A. 37), in Naples.

== See also ==
- List of New Testament minuscules
- Biblical manuscript
- Textual criticism
