= Minuscule 564 =

- New Testament manuscript
- Text: Gospels
- Date: 10th century
- Script: Greek
- Now at: University of Leipzig
- Size: 17 cm by 13.3 cm
- Type: Byzantine text-type
- Category: V

Minuscule 564 (in the Gregory-Aland numbering), ε 1026 (in the Soden numbering), is a Greek minuscule manuscript of the New Testament, on parchment. Palaeographically it has been assigned to the 10th century. Scrivener labelled it by number 478. The manuscript has complex contents.

== Description ==
The codex contains a complete text of the four Gospels on 360 parchment leaves (size 17 cm by 13.3 cm). The writing is in one column per page, 21 lines per page. The initial letters are in gold.

The text is divided according to the κεφαλαια (chapters), whose numerals are given at the margin, (not τιτλοι). There is also a division according to the Ammonian Sections (in Mark 236 – 16:12), with references to the Eusebian Canons.

It contains Epistula ad Carpianum, the Eusebian Canon tables, Prolegomena, tables of the κεφαλαια are placed before every Gospel, lectionary markings, liturgical books with hagiographies (Synaxarion and Menologion), subscriptions at the end of each Gospel, and numbers of στιχοι.

== Text ==
The Greek text of the codex is a representative of the Byzantine text-type. Hermann von Soden classified it to the textual family K^{x}. Aland placed it in Category V.

According to the Claremont Profile Method it represents the textual family K^{x} in Luke 1, and Luke 20. In Luke 10 no profile was made.

The Pericope Adulterae (John 7:53–8:11) is placed at the end of John (after 21:25).

== History ==
The manuscript was brought by Constantin von Tischendorf from the East. It was added to the list of the New Testament manuscripts by F. H. A. Scrivener.

Currently the manuscript is housed at the Library of the Leipzig University Library (Cod. Gr. 6).

== See also ==
- List of New Testament minuscules
- Biblical manuscript
- Textual criticism
