= Minuscule 391 =

- New Testament manuscript
- Text: Gospels
- Date: 1055
- Script: Greek
- Now at: Vatican Library
- Size: 29.1 cm by 23.2 cm
- Type: Byzantine text-type
- Category: none
- Note: marginalia

Minuscule 391 (in the Gregory-Aland numbering), A^{128} (Soden), is a Greek minuscule manuscript of the New Testament, on parchment. The text represents the Byzantine textual tradition. It is dated by a colophon to the year 1055. It has marginalia.

== Description ==
The codex contains the text of the four Gospels on 232 parchment leaves (29.1 cm by 23.2 cm) with lacunae (Matthew 1:1-8; Luke 1). It is written in one column per page, in 21 lines per page.

The text is divided according to the κεφαλαια (chapters), whose numbers are given at the margin, and their τιτλοι (titles of chapters) at the top of the pages. There is also a division according to the Ammonian Sections, with references to the Eusebian Canons (written below Ammonian Section numbers).

It contains the Epistula ad Carpianum, Prolegomena, lists of the κεφαλαια (tables of contents) before each Gospel, and a commentary.

== Text ==
The Greek text of the codex is a representative of the Byzantine text-type. Kurt Aland did not place it in any Category.

According to the Claremont Profile Method it represents textual family Π^{a} in some parts (Luke 1; 10) and family K^{x} in Luke 20. It belongs to the cluster 178.

The original codex did not contain the Pericope Adulterae (John 7:53-8:11). It was added in the 15th century.

== History ==
The manuscript is dated by a colophon to the year 1055. It was given to Pope Benedict XIII (1724–1730) by Abbachum Audriani, an abbot of Athos.

The manuscript was added to the list of New Testament manuscripts by Scholz (1794–1852). It was examined and described by Giuseppe Cozza-Luzi. C. R. Gregory saw it in 1886.

The manuscript is currently housed at the Vatican Library (Ottob. gr. 432) in Rome.

== See also ==
- List of New Testament minuscules
- Biblical manuscript
- Textual criticism
