= Minuscule 743 =

- New Testament manuscript
- Text: Gospel of John, 1-3 Epistles of John, Revelation of John
- Date: 14th century
- Script: Greek
- Now at: Bibliothèque nationale de France
- Size: 39.7 cm by 27.7 cm
- Type: ?
- Category: none
- Note: commentary

Minuscule 743 (in the Gregory-Aland numbering), α1401 A^{ν414}N^{ι40} (von Soden), is a Greek minuscule manuscript of the New Testament written on paper. Palaeographically it has been assigned to the 14th century. The manuscript has no complex contents. Scrivener labelled it as 738^{e}.

== Description ==
The codex contains the text of the Gospel of John, 1-3 Epistles of John, Revelation of John on 401 paper leaves (size 39.7 cm by 27.7 cm), with one lacuna (John 21:22-25). According to Gregory it has 406 leaves.

The text is written in one column per page, 35 lines per page. The text is divided according to the κεφαλαια (chapters), whose numbers are given at the margin, with their τιτλοι (titles) at the top of the pages.

It contains lists of the κεφαλαια (lists of contents) before each Gospel, and lectionary markings at the margin.

Gospel of John has a commentary of Nicetas, Revelation of John has a commentary of Andreas. Epistles of John are without a commentary.

== Text ==
Aland the Greek text of the codex did not place in any Category.

In John 2:1 it reads τριτη ημερα (third day) for ημερα τη τριτη (the third day); the reading is supported by manuscripts: Codex Vaticanus, Codex Nanianus, Koridethi, manuscripts of Ferrar Family, minuscule 196.

In John 4:51 it reads υιος (son) for παις (servant), the reading of the codex is supported by Codex Bezae, Codex Cyprius, Codex Petropolitanus Purpureus, Nanianus, Codex Petropolitanus, 0141, 33, 194, 196, 817, 892, 1192, 1216, 1241.

== History ==
F. H. A. Scrivener - followed Martin - dated the manuscript to the 13th century; Gregory dated it to the 14th century. The manuscript is currently dated by the INTF to the 14th century.

The manuscript was added to the list of New Testament manuscripts by Scrivener (738) and Gregory (743). It was examined and described by Paulin Martin. Gregory saw the manuscript in 1885.

Herman C. Hoskier collated text of the Apocalypse. It was examined by J. Schmid.

The manuscript is now housed at the Bibliothèque nationale de France (Suppl. Gr. 159, fol. 2-7.12-406) in Paris.

== See also ==
- List of New Testament minuscules
- Biblical manuscript
- Textual criticism
