= Minuscule 168 =

- New Testament manuscript
- Text: Gospels
- Date: 13th century
- Script: Greek
- Now at: Vatican Library
- Size: 34 cm by 22 cm
- Type: Byzantine text-type
- Category: none
- Note: marginalia

Minuscule 168 (in the Gregory-Aland numbering), Θ^{ε31} (Soden), is a Greek minuscule manuscript of the New Testament, on parchment. Palaeographically it has been assigned to the 13th century. It has marginalia.

== Description ==
The codex contains the text of the four Gospels on 217 thick parchment leaves (size 34 cm by 22 cm), with Theophylact's commentary, and some lacunae (Luke 24:13-53; John 1:1-14). The beginning of the codex was destroyed by humidity.

The text is written in two columns per page, 40 lines per page, in brown-black ink.

The text is divided according to numbers of the κεφαλαια (chapters), whose numbers are given at the margin, and the τιτλοι (titles of chapters) at the top of the pages. There is also a division according to the Ammonian Sections, with references to the Eusebian Canons (written below Ammonian Section numbers).

It contains tables of the κεφαλαια (tables of contents) before each Gospel, the subscriptions at the end of Mark, with numbers of ρηματα, and numbers of στιχοι were added by a later hand.

== Text ==
The Greek text of the codex is a mixture of text-types. Aland did not place it in any Category. According to the Claremont Profile Method it has mixed text in Luke 1, in Luke 10 it has a mixture of the Byzantine text-families. In Luke 20 the manuscript is defective. It has some relationship to cluster 1675 in Luke 1 and to group Λ.

== History ==
The manuscript was examined by Birch (about 1782) and Scholz (1794–1852). C. R. Gregory saw the manuscript in 1886.

It is currently housed at the Vatican Library (Barb. gr. 570), at Rome.

== See also ==
- List of New Testament minuscules
- Biblical manuscript
- Textual criticism
