= Minuscule 799 =

- New Testament manuscript
- Text: Gospels
- Date: 11th century
- Script: Greek
- Now at: National Library of Greece
- Size: 18 cm by 14 cm
- Type: Byzantine text-type
- Category: V
- Note: –

Minuscule 799 (in the Gregory-Aland numbering), ε196 (von Soden), is a Greek minuscule manuscript of the New Testament written on parchment. Palaeographically it has been assigned to the 11th century. The manuscript has complex contents.

== Description ==
The codex contains the text of the four Gospels, on 366 parchment leaves (size 18 cm by 14 cm). The text is written in one column per page, 18-20 lines per page.

The text is divided according to the κεφαλαια (chapters), whose numbers are given at the margin, with their τιτλοι (titles) at the top of the pages (with a Harmony). There is also another division according to the smaller Ammonian Sections (in Mark 234 sections, the last section in 16:9), with references to the Eusebian Canons.

It contains liturgical books: Synaxarion and Menologion, subscriptions at the end of each of the Gospels, and numbers of στιχοι. It contains subscriptions added by a later hand.

== Text ==
The Greek text of the codex is a representative of the Byzantine text-type. Hermann von Soden classified it to the textual family K^{x}. Aland placed it in Category V.

According to the Claremont Profile Method it has mixed text in Luke 1, mixed Byzantine text in Luke 10, and represent the textual family K^{x} in Luke 20. It belongs to the textual subgroup 35.

It lacks Pericope Adulterae (John 7:53-8:11).

== History ==
According to C. R. Gregory the manuscript was written in the 12th century. The manuscript is currently dated by the INTF to the 11th century. The manuscript was bought in 1878 by Gregorius Papadopoulos from Agrypolei.

It was added to the list of New Testament manuscripts by Gregory (799). Gregory saw the manuscript in 1886.

The manuscript is now housed at the National Library of Greece (117) in Athens.

== See also ==
- List of New Testament minuscules
- Biblical manuscript
- Textual criticism
- Minuscule 798
