= Minuscule 367 =

- New Testament manuscript
- Text: New Testament
- Date: 1331
- Script: Greek
- Now at: Laurentian Library
- Size: 24.5 cm by 17.5 cm
- Type: Byzantine
- Category: V
- Note: marginalia

Minuscule 367 (in the Gregory-Aland numbering), δ 400 (Soden), is a Greek minuscule manuscript of the New Testament, on paper. It is dated by a Colophon to the year 1331 (December 26). It has marginalia.

== Description ==
The codex contains entire text of the New Testament on 349 paper leaves (24.5 cm by 17.5 cm). The text is written in one column per page, in 32 lines per page. The biblical text is written in red. It is surrounded by a catena.

The text is divided according to the κεφαλαια (chapters), whose numbers are given at the margin, and their τιτλοι (titles of chapters) at the top of the pages. The text of the Gospels is also divided according to the smaller Ammonian Sections (in Mark 234 Sections - 16:9), (without references to the Eusebian Canons).

It contains Prolegomena, tables of the κεφαλαια (tables of contents) before each book, lectionary markings at the margin, subscriptions at the end of each book, numbers of στιχοι, synaxaria, and Menologion.

Order of books: Gospels, Acts, Pauline epistles, Catholic epistles, and Revelation of John.

== Text ==
The Greek text of the codex is a representative of the Byzantine text-type. Hermann von Soden classified it to the textual family K^{x}. Aland placed it in Category V. According to the Claremont Profile Method it represents textual family K^{x} in Luke 1 and Luke 20. In Luke 10 no profile was made.

The Pericope Adulterae (John 7:53-8:11) is marked by an obelus.

== History ==
The manuscript was written by one Mark in 1331. It was bought in 1482 and came to Florence. It once belonged to the congregation of the St. Justina.

The manuscript was added to the list of New Testament manuscripts by Scholz (1794-1852). It was examined by Burgon. C. R. Gregory saw the manuscript in 1886.

The manuscript is currently housed at the Biblioteca Laurentiana (Conv. Soppr. 53) in Florence.

== See also ==
- List of New Testament minuscules
- Biblical manuscript
- Textual criticism
