= Nicetas of Heraclea =

11th century Greek bishop

Nicetas
- Νικήτας
- Occupation: Clergyman

Nicetas (Νικήτας) was an 11th-century Greek clergyman. A deacon of St. Sophia, Constantinople, he was a nephew of the bishop of Serres or Serrae in Macedonia. Eventually he became Metropolitan of Heraclea (Pontus), at the end of the eleventh century. He was a prolific writer.

He is sometimes confused with Nicetas Paphlagon.

== Works ==
He compiled catenas on Matthew, Luke and John.

1. Commentarii in Gregor. Nazianzeni Tetrasticha et Monosticha
2. Responsa Canonica ad Interrogationes cujusdam Constantini Episcopi
