= Paulin Martin =

French Catholic Biblical scholar

Jean-Pierre-Paulin Martin (Note: Sometimes referred to as Jean P.P. Martin.) (20 July 1840 at Lacam-d'Ourcet, Lot – 14 January 1890 at Amélie-les-Bains, Pyrénées-Orientales), often referred to as Abbé Paulin Martin, or simply Abbé Martin or Paulin Martin, was a French Catholic Biblical scholar.

== Life ==
Paulin Martin's secondary studies were made at Montfaucon, and his theology at St. Sulpice. Here came under the influence of Le Hir. At the end of his course, Martin was too young for ordination; so he went to the French Seminary, Rome, attended the lectures at the Gregorian University, and was raised to the priesthood in 1863.

He remained in Rome until 1868, obtained a doctorate in sacred theology and licentiate in canon law and started his life study in Semitic languages. He worked chiefly at Hebrew, Syriac, Aramaic, and Arabic. It was as a Syriac scholar that he first attracted attention.

Martin was in France ten years, as curate in various parishes of Paris, before his appointment to the chair of Sacred Scripture and Semitic languages in the Institut Catholique de Paris, which he filled from 1878 to 1890.

== Works ==
The time of literary activity of Abbé Martin was the twelve years of his professorship at the Institut. It included:

- lithographed lectures delivered from 1882-1886: "Introduction à la critique textuelle du N.T., partie thé" (Paris 1882-1883);
- a supplement thereto, "Description technique des manuscrits grecs relatifs au Nouveau Testament, conservés dans les bibliothèques des Paris" (Paris 1883)
- "Introduction à la critique textuelle du Nouveau Testament, partie pratique" (4 vols., Paris, 1884–86). These four volumes contain studies in the ancient manuscripts of the New Testament, the authenticity and historicity of disputed fragments of the new testament - notably the ending of Mark, the bloody sweat, the woman taken in adultery, the three heavenly witnesses. In regard to this last fragment he carried on a controversy with MM Vacant, Maunoury, and Rambouillet in the "Revue des sciences ecclé" (1887–1889) and in "La Controverse" (1888).
- Les origines de l'église d'Édesse et des églises syriennes, (Paris 1889)

Earlier writings were:

- Martin, Jean-Pierre-Paulin, ed. (1872). Oeuvres grammaticales d'Abou'lfaradj dit Bar Hebreus. Vol. 1. Paris: Maisonneuve.
- Martin, Jean-Pierre-Paulin, ed. (1872). Oeuvres grammaticales d'Abou'lfaradj dit Bar Hebreus. Vol. 2. Paris: Maisonneuve.
- Martin, Jean-Pierre-Paulin (1872). "Syriens orientaux et occidentaux: Essai sur les deux principaux dialectes araméens". Journal Asiatique. 6 (19): 305–483.
- "Grammatica chrestomathia, et glossarium linguæ syriacæ" (Paris, 1873);
- "Histoire de la Ponctuation ou de la massore chez les Syriens" (Paris, 1875).

In addition he published a general introduction to the Bible (Paris, 1887–89).

== See also ==
- Comma Johanneum

== Sources ==
- The entry cites:
  - Eugène Mangenot, M. l'abbé Paulin Martin in Revue des sciences ecclésiastiques (1891).
