= Minuscule 571 =

- New Testament manuscript
- Text: Gospels †
- Date: 12th century
- Script: Greek
- Now at: Russian National Library
- Size: 22.6 cm by 17 cm
- Type: Byzantine
- Category: V

Minuscule 571 (in the Gregory-Aland numbering), ε 1294 (in the Soden numbering), is a Greek minuscule manuscript of the New Testament, on parchment. Palaeographically it has been assigned to the year 12th century. It was labeled by Scrivener as 474. The manuscript is lacunose.

== Description ==
The codex contains the text of the four Gospels on 194 parchment leaves (size 22.6 cm by 17 cm) with lacunae (John 7:1-21:25). The writing is in one column per page, 22-24 lines per page. It contains the Eusebian tables at the beginning of the manuscript, the tables of the κεφαλαια are placed before each of the Gospels, the Ammonian sections, the Eusebian Canons, lectionary markings, and pictures of the four Evangelists.

== Text ==
The Greek text of the codex is a representative of the Byzantine text-type. Hermann von Soden classified it to the textual family K^{x}. Aland placed it in Category V. According to the Claremont Profile Method it represents K^{x} in Luke 10 and Luke 20. In Luke 1 it has mixed Byzantine text.

== History ==
The manuscript was examined and described by Pogodin and Eduard de Muralt (along with the codices 565-566, 568-570, 572, 574, 575, and 1567), who made first collation of its text. The manuscript was more thoroughly examined by Kurt Treu.

Currently the manuscript is housed at the National Library of Russia (Gr. 98) in Saint Petersburg.

== See also ==
- List of New Testament minuscules
- Biblical manuscript
- Textual criticism
