= Minuscule 569 =

- New Testament manuscript
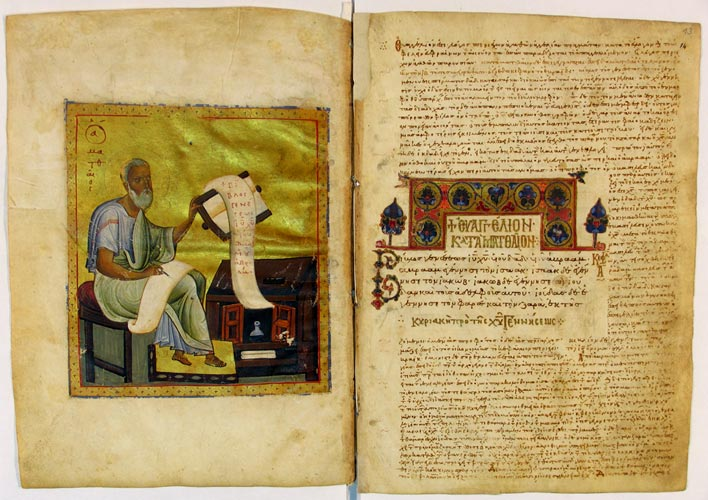
- Portrait of Matthew Evangelist and the first page of the Gospel of Matthew
- Text: Gospels
- Date: 1061
- Script: Greek
- Now at: Russian National Library
- Size: 26.2 cm by 19.3 cm
- Type: Byzantine / mixed
- Category: none

Minuscule 569 is a Greek minuscule illuminated manuscript Gospel book, written on parchment. It is designated by the siglum 569. in the Gregory-Aland numbering of New Testament manuscripts, and as A^{151} in the von Soden numbering of New Testament manuscripts. It is dated by a Colophon to the year 1061. It was labelled by Biblical scholar Frederick H. A. Scrivener as 475. The manuscript has complex contents.

== Description ==
The manuscript is a codex (precursor to the modern book format), containing the complete text of the four Gospels written on 358 parchment leaves (sized 26.2 cm by 19.3 cm). The writing is in one column per page, 14 lines per page for the main text, and 51 lines for the surrounding commentary. It includes breathing marks, sign of the interrogative, with frequent abbreviations; iota adscript occurs several times (e.g. τῶι for τῷ), it has some iotacistic errors; and avoid hiatus (e.g. ἐγέννησε τὸν).

Some initial letters are in gold ink or another colour. It contains ornamented canon tables; a table of contents (known as κεφαλαια / kephalaia) are placed before each Gospel; the chapter numerals (also known as κεφαλαια) are written in the margin, with their titles (known as τιτλοι / titloi) written at the top of the pages. Also included are a "hypothesis" (explanatory of using of the Eusebian Canons), the number of lines (known as στιχοι / stichoi), Prolegomena (introductions), lectionary markings, a Synaxarion and Menologion, four Evangelist portraits, and decorative head-pieces (in four colours). The biblical text is surrounded by a patristic commentary (known as a catena); in the Gospel of Mark it is a commentary by Victorinus of Pettau. There is additional material from Epiphanius of Salamis.

== Text ==
The Greek text of the codex is considered to be a representative of the Byzantine text-type, with some non-majority readings. Biblical scholar Kurt Aland did not place it in any Category of his New Testament manuscript classification system.

According to the Claremont Profile Method (a specific analysis of textual data), it represents the textual M27 group in Luke 1, Luke 10, and Luke 20. Other manuscripts in this textual group are the minuscules 71, 692, and 750, with Minuscule 1170 being the closest to minuscule 569.

== History ==
The manuscript was completed on 1 November 1061, by an unknown scribe. On the front side of folio 5, a scribe named Eugenius notes that in 1757 the manuscript was bought from Sophronius, a monk, in exchange for a promise to erect a chapel in honour of Saint Spyridon in the monastery of Saint Paul in Bulgaria.

Ἔτει αψνξ (1757) ἀπὸ χριστοῦ τήνδε τὴν βίβλον ἐκτησάμην ἀντ’ αὐτης οἰκοδομἦσαι ὑποσχόμενος τῷ δόντι μοι αὐτὴν Σοφρονίῳ ἱερομονάχῳ παρακκλ..... ἐν τῇ κέλλῃ αὐτοῦ τῇ κατὰ τὴν ..... τοῦ ἁγίου Παύλου ἐπονόματι τοῦ θαυματόυργου Σπυρίδωνος Εὐγένιος ἱεροδίακονος ὁ Βόλγαρις

Afterwards the manuscript belonged to the Załuski Library. The whole collection was dispatched to Saint Petersburg in 1794. It has been held in the Imperial Public Library in Saint Petersburg since 1805. The manuscript was examined and briefly described by librarian and palaeographer Eduard de Muralt (along with the codices 565-566, 568, 570-572, 574, 575, and 1567), but he did not collate any of its readings.

Classical philologist Kurt Treu examined the manuscript more thoroughly in 1966 for the needs of textual criticism. The manuscript is housed in the National Library of Russia (shelf number Gr. 72) in Saint Petersburg.

== See also ==
- Minuscule 570
- Minuscule 568
- List of New Testament minuscules
- Biblical manuscript
- Textual criticism
