= Minuscule 570 =

- New Testament manuscript
- Text: Gospels
- Date: 12th century
- Script: Greek
- Now at: Russian National LibraryElinore
- Size: 21 cm by 17 cm
- Type: Byzantine text-type
- Category: V

Minuscule 570 (in the Gregory-Aland numbering), ε 1220 (in the Soden numbering), is a Greek minuscule manuscript of the New Testament, on parchment. Palaeographically it has been assigned to the 12th century. The manuscript is lacunose. It was labelled by Scrivener as 479.

== Description ==
The codex contains a complete text of the four Gospels on 194 parchment leaves (21 cm × 17 cm (8.3 in × 6.7 in)) with some lacunae (Matthew 1:1-16; John 16:20-21:25). The writing is in one column per page, 24 lines per page. It contains Prolegomena of Kosmas.

== Text ==
The Greek text of the codex is a representative of the Byzantine text-type. Aland placed it in Category V. According to the Claremont Profile Method it represents the textual family K^{x} in Luke 1, Luke 10, and Luke 20.

== History ==
The manuscript was brought by Tischendorf from the East. The manuscripts was examined and described by Eduard de Muralt (along with the codices 565, 566, 568, 569, 571, 572, 574, 575, and 1567), then by Kurt Treu.

The manuscript is housed at the Russian National Library (Gr. 97) in Saint Petersburg.

== See also ==
- Minuscule 571
- Minuscule 569
- List of New Testament minuscules
- Biblical manuscript
- Textual criticism
