= Uncial 067 =

- New Testament manuscript
- Text: Matthew 14; Mark 9, 14
- Date: 6th century
- Script: Greek
- Found: Sinai
- Now at: Russian National Library
- Size: 20 x 15.5 cm
- Type: mixed
- Category: III

Uncial 067 (in the Gregory-Aland numbering), ε 2 (Soden), is a Greek uncial manuscript of the New Testament, dated paleographically to the 6th century.

== Description ==
The codex contains a small part of the Matthew 14; Mark 9, 14, on 6 parchment leaves (20 cm by 15.5 cm). The text is written in two columns per page, 24 lines per page. It is a palimpsest, the upper text was written in the 10th century it contains Georgian calendar.

The text of this codex contains:

Matthew 14:13-16.19-23; 24:37-25:1.32-45; 26:31-45; Mark 9:14-22; 14:58-70.

The Greek text of this codex is mixed, with a strong element of the Byzantine text-type. Aland placed it in Category III.

== History ==
Currently the manuscript is dated by the INTF to the 6th century.

Probably it was brought from Sinai. It was examined by Eduard de Muralt and Kurt Treu.

It is currently housed at the Russian National Library (Suppl. Gr. 6 III, fol. 8-9) in Saint Petersburg.

== See also ==
- List of New Testament uncials
- Biblical manuscript
- Textual criticism
- Uncial 0321
- Uncial 0322
