= Lectionary 251 =

Lectionary ℓ 251
- New Testament manuscript
- Text: Evangelistarium
- Date: 10th century
- Script: Greek
- Now at: Russian National Library
- Size: 29.2 cm by 21.8 cm

Lectionary 251, designated by siglum ℓ 251 (in the Gregory-Aland numbering), is a Greek manuscript of the New Testament, on parchment. Palaeographically it has been assigned to the 10th century. Scrivener labelled it as 195^{evl}.

== Description ==
The codex contains lessons from the Gospels lectionary (Evangelistarium), on 251 parchment leaves (29.2 cm by 21.8 cm). It contains texts of the Gospel of John.

The text is written in Greek large minuscule letters, in two columns per page, 26 lines per page. It has breathings and accents; error of itacism is rare.

== History ==
Scrivener and Gregory dated the manuscript to the 10th century, de Muralt to the 9th or 10th century. It has been assigned by the Institute for New Testament Textual Research to the 10th century.

The manuscript was examined and described by Zalousky and Eduard de Muralt.

The manuscript was added to the list of New Testament manuscripts by Scrivener (number 195) and Gregory (number 251).

The manuscript is not cited in the critical editions of the Greek New Testament (UBS3).

The codex is housed at the Russian National Library (Gr. 56) in Saint Petersburg.

== See also ==
- List of New Testament lectionaries
- Biblical manuscript
- Textual criticism
- Lectionary 250

== Bibliography ==
- Eduard de Muralt, Catalogue des manuscrits grecs de la Bibliothèque Impériale publique (Petersburg 1864), p. 32 (as LVI)
