= Uncial 0321 =

- New Testament manuscript
- Text: Gospel of Matthew †
- Date: 5th-century
- Script: Greek
- Found: Sinai
- Now at: Russian National Library
- Size: 20 × 15.5 cm (7.9 × 6.1 in)
- Type: mixed
- Category: III

Uncial 0321 (in the Gregory-Aland numbering), ε 2 (Soden), is a Greek uncial manuscript of the New Testament, dated paleographically to the 5th-century. The manuscript has survived in very fragmentary condition.

== Description ==
The codex contains a small part of the Gospel of Matthew 14:13-16.19-23; 24:37-25:1.32-45 on 3 parchment leaves of size 20 × 15.5 cm (7.9 × 6.1 in). The text is written in two columns per page, 27 lines per page.

The uncial letters are written separately, without breathings (rough breathing, smooth breathing) and accents. The initial letters are written on the margin. There is a punctuation and signs of interrogative. It does not use Iota subscriptum. The errors of itacism occur rarely, it uses N ephelkystikon, the abbreviations are used rarely. The text is divided according to the κεφαλαια (chapters), whose numbers are given at the margin.

It is a palimpsest, the upper text was written in the 10th century in Georgian language it contains calendar.

The Greek text of this codex is mixed, influenced by the Byzantine text-type. Aland and Barbara Aland placed it in Category III.

== History ==
The manuscript is dated on the palaeographical ground to the 5th-century. Probably it was brought from Sinai by Constantin von Tischendorf. Gregory catalogued it as Uncial 067 on his list. After re-examination made by Pasquale Orsini it is clear that it is different manuscript. In 2010 it was catalogued by the INTF separately as 0321.

The manuscript was examined by Tischendorf, who edited its text in 1846. It was also examined and described by Eduard de Muralt, Kurt Treu, and recently by Pasquale Orsini.

It is currently housed at the Russian National Library (Suppl. Gr. 6 III, fol. 10-12) in Saint Petersburg.

== See also ==
- List of New Testament uncials
- Biblical manuscript
- Textual criticism
- Uncial 0322
