= Lectionary 1386 =

Lectionary ℓ 13886
- New Testament manuscript
- Text: Evangelistarium
- Date: 10th century
- Script: Greek
- Now at: State Historical Museum
- Size: 22.5 cm by 15.5 cm

Lectionary 1386, designated by siglum ℓ 1386 (in the Gregory-Aland numbering) is a Greek manuscript of the New Testament, on parchment. Palaeographically it has been assigned to the 10th century. The manuscript has survived on only two leaves.

== Description ==
The codex contains lessons from the Gospels lectionary (Evangelistarium).

The text is written in Greek uncial letters, on 2 parchment leaves (22.5 cm by 15.5 cm), in two columns per page, 28 lines per page.

== History ==
It has been assigned by the Institute for New Testament Textual Research to the 10th century.

The manuscript was examined and described by Matthaei (Notitia, 1805, p. 194), Guglielmo Cavallo.

The manuscript was added to the list of New Testament manuscripts by Gregory (number 242). It was renumbered into 1386.

The manuscript is not cited in the critical editions of the Greek New Testament (UBS3).

The codex is housed at the State Historical Museum (V. 185, S. 313, fol. 238.239) in Moscow.

== See also ==
- List of New Testament lectionaries
- Biblical manuscript
- Textual criticism
- Lectionary 243
- Lectionary 244

== Bibliography ==
- Guglielmo Cavallo, Ricerche sulla maiuscola biblica (Florence 1967), p. 115
