= Lectionary 244 =

Lectionary ℓ 244
- New Testament manuscript
- Text: Evangelistarium
- Date: 9th century
- Script: Greek
- Now at: Russian National Library
- Size: 12 cm by 9.5 cm

Lectionary 244, designated by siglum ℓ 244 (in the Gregory-Aland numbering) is a Greek manuscript of the New Testament, on parchment. Palaeographically it has been assigned to the 9th century. The manuscript has survived on only one leaf.

== Description ==
The codex contains lessons from the Gospels lectionary (Evangelistarium), it contains only fragments of two lessons with the texts of Luke 1:24-27 and Matthew 20:10-29.

The text is written in Greek uncial letters, on 1 parchment leaf (12 cm by 9.5 cm), in two columns per page, 26 lines per page.

It uses breathings, accents, punctuation, and interrogative sign; iota subscript occurs, errors of itacism. The nomina sacra are written in an abbreviated way.

== History ==
It has been assigned by the Institute for New Testament Textual Research (INTF) to the 9th century.

Constantin von Tischendorf brought the manuscript from the East and gave first description of the codex. It was examined by Eduard de Muralt.

The manuscript was added to the list of New Testament manuscripts by Gregory (number 244).

The manuscript is not cited in the critical editions of the Greek New Testament (UBS3).

The codex is housed at the Russian National Library (Gr. 35) in Saint Petersburg.

== See also ==
- List of New Testament lectionaries
- Biblical manuscript
- Textual criticism
- Lectionary 243
- Lectionary 245

== Bibliography ==
- Constantin von Tischendorf, Anecdota sacra et profana, XIV p. 12
- Eduard de Muralt, Catalogue des manuscrits grecs de la Bibliothèque Impériale publique (Petersburg 1864), p. 21 (as XXXV)
