= Lectionary 257 =

Lectionary ℓ 257
- New Testament manuscript
- Text: Apostolarium
- Date: 1305/1306
- Script: Greek
- Found: 1874
- Now at: British Library
- Size: 28.3 cm by 22 cm

Lectionary 257, designated by siglum ℓ 257 (in the Gregory-Aland numbering) is a Greek manuscript of the New Testament, on parchment. It is dated by a colophon to 1305 or 1306. Scrivener labelled it as 69^{a}, Gregory by 81^{a}. The manuscript has survived in a fragmentary condition.

== Description ==
The codex contains lessons from the Acts of the Apostles and Epistles lectionary (Apostolarium), on 178 parchment leaves (28.3 cm by 22 cm), with numerous lacunae.

The text is written in Greek large minuscule letters, in one column per page, 28-29 lines per page. It contains Synaxarion.

== History ==
According to the colophon it was written in 1305 or 1306 by Ignatius, a scribe.

The manuscript was brought of Nicolas Parassoh on 27 June 1874.

The manuscript was added to the list of New Testament manuscripts by Scrivener (number 69^{a}) and Gregory (number 81^{a}). Gregory saw the manuscript in 1883.

The manuscript is not cited in the critical editions of the Greek New Testament (UBS3).

Currently the codex is housed at the British Library (Add MS 29714) in London.

== See also ==
- List of New Testament lectionaries
- Biblical manuscript
- Textual criticism
- Lectionary 259

== Bibliography ==
- Gregory, Caspar René (1900). Textkritik des Neuen Testaments. Vol. 1. Leipzig: J.C. Hinrichs. p. 469.
- A. Turyn, Dated Greek Manuscripts of the Thirteenth and Fourteenth Centuries in the Libraries of Great Britain, Dumbarton Oaks Series XVII, (Washington, D. C., 1980), 6, p. 69
