= Trebizond Gospel =

Lectionary ℓ 243
- New Testament manuscript
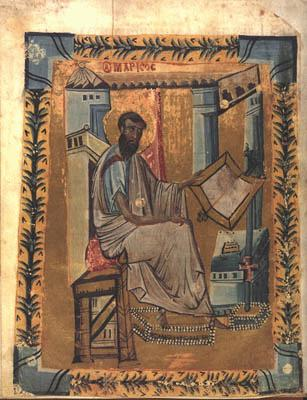
- Illumination representing Mark the Evangelist
- Text: Gospels
- Date: 11th century
- Script: Greek
- Now at: Russian National Library
- Size: 33 by 36.5 cm

Trebizond Gospel, ℓ 243 (in the Gregory-Aland numbering), is a Byzantine illuminated manuscript with the text of Gospel Lectionary, dating palaeographically to the 11th century, with 15 parchment leaves (33 by 36.5 cm) from the 10th century or earlier.

The manuscript is thought to have been created in Constantinople, probably commissioned by a Byzantine Emperor. The book was later decorated with gold and jewels by Andronicus II of Trebizond (reigned 1263 – 1266). In 1858, the manuscript was presented by the Orthodox Metropolitan of Trebizond as a gift to Alexander II of Russia, who in turn donated it to the Imperial Russian National Library. It is still held in that library.

== Description ==
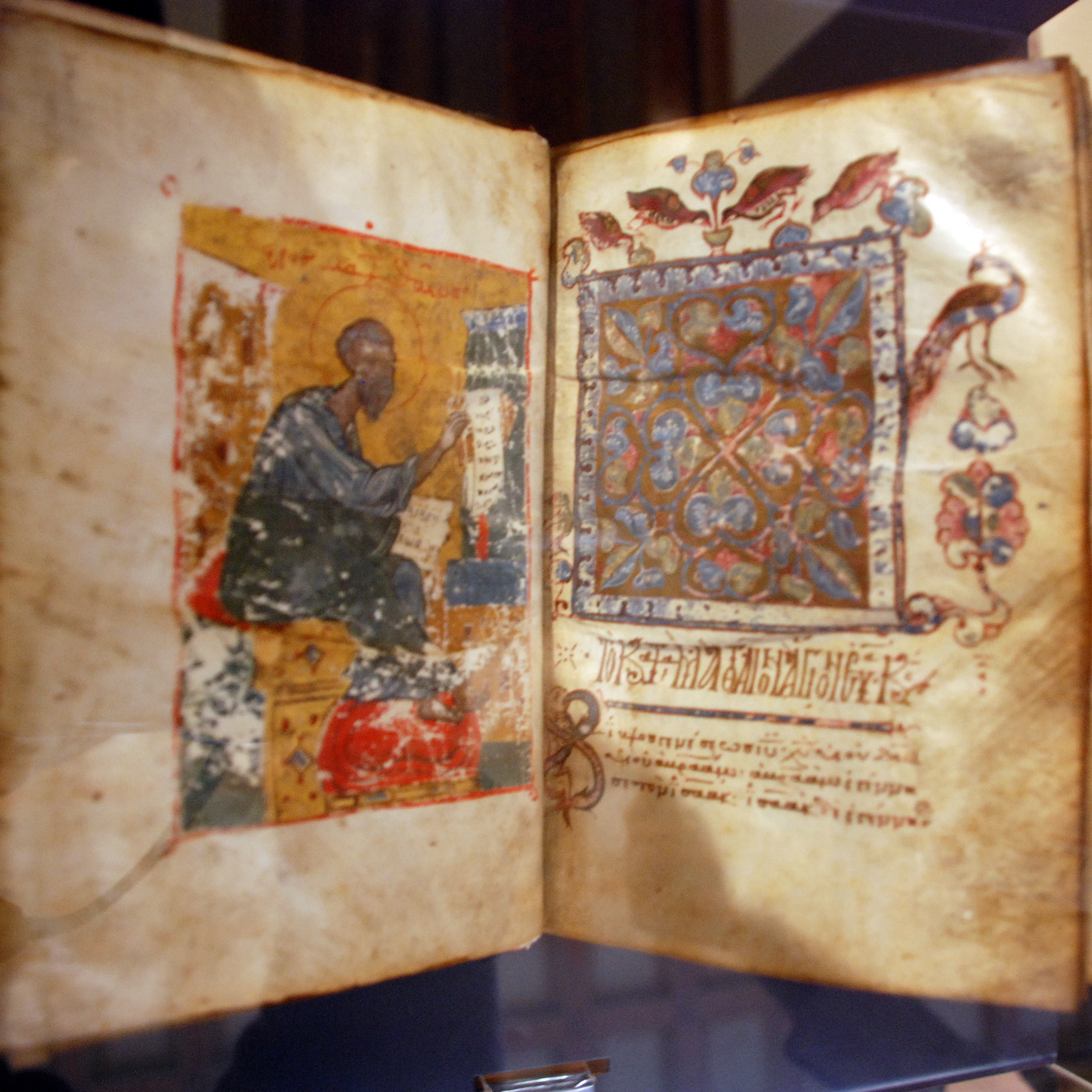
Trebizond gospel

The text is written in two columns per page, 18 lines per page in uncial letters. It contains 15 pictures. It is not known where it was created due to its colophon being lost. Originally it was believed to have originated from the eastern provinces of the Byzantine Empire but later Russian analysis placed it as being from Constantinople due to the art style. It combined Greek illustrations with Armenian pigments. It is believed to have been a commission from the Byzantine Emperor due to the level of detail within it. The Canon tables within it are made distinct from each other, with elaborate designs of flowers and peacocks across the pages of the Gospel. Though the Gospel still portrays the Four Evangelists as being together in a single folio to demonstrate the harmony of the four Gospel accounts.

The book was richly decorated with gold and jewels by the Trapezuntine Emperor Andronicus. In 1858, the Trebizond Gospel was presented by the Orthodox Metropolitan of Trebizond to the Emperor Alexander II of Russia, who donated it to the Imperial Russian National Library, where is held to the present day (Codex Gr. 21, 21a).

It was examined and described by Eduard de Muralt. The manuscript is not cited in the critical editions of the Greek New Testament (UBS3), because of its small textual value.

== See also ==
- List of New Testament lectionaries
- Lectionary 244
- Lectionary 245
