= Minuscule 572 =

- New Testament manuscript
- Text: Gospel of Mark 8:3-9:50
- Date: 12th century
- Script: Greek
- Now at: Russian National Library
- Size: 19 cm by 15 cm
- Type: mixed
- Category: none

Minuscule 572 (in the Gregory-Aland numbering), ε 1221 (in the Soden numbering), is a Greek minuscule manuscript of the New Testament, on parchment. Palaeographically it has been assigned to the 12th century. It was labeled by Scrivener as 480. The manuscript has not complex contents.

== Description ==
The codex contains the text of the Gospel of Mark 8:3-9:50 on 19 parchment leaves (size 19 cm by 15 cm). The writing is in one column per page, 12 lines per page. After every word there is a dot.

== Text ==
Aland did not place the text of the codex in any Category.

== History ==
The manuscript was brought from the Sinai Peninsula by Constantin von Tischendorf.

The manuscript was examined and described by Eduard de Muralt (along with the codices 565-566, 568, 570-571, 574, 575, and 1567), who did not examine any of its readings, then by Kurt Treu.

The manuscript belonged to the same codex as 1231, still housed at the Saint Catherine's Monastery (Gr. 194, 58 fol.).

Currently the manuscript is housed at the National Library of Russia (Gr. 91, fol. 19) in Saint Petersburg.

== See also ==
- List of New Testament minuscules
- Biblical manuscript
- Textual criticism
