= Lectionary 248 =

Lectionary ℓ 248
- New Testament manuscript
- Text: Evangelistarium
- Date: 9th century
- Script: Greek
- Now at: Russian National Library
- Size: 27.2 cm by 20 cm

Lectionary 248, designated by siglum ℓ 248 (in the Gregory-Aland numbering) is a Greek manuscript of the New Testament, on parchment. Palaeographically it has been assigned to the 9th century.

== Description ==
The codex contains lessons from the Gospels lectionary (Evangelistarium). It contains texts of the Gospel of Luke and Matthew.

The text is written in Greek large uncial letters, on 6 parchment leaves (27.2 cm by 20 cm), in two columns per page, 22 lines.

== History ==
It has been assigned by the Institute for New Testament Textual Research to the 9th century.

The manuscript was examined and described by Eduard de Muralt.

The manuscript was added to the list of New Testament manuscripts by Gregory (number 248).

The manuscript is not cited in the critical editions of the Greek New Testament (UBS3).

The codex is housed at the Russian National Library (Gr.43) in Saint Petersburg.

== See also ==
- List of New Testament lectionaries
- Biblical manuscript
- Textual criticism
- Lectionary 247

== Bibliography ==
- Eduard de Muralt, Catalogue des manuscrits grecs de la Bibliothèque Impériale publique (Petersburg 1864), p. 24 (as XLIII)
