= Codex Sangermanensis =

Uncial 0319
- New Testament manuscript
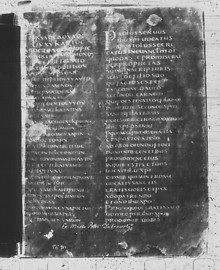
- Romans 1:1-18
- Name: Sangermanensis
- Sign: D^{abs1} or g^{1}
- Text: Paul
- Date: c. 900
- Script: Greek/Latin
- Now at: National Library of Russia, Petersburg
- Size: 36 × 27.5 cm (14.2 × 10.8 in)
- Type: Western
- Category: II
- Hand: coarse, large, thick
- Note: copy of Claromontanus

Codex Sangermanensis designated by D^{abs1} or 0319 (in the numbering Gregory-Aland), α 1027 (Soden), is a tenth-century diglot manuscript, formerly in the library of St. Germain des Prés, Paris, hence its name Sangermanensis, "of Saint Germanus". Now it is preserved in the Bibliothèque nationale, Number 11105 Fonds Latin. It contains the Pauline Epistles, lacking most of 1 Timothy and parts of Romans and Hebrews. It is particularly notable as one of the two such copies which display clear evidence of having had Claromontanus as exemplar (another is Uncial 0320). It is now part of the National Library of Russia (Gr. 20) collection in Saint Petersburg.

== Description ==
Because it is a diglot, Sangermanensis is also valuable for the study of the Latin bibles, namely the Vetus Latina.

It contains 177 parchment leaves of size 36 × 27.5 cm (14.2 × 10.8 in). It is written in two columns per page, 31 lines per page. Codex Sangermanensis was composed in a coarse, large, thick hand.

The Greek text of the codex is a representative of the Western text-type. Kurt Aland (Aland's Profile 51^{1} 12^{1/2} 11^{2} 74^{S}) placed it in Category II.

Textual variants
Romans 13:1 εξουσιαι for εξουσια
Romans 15:14 αδελφοι μου

== History ==
The manuscript was written by Latin scribe, who was unfamiliar with Greek.

The manuscript was examined and described by Bernard de Montfaucon, Johann Jakob Wettstein, Giuseppe Bianchini, and Johann Jakob Griesbach, who designated it by siglum E. In 1805 it was collated by Matthaei.

The manuscript was held in the St. Germain des Prés at Paris. The St. Germain Library suffered severely during the French Revolution, and Peter Dubrovsky, Secretary to the Russian Embassy at Paris, acquired this manuscript together with many other manuscripts stolen from the ecclesiastical libraries.

== See also ==
Sortable lists

- List of New Testament uncials
- List of New Testament Latin manuscripts

Related articles

- Codex Claromontanus
- Textual criticism
