= Lectionary 258 =

Lectionary ℓ 258
- New Testament manuscript
- Text: Evangelistarium
- Date: 13th century
- Script: Greek
- Now at: Russian National Library
- Size: 23.3 cm by 18.3 cm

Lectionary 258, designated by siglum ℓ 258 (in the Gregory-Aland numbering) is a Greek manuscript of the New Testament, on parchment. Palaeographically it has been assigned to the 13th century. Scrivener labelled it as 197^{evl}. Only four leaves of the manuscript have survived.

== Description ==
The codex contains lessons from the Gospels and from the rest of the New Testament lectionary (Evangelistarium), on 4 parchment leaves (23.3 cm by 18.3 cm), with numerous lacunae. It contains lessons Matthew 28:12–18; Luke 4:16–22; John 10:9–14; 19:6.9–11.14–20.25–28.30-35.

The text is written in Greek large minuscule letters, in two columns per page, 20 lines per page. It has errors of itacism; abbreviations in a large number are used in the codex.

== History ==
De Muralt dated the manuscript to the 13th century. Scrivener to the 11th, and Gregory dated the manuscript to the 13th century. It has been assigned by the INTF to the 13th century.

The manuscript was examined and described by Eduard de Muralt.

The manuscript was added to the list of New Testament manuscripts by Scrivener (number 197) and Gregory (number 258).

The manuscript is not cited in the critical editions of the Greek New Testament (UBS3).

The codex is housed at the Russian National Library (Gr. 111) in Saint Petersburg.

== See also ==
- List of New Testament lectionaries
- Biblical manuscript
- Textual criticism
- Lectionary 256

== Bibliography ==
- Eduard de Muralt, Catalogue des manuscrits grecs de la Bibliothèque Impériale publique (Petersburg 1864), p. 64 (as CXI)
