= Pasquale Orsini =

Italian paleographer

Pasquale Orsini (born 1970) is an Italian palaeographer, librarian, and Professor from Università di Catania-Siracusa.

== Life ==
Orsini studied at the Sapienza University of Rome. He was a pupil of prof. Guglielmo Cavallo. He works at the Università di Catania-Siracusa. In 2004 he became a member of the Associazione Italiana Manoscritti Datati.

He examined and described Uncial 059, 082, 0321, and manuscripts housed in the Biblioteca Malatestiana, in Cesena.

== Works ==
- Manoscritti in maiuscola biblica. Materiali per un aggiornamento, Cassino, Edizioni dell'Università degli Studi di Cassino, 2005 (Collana scientifica, Studi Archeologici, Artistici, Filologici, Letterari e Storici, 7).
- Pasquale Orsini, P. Radiciotti, I frammenti della Qubbat al-khazna di Damasco. A proposito di una scoperta sottovalutata, "Nea Rhome" 5 (2008), pp. 45–74.
