= Lectionary 255 =

Lectionary ℓ 255
- New Testament manuscript
- Text: Evangelistarium
- Date: 11th
- Script: Greek–Arabic
- Now at: Russian National Library
- Size: 27 cm by 21.5 cm

Lectionary 255, designated by siglum ℓ 255 (in the Gregory-Aland numbering) is a Greek–Arabic manuscript of the New Testament, on parchment. Palaeographically it has been assigned to the 11th century.

== Description ==
The codex contains lessons from the Gospels lectionary (Evangelistarium), with numerous lacunae. on 41 parchment leaves (27 cm by 21.5 cm). It contains lessons from the Gospel of Luke and Gospel of John. The leaves are arranged in quarto.

The text is written in Greek large minuscule letters, in two columns per page, 25 lines per page.

== History ==
Eduard de Muralt dated the manuscript to the 11th or 12th century, Gregory dated it to the 10th or 11th century. It has been assigned by the Institute for New Testament Textual Research to the 11th century.

The manuscript was examined and described by Eduard de Muralt.

The manuscript was added to the list of New Testament manuscripts by Gregory (number 255).

The manuscript is not cited in the critical editions of the Greek New Testament (UBS3).

The codex is housed at the Russian National Library (Gr. 84) in Saint Petersburg.

== See also ==
- List of New Testament lectionaries
- Biblical manuscript
- Textual criticism
- Lectionary 254

== Bibliography ==
- Eduard de Muralt, Catalogue des manuscrits grecs de la Bibliothèque Impériale publique (Petersburg 1864), p. 50 (as LXXXIV)
