= Lectionary 254 =

Lectionary ℓ 254
- New Testament manuscript
- Text: Evangelistarium
- Date: 11th century
- Script: Greek
- Now at: Russian National Library
- Size: 30 cm by 24 cm

Lectionary 254, designated by siglum ℓ 254 (in the Gregory-Aland numbering) is a Greek manuscript of the New Testament, on parchment. Palaeographically it has been assigned to the 11th century. The manuscript has survived on only one leaf.

== Description ==
The original codex contained lessons from the Gospels lectionary (Evangelistarium). The manuscript has survived on only one leaf. It contains text from the Gospel of Matthew 24:34-25:13.

The text is written in Greek large minuscule letters, on 1 parchment leaf (30 cm by 24 cm), in one column per page, 14 lines per page. It contains musical notes. The nomina sacra are written in an abbreviated way.

It has been assigned by the Institute for New Testament Textual Research to the 11th century.

== History ==
The manuscript used to be held at the Mount Athos. The name of the scribe was Michael.

The manuscript was examined and described by Peter P. Dubrovsky and Eduard de Muralt.

The manuscript was added to the list of New Testament manuscripts by Gregory (number 254).

The manuscript is not cited in the critical editions of the Greek New Testament (UBS3).

The codex is housed at the Russian National Library (Gr. 80) in Saint Petersburg, Russia.

== See also ==
- List of New Testament lectionaries
- Biblical manuscript
- Textual criticism
- Lectionary 253

== Bibliography ==
- Eduard de Muralt, Catalogue des manuscrits grecs de la Bibliothèque Impériale publique (Petersburg 1864), p. 48 (as LXXX)
