= Lectionary 252 =

Lectionary ℓ 252
- New Testament manuscript
- Text: Evangelistarium
- Date: 11th century
- Script: Greek
- Found: 1858
- Now at: Russian National Library
- Size: 33 cm by 27.4 cm

Lectionary 252, designated by siglum ℓ 252 (in the Gregory-Aland numbering) is a Greek manuscript of the New Testament, on parchment. Palaeographically it has been assigned to the 11th century. Frederick Henry Ambrose Scrivener labelled it as 195^{evl}.

== Description ==
The codex contains lessons from the Gospels lectionary (Evangelistarium), on 498 parchment leaves (33 cm by 27.4 cm). It contains texts of the Gospel of John and Matthew.

The text is written in Greek large minuscule letters, in two columns per page, 18/24 lines per page. It has breathings and accents; error of itacism, movable nu. The nomina sacra are written in an abbreviated way.

== History ==
Gregory and de Muralt dated the manuscript to the 10th or 11th century. It has been assigned by the Institute for New Testament Textual Research (INTF) to the 11th century.

The manuscript was presented by Metropolit of Trapezunt.

The manuscript was examined and described by Eduard de Muralt.

The manuscript was added to the list of New Testament manuscripts by Scrivener (number 195) and Gregory (number 252).

The manuscript is not cited in the critical editions of the Greek New Testament (UBS3).

The codex is housed at the Russian National Library (Gr. 69) in Saint Petersburg.

== See also ==
- List of New Testament lectionaries
- Biblical manuscript
- Textual criticism
- Lectionary 250

== Bibliography ==
- Eduard de Muralt, Catalogue des manuscrits grecs de la Bibliothèque Impériale publique (Petersburg 1864), pp. 40–41 (as LXIX)
