= Uncial 082 =

- New Testament manuscript
- Text: Ephesians 4
- Date: 6th century
- Script: Greek
- Now at: State Historical Museum
- Size: ?
- Type: mixed
- Category: III

Uncial 082 (in the Gregory-Aland numbering) α 1024 (Soden), is a Greek uncial manuscript of the New Testament, assigned palaeographically to the 6th century.

== Description ==
The codex contains a small part of the Epistle to the Ephesians 4:2-18 on one parchment leaf. The text is written in two columns per page, 26 lines per page. Original size of the leaves is unknown, because it was cut to reinforce a binding.

The Greek text of this codex is mixed. Aland placed in Category III.

== History ==
Currently it is dated by the INTF to the 6th century.

Constantin von Tischendorf saw this leaf in 1868 in Moscow. It was examined by Kurt Treu in 1966 and Pasquale Orsini in 2005.

The codex now is located in State Historical Museum (V. 108) in Moscow.

== See also ==
- List of New Testament uncials
- Textual criticism
