= Lectionary 253 =

Lectionary ℓ 253
- New Testament manuscript
- Text: Evangelistarium
- Date: 1020
- Script: Greek
- Now at: Russian National Library
- Size: 18.4 cm by 15.1 cm

Lectionary 253, designated by siglum ℓ 253 (in the Gregory-Aland numbering) is a Greek manuscript of the New Testament, on parchment. It is dated by a colophon to the year 1020. Scrivener labelled it as 196^{evl}.

== Description ==
The codex contains lessons from the Gospels lectionary (Evangelistarium), with numerous lacunae, on 169 parchment leaves (18.4 cm by 15.1 cm). It contains 174 lessons from the Gospel of John.

The text is written in Greek large minuscule letters, in two columns per page, 19-21 lines per page. It has breathings; error of itacism.

The lessons of the codex were red from Easter to Pentecost.

In John 14:14 the entire verse is omitted along with the manuscripts: X f^{1} 565 1009 1365 ℓ 76 Codex Veronensis vg^{mss} Syriac Sinaiticus syr^{pal} arm geo Diatessaron.

== History ==
According to the colophon it was written in Salerno, in 1020. The name of the scribe was Michael.

The manuscript was examined and described by Peter P. Dubrovsky and Eduard de Muralt.

The manuscript was added to the list of New Testament manuscripts by Scrivener (number 196) and Gregory (number 253).

The manuscript is sporadically cited in the critical editions of the Greek New Testament (UBS3).

Currently the codex is housed at the Russian National Library (Gr. 71) in Saint Petersburg.

== See also ==
- List of New Testament lectionaries
- Biblical manuscript
- Textual criticism
- Lectionary 252

== Bibliography ==
- Eduard de Muralt, Catalogue des manuscrits grecs de la Bibliothèque Impériale publique (Petersburg 1864), pp. 41–42 (as LXXI)
