= Lectionary 256 =

Lectionary ℓ 256
- New Testament manuscript
- Text: Evangelistarium, Apostolarium
- Date: 12th century
- Script: Greek
- Now at: Russian National Library
- Size: 19.6 cm by 14.2 cm

Lectionary 256, designated by siglum ℓ 256 (in the Gregory-Aland numbering) is a Greek manuscript of the New Testament, on parchment. Palaeographically it has been assigned to the 12th century. Scrivener labelled it as 192^{evl}. The manuscript has survived in a fragmentary condition.

== Description ==
The codex contains lessons from the Gospels and from the rest of the New Testament lectionary (Evangelistarium, Apostolarium), with numerous lacunae on 93 parchment leaves (19.6 cm by 14.2 cm). The leaves of the manuscript were arranged in octavo.

The text is written in Greek large minuscule letters, in one column per page, 21 lines per page.

== History ==
Constantin von Tischendorf dated the manuscript to the 11th or 12th century. De Muralt, Scrivener, and Gregory dated the manuscript to the 12th century. It has been assigned by the Institute for New Testament Textual Research to the 12th century.

The manuscript was brought by Tischendorf from the East. It was examined and described by Eduard de Muralt.

The manuscript was added to the list of New Testament manuscripts by Scrivener (number 192) and Gregory (number 256).

The manuscript is not cited in the critical editions of the Greek New Testament (UBS3).

The codex is housed at the Russian National Library (Gr. 90) in Saint Petersburg, Russia.

== See also ==
- List of New Testament lectionaries
- Biblical manuscript
- Textual criticism
- Lectionary 255

== Bibliography ==
- C. v. Tischendorf, Notitia editionis codicis Bibliorum Sinaitici (F. A. Brockhaus: Leipzig 1860), p. 63
- Eduard de Muralt, Catalogue des manuscrits grecs de la Bibliothèque Impériale publique (Petersburg 1864), p. 51 (as XC)
