= Lectionary 247 =

Lectionary ℓ 247
- New Testament manuscript
- Text: Evangelistarium
- Date: 9th century
- Script: Greek
- Now at: Russian National Library
- Size: 30 cm by 24 cm
- Hand: uncial

Lectionary 247, designated by siglum ℓ 247 (in the Gregory-Aland numbering) is a Greek manuscript of the New Testament, on parchment. Palaeographically it has been assigned to the 9th century.

== Description ==
The codex contains lessons from the Gospels lectionary (Evangelistarium). It contains text of Matthew 8:10-13.

The text is written in Greek large uncial letters, on a fragment of 1 parchment leaf (30 cm by 24 cm), in two columns per page, 11 lines per page (original page 20 lines).

== History ==
It is assigned by the INTF to the 9th century.

The manuscript came from collection of Peter Dubrovsky. It was examined and described by Eduard de Muralt.

The manuscript was added to the list of New Testament manuscripts by Gregory (number 247).

The manuscript is not cited in the critical editions of the Greek New Testament (UBS3).

The codex is housed at the Russian National Library (Gr.40 ) in Saint Petersburg.

== See also ==
- List of New Testament lectionaries
- Biblical manuscript
- Textual criticism
- Lectionary 246

== Bibliography ==
- Eduard de Muralt, Catalogue des manuscrits grecs de la Bibliothèque Impériale publique (Petersburg 1864), p. 23 (as XL)
