= Lectionary 173 =

Lectionary ℓ 173
- New Testament manuscript
- Text: Apostolarion
- Date: 10th century
- Script: Greek
- Now at: National Library of Russia
- Size: 25.2 by 19.3 cm

Lectionary 173, designated by siglum ℓ 173 (in the Gregory-Aland numbering) is a Greek manuscript of the New Testament, on parchment leaves. Paleographically it has been assigned to the 10th century. Formerly it was labelled as Lectionary 73^{a}. Scrivener by 54^{a}.

== Description ==
The codex contains Lessons from the Acts and Epistles lectionary (Apostolarion), on 178 parchment leaves (25.2 cm by 19.3 cm). The text is written in Greek minuscule letters, in two columns per page, 18 lines per page.

== History ==
The manuscript was examined by Eduard de Muralt and Gregory.

The manuscript is not cited in the critical editions of the Greek New Testament (UBS3), but it was used for the Editio Critica Maior.

Currently the codex is located in the National Library of Russia (Gr. 57) at Saint Petersburg.

== See also ==
- List of New Testament lectionaries
- Biblical manuscript
- Textual criticism
