= Lectionary 76 =

Lectionary ℓ 76
- New Testament manuscript
- Text: Evangelistarion
- Date: 12th-century
- Script: Greek
- Now at: Bibliothèque nationale de France
- Size: 33 cm by 23.1 cm

Lectionary 76, designated by siglum ℓ 76 (in the Gregory-Aland numbering), is a Greek manuscript of the New Testament, on vellum leaves. Palaeographically it has been assigned to the 12th-century.

== Description ==
The codex contains lessons from the Gospels of John, Matthew, Luke lectionary (Evangelistarium) with some lacunae. It is written in Greek minuscule letters, on 182 parchment leaves (33 cm by 23.1 cm), in 2 columns per page, 27-29 lines per page. It contains the Menologion and musical notes.

In Matthew 9:4 it has unique reading και ειδος against και ειδων or και ειδως.

John 14:14 the entire verse is omitted along with manuscripts X f^{1} 565 1009 1365 ℓ 253 b vg^{mss} syr^{s, pal} arm geo Diatessaron.

== History ==
The manuscript once belonged to the Colbert's Library.

It was partially examined by Scholz and Paulin Martin. C. R. Gregory saw it in 1885.

The manuscript is cited in the critical editions of the Greek New Testament (UBS3).

Currently the codex is located in the Bibliothèque nationale de France (Gr. 295) in Paris.

== See also ==
- List of New Testament lectionaries
- Biblical manuscript
- Textual criticism
