= Lectionary 246 =

Lectionary ℓ 246
- New Testament manuscript
- Text: Evangelistarium
- Date: 9th century
- Script: Greek
- Now at: Russian National Library
- Size: 28 cm by 24.9 cm

Lectionary 246, designated by siglum ℓ 246 (in the Gregory-Aland numbering) is a Greek manuscript of the New Testament, on parchment. Palaeographically it has been assigned to the 9th century. The manuscript has survived on only two leaves. Scrivener labelled it as 194^{evl}.

== Description ==
The codex contains lessons from the Gospels lectionary (Evangelistarium). It contains texts of Luke 9:33-36; Matthew 17:1-9; Mark 6:14-18; Matthew 8:11-13.

The text is written in Greek large uncial letters, on 2 parchment leaves (36.7 cm by 24.9 cm), in two columns per page, 21 lines per page. It has breathings and accents; iota subscript and error of itacism occur; the nomina sacra are contracted.

== History ==
It has been assigned by the Institute for New Testament Textual Research to the 9th century.

The manuscript came from collection of Peter Dubrovsky. It was examined and described by Eduard de Muralt.

The manuscript was added to the list of New Testament manuscripts by Scrivener (number 194) and Gregory (number 246).

The manuscript is not cited in the critical editions of the Greek New Testament (UBS3).

The codex is housed at the Russian National Library (Gr. 39) in Saint Petersburg.

== See also ==
- List of New Testament lectionaries
- Biblical manuscript
- Textual criticism
- Lectionary 245

== Bibliography ==
- Eduard de Muralt, Catalogue des manuscrits grecs de la Bibliothèque Impériale publique (Petersburg 1864), p. 22-23 (as XXXIX)
