= Minuscule 568 =

- New Testament manuscript
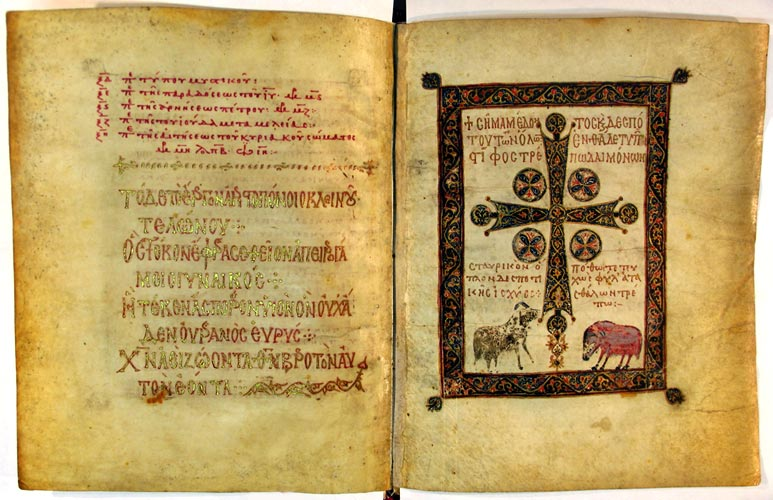
- Epigram about Matthew the Evangelist and verses about the cross
- Text: Gospels
- Date: 10th century
- Script: Greek
- Now at: Russian National Library
- Size: 22 cm by 17.5 cm
- Type: Byzantine text-type
- Category: V

Minuscule 568 (in the Gregory-Aland numbering), ε 189 (in the Soden numbering), is a Greek minuscule manuscript of the New Testament, on parchment. Palaeographically it has been assigned to the 10th century.

== Description ==
The codex contains a complete text of the four Gospels on 259 parchment leaves (size 22 cm by 17.5 cm). It has ornamented head-pieces. The writing is in one column per page, 24 lines per page.

The text is divided according to the κεφαλαια (chapters), whose numerals are given at the margin, and the τιτλοι (titles) at the top of the pages. There is also a division according to the smaller Ammonian Sections, with references to the Eusebian Canons.

It contains Epistula ad Carpianum, the Eusebian tables, tables of the κεφαλαια before every Gospel, Synaxarion, Menologion, and pictures.

== Text ==
The Greek text of the codex is a representative of the Byzantine text-type. Hermann von Soden classified it to the K^{ak} (with hesitation). Aland placed it in Category V. According to the Claremont Profile Method it represents the textual family K^{x} in Luke 1, Luke 10, and Luke 20.

== History ==
The manuscript was presented by consul of Syra, Sandrinus. In 1851 it was donated to the Imperial Public Library in Petersburg by Sandrini, the consul of the Syros Island.

The manuscripts was examined and described by Eduard de Muralt (along with the codices 565-566, 569-572, 574, 575, and 1567), then by Kurt Treu.

Scrivener labelled it by 879, Gregory by 568.

Currently the manuscript is housed at the Russian National Library (Gr. 67) in Saint Petersburg.

== See also ==
- List of New Testament minuscules
- Biblical manuscript
- Textual criticism
