= Lectionary 259 =

Lectionary ℓ 259
- New Testament manuscript
- Text: Apostolarium
- Date: 13th century
- Script: Greek
- Now at: Bodleian Library
- Size: 28.5 cm by 21.5 cm

Lectionary 259, designated by siglum ℓ 259 (in the Gregory-Aland numbering) is a Greek manuscript of the New Testament, on parchment. Palaeographically it has been assigned to the 13th century. Scrivener labelled it as 76^{a}, Gregory by 83^{a}. The manuscript has survived in a fragmentary condition.

== Description ==
The codex contains lessons from the Acts of the Apostles and Epistles lectionary (Apostolarium), with numerous lacunae. Only 14 leaves of the codex have survived (28.5 cm by 21.5 cm). The text is written in Greek large minuscule letters, on parchment, in two columns per page, 22 lines per page. It contains nine lessons from 2 Timothy 3:2-9; Romans 5:18–21; 8:3–9; 9:29–33; 2 Corinthians 5:15–21; Galatians 3:28–4:5; Colossans 1:18–22; Philemon 3:3–9; Romans 8:8–14.

== History ==
Scrivener and Gregory dated the manuscript to the 13th century. It has been assigned by the Institute for New Testament Textual Research (INTF) to the 13th century.

According to the colophon it was written by Simeon, a reader, the date vanished (in red).

The manuscript was found by E. B. Nicholson.

The manuscript was added to the list of New Testament manuscripts by Scrivener (number 76^{a}) and Gregory (number 83^{a}). Gregory saw the manuscript in 1883.

The manuscript is not cited in the critical editions of the Greek New Testament (UBS3).

The codex is housed at the Bodleian Library (Auct. T. inf. 2.11) in Oxford, England.

== See also ==
- List of New Testament lectionaries
- Biblical manuscript
- Textual criticism
- Lectionary 258

== Bibliography ==
- Gregory, Caspar René (1900). Textkritik des Neuen Testaments. Vol. 1. Leipzig: J.C. Hinrichs. p. 469.
