= Uncial 059 =

- New Testament manuscript
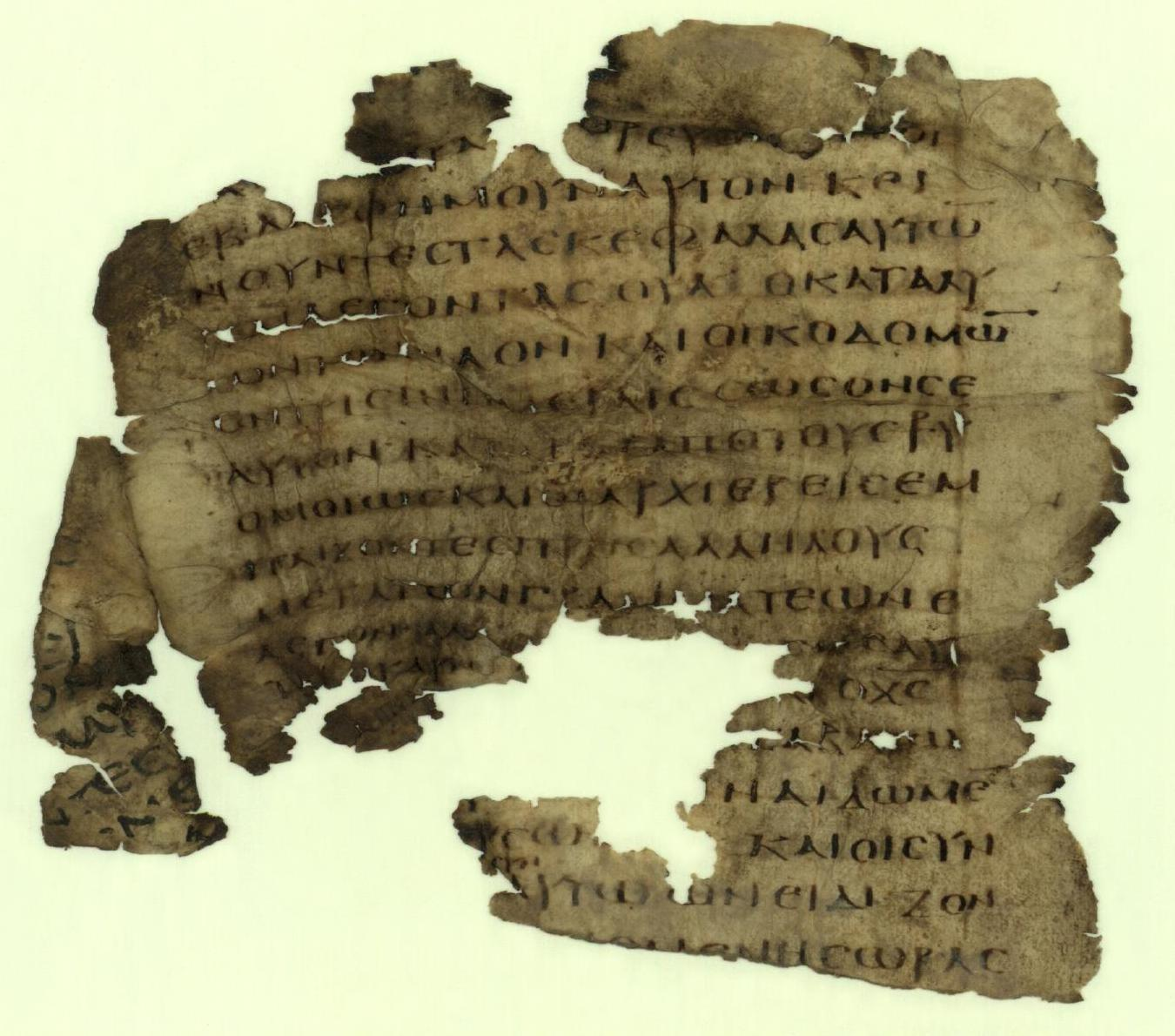
- Fragment with Mark 15:29-33
- Text: Mark 15 †
- Date: 4th/5th century
- Script: Greek
- Now at: Austrian National Library
- Size: 15 x 11 cm
- Type: Alexandrian text-type
- Category: III

Uncial 059 (in the Gregory-Aland numbering), ε 09 (Soden), is a Greek uncial manuscript of the New Testament, dated paleographically to the 4th or 5th century.

== Description ==
The codex contains a part of the Gospel of Mark (15:29-38), on 1 parchment leaf (15 cm by 11 cm). The text is written in one column per page, 19 lines per page.

The leaf designated by 059 came from the same manuscript as 0215 (Mark 15:20-21,26-27).

== Text ==
recto

ΠΑ[ραπ]ΟΡΕΥ[ομεν]οι

ΕΒΛΑΣΦΗΜΟΥΝ ΑΥΤΟΝ ΚΕΙ
ΝΟΥΝΤΕΣΤΑΣΚΕΦΑΛΑΣΑΥΤΩ
ΚΑΙΛΕΓΟΝΤΑΣ ΟΥΑ ΟΚΑΤΑΛΥ
ΩΥΤΟΝ[ν]ΑΟΝΚΑΙΟΚΟΔΟΜΩ
ΕΝΤΡΙΣΙΝΗΜΕΡΑΙΣΣΩΣΟΝΣΕ
ΑΥΤΟΝ ΚΑΤΑΒΑΣΑΠΟΤΟΥΣ̅Ρ̅Υ̅
ΟΙΟΙΩΣΚΑΙΟΙΑΡΧΙΕΡΕΙΣΕΜ
ΠΑΙΖΟΝΤΕΣΠΡΟΣΑΛΛΗΛΟΥΣ
ΜΕΤΑΤΩΝΓΡΑΜ[μ]ΑΤΕΩΝΕ
ΛΕΓΟΝ ΑΛ[λους εσωσεν]ΕΑΥ
Τ[ον ου]ΔΥΝ[αται σωσαι ο]Χ̅Σ̅
[erased κατ]Α[βατ]Ω
[... ι]ΝΑΙΔΩΜΕ
[και πιστευ]ΣΩ[μεν]ΚΑΙΟΙΣΥΝ
[εσταυρωμενοι]ΑΥΤΩΩΝΕΙΔΙΖΟΝ
[αυτον γ]ΕΝΟΜΕΝΗΣΩΡΑΣ
[erased]

verso

ΕΦ[ολην]ΤΗΝ[εως ωρας]
ΕΝΑΤΗΣ ΚΑΙΤΗΕΝΑΤΗΩΡΑ
ΕΒΟΗΣΕΝΟΙ̅Σ̅ΦΩΝΗΜΕΓΑΛΗ
ΗΛΕΙΗΛΕΙ ΛΑΜΑΣΑΒΑ[χθα]
ΝΕΙ ΟΕΣΤΙΝΜΕΘΕ[ρμηνευο]
ΜΕΝΟΝ ΟΘ̅Σ̅ΟΘ̅Σ̅ΜΟΥΕΣΤΙ
ΕΓΚΑΤΕΛΙΠΕΣ[μ]ΕΚΑΙΤΙΝΕΣ
ΤΩΝΠΑΡΕΣΤΗ[κοτων ακου]
ΣΑΝΤΕΣΕΛΕΓΟΝ[ιδου ηλιαν]
ΦΩΝΕΙ .............. ΚΑΙ [γε]
ΜΙ [σας ............. erased ]
[....................................]
[....................................]
ΤΑΙΗΛΕΙ [ας καθελειν]
οδεισα . [...................]
ΕΞΕΙΠΝΕΝΥΣΕΝ .. [.......]
ΤΑΣΜΑΤΟΥΝΑ

The Greek text of this codex is a representative of the Alexandrian text-type. Aland placed it in Category III.

== History ==
Currently it is dated by the INTF to the 4th or 5th century.

The manuscript was examined by Karl Wessely, Guglielmo Cavallo, and Pasquale Orsini. Gregory added it to the list of New Testament manuscripts.

The codex is located at the Austrian National Library, in Vienna. Leaf 059 has number of catalogue Pap. G. 39779, and leaf 0215 – Pap. G. 36112.

== See also ==
- List of New Testament uncials
- Textual criticism
