= Codex Veronensis =

5th-century Latin Gospel Book

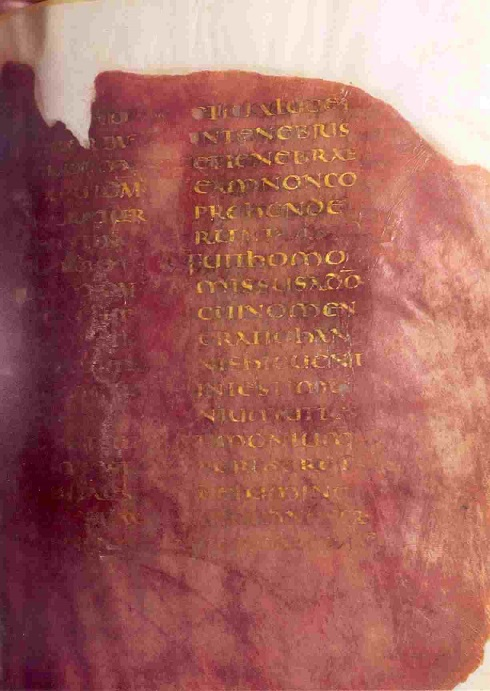
Codex Veronensis

The Codex Veronensis is a 5th-century Latin manuscript of the four Gospels, written on vellum which has been dyed purple. It is designated by the siglum b in the critical editions of Nestle-Åland and the UBS Greek New Testament, and 4 in the Beuron system of New Testament Latin manuscripts. The text is written in silver and occasionally gold ink, and is a version of the old Latin New Testament Gospels. The Gospels follow in the Western order.

== Description ==
The manuscript is a codex (precursor to the modern book format), containing the Latin text of the four Gospels written on purple parchment, with 1 column and 18 lines per page. It has several missing sections (Matthew 1:1-11; 15:12-23; 23:18-27; John 7:44-8:12; Luke 19:26-21:29; Mark 13:9-19; 13:24-16:20). Of the several pages which are missing, they also include the pages which contained John 7:44-8:11. Space-considerations show that the missing pages included John 7:53-8:11, the passage known as the Pericope Adulterae.

Gold ink is used for the first page of each Gospel book, and all nomina sacra (special names/titles employed in early Christian writings and copies of the New Testament books) are also written in gold ink.

== Text ==
The Latin text of the codex is a representative of the Western text-type in its European/Italian recension. The codex is one of the principal witnesses to the Old Latin Text-Type I along with manuscripts Codex Corbeiensis II (VL8) and Codex Vindobonensis (VL17), although in John 1:1-10:13 it has a slightly earlier type of the Old Latin text.

In biblical scholar Francis Crawford Burkitt's opinion, it represents the type of text that Jerome used as the basis of the Vulgate.

In Luke 8:21 it reads αυτον instead of αυτους; the reading αυτον is supported by 𝔓^{75}, and Minuscule 705.

In John 1:34 reads ὁ ἐκλεκτός together with the manuscripts 𝔓^{5}, 𝔓^{106}, א, e, ff^{2}, syr^{c, s}.

In John 14:14 the entire verse is omitted along with manuscripts X f^{1} 565 1009 1365 ℓ 76 ℓ 253 vg^{mss} sy^{s, p} arm geo Diatessaron.

== History ==
The earliest history of the manuscript is unknown. It was examined by multi-specialist scholar Giuseppe Bianchini in the mid-18th century. The text was edited by Bianchini, Belsheim, and Jülicher.

It was named Veronensis after Verona, the city where it was located. It is currently located in the Chapter Library, at the Verona Cathedral (Biblioteca Capitolare della Cattedrale di Verona).

== See also ==
- List of New Testament Latin manuscripts
- Purple parchment
