= Minuscule 574 =

- New Testament manuscript
- Text: Gospels †
- Date: 13th century
- Script: Greek
- Now at: Russian National Library
- Size: 19 cm by 14 cm
- Type: Byzantine
- Category: V

Minuscule 574 (in the Gregory-Aland numbering), ε 1295 (in the Soden numbering), is a Greek minuscule manuscript of the New Testament, on parchment. Palaeographically it has been assigned to the 13th century. The manuscript is lacunose.

== Description ==
The codex contains the text of the four Gospels on 215 parchment leaves (size 19 cm by 14 cm) with lacunae (John 10:1-11:38; 11:39-57; 12:25-13:1; 15:26-16:15). The writing is in one column per page, 27 lines per page.

It contains tables of the κεφαλαια before each Gospel and portraits of the four Evangelists.

== Text ==
The Greek text of the codex is a representative of the Byzantine text-type. Hermann von Soden classified it to the textual family K^{x}. Aland placed it in Category V. According to the Claremont Profile Method it represents K^{x} in Luke 10 (cluster with codex 281), in Luke 20 it creates cluster with the code 585, in Luke 1 it has mixed text.

== History ==
The manuscript came from Karahissar. (Note: Muralt's catalogue says no more than "Karahissar", which is ambiguous. The problem may be impossible to resolve. It can only be noted that Afyonkarahisar is nowadays the most populous of the places, and the closest to Constantinople, where Titoff was stationed; and that Şebinkarahisar formerly had a sizable Armenian - likely Christian - population.) Titoff, Russian envoy in Turkey, purchased this manuscript and presented it to the Imperial Library in Petersburg.

The manuscripts was examined, described, and collated by Eduard de Muralt (along with the codices 565-566, 568-572, 575, and 1567). The manuscript was also examined by Kurt Treu.

Currently the manuscript is housed at the National Library of Russia (Gr. 105) in Saint Petersburg.

== See also ==
- List of New Testament minuscules
- Biblical manuscript
- Textual criticism
