= Peter P. Dubrovsky =

Russian bibliophile, diplomat, paleographer and collector of manuscripts and books

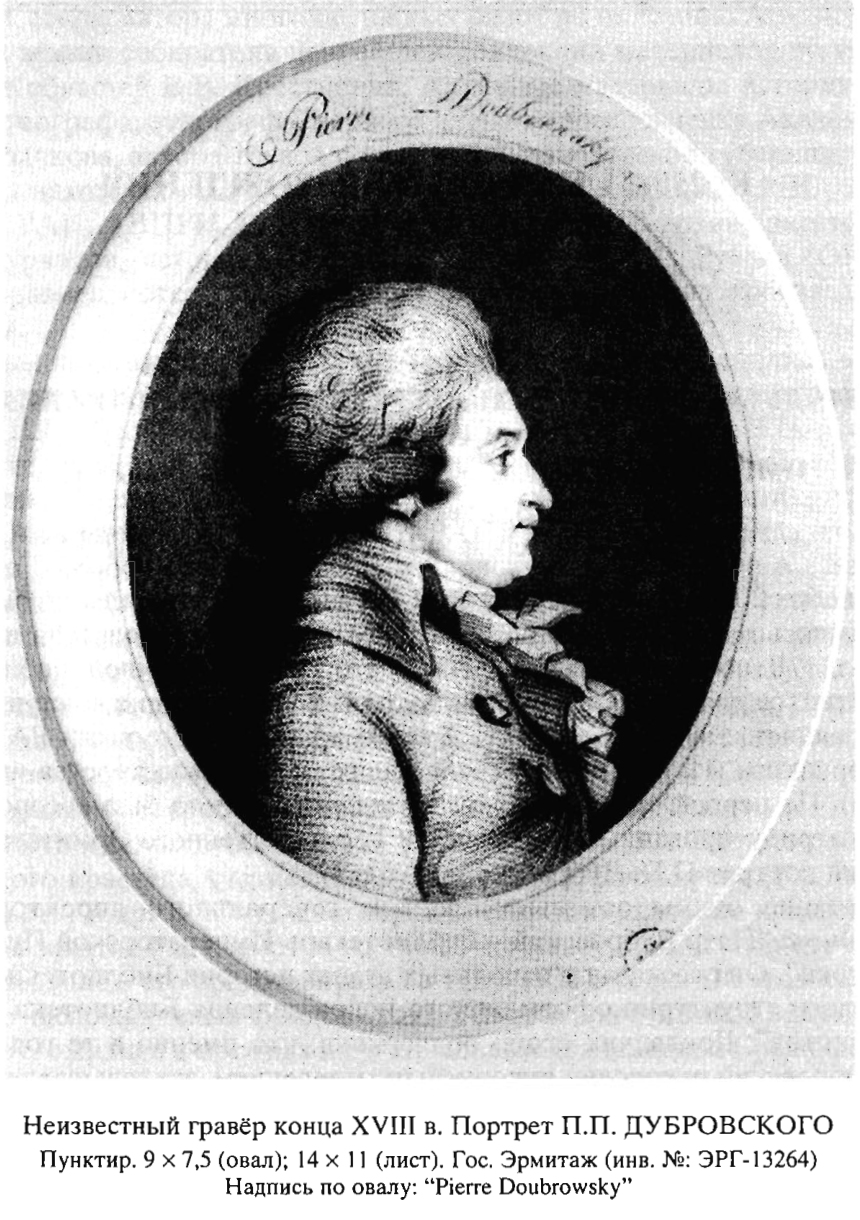
- Unknown engraver - end of XVIII century. Portrait of P.P. Dubrovsky. Dotted line. 9x7.5 (oval); 14×11 (sheet). State Hermitage (inv. No. ERG-13264). The inscription on the oval: “Pierre Doubrowsky”
- Born: December 9, 1754; Kiev, Russian Empire
- Died: January 9, 1816 (aged 61); Saint Petersburg, Russian Empire
- Burial place: Smolensky Cemetery, St. Petersburg
- Occupations: paleographer, diplomat
- Known for: manuscript collector

Peter Petrovich Dubrovsky (Russian: Пётр Петрович Дубровский; December 9, 1754 – January 9, 1816), was a Russian bibliophile, diplomat, paleographer, secretary of the Russian Embassy in France, collector of manuscripts and books. Throughout his life he collected about 2000 manuscripts. Between 1805 and 1812 he worked at the Imperial Public Library.

== Life ==
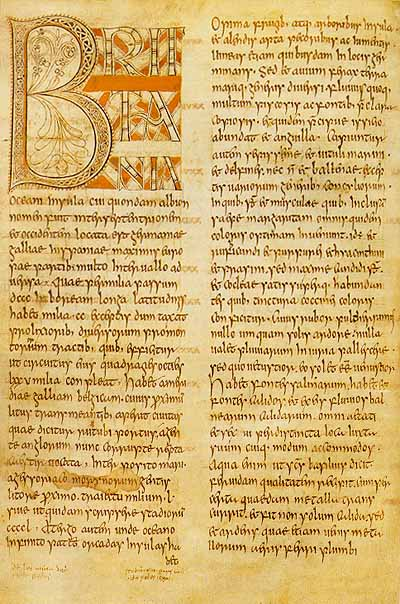
Folio 3v from the Saint Petersburg Bede

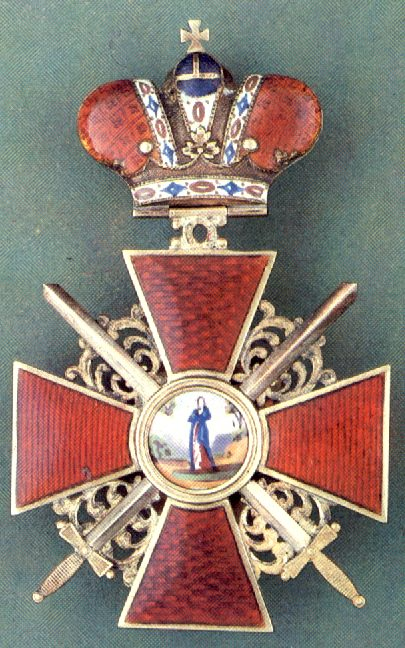
Order of St. Anna, 2nd class

In 1772 Dubrovsky finished his studies at the Kyiv-Mohyla Academy in Kyiv (Russian: Киево-Могилянская академия). In 1773 he served as a copyist in the Synod. Between 1780 and 1805 Dubrovsky worked in the Board of foreign affairs as a churchman at the Russian ambassadorial church in Paris and as a secretary-translator for embassies in France and Holland.

During the French Revolution he acquired manuscripts and documents from the public libraries in France. Most of them were stored at the Bastille, in the Saint-Germain-des-Prés, and the monastic Library of Corbie Abbey. The material was not safe as the Jacobin mobs plundered French cities.

In February 1800, Dubrovsky returned to Petersburg with a collection of 400 Western European medieval manuscripts, miniatures, and early books. Somehow he came into possession of 94 manuscripts from the East (in Greek, Persian, Arabian, Hebrew and 11 other languages), about 50 Slavic manuscripts. In England some proposals were made to Dubrovsky; he was offered a fabulous sum for his collection, but he flatly refused negotiations with foreigners, having declared that it was his sincere desire to transport the collection home.

In his collection there were also some runic books from the collection of Anne Queen of England (this collection has been lost). and the Saint Petersburg Bede, an Insular 8th-century manuscript of the Historia ecclesiastica gentis Anglorum of the English People written by Venerable Bede.

Originally Dubrovsky's collection interested Russian bibliophiles. In 1805, Alexander I of Russia accepted the collection as donation to the Imperial Public Library, where his collection became the basis of the "Manuscript Depository". (Recently it was established that one manuscript with an inscription allegedly by Anne of Kiev is in fact a Serb manuscript of the 14th century.) As a consequence of the donation, Dubrovsky received the Anna's award of the 2nd class and he was also appointed as a keeper of the manuscripts under an offer by the Department of Manuscripts (Russian: Депо манускриптов). He described every document in his collection. Unfortunately some of the descriptions were lost.

As part of his duties, Dubrovsky examined and described 11,000 manuscripts dispatched from the Załuski Library, after the second Partition of Poland and Kościuszko Uprising.

He was discharged from the post on 5 April 1812. Dubrovsky wrote: "Жизнь наша коротка, все условия, все награды с нею кончаются, но полезное для ума человеческого служит до окончания мира" (Our life is short, all conditions, all awards with it come to an end, but useful to the mind of human serves before the termination of the world).

After his death he was found to have had zero items of value in his private collection. Furthermore, the secret of the location of the runic books followed him to the grave.

According to Graham Stewart, a journalist: "We should recognise that Dubrovsky did not just Russia a favour, but also the world," because he rescued many manuscripts from possible destruction.

== Some manuscripts acquired by Dubrovsky ==
- Codex Sangermanensis
- Two leaves from Codex Coislinianus
- Codex Corbeiensis I
- Minuscule 330
- Lectionary 246
- Lectionary 247
- Lectionary 253
- Lectionary 254
- Part of the manuscript of Origen's Homiliae (MS. Lat. F v I 4)
- The manuscript of the Breviloquium Vitae Wilfridi
- Saint Petersburg Bede, the 8th-century manuscript of the Historia ecclesiastica gentis Anglorum of Bede
