= Minuscule 705 =

- New Testament manuscript
- Text: Gospel of Luke–Gospel of John
- Date: 13th century
- Script: Greek
- Now at: Dumbarton Oaks
- Size: 23.5 cm by 17 cm
- Type: Byzantine text-type
- Category: V

Minuscule 705 (in the Gregory-Aland numbering), ε360 (von Soden), is a Greek minuscule manuscript of the New Testament, on parchment. Palaeographically it has been assigned to the 13th century. The manuscript has complex contents. Scrivener labelled it by 887^{e}.

== Description ==
The codex contains the text of the four Gospel of Luke and Gospel of John on 254 parchment leaves (size 23.5 cm by 17 cm).

The text is written in one column per page, 18 lines per page.

It contains lists of the κεφαλαια (list of contents) before each Gospel and pictures.

== Text ==
The Greek text of the codex is a representative of the Byzantine text-type. Hermann von Soden classified it to the textual family K^{x}. Kurt Aland placed it in Category V.

According to the Claremont Profile Method it represents mixed Byzantine text, related to the textual family K^{x} in Luke 1 and Luke 20. In Luke 10 no profile was made.

In Luke 8:21 it reads αυτον instead of αυτους; the reading αυτον is supported by Papyrus 75, and Codex Veronensis.

== History ==
Scrivener and Gregory dated the manuscript to the 13th century. Currently the manuscript is dated by the Institute for New Testament Textual Research to the 13th century.

In 1521 it was in Gortyna on Crete.

It was added to the list of New Testament manuscript by Gregory (705). Gregory saw the manuscript in 1883.

Formerly it was housed in London, in Quaritch (Catalogue 94, No. 146), then it belonged to Lord Amherst of Hackney.

Currently, the manuscript is housed at the Dumbarton Oaks (Ms. 4, acc. no. 74.1) in Washington, D.C.

== See also ==
- List of New Testament minuscules
- Biblical manuscript
- Textual criticism
