= Lectionary 250 =

Lectionary ℓ 250
- New Testament manuscript
- Text: Evangelistarium, Apostolarium
- Date: 10th century
- Script: Greek
- Now at: Russian National Library
- Size: 30.2 cm by 22.2 cm

Lectionary 250, designated by siglum ℓ 250 (in the Gregory-Aland numbering) is a Greek manuscript of the New Testament, on parchment. Palaeographically it has been assigned to the 10th century.

== Description ==
The codex contains lessons from the Gospels and Epistles lectionary (Evangelistarium, Apostolarium).

The text is written in Greek uncial letters, on 198 parchment leaves (32.2 cm by 22.2 cm), in three columns per page, 27 lines. It has breathing and accents, sign of interrogative; iota subscript, N ephelkystikon. The nomina sacra are written in an abbreviated way.

The lessons of the codex were red from Easter to Pentecost. There are 12 lessons for Passion and 2-3 for Resurrection.

== History ==
It has been assigned by the INTF to the 10th century. It was created in a large scriptorium in Constantinople.

The manuscript was donated to the Imperial Public Library in Petersburg in 1859 by A. Lobanov-Rostovsky.

The manuscript was examined and described by Eduard de Muralt.

The manuscript was added to the list of New Testament manuscripts by Gregory (number 250).

The manuscript is not cited in the critical editions of the Greek New Testament (UBS3).

The codex is housed at the Russian National Library (Gr.55) in Saint Petersburg.

== See also ==
- List of New Testament lectionaries
- Biblical manuscript
- Textual criticism
- Lectionary 248

== Bibliography ==
- Eduard de Muralt, Catalogue des manuscrits grecs de la Bibliothèque Impériale publique (Petersburg 1864), p. 31 (as LV)
