= Minuscule 575 =

- New Testament manuscript
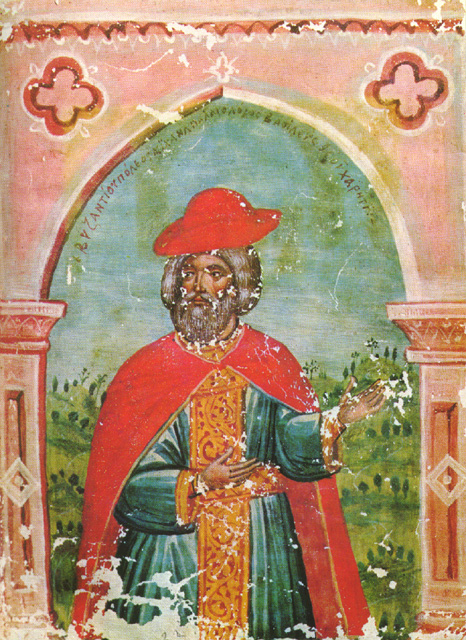
- Text: Gospels
- Date: 15th century
- Script: Greek
- Now at: Russian National Library
- Size: 17.9 cm by 13.5 cm
- Type: Byzantine
- Category: V

Minuscule 575 (in the Gregory-Aland numbering), ε 352 (in the Soden numbering), is a Greek minuscule manuscript of the New Testament, on parchment. Palaeographically it has been assigned to the 15th century. It was labeled by Scrivener as 477. The manuscript has complex contents.

== Description ==
The codex contains the text of the four Gospels on 386 parchment leaves (size 17.9 cm by 13.5 cm). The writing is in one column per page, 18 lines per page. It contains Eusebian tables at the beginning of the manuscript, liturgical books with hagiographies (Synaxarion and Menologion), and numerous pictures, including a portrait of the Byzantine emperor Michael VIII Palaiologos.

== Text ==
The Greek text of the codex is a representative of the Byzantine text-type. Hermann von Soden classified it to the textual family K^{r}. Aland placed it in Category V. According to the Claremont Profile Method it represents K^{r} in Luke 1 and Luke 20. In Luke 10 no profile was made.

== History ==
The manuscript was produced for Demetrios Palaiologos. It is dated by the INTF to the 15th century.

The manuscripts was examined and described by Eduard de Muralt (along with the codices 565-566, 568, 570-572, 574, and 1567), who made the first collation of its text. The manuscript was more thoroughly examined by Kurt Treu.

Currently the manuscript is housed at the National Library of Russia (Gr. 118) in Saint Petersburg.

== See also ==
- List of New Testament minuscules
- Biblical manuscript
- Textual criticism
