= Codex Claromontanus =

Uncial 06
- New Testament manuscript
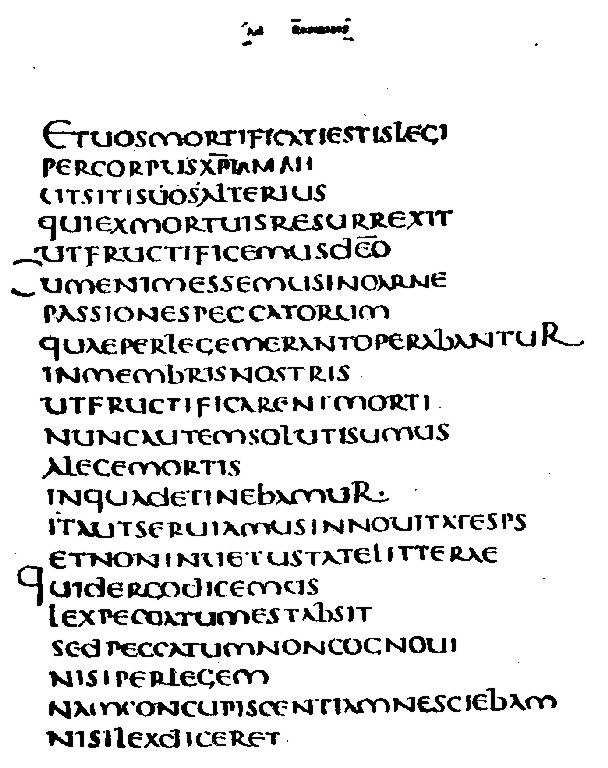
- The Latin text of Romans 7:4-7 from Codex Claromontanus
- Name: Claromontanus
- Sign: D^{p}, D_{2}
- Text: Pauline Epistles, Hebrews
- Date: c. ~550 or 400-600
- Script: Greek-Latin diglot
- Found: Clermont (purchased by Theodore Beza)
- Now at: National Library of France (Bibliothèque nationale de France)
- Size: 24.5 × 19.5 cm (9.6 × 7.7 in)
- Type: Western text-type
- Category: II
- Note: includes extra-canonical material

Codex Claromontanus, symbolized by D^{p}, D_{2} or 06 (in the Gregory-Aland numbering), δ 1026 (von Soden), is a Greek-Latin diglot uncial manuscript of the New Testament, written in an uncial hand on vellum. The Greek and Latin texts are on facing pages, thus it is a "diglot" manuscript, like Codex Bezae Cantabrigiensis. The Latin text is designated by d (traditional system) or by 75 in Beuron system.

== Description ==
The codex contains the Pauline epistles on 533 leaves, 24.5 × 19.5 cm (9.6 × 7.7 in). The text is written in one column per page, 21 lines per page. At least 9 different correctors worked on this codex. The fourth corrector, from the 9th century, added accents and breathings.

The codex is dated palaeographically to the 5th or 6th century.

The Codex Claromontanus contains further documents:

- A stichometric catalogue of the Old Testament and New Testament canon, known as the Catalogus Claromontanus, of uncertain date, has been inserted in the codex. The list omits Philippians, 1 and 2 Thessalonians, and Hebrews, but includes several works no longer considered canonical: Epistle of Barnabas, The Shepherd of Hermas, Acts of Paul, and Revelation of Peter. The two epistles of Peter are listed as if they were epistles of Paul to Peter ("ad Petrum"). The Epistle to the Hebrews follows after this catalogue.
- Two palimpsest leaves (nos. 162 and 163) are overwritten on fragments of the Phaethon of Euripides, faintly legible under the Christian text. They have been detached from the codex and in the National Library of France (Bibliothèque nationale de France) are designated Cod. Gr. 107 B.

== Text ==
The Greek text of this codex is highly valued by critics as representing an early form of the text in the Western text-type, characterized by frequent interpolations and, to a lesser extent, interpretive revisions presented as corrections to this text. Modern critical editions of the New Testament texts are produced by an eclectic method, where the preferred reading is determined on a case-by-case basis, from among numerous variants offered by the early manuscripts and versions.

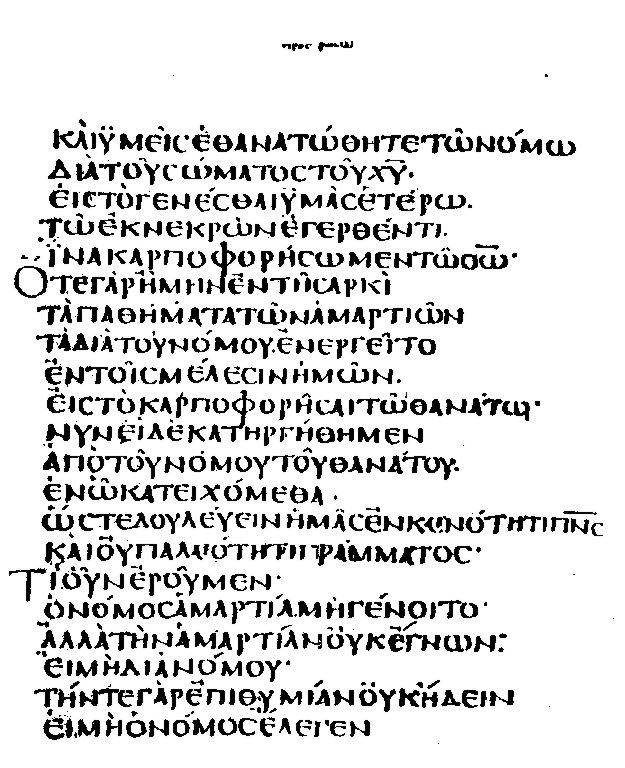
The Greek text of Romans 7:4-7

In this process, Claromontanus is often employed as a sort of "outside mediator" in collating the more closely related, that is mutually dependent, codices containing the Pauline epistles: Codex Alexandrinus (A), Codex Vaticanus (B), Codex Sinaiticus (א), and Codex Ephraemi Rescriptus (C). In a similar way, Codex Bezae Cantabrigiensis is used in establishing the history of texts of the Gospels and Acts.

The text is written colometrically and the order of the epistles to the Colossians and Philippians has been reversed compared to other texts. Kurt Aland placed the text of the codex in Category II.

In Romans 1:8 it has textual variant περι (along with א A B C K 33 81 1506 1739 1881), but a corrector changed this into υπερ, as in G Ψ Byz.

In Romans 8:1 it reads Ιησου (as א, B, G, 1739, 1881, it^{d, g}, cop^{sa, bo}, eth); corrector b changed it into Ιησου κατα σαρκα περιπατουσιν (as A, Ψ, 81, 629, 2127, vg); corrector c changed it into Ιησου μη κατα σαρκα περιπατουσιν αλλα κατα πνευμα (as א^{c}, K, P, 33, 88, 104, 181, 326, 330, (436 omit μη), 456, 614, 630, 1241, 1877, 1962, 1984, 1985, 2492, 2495, Byz, Lect).

In Romans 12:11 it reads καιρω for κυριω, the reading of the manuscript is supported by Codex Augiensis, Codex Boernerianus 5 it ^{d,g}, Origen^{lat}. The second corrector changed it into κυριω.

In Romans 15:31 it reads δωροφορια for διακονια; the reading is supported by Codex Vaticanus and Codex Boernerianus (Greek column).

In 1 Corinthians 7:5 it reads τη προσευχη (prayer) along with 𝔓^{11}, 𝔓^{46}, א*, A, B, C, G, P, Ψ, 33, 81, 104, 181, 629, 630, 1739, 1877, 1881, 1962, it vg, cop, arm, eth. Other manuscripts read τη νηστεια και τη προσευχη (fasting and prayer) or τη προσευχη και νηστεια (prayer and fasting).

The section 1 Corinthians 14:34-35 is placed after 1 Cor 14:40, just like other manuscripts of the Western text-type (Augiensis, Boernerianus, 88, it^{d, g}, and some manuscripts of Vulgate).

In 1 Timothy 3:1 it reads ανθρωπινος (human or of a man) — it^{b,d,g,m,mon} Ambrosiaster Jerome^{mss} Augustine Speculum; majority has πιστος (faithful).

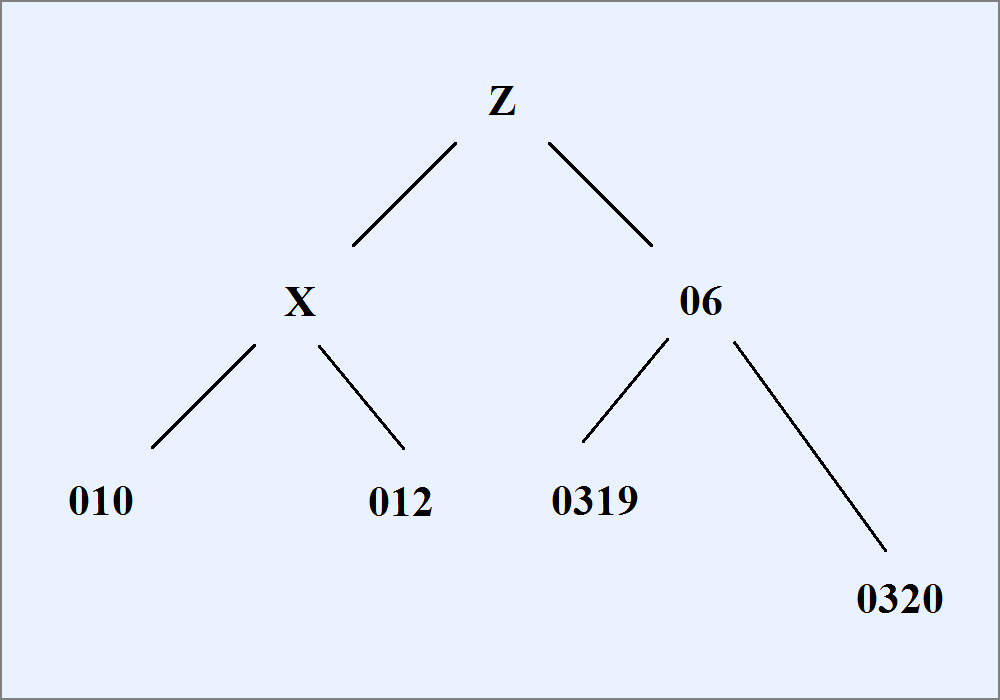
Relationship between Greek-Latin manuscripts of the NT in the Pauline epistles (06 - Claromontanus, 010 - Augiensis, 012 - Boernerianus, 0319 - Sangermanensis, 0320 - Waldeccensis)

== History ==
The Codex is preserved at the Bibliothèque nationale de France (Gr. 107), at Paris.

It was named by the Calvinist scholar Theodore Beza because he procured it in the town of Clermont-en-Beauvaisis, Oise, in the Picardy region north of Paris. Beza was the first to examine it, and he included notes of some of its readings in his editions of the New Testament. The later history of its use by editors of the Greek New Testament can be found in the links and references.

The manuscript was examined by Johann Jakob Griesbach and Constantin von Tischendorf, who edited the Greek text of the codex. Paul Sabatier edited the Latin text of the codex.

Johann Gottfried Jakob Hermann published in 1821 the palimpsest text of the leaves 162–163.

== Images ==
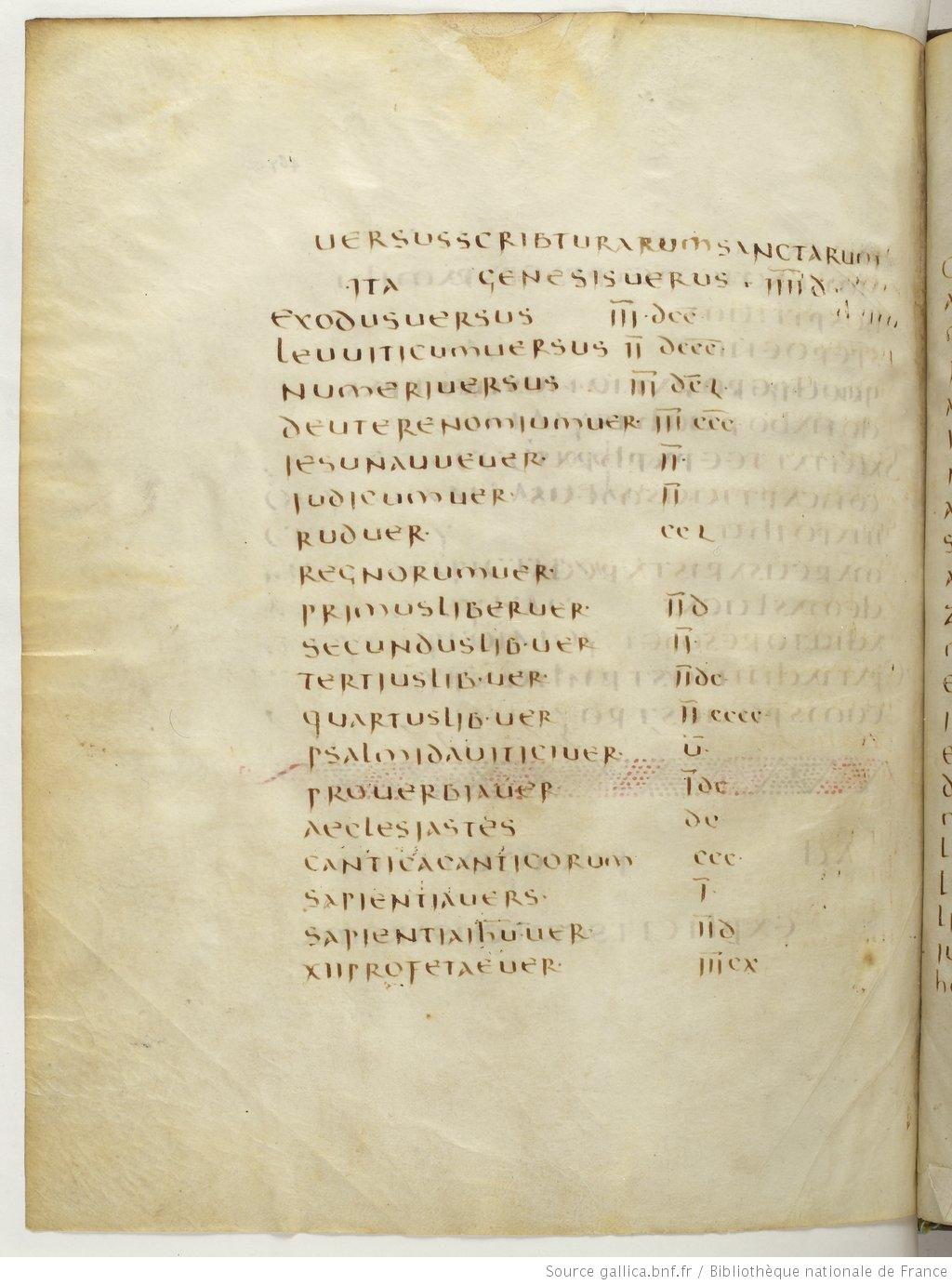
Catalogus Claromontanus part 1 (page 467 verso)

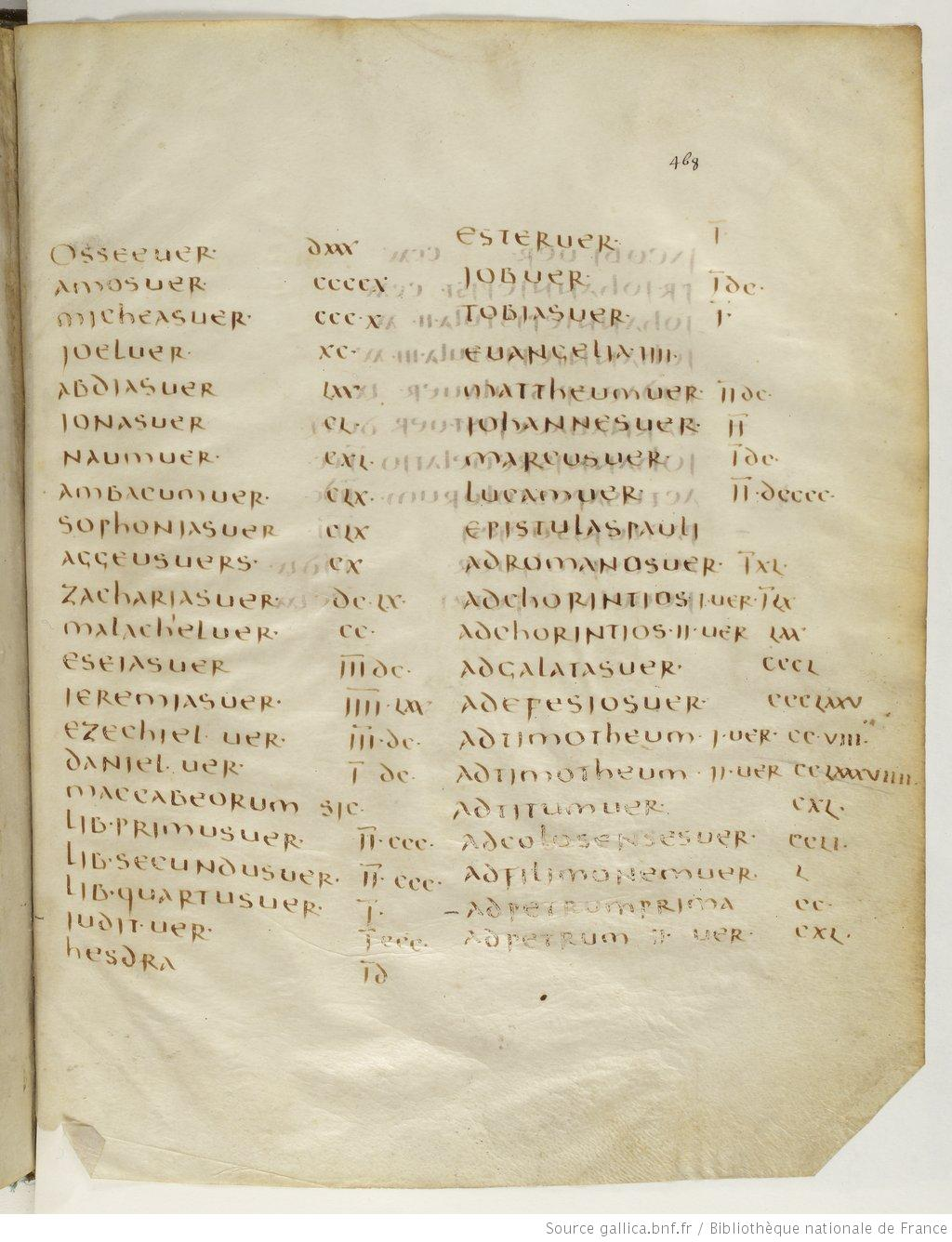
Catalogus Claromontanus part 2 (page 468 recto)

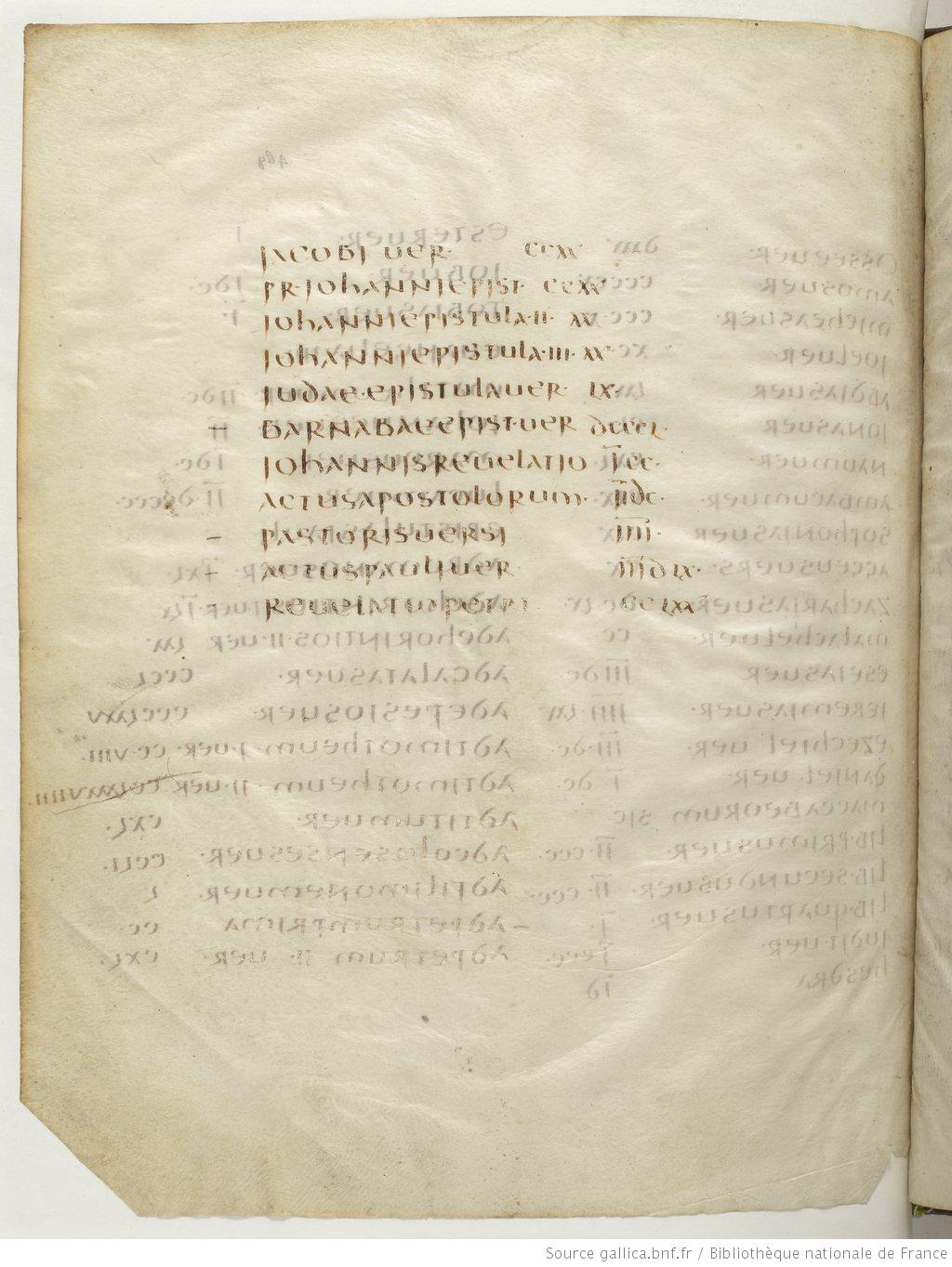
Catalogus Claromontanus part 3 (page 468 verso)

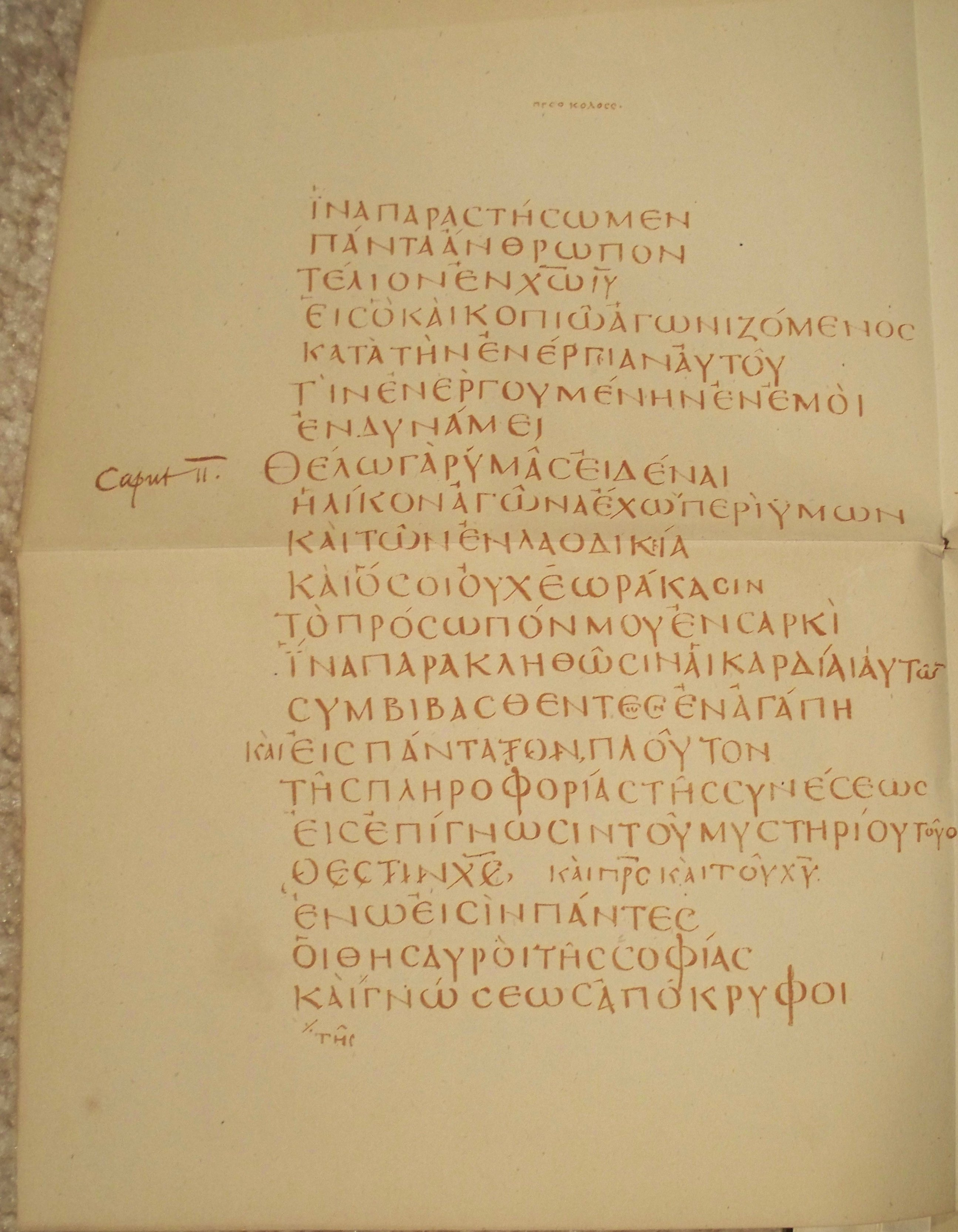
The Greek text of Colossians 1:28-2:3

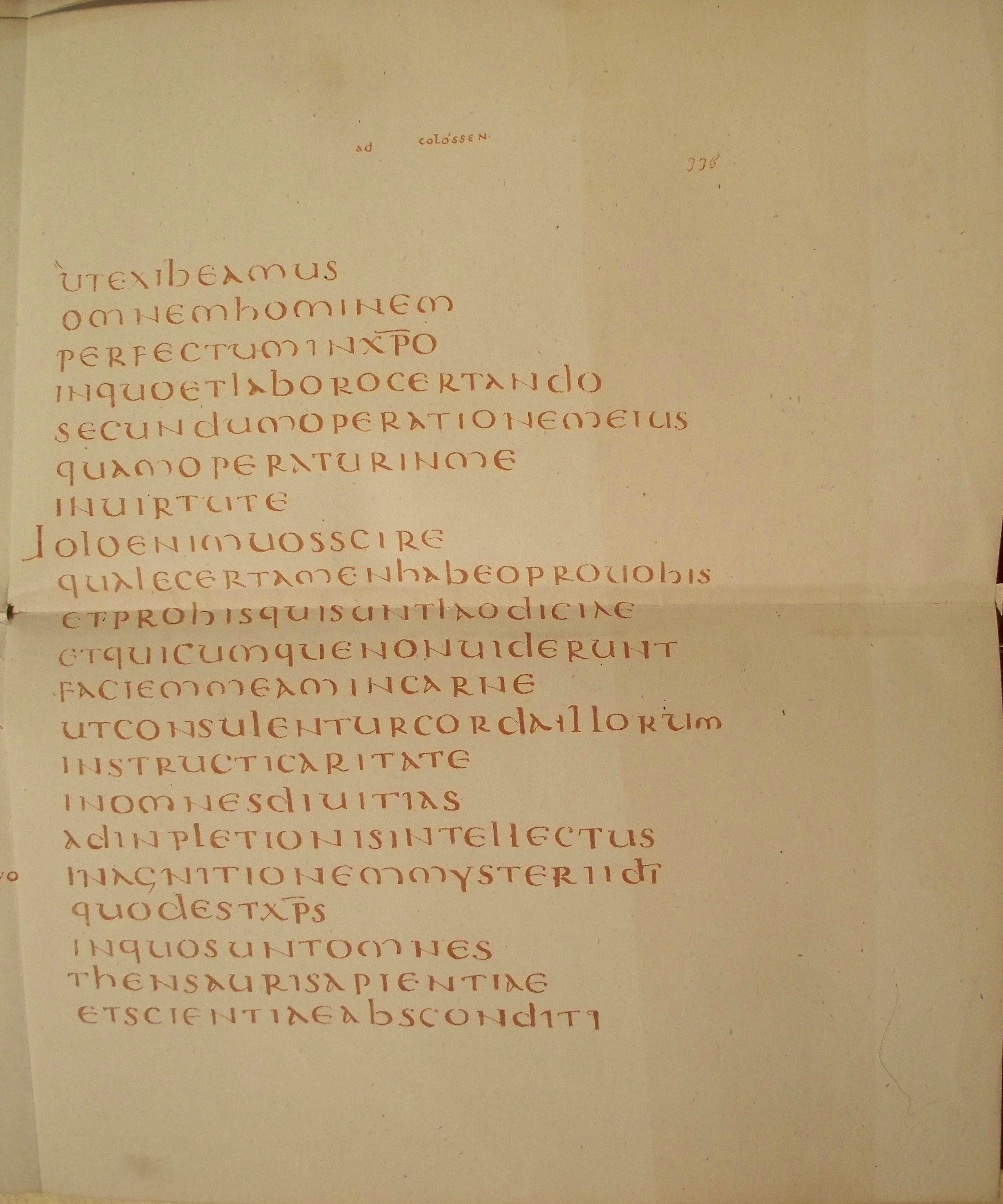
The Latin text of Colossians 1:28-2:3

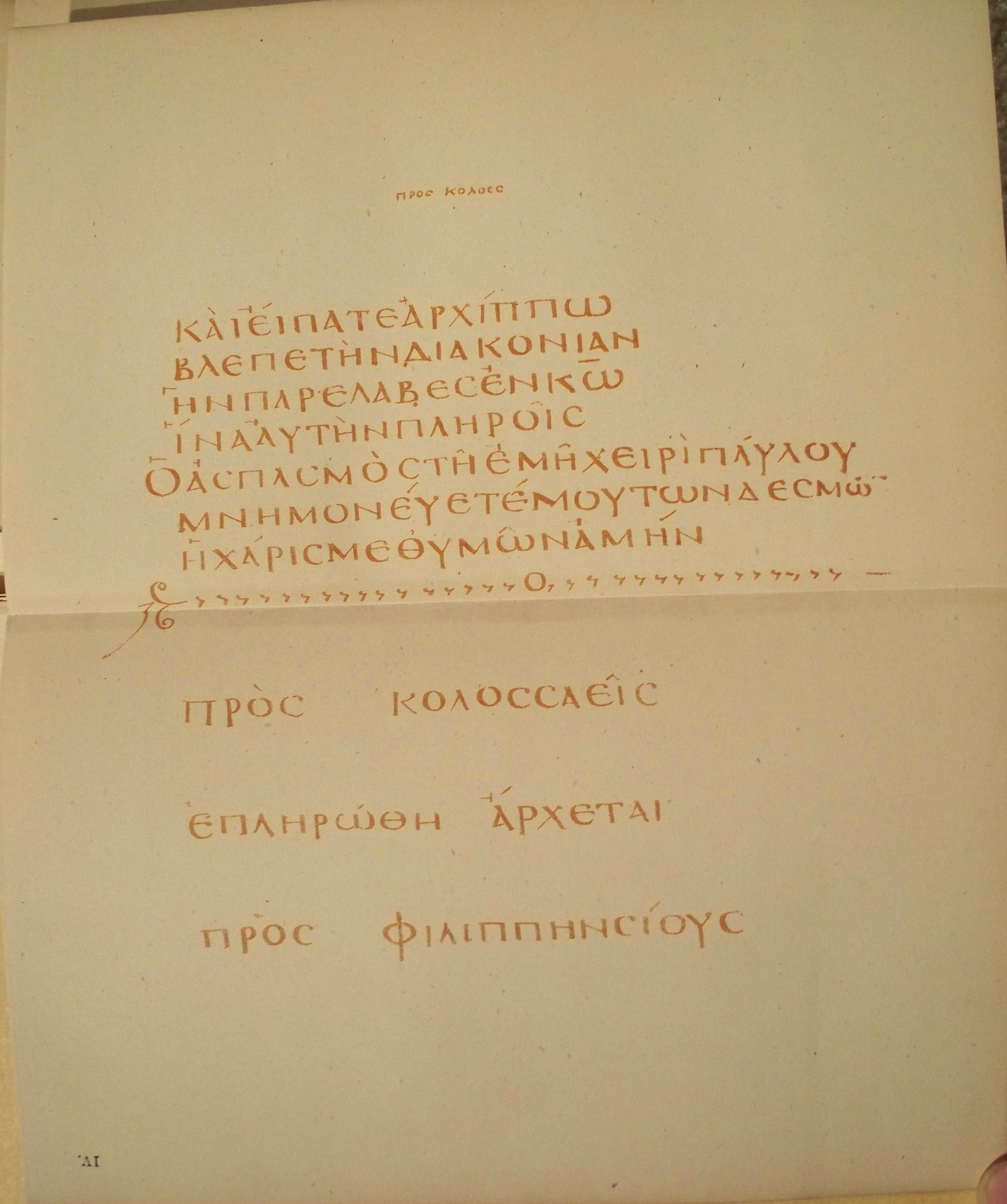
The Greek text of Colossians 4:17-18 (end)

== See also ==
- Codex Sangermanensis
- Uncial 0320
- List of New Testament uncials
- List of New Testament Latin manuscripts
- Textual criticism
