= Karahisar (disambiguation) =

Karahisar ("black castle" in Turkish) may refer to the following places in Turkey:

- Afyonkarahisar, a city in Afyon Province (formerly known as Karahisar-i Sahip, Afium-Kara-hissar, Afyon Karahisar)
- Şebinkarahisar, a district center in Giresun Province (formerly known as Kara Hisar-ı Şarkî, Şarkî Kara Hisar, Şapkarahisar)
- Karahisar, a town in Tavas district of Denizli Province
- Karahisar, Çorum
- Karahisar, Keşan
