= Guglielmo Cavallo =

Italian palaeographer (born 1938)

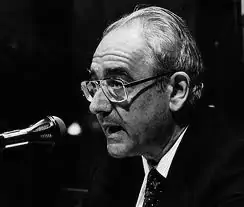
- Born: August 18, 1938 (age 88); Carovigno, Puglia
- Occupation: Palaeographer

Academic background
- Education: University of Bari
- Academic advisors: Alessandro Pratesi; Carlo Ferdinando Russo

Academic work
- Discipline: Classics
- Sub-discipline: Classical philology • Palaeography
- Institutions: Sapienza University

Guglielmo Cavallo (born 18 August 1938 in Carovigno) is an Italian palaeographer and Byzantinist, emeritus Professor of the Sapienza University of Rome.

== Life ==
Cavallo graduated from the University of Bari in 1961, tutored by Carlo Ferdinando Russo; shortly after, he became assistant of Alessandro Pratesi, then Professor of palaeography and diplomatic. In 1969, he moved to Rome and first became Research assistant in Greek Palaeography at the Special School for Archivists and Librarians (then Professor of Latin Palaeography since 1975), also teaching 'Storia della tradizione manoscritta' (History of the Manuscript Tradition) at the 'Sapienza' University of Rome. In 1978, he became Professor in Greek Palaeography at Sapienza. He retired from his teaching duties in 2008 and was nominated emeritus.

As of 2025, he is a member of the Comitato per l'edizione nazionale dei classici greci e latini (i.e. 'Committee for the National Edition of Greek and Latin Classical [Texts]') and of the scientific board of its periodical journal, the Bollettino dei Classici. He has served as the President of the former and as General Editor of the latter.

He is national fellow of the Accademia dei Lincei since 2002 and of the Accademia delle Scienze of Turin since 2016 (previously correspondent, 1996–2016).

== Research activity ==
Cavallo is one of the leading Italian palaeographers, specializing in papyrology, Greek and Latin writing of the Ancient and Medieval times and history of the manuscript tradition. His first major academic publication was an extensive study of Greek uncial (also known as 'Biblical uncial'). In 1974, he delivered a paper at the International Colloquium of Greek Palaeography held in Paris, proposing a new method for studying Greek uncial of the VIII–IX centuries. In 1983, Cavallo produced the first catalogue of Greek hands found in the Herculaneum papyri.

He examined and described Codex Basilensis A. N. III. 12 and dated it to the early 8th century. He examined Papyrus 39, Uncial 059, 0175, 0187, Lectionary 1386 and many other Greek manuscripts from the Byzantine period and organized and directed facsimile editions of Greek manuscripts such as the Codex Purpureus Rossanensis and the Dioscurides Neapolitanus and the 25th and the 19th volumes of the Chartae Latinae Antiquiores (ChLA). In 1997, with Giovanna Nicolaj, he founded the second series of the ChLA (Chartae Latinae Antiquiores series II – ChLA^{2}), containing volumes L to CXVI and voll. CXVII (appendix to Italy) and CXVIII (appendix to Switzerland, Luxembourg and Spain). He also edited facsimiles of Greek and Latin manuscripts and two collections of reproductions, with commentary, of Greek literary hands from the early Byzantine and Hellenistic periods, with H. Maehler. In 2008, he published a handbook of Greek and Latin Palaeography of papyri.

With Italian philologist Luca Canali he edited a collection of Roman epigraphs with translation and commentary; with Italian medievalist Giovanni Orlandi he edited the Histories of Rodulfus Glaber; in 2017, he wrote the introduction to the first volume of the Italian edition of Niketas Choniates' History. In 2023, he published a new, collected edition of the 'canons' or lists of exemplary Greek authors from the antiquity to Byzantium.

He authored and/or edited around 500 scientific works, some of which have been translated into foreign languages.

=== Reception of Cavallo's works by other scholars ===
In 1970, Paul Canart (then scriptor Graecus – i.e. conservator of Greek manuscripts – at the Vatican Library and one of the worldwide leading scholars in Greek palaeography) published an article praising Cavallo's work on Greek uncial. Ten years later, Armando Petrucci praised Cavallo as the "greatest specialist" in Greek Palaeography.

== Works ==
The complete bibliography up to 2004 can be found in Degni, Paola; Maniaci, Marilena, eds. (2004). Bibliografia degli scritti di Guglielmo Cavallo (1963-2004). I libri di Viella 39. Roma: Viella. ISBN 9788883341236.

=== Books ===
==== Editions of texts ====
- Canali, L.; Cavallo, G., eds. (1998) [1991]. Graffiti latini. Scrivere sui muri a Roma antica (II ed.). Milano: Rizzoli. ISBN 9788817172585.
- Rodulfus Glaber (2005) [I ed. 1989]. Cavallo, G.; Orlandi, G. (eds.). Cronache dell'anno Mille (Storie). Scrittori Greci e Latini (VIII ed.). Milan: Fondazione Lorenzo Valla – Mondadori. ISBN 8804298839.
- Cavallo, G., ed. (2023). Παραδείγματα. Le liste di autori greci esemplari dall'antichità a Bisanzio. Transmissions 8. Berlin – Boston: Walter De Gruyter GmbH. doi:10.1515/9783111027487. eISSN 2625-4026. ISBN 9783111027098. ISSN 2625-4018.

==== Facsimiles, specimina ====
- Cavallo, G.; Maehler, H., eds. (1987). Greek Bookhands of the Early Byzantine Period (A.D. 300–800). London: University of London – Institute of Classical Studies. ISBN 9780900587511.
- Cavallo, G.; Marichal, R.; Tjäder, J.-O., eds. (1986). Chartae Latinae Antiquiores. Vol. XXV = Italy 06. Dietikon – Zurich: URS Graf. ISBN 3-85951-149-1.
- Cavallo, G.; Gribomont, J.; Loerke, W. C., eds. (1985–1987). Codex purpureus Rossanensis. Museo dell'Arcivescovado, Rossano Calabro. Codices mirabiles 1. Roma – Graz: Salerno Editrice – Akademische Druck und Verlagsanstalt. ISBN 9788885026926.
- Cavallo, G.; Lilla, S.; Orofino, G., eds. (1988–1992). Erbario greco. Edizione integrale in facsimile del manoscritto Napoli, Biblioteca Nazionale, ex Vindob. Gr. 1. Codices mirabiles 2. Roma – Graz: Salerno Editrice – Akademische Druck und Verlagsanstalt. ISBN 8884020808.
- Cavallo, G.; Magistrale, F.; Tjäder, J.-O., eds. (1993). Chartae Latinae Antiquiores. Vol. XIX = Italy 10. Dietikon – Zurich: URS Graf. ISBN 3-85951-155-6.
- Cavallo, G.; Maehler, H., eds. (2008). Hellenistic Bookhands. Berlin – Boston: Walter de Gruyter GmbH. doi:10.1515/9783110210194. ISBN 9783110201246.

==== Monographs ====
===== Authored books =====
- Cavallo, G. (1967a). Ricerche sulla maiuscola biblica. Studi e Testi di Papirologia editi dall'Istituto Papirologico «G. Vitelli» dell'Università di Firenze 2. Firenze: Le Monnier. ISBN 9788800876155.
- Cavallo, G. (1973). Rotoli di Exultet dell'Italia Meridionale. Preface by A. Petrucci and including some contributions by C. Bertelli. Bari: Adriatica Editrice.
- Belting, H.; Cavallo, G. (1979). Der Bible des Niketas. Ein Werk der höfischen Buchkunst in Byzanz und sein antikes Vorbild. Wiesbaden: Reichert.
- Cavallo, G. (1983). Libri, scritture, scribi a Ercolano. Supplementi a Cronache Ercolanesi 1. Napoli: Gaetano Macchiaroli.
- Cavallo, G. (2002). Dalla parte del libro. Storie di trasmissione dei classici. Ludus philologiae 10. Urbino: Quattroventi. ISBN 9788839206237.
- Cavallo, G. (2005). Del Corso, L. (ed.). Il calamo e il papiro. La scrittura greca dall'età ellenistica ai primi secoli di Bisanzio. Papyrologica Florentina 36. Firenze: Libreria Antiquaria Gonnelli. ISBN 9788874680276.
- Cavallo, G. (2008). La scrittura greca e latina dei papiri. Una introduzione. Pisa – Roma: Fabrizio Serra Editore. ISBN 9788862270144.
- Cavallo, G. (2019). Scrivere e leggere nella città antica. Roma: Carocci. ISBN 9788843095827.

===== Edited books =====
- Cavallo, G., ed. (1982). I bizantini in Italia. Milano: Garzanti – Scheiwiller.
- Cavallo, G., ed. (1992) [1989]. Libri, editori e pubblico nel mondo antico. Guida storica e critica. Biblioteca Universale Laterza (II ed.). Roma – Bari: Laterza. ISBN 8842034959.
- Cavallo, G.; Chartier, R., eds. (1995). Storia della lettura nel mondo occidentale. Roma – Bari: Laterza. ISBN 9788842047544.
- Cavallo, G., ed. (1997). The Byzantines. Chicago: The University of Chicago Press. ISBN 9780226097923.
- Cavallo, G., ed. (2004). La cultura bizantina. Lo spazio letterario del Medioevo 3/1. Roma: Salerno Editrice. ISBN 9788884024565.

=== Papers, essays ===
Papers followed by (*) have been reprinted with addenda in Il calamo e il papiro (2005).

- Cavallo, G. (1963–1964). "La syrmografia e l'origine della minuscola greca". Bullettino dell'archivio Paleografico Italiano. 2–3: 105–8.
- Cavallo, G. (1965). "La scrittura del P. Berol. 11532: contributo allo studio dello stile di cancelleria nei papiri greci di età romana". Aegyptus. 45 (4/5): 216–49. JSTOR 41216069. (* 17–42)
- Cavallo, G. (1967b). "Osservazioni paleografiche sul canone e la cronologia della cosiddetta "onciale romana"". Annali della Scuola Normale Superiore di Pisa. Lettere, Storia e Filosofia. Series II. 36 (3/4): 209–220. JSTOR 24300180. (* 151–162)
- Cavallo, G. (1970). "La KOINH scrittoria greco-romana nella prassi documentale di età bizantina". Jahrbuch der österreichischen Byzantinistik. 19: 1–31. (* 43–72)
- Cavallo, G. (1973). "Considerazioni di un paleografo per la data e l'origine della "Iliade Ambrosiana"". Dialoghi di Archeologia. 7: 70–85. (* 163–174)
- Cavallo, G. (1975). "Γράμματα Ἀλεξανδρῖνα". Jahrbuch der österreichischen Byzantinistik. 24: 23–54. (* 175–202)
- Cavallo, G. (1977). "Funzione e strutture della maiuscola greca tra i secoli VIII-IX". La Paléographie grecque et byzantine. Paris 21-25 octobre 1974. Paris: Éditions du C.N.R.S. pp. 91–110.
- Cavallo, G. (1978). "Dal segno incompiuto al segno negato". Quaderni Storici. 38 (2): 466–87. JSTOR 43777864.
- Cavallo, G. (1981). "Il libro come oggetto d'uso nel mondo bizantino". Jahrbuch der österreichischen Byzantinistik. 31: 395–423.
- Cavallo, G. (1982). "Scritture italo-greche librarie e documentarie. Note introduttive ad uno studio correlato". Bisanzio e l'Italia. Raccolte di studi in memoria di Agostino Pertusi (in Italian). Milano: Vita e Pensiero. pp. 28–38.
- Cavallo, G. (1996). "David H. Wright, Der Vergilius Vaticanus. Ein Meisterwerk spätantiker Kunst, Akademische Druck- und Verlagsanstalt, Graz 1993 [review]". Mediaevistik. 9: 331–4. JSTOR 42584848.
- Cavallo, G. (2009). "Qualche riflessione su un rapporto difficile. Donne e cultura scritta nel mondo antico e medievale". Scripta. 2: 59–71. JSTOR 26490573.
- Cavallo, G.; Borghetti, M. N. (2001). "Le rossignol et l'hirondelle. Lire et écrire à Byzance, en Occident". Annales. Histoire, Sciences Sociales. 56 (4/5): 849–61. doi:10.3406/ahess.2001.279989. JSTOR 27586652. S2CID 161773524.
- Cavallo, G. (2012). "Per la data di P.Golenischev della "Cronaca universale alessandrina"". The Bulletin of the American Society of Papyrologists. 49: 237–40. JSTOR 24520038.
- Cavallo, G. (2013). "P.Mil. Vogl. I 19. Galeno e la produzione di libri greci a Roma in età imperiale". Segno e Testo. 11: 1–14.
- Cavallo, G.; Fioretti, P. (2014). "Chiaroscuro. Oltre l'angolo di scrittura (secoli I a.C. – VI d.C.)". Scripta. 7: 29–64. JSTOR 26484686.
- Cavallo, G. (2015). "Corpus delle iscrizioni bizantine e pratiche della cultura scritta: Note su questioni aperte e prospettive future". In Rhoby, A. (ed.). Inscriptions in Byzantium and Beyond: Methods - Projects - Case Studies. Wien: Austrian Academy of Sciences Press. pp. 93–106. doi:10.2307/j.ctv8d5td5.13. ISBN 978-3-7001-7806-4. JSTOR j.ctv8d5td5.13.
- Cavallo, G. (2017). "Stralci di storia di un gruppo di manoscritti greci del secolo IX". In Chiesa, P.; Fagnoni, A. M.; Guglielmetti, R. E. (eds.). Ingenio facilis. Per Giovanni Orlandi (1938-2007). Millennio Medievale 111. Strumenti e studi nuova serie 43. Firenze: SISMEL – Edizioni del Galluzzo. pp. 3–64. ISBN 9788884508003.
- Niketas Choniates (2017). Pontani, A.; van Dieten, J.-L. (eds.). Grandezza e catastrofe di Bisanzio. Scrittori Greci e Latini. Vol. 1. Milano: Fondazione Lorenzo Valla – Mondadori. pp. XVII–LVIII. ISBN 9788804664512.
