= Uncial 0322 =

- New Testament manuscript
- Text: Gospel of Mark †
- Date: 5th through 9th-century
- Script: Greek
- Now at: Ecumenical Patriarchate of Constantinople
- Size: 30.5 × 24 cm (12.0 × 9.4 in)
- Type: mixed
- Note: palimpsest

Uncial 0322 (in the Gregory-Aland numbering), is a Greek uncial manuscript of the New Testament, dated paleographically to the 8th or 9th-century.

== Description ==
The codex contains a small part of the Gospel of Mark 3:17/18-4:1; 6:10-21/22 on 2 parchment leaves of size 30.5 × 24 cm (12.0 × 9.4 in). The text is written in two columns per page, 22 lines per page. Rubrication is 8th–9th century; text is possibly 5th–7th century. It is a palimpsest, the upper text contains Synaxarion.

== History ==
The manuscript is dated to the 8th or 9th-century. It was added to the list of New Testament manuscripts by the INTF in 2010.

It is currently housed at the Ecumenical Patriarchate of Constantinople (Triados 68 (75)) in Istanbul.

== See also ==
- List of New Testament uncials
- Biblical manuscript
- Textual criticism
- Uncial 0321
