= Uncial 0320 =

- New Testament manuscript
- Name: Codex Waldeccensis
- Text: Epistle to the Ephesians †
- Date: 10th-century (?)
- Script: Greek/Latin
- Now at: Marburg
- Size: 36.8 × 22 cm (14.5 × 8.7 in)
- Type: Western

Uncial 0320 (in the Gregory-Aland numbering), is a diglot Greek-Latin uncial manuscript of the New Testament on parchment. Palaeographically it has been assigned to the 10th century. Formerly it was designated by D^{abs2}. The manuscript is very lacunose.

It is particularly notable as one of the two such copies which display clear evidence of having had Claromontanus as exemplar.

== Description ==
The codex contains a small texts of the Epistle to the Ephesians 1:3–9; 2:11–18, on six parchment leaves of size 36.8 × 22 cm (14.5 × 8.7 in). The text is written in one column per page, 42 lines per page.

The Greek text of the codex is a representative of the Western text-type. Kurt Aland placed it in Category III (Aland's Profile 139^{1} 30^{1/2} 44^{2} 35^{S}).

== History ==
Currently it is dated by the INTF to the 10th-century.

It is currently housed at the Hessisches Staatsarchiv Marburg (Best. 147 Hr. 2 Nr. 2, 6 fol.).

== See also ==
- List of New Testament uncials
- Biblical manuscript
- Textual criticism
