= Lectionary 245 =

Lectionary ℓ 245
- New Testament manuscript
- Text: Evangelistarium
- Date: 9th century
- Script: Greek
- Now at: Russian National Library
- Size: 28 cm by 22.3 cm

Lectionary 245, designated by siglum ℓ 245 (in the Gregory-Aland numbering) is a Greek manuscript of the New Testament, on parchment. Palaeographically it has been assigned to the 9th century. The manuscript has survived on only two leaves.

== Description ==
The codex contains lessons from the Gospels lectionary (Evangelistarium) and from the Book of Psalms. The first leaf contains lesson from Psalm 65, the second leaf with lesson from the Gospel of John.

The text is written in Greek uncial letters, on 2 parchment leaves (28 cm by 22.3 cm), in two columns per page, 20 lines per page.

== History ==
It has been assigned by the Institute for New Testament Textual Research to the 9th century.

Constantin von Tischendorf brought the manuscript from the East and gave first description of it. It was examined by Eduard de Muralt.

The manuscript was added to the list of New Testament manuscripts by Gregory (number 245).

The manuscript is not cited in the critical editions of the Greek New Testament (UBS3).

The codex is housed at the Russian National Library (Gr. 36) in Saint Petersburg.

== See also ==
- List of New Testament lectionaries
- Biblical manuscript
- Textual criticism
- Lectionary 246

== Bibliography ==
- Constantin von Tischendorf, Anecdota sacra et profana, p. XIV, 6
- Eduard de Muralt, Catalogue des manuscrits grecs de la Bibliothèque Impériale publique (Petersburg 1864), p. 22 (as XXXVII)
