= Minuscule 566 =

- New Testament manuscript
- Text: Gospel of Matthew, Gospel of Mark
- Date: 9th century
- Script: Greek
- Found: 1859, Tischendorf
- Now at: National Library of Russia
- Size: 21.5 cm by 17 cm
- Type: Byzantine/mixed
- Category: none

Minuscule 566 (in the Gregory-Aland numbering), ε 93 (Soden), also known as the Empress Theodora's Codex. It is a Greek minuscule manuscript of the New Testament, on parchment, dated palaeographically to the 9th century.

== Description ==
The codex contains the text of Gospel of Matthew and Gospel of Mark on 259 parchment leaves (size 21.5 cm by 17 cm). The text is written in two columns per page, 23 lines per page, in early minuscule letters.

It contains Epistula ad Carpianum, the Eusebian tables at the beginning, tables of the κεφαλαια before each Gospel, numbers of the κεφαλαια at the margin (chapters), the τιτλοι at the top (titles), the Ammonian Sections, (not the Eusebian Canons). It has the famous Jerusalem Colophon : ευαγγελιον κατα ματθαιον εγραφη και αντεβληθη εκ των ιεροσολυμοις παλαιων αντιγραφων των εν τω αγιω ορει αποκειμενων εν στιχοις βφιδ. κεφφ. τνε. There are some marginal notes in uncial letters were made.

It contains scholia at the margin in small uncial script. According to Tischendorf scholion to the Gospel of Matthew cites the Gospel of the Hebrews:

Matthew 4:5 το ιουδαικον ουκ εχει εις την αγιαν πολιν αλλ εν ιλημ
Matthew 16:17 Βαριωνα το ιουδαικον υιε ιωαννου
Matthew 18:22 το ιουδαικον εξης εχει μετα το εβδομηκοντακις επτα και γαρ εν τοις προφηταις μετα το χρισθηναι αυτους εν πνι αγιω ευρισκετω εν αυτοις λογος αμαρτιας
Matthew 26:47 το ιουδαικου και ηρνησατο και ωμοσεν και κατηρασατο.

Phrase "το ιουδαικου" probably means Gospel of the Hebrews.

== Text ==
The Greek text of the codex Aland did not place in any Category.

== History ==
De Muralt dated the manuscript to the 9th or 10th century. Currently it is dated by the INTF to the 9th-century.

The manuscript was brought by Constantin von Tischendorf in 1859. The manuscripts was examined and described by Tischendorf (along with the codices 565, 568-572, 574, 575, and 1567), by Tregelles, Eduard de Muralt, and Kurt Treu.

Formerly it was bounded in one manuscript with Codex Tischendorfianus III.

The codex now is located at the National Library of Russia (Gr. 54, 121 fol.; Gr. 282, 1 fol.) at Saint Petersburg.

== See also ==
- List of New Testament minuscules
- Purple parchment
- Textual criticism
