= Minuscule 565 =

Minuscule Greek manuscript of the New Testament

- New Testament manuscript
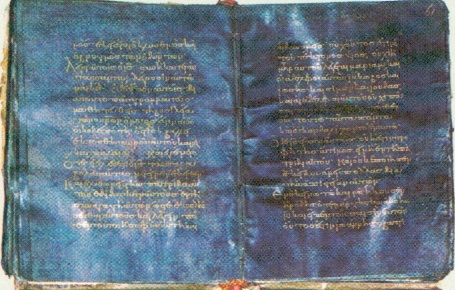
- Name: Empress Theodora's Codex
- Text: Gospels †
- Date: 9th century
- Script: Greek
- Now at: Russian National Library
- Size: 17.6 cm by 19.2 cm
- Type: Caesarean text-type
- Category: III
- Note: marginalia

Minuscule 565, also known as the Empress Theodora's Codex, is a Greek minuscule manuscript of the New Testament, written on purple parchment. It is designated by the siglum 565 in the Gregory-Aland numbering of New Testament manuscripts, and ε 93 in the von Soden numbering of New Testament manuscripts. Using the study of comparative writing styles (palaeography), it has been assigned to the 9th century. It was labelled by Biblical scholar Frederick H. A. Scrivener as 473. The manuscript has several gaps. It has marginalia.

== Description ==
The manuscript is a codex (precursor to the modern book format), containing the text of the four Gospels on 405 parchment leaves (17.6 by 19.2 cm), with some missing portions (Matthew 20:18-26, 21:45-22:9, Luke 10:36-11:2, 18:25-37, 20:24-26, John 11:26-48, 13:2-23, 17:1-12). It is one of only two known purple minuscules (minuscule 1143 is the other), written with gold ink. The text is written in one column per page, 17 lines per page. The text is divided according to the chapters (known as κεφαλαια / kephalaia), whose numbers are given in the margin, and the titles of the chapters (known as τιτλοι / titloi) written at the top of the pages in silver ink. There is also a division according to the Ammonian Sections, though no references to the Eusebian Canons (both being early methods of divinding the Gospels into sections, with the Eusebian being based on the Ammonian).

It contains the Eusebian tables, which were added by later hand. The tables of contents (also known as κεφαλαια) are placed before each of the four Gospels. It has the famous Jerusalem Colophon. The manuscript is similar to Beratinus 2 (Minuscule 1143).

== Text ==
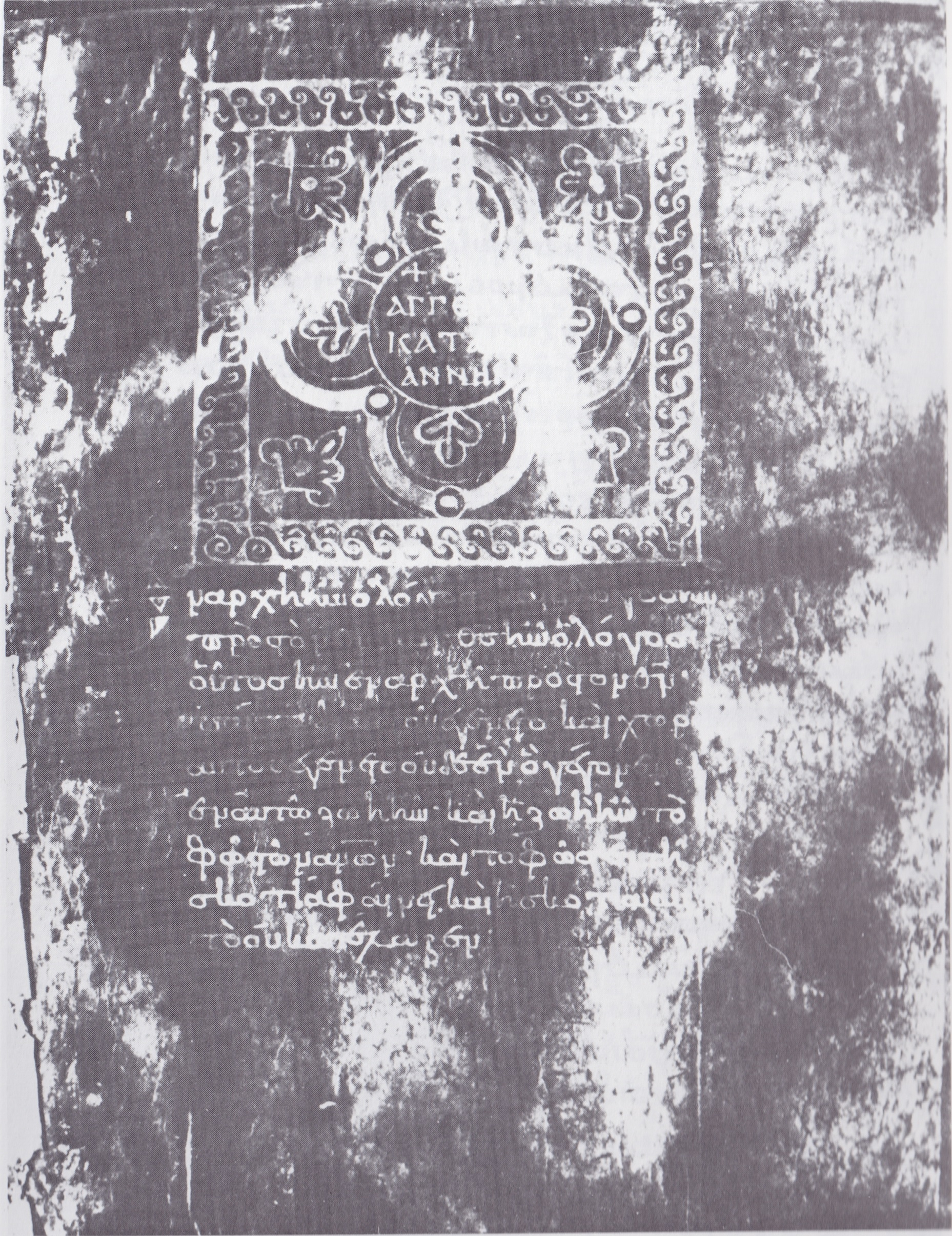
Minuscule 565 (Gregory-Aland)

The Greek text of the codex has been considered a representative of the so-called Caesarean text-type. The text-types are groups of different New Testament manuscripts which share specific or generally related readings, which then differ from each other group, and thus the conflicting readings can separate out the groups. These are then used to determine the original text as published; there are three main groups with names: Alexandrian, Western, and Byzantine. The Caesarean text-type however (initially identified by biblical scholar Burnett Hillman Streeter) has been contested by several text-critics, such as Kurt and Barbara Aland. Kurt Aland placed it in Category III of his New Testament manuscript classification system. Category III manuscripts are described as having "a small but not a negligible proportion of early readings, with a considerable encroachment of [Byzantine] readings, and significant readings from other sources as yet unidentified."

In the Gospel of Mark, this manuscript is closely aligned to the text seen in Codex Koridethi (Θ). According to Aland, the quality of the text is higher in the Gospel of Mark, however lower in Matthew and Luke. Minuscule 565 is considered a member of Family 1 in the Gospel of John.

According to the Claremont Profile Method (a specific analysis of textual data), it represents the Alexandrian text in Luke 1 and K^{x} in Luke 10 and Luke 20.

In John 1:29 it lacks ο Ιωαννης, a reading supported by the manuscripts א A B K M N S U Y Δ Θ Π Ψ Ω 047 0141 8 9 1192.

The entirety of John 14:14 is omitted, a reading supported by the manuscripts X f^{1} 1009 1365 ℓ 76 ℓ 253 it^{b} vg^{mss} syr^{s, pal} arm geo Diatessaron. It lacks the Pericope Adulterae (John 7:53-8:11), with an explanatory note.

== History ==
The manuscript comes from the area of the Black Sea, in Pontus. In 1829 it was brought to Saint Petersburg. The manuscript was examined and described by Eduard de Muralt, along with the codices 566, 568-572, 574, 575, and 1567. The text of Mark was edited in 1885 by Johannes Engebretsen Belsheim.

The manuscript is currently dated by the INTF to the 9th century. The codex is located at the Russian National Library (shelf number Gr. 53) at Saint Petersburg.

== See also ==
- List of New Testament minuscules
- Purple parchment
- Textual criticism
