= Kurt Treu =

Kurt Treu (15 September 1928 in Karja, Saare County, Estonia – 6 June 1991 in Vienna, Austria), was a German classical philologist. He was born the son of a German parson on the island Saaremaa, the largest island of Estonia. In 1940, because of World War II, the Treu family was forced to leave their homeland. Kurt Treu studied in a Gymnasium in Hohensalza. AS levels were studied by him after the war. He studied Classical philology at the University of Jena. In 1963 he graduated from the Humboldt University of Berlin.

== Works ==
- Griechisch-koptische Bilinguen des Neuen Testaments, in Koptische Studien in der DDR, edited by the Institut für Byzantinistik (Halle, 1965), pp. 95-123.
- Die griechischen Handschriften des Neuen Testaments in der UdSSR; eine systematische Auswertung des Texthandschriften in Leningrad, Moskau, Kiev, Odessa, Tbiblisi und Erevan. Texte und Untersuchungen. Vol. 91. Berlin. 1966.
- Neue Neutestamentliche Fragmente der Berliner Papyrussammlung, APF 18 (Berlin: 1966), pp. 23-38.
- Drei Berliner Papyri mit nomina sacra, Studia Patristica 10, T & U 30 (Berlin, 1970).
