= Eduard de Muralt =

Eduard de Muralt (1808–1895) was a Swiss-German professor of theology, a librarian, and a palaeographer.

He was born in Bischofszell, Switzerland, whose father was a dealer named Kaspar, and his mother Elizabeth Sprüngli. He studied theology in Zurich, completing his studies in 1832, and then studied philology and philosophy in Berlin, Jena and Paris. Muralt emigrated to Russia in 1834, taking over the German-Protestant parish of St. Petersburg (1836–1850). He was a librarian of the Imperial Hermitage, the National Library of Russiah (1840–1864), and described Greek manuscripts housed in the library. He also examined Codex Vaticanus in the Vatican Library.

He became private-docent in the University of Bern in 1864, and professor of theology in Lausanne in 1869. He became an Honorary Doctor causa of the faculty of theology of the University of Zurich in 1849.

== Works ==
- Catalogue des manuscrits grecs de la Bibliothèque Impériale publique [Catalogue of the Greek Manuscript from the Imperial Public Library]. Petersburg: Imperial Academy of Science. 1864.
