= Lectionary 60 =

Lectionary ℓ 60
- New Testament manuscript
- Text: Evangelistarion, Apostolos
- Date: 1021
- Script: Greek
- Now at: Bibliothèque nationale de France
- Size: 23.5 cm by 17 cm

Lectionary 60, designated by siglum ℓ 60 (in the Gregory-Aland numbering), is a Greek manuscript of the New Testament, on parchment leaves. It is a lectionary (Evangelistarion, Apostolos). It is dated by a colophon to the year 1021.

== Description ==
The codex contains lessons for selected days only from the Gospel of John, Gospel of Matthew, Gospel of Luke, and Acts of the Apostles. It is written in Greek minuscule letters, on 195 parchment leaves (23.5 cm by 17 cm). The text is written in one column per page, in 28 lines per page. It contains many valuable readings (akin to those of codices A, D, E), but with numerous errors. In Acts of the Apostles and Epistles it is close to ℓ 158.

In Mark 10:40 it has textual variant ητοιμασται παρα του πατρος instead of ητοιμασται (majority mss). Some manuscripts have ητοιμασται υπο του πατρος μου (א*^{, b}, (Θ παρα), f^{1} 1071 1241 it^{a}, it^{r^{1}} Diatessaron).

In Luke 15:21 it has additional reading ποιησον με ως ενα των μισθιων σου; the reading is supported by Sinaiticus, Vaticanus, Bezae, Monacensis, 33, 700, 1195, 1216, 1230, 1241, 1253, 1344, ℓ 13, ℓ 15, ℓ 80, ℓ 185.

In Acts 18:26 it reads την οδον του θεου along with 𝔓^{74}, א, A, B, 33, 88 181, 326, 436, 614, 2412, ℓ 1356.

In Acts 20:28 it reads θεου along with Sinaiticus, Vaticanus, Uncial 056, 0142, 104, 614, 629, 1505, 1877, 2412, 2495.

In Acts 27:16 it reads Κλαυδαν for Καυδα, this reading is supported by 88 and 104.

In Acts 28:1 it reads Μελιτηνη for Μελιτη.

== History ==
The manuscript was written by Helias, a priest and monk, "in castro Colonia", for the use of the French monastery of St. Denys. It belonged to the monastery Dionysius, then to de Thou, then to Colbert. It was examined by Moutfaucon. The manuscript was added to the list of New Testament manuscripts by Scholz.

It was examined and described by Henri Omont and Paulin Martin.

The manuscript is cited in the critical editions of the Greek New Testament (UBS3), it was used for the Editio Critica Maior.

Currently the codex is located in the Bibliothèque nationale de France, (Gr. 375) in Paris.

== See also ==
- List of New Testament lectionaries
- Biblical manuscript
- Textual criticism
