= Codex Cyprius =

Uncial 017
- New Testament manuscript
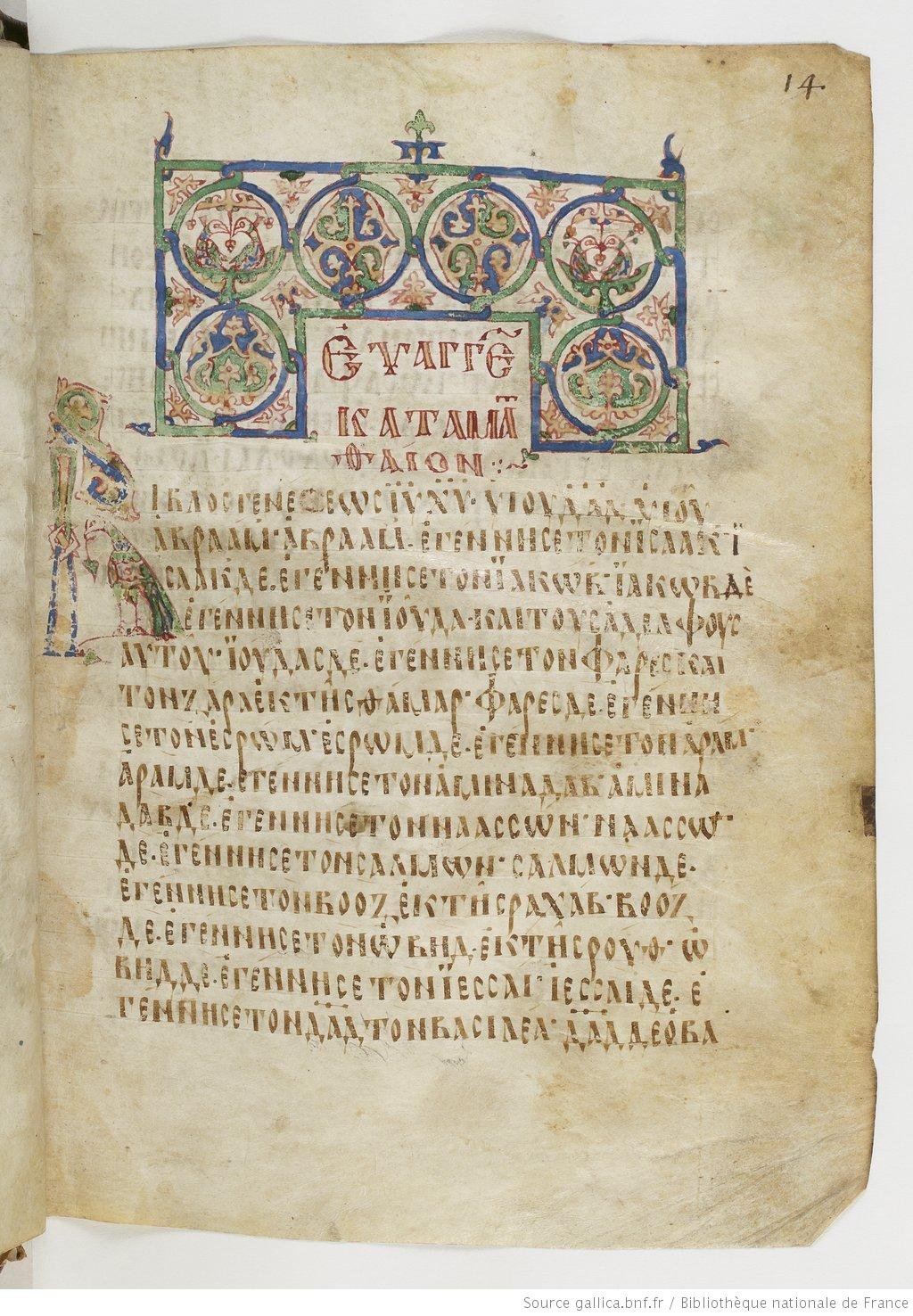
- Gospel of Matthew
- Name: Cyprius
- Sign: K^{e}
- Text: Gospels
- Date: 9th century
- Script: Greek
- Found: Cyprus 1673
- Now at: National Library of France
- Size: 26 cm by 19 cm
- Type: Byzantine text-type
- Category: V

Codex Cyprius, designated by K^{e} or 017 (in the Gregory-Aland numbering of New Testament Manuscripts), ε71 (in the von Soden numbering of New Testament manuscripts), or Codex Colbertinus 5149, is a Greek uncial manuscript of the four Gospels, written on parchment. It is one of the few uncial manuscripts with the complete text of the four Gospels, and it is one of the more important late uncial manuscripts. It was brought from Cyprus (hence the name of the codex) to Paris.

The text of the manuscript has been examined by many scholars. It is considered to mainly represent the Byzantine text-type (see Textual character below), but it has numerous peculiar readings. It has been variously dated from the 8th to the 11th centuries, but using the study of comparative writing styles (palaeography), it is currently dated to the 9th century.

== Description ==
The manuscript is a codex (precursor to the modern book), containing the complete text of the four Gospels written on 267 parchment leaves (sized 26 cm by 19 cm). The text itself is written in uncial letters of brown ink with one column per page. Each page contains 16 to 31 lines due to the handwriting being irregular and varying in size, with some pages having letters that are quite large. They are also upright, not round, and compressed. There is frequent insertion of an interpunction mark (·), and as it is sometimes in the wrong place for a stop, this has been supposed to occur in an ancient stichometrical style of writing (writing new sentences on new lines as opposed to continuing on the same line), from which this manuscript may have been copied. A dot is always used to denote the end of the phrase/line. It includes rough and smooth breathing marks (utilised to designate vowel emphasis), with accents (used to indicate voiced pitch changes) likely from the original scribe, but these are often omitted or incorrectly placed. The breathings are indicated by ⊢ and ⊣, these signs were often used in the codices from the 9th and 10th century. Errors of itacism (confusion of similar sounding letters) are very frequent. It contains lectionary markings (employed to indicate which passage is to read on a certain day in the year) in the margin, the Synaxarion (a list of Saint's days) on pages 1–18, with a Menologion (a list of readings to be read each calendar month), and the Eusebian Canons tables (an early system of dividing the four Gospels into different sections) on pages 19–28.

The nomina sacra (special names/words considered sacred in Christianity, abbreviated usually with the first and last letter, and notified with an overline) are employed throughout. The last letter is dependent upon case; the nominative case abbreviations are as follows: Α̅Ν̅Ο̅Σ̅ / ανθρωπος (man), Δ̅Α̅Δ̅ / δαυιδ (David), Θ̅Σ̅ / θεος (God), Ι̅Σ̅ / Ιησους (Jesus), Ι̅Λ̅Η̅Μ̅ / ιερουσαλημ (Jerusalem), Ι̅Η̅Λ̅ / ισραηλ (Israel), Κ̅Σ̅ / κυριος (Lord), Μ̅Η̅Ρ̅ / μητηρ (mother), Ο̅Υ̅Ν̅Ο̅Σ̅ / ουρανος (heaven), Ο̅Υ̅Ν̅Ι̅Ο̅Σ̅ / ουρανιος (heavenly), Π̅Η̅Ρ̅ / πατηρ (father), Π̅Ν̅Α̅ / πνευμα (spirit), Π̅Ν̅Ι̅Κ̅Ο̅Σ̅ / πνευματικος (spiritual), Σ̅Ρ̅Ι̅Α̅ / σωτηρια (salvation), Υ̅Σ̅ / υιος (son), Χ̅Σ̅ / χριστος (Christ/Messiah).

The text is divided according to the Ammonian Sections (Matthew has 359 sections, Mark 241, Luke 342, and John 232), whose numbers are given in the left margin of the text, and despite containing the Eusebian Canon tables at the beginning of the codex, references to the Eusebian Canons are absent. There was no other division according to the chapters (known as κεφαλαια / kephalaia) in the original codex, though it has their titles (known as τιτλοι / titloi) at the top of the pages, and the chapter tables before each Gospel. The chapter numbers were added by a later hand (Matthew has 68, Mark 48, Luke 83, and John 19). It contains subscriptions after each of first three Gospels.

Subscriptions
Gospel	Greek Subscription	English
Matthew	ευαγγελιον κατα ματθαιον στι(χοι) ,Β̅Ψ̅ το κατα ματθαιον εξεδοθη ευαγγελιον υπ αυτου εν ιεροσολυμοις μετα χρονους Η της του Χ̅Υ̅ αναληψεως.	Gospel according to Matthew; 2700 lines. The Gospel according to Matthew was written by him in Jerusalem, 8 years after the ascension of the Messiah.
Mark	ευαγγελιον κατα μαρκον στι(χοι) ,Α̅Ψ̅ το κατα μαρκον ευαγγελιον εξεδοθη μετα χρονους δεκα της του Χ̅Υ̅ αναληψεως	Gospel according to Mark; 1700 lines. The Gospel according to Mark was written ten years after the ascension of the Messiah.
Luke	ευαγγελιον κατα λουκαν στι(χοι) ,Β̅Ω̅ το κατα λουκαν ευαγγελιον εξεδοθη μετα χρονους Ι̅Ε̅ της του Χ̅Υ̅ αναληψεως.	Gospel according to Luke; 1702 lines. The Gospel according to Luke was written 15 years after the ascension of the Messiah.

=== Colophon ===
Near the end of the manuscript, on the reverse of page 267, there is a colophon (subscription) inserted by a second hand. According to this colophon the manuscript was written by a scribe named Basil, and it was bound by one Theodoulos, who commended themselves to the Virgin and St. Eutychios. Some parts of the colophon are uncertain.

The full text of the colophon is:

Colophon
Greek	English
εγραφη δε η δελτος αυτη δια χειρ[ ] Βασιλειου μοναχου ημφιασθην και εκεφ[ ]λεωθη υπ[.. Θε]οδουλου του μοναχου προσδεξητε αυτην η παναγια θ̅κ̅ο̅ς̅ και ο αγιος ευτυχιος κ̅ς̅ δε ο θ̅ς̅ δια πρεσβειων της υπερ[αγι]ας θ̅κ̅ο̅υ̅ και του αγιου Ευτυχιου χαρισηται ημιν την βασιλειαν των ο̅υ̅ν̅ων αιωνιζυσαν αμην:~	This manuscript was written by the hand of the monk Basil, it was bound and ... by ... the monk Theodoulos. May the Ever Holy Mother of God and Saint Eutychios accept this (manuscript). May the Lord God, through ambassadors of the Most Holy Mother of God and the Saint Eutychios, grant to us the kingdom of heaven for eternity. Amen.

== Text ==
=== Textual character ===
Gospel of Luke 20:9, in second line, between 11th and 12th letter stands stichometrical point

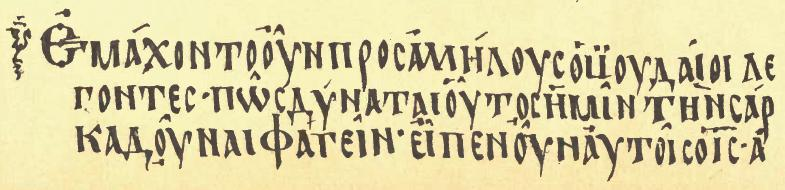
Gospel of John 6:52–53 in Scrivener's facsimile edition; it has the Ammonian section in the margin (ξς = 66)

The Greek text of this codex is considered a representative of the Byzantine text-type. The text-types are groups of different New Testament manuscripts which share specific or generally related readings, which then differ from each other group, and thus the conflicting readings can separate out the groups. These are then used to determine the original text as published; there are three main groups with names: Alexandrian, Western, and Byzantine. Together with Codex Petropolitanus (Π), the Codex Cyprius belongs to family Π, a group of manuscripts in close relationship to the text seen in Codex Alexandrinus (A). According to biblical scholar Samuel Prideaux Tregelles, it has many good and valuable readings, but according to biblical scholar Frederic Kenyon the text of the codex has no remarkable value, due to the manuscript being of a late date. According to biblical scholar Caspar René Gregory it has many old readings that preceded the Byzantine text-type. Textual critic Hermann von Soden classified it to the textual family I^{κa}, and associated the provenance of this text with Jerusalem.

Textual critic Silva Lake considered the text of the codex as a somewhat diluted form of family Π, with a large number of peculiar readings, most of which are either misspellings or careless and ignorant mistakes. According to her an educated scribe could hardly have produced the variants in Mark 4:1; Mark 6:26; Mark 9:4; Mark 13:3; Mark 14:38; or Mark 16:4. The readings it does not share with other Family Π representatives are supported outside the family, and they seem to be connected with the late Alexandrian group (C, L, M, N, Δ), but the number of Alexandrian readings is not high, and Silva Lake considered them as a result of accident as opposed to influence from a different text-type.

Textual critic Kurt Aland placed its text in Category V of his New Testament classification system. Category V manuscripts are described as having "a purely or predominantly Byzantine text." According to the Claremont Profile Method (a specific analysis method of textual data), its text belongs to the textual family Π^{a} in Luke 1, Luke 10, and Luke 20.

=== Some notable readings ===
Below are some readings of the manuscript which agree or disagree with variant readings in other Greek manuscripts, or with varying ancient translations of the New Testament. See the main article Textual variants in the New Testament.

Matt 27:34

οινον (wine) – K א B D L Θ ƒ^{1} ƒ^{13} 33
οξος (vinegar) – A W 0250 Byz (see Psalm 69:22). According to textual critic Johann Jakob Wettstein, the reading οινον came from the Latin versions.

Mark 10:19

μη αποστερησης (do not defraud)

omit – K B* W Ψ ƒ^{1} ƒ^{13} 28 700 1010 1079 1242 1546 2148 ℓ 10 ℓ 950 ℓ 1642 ℓ 1761 syr^{s} arm geo
incl. – B^{c1} Majority of manuscripts

Mark 10:47

Ναραιος (Naraios) – K*
Ναζωραιος (of Nazareth) – K^{c} Majority of manuscripts

Luke 9:55–56

στραφεις δε επετιμησεν αυτοις και ειπεν, Ουκ οιδατε ποιου πνευματος εστε υμεις; ο γαρ υιος του ανθρωπου ουκ ηλθεν ψυχας ανθρωπων απολεσαι αλλα σωσαι (but He turned and rebuked them and He said: "You do not know what manner of spirit you are of; for the Son of man came not to destroy men's lives but to save them) – K Π 1079 1242 1546 ƒ^{1} (omit γαρ) Θ ƒ^{13} (omit υμεις and γαρ)
omit – Majority of manuscripts

Luke 14:5

ὄνος ἢ βοῦς (an ass or an ox) – K א L X Π Ψ ƒ^{1} ƒ^{13} 33 892 1071, ℓ 547
υἱὸς ἢ βοῦς (a son or an ox) – Majority of manuscripts

John 3:19

αυτων πονηρα τα εργα (their works are evil) – K (singular reading)
πονηρα αυτων τα εργα (evil are their works) – Majority of manuscripts

John 7:8

εγω ουκ αναβαινω (I am not going) – K א D 1241 f
εγω ουπω αναβαινω (I am not yet going) – K B L T W Θ Ψ 0105 0180 0250 ƒ^{1} ƒ^{13} Majority of manuscripts

John 8:9

οι δε ακουσαντες και υπο της συνειδησεως ελεγχομενοι εξερχοντο εις καθ εις (They heard this, and being convicted by their conscience, began to leave one by one) – K E G H 1079 1365

John 8:10a

και μηδενα θεασαμενος πλην της γυναικος (and seeing no one except the woman) – K K^{r}
omit – D Γ 1 892 1010

John 8:10b

που εισιν εκεινοι οι κατηγοροι σου (Where are those accusers of yours?) – K (singular reading)
που εισιν οι κατηγοροι σου (Where are your accusers?) – E F G S U ƒ^{13} 28 225 700 1009 1079
που εισιν (Where are they?) – D M Γ Tischendorfianus III ƒ^{1}

== History ==
=== Discovery and further research ===
The early history of the codex is unknown. It was brought from Cyprus to the Colbert Library (no. 5149) in Paris in 1673, whence it passed into its present locality in the National Library of France.

The manuscript was examined by biblical critic Richard Simon, who made some extracts for textual critic John Mill, who used readings from the codex in his edition of Novum Testamentum Graecum (an edition of the Greek New Testament) in 1710. Palaeographer Bernard de Montfaucon published the first facsimile of a page from the codex containing the text of Matthew 2:19–22 in 1708, and used the manuscript for his palaeographical studies. Wettstein (for works published 1751-1752) employed readings from the codex, but with quite a large number of errors. Biblical scholar Johann M. A. Scholz valued it very highly, and he collated its text and noted its textual variants in 1820, but with so little care and numerous errors that his list is now ignored. Textual critic Constantin von Tischendorf produced a new collation in 1842, with Tregelles producing another independent collation in 1849, and in 1850 they compared their collations in Leipzig, and created a new list. Its textual variants are cited in Tischendorf's Editio Octava Critica maior (a critical edition of the Greek New Testament). Scrivener published a facsimile with the text of John 6:52–53 in 1861. Historian Henri Omont and New Testament scholar William Hatch published some fragments of the codex in separate facsimile samples in 1892 and 1896 respectively.

The manuscript was also examined and described by biblical scholar Bianchini in 1749, and Caspar René Gregory, who saw the codex in 1883.

Wettstein believed the text of the codex was altered by influence from Old Latin manuscripts. Hatch stated the manuscript is "one of the more important of the later uncial manuscripts of the four Gospels".

=== Dating ===
Richard Simon dated the manuscript to the 10th century. According to Montfaucon and Scholz, it was written in the 8th century. According to biblical scholar Leonard Hug it is not older than the ninth century, as several of the letter-forms in the manuscript have not been found in any other manuscript securely dated to before the 9th century.

Tischendorf and Gregory dated the manuscript to the 9th century. Tregelles dated the manuscript to the middle of the ninth century. Kenyon stated the manuscript must be not earlier than the 11th century, due to the formal liturgical hand and on palaeographic grounds. But Kenyon only saw Scrivener's facsimile, and his assessment was made only on the basis of this facsimile text.

Omont advised it is impossible to give a precise date to this manuscript on palaeographical grounds, as there are many manuscripts written in the same style of handwriting, but they are not dated. The 9th century is just as possible as well as the 11th century.

Lake proclaimed it is difficult to prove it was written earlier than the year 1000, and it is perhaps as late as the middle of the eleventh century. This assessment was based rather on the textual dependency from other manuscript members of family Π, than on palaeographical grounds. According to Lake, Minuscule 1219 represents a text of family Π in its earlier stage as opposed to Codex Cyprius. Cyprius could have been copied from Minuscule 1219, or from a copy of Minuscule 1219 (Silva Lake's hypothetical codex b). Minuscule 1219 can hardly have written before the year 980 or long after 990, and so as a result Codex Cyprius can hardly be dated long before the year 1000.

Hatch argued the letters Β, Δ, Κ, Λ, Μ, Ξ, Π, Υ, Φ, Χ, Ψ, and Ω have forms which are characteristic of the late 10th or the early 11th century CE. Hatch also noted the handwriting of the codex bears a striking general resemblance to that of three Gospel lectionaries of the 10th and 11th centuries: ℓ 3, ℓ 296, and ℓ 1599. On the other hand, no such likeness exists between the codex and uncial manuscripts of the New Testament which were written in the 9th century. As such, Hatch argued the manuscript should be dated to about 1000.

Kenyon, Kurt Aland and biblical scholar Bruce Metzger dated it to the 9th century. The manuscript is now dated by the Institute for New Testament Textual Research (INTF) to the 9th century.

The codex is currently located in the National Library of France (Gr. 63) in Paris.

== See also ==
- Biblical manuscript
- List of New Testament uncials
- Textual criticism
