= Lectionary 2 =

Lectionary ℓ 2
- New Testament manuscript
- Text: Evangelistarion
- Date: 10th century
- Script: Greek
- Now at: Bibliothèque nationale de France
- Size: 28.6 cm by 21.8 cm

Lectionary 2, designated siglum ℓ 2 (in the Gregory-Aland numbering), is a Greek manuscript of the New Testament on vellum. Palaeographically it has been assigned to the 10th century. Formerly it was variously dated. Scrivener dated it to the 9th century, Henri Omont to the 14th century, Gregory to the 10th century. In the present day it is unanimously dated to the 10th century.

== Description ==
The codex contains lessons from the Gospels lectionary (Evangelistarium) with some lacunae. The text is written in Greek uncial letters, on 257 parchment leaves (28.6 cm by 21.8 cm), 2 columns per page, 18 lines per page. It has musical notes.

== History ==
The manuscript once belonged to Colbert. It was examined and described by Wettstein and Scholz, Paulin Martin, Henri Omont, and William Hatch. C. R. Gregory saw the manuscript in 1885.

It was added to the list of the New Testament manuscripts by Wettstein.

The manuscript is not cited in the critical editions of the Greek New Testament of UBS (UBS3).

The codex now is located in the Bibliothèque nationale de France (Gr. 280) in Paris.

== See also ==
- List of New Testament lectionaries
- Biblical manuscript
- Textual criticism

== Bibliography ==
- Henri Omont, Fac-similés des plus anciens mss. grecs de la Bibliothèque Nationale du IVe and XIVe siècle (Paris, 1892), 19.
- W. H. P. Hatch, Facsimiles and descriptions of minuscule manuscripts of the New Testament, LXXIII (Cambridge, 1951).
