= Minuscule 1253 =

New Testament Greek minuscule manuscript

- New Testament manuscript
- Text: Gospels †
- Date: 15th century
- Script: Greek
- Now at: Saint Catherine's Monastery
- Size: 30 cm by 23 cm
- Category: none
- Note: unique addition in the Lord's Prayer

Minuscule 1253 (in the Gregory-Aland numbering), Θ^{ε64} (von Soden). It is a Greek minuscule manuscript of the New Testament on paper. Palaeografically it has been assigned to the 15th century (or about 1200). The manuscript is lacunose.

== Description ==
The codex contains the text of the four Gospels with a commentaries of Theophylact, written on 209 paper leaves (30 cm by 23 cm). It has two lacunae in Matthew 1:1-2; John 9:3-21.25. The text is written in two columns per page, in 36 and more lines per page. It contains pictures.

== Text ==
Aland did not place its text into any Category. According to the Claremont Profile Method it has mixed text in Luke 1, Luke 10, and Luke 20.

In Matthew 6:13, in the Lord's Prayer it has unique addition ὅτι σοῦ ἐστιν ἡ βασιλεία, τοῦ πατρὸς καὶ τοῦ υἱοῦ καὶ τοῦ ἁγίου πνεύματος εἰς τοὺς αἰῶνας. ἀμήν.

In Matthew 19:16 it reads διδασκαλε αγαθε (good teacher) — C, K, W, Δ, Θ, f^{13}, 28, 33, 565, 700, 892^{mg}, 1009, 1071, 1079, 1195, 1216, 1230, 1241, 1242, 1344, 1546, 1646, 2148, 2174, Byz, Lect, it, vg, syr, cop^{sa}, arm, eth, Diatessaron.

In Luke 15:21 it has additional reading ποιησον με ως ενα των μισθιων σου; the reading is supported by Sinaiticus, Vaticanus, Bezae, Monacensis, 33, 700, 1195, 1216, 1230, 1241, 1344, ℓ 13, ℓ 15, ℓ 60, ℓ 80, ℓ 185.

It contains text of Luke 22:43-44 (Christ's agony).

In John 6:1 it reads της θαλασσης της Γαλιλαιας εις τα μερη της Τιβεριαδος – along with Codex Bezae, Θ, 892, 1009, 1230.

== History ==
According to Victor Gardthausen, the manuscript was written in the 16th century. Currently it is dated by the INTF to the 15th century.

Nothing is known concerning the history of the codex until the year 1886, when it was seen by Victor Gardthausen, a German palaeographer, who first described the codex.

On the basis of Gardthausen description, C. R. Gregory added it to his list of the New Testament manuscripts.

The codex is currently located in the Saint Catherine's Monastery (Shelf number Gr. 303), at Sinai.

== See also ==
- List of New Testament minuscules (1001–2000)
- Biblical manuscript
- Textual criticism
