= Lectionary 64 =

Lectionary ℓ 64
- New Testament manuscript
- Text: Evangelistarion
- Date: 9th-century
- Script: Greek
- Now at: Bibliothèque nationale de France
- Size: 27.8 cm by 20.2 cm

Lectionary 64, designated by siglum ℓ 64 (in the Gregory-Aland numbering), is a Greek manuscript of the New Testament, on parchment leaves. It is a lectionary (Evangelistarion). Palaeographically it has been assigned to the 9th-century.

== Description ==
The codex contains lessons from the Gospel of John, Gospel of Matthew, and Gospel of Luke with lacunae at the beginning and end. It is written in Greek uncial letters, on 210 parchment leaves (27.8 cm by 20.2 cm). The writing stands in two columns per page, in 22 lines per page. Many leaves are torn.

== History ==
The manuscript came from Constantinople. It was added to the list of New Testament manuscripts by Scholz, who examined many of its passages. It was examined by Paulin Martin and Henri Omont.

The manuscript is sporadically cited in the critical editions of the Greek New Testament (UBS3).

Currently the codex is located in the Bibliothèque nationale de France (Gr. 281), in Paris.

== See also ==
- List of New Testament lectionaries
- Biblical manuscript
- Textual criticism
