= Lectionary 25 =

Lectionary ℓ 25
- New Testament manuscript
- Text: Evangelistarion
- Date: 13th-century
- Script: Greek
- Now at: British Library
- Size: 24.2 cm by 15.9 cm

Lectionary 25, designated by siglum ℓ 25 (in the Gregory-Aland numbering) is a Greek manuscript of the New Testament, on vellum leaves. Palaeographically it has been assigned to the 13th-century.

== Description ==
The codex contains lessons from the Gospels of John, Matthew, Luke lectionary (Evangelistarium), with lacunae. It is written in Greek minuscule letters, on 159 parchment leaves (24.2 cm by 15.9 cm), in 1 column per page, 21-23 lines per page.

It is a palimpsest in some parts, the lower earlier text written partly by minuscule, partly by uncial hand. This text is illegible and still unidentified.

== History ==
The text of the lectionary (later text of the palimpsest) was written by Nicephorus at the behest of Nicholas Presbyter.

The codex was merely examined by Griesbach, Bloomfield, and Henri Omont. Gregory saw it in 1883.

The manuscript is not cited in the critical editions of the Greek New Testament (UBS3).

Currently the codex is located in the British Library (Harley MS 5650).

== See also ==
- List of New Testament lectionaries
- Biblical manuscript
- Textual criticism
