= Lectionary 3 =

Lectionary ℓ 3
- New Testament manuscript
- Text: Evangelistarion †
- Date: 11th century
- Script: Greek
- Now at: Lincoln College
- Size: 29 cm by 22.5 cm

Lectionary 3, designated siglum ℓ 3 (in the Gregory-Aland numbering), is a Greek manuscript of the New Testament on vellum. Palaeographically it has been assigned to the 11th century. Scrivener dated to the 10th century.

== Description ==
The codex contains lessons from the Gospels of John, Matthew and Luke lectionary (Evangelistarium) with lacunae. The text is written in Greek uncial letters, on 281 parchment leaves (29 cm by 22.5 cm), 2 columns per page, 19 lines per page. Three leaves at the end lost. It contains coloured and gilt illuminations and capitals, and red crosses for stops. It contains a full menologion.

The style of handwriting of this codex bears a striking general resemblance to that of three Gospel manuscripts of the 10th and 11th centuries: Codex Cyprius, Lectionary 296, and ℓ 1599.

== History ==
The manuscript once belonged to Alexander from Corinth. The manuscript was brought to England from Zante by the botanist and early traveller Sir George Wheler in 1676 with two other documents (68 and 95).

It was examined by John Mill, Wettstein, Scholz, and William Hatch. It was added to the list of the New Testament manuscripts by Wettstein.

The manuscript is not cited in the critical editions of the Greek New Testament of UBS (UBS3).

The codex is now in Lincoln College, Oxford (Gr. II. 15).

== See also ==
- List of New Testament lectionaries
- Biblical manuscript
- Textual criticism

== Bibliography ==
- W. H. P. Hatch, Facsimiles and descriptions of minuscule manuscripts of the New Testament, LXXII (Cambridge, 1951).
