= Uncial 0303 =

- New Testament manuscript
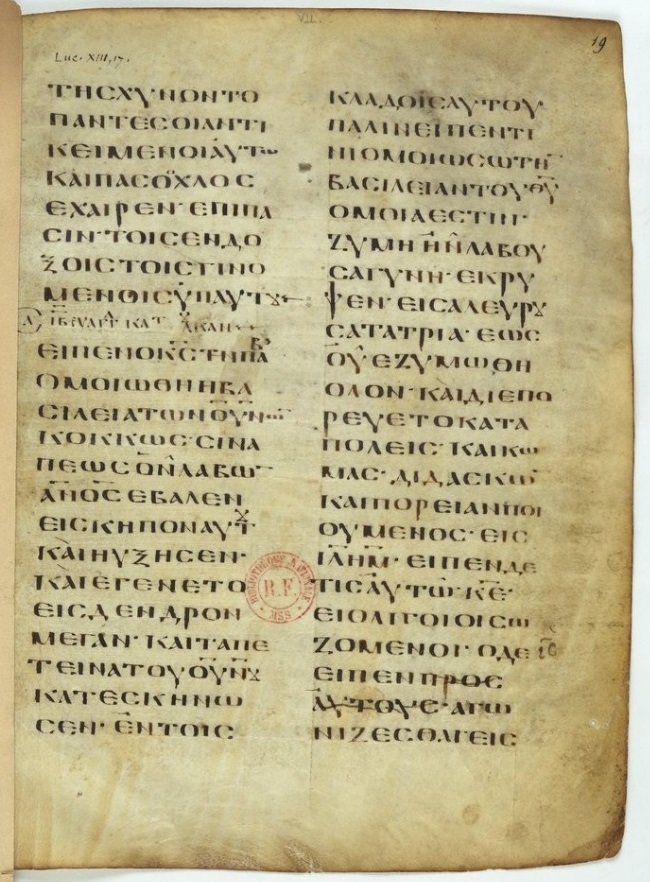
- Text: Luke 13:17-29
- Date: 7th century
- Script: Greek
- Now at: Bibliothèque nationale de France
- Size: 26.2 x 19.5 cm

Uncial 0303 (in the Gregory-Aland numbering), is a Greek uncial manuscript of the New Testament. Paleographically it has been assigned to the 7th century.

== Description ==
The codex contains the text of the Gospel of Luke 13:17- 29, on 1 parchment leaf (26.2 cm by 19.5 cm). It is written in two columns per page, 23 lines per page, in uncial letters. Formerly it was classified as lectionary 355 (ℓ 355).

It was examined by Henri Omont.

Currently it is dated by the INTF to the 7th century.

It is currently housed at the Bibliothèque nationale de France (Supplément grec 1155 VII, fol. 19) in Paris.

== See also ==
- List of New Testament uncials
- Biblical manuscripts
- Textual criticism
