= Lectionary 72 =

Lectionary ℓ 72
- New Testament manuscript
- Text: Evangelistarion
- Date: 13th-century
- Script: Greek
- Now at: Bibliothèque nationale de France
- Size: 25 cm by 19.3 cm

Lectionary 72 is a Greek manuscript of the New Testament, on vellum leaves. It is designated by siglum ℓ 72 (in the Gregory-Aland numbering). Palaeographically it has been assigned to the year 13th-century.

== Description ==
The codex contains lessons from the Gospels of John, Matthew, Luke's lectionary (Evangelistarium). The text is written in Greek minuscule letters, on 187 parchment leaves (25 cm by 19.3 cm), 2 columns per page, 20-29 lines per page.

Three first leaves of the volume came from another manuscript written in the 9th-century in uncial letters. It is another lectionary ℓ 1358.

== History ==
The manuscript was written by Nicolas. According to the colophon it was written in 1275.

It was partially examined and described by Scholz and Paulin Martin. Henri Omont made a new description of the codex. C. R. Gregory saw it in 1885.

The manuscript is not cited in the critical editions of the Greek New Testament (UBS3).

Currently the codex is located in the Bibliothèque nationale de France (Gr. 290, fol. 4-190) in Paris.

== See also ==
- List of New Testament lectionaries
- Biblical manuscript
- Textual criticism

== Bibliography ==
- Henri Omont, Fac-similés des plus anciens manuscrits grecs de la Bibliothèque Nationale du IVe et XIIIe siècle (Paris, 1892), 20.
