= Lectionary 15 =

Lectionary ℓ 15
- New Testament manuscript
- Text: Gospels
- Date: 13th-century
- Script: Greek
- Now at: Bibliothèque nationale de France
- Size: 25.6 cm by 19.1 cm

Lectionary 15, designated by siglum ℓ 15 (in the Gregory-Aland numbering). It is a Greek manuscript of the New Testament, on vellum leaves. Palaeographically it has been assigned to the 13th-century.

== Description ==
The codex contains lessons from the Gospels of John, Matthew, Luke lectionary (Evangelistarium) with some lacunae. It is written in Greek minuscule letters, on 310 parchment leaves (25.6 cm by 19.1 cm), 2 columns per page, 22 or 23 lines per page.

In Luke 15:21 it has additional reading ποιησον με ως ενα των μισθιων σου; the reading is supported by Sinaiticus, Vaticanus, Bezae, Monacensis, 33, 700, 1195, 1216, 1230, 1241, 1253, 1344, ℓ 13, ℓ 60, ℓ 80, ℓ 185.

The manuscript was slightly examined by Scholz, Paulin Martin, and C. R. Gregory in 1885.

It was added to the list of the New Testament manuscripts by Johann Jakob Wettstein. The manuscript is sporadically cited in the critical editions of the Greek New Testament (UBS3).

Currently the codex is located in the Bibliothèque nationale de France (Gr. 302) in Paris.

== See also ==
- List of New Testament lectionaries
- Biblical manuscript
- Textual criticism

== Bibliography ==
- Gregory, Caspar René (1900). Textkritik des Neuen Testaments. Vol. 1. Leipzig: J.C. Hinrichs'sche Buchhandlung. p. 388.
