= Lectionary 63 =

Lectionary ℓ 63
- New Testament manuscript
- Text: Evangelistarion
- Date: 9th-century
- Script: Greek
- Now at: Bibliothèque nationale de France
- Size: 28.6 cm by 20.9 cm

Lectionary 63, designated by siglum ℓ 63 (in the Gregory-Aland numbering), is a Greek manuscript of the New Testament, on parchment leaves. It is a lectionary (Evangelistarion). Palaeographically it has been assigned to the 9th-century.

== Description ==
The codex contains lessons from the Gospel of John, Gospel of Matthew, and Gospel of Luke with lacunae at the beginning and end. It is written in Greek uncial letters, on 158 parchment leaves (28.6 cm by 20.9 cm). The writing stands in two columns per page, in 22 lines per page.

== History ==
The manuscript was added to the list of New Testament manuscripts by Scholz. It was examined by Henri Omont and Paulin Martin. C. R. Gregory saw it in 1885.

The manuscript is sporadically cited in the critical editions of the Greek New Testament (UBS3).

Currently the codex is located in the Bibliothèque nationale de France (Gr. 277), in Paris.

== See also ==
- List of New Testament lectionaries
- Biblical manuscript
- Textual criticism
