= Lectionary 13 =

Lectionary ℓ 13
- New Testament manuscript
- Text: Gospels
- Date: 12th-century
- Script: Greek
- Now at: Bibliothèque nationale de France
- Size: 37 cm by 25.7 cm
- Hand: beautifully written

Lectionary 13, designated by siglum ℓ 13 (in the Gregory-Aland numbering). It is a Greek manuscript of the New Testament, on vellum leaves. Palaeographically it has been assigned to the 12th-century. Formerly it was known as Colbertinus 1241 or Regius 1982.

== Description ==
The codex contains lessons from the Gospels of John, Matthew, Luke lectionary (Evangelistarium). The text is written in Greek uncial letters, on 283 parchment leaves (37 cm by 25.7 cm), 2 columns per page, 18 lines per page, 11-14 letters per line. The codex is one of the most beautifully written. The first seven pages in gold, the next fifteen in vermillon, the rest in black ink. It contains pictures.

In Matthew 23:35 phrase υιου βαραχιου (son of Barachi'ah) is omitted; this significant omission is supported only by Codex Sinaiticus, 59 (by the first hand), two other Evangelistaria (ℓ 6 and ℓ 185), and Eusebius.

In Luke 15:21 it has additional reading ποιησον με ως ενα των μισθιων σου; the reading is supported by Sinaiticus, Vaticanus, Bezae, Monacensis, 33, 700, 1195, 1216, 1230, 1241, 1253, 1344, ℓ 15, ℓ 60, ℓ 80, ℓ 185.

== History ==
Formerly it was held in the Mount Athos. Currently the codex is located in the Bibliothèque nationale de France (Fonds Coislin, Gr. 31) in Paris.

The manuscript is sporadically cited in the critical editions of the Greek New Testament (UBS3).

It was added to the list of the New Testament manuscripts by Wettstein. It was examined by Scholz, and Paulin Martin. Gregory saw it in 1885. Constantin von Tischendorf confused it with Lectionary 17.

== See also ==
- List of New Testament lectionaries
- Biblical manuscript
- Textual criticism

== Bibliography ==
- Bernard de Montfaucon, Biblioteca Coisliniana (Paris, 1715), pp. 84 ff.
