= Lectionary 296 =

Lectionary ℓ 296
- New Testament manuscript
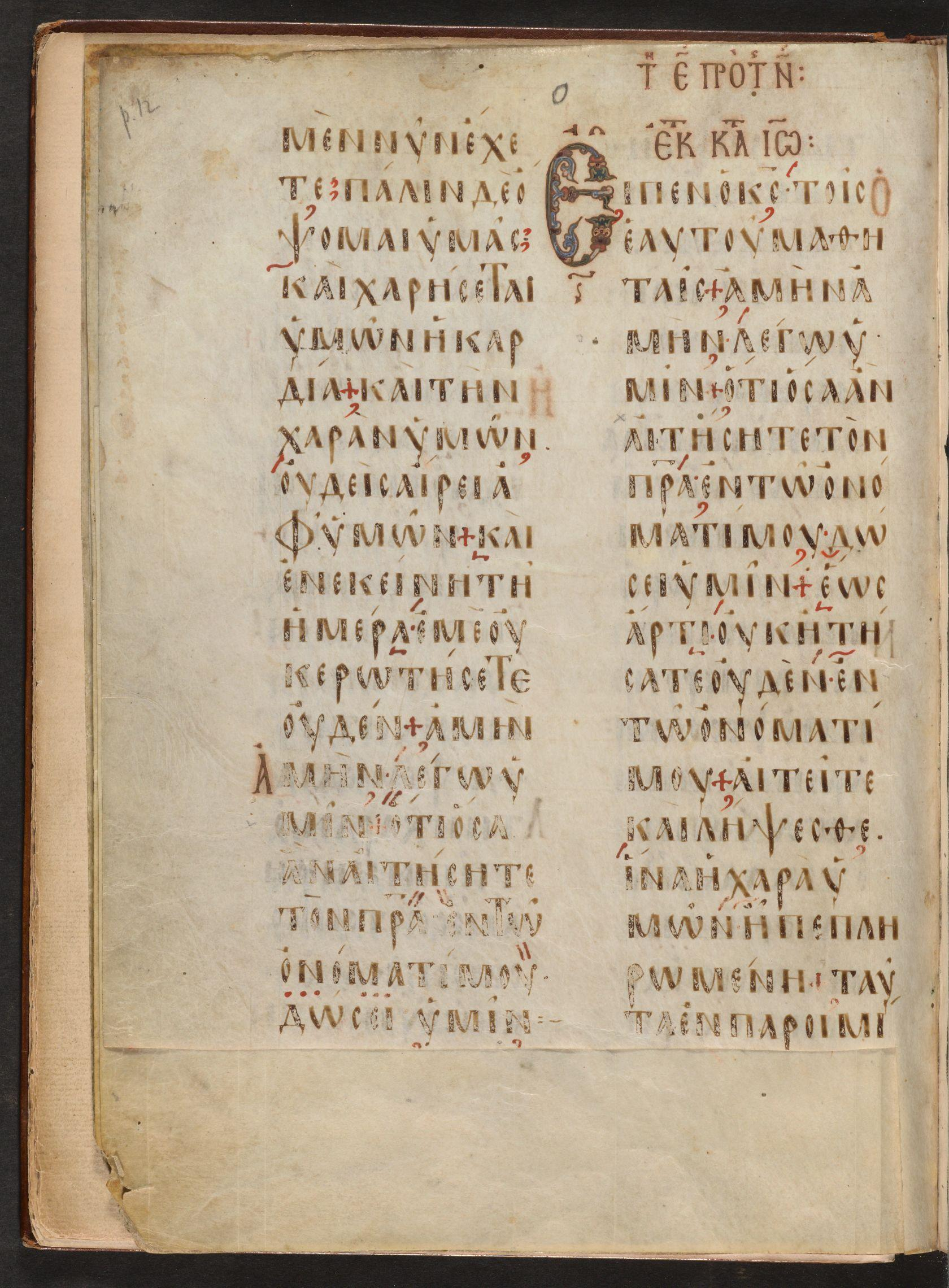
- Text: Evangelistarium †
- Date: 10th century
- Script: Greek
- Now at: Houghton Library
- Size: 31 cm by 22 cm
- Type: Byzantine text-type

Lectionary 296 (Gregory-Aland), designated by siglum ℓ 296 (in the Gregory-Aland numbering) is a Greek manuscript of the New Testament, on parchment. Palaeographically it has been assigned to the 10th century. The manuscript is very lacunose.

== Description ==
The original codex contained lessons from the Gospel of John, Matthew, and Luke (Evangelistarium). Only 6 parchment leaves of the codex have survived. Actually the codex contains lessons with texts of Matthew 4:25—5:13.36—45; John 14:27—15:3; 16:18—33; 17:1—13.18. The leaves are measured (31 cm by 22 cm).

The text is written in Greek uncial letters, in two columns per page, 20 lines per page. The manuscript contains weekday Gospel lessons. It contains music notes. The initial letters are decorated.

The style of handwriting of this codex bears a striking general resemblance to that of three Gospel manuscripts of the 10th and 11th centuries: Codex Cyprius, Lectionary 3, and ℓ 1599.

== History ==
Gregory dated the manuscript to the 9th or 10th century. It is presently assigned by the INTF to the 10th century.

Edward Everett, an American educator (who later became famous as a politician, diplomat, and orator), bought the manuscript in 1819 during his first visit in Greece, along with six other manuscripts (Lectionary 172, Lectionary 297, Lectionary 298).

The manuscript was added to the list of New Testament manuscripts by Caspar René Gregory (number 296^{e}). Scrivener classified this manuscript as 483^{e}. The manuscript was examined by Edward A. Guy, who designated it by siglum I^{h}). Gregory saw the manuscript in 1878.

The text of the manuscript was fully collated by Herman C. Hoskier. The manuscript was examined by Clark and William Hatch, who gave facsimile of one page of the codex.

The manuscript is not cited in the critical editions of the Greek New Testament (UBS3).

Currently the codex is housed at the Houghton Library (MS Gr 6) in the Harvard University.

== See also ==
- List of New Testament lectionaries
- Biblical manuscript
- Textual criticism
- Lectionary 295

== Bibliography ==
- E. Everett, An account of some Greek Manuscripts, procured at Constantinople in 1819 and now belonging to the Library of the University at Cambridge, Memoirs of the American Academy of Arts and Sciences, vol. 4 (1820), pp. 413-414.
- Gregory, Caspar René (1900). Textkritik des Neuen Testaments, Vol. 1. Leipzig: J.C. Hinrichs’sche Buchhandlung. p. 412.
- K. Clark, Descriptive catalogue of Greek New Testament manuscripts in America (1937), pp. 107-109.
