= Lectionary 80 =

Lectionary ℓ 80
- New Testament manuscript
- Text: Evangelistarion
- Date: 12th-century
- Script: Greek
- Now at: Bibliothèque nationale de France
- Size: 26.8 cm by 21 cm

Lectionary 80, designated by siglum ℓ 80 (in the Gregory-Aland numbering), is a Greek manuscript of the New Testament, on vellum leaves. Palaeographically it has been assigned to the 12th-century.

== Description ==
The codex contains lessons from the Gospels of John, Matthew, Luke lectionary (Evangelistarium). It is written in Greek minuscule letters, on 128 parchment leaves (26.8 cm by 21 cm26.8 cm by 21 cm), in 2 columns per page, 21-24 lines per page. The capital letters written in colour and beautifully ornamented.

In Luke 15:21 it has additional reading ποιησον με ως ενα των μισθιων σου; the reading is supported by Sinaiticus, Vaticanus, Bezae, Monacensis, 33, 700, 1195, 1216, 1230, 1241, 1253, 1344, ℓ 13, ℓ 15, ℓ 60, ℓ 185.

== History ==
The manuscript was partially examined by Scholz and Paulin Martin. C. R. Gregory saw it in 1885.

The manuscript is cited in the critical editions of the Greek New Testament (UBS3).

Currently the codex is located in the Bibliothèque nationale de France (Gr. 300) in Paris.

== See also ==
- List of New Testament lectionaries
- Biblical manuscript
- Textual criticism
