= Lectionary 1599 =

Lectionary ℓ 1599
- New Testament manuscript
- Name: Argos Lectionary
- Text: Evangelistarium †
- Date: 10th/11th century
- Script: Greek
- Now at: University of Chicago Library
- Size: 28.8 cm by 22 cm
- Type: Byzantine text-type

Lectionary 1599 (Gregory-Aland), designated by siglum ℓ 1599 (in the Gregory-Aland numbering) is a Greek manuscript of the New Testament, on parchment. Palaeographically it has been assigned to the 10th or 11th century. The manuscript is lacunose. It is known as Argos Lectionary.

== Description ==
The original codex contained lessons from the Gospel of John, Matthew, and Luke (Evangelistarium), with some lacunae. 145 parchment leaves of the codex have survived. The leaves are measured (28.8 cm by 22 cm).

The text is written in Greek uncial letters, in two columns per page, 17 lines per page (and more). The manuscript contains weekday Gospel lessons for Church reading from Easter to Pentecost and Saturday/Sunday Gospel lessons for the other weeks. It contains music notes. The initial letters are decorated.

The style of handwriting of this codex bears a striking general resemblance to that of three Gospel manuscripts of the 10th and 11th centuries: Codex Cyprius, Lectionary 3, and ℓ 296.

== History ==
The manuscript has been assigned by the Institute for New Testament Textual Research to the 10th or 11th century. It is also dated by Special Collections Research Center of the University of Chicago to the 9th or 10th century.

It was bought in Argos in 1930-1931 by Edgar J. Goodspeed (1871-1962), who acquired it from the manager of a Chicago restaurant. It was described in the media as "the Gangster Bible"; it was also named Argos Lectionary, from the place of its origin.

The manuscript was examined by Clark and William Hatch, and Ernest Cadman Colwell. Hatch gave facsimile of one page of the codex. Colwell collated its text.

The codex is housed at the University of Chicago Library (Ms. 128) in Chicago.

== See also ==
- List of New Testament lectionaries
- Biblical manuscript
- Textual criticism

== Bibliography ==
- William Hatch, The Principal Uncial Manuscripts of the New Testament (Chicago, 1937), LXVII
- K. Clark, Descriptive catalogue of Greek New Testament manuscripts in America (1937), pp. 107–109.
- E. C. Colwell, Prolegomena to the Study of the Lectionary Text of the Gospels, The University of Chicago Press, 1933, pp. 81, 84-156.
- New Testament Manuscript Traditions: An Exhibition Based on the Edgar J. Goodspeed Collection of the University of Chicago Library (University of Chicago Library, 1973)
