= Lectionary 172 =

Lectionary ℓ 172
- New Testament manuscript
- Text: Apostolarion
- Date: 13th century
- Script: Greek
- Found: 1819 Edward Everett
- Now at: Harvard University
- Size: 29.5 by 23 cm

Lectionary 172, designated by siglum ℓ 172 (in the Gregory-Aland numbering) is a Greek manuscript of the New Testament, on parchment leaves. Paleographically it has been assigned to the 13th century. Formerly it was labelled by 75^{a}.

== Description ==
The codex contains Lessons from the Acts and Epistles lectionary (Apostolarion). It is written in Greek minuscule letters, on 281 parchment leaves (29.5 cm by 23 cm), in two columns per page, 23 lines per page. It is ornamented, folio 202 mutilated. It contains Menologion. Possibly it was written by the same hand as ℓ 484, but more beautiful.

== History ==
The manuscript was bought in 1819 by Edward Everett from Constantinople to America, along with six other manuscripts (Lectionary 296, Lectionary 297, Lectionary 298). It was examined by Edward A. Guy and Gregory. It was fully collated by Herman C. Hoskier.

The manuscript is not cited in the critical editions of the Greek New Testament (UBS3).

Currently the codex is located in the Harvard University (Ms. Gr. 7 (2)) at Cambridge, Massachusetts.

== See also ==
- List of New Testament lectionaries
- Biblical manuscript
- Textual criticism

== Bibliography ==
- K. W. Clark, A Descriptive Catalogue of Greek New Testament Manuscripts i America (Chicago, 1937), pp. 112–113.
- Herman C. Hoskier, A Full Account and Collation of the Greek Cursive Codex Evangelium 604, (London, 1896).
