= Lectionary 185 =

Lectionary ℓ 185
- New Testament manuscript
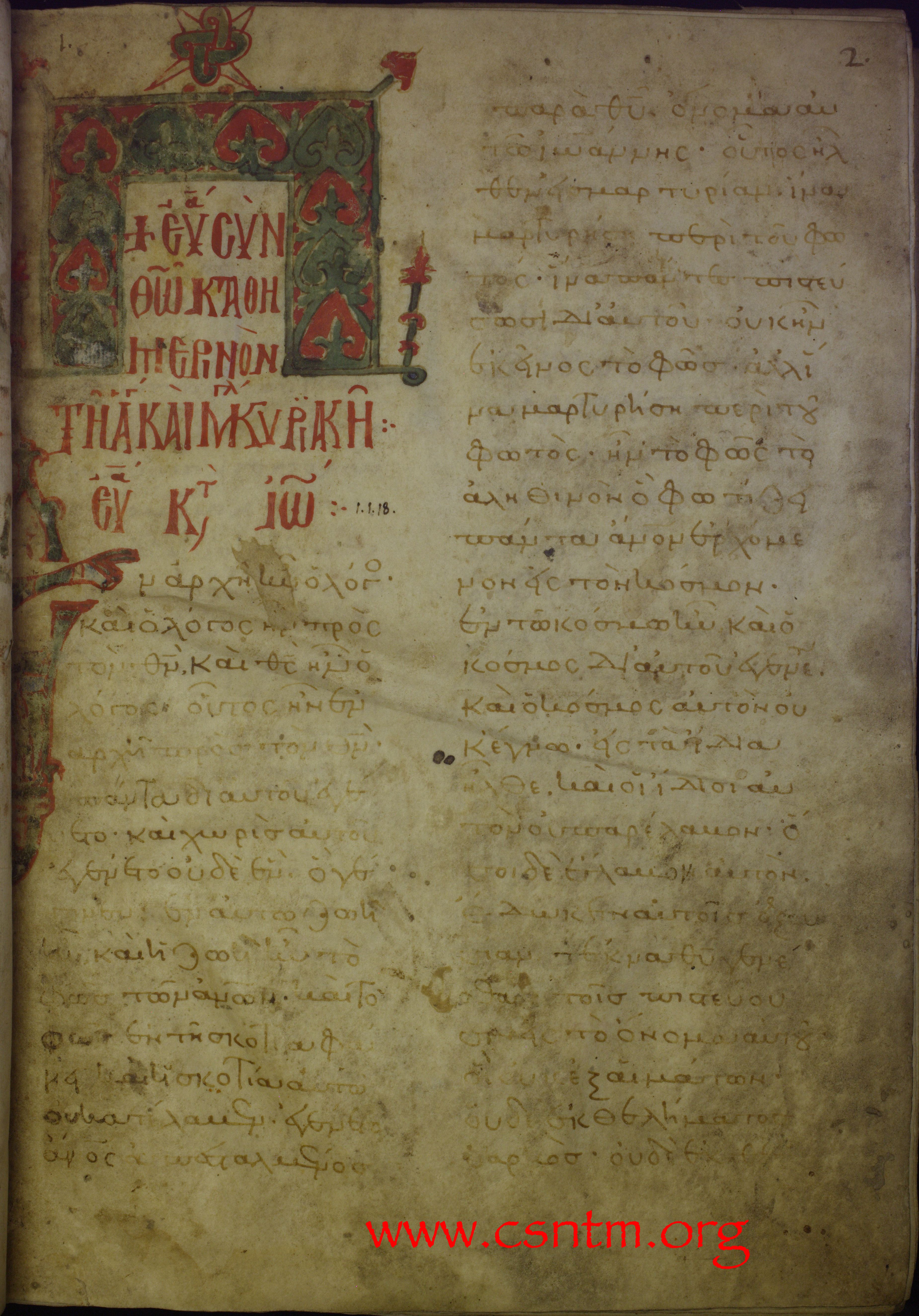
- Text: Evangelistarion
- Date: 11th century
- Script: Greek
- Now at: Christ's College, Cambridge
- Size: 30 by 22.5 cm

Lectionary 185, designated by siglum ℓ 185 (in the Gregory-Aland numbering) is a Greek manuscript of the New Testament, on parchment leaves. Paleographically it has been assigned to the 11th century. Scrivener labelled it by 222^{e}.

== Description ==
The codex contains Lessons from the Gospels of John, Matthew, Luke lectionary (Evangelistarium) with lacunae at the end. It contains also four lessons from the Prophets and four lessons from Epistles. It is written in Greek minuscule letters, on 218 parchment leaves (30 cm by 22.5 cm), in two columns per page, 28-32 lines per page. It contains the Pericope Adulterae (John 8:3-11). It has Synaxarion. It is ornamented. It is much fuller than most lectionaries, and contains many minute variations.

== Text ==
The codex with two other Evangelistaria (Lectionary 6 and Lectionary 13), codex 59 (by the first hand), supports Codex Sinaiticus and Eusebius in the significant omission of υιου βαραχιου (son of Barachi'ah) in Matthew 23:35.

According to Gregory its text is "nicht schlecht" (not bad).

In Matthew 10:3 it reads Θαδδαιος along with Sinaiticus, Vaticanus, 892, vg, cop.

In Matthew 12:30 it reads διαρπαστω for σκορπιζει.

In Luke 15:21 it has additional reading ποιησον με ως ενα των μισθιων σου; the reading is supported by Sinaiticus, Vaticanus, Bezae, Monacensis, 33, 700, 1195, 1216, 1230, 1241, 1253, 1344, ℓ 13, ℓ 15, ℓ 60, ℓ 80.

In John 8:9 it has singular reading της ιδιας συνειδησεως for usual reading οι δε ακουσαντης εξηρχοντο εις καθ' εις;

In John 8:10 it reads, at the margin, Ιησους ειδεν αυτην και along with Codex Nanianus, Codex Tischendorfianus III, f^{13}, 225, 700, 1077, 1443, Ethiopic mss. Majority of the manuscripts read: Ιησους και μηδενα θεασαμενος πλην της γυναικος or: Ιησους.

== History ==
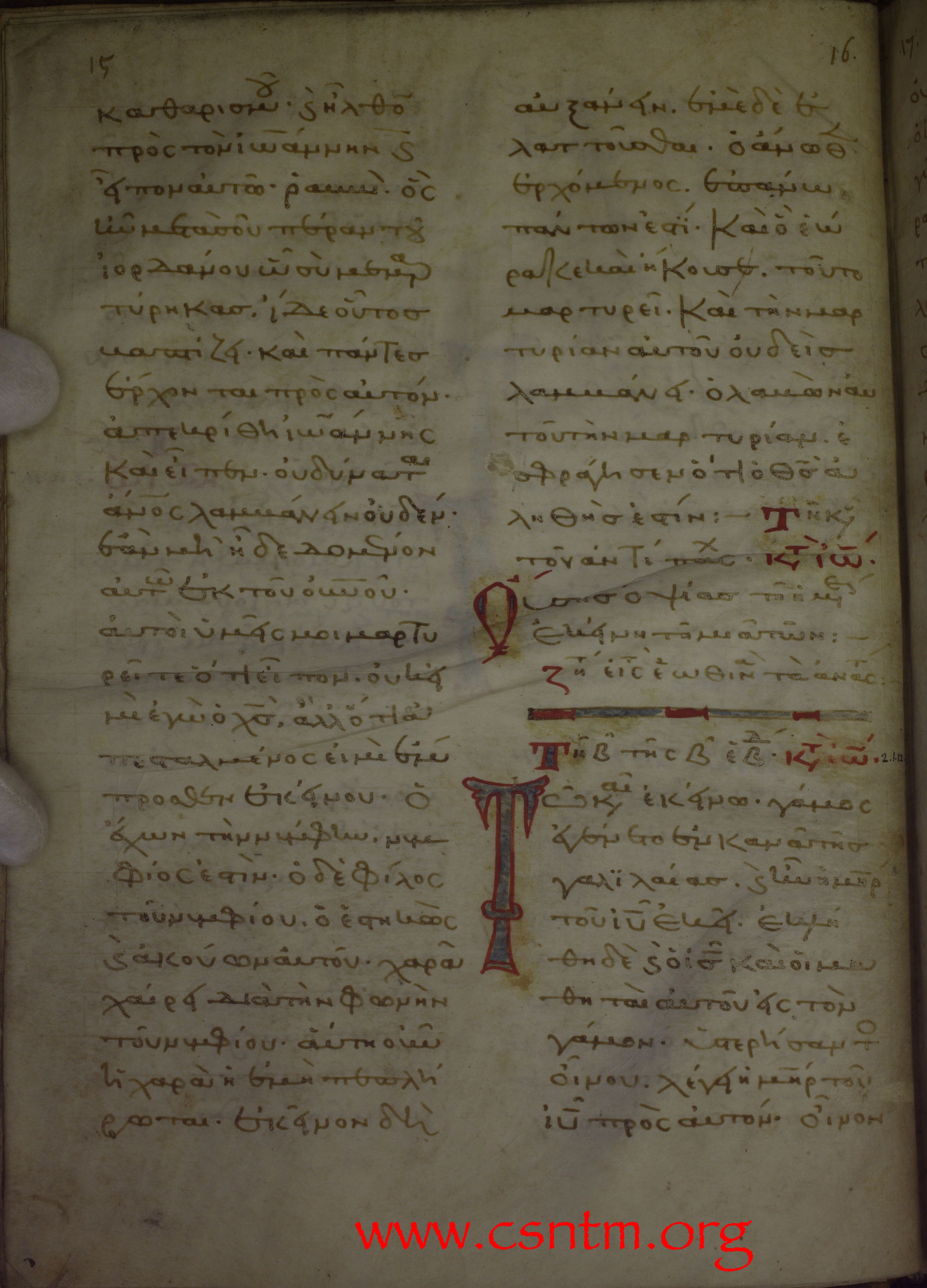

The manuscript is dated by the INTF to the 11th century.

The manuscript exhibits a subscription dated to 1261 (much later than codex). Another note states that the manuscript once belonged to one Athanasius, alumnus from College. Francis Tayler, preacher in Christ Church in Canterbury, presented it in 1654 to the library.

It was examined by Scrivener and Gregory. Scrivener gave its collation in 1859. It is often cited in the critical editions of the Greek New Testament (UBS3).

Currently the codex is located in the Christ's College (GG. 1.6) at Cambridge.

== See also ==
- List of New Testament lectionaries
- Biblical manuscript
- Textual criticism

== Bibliography ==
- F. H. A. Scrivener, An Exact Transcript of the Codex Augiensis (Cambridge and London, 1859), pp. 52–55.
