= Lectionary 297 =

Lectionary ℓ 297
- New Testament manuscript
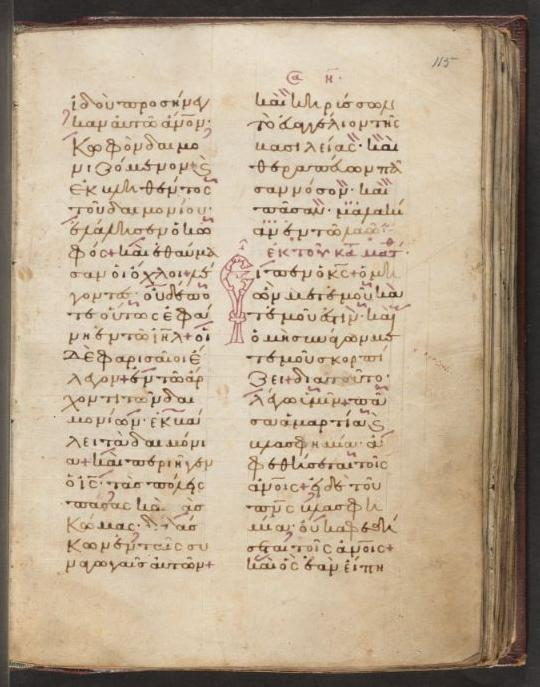
- Text: Evangelistarium †
- Date: 13th century
- Script: Greek
- Now at: Houghton Library
- Size: 27 cm by 20 cm
- Type: Byzantine text-type

Lectionary 297 (Gregory-Aland), designated by siglum ℓ 297 (in the Gregory-Aland numbering) is a Greek manuscript of the New Testament, on parchment. Palaeographically it has been assigned to the 13th century. The manuscript is lacunose.

== Description ==
The original codex contained lessons from the Gospel of John, Matthew, and Luke (Evangelistarium), on 230 parchment leaves, with some lacunae. The leaves are measured (27 cm by 20 cm). It contains Menologion on folios 171-320, accompanied by Apostolarion (lessons from Book of Acts and Epistles).

The text is written in Greek minuscule letters, in two columns per page, 23 lines per page. It contains breathings and accents. The ink is brown. There are a few headpieces and decorated initial letters.

The manuscript contains weekday Gospel lessons for Church reading from Easter to Pentecost and Saturday/Sunday Gospel lessons for the other weeks.

== History ==
Gregory dated the manuscript to the 12th century. It is presently assigned by the INTF to the 13th century.

Edward Everett, an American educator (who later gained fame as a politician, diplomat, and orator), bought the manuscript in 1819, during his first visit in Greece, along with six other Greek manuscripts. Everett used every opportunity of searching for Greek manuscripts. He brought the manuscript to America.

The manuscript was added to the list of New Testament manuscripts by Caspar René Gregory (number 297^{e}). Scrivener catalogued this manuscript as 484^{e} on his list. The manuscript was examined by Edward A. Guy, who designated it by siglum 2^{h} (Lectionary 296 received siglum 1^{h}, Lectionary 298 – 3^{h}). Gregory saw the manuscript in 1878. It was examined and described by Herman C. Hoskier.

The manuscript is not cited in the critical editions of the Greek New Testament (UBS3).

Currently the codex is housed at the Houghton Library (fMS Gr 7 vol.1) in the Harvard University.

== See also ==
- List of New Testament lectionaries
- Biblical manuscript
- Textual criticism
- Lectionary 172

== Bibliography ==
- Josiah Quincy, The History of Harvard University, II. Cambridge: J. Owen, 1840, p. 588.
- Gregory, Caspar René (1900). Textkritik des Neuen Testaments, Vol. 1. Leipzig: J.C. Hinrichs’sche Buchhandlung. p. 412.
- K. Clark, Descriptive catalogue of Greek New Testament manuscripts in America (1937), pp. 110-112.
