= Lectionary 17 =

Lectionary ℓ 17
- New Testament manuscript
- Text: Evangelistarion
- Date: 9th-century
- Script: Greek
- Now at: Bibliothèque nationale de France
- Size: 26 cm by 18.6 cm

Lectionary 17, designated by siglum ℓ 17 (in the Gregory-Aland numbering). It is a Greek manuscript of the New Testament, on vellum leaves. Palaeographically it has been assigned to the 9th-century.

== Description ==
The codex contains Lessons from the Gospels of John, Matthew, Luke lectionary (Evangelistarium), with some lacunae. The text is written in Greek Uncial letters, on 192 parchment leaves (26 cm by 18.6 cm), arranged in 19 quires, 2 columns per page, 23 lines per page, 8-12 letters per line.

== History ==
It was examined by Scholz. Constantin von Tischendorf seems to have confused Lectionary 13 and 17 in his Novum Testamentum, Prolegomena (7th edition, p. CCXVI).

F. H. A. Scrivener dated the manuscript to the 12th-century, C. R. Gregory to the 9th century.

It was added to the list of the New Testament manuscripts by Johann Jakob Wettstein. It was examined and described by Scholz and Paulin Martin. Gregory saw it in 1884.

The manuscript is sporadically cited in the critical editions of the Greek New Testament (UBS3).

Currently the codex is located in the Bibliothèque nationale de France (Gr. 279) in Paris.

== See also ==
- List of New Testament lectionaries
- Biblical manuscript
- Textual criticism

== Bibliography ==
- Gregory, Caspar René (1900). Textkritik des Neuen Testaments. Vol. 1. Leipzig: J. C. Hinrichs. p. 388.
