= Lectionary 6 =

Lectionary ℓ 6
- New Testament manuscript
- Text: Evangelistarion †, Apostolos
- Date: 1265
- Script: Greek-Arabic
- Now at: Leiden University Library
- Size: 19 cm by 13.5 cm

Lectionary 6, designated by siglum ℓ 6 (in the Gregory-Aland numbering). It is a Greek-Arabic diglot manuscript of the New Testament, on paper leaves, dated by a colophon to the year 1265.

== Description ==
The codex contains Lessons from the Acts, Epistles lectionary (Apostolos), Psalms, but a few Lessons from the Gospels (Evangelistarium). It is written in Greek uncial letters, on 275 paper leaves (19 cm by 13.5 cm), 2 columns per page, 18 lines per page.

In Matthew 23:35 phrase υιου βαραχιου (son of Barachi'ah) is omitted; this omission is supported only by Codex Sinaiticus, codex 59 (by the first hand), two other Evangelistaria (ℓ 13, and ℓ 185), and citations in Eusebius.

== History ==
It was examined by Wettstein and Dermount. It was added to the list of the New Testament manuscripts by Wettstein.

The manuscript is sporadically cited in the critical editions of the Greek New Testament of UBS (UBS3).

The codex now is located in the Leiden University Library (Or. 243) at Leiden.

== See also ==
- List of New Testament lectionaries
- Biblical manuscript
- Textual criticism

== Bibliography ==
- Jacobus Dermout, Collectanea Critica in Novum Testamentum, Leiden 1825.
- W. J. de Jonge, Joseph Scaliger's Greek – Arabic Lectionary, Quaerendo 5 (Amsterdam, 1975), pp. 143–172.
- Anton Baumstark, Das Leydener griechisch-arabische Perikopenbuch für die Kar- und Osterwoche, Oriens Christ II, 4 (1915), pp. 38–58.
