= Minuscule 68 =

Greek minuscule manuscript of the New Testament

- New Testament manuscript
- Text: Gospels
- Date: 11th century
- Script: Greek
- Found: Sir George Wheler, 1676
- Now at: Lincoln College, Oxford
- Size: 21 cm by 14.5 cm
- Type: Byzantine text-type
- Category: V
- Note: marginalia

Minuscule 68 (in the Gregory-Aland numbering), ε 269 (von Soden), is a Greek minuscule manuscript of the New Testament, on parchment leaves. Palaeographically it has been assigned to the 11th century. The manuscript has complex contents. It was adapted for liturgical use, it has marginalia.

== Description ==
The codex contains complete text of the four Gospels on 291 leaves (size 21 cm by 14.5 cm). The text is written in one column per page, 23 lines per page.

The text is divided according to the κεφαλαια (chapters), whose numbers are given at the margin of the text, and their τιτλοι (titles of chapters) at the top of the pages. There is also another division according to the smaller Ammonian Sections (no references to the Eusebian Canons).

It contains the Epistle to Carpian, Eusebian Canon tables at the beginning, tables of the κεφαλαια (tables of contents) before each Gospel, lectionary markings at the margin (for liturgical use), synaxaria, and Menologium. It has musical notes in red.

== Text ==
The Greek text of the codex is a representative of the Byzantine text-type. Aland placed it in Category V.

According to the Claremont Profile Method it represents textual family Πb in Luke 1 and Luke 20. In Luke 10 no profile was made.

== History ==
The manuscript was brought to England from Zante by Sir George Wheler, botanist and early traveller, in 1676 with two other copies (95 and ℓ 3). It was used by John Mill in his Novum Testamentum graecum (as Wheeler 1). C. R. Gregory saw it in 1883.

It is currently housed in Lincoln College Library (Gr. 17), Oxford.

== See also ==
- List of New Testament minuscules
- Biblical manuscript
- Textual criticism
