= Minuscule 59 =

- New Testament manuscript
- Text: Gospels
- Date: 13th century
- Script: Greek
- Now at: Gonville and Caius College
- Size: 19.6 cm by 14.5 cm
- Category: none
- Hand: carelessly written
- Note: marginalia

Minuscule 59 (in the Gregory-Aland numbering), ε 272 (Von Soden), is a Greek minuscule manuscript of the New Testament, on parchment leaves. Palaeographically it has been assigned to the 13th century. It has complex contents and some marginalia.

== Description ==
The codex contains complete text of the four Gospels on 238 leaves (size 19.6 cm by 14.5 cm) with lacunae. The text is written in one column per page, 23 lines per page.

The text is divided according to the κεφαλαια (chapters), whose numbers are given at the margin, and their τιτλοι (titles) at the top of the pages. There is also a division according to the Ammonian Sections, but no references to the Eusebian Canons.

It was carelessly written, and exhibits no less than 81 omissions by "homoioteleuton".

== Text ==
The Greek text of the codex is a representative of the Byzantine text-type. Hermann von Soden classified it to the textual family K^{x}. Aland did not place it in any Category. According to the Claremont Profile Method it represents K^{x} text in Luke 10 and Luke 20. In Luke 1 it has mixed Byzantine text.

It has some unusual textual variants. In Matthew 23:35 phrase υιου βαραχιου (son of Barachi'ah) is omitted; this omission is supported only by Codex Sinaiticus, three Evangelistaria (ℓ 6, ℓ 13, and ℓ 185), and Eusebius.

== History ==
The manuscript once belonged to the House of Friars Minor at Oxford. In 1567 Thomas Hatcher gave it to Gonville and Caius College, Cambridge (not 1867, as Scrivener wrote). It was examined by Mill, Wettstein (in 1716), minutely collated by Scrivener in 1860. C. R. Gregory saw it in 1886.

It is currently housed in at the Gonville and Caius College (Ms 403/412), at Cambridge.

== See also ==
- List of New Testament minuscules
- Biblical manuscript
- Textual criticism
