= Lectionary 158 =

Lectionary ℓ 158
- New Testament manuscript
- Text: Apostolarion
- Date: 16th century
- Script: Greek
- Now at: Bibliothèque nationale de France
- Size: 21.4 cm by 13.5 cm
- Note: close to ℓ 60

Lectionary 158, designated by siglum ℓ 158 (in the Gregory-Aland numbering) is a Greek manuscript of the New Testament, on paper leaves. Palaeographically it has been assigned to the 16th century.

== Description ==
The codex contains Lessons from the Acts and Epistles lectionary (Apostolarion), on 206 paper leaves (21.4 cm by 13.5 cm). The text is written in Greek minuscule letters, in one column per page, 30-32 lines per page. Its readings are close to the codex ℓ 60.

== History ==
The manuscript once was a part of Colbert's collection. Gregory assigned it by 34^{a}. It was examined by Paulin Martin.

The manuscript is not cited in the critical editions of the Greek New Testament (UBS3).

Currently the codex is located in the Bibliothèque nationale de France (Gr. 383) at Paris.

== See also ==
- List of New Testament lectionaries
- Biblical manuscript
- Textual criticism
