= Jacob Spon =

French archaeologist (1647–1685)

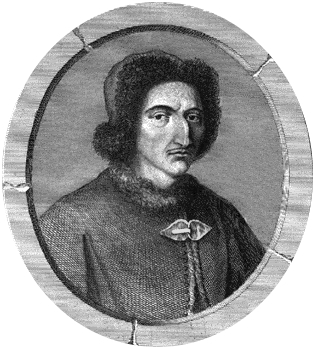
- Jacob Spon
- Born: Jacques Spon; 1647; Lyon, France
- Died: 25 December 1685 (aged 37–38); Vevey, Switzerland
- Occupations: Doctor of Medicine and archaeologist
- Known for: Pioneer in the exploration of the monuments of Greece and a scholar of international reputation in the developing "Republic of Letters"

Jacob Spon (or Jacques; in English dictionaries given as James; 1647 – 25 December 1685) was a French doctor and archaeologist. He was a pioneer in the exploration of the monuments of Greece, and a scholar of international reputation in the developing "Republic of Letters".

== Biography ==
Jacob Spon was born in 1647 in Lyon. His father was Charles Spon, a doctor and Hellenist, of a wealthy and cultured Calvinist banking family from Ulm that had been established since 1551 at Lyon, where they were members of the bourgeois élite. Following medical studies at Strasbourg, the younger Spon first met the son of a friend of his father, Charles Patin, who introduced him to antiquarian interests and the study of numismatics, then as now a window into the world of Classical Antiquity. In Paris, Jacob Spon lodged with Patin's father, Guy Patin. At Montpellier he received his doctorate in medicine (1668) and subsequently practiced in Lyon to a wealthy clientele. There his first publication appeared, a Recherche des antiquités et curiosités de la ville de Lyon and he entered into correspondence with a wider circle of savants: the abbé Claude Nicaise at Dijon, du Cange at Paris, the erudite circles that gravitated to le Grand Dauphin and the duc d'Aumont. Among his correspondents were the courtier-theologian Jacques-Bénigne Bossuet, the philosopher Pierre Bayle, Pierre Carcavy, the Jesuit scholar François d'Aix de la Chaise, confessor to the King, and François Charpentier. He met Jean Mabillon when Mabillon passed through Lyon in 1682.

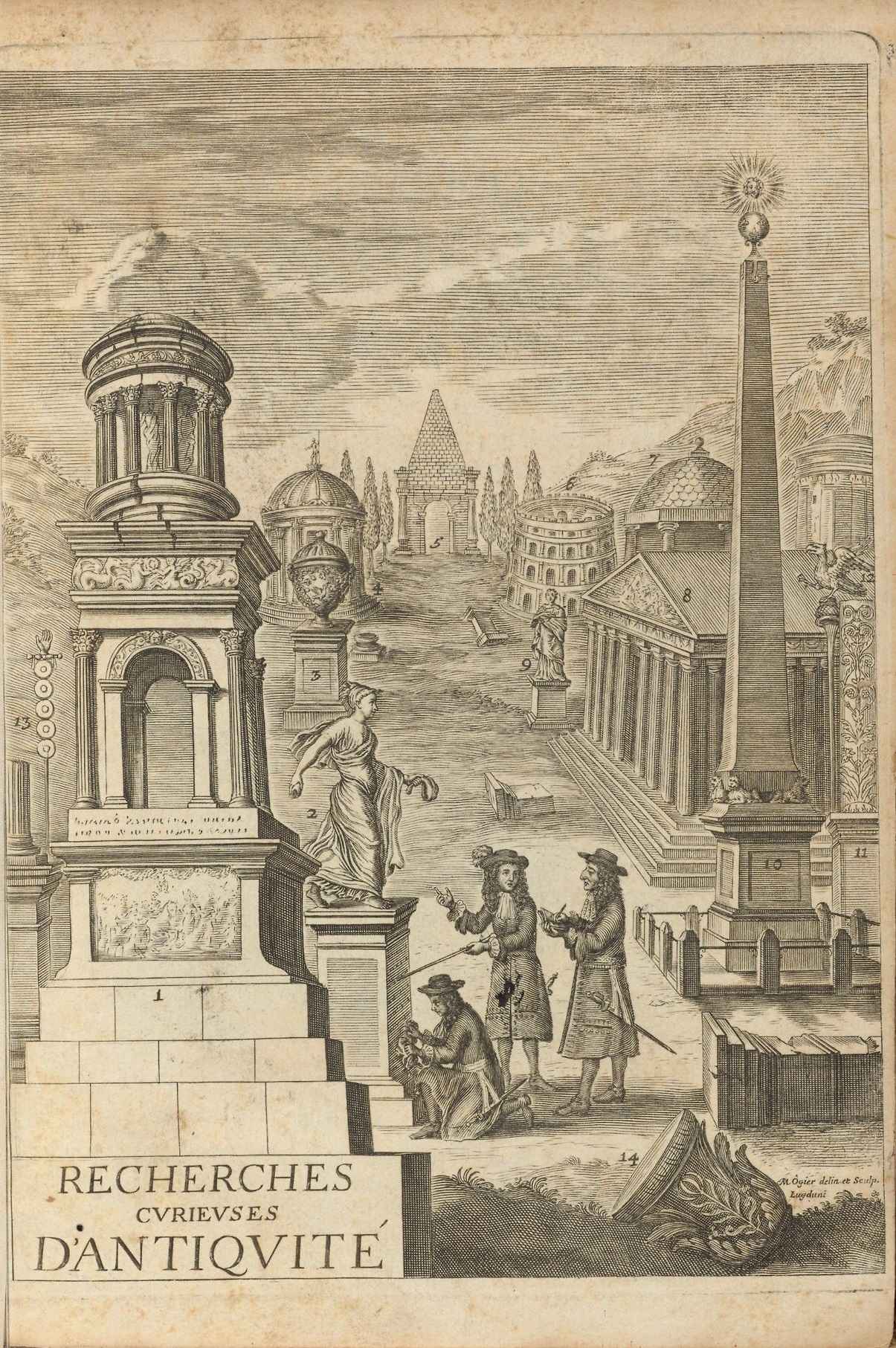
1683 edition of Recherches curieuses d'antiquité

Spon traveled to Italy, and then to Greece, to Constantinople and the Levant in 1675–1676 in the company of the English connoisseur and botanist Sir George Wheler (1650–1723), whose collection of antiquities was afterwards bequeathed to Oxford University. They were among the first knowledgeable Western European antiquaries to see the antiquities of Greece at first hand. Spon's Voyage d'Italie, de Dalmatie, de Grèce et du Levant (1678) remained a useful reference work even in the time of Chateaubriand, who employed it on his trip to the East.

Spon brought back many valuable treasures, coins, inscriptions and manuscripts. In January 1680, he quarrelled with Père de La Chaise, who pressed him to convert to Catholicism. That year Spon published his Histoire de la république de Genève, followed by his Récherches curieuses d'antiquité (Lyon 1683) and in 1685 a collection of transcriptions of Roman inscriptions gleaned over the years, Miscellanea eruditae antiquitatis, in the preface to which he offered one of the earliest definitions of "archaeologia" to describe the study of antiquities in which he was engaged.

In 1681 Spon published a brief (95pp.) treatise on fevers, which, being well-received, he expanded to 264 pp. to include the latest remedies, including "Quinquina" from "Perou," which he considers especially effective, but which, he says, the "Ameriquains" did not recognize: "le quinquina n'etoit pas connu pour la guerison des fievres par les Ameriquains meme...". "Observations sur les Fievres et les Febrifuges" was published by Thomas Amaulry at Lyon in 1684 and posthumously in 1687. Spon points out that he is an expert on fevers because Lyon includes a swampy area (the Dombes) that produces "mauvais air" responsible for fevers—probably actually malaria. As Spon's book illustrates, in the 17th century a whole range of diseases were classified as different "fevers." In its time, "Observations sur les Fievres" was a learned, technical manual for a physician who wanted to be current.

The Revocation of the Edict of Nantes, October 1685, was indirectly the cause of Spon's death. Rather than abjure his Calvinist faith, he preferred to leave for Zürich, an illegal move. His money and baggage were stolen from him, and in fragile health, he died of tuberculosis in the canton hospital at Vevey, Christmas Day 1685, at the age of 38.

== Works ==
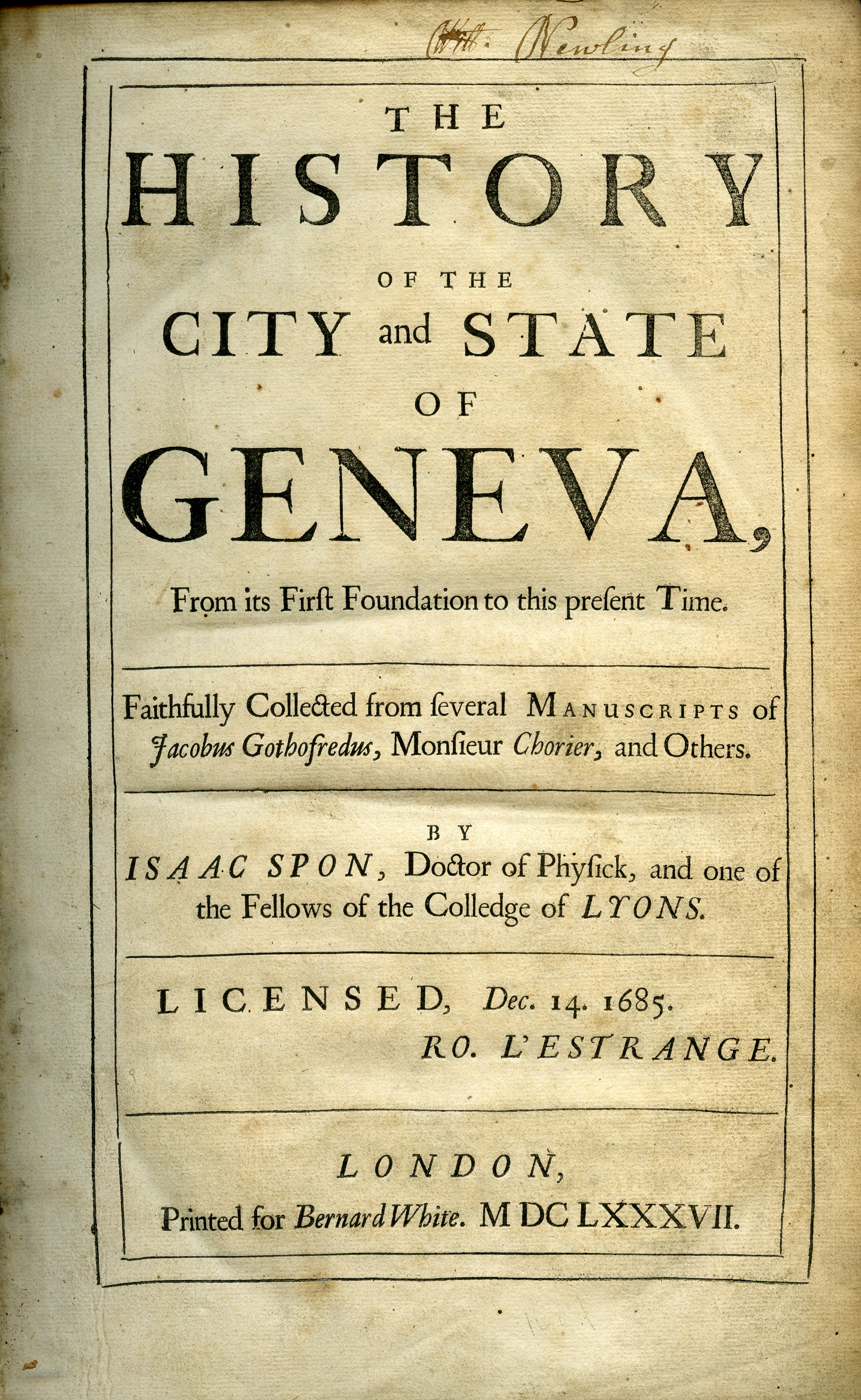

- Histoire de la ville et de l'Estat de Genève, Lyon, 1680, ibid., Amaulry, 1680, 1682, Utrecht : Halma, 1685
- The history of the city and state of Geneva, London : White, 1687
- Historie van de Stad en Staat van Geneve, Amsterdam : Oossaan, 1688
- Histoire de Genève rectifiée et augmentée, Genève : Fabri et Barrillot, 1730
- De l'origine des estrenes, [Lyon], 1673, Paris : Didot et de Bure, 1781
- Recherche des antiquités et curiosités de la ville de Lyon, Lyon, 1673
- Relation de l'état présent de la ville d'Athènes, Lyon, 1674
- Réponse à la critique publiée par M. de Guillet sur le Voyage de Grèce, Lyon, 1679
- Ignotorum atque obscurorum quorundam deorum arae, Lugduni : Faeton, 1676
- Voyage d'Italie, de Dalmatie, de Grèce et du Levant, Lyon : Cellier, 1678, Amsterdam : Boom, 1679
- Viaggi per la Dalmazia, Grecia, e Levante, Bologna : Monti, 1688
- Italiänische, Dalmatische, Griechische und Orientalische Reise-Beschreibung, Nürnberg : Hofmann, 1690, 1713
- Lettres sur l'antiquité de la véritable religion, Lausanne : [Gentil ?], 1681
- Lettres curieuses touchant la religion, Cologne, 1682
- Recherches curieuses d'antiquité, Lyon : Amaulry, 1683
- Miscellanea eruditae antiquitatis, Lugduni : [l'auteur], 1685
- Observations sur les fievres et les febrifuges, Lyon : Amaulry, 1684, 1687
- Novi tractatus de potu caphé, de Chinensium thé et de chocolata, Genavæ : Cramer et Perachon, 1699
