= Lectionary 298 =

Lectionary ℓ 298
- New Testament manuscript
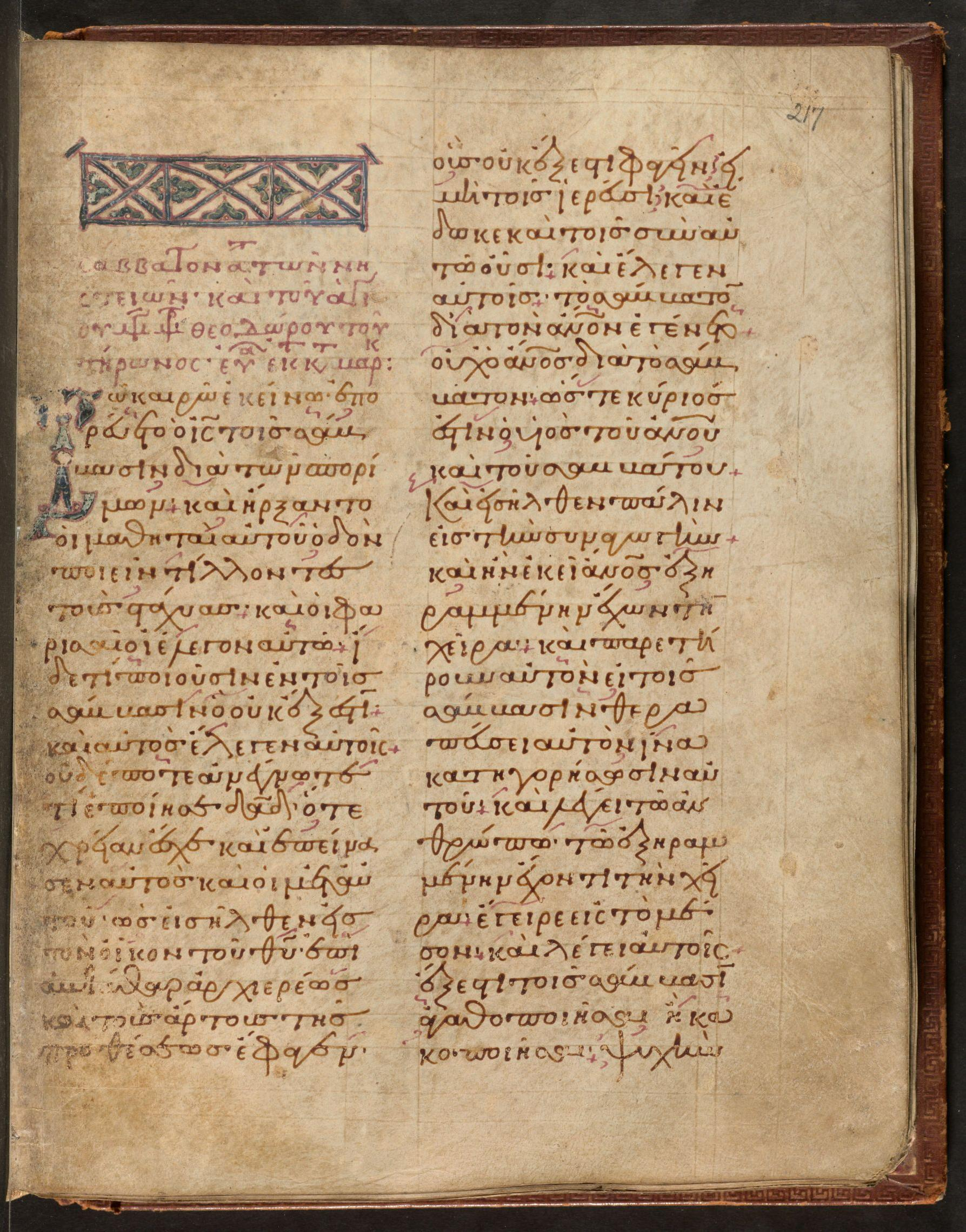
- Text: Evangelistarium
- Date: 14th century
- Script: Greek
- Now at: Houghton Library
- Size: 31 cm by 25 cm
- Type: Byzantine text-type
- Hand: roughly written

Lectionary 298 (Gregory-Aland), designated by siglum ℓ 298 (in the Gregory-Aland numbering) is a Greek manuscript of the New Testament, on parchment. Palaeographically it has been assigned to the 14th century. The manuscript has complex contents.

== Description ==
The original codex contained lessons from the Gospel of John, Matthew, and Luke (Evangelistarium), on 202 parchment leaves. The leaves are measured (31 cm by 25 cm). 12 leaves at the end were supplied by two later hands. The supplied leaves, except one on paper, are palimpsest (1-4, 105–106, 229–232, 399–404). It contains Menologion at the end.

The text is written in Greek minuscule letters, in two columns per page, 25 lines per page. The manuscript contains weekday Gospel lessons. The ink is brown. There are a headpieces, decorated initial letters, and music notes.

According to J. Rendel Harris it is "somewhat roughly written, but containing a better text than 2^{h}".

According to Edward A. Guy it is only one manuscript which in Luke 7:6 agrees with Codex Sinaiticus and Codex Vaticanus in omitting of προς αυτον (to Him). This omission is also supported by Papyrus 75, 892, 1241, and several other manuscripts.

== History ==
C. R. Gregory dated the manuscript to the 13th century. It has been assigned by the Institute for New Testament Textual Research to the 14th century.

Edward Everett, an American educator (who later became famous as a politician, diplomat, and orator), bought the manuscript in 1819 during his first visit in Greece, along with six other Greek manuscripts. Everett used any opportunity of searching for Greek manuscripts.

The manuscript was added to the list of New Testament manuscripts by Caspar René Gregory (number 298^{e}). Scrivener catalogued this manuscript as 485^{e} on his list.

The manuscript was examined by Edward A. Guy, who designated it by siglum 3^{h} (Lectionary 296 received siglum 1^{h}). Herman C. Hoskier and Emilie Boer examined and described the manuscript.

The manuscript is not cited in the critical editions of the Greek New Testament (UBS3).

The codex is housed at the Houghton Library (MS. Gr. 12) in the Harvard University.

== See also ==
- List of New Testament lectionaries
- Biblical manuscript
- Textual criticism
- Lectionary 297

== Bibliography ==
- E. Everett, An account of some Greek Manuscripts, procured at Constantinople in 1819 and now belonging to the Library of the University at Cambridge, Memoirs of the American Academy of Arts and Sciences 4 (1820), pp. 409–415, 411, (no. 2).
- Gregory, Caspar René (1900). Textkritik des Neuen Testaments, Vol. 1. Leipzig: J.C. Hinrichs’sche Buchhandlung. p. 412.
- K. Clark, Descriptive catalogue of Greek New Testament manuscripts in America (1937), pp. 113–115.
