= William Hatch (theologian) =

American theologian (1875–1972)

- Born: William Henry Paine Hatch; August 2, 1875; Camden, New Jersey, U.S.
- Died: November 11, 1972 (aged 97)

Academic background
- Education: Harvard University (AB, PhD); Union Theological Seminary (DDiv); University of Strasbourg (DTh)

Academic work
- Discipline: Theology
- Sub-discipline: Biblical studies

William Henry Paine Hatch (August 2, 1875 – November 11, 1972) was an American theologian and New Testament scholar.

== Early life and education ==
Hatch was born in Camden, New Jersey. He attended Harvard University, graduating in 1898 (Ph.D., 1904). Afterward, he graduated the Episcopal Theological School in Cambridge, Massachusetts, and the General Theological Seminary in New York City. Hatch earned a Doctor of Divinity from Union Theological Seminary in New York and a Doctor of Theology from the University of Strasbourg.

== Career ==
Hatch was ordained to the Episcopal priesthood in 1902. He was Professor of the Literature and Interpretation of the New Testament at the Episcopal Theological School in Cambridge, Massachusetts. Hatch published many articles and reviews and was the author of The Pauline Idea of Faith (1917), and, with C. C. Edmunds, The Gospel Manuscripts of the General Theological Seminary (1918).

== Works ==
=== Thesis ===
- Hatch, William H. P. (1925). The idea of faith in Christian literature from the death of Saint Paul to the close of the second century (D.Théol.). Strasbourg: Imprimerie alsacienne & Univ. de Strasbourg. OCLC 5050877.

=== Books ===
- ———; Edmunds, Charles C. (1918). Gospel Manuscripts of the General Theological Seminary. Harvard Theological Studies. Vol. 4. pp. 7, 50–68.
- ——— (1939). The Principal Uncial Manuscripts of the New Testament. Chicago, IL: University of Chicago Press. OCLC 3971505.
- ——— (1946). An album of dated Syriac manuscripts. Monumenta palaeographica vetera, 2nd ser. Boston, MA: American Academy of Arts and Sciences. OCLC 5050876.
- ——— (1951). Facsimiles and descriptions of minuscule manuscripts of the New Testament. Cambridge: Harvard University Press. OCLC 797558.
