= Codex Monacensis (X 033) =

Uncial 033
- New Testament manuscript
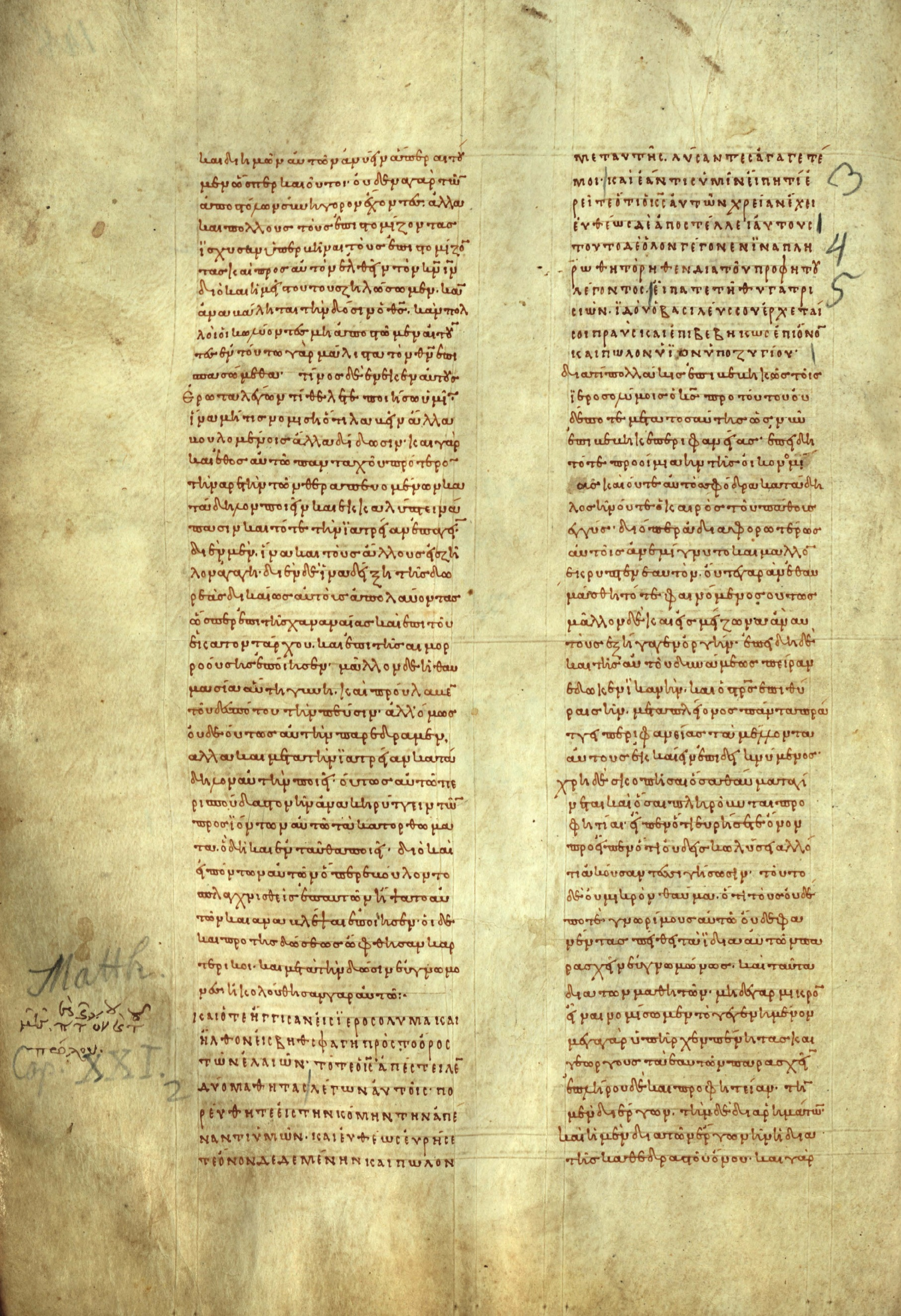
- Folio 148 verso
- Name: Monacensis
- Sign: X
- Text: Gospels
- Date: 9th/10th century
- Script: Greek
- Now at: LMU Munich's University Library
- Size: 37.5 cm by 25.5 cm
- Type: Byzantine text-type
- Category: V

Codex Monacensis is a Greek uncial manuscript of the four Gospels written on parchment. It is designated by the siglum X or 033 in the Gregory-Aland numbering of New Testament manuscripts, and A^{3} in the von Soden numbering of New Testament manuscripts. The manuscript contains commentary from several church fathers. Using the study of comparative writing styles (palaeography), it has been dated to the 9th or 10th century. The manuscript has several gaps, and has been rebound at least once.

The Codex's version of John's Gospel omits the account of Jesus and the woman taken in adultery (John 7:53–8:11): evidence that this story may not have originally formed part of the Gospel of John.

== Description ==
The manuscript is a codex (precursor to the modern book format), containing the text of the four Gospels written on 160 thick parchment leaves (37.5 cm by 25.5 cm) in brown ink. It has survived in a fragmentary condition, with several leaves from the Gospels of Matthew and Mark missing. The text was written in two columns, 45 lines per page, in small, upright uncial letters, by a "very elegant" hand, with breathing marks, accents and some compressed letters. The codex contains the four Gospels in the order of: John, Luke, Mark and Matthew, though the original intended order before it was bound was Matthew, John, Luke and Mark, named the "Western Order". According to Biblical scholar Caspar René Gregory, "der Buchbinder hat alles in Unordnung gebracht" (the bookbinder has messed everything up). Gregory describes the parchment as "thick", and notes that the letters are written under the line ruler markings (to keep the text straight horizontally). Biblical scholar Frederick H. A. Scrivener refers to the codex as a "valuable folio manuscript".

Except for the Gospel of Mark, the remaining three Gospels contain patristic commentaries written in minuscule letters, interspersed between verses as opposed to around the main text. The commentary in Matthew and John is from the writings of John Chrysostom, and for some of Luke it is from Pseudo-Titus of Bostra. Though most of the commentary in Luke is between the verses, on the reverse side of folio 71 and both sides of folio 72, the commentary (from Origen and other early writers) has been written around the text in a later hand to the original.

There are no divisions such as titles (known as τίτλοι / titloi), and the Ammonian sections and Eusebian Canons (both early systems of dividing the Gospels into sections) are absent.

Contents

- Gospel of Matthew 6:6, 10, 11, 7:1-9:20, 9:34-11:24, 12:9-16:28, 17:14-18:25, 19:22-21:13, 21:28-22:22, 23:27-24:2, 24:23-35, 25:1-30, 26:69-27:12,
- Gospel of John 1:1-3:8, 4:6-5:42, 7:1-13:5, 13:20-15:25, 16:23-end,
- Gospel of Luke 1:1-37, 2:19-3:38, 4:21-10:37, 11:1-18:43, 20:46-end,
- Gospel of Mark 6:46-end (some parts of Mark 14-16 are illegible).

== Text ==
The Greek text of this codex is considered a representative of the Byzantine text-type, with occasional readings deemed to be from the Alexandrian text-type. Biblical scholar Samuel Tregelles asserts the text contains many ancient variants. Textual critic Kurt Aland placed it in Category V of his New Testament manuscript classification system. Category V manuscripts are described as "manuscripts with a purely or predominantly Byzantine text."

According to the Claremont Profile Method (a specific analysis of textual data), the codex presents a mixed text, originating from different textual traditions. Only two chapters of the Gospel of Luke (1 and 10) have been examined using this method. Chapter 10 is fragmentary and shows some leanings towards the Alexandrian text-type. Chapter 20 has not been examined because the manuscript has a missing section in this place. The texts of Matthew 16:2b–3 and John 7:53-8:11 are omitted, though the Gospel of Mark has the longer ending.

== History ==
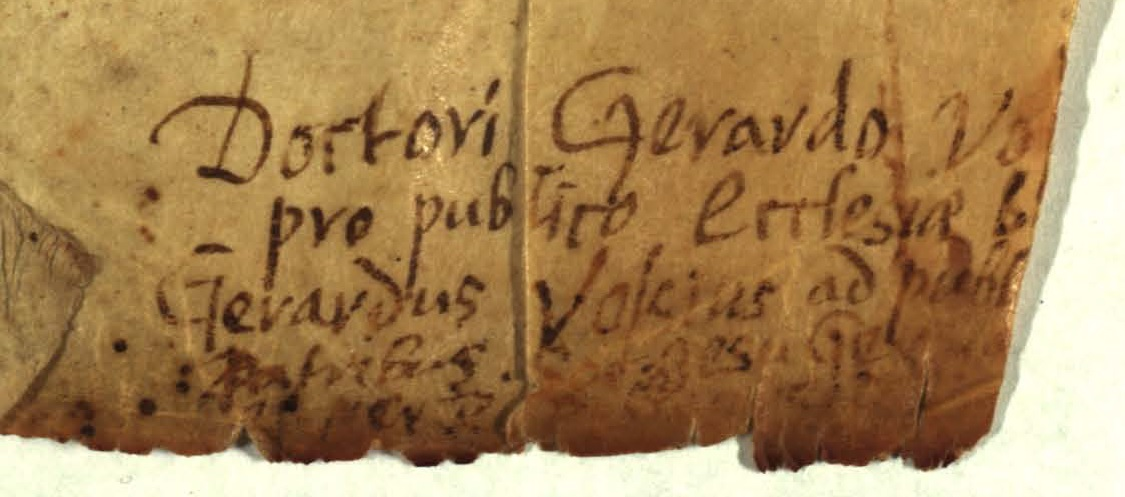
Modern notes on folio 1 recto related to Gerhard Voss

The early history of the codex is unknown, but it has been held in several places such as Innsbruck in 1757. It has been in Rome, in the Jesuit College in Ingolstadt, Germany, and in 1827 it arrived in Munich. Ignatius von Weitenauer, a German Jesuit from Innsbruck, noted in 1757 that the manuscript had once belonged to Gerhard Voss (1577–1649), a Dutch professor who had donated it to the library in Ingolstadt. The first page bears two notes related to Voss: "Doctori Gerardo Vossio pro publico ecclesiae bono" (Doctor Gerard Voss for the public good of the Church) and "Gerardus Vossius ad publicandum patribus soc. Jes. Ger. communica[vit?]" (Shared by Gerard Voss to publicise the fathers of the society of German Jesuits). The manuscript is currently located in LMU Munich's University Library (fol. 30) in Munich, Germany.

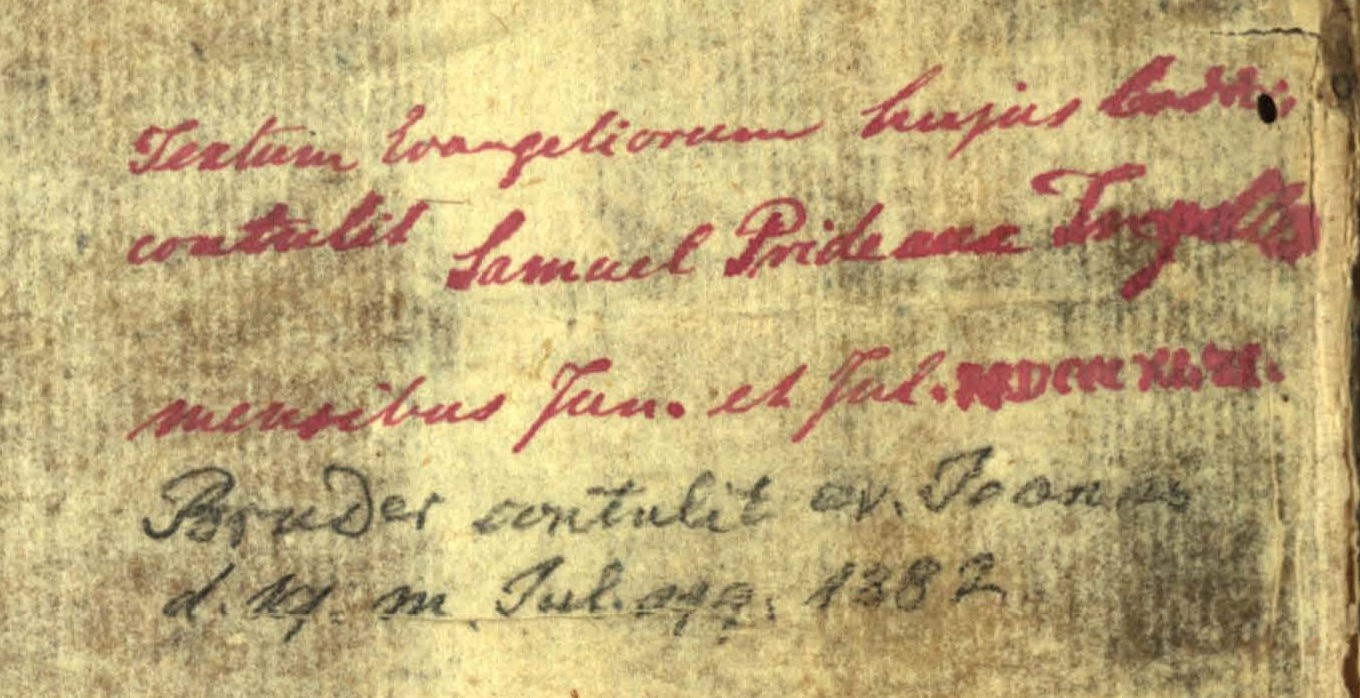
Notes made on paper by Tregelles in 1846 and Bruder in 1882

Whilst in Ingolstadt, it was examined by philologist and historian Josef Dobrovský, who collated some of its readings for textual critic Johann Jakob Griesbach. Biblical scholar Johann M. A. Scholz collated it again, but the collation was considered poor. Biblical scholar Constantin von Tischendorf collated its text again in 1844, and a further collation was done by Tregelles in 1846. Priest and biblical scholar Burgon examined the manuscript in 1872, and the manuscript was further examined by Johannes Bruder in 1882. Burgon also produced a facsimile of the manuscript, but it was considered to be of such poor quality that Scrivener published a new one in 1883. Gregory examined the manuscript twice, first in 1887 then in 1888 where he noted the order of the manuscript leaves.

It has been invariably dated to the 9th or 10th century CE, with the current dating by the INTF to the 10th century.

== See also ==
- Codex Macedoniensis (Y / 034)
- Codex Washingtonianus (W / 032)
- List of New Testament uncials
- Textual criticism
