= Henri Omont =

French librarian, philologist and historian

- Born: 15 September 1857; Évreux, Normandy, France
- Died: 9 December 1940 (aged 83); Paris, France
- Occupations: librarian, philologist, historian

Henri Auguste Omont (French pronunciation: [ɑ̃ʁi oɡyst ɔmɔ̃]; 15 September 1857 – 9 December 1940) was a French librarian, philologist, and historian.

== Life ==
In 1881 he wrote a thesis De la ponctuation and graduated from the École Nationale des Chartes. As a librarian at the Bibliothèque nationale de France, he participated in compiling the "general catalogue of the manuscripts of the public libraries of France" (Alençon, Avranches, Louviers). At the same time, he undertook research on ancient libraries and the history of printing and books. Omont became a member of the Société des Antiquaires de France and of the Académie des Inscriptions et Belles-Lettres in 1900. Between 1900 and 1921, Omont was president of the Société libre d'agriculture, sciences, arts et belles-lettres de l'Eure.

He received the honorary degree Doctor of Letters (D.Litt.) from the University of Oxford in October 1902, in connection with the tercentenary of the Bodleian Library.

After his death, his private library stayed with his widow until it was bought in 1948 by the Catholic University of Leuven, to help reconstruct its collections after they were destroyed by the Germans for the second time. In 1970, Omont's library was divided when the university separated into a Dutch-speaking university that remained in Leuven, and a French-speaking one that moved to a new university town called Louvain-la-Neuve.

== Selected works ==
- Le fonds grec de la Bibliothèque nationale (Paris 1883)
- Notes sur les manuscrits grecs du British Museum, Bibliothèque de l’École des Chartes, 45 (1884), pp. 314–350.
- Notice sur un très ancien manuscrit grec en onciales des Epîtres de Paul, conservé à la Bibliothèque Nationale. (Paris 1889).
- Facsimilés des plus anciens manuscrits grecs de la Bibliothèque nationale du IXe et XIVe siècle, Bibliothèque de l'École des chartes, (Paris 1891).
- Facsimilés des plus anciens manuscrits grecs de la Bibliothèque nationale du IVe et XIIIe siècle, Bibliothèque de l'École des chartes, (Paris 1892).
- Catalogues des livres grecs et latins imprimés par Alde Manuce à Venise (1498–1503–1513), reproduits en phototypie, avec une préface, (Paris: Émile Bouillon, 1892).
- Très anciens manuscrits grecs bibliques et classiques de la Bibliothèque nationale (Paris 1896).
- Catalogus codicum hagiographicorum graecorum Bibliothecae nationalis (Paris 1896).
- Catalogue des manuscrits grecs, latins, français et espagnols: et des portulans (Paris 1897)
- Inventaire sommaire des manuscrits grecs de la Bibliothèque nationale (Paris 1898).
- Notice sur un très ancien manuscrit grec de l'évangile de saint Matthieu... (Notices et extraits des manuscrits de la bibliothèque nationale; vol. 36.) (Paris, 1901).
- Catalogue des manuscrits Ashburnham-Barrois récemment acquis par la Bibliothèque nationale (1901)
- Missions archéologiques françaises en Orient aux XVIIe et XVIIIe siècles (Paris, 1902)
- Notice sur les manuscrits originaux et autographes des Œuvres de Brantôme offerts par Madame la baronne James de Rothschild à la Bibliothèque nationale (Paris, 1904)
- Psautier illustré (XIIIe siècle) : reproduction des 107 miniatures du Manuscrit latin (Paris 1906)
- Un nouveau manuscrit illustré de l'Apocalypse au IXe siècle. Notice du ms. latin nouv. acq. 1132 de la Bibliothèque nationale (1922)
- Nouvelles acquisitions du département des manuscrits de la Bibliothèque nationale pendant les années 1924-1928 (1928)

== Bibliography ==
- Bibliographie des travaux de M. Henri Omont. Paris: H. Didier; Toulouse: Ed. Privat, 1933, XI-270 p. 1108 entries. "Pour le cinquantième anniversaire de l'entrée à la Bibliothèque nationale de m. Henri Omont, la bibliographie de ses travaux a été dressée par les conservateurs-adjoints et les bibliothécaires du Département des manuscrits de la Bibliothèque nationale." Edited by P. Lauer and E. A. van Moé.
- Chris Coppens a.o.(eds), Sapientia aedicavit sibi domum: Leuven University Library 1425–2000, Leuven 2005, p. 351

== Sources ==
- Livret de l'École des Chartes 1821-1966
- Catalogue général de la BnF
- 193 contributions à la Bibliothèque de l'École des chartes.
- 262 ouvrages at the Système universitaire de documentation.
