= Lectionary 327 =

Lectionary ℓ 327
- New Testament manuscript
- Text: Evangelistarium †
- Date: 14th century
- Script: Greek
- Found: 1862
- Now at: British Library
- Size: 36.9 cm by 27.8 cm
- Type: Byzantine text-type

Lectionary 327 (Gregory-Aland), designated by siglum ℓ 327 (in the Gregory-Aland numbering) is a Greek manuscript of the New Testament, on parchment. Palaeographically it has been assigned to the 14th century. The manuscript has not survived in complete condition.

== Description ==
The original codex contained lessons from the Gospel of John, Matthew, and Luke (Evangelistarium), with numerous lacunae, on 178 parchment leaves. The leaves are measured (36.9 cm by 27.8 cm).

The text is written in Greek minuscule letters, in two columns per page, 26-30 lines per page.

The codex contains weekday Gospel lessons.

== History ==
Scrivener and Gregory dated the manuscript to the 14th century. It has been assigned by the Institute for New Testament Textual Research to the 14th-century.

The manuscript was written in Constantinople.

It was purchased from H. Stanhope Freeman in 1862 (along with Lectionary 325, Lectionary 326 and Lectionary 328).

The manuscript was added to the list of New Testament manuscripts by Frederick Henry Ambrose Scrivener (276^{e}) and Caspar René Gregory (number 327^{e}). Gregory saw it in 1883.

The codex is housed at the British Library (Add MS 24379) in London.

The fragment is not cited in critical editions of the Greek New Testament (UBS4, NA28).

== See also ==
- List of New Testament lectionaries
- Biblical manuscript
- Textual criticism

== Bibliography ==
- Gregory, Caspar René (1900). Textkritik des Neuen Testaments. Vol. 1. Leipzig: J.C. Hinrichs’sche Buchhandlung. p. 415.
