= Lectionary 330 =

Lectionary ℓ 330
- New Testament manuscript
- Text: Evangelistarium †
- Date: 12th century
- Script: Greek
- Found: 1871
- Now at: British Library
- Size: 28 cm by 22.3 cm
- Type: Byzantine text-type

Lectionary 330 (Gregory-Aland), designated by siglum ℓ 330 (in the Gregory-Aland numbering) is a Greek manuscript of the New Testament, on parchment. Palaeographically it has been assigned to the 12th century. The manuscript has not survived in complete condition.

== Description ==
The original codex contained lessons from the Gospel of John, Matthew, and Luke (Evangelistarium), with lacunae (40 leaves were lost) on 306 parchment leaves. The leaves are measured (28 cm by 22.3 cm).

The text is written in Greek minuscule letters, in two columns per page, 21 lines per page.

The codex contains weekday Gospel lessons from Easter to Pentecost and Saturday/Sunday Gospel lessons for the other weeks.

== History ==
According to the colophon it was written in 1185. It has been assigned by the Institute for New Testament Textual Research (INTF) to the 12th century.

It was written by a monk named Cosmas for one Basilius.

It was purchased from Ivor B. Guest in 1871 (along with lectionary 331). It was examined and described by Oscar von Gebhardt in 1881.

The manuscript was added to the list of New Testament manuscripts by Frederick Henry Ambrose Scrivener (279^{e}) and Caspar René Gregory (number 330^{e}). Gregory saw it in 1883.

The codex is housed at the British Library (Add MS 28817) in London.

The fragment is not cited in critical editions of the Greek New Testament (UBS4, NA28).

== See also ==
- List of New Testament lectionaries
- Biblical manuscript
- Textual criticism
- Lectionary 329

== Bibliography ==
- Gregory, Caspar René (1900). Textkritik des Neuen Testaments. Vol. 1. Leipzig: J.C. Hinrichs’sche Buchhandlung. p. 416.
