= Lectionary 322 =

Lectionary ℓ 322
- New Testament manuscript
- Text: Evangelistarium †
- Date: 11th-century
- Script: Greek
- Found: 1859
- Now at: British Library
- Size: 29.1 cm by 22 cm
- Type: Byzantine text-type

Lectionary 322 (Gregory-Aland), designated by siglum ℓ 322 (in the Gregory-Aland numbering) is a Greek manuscript of the New Testament, on parchment. Palaeographically it has been assigned to the 11th-century. The manuscript has survived in complete condition.

== Description ==
The original codex contained lessons from the Gospel of John and Matthew (Evangelistarium), on 79 parchment leaves. The leaves are measured (29.1 cm by 22 cm).

The text is written in Greek minuscule letters, in two columns per page, 24 lines per page. It has musical notes.

== History ==
Scrivener dated the manuscript to the 13th-century, Gregory dated it to the 11th-century. It is presently assigned by the INTF to the 11th-century.

It was purchased from Spyridon P. Lambros from Athens, on 26 March 1859 (along with lectionaries 321, 323, and 324).

The manuscript was added to the list of New Testament manuscripts by Scrivener (270^{e}) and Gregory (number 322^{e}). Gregory saw it in 1883.

The manuscript was mentioned by Catalogue of Additions to the Manuscripts in the British Museum, 1854-1875, by M. Richard.

Currently the codex is housed at the British Library (Add MS 22742) in London.

The fragment is not cited in critical editions of the Greek New Testament (UBS4, NA28).

== See also ==
- List of New Testament lectionaries
- Biblical manuscript
- Textual criticism
- Lectionary 320

== Bibliography ==
- Gregory, Caspar René (1900). Textkritik des Neuen Testaments. Vol. 1. Leipzig: J.C. Hinrichs’sche Buchhandlung. p. 415.
