= Lectionary 323 =

Lectionary ℓ 323
- New Testament manuscript
- Text: Evangelistarium †
- Date: 13th century
- Script: Greek
- Found: 1859
- Now at: British Library
- Size: 36.9 cm by 25 cm
- Type: Byzantine text-type

Lectionary 323 (Gregory-Aland), designated by siglum ℓ 323 (in the Gregory-Aland numbering) is a Greek manuscript of the New Testament, on parchment. Palaeographically it has been assigned to the 13th century. The manuscript has survived in complete condition.

== Description ==
The original codex contained lessons from the Gospel of John, Matthew, and Luke (Evangelistarium), on 213 parchment leaves. The leaves are measured (36.9 cm by 25 cm). It contains also the Synaxarion (folios 190-212v), Homilies of John Chrysostom to Genesis (folios 213r-v).

The text is written in Greek minuscule letters, in one column per page, 18 lines per page. The ink is brown.

The codex contains weekday Gospel lessons. 318, 321 and 323 sometimes agree with each other in departing from the ordinary weekday Church lessons.

== History ==
Scrivener dated the manuscript to the 12th century, and Gregory dated it to the 13th century. It has been assigned by the Institute for New Testament Textual Research to the 13th century.

It was purchased from Spyridon P. Lambros from Athens, on 26 March 1859 (along with lectionaries 321, 322, and 324).

The manuscript was added to the list of New Testament manuscripts by Frederick Henry Ambrose Scrivener (271^{e}) and Caspar René Gregory (number 323^{e}). Gregory saw it in 1883.

The manuscript was mentioned in Catalogue of Additions to the Manuscripts in the British Museum, 1854-1875, by M. Richard.

The codex is housed at the British Library (Add MS 22743) in London.

The fragment is not cited in critical editions of the Greek New Testament (UBS4, NA28).

== See also ==
- List of New Testament lectionaries
- Biblical manuscript
- Textual criticism
- Lectionary 320

== Bibliography ==
- Gregory, Caspar René (1900). Textkritik des Neuen Testaments. Vol. 1. Leipzig: J.C. Hinrichs’sche Buchhandlung. p. 415.
