= Lectionary 328 =

Lectionary ℓ 328
- New Testament manuscript
- Text: Evangelistarium †
- Date: 14th century
- Script: Greek
- Found: 1862
- Now at: British Library
- Size: 28.4 cm by 22.2 cm
- Type: Byzantine text-type

Lectionary 328 (Gregory-Aland), designated by siglum ℓ 328 (in the Gregory-Aland numbering) is a Greek manuscript of the New Testament, on parchment. Palaeographically it has been assigned to the 14th century. The manuscript has not survived in complete condition.

== Description ==
The original codex contained lessons from the Gospel of John, Matthew, and Luke (Evangelistarium), with lacunae at the beginning and the end, on 126 parchment leaves. The leaves are measured (28.4 cm by 22.2 cm).

The text is written in Greek minuscule letters, in two columns per page, 21-27 lines per page.

It contains musical notes.

The codex contains weekday Gospel lessons from Easter to Pentecost and Saturday/Sunday Gospel lessons for the other weeks.

== History ==
Scrivener and Gregory dated the manuscript to the 14th-century. It is presently assigned by the INTF to the 14th-century.

It was purchased from H. Stanhope Freeman in 1862 (along with Lectionary 325 and Lectionary 326).

The manuscript was added to the list of New Testament manuscripts by Scrivener (277^{e}) and Gregory (number 328^{e}). Gregory saw it in 1883.

Currently the codex is housed at the British Library (Add MS 24380) in London.

The fragment is not cited in critical editions of the Greek New Testament (UBS4, NA28).

== See also ==
- List of New Testament lectionaries
- Biblical manuscript
- Textual criticism
- Lectionary 327

== Bibliography ==
- Gregory, Caspar René (1900). Textkritik des Neuen Testaments. Vol. 1. Leipzig: J.C. Hinrichs’sche Buchhandlung. p. 415.
