= Lectionary 321 =

Lectionary ℓ 321
- New Testament manuscript
- Text: Evangelistarium †
- Date: 12th century
- Script: Greek
- Found: 1859
- Now at: British Library
- Size: 31.1 cm by 24.1 cm
- Type: Byzantine text-type

Lectionary 321 (Gregory-Aland), designated by siglum ℓ 321 (in the Gregory-Aland numbering) is a Greek manuscript of the New Testament, on parchment. Palaeographically it has been assigned to the 12th century. The manuscript has survived in complete condition.

== Description ==
The original codex contained lessons from the Gospel of John, Matthew, and Luke (Evangelistarium), on 304 parchment leaves. The leaves are measured (31.1 cm by 24.1 cm). It has Synaxarion. Seven leaves at the end contain a patristic matter (of Gregory of Nazianzus).

The text is written in Greek minuscule letters, in two columns per page, 23 lines per page. It has musical notes.

The codex contains weekday Gospel lessons. 318, 321 and 323 sometimes agree with each other in departing form the ordinary weekday Church lessons.

It contains the Pericope Adulterae (with textual variant εις οξομολογοθμενοις).

== History ==
Scrivener dated the manuscript to the 13th century, Gregory dated it to the 12th or 13th century. It is presently assigned by the INTF to the 12th century.

It was purchased from Spyridon P. Lambros from Athens, on 26 March 1859 (along with lectionaries 322, 323, and 324).

The manuscript was added to the list of New Testament manuscripts by Scrivener (269^{e}) and Gregory (number 321^{e}). Gregory saw it in 1883.

The manuscript was mentioned by Catalogue of Additions to the Manuscripts in the British Museum, 1854-1875, by M. Richard, by J. Mossay and X. Lequeux.

Currently the codex is housed at the British Library (Add MS 22735) in London.

The fragment is not cited in critical editions of the Greek New Testament (UBS4, NA28).

== See also ==
- List of New Testament lectionaries
- Biblical manuscript
- Textual criticism
- Lectionary 320

== Bibliography ==
- Gregory, Caspar René (1900). Textkritik des Neuen Testaments. Vol. 1. Leipzig: J.C. Hinrichs’sche Buchhandlung. p. 415.
