= Lectionary 324 =

Lectionary ℓ 324
- New Testament manuscript
- Text: Evangelistarium †
- Date: 13th century
- Script: Greek
- Found: 1859
- Now at: British Library
- Size: 28.4 cm by 21.3 cm
- Type: Byzantine text-type

Lectionary 324 (Gregory-Aland), designated by siglum ℓ 324 (in the Gregory-Aland numbering) is a Greek manuscript of the New Testament, on parchment. Palaeographically it has been assigned to the 13th century. The manuscript has not survived in complete condition.

== Description ==
The original codex contained lessons from the Gospel of John, Matthew, and Luke (Evangelistarium), on 189 parchment leaves. The leaves are measured (28.4 cm by 21.3 cm). It has some lacunae at the beginning, the end and elsewhere. It contains also the Synaxarion (folios 160-189v) and other non-biblical matter.

The text is written in Greek minuscule letters, in two columns per page, 23 lines per page. The ink is brown.

The codex contains weekday Gospel lessons. It has some lessons from the Prophets and Epistles.

== History ==
Scrivener and Gregory dated the manuscript to the 13th century. It is presently assigned by the INTF to the 13th century.

It was purchased from Spyridon P. Lambros from Athens, 26 March 1859 (along with lectionaries 321, 322, and 323).

The manuscript was added to the list of New Testament manuscripts by Scrivener (272^{e}) and Gregory (number 324^{e}). Gregory saw it in 1883.

The manuscript was mentioned by Catalogue of Additions to the Manuscripts in the British Museum, 1854-1875, by M. Richard.

Currently the codex is housed at the British Library (Add MS 22744) in London.

The fragment is not cited in critical editions of the Greek New Testament (UBS4, NA28).

== See also ==
- List of New Testament lectionaries
- Biblical manuscript
- Textual criticism
- Lectionary 320

== Bibliography ==
- Gregory, Caspar René (1900). Textkritik des Neuen Testaments. Vol. 1. Leipzig: J.C. Hinrichs’sche Buchhandlung. p. 415.
