= Lectionary 318 =

Lectionary ℓ 318
- New Testament manuscript
- Text: Evangelistarium †
- Date: 12th century
- Script: Greek
- Found: 1854
- Now at: British Library
- Size: 33.1 cm by 25.8 cm
- Type: Byzantine text-type

Lectionary 318 (Gregory-Aland), designated by siglum ℓ 318 (in the Gregory-Aland numbering) is a Greek manuscript of the New Testament, on parchment. Palaeographically it has been assigned to the 12th century. The manuscript has survived in a fragmentary condition.

== Description ==
The original codex contained lessons from the Gospel of John, Matthew, and Luke (Evangelistarium), on 279 fragment parchment leaves. Some leaves at the end of the codex were lost. The leaves are measured (33.1 cm by 25.8 cm). The last leaf was added by later hand (folio 279).

The text is written in Greek minuscule letters, in two columns per page, 23 lines per page. It has musical notes. It contains decorated headpieces and initial letters.

The codex contains weekday Gospel lessons. Lectionary 318, 321 and 323 sometimes agree with each other in departing form the ordinary weekday Church lessons.

== History ==
Scrivener dated the manuscript to the 13th century, Gregory dated it to the 12th or 13th century. It has been assigned by the Institute for New Testament Textual Research (INTF) to the 12th century.

It was purchased for the British Museum at Sotheby's, on 12 January 1854.

The manuscript was added to the list of New Testament manuscripts by Frederick Henry Ambrose Scrivener (265^{e}) and Caspar René Gregory (number 318^{e}). Gregory saw it in 1883.

The codex is now housed at the British Library (Add MS 19737) in London.

The fragment is not cited in critical editions of the Greek New Testament (UBS4, NA28).

== See also ==
- List of New Testament lectionaries
- Biblical manuscript
- Textual criticism
- Lectionary 317

== Bibliography ==
- Gregory, Caspar René (1900). Textkritik des Neuen Testaments. Vol. 1. Leipzig: J.C. Hinrichs’sche Buchhandlung. p. 414.
