= Lectionary 316 =

Lectionary ℓ 316
- New Testament manuscript
- Text: Evangelistarium †
- Date: 8th century
- Script: Greek
- Now at: British Library
- Size: 25.4 cm by 17.9 cm
- Type: Byzantine text-type

Lectionary 316 (Gregory-Aland), designated by siglum ℓ 316 (in the Gregory-Aland numbering) is a Greek manuscript of the New Testament, on parchment. Palaeographically it has been assigned to the 8th century. The manuscript has survived in a fragmentary condition.

== Description ==
The original codex contained lessons from the Gospel of John, Matthew, and Luke (Evangelistarium), on 23 fragment parchment leaves. Some leaves at the codex were lost. The leaves are measured (25.4 cm by 17.9 cm). It is a palimpsest, the upper text is in Syriac. It is from the 10th century.

The text is written in Greek uncial letters, in two columns per page, 31 lines per page.

The codex contains Gospel lessons in the Byzantine Church order.

== History ==
Scrivener and Gregory dated the manuscript to the 7th century. It is presently assigned by the INTF to the 8th century.

It was brought from the monastery of Maria Deipara in Egypt.

The manuscript was added to the list of New Testament manuscripts by Scrivener (496^{e}) and Gregory (number 317^{e}). Gregory saw it in 1883.

The upper text of palimpsest was described by William Hatch.

Currently the codex is housed at the British Library (Add MS 14637) in London.

The fragment is not cited in critical editions of the Greek New Testament (UBS4, NA28).

== See also ==
- List of New Testament lectionaries
- Biblical manuscript
- Textual criticism
- Lectionary 317

== Bibliography ==
- Gregory, Caspar René (1900). Textkritik des Neuen Testaments. Vol. 1. Leipzig: J.C. Hinrichs’sche Buchhandlung. p. 414.
