= Lectionary 331 =

Greek-language manuscript of the New Testament

Lectionary ℓ 331
- New Testament manuscript
- Text: Evangelistarium †
- Date: 13th-century
- Script: Greek
- Found: 1871
- Now at: British Library
- Size: 24.3 cm by 18.5 cm
- Type: Byzantine text-type

Lectionary 331 (Gregory-Aland), designated by siglum ℓ 331 (in the Gregory-Aland numbering) is a Greek manuscript of the New Testament, on parchment. Palaeographically it has been assigned to the 13th-century. The manuscript has not survived in complete condition.

== Description ==
The original codex contained lessons from the Gospel of John (Evangelistarium), with lacunae on 118 parchment leaves. The leaves are measured (24.3 cm by 18.5 cm). It begins at John 17:20.

The text is written in Greek minuscule letters, in two columns per page, 25–29 lines per page.

The codex contains weekday Gospel lessons from Easter to Pentecost and Saturday/Sunday Gospel lessons for the other weeks.

== History ==
According to the colophon it was written in 1272. It is presently assigned by the INTF to the 13th-century.

It was written by a monk named Cosmas for one Basilius.

It was purchased from Ivor B. Guest in 1871 (along with lectionary 330). It was examined and described by Oscar von Gebhardt in 1881.

The manuscript was added to the list of New Testament manuscripts by Scrivener (280^{e}) and Gregory (number 331^{e}). Gregory saw it in 1883.

Currently the codex is housed at the British Library (Add MS 28818) in London.

The fragment is not cited in critical editions of the Greek New Testament (UBS4, NA28).

== See also ==
- List of New Testament lectionaries
- Biblical manuscript
- Textual criticism
- Lectionary 330

== Bibliography ==
- Gregory, Caspar René (1900). Textkritik des Neuen Testaments. Vol. 1. Leipzig: J.C. Hinrichs’sche Buchhandlung. p. 416.
