= Lectionary 319 =

Lectionary ℓ 319
- New Testament manuscript
- Text: Evangelistarium †
- Date: 12th century
- Script: Greek
- Found: 1856
- Now at: British Library
- Size: 31.3 cm by 25.8 cm
- Type: Byzantine text-type

Lectionary 319 (Gregory-Aland), designated by siglum ℓ 319 (in the Gregory-Aland numbering) is a Greek manuscript of the New Testament, on parchment. Palaeographically it has been assigned to the 12th century. The manuscript has not survived in complete condition.

== Description ==
The original codex contained lessons from the Gospel of John, Matthew, and Luke (Evangelistarium), on 360 fragment parchment leaves. The leaves are measured (31.3 cm by 25.8 cm). Several leaves at the end were lost.

The text is written in Greek minuscule letters, in two columns per page, 20 lines per page. It has musical notes and pictures. It contains decorated headpieces and initial letters.

The codex contains weekday Gospel lessons.

== History ==
Scrivener dated the manuscript to the 13th century, Gregory dated it to the 12th or 13th century. It is presently assigned by the INTF to the 12th century.

It was purchased for the British Museum from Messrs Boone, on 12 April 1856.

The manuscript was added to the list of New Testament manuscripts by Scrivener (267^{e}) and Gregory (number 319^{e}). Gregory saw it in 1883.

Currently the codex is housed at the British Library (Add MS 21260) in London.

The fragment is not cited in critical editions of the Greek New Testament (UBS4, NA28).

== See also ==
- List of New Testament lectionaries
- Biblical manuscript
- Textual criticism
- Lectionary 318

== Bibliography ==
- Gregory, Caspar René (1900). Textkritik des Neuen Testaments. Vol. 1. Leipzig: J.C. Hinrichs’sche Buchhandlung. p. 415.
- M. Richard (1952). Inventaire des manuscrits grecs du British Museum I, Fonds Sloane, Additional, Egerton, Cottonian et Stowe. Paris. p. 37.
