= Lectionary 329 =

Lectionary ℓ 329
- New Testament manuscript
- Text: Evangelistarium †
- Date: 11th century
- Script: Greek
- Found: 1860
- Now at: British Library
- Size: 20.4 cm by 15 cm
- Type: Byzantine text-type

Lectionary 329 (Gregory-Aland), designated by siglum ℓ 329 (in the Gregory-Aland numbering) is a Greek manuscript of the New Testament, on parchment. Palaeographically it has been assigned to the 11th century. The manuscript has not survived in complete condition.

== Description ==
The original codex contained lessons from the Gospel of John, Matthew, and Luke (Evangelistarium), with lacunae on 115 parchment leaves. The leaves are measured (20.4 cm by 15 cm).

The text is written in Greek minuscule letters, in two columns per page, 28 lines per page.

It does not contain musical notes.

The codex contains weekday Gospel lessons from Easter to Pentecost and Saturday/Sunday Gospel lessons for the other weeks.

== History ==
Scrivener and Gregory dated the manuscript to the 11th or 12th century. It has been assigned by the Institute for New Testament Textual Research to the 11th century.

It once belonged to Sir F. Gage. It was purchased from Boone in 1860.

The manuscript was added to the list of New Testament manuscripts by Frederick Henry Ambrose Scrivener (278^{e}) and Caspar René Gregory (number 329^{e}). Gregory saw it in 1883.

The codex is housed at the British Library (Add MS 27860) in London.

The fragment is not cited in critical editions of the Greek New Testament (UBS4, NA28).

== See also ==
- List of New Testament lectionaries
- Biblical manuscript
- Textual criticism
- Lectionary 328

== Bibliography ==
- Gregory, Caspar René (1900). Textkritik des Neuen Testaments. Vol. 1. Leipzig: J.C. Hinrichs’sche Buchhandlung. p. 415–416.
