= Lectionary 317 =

Lectionary ℓ 317
- New Testament manuscript
- Text: Evangelistarium †
- Date: 9th century
- Script: Greek
- Now at: British Library
- Size: 16.7 cm by 11.8 cm
- Type: Byzantine text-type

Lectionary 317 (Gregory-Aland), designated by siglum ℓ 317 (in the Gregory-Aland numbering) is a Greek manuscript of the New Testament, on parchment. Palaeographically it has been assigned to the 9th century. The manuscript has survived in a fragmentary condition.

== Description ==
The original codex contained lessons from the Gospel of John, Matthew, and Luke (Evangelistarium), on 18 fragment parchment leaves. Some leaves at the codex were lost. The leaves are measured (16.7 cm by 11.8 cm). It is a palimpsest, the upper text is in Syriac.

The text is written in Greek uncial letters, in one column per page, 20 lines per page.

The codex contains Gospel lessons in the Byzantine Church order.

== History ==
Scrivener dated the manuscript to the 8th century, Gregory dated it to the 9th century. It is presently assigned by the INTF to the 9th century.

The manuscript was added to the list of New Testament manuscripts by Scrivener (497^{e}) and Gregory (number 317^{e}). Gregory saw it in 1883.

Currently the codex is housed at the British Library (Add MS 14638) in London.

The fragment is not cited in critical editions of the Greek New Testament (UBS4, NA28).

== See also ==
- List of New Testament lectionaries
- Biblical manuscript
- Textual criticism
- Lectionary 316

== Bibliography ==
- Gregory, Caspar René (1900). Textkritik des Neuen Testaments. Vol. 1. Leipzig: J.C. Hinrichs’sche Buchhandlung. p. 414.
