= Lectionary 326 =

Lectionary ℓ 326
- New Testament manuscript
- Text: Evangelistarium †
- Date: 13th century
- Script: Greek
- Found: 1862
- Now at: British Library
- Size: 30.3 cm by 22 cm
- Type: Byzantine text-type

Lectionary 326 (Gregory-Aland), designated by siglum ℓ 326 (in the Gregory-Aland numbering) is a Greek manuscript of the New Testament, on parchment. Palaeographically it has been assigned to the 13th century. The manuscript has not survived in complete condition.

== Description ==
The original codex contained lessons from the Gospel of John and Gospel of Luke (Evangelistarium), on 182 parchment leaves. The leaves are measured (30.3 cm by 22 cm).

Originally it contained lessons from the Gospel of Matthew, but this part of the codex lost. Some additional notes were added by a later hand. It has musical notes.

The text is written in Greek minuscule letters, in two columns per page, 21 lines per page. Folio 180 is a palimpsest, it was overwritten.

The codex contains weekday Gospel lessons from Easter to Pentecost and Saturday/Sunday Gospel lessons for the other weeks.

== History ==
Scrivener dated the manuscript to the 14th or 12th century. Gregory dated it to the 13th century. It has been assigned by the Institute for New Testament Textual Research to the 13th century.

The name of scribe was Michael.

It was purchased from H. Stanhope Freeman in 1862.

The manuscript was added to the list of New Testament manuscripts by Scrivener (274^{e}) and Gregory (number 326^{e}). Gregory saw it in 1883.

The codex is housed at the British Library (Add MS 24377) in London.

The fragment is not cited in critical editions of the Greek New Testament (UBS4, NA28).

== See also ==
- List of New Testament lectionaries
- Biblical manuscript
- Textual criticism
- Lectionary 325

== Bibliography ==
- Gregory, Caspar René (1900). Textkritik des Neuen Testaments. Vol. 1. Leipzig: J.C. Hinrichs’sche Buchhandlung. p. 415.
