= Lectionary 320 =

Lectionary ℓ 320
- New Testament manuscript
- Text: Evangelistarium †
- Date: 14th century
- Script: Greek
- Found: 1856
- Now at: British Library
- Size: 21.7 cm by 14.6 cm
- Type: Byzantine text-type

Lectionary 320 (Gregory-Aland), designated by siglum ℓ 320 (in the Gregory-Aland numbering), is a Greek manuscript of the New Testament, on parchment. Palaeographically it has been assigned to the 14th century. The manuscript has not survived in complete condition.

== Description ==
The original codex contained lessons from the Gospel of John, Matthew, and Luke (Evangelistarium), on 196 parchment leaves. The leaves are measured (21.7 cm by 14.6 cm). Some leaves of the codex at the end were lost. It was written by several hands.

The text is written in Greek minuscule letters, in one column per page, 19-20 lines per page. It has not musical notes.

The codex contains weekday Gospel lessons from Easter to Pentecost and Saturday/Sunday Gospel lessons for the other weeks.

On folio 66 there is a note in red ink recording the work of a certain Makarios, monk and priest, also called Zographos. The note states:

Μακάριος Μοναχὸς ἀμάρτολος ἱερεὺς
οὗτος τὸ ἐπήκλην ζογράφος διὰ σινεργασίας
Καὶ μόχθου ἐπ(λ)ιρόθη ἡ βήβλο(ς) αὔτι.

== History ==
Scrivener dated the manuscript to the 13th century, Gregory dated it to the 14th century. It has been assigned by the Institute for New Testament Textual Research to the 14th century.

It was purchased for the British Museum from Mr Henry Stevens, on 12 April 1856.

The manuscript was added to the list of New Testament manuscripts by Scrivener (268^{e}) and Gregory (number 320^{e}). Gregory saw it in 1883.

The manuscript was mentioned by Catalogue of Additions to the Manuscripts in the British Museum, 1854-1860, and by M. Richard.

The codex is housed at the British Library (Add MS 21261) in London.

The fragment is not cited in critical editions of the Greek New Testament (UBS4, NA28).

== See also ==
- List of New Testament lectionaries
- Biblical manuscript
- Textual criticism
- Lectionary 319
- Lectionary 325

== Bibliography ==
- Gregory, Caspar René (1900). Textkritik des Neuen Testaments. Vol. 1. Leipzig: J.C. Hinrichs’sche Buchhandlung. p. 415.
