= Lectionary 325 =

Lectionary ℓ 325
- New Testament manuscript
- Text: Evangelistarium †
- Date: 13th century
- Script: Greek
- Found: 1862
- Now at: British Library
- Size: 29.5 cm by 23.1 cm
- Type: Byzantine text-type

Lectionary 325 (Gregory-Aland), designated by siglum ℓ 325 (in the Gregory-Aland numbering) is a Greek manuscript of the New Testament, on parchment. Palaeographically it has been assigned to the 13th century. The manuscript has not survived in complete condition.

== Description ==
The original codex contained lessons from the Gospel of Luke (Evangelistarium), on 90 parchment leaves. The leaves are measured (29.5 cm by 23.1 cm). It contains Menologion on four folios. One folio was added in the 14th century.

The text is written in Greek minuscule letters, in two columns per page, 18 lines per page. It has musical notes.

== History ==
Scrivener and Gregory dated the manuscript to the 13th century. It has been assigned by the INTF to the 13th century.

It was purchased in 1862 by the British Museum from Henry Stanhope Freeman.

The manuscript was added to the list of New Testament manuscripts by Scrivener (273^{e}) and Gregory (number 325^{e}). Gregory saw it in 1883.

The codex is housed at the British Library (Add MS 22374) in London.

The fragment is not cited in critical editions of the Greek New Testament (UBS4, NA28).

== See also ==
- List of New Testament lectionaries
- Biblical manuscript
- Textual criticism
- Lectionary 326

== Bibliography ==
- Gregory, Caspar René (1900). Textkritik des Neuen Testaments. Vol. 1. Leipzig: J.C. Hinrichs’sche Buchhandlung. p. 415.
