= Lectionary 78 =

Lectionary ℓ 78
- New Testament manuscript
- Text: Evangelistarion
- Date: 12th-century
- Script: Greek
- Now at: Bibliothèque nationale de France
- Size: 25.5 cm by 19.1 cm

Lectionary 78, designated by siglum ℓ 78 (in the Gregory-Aland numbering), is a Greek manuscript of the New Testament, on vellum leaves. Palaeographically it has been assigned to the 12th-century.

== Description ==
The codex contains Lessons from the Gospels of John, Matthew, Luke lectionary (Evangelistarium) with some lacunae. It is written in Greek minuscule letters, on only one parchment leaf (25.5 cm by 19.1 cm), in 2 columns per page, 28 lines per page. It contains musical notes. It was supplied in the 14th century on paper leaves.

== History ==
The manuscript was partially examined by Scholz and Paulin Martin. C. R. Gregory saw it in 1885.

The manuscript is not cited in the critical editions of the Greek New Testament (UBS3).

Currently the codex is located in the Bibliothèque nationale de France (Gr. 298) in Paris.

== See also ==
- List of New Testament lectionaries
- Biblical manuscript
- Textual criticism
