= Lectionary 77 =

Lectionary ℓ 77
- New Testament manuscript
- Text: Evangelistarion
- Date: 12th-century
- Script: Greek
- Now at: Bibliothèque nationale de France
- Size: 27.9 cm by 21.8 cm

Lectionary 77, designated by siglum ℓ 77 (in the Gregory-Aland numbering), is a Greek manuscript of the New Testament, on vellum leaves. Palaeographically it has been assigned to the 12th-century.

== Description ==
The codex contains lessons from the Gospels of John, Matthew, Luke lectionary (Evangelistarium) with some lacunae. It is written in Greek minuscule letters, on 258 parchment leaves (27.9 cm by 21.8 cm), in 2 columns per page, 20 lines per page.

== History ==
The manuscript was brought from Constantinople to Paris.

It was partially examined by Scholz and Paulin Martin. C. R. Gregory saw it in 1885.

The manuscript is not cited in the critical editions of the Greek New Testament (UBS3).

Currently the codex is located in the Bibliothèque nationale de France (Gr. 296) in Paris.

== See also ==
- List of New Testament lectionaries
- Biblical manuscript
- Textual criticism
