= Lectionary 58 =

Lectionary ℓ 58
- New Testament manuscript
- Text: Evangelistarion
- Date: 16th-century
- Script: Greek
- Now at: Bibliothèque nationale de France
- Size: 28 cm by 21 cm

Lectionary 58, designated by siglum ℓ 58 (in the Gregory-Aland numbering), is a Greek manuscript of the New Testament, on paper leaves. Palaeographically it has been assigned to the 16th century.

== Description ==
The codex contains only five lessons from the Gospel of Matthew and Gospel of Luke. It is a lectionary (Evangelistarion). It is written in Greek minuscule letters, on 49 paper leaves (28 cm by 21 cm). Written in one column per page, in 10–11 lines per page.

== History ==
The manuscript was brought from some church in Greece. It was added to the list of New Testament manuscripts by Scholz.

It was examined and described by Paulin Martin C. R. Gregory saw it in 1884.

The manuscript is not cited in the critical editions of the Greek New Testament (UBS3).

Currently the codex is located in the Bibliothèque nationale de France, (Suppl. Gr. 50) in Paris.

== See also ==
- List of New Testament lectionaries
- Biblical manuscript
- Textual criticism
