= Lectionary 96 =

Greek manuscript

Lectionary ℓ 96
- New Testament manuscript
- Text: Evangelistarion, Apostolos
- Date: 16th-century
- Script: Greek
- Now at: Bibliothèque nationale de France
- Size: 21.8 cm by 14.5 cm

Lectionary 96, designated by siglum ℓ 96 (in the Gregory-Aland numbering), is a Greek manuscript of the New Testament, on paper leaves. Palaeographically it has been assigned to the 16th century.

== Description ==
The codex contains lessons from the books of New Testament lectionary (Evangelistarion, Apostolos) with some lacunae at the beginning and end. It is written in Greek minuscule letters, on 171 paper leaves (21.8 cm by 14.5 cm). The writing stands in one column per page, 25 lines per page. It contains short Menologion.

== History ==
The manuscript was added to the list of New Testament manuscripts by Scholz. It was examined and described by Paulin Martin. C. R. Gregory saw it in 1885.

The manuscript is not cited in the critical editions of the Greek New Testament (UBS3).

Currently the codex is located in the Bibliothèque nationale de France (Suppl. Gr. 115) in Paris.

== See also ==
- List of New Testament lectionaries
- Biblical manuscript
- Textual criticism
