= List of New Testament lectionaries =

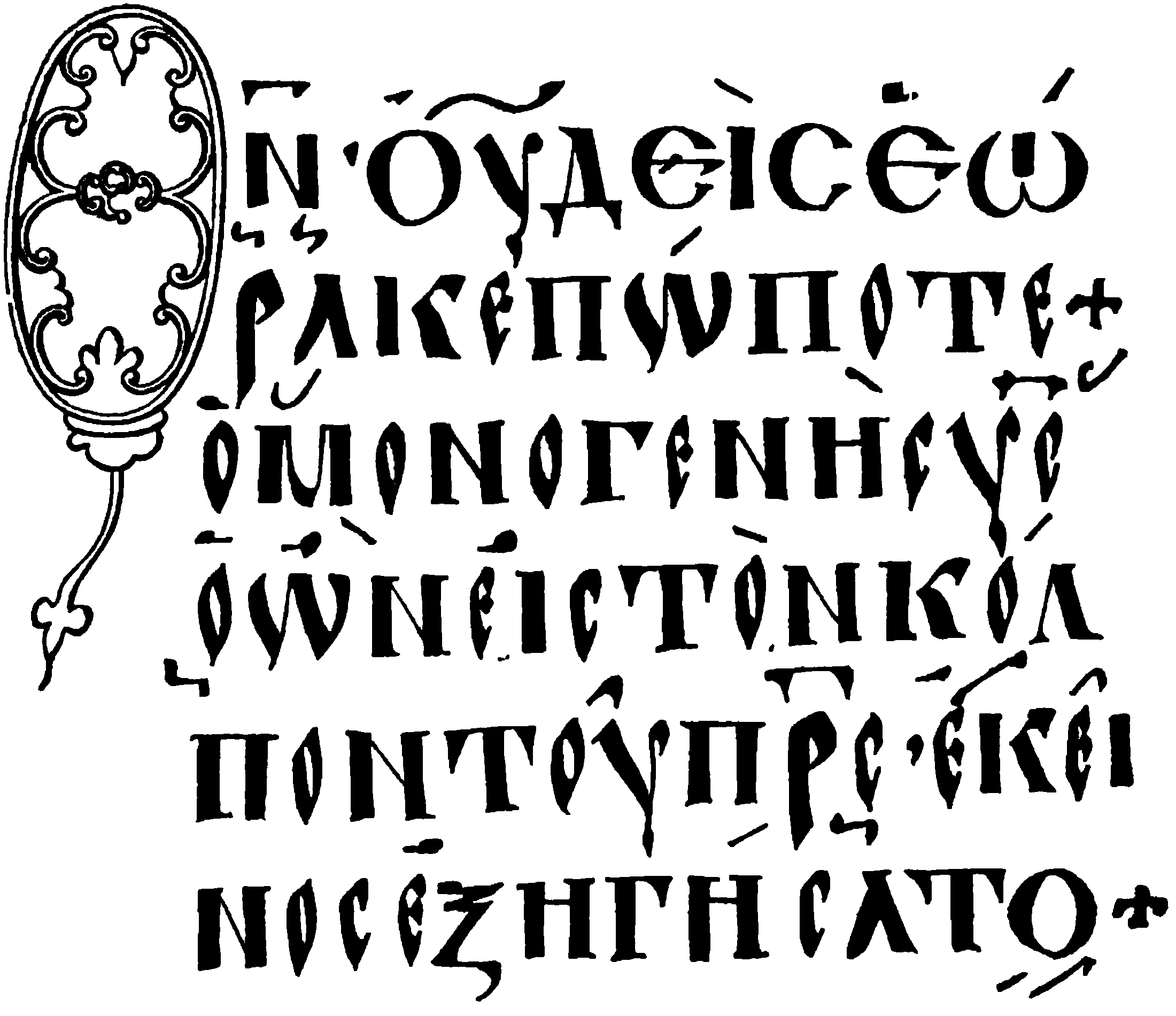
Codex Harcleianus (Lectionary 150)

A New Testament lectionary is a handwritten copy of a lectionary, or book of New Testament Bible readings. Lectionaries may be written in majuscule or minuscule Greek letters, on parchment, papyrus, vellum, or paper.

New Testament lectionaries are distinct from:

- New Testament papyri
- New Testament majuscules
- New Testament minuscules

Lectionaries which have the Gospels readings are called Evangeliaria or Evangelistaria, those which have the Acts or Epistles, Apostoli or Praxapostoli. They appear from the 6th century.

Before Scholz only 57 Gospel lectionaries and 20 Apostoloi were known. Scholz added to the list 58-181 Evangelistarioi and 21-58 Apostoloi. Gregory in 1909 enumerated 2234 lectionaries. To the present day 2484 lectionary manuscripts have been catalogued by the (INTF) in Münster.

== Legend ==
- The numbers (#) are the now standard system of Caspar René Gregory (Gregory–Aland).
- Dates are estimated to the nearest century (except lectionaries dated by scribes which are shown in the Date column).
- Content only the Gospel lessons (Evangelistarion), and other lessons from the rest of the NT apart from Revelation (Apostolos). Sometimes the surviving portion of a codex is so limited that specific books, chapters or even verses can be indicated. Linked articles, where they exist, generally specify content in detail, by verse.
- Digital images are referenced with direct links to the hosting web pages. The quality and accessibility of the images is as follows:

Gold color indicates high resolution color images available online.
Tan color indicates high resolution color images available locally, not online.
Light tan color indicates only a small fraction of manuscript pages with color images available online.
Light gray color indicates black/white or microfilm images available online.
Light blue color indicates manuscript not imaged, and is currently lost or ownership unknown.
Light pink color indicates manuscript destroyed, presumed destroyed, or deemed too fragile to digitize.
Violet color indicates high resolution ultraviolet images available online.

Contents Legend:
† Indicates the manuscript has damaged or missing pages.
^{P} Indicates only a portion of the original book remains.
^{K} Indicates manuscript also includes commentary notes.
^{sel} Indicates contents include Scripture readings for selected days only.
^{e} Indicates contents include weekday Scripture readings.
^{esk} Indicates contents include weekday Scripture readings from Easter to Pentecost and Saturday/Sunday readings for other weeks.
^{sk} Indicates contents include only Saturday and Sunday Scripture readings.
^{Lit} Indicates Liturgical book containing an assortment of New Testament texts.
^{PsO} Indicates a Psalter with Biblical Odes.
[ ] Brackets around Gregory-Aland number indicate the number is no longer is use.

Script Legend:
ΑΩ indicates Majuscule script
αω indicates Minuscule script
P^{U} indicates manuscript is a palimpsest and script is the text under the later script.
P^{O} indicates manuscript is a palimpsest and script is the text over the prior script.

== List of named or notable lectionaries ==
=== Lectionaries 1–100 ===
#	Date	Contents	Script	Pages	Institution	City, State	Country	Images
ℓ 1	10th	†Gospels^{sel}	ΑΩ	265	National Library, Grec 278	Paris	France	BnF
ℓ 2	10th	†Gospels^{e}	ΑΩ	257	National Library, Grec 280	Paris	France	BnF
ℓ 3	11th	†Gospels^{esk}	ΑΩ	281	Lincoln College, Gr. 15	Oxford	UK	INTF
ℓ 4	11th	Gospels^{esk}	αω	199	Cambridge University Library, Dd. 8.49	Cambridge	UK	INTF
ℓ 5	10th	†Gospels^{esk}	ΑΩ	150	Bodleian Library, MS. Barocci 202	Oxford	UK	DB
ℓ 5	10th	†Gospels^{esk}	ΑΩ	150	Bodleian Library, MS. Barocci 202	Oxford	UK	INTF
ℓ 6	1265	Gospels + Apostles^{sel}	ΑΩ	275	Leiden University Library, Or. 243	Leiden	Netherlands	INTF
ℓ 7	1204	Gospels^{e}	αω	316	National Library, Grec 301	Paris	France	BnF
ℓ 8	14th	Gospels^{e}	αω	309	National Library, Grec 312	Paris	France	BnF
ℓ 9	13th	Gospels^{e}	αω	260	National Library, Grec 307	Paris	France	BnF
ℓ 10	13th	†Gospels^{sel}	αω	142	National Library, Grec 287	Paris	France	BnF
ℓ 11	13th	†Gospels^{esk}	αω	142	National Library, Grec 309	Paris	France	BnF
ℓ 12	13th	†Gospels^{e}	αω	366	National Library, Grec 310	Paris	France	BnF, INTF
ℓ 13	12th	Gospels^{esk}	ΑΩ	283	National Library, Coislin 31	Paris	France	BnF
ℓ 14	16th	Gospels^{e}	αω	348	National Library, Grec 315	Paris	France	BnF
ℓ 15	13th	Gospels^{e}	αω	310	National Library, Grec 302	Paris	France	BnF
ℓ 16	12th	Gospels^{esk}	αω	199	National Library, Grec 297	Paris	France	INTF
ℓ 17	9th	†Gospels^{esk}	ΑΩ	192	National Library, Grec 279	Paris	France	BnF, INTF
ℓ 18	12th	†Gospels^{e}	αω	276	Bodleian Library, MS. Laud. Gr. 32	Oxford	UK	INTF
ℓ 19	13th	†Gospels^{e}	αω	332	Bodleian Library, MS. Auct. D. inf. 2. 12	Oxford	UK	INTF
ℓ 20	1047	†Gospels^{esk}	αω	177	Bodleian Library, MS. Laud. Gr. 34	Oxford	UK	INTF
ℓ 21	14th	†Matthew, †Luke	αω	59	Bodleian Library, MS. Arch. Selden. B. 56	Oxford	UK	INTF
ℓ 22	14th	†John	αω	63	Bodleian Library, MS. Arch. Selden. B. 54, fol. 155-217	Oxford	UK	INTF
ℓ 23	11th	†Apostles^{esk}	αω	230	British Library, Cotton MS Vespasian B XVIII	London	UK	INTF
ℓ 24	10th	†Gospels^{esk}	ΑΩ	265	Bavarian State Library, Cod.graec. 383	Munich	Germany	BSB, INTF
ℓ 25	13th	†Gospels^{esk}	αω P^{O}	159	British Library, Harley MS 5650	London	UK	BL
ℓ 26	13th	†Gospels^{esk}	αω P^{O}	180	Bodleian Library, Selden Supra 2	Oxford	UK	INTF
ℓ 27	14th	†Matthew, †Luke	αω P^{O}	150	Bodleian Library, Selden Supra 3	Oxford	UK	INTF
ℓ 28	13th	†Gospels^{esk}	αω	198	Bodleian Library, MS. Auct. D. inf. 2. 14	Oxford	UK	INTF
ℓ 29	12th	†Gospels^{esk}	αω	156	Bodleian Library, MS. Auct. D. inf. 2. 15	Oxford	UK	INTF
ℓ 30	1225	Gospels + Apostles^{Lit}	αω	105	Bodleian Library, Cromwell MS 11, p. 149-340	Oxford	UK	INTF
ℓ 31	12th	Gospels^{esk}	αω	281	Library, Ms. Cent. V. App. 40	Nuremberg	Germany	INTF
ℓ 32	11th	Gospels^{esk}	αω	273	Landesbibliothek, Memb. I 78	Gotha	Germany	INTF
[ℓ 33]= ℓ 563								
ℓ 34	9th	†Gospels^{e}	ΑΩ	430	Bavarian State Library, Cod.graec. 329	Munich	Germany	BSB, INTF
ℓ 35	11th	†Gospels^{sel}	ΑΩ	151	Vatican Library, Vat. gr. 351	Vatican City	Vatican	DVL
ℓ 35	11th	†Gospels^{sel}	ΑΩ	151	Vatican Library, Vat. gr. 351	Vatican City	Vatican	INTF
ℓ 36	10th	†Gospels^{e}	ΑΩ	268	Vatican Library, Vat. gr. 1067	Vatican City	Vatican	INTF
ℓ 37	12th	†Gospels^{esk}	αω	184	Vatican Library, Borg. gr. 6	Vatican City	Vatican	DVL
ℓ 37	12th	†Gospels^{esk}	αω	184	Vatican Library, Borg. gr. 6	Vatican City	Vatican	INTF
ℓ 38	15th	†Apostles^{esk}	αω	56	University of Göttingen, Cod. Ms. theol. 33	Göttingen	Germany	INTF
ℓ 39	13th	Gospels + Apostles^{esk}	αω	139	National Library, Supplement Grec 104	Paris	France	BnF, INTF
ℓ 40	10th	†Gospels^{esk}	ΑΩ	207	Escorial, Ψ. III. 14	El Escorial	Spain	INTF
ℓ 41	11th	Gospels^{esk}	ΑΩ	204	Escorial, X. III. 12	El Escorial	Spain	INTF
ℓ 42	10th	†Gospels^{esk}	ΑΩ	224	Escorial, X. III. 13	El Escorial	Spain	INTF
ℓ 43	13th	†Gospels^{e}	αω	313	Escorial, X. III. 16	El Escorial	Spain	INTF
ℓ 44	12th	Gospels + Apostles^{sk}	αω	195	Royal Danish Library, GKS 1324, 4°	Copenhagen	Denmark	INTF
ℓ 45	10th	Gospels^{P}	ΑΩ	6	Austrian National Library, Cod. Jur. gr. 5, fol. 575-580	Vienna	Austria	INTF
ℓ 46	9th	Gospels^{sel}	ΑΩ	182	Victor Emmanuel III National Library, Cod. Neapol. ex Vind. 2	Naples	Italy	INTF
ℓ 47	10th	Gospels^{esk}	ΑΩ	246	State Historical Museum, V. 11, S. 42	Moscow	Russia	INTF
ℓ 48	1055	Gospels^{e}	αω	250	State Historical Museum, V. 15, S. 43	Moscow	Russia	INTF
ℓ 49	10th/11th	Gospels^{e}	αω	437	State Historical Museum, V. 12, S. 225	Moscow	Russia	INTF
ℓ 50	14th	†Gospels^{esk}	ΑΩ	231	State Historical Museum, V. 10, S. 226	Moscow	Russia	INTF
ℓ 51	14th	†Gospels^{P}	αω	44	State Historical Museum, V. 20, S. 224	Moscow	Russia	INTF
ℓ 52	14th	Gospels + Apostles^{Lit}	αω	244	State Historical Museum, V. 261, S. 279	Moscow	Russia	
ℓ 53	15th	Gospels + Apostles^{Lit}	αω	332	State Historical Museum, V. 262, S. 280	Moscow	Russia	
ℓ 54	1470	Gospels + Apostles^{Lit}	αω	344	State Historical Museum, V. 263, S. 281	Moscow	Russia	
ℓ 55	1602	Gospels + Apostles^{Lit}	αω	581	State Historical Museum, V. 264, S. 454	Moscow	Russia	
ℓ 56	15th/16th	Gospels + Apostles^{Lit}	αω	462	State Historical Museum, V. 392, S. 466	Moscow	Russia	INTF
ℓ 57	15th	Apostles^{Lit}	αω	408	Saxon State Library, A. 151	Dresden	Germany	CSNTM
ℓ 57	15th	Apostles^{Lit}	αω	408	Saxon State Library, A. 151	Dresden	Germany	SSL
ℓ 58	16th	Gospels^{Lit}	αω	49	National Library, Supplement Grec 50	Paris	France	BnF
ℓ 59	11th	Apostles^{e}	αω	311	State Historical Museum, V. 21, S. 4	Moscow	Russia	INTF
ℓ 60	1021	Gospels + Apostles^{esk}	αω	195	National Library, Grec 375	Paris	France	BnF, CSNTM
ℓ 61	12th	†Gospels^{P}	αω	1	National Library, Grec 182	Paris	France	BnF
ℓ 62	12th	†Apostles^{e}	αω	276	State Historical Museum, V. 22, S. 304	Moscow	Russia	INTF
ℓ 63	9th	†Gospels^{esk}	ΑΩ	158	National Library, Grec 277	Paris	France	BnF
ℓ 64	9th	†Gospels^{esk}	ΑΩ	210	National Library, Grec 281	Paris	France	BnF
ℓ 65	9th	Gospels	ΑΩ P^{U}	213	National Library, Grec 282	Paris	France	BnF
ℓ 66	9th	Gospels	ΑΩ P^{U}	275	National Library, Grec 283	Paris	France	BnF
ℓ 67	12th	†Gospels^{P}	αω	270	National Library, Grec 284	Paris	France	BnF
ℓ 68	12th	†Gospels^{e}	αω	357	National Library, Grec 285	Paris	France	BnF
ℓ 69	12th	†Gospels^{e}	αω	257	National Library, Grec 286	Paris	France	BnF, INTF
ℓ 70	12th	†Gospels^{e}	αω	313	National Library, Grec 288	Paris	France	BnF
ℓ 71	1066	†Gospels^{esk}	αω	159	National Library, Grec 289	Paris	France	BnF, INTF
ℓ 72	13th	Gospels^{esk}	αω	187	National Library, Grec 290, fol. 4-190	Paris	France	BnF
ℓ 73	12th	†Gospels^{P}	αω	34	National Library, Grec 291	Paris	France	BnF
ℓ 74	12th	Gospels^{esk}	αω	274	National Library, Grec 292	Paris	France	BnF
ℓ 75	12th	Gospels^{e}	αω	250	National Library, Grec 293	Paris	France	BnF
ℓ 76	12th	†Gospels^{e}	αω	182	National Library, Grec 295	Paris	France	INTF
ℓ 77	12th	†Gospels^{esk}	αω	258	National Library, Grec 296	Paris	France	BnF
ℓ 78	12th	†Gospels^{esk}	αω	95	National Library, Grec 298	Paris	France	BnF
ℓ 79	14th	†Gospels^{e}	αω	126	National Library, Grec 299	Paris	France	BnF, INTF
ℓ 80	12th	Gospels^{e}	αω	128	National Library, Grec 300	Paris	France	BnF
ℓ 81	14th	†Gospels^{esk}	αω	197	National Library, Grec 305	Paris	France	INTF
ℓ 82	14th	†Gospels + Apostles^{esk}	αω	150	National Library, Grec 276	Paris	France	BnF
ℓ 83	12th	†Gospels^{e}	αω	245	National Library, Grec 294	Paris	France	BnF
ℓ 84	13th	Gospels + Apostles^{Lit}	αω	212	National Library, Supplement Grec 32	Paris	France	BnF
ℓ 85	12th	†Gospels + Apostles^{Lit}	αω	248	National Library, Supplement Grec 33	Paris	France	BnF
ℓ 86	1336	†Gospels^{e}	αω	382	National Library, Grec 311	Paris	France	BnF
ℓ 87	14th	†Gospels^{esk}	αω	121	National Library, Grec 313	Paris	France	BnF
ℓ 88	14th	†Gospels^{esk}	αω	188	National Library, Grec 314, fol. 1-178, 181-190	Paris	France	BnF
ℓ 89	14th	†Gospels^{esk}	αω	208	National Library, Grec 316	Paris	France	BnF
ℓ 90	1533	†Gospels^{esk}	αω	223	National Library, Grec 317	Paris	France	BnF
ℓ 91	14th	†Gospels^{esk}	αω	322	National Library, Grec 318	Paris	France	BnF
ℓ 92	14th	†Gospels + Apostles^{Lit}	αω	212	National Library, Grec 324	Paris	France	BnF
ℓ 93	16th	†Gospels^{Lit}	αω	144	National Library, Grec 326	Paris	France	BnF
ℓ 94	12th	†Gospels + Apostles^{Lit}	αω	176	National Library, Grec 330	Paris	France	BnF
ℓ 95	14th	†Gospels^{esk}	αω	114	National Library, Grec 374	Paris	France	BnF
ℓ 96	16th	†Gospels + Apostles^{Lit}	αω	171	National Library, Supplement Grec 115	Paris	France	BnF
ℓ 97	14th	†Apostles^{e}	αω	145	National Library, Grec 376, fol. 1-145	Paris	France	BnF
ℓ 98	15th	†Gospels^{esk}	αω P^{O}	196	National Library, Grec 377	Paris	France	BnF
ℓ 99	16th	†Gospels^{esk}	αω	243	National Library, Grec 380	Paris	France	BnF
ℓ 100	1550	Gospels^{esk}	αω	306	National Library, Grec 381	Paris	France	BnF

[top]

=== Lectionaries 101–200 ===
#	Date	Contents	Script	Pages	Institution	City, State	Country	Images
ℓ 101	14th	†Gospels^{e}	αω	279	National Library, Grec 303	Paris	France	INTF
ℓ 102	1370	Gospels^{k K}	αω	116	Ambrosiana Library, S. 62 sup.	Milan	Italy	INTF
ℓ 103	13th	Gospels^{esk}	αω	138	Ambrosiana Library, D. 67 sup.	Milan	Italy	INTF
ℓ 104	12th	Gospels + Apostles^{e}	αω	128	Ambrosiana Library, D. 72 sup.	Milan	Italy	INTF
ℓ 105	13th	†Gospels^{esk}	αω	157	Ambrosiana Library, M. 81 sup.	Milan	Italy	INTF
ℓ 106	13th	†Gospels^{esk}	αω	349	Ambrosiana Library, C. 91 sup.	Milan	Italy	INTF
ℓ 107	12th	Gospels^{esk}	αω	265	Marciana National Library, Gr. Z. 548 (787)	Venice	Italy	INTF
ℓ 108	11th	†Gospels^{e}	αω	292	Marciana National Library, Gr. Z. 549 (655)	Venice	Italy	INTF
ℓ 109	14th	Gospels^{e}	αω	206	Marciana National Library, Gr. Z. 550 (848)	Venice	Italy	INTF
ℓ 110	13th	Gospels^{esk}	αω	279	Marciana National Library, Gr. Z. 551 (826)	Venice	Italy	INTF
ℓ 111	9th	Gospels^{esk}	ΑΩ	288	Estense Library, Gr. 73 α.W.2.6	Modena	Italy	INTF
ℓ 112	11th	Gospels + Apostles^{esk}	αω	148	Laurentian Library, Conv. Soppr. 24	Florence	Italy	CSNTM, INTF
ℓ 112	11th	Gospels + Apostles^{esk}	αω	148	Laurentian Library, Conv. Soppr. 24	Florence	Italy	CSNTM
ℓ 113	13th	†Gospels^{e}	αω	341	Laurentian Library, Plut.06.02	Florence	Italy	BML, INTF
ℓ 114	14th	Gospels^{k}	αω	180	Laurentian Library, Plut.06.07	Florence	Italy	BML, INTF
ℓ 115	10th	Gospels^{esk}	ΑΩ	261	Laurentian Library, Plut.06.21	Florence	Italy	BML, INTF
ℓ 116	10th	Gospels^{esk}	ΑΩ	226	Laurentian Library, Plut.06.31	Florence	Italy	BML, INTF
ℓ 117	11th	Gospels^{sel}	αω	119	Laurentian Library, Mediceo Palatino 244	Florence	Italy	CSNTM, INTF
ℓ 118	14th	Gospels^{e}	αω	368	Laurentian Library, Mediceo Palatino 243	Florence	Italy	CSNTM, INTF
ℓ 119	13th	Gospels^{e}	αω	268	Vatican Library, Vat. gr. 1155	Vatican City	Vatican	INTF
ℓ 120	11th/12th	Gospels^{esk}	αω	344	Vatican Library, Vat. gr. 1156	Vatican City	Vatican	DVL
ℓ 120	11th/12th	Gospels^{esk}	αω	344	Vatican Library, Vat. gr. 1156	Vatican City	Vatican	INTF
ℓ 121	11th	†Gospels^{e}	αω	419	Vatican Library, Vat. gr. 1157	Vatican City	Vatican	INTF
ℓ 122	1175	Gospels^{esk}	αω	194	Vatican Library, Vat. gr. 1068	Vatican City	Vatican	INTF
ℓ 123	10th	Gospels^{sel}	ΑΩ	197	Vatican Library, Vat. gr. 1522	Vatican City	Vatican	DVL
ℓ 124	12th	†Gospels^{esk}	αω	162	Vatican Library, Vat. gr. 1988	Vatican City	Vatican	INTF
ℓ 125	11th	Gospels^{esk}	αω	123	Vatican Library, Vat. gr. 2017	Vatican City	Vatican	INTF
ℓ 126	11th	Gospels^{e}	αω	337	Vatican Library, Vat. gr. 2041	Vatican City	Vatican	INTF
ℓ 127	9th	†Gospels^{esk}	ΑΩ	178	Vatican Library, Vat. gr. 2063	Vatican City	Vatican	DVL
ℓ 128	14th	Gospels^{esk}	αω	393	Vatican Library, Vat. gr. 2133	Vatican City	Vatican	INTF
ℓ 129	12th	†Gospels^{e}	αω	339	Vatican Library, Reg. gr. 12	Vatican City	Vatican	DVL, INTF
ℓ 130	10th	Gospels^{esk}	ΑΩ	343	Vatican Library, Ott. Gr. 2	Vatican City	Vatican	DVL,
ℓ 130	10th	Gospels^{esk}	ΑΩ	343	Vatican Library, Ott. Gr. 2	Vatican City	Vatican	INTF
ℓ 131	11th	Gospels^{sel}	αω	70	Vatican Library, Ott. gr. 175	Vatican City	Vatican	DVL
ℓ 132	14th	Gospels^{sel}	αω	53	Vatican Library, Ott. gr. 326	Vatican City	Vatican	DVL
ℓ 132	14th	Gospels^{sel}	αω	53	Vatican Library, Ott. gr. 326	Vatican City	Vatican	INTF
ℓ 133	14th	Gospels + Apostles^{e}	αω	296	Vatican Library, Ott. gr. 416	Vatican City	Vatican	INTF
ℓ 134	13th	†Gospels^{e}	αω	343	Vatican Library, Barb. gr. 565	Vatican City	Vatican	INTF
ℓ 135	8th	Gospels^{P}	ΑΩ P^{U}	145	Vatican Library, Barb. gr. 472 (fol. 1-118)	Vatican City	Vatican	DVL
ℓ 136	12th	Gospels^{esk}	αω P^{O}	165	Vatican Library, Barb. gr. 472	Vatican City	Vatican	DVL
ℓ 136	12th	Gospels^{esk}	αω P^{O}	165	Vatican Library, Barb. gr. 472	Vatican City	Vatican	INTF
ℓ 137	11th	Gospels^{esk}	αω	105	Vallicelliana Library, D. 63	Rome	Italy	INTF
ℓ 138	15th	Gospels^{esk}	αω	255	Vittorio Emanuele III National Library, Ms. II. A. 6	Naples	Italy	INTF
ℓ 139	10th/11th	†Gospels^{esk}	ΑΩ	219	Marciana National Library, Gr. Z. 12	Venice	Italy	INTF
ℓ 140	13th	Gospels			Owner Unknown, Formerly: Marciana National Library, Gr. Z. 286	Venice	Italy	
ℓ 141	11th	Gospels^{esk}	αω	270	Marciana National Library, Gr. I. 9	Venice	Italy	INTF
ℓ 142	14th	Gospels^{sel}	αω	45	Marciana National Library, Gr. I. 23	Venice	Italy	INTF
ℓ 143	8th	Gospels^{P}	ΑΩ	1	Berlin State Museums, P. 8771	Berlin	Germany	BerlPap
ℓ 143	8th	Gospels^{P}	ΑΩ	3	National Library, Copte 129,19, fol. 73; Copte 129,20 fol. 151; Copte 129,20 fol. 153	Paris	France	BnF,
ℓ 143	8th	Gospels^{P}	ΑΩ	2	Vatican Library, Borg. copt. 109 (Cass. 23, Fasc. 97)	Vatican City	Vatican	
ℓ 143	8th	Gospels^{P}	ΑΩ	1	British Library, Add Or 24	London	UK	
ℓ 144	14th	Apostles^{e}	αω	302	National Library, Grec 304	Paris	France	BnF
ℓ 145	12th	Apostles^{e}	αω	187	National Library, Grec 306	Paris	France	BnF
ℓ 146	12th	Gospels^{e}	αω	212	Cambridge University Library, Dd. 8.23	Cambridge	UK	INTF
ℓ 147	12th	Apostles^{e}	αω	274	National Library, Grec 319	Paris	France	BnF
ℓ 148	12th	Apostles^{e}	αω	208	National Library, Grec 320	Paris	France	BnF
ℓ 149	14th	†Apostles^{e}	αω	237	National Library, Grec 321	Paris	France	BnF
ℓ 150	995	Gospels^{e}	ΑΩ	374	British Library, Harley MS 5598	London	UK	BL
ℓ 151	12th	Gospels^{esk}	αω	359	British Library, Harley MS 5785	London	UK	BL
ℓ 152	9th	Gospels^{esk}	ΑΩ	224	British Library, MS Harl 5787	London	UK	BL
ℓ 153	14th	Gospels + Apostles^{esk}	αω	118	National Library, Grec 373	Paris	France	INTF
ℓ 154	13th	Gospels	αω	49	Bavarian State Library, Cod. graec. 326	München	Germany	INTF
ℓ 155	10th	Gospels^{esk}	ΑΩ P^{U}	143	Austrian National Library, Theol. gr. 209	Vienna	Austria	INTF
ℓ 156	10th	Apostles^{e}	αω	271	National Library, Grec 382	Paris	France	BnF
ℓ 157	1253	†Gospels^{esk}	αω	199	Bodleian Library, E. D. Clarke 8	Oxford	UK	INTF
ℓ 158	16th	Apostles^{e}	αω	206	National Library, Grec 383	Paris	France	BnF
ℓ 159	1061	Gospels^{esk}	αω	267	Orthodox Patriarchate, Panagias	Jerusalem	Israel	INTF
ℓ 160	15th	Apostles^{e}	αω	235	Vatican Library, Vat. gr. 1528	Vatican City	Vatican	INTF
ℓ 161	16th	Apostles^{esk}	αω	115	Vallicelliana Library, C. 46, fol. 227-341	Rome	Italy	INTF
ℓ 162	12th	Apostles^{e}	αω	239	Glasgow University Library, Ms. Hunter 406	Glasgow	UK	CSNTM
ℓ 163	14th	Apostles^{esk}	αω	153	Ambrosiana Library, C. 63 sup.	Milan	Italy	INTF
ℓ 164	1172	Apostles^{e}	αω	265	Christ Church, Wake 33	Oxford	UK	INTF
ℓ 165	11th	†Apostles^{e}	αω	130	Lambeth Palace, 1190	London	UK	INTF
ℓ 166	13th	†Apostles^{esk}	αω	155	Lambeth Palace, 1191	London	UK	INTF
ℓ 167	1531	Apostles^{sk}	αω	75	Lambeth Palace, 1195	London	UK	INTF
ℓ 168	11th-12th	Apostles^{e}	αω	219	Lambeth Palace, 1196	London	UK	INTF
ℓ 169	13th	Apostles^{e}	αω	192	British Library, Add MS 32051	London	UK	BL
ℓ 170	14th	†Apostles^{e}	αω	164	University of Michigan, Ms. 35	Ann Arbor	USA	CSNTM
ℓ 171	9th	Apostles	ΑΩ P^{U}	1	Russian National Library, Gr. 38, fol. 8	Saint Petersburg	Russia	
ℓ 172	13th	Apostles^{e}	αω	281	Harvard University, Ms. Gr. 7 (2)	Cambridge	USA	INTF
ℓ 173	10th	Gospels + Apostles^{esk}	αω	178	Russian National Library, Gr. 57	Saint Petersburg	Russia	INTF
ℓ 174	13th	Gospels + Apostles	αω P^{O}	32	Russian National Library, Gr. 37; Gr. 45a; Gr. 112	Saint Petersburg	Russia	INTF
ℓ 175	15th	Apostles^{e}	αω	113	New York Public Library, Rare Books and Manuscripts, Ms. 103	New York City	USA	INTF
ℓ 176	12th	†Apostles^{sel}	αω	96	Cambridge University Library, Add. Mss. 679.1	Cambridge	UK	INTF
ℓ 177	11th	†Apostles	αω	86	British Library, Add MS 11841	London	UK	BL
ℓ 178	9th	Hebrews 1:3-12; 11:24	ΑΩ	1	University of Leipzig, Cod. Gr. 69	Leipzig	Germany	INTF
ℓ 179	10th	Gospels + Apostles^{P}	ΑΩ	8	Trier Cathedral Treasury, Hs. 72, fol. 2-9	Trier	Germany	INTF
ℓ 180	14th	†Gospels^{esk}	αω	202	Harvard University, Theol. Libr., Ms. 21	Cambridge	USA	INTF
ℓ 181	980	Gospels^{esk}	ΑΩ	222	British Library, Add MS 39602	London	UK	BL
ℓ 182	9th	Gospels^{P}	ΑΩ	3	British Library, Add MS 39583	London	UK	BL
ℓ 183	10th	†Gospels^{esk}	ΑΩ	329	British Library, Arundel MS 547	London	UK	BL
ℓ 184	1319	Gospels^{e}	αω	248	British Library, Burney MS 22	London	UK	BL
ℓ 185	11th	†Gospels^{e}	αω	218	Christ's College, GG.1.6 (Ms. 6)	Cambridge	UK	CSNTM
ℓ 186	11th	Gospels^{esk}	αω	248	Trinity College (O. IV. 22)	Cambridge	UK	INTF
ℓ 187	13th	†Gospels^{esk}	αω	217	British Library, Arundel MS 536	London	UK	BL
ℓ 188	1033	†Gospels^{esk}	αω	274	British Library, Add MS 5153	London	UK	BL,
ℓ 189	12th	†Gospels^{esk}	αω	236	British Library, Add MS 11840	London	UK	BL
ℓ 190	11th	†Gospels^{P}	αω	1	British Library, Add MS 17370	London	UK	BL
ℓ 191	12th	†Gospels^{e}	αω	297	British Library, Add MS 18212	London	UK	BL
ℓ 192	13th	†Gospels^{esk}	αω	104	British Library, Add MS 19460	London	UK	BL
ℓ 193	1334/1335	Gospels^{esk}	αω	281	British Library, Add MS 19993	London	UK	BL
ℓ 194	10th	†Gospels^{esk}	ΑΩ	259	Bodleian Library, Canon. Gr. 85	Oxford	UK	INTF
ℓ 195	11th	Gospels^{esk}	ΑΩ	483	Bodleian Library, Canon. Gr. 92	Oxford	UK	INTF
ℓ 196	15th	Gospels^{esk}	αω	155	Bodleian Library, Canon. Gr. 119	Oxford	UK	INTF
ℓ 197	15th	Matthew 25:1-13; Mark 5:24-34; Luke 1:1-25, 57-68, 76, 80; Galatians 4:6-7; 1 John 4:12-19	αω	8	Bodleian Library, Canon. Gr. 126, fol. 252-259	Oxford	UK	INTF
ℓ 198	12th	Gospels	αω	276	Bodleian Library, E. D. Clarke. 45	Oxford	UK	INTF
ℓ 199	13th	†Gospels^{esk}	αω	243	Bodleian Library, E. D. Clarke. 46	Oxford	UK	INTF
ℓ 200	12th	Gospels^{e}	αω	292	Bodleian Library, E. D. Clarke. 47	Oxford	UK	INTF

[top]

=== Lectionaries 201–300 ===
#	Date	Contents	Script	Pages	Institution	City, State	Country	Images
ℓ 201	13th	Gospels^{esk}	αω	187	Bodleian Library, E. D. Clarke. 48	Oxford	UK	INTF
ℓ 202	12th	Gospels^{e}	αω	323	Bodleian Library, Cromw. 27	Oxford	UK	INTF
ℓ 203	1067	Gospels^{e}	αω	300	Bodleian Library, Auct. F. 6. 25	Oxford	UK	INTF
ℓ 204	11th	Gospels^{sel}	αω	305	Bodleian Library, Rawl. G. 2	Oxford	UK	INTF
ℓ 205	10th	Gospels^{P}	ΑΩ P^{U}	5	Bodleian Library, Barocci 197	Oxford	UK	INTF
ℓ 206	11th	Gospels^{sel}	αω	255	Bodleian Library, Wake 13	Oxford	UK	INTF
ℓ 207	12th	Gospels^{esk}	αω	246	Bodleian Library, Wake 14	Oxford	UK	INTF
ℓ 208	11th	†Gospels^{esk}	αω	217	Bodleian Library, Wake 15	Oxford	UK	INTF
ℓ 209	12th	†Gospels^{esk}	αω	217	Bodleian Library, Wake 16	Oxford	UK	INTF
ℓ 210	12th	†Gospels^{esk}	αω	227	Bodleian Library, Wake 17	Oxford	UK	INTF
ℓ 211	12th	Gospels^{e}	αω P^{O}	209	Bodleian Library, Wake 18	Oxford	UK	INTF
ℓ 212	11th	†Gospels^{esk}	αω	248	Bodleian Library, Wake 19	Oxford	UK	INTF
ℓ 213	13th	Gospels^{e}	αω	256	Bodleian Library, Wake 23	Oxford	UK	INTF
ℓ 214	12th	Gospels^{e}	αω	144	National Library, 4079	Athens	Greece	
ℓ 215	13th/14th	Gospels^{esk}	αω	137	Owner Unknown			
ℓ 216	13th	Gospels + Apostles^{Lit}	αω	60	University of Michigan, Ms. 49	Ann Arbor	USA	CSNTM
ℓ 217	13th	Gospels^{esk}	αω	154	National Library, 4080	Athens	Greece	CSNTM
ℓ 218	15th	†Gospels^{esk}	αω	288	National Library, EBE 4095	Athens	Greece	
ℓ 219	11th	†Gospels^{e}	αω	319	National Library, EBE 4078	Athens	Greece	
ℓ 220	13th	Gospels^{esk}	αω P^{O}	161	Univ. Libr., Ms. 83	Ann Arbor	USA	CSNTM
ℓ 221	15th	Gospels^{e}	αω	156	Scriptorium, VK 1096	Orlando	USA	CSNTM
ℓ 222	13th	Gospels	αω	241	New York Public Library, Spencer Collection Greek 2	New York	New York	
ℓ 223	15th	Gospels + Apostles^{Lit}	αω	174	University of Michigan, Ms. 17	Ann Arbor	USA	CSNTM
ℓ 224	14th	Gospels^{esk}	αω	206	University of Michigan, Ms. 31	Ann Arbor	USA	CSNTM
ℓ 225	1437	Gospels^{esk}	αω	309	University of Michigan, Ms. 29	Ann Arbor	USA	CSNTM
ℓ 226	14th	†Gospels^{e}	αω	220	University of Michigan, Ms. 28	Ann Arbor	USA	CSNTM
ℓ 227	14th	†Gospels^{esk}	αω	85	University of Michigan, Ms. 32	Ann Arbor	USA	CSNTM
ℓ 228	15th	†Gospels + Apostles^{Lit}	αω	177	University of Michigan, Ms. 43	Ann Arbor	USA	CSNTM
ℓ 229	11th-12th	Gospels^{esk}	αω	177	Lambeth Palace, 1187	London	UK	INTF
ℓ 230	11th-12th	Gospels^{e}	αω	318	Lambeth Palace, 1188	London	UK	INTF
ℓ 231	14th	†Gospels^{esk}	αω	151	Lambeth Palace, 1189	London	UK	INTF
ℓ 232	11th-12th	†Gospels^{esk}	αω	153	Lambeth Palace, 1193	London	UK	INTF
ℓ 233	11th	†Gospels^{e}	αω	188	British Library, Add MS 39603	London	UK	BL
ℓ 234	11th-12th	†Gospels^{esk}	αω	246	Sion College, Arc L 40.2/G 1	London	UK	INTF
ℓ 235	11th-12th	†Gospels^{esk}	αω	143	Sion College, Arc L 40.2/G 2	London	UK	INTF
ℓ 236	11th-12th	†Gospels^{esk}	αω	217	Sion College, Arc L 40.2/G 4	London	UK	INTF
ℓ 237	12th	†Gospels^{esk}	αω	132	British Library, Add MS 36822	London	UK	BL
ℓ 238	11th	†Gospels^{e}	αω	144	British Library, Egerton MS 3046	London	UK	BL
ℓ 239	1259	†Gospels^{esk}	αω	112	Glasgow University Library, Ms. Hunter 440	Glasgow	UK	CSNTM
ℓ 240	12th	Gospels^{esk}	αω	251	Glasgow University Library, Ms. Hunter 405	Glasgow	UK	CSNTM
ℓ 241	1199	†Gospels + Apostles^{e}	αω	176	Glasgow University Library, Ms. Hunter 419	Glasgow	UK	CSNTM
[ℓ 242] = ℓ 1386								
ℓ 243	10th	Matthew 3:13-14, 6:18-21, 18:15-19, 26:14-19, 27:58-66, 28:2-7; Mark 1:9-11; Luke 9:31-33; John 2:3-9, 3:26-32, 9:2-6, 10:38, 13:5-10, 21:21-25	ΑΩ	15	Russian National Library, Gr. 21, 21a	Saint Petersburg	Russia	INTF
ℓ 244	9th	Gospels^{P}	ΑΩ	1	Russian National Library, Gr. 35	Saint Petersburg	Russia	
ℓ 245	9th	Gospels^{P}	ΑΩ	1	Russian National Library, Gr. 36	Saint Petersburg	Russia	
ℓ 246	9th	Gospels^{P}	ΑΩ	2	Russian National Library, Gr. 39	Saint Petersburg	Russia	
ℓ 247	9th	Matthew 8:8-13	ΑΩ	1	Russian National Library, Gr. 40	Saint Petersburg	Russia	INTF
ℓ 248	9th	Matthew 6:1-21, 25:31-46; Luke 15:11-32, 18:14, 21:8-9, 25-27, 33-36	ΑΩ	6	Russian National Library, Gr. 43	Saint Petersburg	Russia	INTF
ℓ 249	9th	†Gospels + Apostles^{Sel}	ΑΩ	69	Russian National Library, Gr. 44	Saint Petersburg	Russia	INTF
ℓ 250	10th	Gospels + Apostles^{esk}	ΑΩ	198	Russian National Library, Gr. 55	Saint Petersburg	Russia	INTF
ℓ 251	10th	Gospels^{e}	αω	251	Russian National Library, Gr. 56	Saint Petersburg	Russia	
ℓ 252	11th	Gospels^{e}	αω	498	Russian National Library, Gr. 69	Saint Petersburg	Russia	INTF
ℓ 253	1020	Gospels^{sk}	αω	169	Russian National Library, Gr. 71	Saint Petersburg	Russia	INTF
ℓ 254	11th	Matt 24:39, 42-44	αω	1	Russian National Library, Gr. 80	Saint Petersburg	Russia	INTF
ℓ 255	11th	Gospels^{P}	αω	41	Russian National Library, Gr. 84	Saint Petersburg	Russia	INTF
ℓ 256	12th	Gospels + Apostles^{P}	αω	93	Russian National Library, Gr. 90	Saint Petersburg	Russia	INTF
ℓ 257	1306	†Gospels + Apostles	αω	178	British Library, Add MS 29714	London	UK	BL
ℓ 258	13th	Gospels^{P}	αω	4	Russian National Library, Gr. 111	Saint Petersburg	Russia	
ℓ 259	13th	Romans 5:18-21, 8:3-14; 9:29-33; 2 Corinthians 5:15-21; Galatians 3:28-29, 5:1-5; Colossians 1:18-22; Philippians 3:3-9; 2 Timothy 3:2-9	αω	14	Bodleian Library, Auct. T. inf. 2.11	Oxford	UK	INTF
ℓ 260		Gospels			Owner Unknown			
ℓ 261	12th	Gospels^{esk}	αω	207	National Library, Supplement Grec 27	Paris	France	BnF
ℓ 262	17th	Gospels^{e}	αω	265	National Library, Supplement Grec 242	Paris	France	BnF
ℓ 263	12th	Gospels^{esk}	αω	210	Besançon Municipal Library, Ms. 45	Besançon	France	INTF
ℓ 264	1381	Gospels^{esk}	αω	209	Marciana National Library, Gr. I. 4 (1396)	Venice	Italy	INTF
ℓ 265	10th	Gospels^{P}	ΑΩ	78	Marciana National Library, Gr. I. 45 (927)	Venice	Italy	INTF
ℓ 266	12th	Gospels^{esk}	αω	50	Marciana National Library, Gr. I. 46 (1435)	Venice	Italy	INTF
ℓ 267	1046	Gospels^{e}	αω	300	Marciana National Library, Gr. I. 47 (978)	Venice	Italy	INTF
ℓ 268	12th	Gospels^{esk}	αω	281	Marciana National Library, Gr. I. 48 (1199)	Venice	Italy	INTF
ℓ 269	8th	Gospels^{P}	ΑΩ P^{U}	4	Marciana National Library, Gr. I,49 (1213), fol. 251-254	Venice	Italy	INTF
ℓ 270	14th	Gospels^{esk}	αω	403	Marciana National Library, Gr. I. 50 (1436)	Venice	Italy	INTF
ℓ 271	17th	Gospels^{P}	αω	11	Marciana National Library, Gr. I. 51 (1419)	Venice	Italy	INTF
ℓ 272	16th	Gospels^{e}	αω	276	Marciana National Library, Gr. I. 52 (1200)	Venice	Italy	INTF
ℓ 273	13th	Gospels^{P}	αω	9	Marciana National Library, Gr. II. 17 (1295)	Venice	Italy	INTF
ℓ 274	1580	Gospels + Apostles^{esk}	αω	501	Marciana National Library, Gr. II. 143 (1381)	Venice	Italy	
ℓ 275	12th	Gospels^{e}	αω	303	Marciana National Library, Gr. I. 53 (966)	Venice	Italy	INTF
ℓ 276	13th	Gospels^{e}	αω	168	Marciana National Library, Gr. I. 54 (1146)	Venice	Italy	INTF
ℓ 277	1438	Gospels^{e}	αω	387	Marciana National Library, Gr. I. 55 (967)	Venice	Italy	INTF
ℓ 278	11th	Gospels^{esk}	αω	221	Hellenic Institute of Byzantine and Post-Byzantine Studies, B'	Venice	Italy	INTF
ℓ 279	11th	Gospels^{e}	αω	415	Hellenic Institute of Byzantine and Post-Byzantine Studies, A'	Venice	Italy	INTF
ℓ 280	14th	Gospels^{e}	αω	240	Hellenic Institute of Byzantine and Post-Byzantine Studies, G'	Venice	Italy	INTF
ℓ 281	14th	Gospels^{e}	αω	236	University of Bologna, 3638	Bologna	Italy	INTF
ℓ 282	14th	Gospels^{e}	αω	160	Palatina Library, Ms. Pal. 14	Parma	Italy	INTF
ℓ 283	11th	Gospels^{e}	αω	313	Biblioteca Comunale degli Intronati, X. IV. 1	Siena	Italy	INTF
ℓ 284	10th	Matthew 26:18-20; John 13:3-12	αω	1	Ambrosiana Library, Q. 79 sup., fol. 1	Milan	Italy	INTF
ℓ 285	12th	Gospels^{P}	αω	37	Ambrosiana Library, I. 94 suss., fol. 1-37	Milan	Italy	INTF
ℓ 286	9th	Gospels^{P}	ΑΩ P^{U}	5	Ambrosiana Library, E. 101 sup.	Milan	Italy	INTF
ℓ 287	13th	Gospels^{e}	αω	201	Ambrosiana Library, D. 108 sup., fol. 3-203 (fol. 1- 2, 204: ℓ 2352)	Milan	Italy	INTF
ℓ 288	13th	†Gospels^{esk}	αω	124	Ambrosiana Library, A. 150 sup.	Milan	Italy	INTF
ℓ 289	14th	†Gospels^{e}	αω	156	Ambrosiana Library, C. 160 inf.	Milan	Italy	INTF
ℓ 290	14th	†Gospels + Apostles^{esk}	αω	198	Ambrosiana Library, P. 274 sup.	Milan	Italy	INTF
ℓ 291	13th	Gospels^{esk}	αω	181	Laurentian Library, S. Marco 706	Florence	Italy	CSNTM
ℓ 292	9th	Gospels^{e}	ΑΩ	277	Municipal Library, 10 (L 11)	Carpentras	France	INTF
ℓ 293	8th	†Gospels^{e}	ΑΩ P^{U}	89	University of Leipzig, Cod. Gr. 3	Leipzig	Germany	INTF
ℓ 294	9th/10th	John 1:38-48	αω	1	University of Tübingen, Mb. 4	Tübingen	Germany	INTF
ℓ 295	10th	Gospels^{P}	αω	1	Owner unknown			
ℓ 296	10th	Gospels^{P}	ΑΩ	6	Houghton Library, Harvard University, Ms. Gr. 6	Cambridge	USA	INTF
ℓ 297	13th	†Gospels^{esk}	αω	230	Houghton Library, Harvard University, Ms. Gr. 7 (1)	Cambridge	USA	INTF
ℓ 298	14th	Gospels^{e}	αω	202	Houghton Library, Harvard University, Ms. Gr. 12	Cambridge	USA	INTF
ℓ 299	13th	†Gospels^{e}	αω P^{O}	176	Cambridge University Library, MS Additional 10062	Cambridge	UK	INTF
ℓ 300	11th	Gospels^{sel}	ΑΩ	204	Saint Catherine's Monastery, Ms. Gr. 12	Sinai	Egypt	CSNTM

[top]

=== Lectionaries 301–400 ===
#	Date	Contents	Script	Pages	Institution	City, State	Country	Images
ℓ 301	13th	†Gospels^{esk}	αω	334	Drew University, 2	Madison	USA	CSNTM
ℓ 302	15th (paper)	†Gospels^{e}	αω	199	Duke University, Gk Ms 83	Durham	USA	DU, INTF
ℓ 303	12th	Gospels^{e}	αω	340	Princeton Theological Seminary, 11.21.1900	Princeton	USA	INTF
ℓ 304+[ℓ 1677]	14th	†Gospels^{e}	αω	219	Lutheran School of Theology at Chicago, Gruber MS 111	Chicago	USA	CSNTM
ℓ 305	12th	Gospels^{sel}	αω	171	Cambridge University Library, Add. Mss. 679.2	Cambridge	UK	INTF
ℓ 306	13th	†Gospels^{k}	αω	136	Cambridge University Library, Add. Mss. 1836	Cambridge	UK	INTF
ℓ 307	12th	†Gospels^{esk}	αω	104	Cambridge University Library, Add. Mss. 1839	Cambridge	UK	INTF
ℓ 308	11th	†Gospels^{e}	αω	112	Cambridge University Library, Add. Mss. 1840	Cambridge	UK	INTF
ℓ 309	10th	Gospels^{P}	αω	8	Cambridge University Library, Add. Mss. 1879.2	Cambridge	UK	INTF
ℓ 310	11th	Gospels^{P}	αω	4	Cambridge University Library, Add. Mss. 1879.12	Cambridge	UK	INTF
ℓ 311	12th	Gospels^{P}	αω	4	Cambridge University Library, Add. Mss. 1879.13	Cambridge	UK	INTF
ℓ 312	9th	†Gospels^{P}	ΑΩ	2	Saint Catherine's Monastery	Sinai	Egypt	
ℓ 313	14th	†Gospels^{e}	αω	209	University of Michigan, Ms. 33	Ann Arbor	USA	CSNTM
ℓ 314	12th	Gospels^{P}	αω	2	Brown University, Koopmann MS Greek 3	Providence	USA	
ℓ 315	16th	Gospels + Apostles^{Lit}	αω	316	Owner unknown			
ℓ 316	8th	Gospels^{P}	ΑΩ P^{U}	23	British Library, Add MS 14637	London	UK	
ℓ 317	9th	Gospels^{P}	ΑΩ P^{U}	18	British Library, Add MS 14638	London	UK	INTF
ℓ 318	12th	†Gospels^{e}	αω	279	British Library, Add MS 19737	London	UK	BL
ℓ 319	12th	Gospels^{e}	αω	360	British Library, Add MS 21260	London	UK	BL
ℓ 320	14th	†Gospels^{esk}	αω	196	British Library, Add MS 21261	London	UK	BL
ℓ 321	12th	Gospels^{e}	αω	304	British Library, Add MS 22735	London	UK	BL
ℓ 322	11th	Gospels^{P}	αω	79	British Library, Add MS 22742	London	UK	BL
ℓ 323	13th	Gospels^{e}	αω	213	British Library, Add MS 22743	London	UK	BL
ℓ 324	13th	†Gospels^{e}	αω	189	British Library, Add MS 22744	London	UK	BL
ℓ 325	13th	†Gospels^{P}	αω	90	British Library, Add MS 24374	London	UK	BL
ℓ 326	13th	†Gospels^{esk}	αω	182	British Library, Add MS 24377	London	UK	BL
ℓ 327	14th	†Gospels^{e}	αω	178	British Library, Add MS 24379	London	UK	BL
ℓ 328	14th	†Gospels^{esk}	αω	126	British Library, Add MS 24380	London	UK	BL
ℓ 329	11th	†Gospels^{esk}	αω	115	British Library, Add MS 27860	London	UK	BL
ℓ 330	1185	†Gospels^{esk}	αω	306	British Library, Add MS 28817	London	UK	BL
ℓ 331	13th	†Gospels^{esk}	αω	118	British Library, Add MS 28818	London	UK	BL
ℓ 332	14th	†Gospels^{e}	αω	295	British Library, Add MS 29713	London	UK	BL
ℓ 333	13th	†Gospels^{e}	αω	272	British Library, Add MS 31208	London	UK	BL
ℓ 334	11th	Gospels^{P}	αω P^{U}	65	British Library, Add MS 31919	London	UK	BL
ℓ 335	11th	Gospels^{esk}	αω	226	British Library, Add MS 31920	London	UK	BL
ℓ 336	14th	†Gospels^{e}	αω	178	British Library, Add MS 31921	London	UK	BL
ℓ 337	12th	†Gospels^{esk}	αω	103	British Library, Add MS 31949	London	UK	BL
ℓ 338	10th	Gospels^{esk}	ΑΩ P^{U}	157	British Library, Burney MS 408	London	UK	BL
ℓ 339	13th	Gospels^{e}	αω	207	British Library, Egerton MS 2163	London	UK	BL
ℓ 340	13th	Gospels + Apostles^{Lit}	αω	276	British Library, Harley MS 5561	London	UK	BL
ℓ 341	11th	Gospels^{e}	αω	355	Bodleian Library, Auct. T. inf. 2. 7	Oxford	UK	INTF
ℓ 342	12th	Gospels^{e}	αω	216	Bodleian Library, Auct. T. inf. 2. 8	Oxford	UK	INTF
ℓ 343	13th	†Gospels^{esk}	αω	151	Keble College, 7	Oxford	UK	
ℓ 344	12th	†Gospels^{e}	αω	301	British Library, Add MS 39604	London	UK	BL
ℓ 345	12th	†Gospels^{esk}	αω	157	Duke University Libraries, Greek MS 093	Durham, NC	USA	DU
ℓ 346	14th	†Gospels^{esk}	αω	156	British Library, Egerton MS 2786	London	UK	BL
ℓ 347	14th	Gospels^{P}	αω P^{O}	6	Austrian National Library, Theol. gr. 160, fol. 1-4.214. 215	Vienna	Austria	
ℓ 348	14th	Apostles^{Lit}	αω	173	Russian National Library, Gr. 226	Saint Petersburg	Russia	
[ℓ 349] = 0237								
ℓ 350	15th	Gospels^{P}	αω	44	Interuniversity Library, H. 405, fol. 1-44	Montpellier	France	
ℓ 351	12th	Gospels^{e}	αω	313	Metropolitan Museum of Art, Acc. no. 2007.286	New York, NY	USA	Met
ℓ 352	8th	John 2:18-22, 3:22-29, 5:46-47, 6:1-2, 6:14-22	ΑΩ	2	National Library, Supplément Grec 1155, IV, fol. 5-6	Paris	France	BnF, INTF
ℓ 353	9th	John 16:24-33, 17:1-4, 18:2-26, 30-40	ΑΩ	4	National Library, Supplément Grec 1155, V, fol. 7-10	Paris	France	BnF, INTF
ℓ 354	8th	Matthew 14:22-34, 15:32-39, 17:14-15, 24-27, 18:1-11, 18:18-22, 19:1-2, 19:13-15, 20:1-28, 21:12-32, 43-46, 22:23-33	ΑΩ	8	National Library, Supplément Grec 1155, VI, fol. 11, 18	Paris	France	BnF, INTF
[ℓ 355] =0303								
ℓ 356	10th	Matthew 7:12-14, 13:45-50, 24:42-47; Mark 7:24-27; Luke 6:21-23	ΑΩ	2	National Library, Supplément Grec 1155, VIII, fol. 20, 21	Paris	France	BnF, INTF
ℓ 357	10th	Matthew 3:11, 14^{K}, 11:12-15, 27-30, 20:1-4; Mark 1:14-15; Luke 2:23-36, 3:19-20	ΑΩ	2	National Library, Supplément Grec 1155, IX, fol. 22, 23; Supplement Grec 686, fol. 34-36	Paris	France	BnF, INTF
ℓ 358	10th	Gospels^{P}	ΑΩ	6	National Library, Supplement Grec 1155, X, fol. 24-29	Paris	France	BnF, INTF
ℓ 358	10th	Gospels^{P}	ΑΩ	2	Vatopedi monastery, 1219, fol. 59, 60	Athos	Greece	
ℓ 359	10th	Mark 1:41-44, 3:4-5, 8:27-28, 9:24-31	ΑΩ	2	National Library, Supplement Grec 1155, XI, fol. 30.31	Paris	France	BnF, INTF
ℓ 360	8th	Matthew 17:1-4; Luke 9:28-36; John 10:23-30	ΑΩ	2	National Library, Supplement Grec 1155, XII, fol. 32.33	Paris	France	BnF, INTF
ℓ 361	12th	†Gospels^{e}	αω	236	National Library, Grec 256	Paris	France	INTF
ℓ 362	9th	†Gospels^{esk}	ΑΩ P^{U}	240	National Library, Grec 928	Paris	France	BnF
ℓ 363	10th	Gospels^{P}	ΑΩ P^{U}	55	National Library, Grec 975 B, fol. 1-114	Paris	France	BnF
ℓ 364	12th	Gospels^{e}	αω	339	National Library, Supplement Grec 24	Paris	France	INTF
ℓ 365	12th	†Gospels^{esk}	αω	198	National Library, Supplement Grec 29	Paris	France	BnF
ℓ 366	12th	Gospels^{P}	αω	72	National Library, Supplement Grec 74	Paris	France	BnF
ℓ 367	11th	Gospels^{sk}	ΑΩ	173	National Library, Supplement Grec 567	Paris	France	
[ℓ 368] = 0306								
ℓ 369	12th	†Gospels^{esk}	αω	111	National Library, Supplement Grec 758	Paris	France	BnF
ℓ 370	9th	Gospels^{P}	ΑΩ P^{U}	7	National Library, Supplement Grec 1092, fol. 12-18	Paris	France	BnF
ℓ 371	13th	†Gospels^{e}	αω	90	National Library, Supplement Grec 834	Paris	France	BnF
ℓ 372	1055	†Gospels^{esk}	αω	255	National Library, Supplement Grec 905	Paris	France	BnF
ℓ 373	10th	Gospels^{esk}	ΑΩ	253	National Library, Supplement Grec 1081	Paris	France	BnF
ℓ 374	11th	Gospels^{e}	αω	329	National Library, Supplement Grec 1096	Paris	France	BnF
ℓ 375	12th	†Gospels^{e}	αω	272	Jagiellonian Library, Graec. fol. 51	Kraków	Poland	INTF
ℓ 376	12th	Gospels^{e}	αω	223	Jagiellonian Library, Graec. fol. 52	Kraków	Poland	
ℓ 377	11th/12th	Gospels^{esk}	αω	248	Jagiellonian Library, Graec. fol. 53?	Kraków	Poland	
ℓ 378	12th	Gospels^{P}	αω	46	Jagiellonian Library, Graec. qu. 44	Kraków	Poland	
ℓ 379	12th	†Gospels?	αω	177	Berlin State Library, Gr. qu. 61	Berlin	Germany	INTF
ℓ 380	12th	†Gospels^{esk}	αω	135	Jagiellonian Library, Graec. qu. 64	Kraków	Poland	
ℓ 381	11th	Gospels^{e}	αω	378	Morgan Library & Museum, MS M.639	New York, NY	USA	INTF
ℓ 382	13th	Gospels^{e}	αω	394	Berlin State Library, Ham. 246	Berlin	Germany	
ℓ 383	12th	†Gospels^{esk}	αω	327	National Library, 163	Athens	Greece	CSNTM
ℓ 384	12th	Gospels^{e}	αω	292	National Library, 164	Athens	Greece	CSNTM
ℓ 385	12th	†Gospels^{esk}	αω	162	National Library, 165	Athens	Greece	CSNTM
ℓ 386	12th	†Gospels^{e}	αω	286	National Library, 166	Athens	Greece	CSNTM
ℓ 387	11th	†Gospels^{e}	αω	243	National Library, 167	Athens	Greece	CSNTM
ℓ 388	1527	†Gospels^{esk}	αω	217	National Library, 168	Athens	Greece	CSNTM
ℓ 389	11th	†Gospels^{esk}	αω	211	National Library, 169	Athens	Greece	CSNTM
ℓ 390	10th/11th	†Gospels^{esk}	αω	144	National Library, 170	Athens	Greece	CSNTM
ℓ 391	16th	†Gospels^{e}	αω	358	National Library, 171	Athens	Greece	CSNTM
ℓ 392	12th	†Gospels^{esk}	αω	212	National Library, 172	Athens	Greece	CSNTM
ℓ 393	12th	†Gospels^{esk}	αω	248	National Library, 173	Athens	Greece	CSNTM
ℓ 394	12th	†Gospels^{esk}	αω	256	National Library, 174	Athens	Greece	CSNTM
ℓ 395	14th	†Gospels^{esk}	αω	172	National Library, 175	Athens	Greece	CSNTM
ℓ 396	14th	†Gospels^{e}	αω	223	National Library, 176	Athens	Greece	CSNTM
ℓ 397	10th	Gospels^{P}	ΑΩ^{U}	79	National Library, 177	Athens	Greece	CSNTM
ℓ 398	14th	Gospels^{sel}	αω^{O}	78	National Library, 177	Athens	Greece	CSNTM
ℓ 399	13th	Gospels^{P}	αω	53	National Library, 178, ff. 1–6, 132–178	Athens	Greece	CSNTM
ℓ 400	14th	Gospels^{esk}	αω	125	National Library, 178, ff. 7–131	Athens	Greece	CSNTM

[top]

=== Lectionaries 401–500 ===
#	Date	Contents	Script	Pages	Institution	City, State	Country	Images
ℓ 401	1048	†Gospels^{esk}	αω	266	National Library, 179	Athens	Greece	CSNTM
ℓ 401	1048	†Gospels^{esk}	αω	266	National Library, 179	Athens	Greece	CSNTM
ℓ 402	1089	†Gospels^{e}	αω	204	National Library, 180	Athens	Greece	CSNTM
ℓ 402	1089	†Gospels^{e}	αω	204	National Library, 180	Athens	Greece	CSNTM
ℓ 403	14th	†Gospels^{esk}	αω	257	National Library, 181	Athens	Greece	INTF
ℓ 404	12th	†Gospels^{(e)sk}	αω	156	National Library, 182	Athens	Greece	CSNTM
ℓ 405	1274	†Gospels^{e}	αω	151	National Library, 183	Athens	Greece	CSNTM
ℓ 405	1274	†Gospels^{e}	αω	151	National Library, 183	Athens	Greece	CSNTM
ℓ 406	14th	†Gospels^{e}	αω	242	National Library, 184	Athens	Greece	CSNTM
ℓ 407	13th	†Gospels^{esk}	αω	261	National Library, 185	Athens	Greece	CSNTM
ℓ 407	13th	†Gospels^{esk}	αω	3	University of Birmingham Cadbury Research Library, Mingana Gr. 2	Birmingham	United Kingdom	UB
ℓ 408	12th	†Gospels^{e}	αω	171	National Library, 186	Athens	Greece	CSNTM
ℓ 409	11th	†Gospels^{esk}	αω	271	National Library, 187	Athens	Greece	CSNTM
ℓ 409	11th	†Gospels^{esk}	αω	271	National Library, 187	Athens	Greece	CSNTM
ℓ 410	13th	Gospels^{esk}	αω	301	National Library, 188	Athens	Greece	CSNTM
ℓ 411	12th	†Gospels^{e}	αω	156	National Library, 189	Athens	Greece	CSNTM
ℓ 412	12th	†Gospels^{esk}	αω	250	National Library, 190	Athens	Greece	CSNTM
ℓ 413	14th	Gospels^{e}	αω	159	National Library, 191	Athens	Greece	CSNTM
ℓ 414	14th	Gospels^{esk}	αω^{O}	240	National Library, 192	Athens	Greece	CSNTM
ℓ 415	14th	†Gospels^{esk}	αω	216	National Library, 193, ff. 1–214	Athens	Greece	CSNTM
ℓ 416	1452	Gospels^{e}	αω	394	National Library, 194	Athens	Greece	CSNTM
ℓ 417	1536	Gospels^{esk}	αω	381	National Library, 195	Athens	Greece	CSNTM
ℓ 418	15th	Gospels^{esk}	αω	206	National Library, 196	Athens	Greece	CSNTM
ℓ 419	16th	Gospels^{esk}	αω	341	National Library, 197	Athens	Greece	CSNTM
ℓ 420	15th	†Gospels^{esk}	αω	322	National Library, 198	Athens	Greece	CSNTM
ℓ 421	12th	Gospels + Apostles^{esk}	αω	293	National Library, 199	Athens	Greece	CSNTM
ℓ 422	14th	Gospels + Apostles^{e}	αω	339	National Library, 200	Athens	Greece	CSNTM
ℓ 423	1732	Gospels + Apostles^{P}	αω	32	National Library, 201	Athens	Greece	CSNTM
ℓ 424	12th	Gospels^{P}	αω	2	National Library, 202, p. 1-4	Athens	Greece	
ℓ 425	9th-10th	†Gospels^{esk}	ΑΩ	273	National Library, 59	Athens	Greece	CSNTM
ℓ 426	15th	Gospels + Apostles^{P}	αω	100	National Library, 685, pp. 194–392	Athens	Greece	CSNTM
ℓ 426	15th	Gospels + Apostles^{P}	αω	100	National Library, 685, pp. 194–392	Athens	Greece	CSNTM
ℓ 427	13th	†Gospels + Apostles^{e}	αω	348	National Library, 133	Athens	Greece	CSNTM
ℓ 428	12th	†Gospels^{esk}	αω	296	National Library, 63	Athens	Greece	CSNTM
ℓ 429	12th	†Gospels^{esk}	αω	197	National Library, 66	Athens	Greece	CSNTM
ℓ 430	12th	Gospels^{e}	αω	199	National Library, 70	Athens	Greece	CSNTM
ℓ 431	15th	Gospels^{e}	αω	324	National Library, 83	Athens	Greece	CSNTM
ℓ 432	12th	†Gospels^{esk}	αω	287	National Library, 64	Athens	Greece	CSNTM
ℓ 433	12th	†Gospels^{esk}	αω	139	National Library, 82	Athens	Greece	CSNTM
ℓ 434	12th	†Gospels^{esk}	αω	220	National Library, 68	Athens	Greece	CSNTM
ℓ 435	14th	Gospels^{esk}	αω	192	National Library, 79	Athens	Greece	CSNTM
ℓ 435	14th	Gospels^{esk}	αω	192	National Library, 79	Athens	Greece	CSNTM
ℓ 436	1545	†Gospels^{e}	αω	314	National Library, 73	Athens	Greece	CSNTM
ℓ 437	12th	†Gospels^{e}	αω	260	National Library, 67	Athens	Greece	CSNTM
ℓ 438	13th	†Gospels^{sk}	αω	119	National Library, 112	Athens	Greece	CSNTM
ℓ 439	14th	Gospels + Apostles^{Lit}	αω	138	National Library, 661	Athens	Greece	CSNTM
ℓ 440	1504	Gospels + Apostles^{esk}	αω	276	National Library, 126	Athens	Greece	CSNTM
ℓ 441	11th	Gospels^{esk}	αω	200	National Library, 69	Athens	Greece	CSNTM
ℓ 442	12th	†Gospels^{esk}	αω	314	National Library, 61	Athens	Greece	CSNTM
ℓ 443	12th	Gospels + Apostles^{Lit}	αω	252	National Library, 840	Athens	Greece	CSNTM
ℓ 443	12th	Gospels + Apostles^{Lit}	αω	252	National Library, 840	Athens	Greece	CSNTM
ℓ 444	10th	Gospels^{P}	ΑΩ^{U}	133	National Library, 347	Athens	Greece	CSNTM
ℓ 445	14th	†Gospels^{esk}	αω	146	National Library, 84	Athens	Greece	CSNTM
ℓ 446	14th	†Gospels + Apostles^{Lit}	αω	178	National Library, 713	Athens	Greece	CSNTM
ℓ 447	12th	†Gospels^{e}	αω	102	National Library, 85	Athens	Greece	CSNTM
ℓ 448	13th	†Gospels^{esk}	αω	169	National Library, 124	Athens	Greece	CSNTM
ℓ 449	12th	Gospels^{esk}	αω	329	National Library, 62	Athens	Greece	CSNTM
ℓ 450	12th	Gospels^{esk}	αω	478	Hellenic Parliament Library, 7	Athens	Greece	CSNTM
ℓ 451	1052	Gospels^{esk}	αω	242	Duke University, Greek MS 085	Durham, NC	USA	DU
ℓ 452	12th	Gospels^{P}	αω	30?	Owner Unknown			
ℓ 453	11th	Gospels^{esk}	αω	?	Owner Unknown			
ℓ 454	9th	Gospels^{P}	ΑΩ	2	Trinity College Dublin, IE TCD MS 31 fol. IV (fol. 1-237)	Dublin	Ireland	TCD
ℓ 455	10th	†Gospels^{esk}	αω	182	Toledo Cathedral, CT. B. 31-31, p. 53-415	Toledo	Spain	
ℓ 456	13th	Gospels^{esk}	αω	?	Owner Unknown			
ℓ 457	14th	†Gospels^{esk}	αω	?	Owner Unknown			
ℓ 458	15th	†Gospels^{e}	αω	?	Owner Unknown			
[ℓ 459]								
[ℓ 460]								
[ℓ 461]								
ℓ 462	17th	Gospels^{e}	αω	463	Byzantine and Christian Museum, 11	Athens	Greece	
ℓ 463	12th	Gospels^{P}	αω	41	Exarchist Monastery of Saint Mary, A. a. 7	Grottaferrata	Italy	
ℓ 463	12th	Gospels^{P}	αω	4	Vatican Library, Vat. gr. 2112, fol. 72-75	Vatican City	Vatican	
ℓ 464	12th	†Gospels^{e}	αω	292	Exarchist Monastery of Saint Mary, A. a. 9	Grottaferrata	Italy	
ℓ 465	11th	Gospels^{esk}	αω	246	Exarchist Monastery of Saint Mary, A. a. 10	Grottaferrata	Italy	
ℓ 466	13th	Gospels^{(e)sk}	αω P^{O}	255?	Exarchist Monastery of Saint Mary, A. a. 11; A. α. 13	Grottaferrata	Italy	
ℓ 467	10th	Gospels^{P}	αω	97	Exarchist Monastery of Saint Mary, A. a. 12	Grottaferrata	Italy	
[ℓ 468]								
ℓ 469	12th	Gospels^{P}	αω	73	Exarchist Monastery of Saint Mary, A. a. 14	Grottaferrata	Italy	
ℓ 470	11th	Gospels^{P}	αω	69	Exarchist Monastery of Saint Mary, A. a. 15	Grottaferrata	Italy	
ℓ 471	11th	Gospels^{P}	αω	55	Exarchist Monastery of Saint Mary, A. a. 16	Grottaferrata	Italy	
ℓ 472	11th	Gospels^{P}	αω	2	Exarchist Monastery of Saint Mary, Z. d. 120, fol. 18. 19	Grottaferrata	Italy	
ℓ 473	10th	Gospels + Apostles^{Lit}	αω	155	Exarchist Monastery of Saint Mary, A. d. 2	Grottaferrata	Italy	
ℓ 474	12th	Gospels^{esk}	αω	165	Auckland City Libraries, Med G123	Auckland	New Zealand	CSNTM
ℓ 475	13th	Gospels + Apostles^{Lit}	αω P^{O}	257	Exarchist Monastery of Saint Mary, A. d. 4	Grottaferrata	Italy	
ℓ 476	15th	Gospels + Apostles^{Lit}	αω	341	University of Michigan, MS 67	Ann Arbor, MI	USA	CSNTM
ℓ 477	11th/12th	Gospels + Apostles^{sel}	αω	109	Lambeth Palace, MS1194	London	UK	LP
ℓ 478	11th	Gospels + Apostles^{Lit}	αω	55	Exarchist Monastery of Saint Mary, A. b. 2, fol. 159-213	Grottaferrata	Italy	
ℓ 479	12th	†Gospels + Apostles^{esk}	αω	87	Austrian National Library, Theol. gr. 308	Vienna	Austria	CSNTM
ℓ 480	10th/11th	†Gospels^{esk}	αω P^{U}	166	Exarchist Monastery of Saint Mary, E. a. 1	Grottaferrata	Italy	
ℓ 481	10th	Gospels^{P}	αω P^{U}	24	Exarchist Monastery of Saint Mary, E. a. 1	Grottaferrata	Italy	
ℓ 482	10th	Gospels^{P}	ΑΩ P^{U}	38	Exarchist Monastery of Saint Mary, B. b. 10	Grottaferrata	Italy	
ℓ 483	10th	Gospels^{P}	αω P^{U}	21	Exarchist Monastery of Saint Mary, D. d. 6	Grottaferrata	Italy	
ℓ 484	10th	Gospels^{P}	αω P^{U}	1	Exarchist Monastery of Saint Mary, G. g. 3	Grottaferrata	Italy	
ℓ 485	10th	Gospels^{P}	αω P^{U}	54	Exarchist Monastery of Saint Mary, B. a. 5	Grottaferrata	Italy	
ℓ 486	12th/13th	Gospels^{P}	αω	1	Exarchist Monastery of Saint Mary, Z. a. 2	Grottaferrata	Italy	
ℓ 487	17th	Gospels^{P-Lit}	αω	170	Exarchist Monastery of Saint Mary, G. a. 18	Grottaferrata	Italy	
ℓ 488	11th	Gospels + Apostles^{Lit}	αω	151	Exarchist Monastery of Saint Mary, G. b. 2	Grottaferrata	Italy	
ℓ 489	13th	Gospels + Apostles^{Lit}	αω	101	Exarchist Monastery of Saint Mary, G. b. 6	Grottaferrata	Italy	
ℓ 490	9th	Gospels^{P-Lit}	αω	192	Exarchist Monastery of Saint Mary, G. b. 7	Grottaferrata	Italy	
ℓ 491	13th	Gospels^{P-Lit}	αω P^{O}	6	Exarchist Monastery of Saint Mary, G. b. 8	Grottaferrata	Italy	
ℓ 492	16th	Gospels + Apostles^{Lit}	αω	94	Exarchist Monastery of Saint Mary, G. b. 9	Grottaferrata	Italy	
ℓ 493	12th	Gospels^{Lit}	αω	20	Exarchist Monastery of Saint Mary, G. b. 11	Grottaferrata	Italy	
ℓ 494	13th	Gospels + Apostles^{Lit}	αω P^{O}	98	Exarchist Monastery of Saint Mary, G. b. 12	Grottaferrata	Italy	
ℓ 495	13th	Gospels + Apostles^{Lit}	αω	188	Exarchist Monastery of Saint Mary, G. b. 13	Grottaferrata	Italy	
ℓ 496	13th	Gospels^{Lit}	αω P^{O}	54	Exarchist Monastery of Saint Mary, G. b. 14	Grottaferrata	Italy	
ℓ 497	12th	Gospels + Apostles^{Lit}	αω	42	Exarchist Monastery of Saint Mary, G. b. 15	Grottaferrata	Italy	
ℓ 498	16th	Gospels + Apostles^{Lit}	αω	269	Exarchist Monastery of Saint Mary, G. b. 17	Grottaferrata	Italy	
ℓ 499	13th	Luke 24:12-35; John 1:35-39	αω	2	National Library, Supplément Grec 687, fol. 11, 15	Paris	France	BnF, INTF
ℓ 500	16th	†Apostles^{e}	αω	143	Exarchist Monastery of Saint Mary, G. b. 17	Grottaferrata	Italy	

[top]

=== Lectionaries 501–600 ===
#	Date	Contents	Script	Pages	Institution	City, State	Country	Images
ℓ 501	1641	Gospels + Apostles^{Lit}	αω	76	Exarchist Monastery of Saint Mary, G. b. 23	Grottaferrata	Italy	
ℓ 502	16th	Gospels + Apostles^{sk}	αω	114	Exarchist Monastery of Saint Mary, G. b. 24	Grottaferrata	Italy	
ℓ 503	13th	Gospels^{Lit}	αω	83	Exarchist Monastery of Saint Mary, G. b. 35	Grottaferrata	Italy	
ℓ 504	17th	†Gospels + Apostles^{k}	αω	91	Exarchist Monastery of Saint Mary, G. b. 38	Grottaferrata	Italy	
ℓ 505	16th	Gospels + Apostles^{Lit}	αω	335	Exarchist Monastery of Saint Mary, G. b. 42	Grottaferrata	Italy	
ℓ 506	18th	Gospels + Apostles^{Lit}	αω	77	Exarchist Monastery of Saint Mary, D. b. 22	Grottaferrata	Italy	
ℓ 507	14th	Gospels^{Lit}	αω P^{O}	115	Exarchist Monastery of Saint Mary, D. g. 7	Grottaferrata	Italy	
ℓ 508	18th	Gospels^{Lit-P}	αω	103	Exarchist Monastery of Saint Mary, D. g. 26	Grottaferrata	Italy	
ℓ 509	11th	Gospels^{P}	αω	14	Exarchist Monastery of Saint Mary, D. d. 6, 3	Grottaferrata	Italy	
ℓ 510	12th	†Gospels^{esk}	αω	131	Laurentian Library, Gadd. rel 124	Florence	Italy	CSNTM
ℓ 511	9th	Gospels^{P}	ΑΩ P^{U}	1	Riccardian Library, 69, fol. 110	Florence	Italy	
ℓ 512	15th	†Gospels^{esk}	αω	236	University of Messina, 58	Messina	Italy	
ℓ 513	12th	Gospels^{e}	αω	318	University of Messina, 65	Messina	Italy	
ℓ 514	10th	Gospels^{e}	ΑΩ	266	University of Messina, 66	Messina	Italy	
ℓ 515	12th	Gospels^{e}	αω	223	University of Messina, 73	Messina	Italy	
ℓ 516	13th	†Gospels^{esk}	αω	136	University of Messina, 75	Messina	Italy	
ℓ 517	12th	†Gospels^{esk}	αω	184	University of Messina, 94	Messina	Italy	
ℓ 518	13th	†Gospels^{esk}	αω	186	University of Messina, 95	Messina	Italy	
ℓ 519	12th	Gospels^{e}	αω	298	University of Messina, 96	Messina	Italy	INTF
ℓ 520	1184	Gospels^{e}	αω	285	University of Messina, 98	Messina	Italy	
ℓ 521	12th	Gospels^{esk}	αω P^{O}	119	University of Messina, 111	Messina	Italy	
ℓ 522	12th	†Gospels^{esk}	αω	146	University of Messina, 112	Messina	Italy	
ℓ 523	12th	Gospels + Apostles^{P}	αω	60	University of Messina, 150	Messina	Italy	
ℓ 524	12th	†Gospels^{esk}	αω	189	University of Messina, 170	Messina	Italy	
ℓ 525	8th	Gospels^{P}	ΑΩ	2	University of Messina, 175. II	Messina	Italy	
ℓ 526	10th	Gospels^{P}	ΑΩ	12	Fabroniana Library, 311	Pistoia	Italy	
ℓ 527	10th	Gospels^{P}	ΑΩ	3	Angelica Library, 106, fol. 4-6	Rome	Italy	
ℓ 528	15th	Gospels + Apostles^{Lit}	αω	254	Vatican Library, Barb. gr. 303	Vatican City	Vatican City	
ℓ 529	15th	Gospels + Apostles^{Lit}	αω	188	Vatican Library, Barb. gr. 410	Vatican City	Vatican City	
ℓ 530	15th	Gospels + Apostles^{Lit}	αω	386	Vatican Library, Barb. gr. 419	Vatican City	Vatican City	
ℓ 531	11th	Gospels^{Lit}	αω	145	Vatican Library, Barb. gr. 431	Vatican City	Vatican City	
ℓ 532	11th	Gospels + Apostles^{Lit}	αω	159	Vatican Library, Barb. gr. 443	Vatican City	Vatican City	
ℓ 533	12th	Gospels + Apostles^{Lit}	αω	206	Vatican Library, Barb. gr. 446	Vatican City	Vatican City	
ℓ 534	12th	Gospels^{esk}	αω	223	Vatican Library, Barb. gr. 448	Vatican City	Vatican City	INTF
ℓ 535	13th	Gospels^{esk}	αω	221	Vatican Library, Barb. gr. 461	Vatican City	Vatican City	DVL
ℓ 536	11th	Gospels^{esk}	αω	161	Vatican Library, Barb. gr. 471	Vatican City	Vatican City	
ℓ 537	12th	†Gospels^{e}	αω	248	Vatican Library, Barb. gr. 579	Vatican City	Vatican City	
ℓ 538	10th	Gospels^{sel}	ΑΩ	227	Vatican Library, Chis. R VII 52 (gr. 43)	Vatican City	Vatican City	
ℓ 539	11th	Gospels^{e}	αω	314	Vatican Library, Vat. gr. 350	Vatican City	Vatican City	DVL
ℓ 540	13th	Gospels^{esk}	αω	244	Vatican Library, Vat. gr. 352	Vatican City	Vatican City	DVL
ℓ 541	10th	†Gospels^{esk}	ΑΩ	237	Vatican Library, Vat. gr. 353	Vatican City	Vatican City	DVL
ℓ 542	10th	Gospels^{esk}	ΑΩ	315	Vatican Library, Vat. gr. 355	Vatican City	Vatican City	DVL
ℓ 543	10th	Gospels^{esk}	ΑΩ	322	Vatican Library, Vat. gr. 357	Vatican City	Vatican City	DVL
ℓ 544	11th	†Gospels^{esk}	αω	200	Vatican Library, Vat. gr. 362	Vatican City	Vatican City	DVL
ℓ 545	10th	Gospels^{P}	ΑΩ	4	Vatican Library, Vat. gr. 540, fol. 1. 2. 195. 196	Vatican City	Vatican City	INTF
ℓ 546	10th	Gospels^{esk}	αω	152	Vatican Library, Vat. gr. 781	Vatican City	Vatican City	
ℓ 547	13th	†Gospels^{esk}	αω	151	Vatican Library, Vat. gr. 1217	Vatican City	Vatican City	INTF
ℓ 548	14th	Gospels + Apostles^{Lit-P}	αω	34	Vatican Library, Vat. gr. 1228	Vatican City	Vatican City	DVL
ℓ 549	13th	Gospels^{esk}	αω	223	Vatican Library, Vat. gr. 1523	Vatican City	Vatican City	DVL
ℓ 550	12th	Gospels^{esk}	αω	192	Vatican Library, Vat. gr. 1601	Vatican City	Vatican City	INTF
ℓ 551	13th	Gospels^{e}	αω	361	Vatican Library, Vat. gr. 1625	Vatican City	Vatican City	INTF
ℓ 552	13th	Gospels^{Lit-P}	αω	266	Vatican Library, Vat. gr. 1813	Vatican City	Vatican City	DVL
ℓ 553	13th	†Gospels^{e}	αω	110	Vatican Library, Vat. gr. 1886	Vatican City	Vatican City	
ℓ 554	1373	Gospels + Apostles^{Sel}	αω P^{O}	34	Vatican Library, Vat. gr. 1973, fol. 24-57	Vatican City	Vatican City	DVL
ℓ 555	15th	Gospels + Apostles^{Lit-P}	αω	115	Vatican Library, Vat. gr. 1978	Vatican City	Vatican City	
ℓ 556	15th	Gospels + Apostles^{Lit}	αω	211	Vatican Library, Vat. gr. 2012	Vatican City	Vatican City	
ℓ 557	15th	Gospels + Apostles^{Lit}	αω	128	Vatican Library, Vat. gr. 2051	Vatican City	Vatican City	
ℓ 558	1561	Gospels + Apostles^{Lit}	αω	207	Vatican Library, Vat. gr. 2052	Vatican City	Vatican City	INTF
ℓ 559	8th	Gospels^{P}	ΑΩ P^{U}	7	Vatican Library, Vat. gr. 2061, fol. 164. 169. 174. 175. 209. 214. 227	Vatican City	Vatican City	DVL
ℓ 560	14th	†Gospels^{P-K}	αω P^{O}	79	Vatican Library, Vat. gr. 2100	Vatican City	Vatican City	
ℓ 561	16th	Gospels^{P}	αω	5	Vatican Library, Vat. gr. 2129, p. 1-10 (p. 17-158: 2064)	Vatican City	Vatican City	DVL
ℓ 562	991	Gospels^{P}	αω	91	Vatican Library, Vat. gr. 2138	Vatican City	Vatican City	DVL
ℓ 563	9th	Gospels^{esk}	ΑΩ	306	Vatican Library, Vat. gr. 2144	Vatican City	Vatican City	INTF
ℓ 564	14th	Gospels^{e}	αω	361	Vatican Library, Vat. gr. 2167	Vatican City	Vatican City	
ℓ 565	10th	Gospels^{P}	ΑΩ	4	Vatican Library, Vat. gr. 2251, fol. I.II.273.274	Vatican City	Vatican City	INTF
ℓ 566	11th	Gospels^{P}	ΑΩ	2	Vatican Library, Ottob. gr. 444, fol. A. B	Vatican City	Vatican City	INTF
ℓ 567	9th	Gospels^{P}	ΑΩ	2	Vatican Library, Pal. gr. 1	Vatican City	Vatican City	INTF
ℓ 568	15th	Gospels^{k-K}	αω	397	Vatican Library, Pal. gr. 221	Vatican City	Vatican City	
ℓ 569	16th	Gospels^{k-K}	αω	192	Vatican Library, Pal. gr. 239	Vatican City	Vatican City	
ℓ 570	10th	†Gospels^{esk}	αω	158	Vatican Library, Reg. gr. Pii II 33	Vatican City	Vatican City	INTF
ℓ 571	17th	Gospels^{K}	αω	356	Vatican Library, Reg. gr. 44	Vatican City	Vatican City	
ℓ 572	14th	Gospels + Apostles^{Lit}	αω	337	Vatican Library, Reg. gr. 49	Vatican City	Vatican City	
ℓ 573	12th	Gospels + Apostles^{Lit}	αω	137	Vatican Library, Reg. gr. 59	Vatican City	Vatican City	INTF
ℓ 574	1125	Gospels^{e}	αω	226	Alagoniana Library, 3	Syracuse	Italy	INTF
ℓ 575	15th	Gospels + Apostles^{Lit}	αω	218	Alagoniana Library, 4	Syracuse	Italy	
ℓ 576	12th	Gospels^{esk}	αω	205	San Lazzaro Library, 1612	Venice	Italy	
ℓ 577	17th	Gospels^{Lit-P}	αω	211	Dionysiou Monastery, 378	Mount Athos	Greece	
ℓ 578	11th	Gospels^{e}	αω	252	University Library, Ms. 222 (D Laing 9)	Edinburgh	United Kingdom	CSNTM
ℓ 579	13th	Gospels^{e(sk)}	αω	230	Aristotle University, Ms. 81	Thessaloniki	Greece	CSNTM
ℓ 580	9th	†Gospels^{esk}	αω	103	Formerly, Skete of St. Andrew (destroyed)	Athos	Greece	
ℓ 581	16th	Gospels^{e}	αω	?	Formerly, Skete of St. Andrew (destroyed)	Athos	Greece	
ℓ 582	14th	†Gospels^{esk}	αω	125	Formerly, Skete of St. Andrew (destroyed)	Athos	Greece	
ℓ 583	13th	Apostles^{esk}	αω	141	Library of Study and Conservation, Ms. 42	Besançon	France	
ℓ 584	14th	†Apostles^{esk}	αω	115	National Library, Supplement Grec 800	Paris	France	BnF
ℓ 585	15th	Apostles^{e}	αω	180	Estense Library, G. 102, a.T.8.7 (II D 3)	Modena	Italy	
ℓ 586	10th	Apostles^{P}	ΑΩ P^{U}	17	University of Birmingham Cadbury Research Library, Cod. Peckov. Gr. 7, fol. 1-3, 352-365	Birmingham	United Kingdom	
ℓ 587	12th	Apostles^{e}	αω	218	National Library of Greece, 205	Athens	Greece	CSNTM
ℓ 588	1485	Apostles^{e}	αω	347	National Library of Greece, 206	Athens	Greece	CSNTM
ℓ 589	15th	Apostles^{e}	αω	217	National Library of Greece, 90	Athens	Greece	CSNTM
ℓ 590	11th	†Apostles^{e}	αω	169	National Library of Greece, 101	Athens	Greece	CSNTM
ℓ 590	11th	†Apostles^{e}	αω	169	National Library of Greece, 101	Athens	Greece	CSNTM
ℓ 591	11th	†Apostles^{e}	αω	243	National Library of Greece, 106	Athens	Greece	CSNTM
ℓ 592	1576	†Apostles^{e}	αω	187	National Library of Greece, 115	Athens	Greece	CSNTM
ℓ 593	15th	Apostles^{e}	αω	229	National Library of Greece, 102	Athens	Greece	CSNTM
ℓ 594	15th	Apostles^{esk}	αω	190	National Library of Greece, 114	Athens	Greece	CSNTM
ℓ 595	15th	†Apostles^{esk}	αω	64	Royal Site of San Lorenzo de El Escorial, W. IV. 22, fol. 1-64	San Lorenzo de El Escorial	Spain	
ℓ 596	1146	Apostles^{sel}	αω	136	Royal Site of San Lorenzo de El Escorial, Y. III. 9	San Lorenzo de El Escorial	Spain	
ℓ 597	10th	Apostles^{esk}	αω	140	Exarchist Monastery of Saint Mary, A. b. 4	Grottaferrata	Italy	
ℓ 598	11th	Apostles^{esk}	αω	245	Exarchist Monastery of Saint Mary, A. b. 5	Grottaferrata	Italy	CSNTM
ℓ 599	11th	†Apostles^{esk}	αω	64	Exarchist Monastery of Saint Mary, A. b. 7	Grottaferrata	Italy	CSNTM
ℓ 600	14th	†Apostles^{esk}	αω	127	Exarchist Monastery of Saint Mary, A. b. 8	Grottaferrata	Italy	

[top]

=== Lectionaries 601–700 ===
#	Date	Contents	Script	Pages	Institution	City, State	Country	Images
ℓ 601	12th	†Apostles^{esk}	αω	104	Exarchist Monastery of Saint Mary, A. b. 9	Grottaferrata	Italy	
ℓ 602	13th	Apostles^{P}	αω	16	Exarchist Monastery of Saint Mary, Z. d. 118, fol. 90-105	Grottaferrata	Italy	
ℓ 603	11th	Apostles^{e}	αω	192	Exarchist Monastery of Saint Mary, A. b. 11	Grottaferrata	Italy	
ℓ 604	12th	†Apostles^{e}	αω	217	Laurentian Library, S. Marco 704	Florence	Italy	CSNTM
ℓ 605	13th	Apostles^{P}	αω	29	Ambrosiana Library, C. 16. inf.	Milan	Italy	
ℓ 606	12th	Apostles^{e}	αω P^{O}	331	University of Messina, 93	Messina	Italy	
ℓ 607	1556	†Apostles^{esk}	αω	158	Vatican Library, Barb. gr. 429	Vatican City	Vatican City	
ℓ 608	12th	†Apostles^{e}	αω	322	Vatican Library, Barb. gr. 478	Vatican City	Vatican City	DVL
ℓ 609	12th	†Apostles^{e}	αω	185	Vatican Library, Barb. gr. 502	Vatican City	Vatican City	
ℓ 610	15th	Apostles^{e}	αω	271	Saint Catherine's Monastery, Gr. 295	Sinai	Egypt	CSNTM
ℓ 611	13th	†Apostles^{esk}	αω	136	Vatican Library, Vat. gr. 368	Vatican City	Vatican City	DVL
ℓ 612	14th	Apostles^{e}	αω	226	Vatican Library, Vat. gr. 369	Vatican City	Vatican City	
ℓ 613	12th	†Apostles^{e}	αω	232	Vatican Library, Vat. gr. 2068	Vatican City	Vatican City	DVL
ℓ 614	13th	†Apostles^{esk}	αω	111	Vatican Library, Vat. gr. 2116	Vatican City	Vatican City	
ℓ 615	15th	Apostles^{esk}	αω	149	Vatican Library, Pal. gr. 241	Vatican City	Vatican City	
ℓ 616	12th	†Apostles^{e}	αω	168	Vatican Library, Reg. gr. 11	Vatican City	Vatican City	INTF
ℓ 617	11th	Apostles^{e}	αω	280	Marciana National Library, Gr. II,115 (1058), fol. 1-280	Venice	Italy	
ℓ 618	14th	†Apostles^{e}	αω	367	Marciana National Library, Gr. II,128 (1216)	Venice	Italy	
ℓ 619	16th	Apostles^{ek}	αω	121	Osiou Gregoriou Monastery, 60	Mount Athos	Greece	
ℓ 620	1542	Apostles^{e}	αω	343	Dionysiou Monastery, 386	Mount Athos	Greece	
ℓ 621	17th	†Apostles^{e}	αω	246	Dionysiou Monastery, 387	Mount Athos	Greece	
ℓ 622	16th	†Apostles^{e}	αω	305	Dionysiou Monastery, 392	Mount Athos	Greece	
ℓ 623	13th	†Apostles^{e}	αω	25	Russian Academy of Sciences Historical Institute, Dmitr. 13b	Saint Petersburg	Russia	
ℓ 623	13th	†Apostles^{e}	αω	18	Docheiariou Monastery, 17	Mount Athos	Greece	
ℓ 624	12th	†Apostles^{e}	αω	216	Docheiariou Monastery, 20	Mount Athos	Greece	
ℓ 625	12th	†Apostles^{e}	αω	239	Docheiariou Monastery, 27	Mount Athos	Greece	
ℓ 626	17th	†Apostles^{esk}	αω	275	Docheiariou Monastery, 141	Mount Athos	Greece	
ℓ 627	8th	Gospels^{esk}	ΑΩ	237	Dionysiou Monastery, 1	Mount Athos	Greece	INTF
ℓ 628	10th	Gospels^{esk}	αω	220	Dionysiou Monastery, 2	Mount Athos	Greece	INTF
ℓ 629	12th	†Gospels^{esk}	αω	146	Dionysiou Monastery, 3	Mount Athos	Greece	INTF
ℓ 630	13th	†Gospels^{esk}	αω	110	Dionysiou Monastery, 6	Mount Athos	Greece	INTF
ℓ 631	12th	†Gospels^{esk}	αω	152	Dionysiou Monastery, 11	Mount Athos	Greece	INTF
ℓ 632	13th	Gospels^{e}	αω	382	Dionysiou Monastery, 13	Mount Athos	Greece	INTF
ℓ 633	11th	†Gospels^{e}	αω	237	Dionysiou Monastery, 14	Mount Athos	Greece	INTF
ℓ 634	12th	†Gospels^{e}	αω	314	Dionysiou Monastery, 15	Mount Athos	Greece	INTF
ℓ 635	12th	Gospels^{e}	αω	323	Dionysiou Monastery, 16	Mount Athos	Greece	INTF
ℓ 636	12th	Gospels^{e}	αω	315	Dionysiou Monastery, 17	Mount Athos	Greece	INTF
ℓ 637	12th	Gospels^{P}	αω	98	Dionysiou Monastery, 18	Mount Athos	Greece	INTF
ℓ 638	11th	Gospels^{e}	αω	292	Dionysiou Monastery, 19	Mount Athos	Greece	INTF
ℓ 639	12th	Gospels^{e}	αω	300	Dionysiou Monastery, 20	Mount Athos	Greece	INTF
ℓ 640	9th	Gospels^{esk}	ΑΩ	258	Dionysiou Monastery, 21	Mount Athos	Greece	INTF
ℓ 641	12th	Gospels^{P}	αω	44	Dionysiou Monastery, 85	Mount Athos	Greece	INTF
ℓ 642	16th	Matthew 10:5-8, 14:1-13; Luke 10:16-17, 38-42, 11:27-28; John 19:25-26; Acts 13:31-32; 1 Corinthians 1:18-24; Philippians 2:5-11; Hebrews 2:7-10	αω	4	Dionysiou Monastery, 163, fol. A. 1-3	Mount Athos	Greece	INTF
ℓ 643	1655	Gospels^{e}	αω	334	Owner Unknown			
ℓ 644	1559	Gospels^{e}	αω	301	Dionysiou Monastery, 303	Mount Athos	Greece	INTF
ℓ 645	17th	Gospels^{e}	αω	371	Dionysiou Monastery, 304	Mount Athos	Greece	
ℓ 646	17th	Gospels^{e}	αω	244	Dionysiou Monastery, 305	Mount Athos	Greece	
ℓ 647	17th	Gospels^{e}	αω	347	Dionysiou Monastery, 306	Mount Athos	Greece	
ℓ 648	16th	Gospels^{esk}	αω	232	Duke University, Greek MS 028	Durham, NC	United States	
ℓ 649	15th	Gospels^{e}	αω	257	Dionysiou Monastery, 308	Mount Athos	Greece	
ℓ 650	1395	Gospels^{e}	αω	262	Dionysiou Monastery, 309	Mount Athos	Greece	
ℓ 651	12th	Gospels^{e}	αω	371	Docheiariou Monastery, 1	Mount Athos	Greece	
[ℓ 652]								
ℓ 653	1276	Gospels^{e}	αω	270	Docheiariou Monastery, 13, fol. 2-271	Mount Athos	Greece	
ℓ 653	1276	Gospels^{e}	αω	1	Russian National Library, Gr. 310	Saint Petersburg	Russia	
ℓ 654	12th	†Gospels^{e}	αω	279	Docheiariou Monastery, 14	Mount Athos	Greece	
ℓ 655	13th	Gospels^{e}	αω	241	Docheiariou Monastery, 15	Mount Athos	Greece	
ℓ 656	13th	†Gospels^{esk}	αω	206	Docheiariou Monastery, 19	Mount Athos	Greece	
ℓ 657	12th	Gospels^{esk}	αω	153	Docheiariou Monastery, 23	Mount Athos	Greece	
ℓ 658	11th	†Gospels^{esk}	αω	257	Docheiariou Monastery, 24	Mount Athos	Greece	
ℓ 659	11th	Gospels^{esk}	αω	246	Docheiariou Monastery, 36	Mount Athos	Greece	
[ℓ 660]								
ℓ 661	15th	†Gospels^{e}	αω	239	Docheiariou Monastery, 137	Mount Athos	Greece	
ℓ 662	11th	Gospels^{esk}	αω	205	Esphigmenou Monastery, 19	Mount Athos	Greece	
ℓ 663	11th	Gospels^{e}	αω	296	Esphigmenou Monastery, 20	Mount Athos	Greece	INTF
ℓ 664	12th	Gospels^{e}	αω	242	Esphigmenou Monastery, 21	Mount Athos	Greece	
ℓ 665	12th	Gospels^{e}	αω	220	Esphigmenou Monastery, 22	Mount Athos	Greece	
ℓ 666	11th	Gospels^{e}	αω	230	Esphigmenou Monastery, 23	Mount Athos	Greece	
ℓ 667	11th	Gospels^{esk}	αω	193	Esphigmenou Monastery, 24	Mount Athos	Greece	
ℓ 668	9th	Gospels	ΑΩ P^{U}	175	Esphigmenou Monastery, 27	Mount Athos	Greece	
ℓ 669	14th	†Gospels^{e}	αω	272	Esphigmenou Monastery, 28	Mount Athos	Greece	
ℓ 670	12th	†Gospels^{e}	αω	182	Esphigmenou Monastery, 35	Mount Athos	Greece	
ℓ 671	13th	†Gospels	αω	84	Esphigmenou Monastery, 60	Mount Athos	Greece	
ℓ 672	9th	Gospels^{esk}	ΑΩ	312	Iviron Monastery, 1	Mount Athos	Greece	INTF
ℓ 673	12th	†Gospels^{e}	αω	298	Iviron Monastery, 3	Mount Athos	Greece	
ℓ 674	14th	Gospels^{esk}	αω	205	Iviron Monastery, 4	Mount Athos	Greece	
ℓ 675	12th	Gospels^{sel}	αω	269	Iviron Monastery, 6	Mount Athos	Greece	
ℓ 676	13th	Gospels^{esk}	αω	164	Iviron Monastery, 20	Mount Athos	Greece	
ℓ 677	1205	†Gospels^{esk}	αω	186	Iviron Monastery, 23	Mount Athos	Greece	
ℓ 678	14th	Gospels^{esk}	αω	145	Iviron Monastery, 35	Mount Athos	Greece	
ℓ 679	1201	Gospels^{esk}	αω	209	Iviron Monastery, 305	Mount Athos	Greece	
ℓ 680	13th	Gospels + Apostles^{e}	αω	262	Iviron Monastery, 245	Mount Athos	Greece	INTF, Library of Congress
ℓ 681	1642	Gospels + Apostles^{Lit}	αω	322	Iviron Monastery, 826	Mount Athos	Greece	
ℓ 682	14th	†Gospels^{esk}	αω	299	Iviron Monastery, 637	Mount Athos	Greece	
ℓ 683	15th	†Gospels^{e}	αω	350	Iviron Monastery, 638	Mount Athos	Greece	
ℓ 684	16th	Gospels^{esk}	αω	228	Iviron Monastery, 639	Mount Athos	Greece	
ℓ 685	16th	†Gospels^{esk}	αω	197	Iviron Monastery, 640	Mount Athos	Greece	
ℓ 686	16th	†Gospels + Apostles	αω	191	Iviron Monastery, 825	Mount Athos	Greece	
ℓ 687	16th	Gospels + Apostles^{sel}	αω	76	Iviron Monastery, 884	Mount Athos	Greece	
ℓ 688	14th	†Gospels^{e}	αω	336	Karakallou Monastery, 10	Mount Athos	Greece	
ℓ 689	10th/11th (?)	Gospels^{esk}	ΑΩ	228	Karakallou Monastery, 11	Mount Athos	Greece	MAR
ℓ 690	13th	Gospels^{e}	αω	251	Karakallou Monastery, 15	Mount Athos	Greece	
ℓ 691	13th	†Gospels^{esk}	αω	103	Karakallou Monastery, 16	Mount Athos	Greece	MAR
ℓ 692	1232	Gospels^{sk}	αω	241	Karakallou Monastery, 17	Mount Athos	Greece	
ℓ 693	15th	Gospels^{Lit}	αω	28	Iviron Monastery, 880	Mount Athos	Greece	
ℓ 694	14th	Gospels^{e}	αω	325	Konstamonitou Monastery, 98	Mount Athos	Greece	
ℓ 695	14th	Gospels^{esk}	αω P^{O}	153	Konstamonitou Monastery, 99	Mount Athos	Greece	
ℓ 696	12th	Gospels^{esk}	αω	256	Koutloumousiou Monastery, 60	Mount Athos	Greece	
ℓ 697	12th	†Gospels^{esk}	αω	278	Koutloumousiou Monastery, 61	Mount Athos	Greece	
ℓ 698	13th	Gospels^{e}	αω	288	Koutloumousiou Monastery, 62	Mount Athos	Greece	INTF
ℓ 699	12th	Gospels^{esk}	αω	337	Koutloumousiou Monastery, 63	Mount Athos	Greece	
ℓ 700	12th	Gospels^{e}	αω	238	Koutloumousiou Monastery, 64	Mount Athos	Greece	

[top]

=== Lectionaries 701–800 ===
#	Date	Contents	Script	Pages	Institution	City, State	Country	Images
ℓ 701	12th	†Gospels^{e}	αω	306	Koutloumousiou Monastery, 65	Mount Athos	Greece	
ℓ 702	11th	Gospels^{esk}	αω	165	Koutloumousiou Monastery, 66	Mount Athos	Greece	
ℓ 703	9th	Gospels^{P}	ΑΩ P^{U}	41	Koutloumousiou Monastery, 86	Mount Athos	Greece	
ℓ 704	10th	Gospels^{esk}	ΑΩ	247	Koutloumousiou Monastery, 90	Mount Athos	Greece	INTF
ℓ 705	12th	†Gospels^{e}	αω	226	Konstamonitou Monastery, 100	Mount Athos	Greece	
ℓ 706	16th	†Gospels^{e}	αω	133	Koutloumousiou Monastery, 280	Mount Athos	Greece	
ℓ 707	16th	Gospels + Apostles^{k}	αω	292	Koutloumousiou Monastery, 282	Mount Athos	Greece	
ℓ 708	16th	Gospels^{e}	αω	271	Koutloumousiou Monastery, 292	Mount Athos	Greece	
ℓ 709	11th	†Gospels^{esk}	αω	163	Xenophontos Monastery, 3	Mount Athos	Greece	MAR
ℓ 710	1181	Gospels^{esk}	αω	101	Xenophontos Monastery, 1	Mount Athos	Greece	MAR
ℓ 710	1181	Gospels^{esk}	αω	1	Russian National Library, Gr. 298	Saint Petersburg	Russia	
ℓ 711	16th	Gospels^{esk}	αω	235	Xenophontos Monastery, 58	Mount Athos	Greece	
ℓ 712	16th	Gospels + Apostles^{Lit}	αω	134	Xenophontos Monastery, 59	Mount Athos	Greece	
ℓ 713	18th	Gospels^{Lit-P}	αω	66	Xenophontos Monastery, 68	Mount Athos	Greece	
ℓ 714	13th	†Gospels^{esk}	αω	155	Xeropotamou Monastery, 110	Mount Athos	Greece	
ℓ 715	13th	†Gospels^{(e)sk}	αω	230	Xeropotamou Monastery, 112	Mount Athos	Greece	
ℓ 716	12th	Gospels^{P}	αω	3	State Library, 10	Vytina	Greece	
ℓ 716	12th	Gospels^{P}	αω	62	Xeropotamou Monastery, 118	Mount Athos	Greece	
ℓ 716	12th	Gospels^{P}	αω	2	St. Panteleimon Monastery, 97,3	Mount Athos	Greece	
ℓ 716	12th	Gospels^{P}	αω	2	Agios Lavrentios Church, Σπ	Pelion	Greece	
ℓ 717	16th	Gospels^{e}	αω	401	Xeropotamou Monastery, 122	Mount Athos	Greece	INTF
ℓ 718	1654	Gospels^{e}	αω	275	Xeropotamou Monastery, 125	Mount Athos	Greece	
ℓ 719	1586	Gospels^{e}	αω	366	Xeropotamou Monastery, 126	Mount Athos	Greece	INTF
ℓ 720	9th	Gospels^{P}	ΑΩ	2	Xeropotamou Monastery, 234	Mount Athos	Greece	
ℓ 721	17th	Gospels + Apostles^{Lit}	αω	71	Xeropotamou Monastery, 247	Mount Athos	Greece	
ℓ 722	10th	Gospels^{P}	ΑΩ	21	St. Panteleimon Monastery, 62	Mount Athos	Greece	
ℓ 723	12th	Gospels^{(e)sk}	αω	171	St. Panteleimon Monastery, 4	Mount Athos	Greece	
ℓ 724	12th/ 13th	†Gospels^{e}	αω	249	St. Panteleimon Monastery, 1	Mount Athos	Greece	
ℓ 725	12th	Gospels^{(es)k}	αω	256	St. Panteleimon Monastery, 2	Mount Athos	Greece	
ℓ 726	12th	Gospels^{e}	αω	301	St. Panteleimon Monastery, 3	Mount Athos	Greece	
ℓ 727	14th	Gospels^{esk}	αω	236	St. Panteleimon Monastery, 32	Mount Athos	Greece	
ℓ 728	13th	Gospels^{P}	αω	50	Agiou Pavlou Monastery, 1	Mount Athos	Greece	
ℓ 729	12th	Gospels^{e}	αω	281	Church of Protaton, 11	Mount Athos	Greece	MAR
ℓ 730	9th	Gospels^{P}	ΑΩ	2	Church of Protaton, 13	Mount Athos	Greece	
ℓ 731	11th	Gospels^{e}	αω	267	Church of Protaton, 15	Mount Athos	Greece	MAR
ℓ 732	14th	Gospels^{e}	αω	278	Church of Protaton, 44	Mount Athos	Greece	
ℓ 733	18th	Gospels^{Lit-P}	αω	74	Osiou Gregoriou Monastery, 71	Mount Athos	Greece	
ℓ 734	9th	Gospels^{P}	ΑΩ	3	Church of Protaton, 14, fol. 1.2.246	Mount Athos	Greece	
ℓ 735	9th	Gospels^{esk}	ΑΩ	234	Church of Protaton, 20	Mount Athos	Greece	MAR
ℓ 736	16th	Gospels + Apostles^{Lit}	αω	?	Philotheou Monastery, 213	Mount Athos	Greece	
ℓ 737	16th	Gospels + Apostles^{Lit}	αω	10	Hilandar Monastery, 15	Mount Athos	Greece	
ℓ 738	1524	Apostles^{esk}	αω	150	Docheiariou Monastery, 146	Mount Athos	Greece	
ℓ 739	16th	†Apostles^{e}	αω	247	Iviron Monastery, 831	Mount Athos	Greece	
ℓ 740	11th	†Apostles^{e}	αω	183	Karakallou Monastery, 3	Mount Athos	Greece	
ℓ 741	15th	Apostles^{esk}	αω	160	Karakallou Monastery, 66	Mount Athos	Greece	
ℓ 742	17th	†Apostles^{e}	αω	346	Konstamonitou Monastery, 21	Mount Athos	Greece	
ℓ 743	14th	†Apostles^{e}	αω	338	Konstamonitou Monastery, 22	Mount Athos	Greece	
ℓ 744	14th	†Gospels^{e}	αω	305	Stavronikita Monastery, 1	Mount Athos	Greece	MAR
ℓ 745	14th	Gospels^{e}	αω	337	Stavronikita Monastery, 27	Mount Athos	Greece	MAR
ℓ 746	13th	Gospels^{esk}	αω	166	Stavronikita Monastery, 42	Mount Athos	Greece	MAR
ℓ 747	1319	Gospels + Apostles^{esk}	αω	187	Stavronikita Monastery, 102	Mount Athos	Greece	
ℓ 748	13th	Gospels^{e}	αω	351	Philotheou Monastery, 1	Mount Athos	Greece	
ℓ 749	9th	Gospels^{P}	ΑΩ	36	Philotheou Monastery, 2	Mount Athos	Greece	
ℓ 750	13th	Gospels^{e}	αω	323	Philotheou Monastery, 3	Mount Athos	Greece	
ℓ 751	11th	†Gospels + Apostles^{esk}	αω	344	Philotheou Monastery, 6	Mount Athos	Greece	
ℓ 752	12th	†Gospels^{e}	αω	332	Philotheou Monastery, 18	Mount Athos	Greece	
ℓ 753	14th	Apostles^{skl}	αω	202	Philotheou Monastery, 25	Mount Athos	Greece	
ℓ 754	1583	Gospels^{e}	αω	209	Philotheou Monastery, 61	Mount Athos	Greece	
ℓ 755	15th	Gospels^{Lit}	αω	164	Philotheou Monastery, 1889 (125)	Mount Athos	Greece	
ℓ 756	13th	Gospels^{esk}	αω	107	Hilandar Monastery, 6	Mount Athos	Greece	
ℓ 757	14th	Gospels^{sel}	αω	188	Hilandar Monastery, 105	Mount Athos	Greece	
ℓ 758	11th	Gospels	αω	310	Owner unknown			
ℓ 759	1521	Gospels + Apostles^{Lit}	αω	430	Greek Orthodox Patriarchate, 222	Alexandria	Egypt	
ℓ 760	14th	Gospels^{esk}	αω	171	Greek Orthodox Patriarchate, 45	Alexandria	Egypt	
ℓ 761	14th	†Gospels^{esk}	αω	312	Greek Orthodox Patriarchate, 45	Alexandria	Egypt	
ℓ 761	14th	†Gospels^{esk}	αω	1	Russian National Library, Gr. 397	Saint Petersburg	Russia	
ℓ 762	14th	Gospels^{esk}	αω	421	Greek Orthodox Patriarchate, 163	Alexandria	Egypt	
ℓ 763	14th	Gospels^{e}	αω	396	Greek Orthodox Patriarchate, 9	Alexandria	Egypt	
ℓ 764	12th	†Gospels^{(e)sk}	αω	207	Greek Orthodox Patriarchate, 55	Alexandria	Egypt	
ℓ 765	13th	Gospels^{e}	αω	253	Greek Orthodox Patriarchate, 17	Alexandria	Egypt	
ℓ 766	12th	†Gospels^{e}	αω	256	Greek Orthodox Patriarchate, 53, fol. 5-260	Alexandria	Egypt	
ℓ 767	14th	Gospels^{esk}	αω	324	Greek Orthodox Patriarchate, 85	Alexandria	Egypt	
ℓ 768	11th	†Gospels^{e}	αω	269	Greek Orthodox Patriarchate, 59	Alexandria	Egypt	INTF
ℓ 769	14th	Gospels^{esk}	αω	216	Greek Orthodox Patriarchate, 54	Alexandria	Egypt	
ℓ 770	10th	Gospels^{e}	αω	330	Ecumenical Patriarchate, Triados 1	Istanbul	Turkey	CSNTM
ℓ 771	?	Gospels	αω	?	Ecumenical Patriarchate, Chalki, Triados, 2	Istanbul	Turkey	
ℓ 772	?	Gospels	αω	?	Ecumenical Patriarchate, Chalki, Triados, 3	Istanbul	Turkey	
ℓ 773	11th	Gospels^{e}	αω	247	Ecumenical Patriarchate, Triados 4 (2)	Istanbul	Turkey	CSNTM
ℓ 774	1188	Gospels^{esk}	αω	155	Ecumenical Patriarchate, Triados 5 (3)	Istanbul	Turkey	CSNTM
ℓ 775	15th	Gospels^{esk}	αω	150	Ecumenical Patriarchate, Chalki, Triados, 6	Istanbul	Turkey	
ℓ 776	14th	Gospels^{e}	αω	435	Ecumenical Patriarchate, Chalki, Triados, 7	Istanbul	Turkey	
ℓ 777	13th	Gospels^{esk}	αω	123	Ecumenical Patriarchate, Triados 8 (6)	Istanbul	Turkey	CSNTM
ℓ 778	14th	Gospels^{e}	αω	158	Ecumenical Patriarchate, Chalki, Triados, 9	Istanbul	Turkey	
ℓ 779	1403	Gospels^{esk}	αω	288	Ecumenical Patriarchate, Triados 10 (8)	Istanbul	Turkey	CSNTM
ℓ 780	13th	Gospels^{esk}	αω	324	Ecumenical Patriarchate, Theological School of Chalki, 1	Istanbul	Turkey	
ℓ 781	14th	Gospels^{esk}	αω	193	Ecumenical Patriarchate, Theological School of Chalki, 2	Istanbul	Turkey	
ℓ 782	12th	Gospels^{esk}	αω	159	Ecumenical Patriarchate, Theological School of Chalki 3	Istanbul	Turkey	CSNTM
ℓ 783	1542	Gospels^{e}	αω	245	Ecumenical Patriarchate, Theological School of Chalki 4	Istanbul	Turkey	INTF
ℓ 784	11th	Gospels^{esk}	αω	132	Ecumenical Patriarchate, Theological School of Chalki 5	Istanbul	Turkey	CSNTM
ℓ 785	14th	Gospels^{esk}	αω	124	Ecumenical Patriarchate, Theological School of Chalki 6	Istanbul	Turkey	CSNTM
ℓ 786	13th	Gospels^{esk}	αω	199	Ecumenical Patriarchate, Theological School of Chalki 7	Istanbul	Turkey	CSNTM
ℓ 787	12th	†Gospels^{e}	αω	262	Ecumenical Patriarchate, Kamariotissis 12	Istanbul	Turkey	CSNTM
ℓ 788	14th	Gospels^{esk}	αω	130	Ecumenical Patriarchate, Theological School of Chalki 76	Istanbul	Turkey	
ℓ 789	14th	Gospels^{esk}	αω	267	Ecumenical Patriarchate, Kamariotissis 84 (81)	Istanbul	Turkey	CSNTM
ℓ 790	13th	Gospels^{esk}	αω	334	Ecumenical Patriarchate, Skevophylakion, 2	Istanbul	Turkey	
ℓ 791	13th	Gospels^{e}	αω	416	Ecumenical Patriarchate, Skevophylakion, 1	Istanbul	Turkey	INTF
ℓ 792	13th	Gospels^{e}	αω	369	National Library of Greece	Athens	Greece	INTF
ℓ 793	12th	Gospels^{esk}	αω	227	University of Toronto The Thomas Fisher Rare Book Library, MSS 05316	Toronto	Canada	UoT
ℓ 794	12th	Gospels^{e}	αω	376	National Library of Greece	Athens	Greece	
ℓ 795	13th	Gospels^{e}	αω	257	National Library of Greece	Athens	Greece	
ℓ 796	15th	†Gospels^{esk}	αω	249	Turkish Historical Society, 48	Ankara	Turkey	
ℓ 797	13th	Gospels^{esk}	αω	148	Greek Orthodox Patriarchate, 56	Alexandria	Egypt	
ℓ 798	10th	†Gospels^{esk}	ΑΩ	79	Leimonos Monastery, 1	Kalloni, Lesbos	Greece	LM
ℓ 799	10th	Gospels^{esk}	αω	288	Leimonos Monastery, 37	Kalloni, Lesbos	Greece	LM
ℓ 800	11th	Gospels^{e}	αω	319	Leimonos Monastery, 38	Kalloni, Lesbos	Greece	LM

[top]

=== Lectionaries 801–900 ===
#	Date	Contents	Script	Pages	Institution	City, State	Country	Images
ℓ 801	14th	Gospels^{e}	αω	355	Leimonos Monastery, 40	Kalloni, Lesbos	Greece	LM
ℓ 802	12th	Gospels^{e}	αω	221	Leimonos Monastery, 41	Kalloni, Lesbos	Greece	LM
ℓ 803	12th	Gospels^{e}	αω	428	Leimonos Monastery, 66	Kalloni, Lesbos	Greece	LM
ℓ 804	13th	Gospels^{P}	αω	81	Greek Orthodox Patriarchate, 314	Alexandria	Egypt	
ℓ 805	9th	Gospels^{esk}	ΑΩ	287	Monastery of Saint John the Theologian, 68	Patmos	Greece	INTF
ℓ 806	9th	Gospels^{esk}	ΑΩ	205	Monastery of Saint John the Theologian, 69	Patmos	Greece	INTF
ℓ 807	9th	Gospels^{esk}	ΑΩ	295	Monastery of Saint John the Theologian, MS 70	Patmos	Greece	CSNTM
ℓ 808	9th	Gospels^{esk}	ΑΩ	185	Monastery of Saint John the Theologian, 71	Patmos	Greece	
ℓ 809	12th	Apostles^{e}	αω	286	Saint Catherine's Monastery, Gr. 286	Sinai	Egypt	CSNTM
ℓ 810	12th	Gospels^{e}	αω	330	Monastery of Saint John the Theologian, 73	Patmos	Greece	
ℓ 811	12th	Gospels^{e}	αω	342	Monastery of Saint John the Theologian, 74	Patmos	Greece	
ℓ 812	12th	Gospels^{e}	αω	293	Monastery of Saint John the Theologian, 75	Patmos	Greece	
ℓ 813	1069	Gospels^{e}	αω	331	Monastery of Saint John the Theologian, 77	Patmos	Greece	
ℓ 814	10th	Gospels^{esk}	αω	183	Monastery of Saint John the Theologian, 78	Patmos	Greece	
ℓ 815	11th	Gospels^{esk}	αω	315	Monastery of Saint John the Theologian, 79	Patmos	Greece	
ℓ 816	11th	†Gospels^{esk}	αω	210	Monastery of Saint John the Theologian, 85	Patmos	Greece	
ℓ 817	11th	†Gospels^{esk}	αω	175	Monastery of Saint John the Theologian, 86	Patmos	Greece	
ℓ 818	13th	Gospels^{P}	αω	18	Greek Orthodox Patriarchate, 1	Alexandria	Egypt	
ℓ 819	13th	Gospels^{e}	αω	296	Monastery of Saint John the Theologian, 88	Patmos	Greece	
ℓ 820	14th	†Gospels^{esk}	αω	144	Monastery of Saint John the Theologian, 89	Patmos	Greece	
ℓ 821	12th	†Gospels^{e}	αω	205	Monastery of Saint John the Theologian, 91	Patmos	Greece	
ℓ 822	1205	Gospels^{e}	αω	252	Monastery of Saint John the Theologian, 93	Patmos	Greece	
ℓ 823	10th	Gospels^{esk}	ΑΩ	195	Monastery of Saint John the Theologian, 99	Patmos	Greece	
ℓ 824	14th	†Gospels^{esk}	αω	123	Monastery of Saint John the Theologian, 101	Patmos	Greece	
ℓ 825	1427	Gospels^{esk}	αω	283	Monastery of Saint John the Theologian, 330	Patmos	Greece	
ℓ 826	15th	Gospels^{e}	αω	241	Monastery of Saint John the Theologian, 331	Patmos	Greece	
ℓ 827	1443	Gospels^{e}	αω	333	Monastery of Saint John the Theologian, 332	Patmos	Greece	INTF
ℓ 828	12th	Gospels^{P}	αω	6	Greek Orthodox Patriarchate, 12, fol. 358-363	Alexandria	Egypt	
ℓ 829	14th	Gospels^{P}	αω	7	Greek Orthodox Patriarchate, 60	Alexandria	Egypt	
ℓ 830	9th	†Gospels^{esk}	ΑΩ	87	Byzantine and Christian Museum, 159	Athens	Greece	
ℓ 831	14th	†Gospels^{e}	αω	161	National Library of Greece, 2054	Athens	Greece	
ℓ 832	15th	†Gospels^{e}	αω	273	National Library of Greece, NLG 2116	Athens	Greece	CSNTM
ℓ 833	14th	†Gospels^{e}	αω	322	St. Panteleimon Monastery, 5	Mount Athos	Greece	
ℓ 834	12th	†Gospels^{esk}	αω	185	St. Panteleimon Monastery, 30	Mount Athos	Greece	
ℓ 835	1072	Gospels^{e}	αω	293	St. Panteleimon Monastery, 27	Mount Athos	Greece	
ℓ 836	1340	Gospels^{k}	αω	231	National Library of Greece, NLG 2115	Athens	Greece	CSNTM
ℓ 837	15th	Gospels + Apostles^{P}	αω	300	National Library of Greece, NLG 2044	Athens	Greece	CSNTM
ℓ 838	1185	Gospels^{e}	αω	252	Owner Unknown			
ℓ 839	15th	Apostles^{esk}	αω	224	Konstamonitou Monastery, 23	Mount Athos	Greece	
ℓ 840	12th	Apostles^{e}	αω	160	Konstamonitou Monastery, 101	Mount Athos	Greece	
ℓ 840	12th	Apostles^{e}	αω	16	Russian Academy of Sciences Historical Institute, Dmitr. 13a	Saint Petersburg	Russia	
ℓ 841	1555	Apostles^{e}	αω	233	Koutloumousiou Monastery, 277	Mount Athos	Greece	
ℓ 842	15th	Apostles^{esk}	αω	153	Koutloumousiou Monastery, 354	Mount Athos	Greece	
ℓ 843	17th	Apostles^{esk}	αω	140	Koutloumousiou Monastery, 355	Mount Athos	Greece	
ℓ 844	862	†Gospels^{sel}	ΑΩ	188	Saint Catherine's Monastery, Gr. 210	Sinai	Egypt	CSNTM
ℓ 845	9th	Gospels^{esk}	ΑΩ	253	Saint Catherine's Monastery, Gr. 211	Sinai	Egypt	CSNTM
ℓ 846	9th	Gospels + Apostles^{sel}	ΑΩ P^{O}	114	Saint Catherine's Monastery, Gr. 212	Sinai	Egypt	CSNTM
ℓ 847	967	Gospels^{esk}	ΑΩ	339	Saint Catherine's Monastery, Gr. 213	Sinai	Egypt	CSNTM
ℓ 847	967	Gospels^{esk}	ΑΩ	1	Russian National Library, Gr. 282	Saint Petersburg	Russia	
ℓ 848	9th	†Gospels^{esk}	ΑΩ	153	Saint Catherine's Monastery, Gr. 214	Sinai	Egypt	CSNTM
ℓ 849	9th	†Gospels^{esk}	ΑΩ	29	Saint Catherine's Monastery, Gr. 215	Sinai	Egypt	CSNTM
ℓ 850	12th	Gospels^{e}	αω	261	Saint Catherine's Monastery, Gr. 216	Sinai	Egypt	CSNTM
ℓ 851	11th	Gospels^{esk}	αω	341	Saint Catherine's Monastery, Gr. 217	Sinai	Egypt	CSNTM
ℓ 852	12th	Gospels^{e}	αω	336	Saint Catherine's Monastery, Gr. 218	Sinai	Egypt	CSNTM
ℓ 853	11th	Gospels^{e}	αω	270	Saint Catherine's Monastery, Gr. 219	Sinai	Egypt	CSNTM
ℓ 854	1167	Gospels^{e}	αω	355	Saint Catherine's Monastery, Gr. 220	Sinai	Egypt	CSNTM
ℓ 855	1175	Gospels^{e}	αω	284	Saint Catherine's Monastery, Gr. 221	Sinai	Egypt	CSNTM
ℓ 856	12th	Gospels^{esk}	αω	421	Saint Catherine's Monastery, Gr. 222	Sinai	Egypt	CSNTM
ℓ 857	11th	Gospels^{esk}	αω	206	Saint Catherine's Monastery, Gr. 223	Sinai	Egypt	
ℓ 857	11th	Gospels^{esk}	αω	1	Russian National Library, Gr. 289	Saint Petersburg	Russia	
ℓ 858	12th	†Gospels^{esk}	αω	169	Saint Catherine's Monastery, Gr. 224	Sinai	Egypt	CSNTM
ℓ 859	11th	†Gospels^{esk}	αω	156	Saint Catherine's Monastery, Gr. 225	Sinai	Egypt	CSNTM
ℓ 860	12th	†Gospels^{esk}	αω	224	Saint Catherine's Monastery, Gr. 226	Sinai	Egypt	CSNTM
ℓ 861	12th	Gospels^{e}	αω	281	Saint Catherine's Monastery, Gr. 227	Sinai	Egypt	CSNTM
ℓ 862	13th	Gospels^{sk}	αω	323	Saint Catherine's Monastery, Gr. 228	Sinai	Egypt	CSNTM
ℓ 863	11th	†Gospels^{esk}	αω	242	Saint Catherine's Monastery, Gr. 229	Sinai	Egypt	CSNTM
ℓ 864	11th	Gospels^{esk}	αω	273	Saint Catherine's Monastery, Gr. 230	Sinai	Egypt	CSNTM
ℓ 865	11th	Gospels^{esk}	αω	151	Saint Catherine's Monastery, Gr. 231	Sinai	Egypt	CSNTM
ℓ 865	11th	Gospels^{esk}	αω	1	Russian National Library, Gr. 288	Saint Petersburg	Russia	
ℓ 866	1174	Gospels^{esk}	αω	143	Saint Catherine's Monastery, Gr. 232	Sinai	Egypt	CSNTM
ℓ 867	12th	Gospels^{e}	αω	273	Saint Catherine's Monastery, Gr. 233	Sinai	Egypt	CSNTM
[ℓ 868]=ℓ 1405								
ℓ 869	12th	Gospels^{esk}	αω	240	Saint Catherine's Monastery, Gr. 235	Sinai	Egypt	CSNTM
ℓ 870	11th	Gospels^{esk}	αω	236	Saint Catherine's Monastery, Gr. 236	Sinai	Egypt	CSNTM
ℓ 871	12th	Gospels^{esk}	αω	208	Saint Catherine's Monastery, Gr. 237	Sinai	Egypt	CSNTM
ℓ 872	14th	Apostles^{e}	αω	194	Church of Protaton, 54	Mount Athos	Greece	
ℓ 873	1554	Apostles^{esk}	αω	162	Stavronikita Monastery, 129	Mount Athos	Greece	
ℓ 874	16th	Gospels^{e}	αω	365	Saint Catherine's Monastery, Gr. 240	Sinai	Egypt	CSNTM
ℓ 875	11th	†Gospels^{esk}	αω	230	Saint Catherine's Monastery, Gr. 241	Sinai	Egypt	CSNTM
ℓ 876	12th	†Gospels^{e}	αω	182	Saint Catherine's Monastery, Gr. 242	Sinai	Egypt	CSNTM
ℓ 877	11th	†Gospels^{(esk)}	αω	118	Saint Catherine's Monastery, Gr. 243	Sinai	Egypt	CSNTM
ℓ 878	12th	†Gospels^{esk}	αω	2	Saint Catherine's Monastery, Gr. 244; Gr. 245	Sinai	Egypt	CSNTM
[ℓ 879]								
ℓ 880	13th	Gospels^{P}	αω	56	Saint Catherine's Monastery, Gr. 246	Sinai	Egypt	CSNTM
ℓ 881	14th	Apostles^{e}	αω	216	Philotheou Monastery, 17	Mount Athos	Greece	
ℓ 882	13th	Apostles	αω	?	National Archives of Albania	Tirana	Albania	
ℓ 883	11th	Apostles^{e}	αω	233	Ecumenical Patriarchate, Triados 13 (11)	Istanbul	Turkey	CSNTM
ℓ 884	13th	†Apostles^{e}	αω	206	Ecumenical Patriarchate, Chalki, Triados, 14	Istanbul	Turkey	INTF
ℓ 885	15th	Gospels^{esk}	αω	226	Saint Catherine's Monastery, Gr. 251	Sinai	Egypt	CSNTM
ℓ 886	16th	Gospels^{e}	αω	408	Saint Catherine's Monastery, Gr. 252	Sinai	Egypt	CSNTM
ℓ 887	14th	Gospels^{esk}	αω	300	Saint Catherine's Monastery, Gr. 253	Sinai	Egypt	CSNTM
ℓ 888	14th	Gospels^{e}	αω	331	Saint Catherine's Monastery, Gr. 254	Sinai	Egypt	CSNTM
ℓ 889	14th	Gospels^{esk}	αω	401	Saint Catherine's Monastery, Gr. 255	Sinai	Egypt	CSNTM
ℓ 890	1420	Gospels^{sk}	αω	277	Saint Catherine's Monastery, Gr. 256	Sinai	Egypt	CSNTM
ℓ 891	1102	†Gospels^{esk}	αω	212	Saint Catherine's Monastery, Gr. 257	Sinai	Egypt	CSNTM
ℓ 892	15th	Gospels + Apostles^{sk}	αω	224	Saint Catherine's Monastery, Gr. 258	Sinai	Egypt	CSNTM
ℓ 893	15th	Gospels + Apostles^{esk}	αω	404	Saint Catherine's Monastery, Gr. 271	Sinai	Egypt	CSNTM
ℓ 894	15th	†Gospels + Apostles^{esk}	αω	146	Saint Catherine's Monastery, Gr. 272	Sinai	Egypt	CSNTM
ℓ 895	13th	Apostles^{esk}	αω	134	Ecumenical Patriarchate, Chalki, Triados, 15	Istanbul	Turkey	INTF
ℓ 896	13th	Gospels^{Lit}	αω	489	Saint Catherine's Monastery, Gr. 550	Sinai	Egypt	CSNTM
ℓ 897	1522	Gospels^{Lit}	αω	397	Saint Catherine's Monastery, Gr. 659	Sinai	Egypt	CSNTM
ℓ 898	17th	Gospels + Apostles^{Lit}	αω	38	Saint Catherine's Monastery, Gr. 720	Sinai	Egypt	
ℓ 899	14th	Gospels + Apostles^{Lit}	αω	330	Saint Catherine's Monastery, Gr. 738	Sinai	Egypt	
ℓ 900	15th	†Gospels + Apostles^{Lit}	αω	160	Saint Catherine's Monastery, Gr. 748	Sinai	Egypt	

[top]

=== Lectionaries 901–1000 ===
#	Date	Contents	Script	Pages	Institution	City, State	Country	Images
ℓ 901	12th	Gospels + Apostles^{Lit}	αω	322	Saint Catherine's Monastery, Gr. 754	Sinai	Egypt	CSNTM
ℓ 901	12th	Gospels + Apostles^{Lit}	αω	1	Russian National Library, Gr. 405	Saint Petersburg	Russia	
ℓ 902	13th	Gospels + Apostles^{Lit}	αω	307	Saint Catherine's Monastery, Gr. 756	Sinai	Egypt	CSNTM
ℓ 903	13th	Gospels + Apostles^{Lit}	αω	166	Saint Catherine's Monastery, Gr. 775	Sinai	Egypt	CSNTM
ℓ 904	13th	†Gospels + Apostles^{Lit}	αω	268	Saint Catherine's Monastery, Gr. 796	Sinai	Egypt	CSNTM
ℓ 905	14th	Gospels + Apostles^{Lit}	αω	107	Saint Catherine's Monastery, Gr. 1042	Sinai	Egypt	
ℓ 906	14th	Gospels + Apostles^{Lit}	αω	254	Saint Catherine's Monastery, Gr. 800	Sinai	Egypt	
ℓ 907	9th	Gospels^{esk}	ΑΩ P^{U}	82	Saint Catherine's Monastery, Gr. 929	Sinai	Egypt	CSNTM
ℓ 907	9th	Gospels^{esk}	ΑΩ P^{U}	1	Russian National Library, Gr. 372	Saint Petersburg	Russia	
ℓ 908	1697	Gospels^{Lit}	αω	80	Saint Catherine's Monastery, Gr. 943	Sinai	Egypt	
ℓ 909	10th	Gospels + Apostles^{Lit}	αω	86	Saint Catherine's Monastery, Gr. 957	Sinai	Egypt	CSNTM
ℓ 909	10th	Gospels + Apostles^{Lit}	αω	82	Russian National Library, Gr. 418	Saint Petersburg	Russia	
ℓ 910	13th	Gospels + Apostles^{Lit}	αω P^{O}	155	Saint Catherine's Monastery, Gr. 960	Sinai	Egypt	CSNTM
ℓ 911	12th	Gospels + Apostles^{Lit}	αω	100	Saint Catherine's Monastery, Gr. 961	Sinai	Egypt	CSNTM
ℓ 912	12th	Gospels + Apostles^{Lit}	αω	202	Saint Catherine's Monastery, Gr. 962	Sinai	Egypt	CSNTM
ℓ 913	14th	Gospels + Apostles^{Lit}	αω	53	Saint Catherine's Monastery, Gr. 965	Sinai	Egypt	
ℓ 914	1426	Gospels + Apostles^{Lit}	αω	489	Saint Catherine's Monastery, Gr. 968	Sinai	Egypt	CSNTM
ℓ 914	1426	Gospels + Apostles^{Lit}	αω	1	Russian National Library, Gr. 323	Saint Petersburg	Russia	
ℓ 915	15th	Gospels + Apostles^{Lit}	αω	430	Saint Catherine's Monastery, Gr. 972	Sinai	Egypt	
ℓ 916	12th	Gospels + Apostles^{Lit}	αω	168	Saint Catherine's Monastery, Gr. 973	Sinai	Egypt	CSNTM
ℓ 916	12th	Gospels + Apostles^{Lit}	αω	1	Russian National Library, Gr. 418	Saint Petersburg	Russia	
ℓ 917	15th	Gospels + Apostles^{Lit}	αω	495	Saint Catherine's Monastery, Gr. 977	Sinai	Egypt	
ℓ 918	14th	Gospels + Apostles^{Lit}	αω	294	Saint Catherine's Monastery, Gr. 981	Sinai	Egypt	
ℓ 919	14th	Gospels + Apostles^{Lit}	αω	211	Saint Catherine's Monastery, Gr. 982	Sinai	Egypt	
ℓ 920	15th	Gospels + Apostles^{Lit}	αω	140	Saint Catherine's Monastery, Gr. 986	Sinai	Egypt	
ℓ 921	12th	Apostles^{e}	αω	234	Ecumenical Patriarchate, Chalki, Kamariotissis, 59	Istanbul	Turkey	CSNTM
ℓ 922	11th	Gospels^{P}	αω	1	Bodleian Library, E. D. Clarke 9, fol. III. 182 (fol. 1-181: 383)	Oxford	United Kingdom	
ℓ 923		Gospels + Apostles^{P}	αω		Owner Unknown			
ℓ 924	12th	Gospels + Apostles^{Lit}	αω	166	Vatican Library, Reg. gr. 54	Vatican City	Vatican City	
ℓ 925	17th	Gospels^{Lit}	αω	65	Marciana National Library, Gr. II,188 (1402)	Venice	Italy	
ℓ 926	12th	Gospels^{P}	αω P^{U}	26	British Library, Add MS 10068	London	United Kingdom	BL
ℓ 927	14th	Gospels + Apostles^{Lit}	αω	270	British Library, Add MS 24378	London	United Kingdom	BL
ℓ 928	13th	John 5:24-45	αω	1	National Library, Supplement Grec 179.180, fol. 79	Paris	France	INTF
ℓ 929	12th	Gospels + Apostles^{Lit}	αω	26	Union Theological Seminary The Burke Library, UTS MS 041	New York, NY	United States	UC
ℓ 930	13th	†Gospels^{e}	αω	230	British Library, Add MS 19459	London	United Kingdom	BL
ℓ 931	15th	Gospels + Apostles^{k}	αω	75	Marciana National Library, Gr. II,130 (1173)	Venice	Italy	
ℓ 932	13th	Gospels^{PsO}	αω	117	British Library, Add MS 40656	London	United Kingdom	BL
ℓ 933	13th	Gospels^{k-K}	αω	142	Vallicelliana Library, C. 7	Rome	Italy	
ℓ 934	966	Gospels^{PsO-K}	αω	222	Russian National Library, Gr. 64	Saint Petersburg	Russia	
ℓ 935	12th	Gospels + Apostles^{Lit}	αω	478	National Library, Grec 13	Paris	France	
ℓ 936	13th	Gospels + Apostles^{Lit}	αω	200	National Library, Grec 263	Paris	France	BnF
ℓ 937	13th	Gospels + Apostles^{Lit}	αω	70	Owner Unknown			
ℓ 938	13th	Apostles^{e}	αω	239	Ecumenical Patriarchate, Kamariotissis 74 (71)	Istanbul	Turkey	CSNTM
ℓ 939	12th	Gospels^{esk}	αω	238	British Library, Add MS 34059	London	United Kingdom	BL
ℓ 940	13th	Gospels^{Lit}	αω	147	British Library, Egerton MS 2743	London	United Kingdom	BL
ℓ 941	12th	†Gospels^{esk}	αω	165	British Library, Egerton MS 2745	London	United Kingdom	BL
ℓ 942	12th	Gospels^{sel}	αω	210	Topkapi Palace Museum, 21	Istanbul	Turkey	INTF
ℓ 943	14th	Gospels^{esk}	αω	295	Russian National Library, Gr. 185	Saint Petersburg	Russia	
ℓ 944	10th	Gospels^{esk}	αω	198	National and University Library, Ms. 1.895	Strasbourg	France	INTF
ℓ 945	15th/16th	Gospels + Apostles^{Lit}	αω	390	Jagiellonian Library, Graec. qu. 17	Kraków	Poland	
ℓ 946	10th	Gospels^{P}	αω	2	Berlin State Library, Graec. fol. 29	Berlin	Germany	
ℓ 946	10th	Gospels^{P}	αω	3	Saint Catherine's Monastery, N. E. Σπ. ΜΓ 26	Sinai	Egypt	
ℓ 947	12th	Gospels^{esk}	αω	284	Gesamthochschul Library, 2° Ms. theol. 61	Kassel	Germany	
ℓ 948	12th	Gospels^{P}	αω	12	University Library, Cod. Gr. 18 8	Leipzig	Germany	
ℓ 949	13th	†Gospels^{esk}	αω	159	University Library, Gr. 68	Uppsala	Sweden	UU
ℓ 950	13th	Gospels^{e}	αω	210	University Library, Gr. 69	Uppsala	Sweden	UU
ℓ 951	12th	Gospels^{e}	αω	247	Drew University Rose Memorial Library, Ms. 6	Madison, NJ	United States	CSNTM
ℓ 952	12th	†Gospels^{esk}	αω	175	Drew University Rose Memorial Library, Ms. 7	Madison, NJ	United States	CSNTM
ℓ 953	16th	Gospels^{P}	αω	13	Drew University Rose Memorial Library, Ms. 8	Madison, NJ	United States	CSNTM
ℓ 954=[ℓ 2361]	14th	Gospels^{esk}	αω	334	Owner Unknown			INTF
ℓ 955	13th	Gospels^{esk}	αω	238	Brown University, John Hay Library, Ms. Greek 1	Providence, RI	United States	
ℓ 956	15th	Gospels^{e}	αω	180	The New York Public Library, Rare Books and Manuscripts Division, MA 102	New York, NY	United States	CSNTM
ℓ 957	16th	Gospels^{P}	αω	10	National Library, Supplement Grec 1105	Paris	France	BnF
ℓ 958	13th	Gospels^{e}	αω	232	National Library, Supplement Grec 1267	Paris	France	BnF
ℓ 959	15th	Gospels + Apostles^{Lit}	αω	379	National Library, Supplement Grec 1272	Paris	France	BnF
ℓ 960	15th	Gospels + Apostles^{Lit}	αω	410	Municipal Library, Ms. 1204, Ms. 1204	Troyes	France	
ℓ 961	12th	Gospels^{P}	ΑΩ	7	National Library, Copt. 129,7, fol. 51, 56; 8, fol. 136; 9, fol. 74; 10, fol. 193; fol. 83, 84	Paris	France	
ℓ 962	11th	Gospels^{P}	ΑΩ	3	Vatican Library, Borg. copt. 109	Vatican City	Vatican City	
ℓ 962	11th	Gospels^{P}	ΑΩ	1	Musée du Louvre, E. 10039b	Paris	France	
ℓ 962	11th	Gospels^{P}	ΑΩ	2	National Library, Copt. 129,19, fol. 35f.	Paris	France	
ℓ 963+[ℓ 1614], [0100]	9th	Gospels^{P}	ΑΩ	4	University of Michigan Library, Ms. 124	Ann Arbor, MI	United States	CSNTM
ℓ 963+[ℓ 1614], [0100]	9th	Gospels^{P}	ΑΩ	1	Bodleian Library, Copt. f. 160 (P)	Oxford	United Kingdom	
ℓ 963+[ℓ 1614], [0100]	9th	Gospels^{P}	ΑΩ	5	National Library, Copt. 129,10, fol. 196; 19, fol. 57; Copt. 133,1, fol. 89, 98, 98b	Paris	France	
ℓ 964	13th	Gospels^{P}	ΑΩ	1	National Library, Copt. 129,19, fol. 65	Paris	France	
ℓ 965 + [0114]	9th	Gospels^{P}	ΑΩ	7	National Library, Copt. 129,10; 21, fol. 1-4, 10; Copt. 133,1, fol. 50	Paris	France	
ℓ 965 + [0114]	9th	Gospels^{P}	ΑΩ	1	Austrian National Library, Pap. K. 9673a	Vienna	Austria	
ℓ 966	12th	Gospels^{esk}	αω	376	Marciana National Library, Gr. I,64 (437)	Venice	Italy	
ℓ 967	10th	Gospels	αω		Owner Unknown			
ℓ 968	12th		αω	24	National Library, Suppl. Gr. 185, fol. 154-177 (fol. 1-39.68-153: 120)	Paris	France	
ℓ 968	12th		αω	6	University Library, B. P. Gr. 96	Leiden	Netherlands	
ℓ 969			αω		Panagia Hozoviotissa Monastery	Amorgos	Greece	
ℓ 970			αω		Panagia Hozoviotissa Monastery	Amorgos	Greece	
ℓ 971	1043	†Gospels^{esk}	αω	232	Russian State Library, F.270.1a.6 (Gr. 16)	Moscow	Russia	CSNTM
ℓ 972	11th	†Gospels^{esk}	αω	208	Russian State Library, F.270 07 (gr. 17)	Moscow	Russia	
ℓ 973	12th	Gospels^{esk}	αω	271	Russian State Library, F.270 09 (gr. 18)	Moscow	Russia	
ℓ 974	13th	Gospels^{P}	αω	60	Russian State Library, F.270 11 (gr. 20)	Moscow	Russia	
ℓ 975	13th	†Gospels^{e}	αω	204	Russian State Library, F.270 12 (gr. 19)	Moscow	Russia	
ℓ 976	1320	†Gospels^{e}	αω	226	Russian State Library, F.270 13 (gr. 21)	Moscow	Russia	
ℓ 977	14th	†Gospels + Apostles^{k}	αω	133	Russian State Library, F.270 14 (gr. 22)	Moscow	Russia	
ℓ 978	13th	†Gospels + Apostles	αω	140	Zoodochos Pigi Monastery (Hagias), 22	Andros	Greece	
ℓ 979	12th	Gospels^{e}	αω	408	Zoodochos Pigi Monastery (Hagias), 85	Andros	Greece	
ℓ 980	11th	Gospels^{e}	αω	283	Zoodochos Pigi Monastery (Hagias), 86	Andros	Greece	
ℓ 981	13th	†Gospels^{esk}	αω	193	Zoodochos Pigi Monastery (Hagias), 87	Andros	Greece	
ℓ 982	14th	†Gospels	αω	321	Zoodochos Pigi Monastery (Hagias), 90	Andros	Greece	
ℓ 983	13th	†Gospels^{esk}	αω	150	Zoodochos Pigi Monastery (Hagias), 92	Andros	Greece	
ℓ 984	12th	Gospels^{esk}	αω	248	Zoodochos Pigi Monastery (Hagias), 95	Andros	Greece	
ℓ 985	12th	†Gospels^{e}	αω	322	Zoodochos Pigi Monastery (Hagias), 97	Andros	Greece	
ℓ 986	13th	Gospels^{e}	αω	195	Zoodochos Pigi Monastery (Hagias), 103	Andros	Greece	
ℓ 987	12th	Gospels^{e}	αω	304	Augusteum und Lutherhaus, S. 143/2878	Wittenberg	Germany	
ℓ 988	12th	Gospels^{sk}	αω	187	Monastery of St. John the Theologian, 11	Antissa, Lesbos	Greece	
ℓ 989	12th	Gospels^{esk}	αω	110	Monastery of St. John the Theologian, 12	Antissa, Lesbos	Greece	
ℓ 990	1565	Gospels^{e}	αω	375	Plomari Club Benjamin, MS 498	Lesbos	Greece	CSNTM
ℓ 991	10th/11th	Gospels^{e}	αω	335	Patriarchate of Jerusalem, Taphu 33	Jerusalem	Israel	CSNTM
ℓ 992	1762	Gospels^{e}	αω	115	Patriarchate of Jerusalem, Taphu 105	Jerusalem	Israel	CSNTM
ℓ 993	17th	Gospels^{P}	αω	49	Patriarchate of Jerusalem, Taphu 161	Jerusalem	Israel	CSNTM
ℓ 994	1502	Gospels^{esk}	αω	108	Patriarchate of Jerusalem, Taphu 526	Jerusalem	Israel	CSNTM
ℓ 995	11th	Gospels^{e}	αω	294	Patriarchate of Jerusalem, Saba 12	Jerusalem	Israel	CSNTM
ℓ 995	11th	Gospels^{e}	αω	2	Russian National Library, Gr. 304	Saint Petersburg	Russia	
ℓ 996	11th	Gospels^{esk}	αω	207	Patriarchate of Jerusalem, Saba 23	Jerusalem	Israel	CSNTM
ℓ 997	12th	Gospels^{e}	αω	225	Patriarchate of Jerusalem, Saba 40	Jerusalem	Israel	CSNTM
ℓ 998	14th	†Gospels^{esk}	αω	318	Patriarchate of Jerusalem, Saba 58	Jerusalem	Israel	CSNTM
[ℓ 999] = ℓ 1408								
ℓ 1000	11th	†Gospels^{esk}	αω	163	Patriarchate of Jerusalem, Saba 82	Jerusalem	Israel	CSNTM

[top]

=== Lectionaries 1001–1100 ===
#	Date	Contents	Script	Pages	Institution	City, State	Country	Images
ℓ 1001	11th	†Gospels^{esk}	αω	223	Patriarchate of Jerusalem, Saba 84	Jerusalem	Israel	CSNTM
ℓ 1001	11th	†Gospels^{esk}	αω	6	Russian National Library, Gr. 307	Saint Petersburg	Russia	
ℓ 1002	12th	Gospels^{esk}	αω	176	Patriarchate of Jerusalem, Saba 104	Jerusalem	Israel	CSNTM
ℓ 1003	1019	Gospels^{esk}	αω	224	Patriarchate of Jerusalem, Saba 144	Jerusalem	Israel	CSNTM
ℓ 1003	1019	Gospels^{esk}	αω	4	Russian National Library, Gr. 287	Saint Petersburg	Russia	
ℓ 1004	11th	Gospels^{e}	αω	290	Patriarchate of Jerusalem, Saba 152	Jerusalem	Israel	CSNTM
ℓ 1005	13th	Gospels^{esk}	αω	134	Patriarchate of Jerusalem, Saba 153	Jerusalem	Israel	
ℓ 1005	13th	Gospels^{esk}	αω	2	Russian National Library, Gr. 309	Saint Petersburg	Russia	
ℓ 1006	11th	†Gospels^{esk}	αω	205	Patriarchate of Jerusalem, Saba 154	Jerusalem	Israel	
ℓ 1007	13th	†Gospels^{esk}	αω	229	Patriarchate of Jerusalem, Saba 178	Jerusalem	Israel	CSNTM
ℓ 1008=[ℓ1421]	1628	Gospels^{e}	αω	551	Patriarchate of Jerusalem, Saba 186 & 187	Jerusalem	Israel	
ℓ 1008=[ℓ1421]	1628	Gospels^{e}	αω	2	Russian National Library, Gr. 402	Saint Petersburg	Russia	
ℓ 1009	13th	†Gospels^{esk}	αω	538	Patriarchate of Jerusalem, Saba 188	Jerusalem	Israel	CSNTM
ℓ 1009	13th	†Gospels^{esk}	αω	2	Russian National Library, Gr. 401	Saint Petersburg	Russia	
ℓ 1010	13th	†Gospels^{e}	αω	320	Patriarchate of Jerusalem, Saba 202	Jerusalem	Israel	CSNTM
[ℓ 1011]=ℓ 1424								
ℓ 1012	14th	Gospels + Apostles^{esk}	αω	307	Patriarchate of Jerusalem, Saba 205	Jerusalem	Israel	CSNTM
ℓ 1013	1184	Gospels^{e}	αω	215	Patriarchate of Jerusalem, Saba 235	Jerusalem	Israel	CSNTM
ℓ 1013	1184	Gospels^{e}	αω	1	Russian National Library, Gr. 299	Saint Petersburg	Russia	
ℓ 1014	10th	†Gospels^{e}	αω	272	Patriarchate of Jerusalem, Saba 236	Jerusalem	Israel	CSNTM
ℓ 1015	13th	†Gospels^{e}	αω	207	Patriarchate of Jerusalem, Saba 245	Jerusalem	Israel	CSNTM
[ℓ 1016]=ℓ 1419								
ℓ 1017	12th	Gospels^{Lit}	αω	396	Patriarchate of Jerusalem, Saba 257	Jerusalem	Israel	
ℓ 1018	13th	†Gospels^{esk}	αω	126	Patriarchate of Jerusalem, Saba 356	Jerusalem	Israel	
ℓ 1018	13th	†Gospels^{esk}	αω	2	Russian National Library, Gr. 312	Saint Petersburg	Russia	
ℓ 1019	11th	Gospels^{esk}	αω	227	Patriarchate of Jerusalem, Saba 360	Jerusalem	Israel	CSNTM
ℓ 1019	11th	Gospels^{esk}	αω	2	Russian National Library, Gr. 284	Saint Petersburg	Russia	
ℓ 1020	12th	Gospels^{P}	αω	8	Patriarchate of Jerusalem, Saba 605, fol. 74-81	Jerusalem	Israel	CSNTM
ℓ 1021	12th	Gospels + Apostles^{esk}	αω	182	Patriarchate of Jerusalem, Saba 612	Jerusalem	Israel	CSNTM
ℓ 1022	1535	Gospels^{e}	αω	298	Patriarchate of Jerusalem, Stavru 9	Jerusalem	Israel	CSNTM
ℓ 1023	11th	†Gospels^{esk}	αω	370	Patriarchate of Jerusalem, Stavru 26	Jerusalem	Israel	CSNTM
ℓ 1024	11th	†Gospels^{esk}	αω	397	Patriarchate of Jerusalem, Stavru 44	Jerusalem	Israel	CSNTM
ℓ 1025	13th	†Gospels^{esk}	αω	101	Patriarchate of Jerusalem, Stavru 51	Jerusalem	Israel	CSNTM
ℓ 1026	1647	Gospels^{e}	αω	1	Chester Beatty Library, CBL W 143.4.13	Dublin	Ireland	CSNTM
ℓ 1026	1647	Gospels^{e}	αω	261	Patriarchate of Jerusalem, Anastaseos 1	Jerusalem	Israel	CSNTM
ℓ 1027	1610	Gospels^{e}	αω	14	Chester Beatty Library, CBL W 143.4.4–12, 14, 15; 143.5.1, 2, 4	Dublin	Ireland	CSNTM
ℓ 1027	1610	Gospels^{e}	αω	294	Patriarchate of Jerusalem, Anastaseos 2	Jerusalem	Israel	CSNTM
ℓ 1027	1610	Gospels^{e}	αω	1	University Library, Collect. Dortmond 140	Amsterdam	Netherlands	
ℓ 1028	1633	Gospels^{e}	αω	234	Patriarchate of Jerusalem, Anastaseos 3	Jerusalem	Israel	CSNTM
ℓ 1029	1594	Gospels^{e}	αω	425	Walters Art Museum, Ms. W. 535	Baltimore, MD	United States	WAM
ℓ 1030	1596	Gospels^{e}	αω	1	Chester Beatty Library, CBL W 143.5.3	Dublin	Ireland	CSNTM
ℓ 1030	1596	Gospels^{e}	αω	512	Patriarchate of Jerusalem, Anastaseos 5	Jerusalem	Israel	CSNTM
ℓ 1030	1596	Gospels^{e}	αω	4	Morgan Library & Museum, MS M. 654.1-4	New York, NY	United States	
ℓ 1030	1596	Gospels^{e}	αω	2	Princeton University Art Museum, y1954-67 and y1954-68	Princeton , NJ	United States	
ℓ 1030	1596	Gospels^{e}	αω	1	University of Toronto Malcove Collection, MS 82.446	Toronto	Canada	
ℓ 1031	16th	Gospels^{e}	αω	3	Chester Beatty Library, CBL W 143.4.1, 2, 3	Dublin	Ireland	CSNTM
ℓ 1031	16th	Gospels^{e}	αω	265	Patriarchate of Jerusalem, Monê Abraham 7	Jerusalem	Israel	CSNTM
ℓ 1032	15th	Gospels^{e}	αω	440	Patriarchate of Jerusalem, Anastaseos 8	Jerusalem	Israel	CSNTM
ℓ 1033	1152	Gospels^{e}	αω	233	Patriarchate of Jerusalem, Anastaseos 9	Jerusalem	Israel	CSNTM
ℓ 1034	16th	Gospels^{e}	αω	220	Patriarchate of Jerusalem, Anastaseos 10	Jerusalem	Israel	CSNTM
ℓ 1035	13th	Gospels^{e}	αω	252	Patriarchate of Jerusalem, Anastaseos 11	Jerusalem	Israel	CSNTM
ℓ 1036	1596	Gospels^{e}	αω	446	Patriarchate of Jerusalem, Skevophylakion 1	Jerusalem	Israel	
ℓ 1037	1642	Gospels^{e}	αω	343	Patriarchate of Jerusalem, Skevophylakion 3	Jerusalem	Israel	
ℓ 1038	12th	Gospels^{esk}	αω	304	Patriarchate of Jerusalem, Nea Syllogi (Photiu), 1	Jerusalem	Israel	CSNTM
ℓ 1039	11th	Gospels^{e}	αω	322	Patriarchate of Jerusalem, Nea Syllogi (Photiu), 2	Jerusalem	Israel	CSNTM
ℓ 1040	13th	Gospels^{P}	αω	13	Patriarchate of Jerusalem, Nea Syllogi (Photiu), 53	Jerusalem	Israel	CSNTM
[ℓ 1041]								
[ℓ 1042]								
ℓ 1043	5th	Gospels^{P}	ΑΩ	5	Austrian National Library, Pap. G 2324	Vienna	Austria	CSNTM
ℓ 1044	10th	Gospels^{sel}	ΑΩ	156	Central University Library, Ms. IV. 34	Iasi	Romania	
ℓ 1045	16th	Gospels^{sk}	αω	200	Owner Unknown			
ℓ 1046	1542	Gospels + Apostles^{Lit}	αω	211	Vatican Library, Reg. gr. Pii II 34	Vatican City	Vatican City	INTF
ℓ 1047	1620	Gospels	αω	89	National Library of Greece	Athens	Greece	
ℓ 1048	11th	Gospels^{P}	αω	2	Patriarchate of Jerusalem, Saba 572	Jerusalem	Israel	CSNTM
ℓ 1049	12th	†Gospels^{e}	αω	229	Panachrantos Monastery, 1	Andros	Greece	
ℓ 1050	12th	Gospels^{esk}	αω	184	Panachrantos Monastery, 3	Andros	Greece	
ℓ 1051	1522	†Gospels^{esk}	αω	296	Panachrantos Monastery, 15	Andros	Greece	
ℓ 1052	16th	Gospels + Apostles^{e}	αω	385	Monastery of Saint John the Theologian, 557	Patmos	Greece	
ℓ 1053	13th	Luke 24:25-35; John 1:35-50	αω	2	British Library, Add MS 19392B	London	United Kingdom	BL
ℓ 1054	1595	Gospels^{e}	αω	273	Stavronikita Monastery, 97	Mount Athos	Greece	
ℓ 1055	14th	Gospels^{e}	αω	408	Pantokratoros Monastery, 10	Mount Athos	Greece	
ℓ 1056	13th	Gospels^{e}	αω	211	Pantokratoros Monastery, 29	Mount Athos	Greece	LoC
ℓ 1057	14th	Gospels^{sk}	αω	246	Pantokratoros Monastery, 35	Mount Athos	Greece	
ℓ 1058	13th	†Gospels^{e}	αω	242	Pantokratoros Monastery, 36	Mount Athos	Greece	
ℓ 1059	14th	†Gospels^{esk}	αω	222	Pantokratoros Monastery, 55	Mount Athos	Greece	
ℓ 1060	14th	Gospels^{P}	αω	25	Pantokratoros Monastery, 158, fol. 1-25	Mount Athos	Greece	
ℓ 1061	17th	Gospels + Apostles^{Lit}	αω	20	Owner Unknown			
ℓ 1062	15th	Gospels + Apostles^{Lit-P}	αω	298	National Library of Greece, NLG 848	Athens	Greece	CSNTM
ℓ 1063	15th	Gospels + Apostles^{Lit-P}	αω	244	National Library of Greece, 851	Athens	Greece	
[ℓ 1064]=ℓ 1890								
ℓ 1065	11th	Gospels	αω	141	Benaki Museum, TA 144	Athens	Greece	CSNTM
ℓ 1066	11th	†Gospels^{esk}	αω	261	Tenri Central Library, 193. 5-i 28 C 113	Tenri, Nara	Japan	
ℓ 1067	11th	Gospels^{e}	αω	297	Benaki Museum, TA 316 (protheke 30,3)	Athens	Greece	CSNTM
ℓ 1068	11th	Gospels	αω	399	Center for Slavic & Byzantine Studies, D. gr. 157	Sofia	Bulgaria	
ℓ 1069	9th	Gospels	αω	249	Center for Slavic & Byzantine Studies, D. gr. 272	Sofia	Bulgaria	
ℓ 1070	12th/14th	Gospels	αω P^{O}	184	Center for Slavic & Byzantine Studies, D. gr. 150	Sofia	Bulgaria	
ℓ 1071	13th/ 14th	Gospels	αω P^{O}	302	Center for Slavic & Byzantine Studies, D gr. 350	Sofia	Bulgaria	
ℓ 1072	16th	Gospels	αω	185	Center for Slavic & Byzantine Studies, D. gr. 018	Sofia	Bulgaria	
ℓ 1073	10th	†Gospels^{esk}	αω	161	Great Lavra Monastery, A' 30	Mount Athos	Greece	INTF
ℓ 1074	1290	†Gospels^{esk}	αω	123	Great Lavra Monastery, A' 43	Mount Athos	Greece	
ℓ 1075	1032	†Gospels^{esk}	αω	279	Great Lavra Monastery, A' 53	Mount Athos	Greece	INTF
ℓ 1076	10th	†Gospels^{esk}	ΑΩ	212	Great Lavra Monastery, A' 55	Mount Athos	Greece	INTF
ℓ 1077	10th	†Gospels^{esk}	ΑΩ	199	Great Lavra Monastery, A' 56	Mount Athos	Greece	INTF
ℓ 1078	1240	Gospels^{esk}	αω	158	Great Lavra Monastery, A' 71	Mount Athos	Greece	
ℓ 1079	14th	Gospels^{e}	αω	294	Great Lavra Monastery, A' 72	Mount Athos	Greece	INTF
ℓ 1080	13th	†Gospels^{esk}	αω	119	Great Lavra Monastery, A' 80	Mount Athos	Greece	
ℓ 1081	12th	†Gospels^{esk}	αω	173	Great Lavra Monastery, A' 81	Mount Athos	Greece	
ℓ 1082	10th	Gospels^{(e)sk}	ΑΩ	194	Great Lavra Monastery, A' 82	Mount Athos	Greece	INTF
ℓ 1083	13th	Gospels^{esk}	αω	265	Great Lavra Monastery, A' 83	Mount Athos	Greece	
ℓ 1084	1292	Gospels^{e}	αω	288	Great Lavra Monastery, A' 84	Mount Athos	Greece	
ℓ 1085	14th	†Gospels^{esk}	αω	188	Great Lavra Monastery, A' 85	Mount Athos	Greece	
ℓ 1086	11th	†Gospels^{esk}	ΑΩ	326	Great Lavra Monastery, A' 86	Mount Athos	Greece	INTF
ℓ 1087	1307	Apostles	αω	236	Center for Slavic & Byzantine Studies, D. gr. 029	Sofia	Bulgaria	
ℓ 1088	16th	Apostles	αω	216	Center for Slavic & Byzantine Studies, D. gr. 332	Sofia	Bulgaria	
ℓ 1089	11th/12th	Apostles	αω	210	Center for Slavic & Byzantine Studies, D. gr. 196	Sofia	Bulgaria	
ℓ 1090	1505	Apostles	αω	?	Owner Unknown			
ℓ 1091	10th	†Gospels^{esk}	ΑΩ	304	Great Lavra Monastery, A' 92	Mount Athos	Greece	INTF
ℓ 1092	13th	Gospels^{e}	αω	190	Great Lavra Monastery, A' 93	Mount Athos	Greece	INTF
ℓ 1093	12th	Gospels^{esk}	αω	231	Great Lavra Monastery, A' 94	Mount Athos	Greece	
ℓ 1094	13th	Gospels^{e}	αω	207	Great Lavra Monastery, A' 95	Mount Athos	Greece	
ℓ 1095	13th	†Gospels^{esk}	αω	86	Great Lavra Monastery, A' 96	Mount Athos	Greece	
ℓ 1096	10th	†Gospels^{esk}	ΑΩ	222	Great Lavra Monastery, A' 97	Mount Athos	Greece	INTF
ℓ 1097	13th	Gospels^{e}	αω	295	Great Lavra Monastery, A' 98	Mount Athos	Greece	INTF
ℓ 1098	12th	Gospels^{esk}	αω	283	Great Lavra Monastery, A' 100	Mount Athos	Greece	
ℓ 1099	13th	Gospels^{e}	αω	287	Great Lavra Monastery, A' 101	Mount Athos	Greece	
ℓ 1100	10th	†Gospels^{esk}	ΑΩ	188	Great Lavra Monastery, A' 102	Mount Athos	Greece	INTF

[top]

=== Lectionaries 1101–1200 ===
#	Date	Contents	Script	Pages	Institution	City, State	Country	Images
ℓ 1101	12th	Gospels^{sel}	αω	182	Great Lavra Monastery, A' 103	Mount Athos	Greece	
ℓ 1102	13th	Gospels^{e}	αω	339	Great Lavra Monastery, A' 105	Mount Athos	Greece	
ℓ 1103	13th	†Gospels^{esk}	αω	195	Great Lavra Monastery, A' 106	Mount Athos	Greece	
ℓ 1104	13th	Gospels^{esk}	αω	168	Great Lavra Monastery, A' 107	Mount Athos	Greece	
ℓ 1105	10th	Gospels^{P}	ΑΩ	53	Great Lavra Monastery, A' 108	Mount Athos	Greece	
ℓ 1106	12th	†Gospels^{esk}	αω	189	Great Lavra Monastery, A' 110	Mount Athos	Greece	
ℓ 1107	14th	Gospels^{e}	αω	402	Great Lavra Monastery, A' 111	Mount Athos	Greece	
ℓ 1108	14th	Gospels^{e}	αω	300	Great Lavra Monastery, A' 112	Mount Athos	Greece	
ℓ 1109	1367	Gospels^{e}	αω	351	Great Lavra Monastery, A' 113	Mount Athos	Greece	
ℓ 1110	14th	†Gospels^{esk}	αω	232	Great Lavra Monastery, A' 114	Mount Athos	Greece	
ℓ 1111	14th	Gospels^{esk}	αω	273	Great Lavra Monastery, A' 115	Mount Athos	Greece	
ℓ 1112	13th	Gospels^{e}	αω	125	Great Lavra Monastery, A' 116"	Mount Athos	Greece	
ℓ 1113	12th	Gospels^{e}	αω	273	Great Lavra Monastery, A' 117	Mount Athos	Greece	
ℓ 1114	13th	Gospels^{e}	αω	397	Great Lavra Monastery, A' 118	Mount Athos	Greece	
ℓ 1115	14th	†Gospels^{esk}	αω	293	Great Lavra Monastery, A' 119	Mount Athos	Greece	
ℓ 1116	14th	†Gospels^{esk}	αω	217	Great Lavra Monastery, A' 120	Mount Athos	Greece	
ℓ 1117	12th	†Gospels^{esk}	αω	166	Great Lavra Monastery, Γ' 110	Mount Athos	Greece	
ℓ 1118	12th	†Gospels^{esk}	αω	155	Great Lavra Monastery, A' 70	Mount Athos	Greece	
ℓ 1119	14th	†Gospels^{esk}	αω	126	Formerly, Skete of Saint Andrew, 704 (destroyed)	Mount Athos	Greece	
ℓ 1120	13th/14th	†Gospels^{esk}	αω	164	University Classical Seminar, Ms. 75	Thessaloniki	Greece	
ℓ 1120	13th/14th	†Gospels^{esk}	αω	1	Columbia University, Rare Book and Manuscript Library, Plimpton MS 11	New York, NY	United States	CSNTM
ℓ 1121	13th	†Gospels^{e}	αω	250	Formerly, Skete of Saint Andrew, 756 (destroyed)	Mount Athos	Greece	
ℓ 1122	14th	†Gospels^{esk}	αω	213	Formerly, Skete of Saint Andrew, 778 (destroyed)	Mount Athos	Greece	
ℓ 1123	14th	Apostles^{e}	αω	268	Vatopedi Monastery, 854	Mount Athos	Greece	
ℓ 1124	14th	Apostles^{e}	αω	315	Vatopedi Monastery, 855	Mount Athos	Greece	
ℓ 1125	14th	Apostles^{e}	αω	254	Vatopedi Monastery, 856	Mount Athos	Greece	
ℓ 1126	12th	Gospels + Apostles^{sel}	αω	283	Vatopedi Monastery, 866	Mount Athos	Greece	INTF
ℓ 1127	12th	Gospels^{e}	αω	277	Vatopedi Monastery, 879	Mount Athos	Greece	
ℓ 1128	13th	Gospels^{e}	αω	401	Vatopedi Monastery, 880	Mount Athos	Greece	
ℓ 1129	13th	Gospels^{esk}	αω	282	Vatopedi Monastery, 881	Mount Athos	Greece	
ℓ 1130	13th	Gospels^{esk}	αω	237	Vatopedi Monastery, 883	Mount Athos	Greece	
ℓ 1131	13th	Gospels^{e}	αω	235	Vatopedi Monastery, 903	Mount Athos	Greece	INTF
ℓ 1132	1353	Gospels^{e}	αω	463	Vatopedi Monastery, 904	Mount Athos	Greece	
ℓ 1133	13th	†Gospels^{esk}	αω	187	Vatopedi Monastery, 906	Mount Athos	Greece	
ℓ 1134	12th	Gospels^{esk}	αω	165	Vatopedi Monastery, 907	Mount Athos	Greece	
ℓ 1135	14th	Gospels^{e}	αω	337	Vatopedi Monastery, 908	Mount Athos	Greece	INTF
ℓ 1136	13th	†Gospels^{esk}	αω	204	Vatopedi Monastery, 909	Mount Athos	Greece	
ℓ 1137	13th	Gospels^{esk}	αω	156	Vatopedi Monastery, 911	Mount Athos	Greece	
ℓ 1138	13th	†Gospels^{e}	αω	212	Vatopedi Monastery, 912	Mount Athos	Greece	
ℓ 1139	16th	Gospels + Apostles^{sel}	αω	352	Vatopedi Monastery, 916	Mount Athos	Greece	
ℓ 1140	12th	Gospels^{esk}	αω	168	Vatopedi Monastery, 924	Mount Athos	Greece	
ℓ 1141	1105	Gospels + Apostles^{e}	αω	216	Vatopedi Monastery, 925	Mount Athos	Greece	CSNTM
ℓ 1142	14th	Gospels + Apostles^{Lit}	αω	332	Vatopedi Monastery, 984	Mount Athos	Greece	
ℓ 1143	12th	†Gospels^{sk}	αω	104	Vatopedi Monastery, 969	Mount Athos	Greece	
ℓ 1144	1503	Apostles	αω	?	Owner Unknown			
ℓ 1145	16th	†Gospels^{esk}	αω	154	Dionysiou Monastery, 588	Mount Athos	Greece	
ℓ 1146	12th	†Apostles^{e}	αω	82	Koutloumousiou Monastery, 90 β'	Mount Athos	Greece	
ℓ 1147	16th	Gospels^{e}	αω	248	Koutloumousiou Monastery, 288	Mount Athos	Greece	
ℓ 1148	1562	Gospels^{e}	αω	245	Koutloumousiou Monastery, 289	Mount Athos	Greece	
ℓ 1149	1576	Gospels^{e}	αω	250	Koutloumousiou Monastery, 291	Mount Athos	Greece	
ℓ 1150	1697	Gospels^{e}	αω	261	Koutloumousiou Monastery, 293	Mount Athos	Greece	INTF
ℓ 1151	14th	†Apostles^{esk}	αω	93	Great Lavra Monastery, B' 41	Mount Athos	Greece	
ℓ 1152	13th	†Apostles^{esk}	αω	135	Great Lavra Monastery, B' 62	Mount Athos	Greece	
ℓ 1153	14th	Apostles^{e}	αω	287	Great Lavra Monastery, B' 74, fol. 1-287	Mount Athos	Greece	INTF
ℓ 1154	12th	†Apostles^{e}	αω	143	Great Lavra Monastery, B' 79	Mount Athos	Greece	INTF
ℓ 1155	14th	Apostles^{esk}	αω	216	Great Lavra Monastery, B' 85	Mount Athos	Greece	
ℓ 1156	14th	†Apostles	αω	268	Great Lavra Monastery, B' 90	Mount Athos	Greece	INTF
ℓ 1157	13th	Gospels + Apostles^{ek}	αω	179	Great Lavra Monastery, Γ' 6	Mount Athos	Greece	
ℓ 1158	15th	Gospels + Apostles^{esk}	αω	230	Great Lavra Monastery, Γ' 85	Mount Athos	Greece	
ℓ 1159	1331	Apostles^{e}	αω	277	Great Lavra Monastery, Γ' 123	Mount Athos	Greece	INTF
ℓ 1160	13th	†Gospels^{esk}	αω	137	Koutloumousiou Monastery, 648	Mount Athos	Greece	
ℓ 1161	15th	Gospels^{k-K}	αω	234	Great Lavra Monastery, E' 133	Mount Athos	Greece	
ℓ 1162	15th	Gospels^{e}	αω	322	Great Lavra Monastery, E' 138	Mount Athos	Greece	
ℓ 1163	14th	Apostles^{P}	αω	25	Koutloumousiou Monastery, 284, fol. 270-294 (fol. 1-269: 1062)	Mount Athos	Greece	
ℓ 1164	1564	Apostles^{esk}	αω	135	Ecumenical Patriarchate, Chalki, Kamariotissis, 88	Istanbul	Turkey	
ℓ 1165	16th	Gospels^{e}	αω	432	Great Lavra Monastery, Ω' 130	Mount Athos	Greece	
ℓ 1166	1620	Gospels^{esk}	αω	237	Great Lavra Monastery, Ω' 140	Mount Athos	Greece	
ℓ 1167	1653	Gospels^{sk}	αω	162	Great Lavra Monastery, Ω' 142	Mount Athos	Greece	
ℓ 1168	1624	Gospels^{e}	αω	451	Great Lavra Monastery, Ω' 145	Mount Athos	Greece	
ℓ 1169	1654	Gospels^{e}	αω	217	Great Lavra Monastery, Ω' 146	Mount Athos	Greece	
ℓ 1170	17th	†Gospels + Apostles^{esk}	αω	93	Great Lavra Monastery, Λ' 110	Mount Athos	Greece	
ℓ 1171	16th	Apostles^{esk}	αω	161	Great Lavra Monastery, Λ' 124	Mount Athos	Greece	
ℓ 1172	1354	Gospels + Apostles^{sel}	αω	160	Great Lavra Monastery, Λ' 127	Mount Athos	Greece	
ℓ 1173	15th	†Apostles^{esk}	αω	167	Great Lavra Monastery, Λ' 130	Mount Athos	Greece	
ℓ 1174	16th	†Apostles^{esk}	αω	105	Great Lavra Monastery, Λ' 132	Mount Athos	Greece	
ℓ 1175	16th	Apostles^{sk}	αω	305	Great Lavra Monastery, Λ' 133	Mount Athos	Greece	
ℓ 1176	14th	Gospels^{esk}	αω	164	Great Lavra Monastery, Λ' 177	Mount Athos	Greece	
ℓ 1177	14th	†Apostles^{e}	αω	93	Great Lavra Monastery, K' 80, fol. 1-93	Mount Athos	Greece	
ℓ 1178	11th	Apostles^{e}	αω	298	Monastery of Saint John the Theologian, 11	Patmos	Greece	INTF
ℓ 1179	15th	†Apostles^{esk}	αω	261	Great Lavra Monastery, H' 66	Mount Athos	Greece	
ℓ 1180	15th	†Gospels^{esk}	αω	234	Great Lavra Monastery, H' 164	Mount Athos	Greece	
ℓ 1181	1654	Apostles^{e}	αω	251	Great Lavra Monastery, H' 171	Mount Athos	Greece	
ℓ 1182	14th	Gospels^{esk}	αω	270	St. Panteleimon Monastery, 12	Mount Athos	Greece	
ℓ 1183	12th	Gospels^{esk}	αω	175	St. Panteleimon Monastery, 31	Mount Athos	Greece	
ℓ 1184	14th	†Gospels^{esk}	αω	87	St. Panteleimon Monastery, 38	Mount Athos	Greece	
ℓ 1185	13th	Gospels^{P}	αω	24	St. Panteleimon Monastery, 39	Mount Athos	Greece	
ℓ 1186	14th	†Gospels^{esk}	αω	129	St. Panteleimon Monastery, 63	Mount Athos	Greece	
ℓ 1187	13th	†Gospels^{e}	αω	117	St. Panteleimon Monastery, 64	Mount Athos	Greece	
ℓ 1188	14th	Apostles^{e}	αω	255	St. Panteleimon Monastery, 67	Mount Athos	Greece	INTF
ℓ 1189	14th	†Apostles^{esk}	αω	128	St. Panteleimon Monastery, 69	Mount Athos	Greece	
ℓ 1190	10th	Gospels^{P}	ΑΩ	2	St. Panteleimon Monastery, 96, 1	Mount Athos	Greece	
ℓ 1191	12th	Gospels^{P}	αω	5	St. Panteleimon Monastery, 97,1	Mount Athos	Greece	
ℓ 1192	11th	Apostles^{P}	αω	1	St. Panteleimon Monastery, 98 A' 1	Mount Athos	Greece	
ℓ 1193	9th	Gospels^{P}	ΑΩ P^{U}	18	St. Panteleimon Monastery, 100	Mount Athos	Greece	
ℓ 1194	15th	Gospels^{e}	αω	286	St. Panteleimon Monastery, 102	Mount Athos	Greece	
ℓ 1195	16th	Apostles^{esk}	αω	140	St. Panteleimon Monastery, 103	Mount Athos	Greece	
ℓ 1196	16th	Apostles^{e}	αω	269	St. Panteleimon Monastery, 104	Mount Athos	Greece	
ℓ 1197	15th	Apostles^{e}	αω	262	St. Panteleimon Monastery, 105	Mount Athos	Greece	
ℓ 1198	15th	Apostles^{esk}	αω	188	St. Panteleimon Monastery, 106	Mount Athos	Greece	
ℓ 1199	1547	Apostles^{esk}	αω	144	St. Panteleimon Monastery, 107	Mount Athos	Greece	
ℓ 1200	15th	Gospels^{e}	αω	491	St. Panteleimon Monastery, 216	Mount Athos	Greece	

[top]

=== Lectionaries 1201–1300 ===
#	Date	Contents	Script	Pages	Institution	City, State	Country	Images
ℓ 1201	15th	Gospels^{sk}	αω	202	St. Panteleimon Monastery, 761	Mount Athos	Greece	
ℓ 1202	1577	Apostles^{P}	αω	1	Philotheou Monastery, 1840 (76)	Mount Athos	Greece	
ℓ 1203	16th	†Apostles^{e}	αω	?	Xenophontos Monastery, 223	Mount Athos	Greece	
ℓ 1204	11th	Gospels^{P}	αω	50	National Archives of Albania, Kod. Br. 6	Tirana	Albania	CSNTM
[ℓ 1205]								
[ℓ 1206]								
ℓ 1207	1181	Gospels	αω	40	National Archives of Albania, Kod. Br. 21	Tirana	Albania	CSNTM
ℓ 1208	?	Gospels	αω	204	Owner unknown			
[ℓ 1209]								
ℓ 1210	1588	Gospels + Apostles^{Lit}	αω	139	Leimonos Monastery, 100	Kalloni, Lesbos	Greece	
ℓ 1211	15th	Apostles^{esk}	αω	139	Leimonos Monastery, 137	Kalloni, Lesbos	Greece	LM
ℓ 1212	1562	Gospels^{P}	αω	184	Leimonos Monastery, 146	Kalloni, Lesbos	Greece	
ℓ 1213	17th	Gospels^{Lit-P}	αω	192	Leimonos Monastery, 221	Kalloni, Lesbos	Greece	
ℓ 1214	10th	†Gospels^{esk}	ΑΩ P^{U}	159	National Library of Greece, NLG 2112	Athens	Greece	CSNTM
ℓ 1214	10th	†Gospels^{esk}	ΑΩ P^{U}	159	National Library of Greece, NLG 2112	Athens	Greece	CSNTM
ℓ 1215	15th	Gospels^{esk}	αω	279	National Library of Greece, NLG 2114	Athens	Greece	CSNTM
ℓ 1216	9th	Gospels^{esk}	ΑΩ	?	Owner Unknown			
ℓ 1217	12th	Gospels^{e}	αω	325	Byzantine and Christian Museum, 162	Athens	Greece	
ℓ 1218	14th	Apostles^{e}	αω	247	Vlatades Monastery, 2	Thessaloniki	Greece	
ℓ 1219	13th	Gospels^{esk}	αω	139	Vlatades Monastery, 24	Thessaloniki	Greece	
ℓ 1220	1281	Gospels^{e}	αω	202	Vlatades Monastery, 45	Thessaloniki	Greece	
ℓ 1221	14th	†Apostles^{e}	αω	155	Vlatades Monastery, 51	Thessaloniki	Greece	
ℓ 1222	11th	Gospels^{esk}	αω	174	National Library of Greece, NLG 2552	Athens	Greece	CSNTM
ℓ 1222	11th	Gospels^{esk}	αω	1	Walters Art Museum, Ms. W. 530a	Baltimore, MD	United States	WAM
ℓ 1223	13th	†Gospels^{e}	αω	353	National Library of Greece, NLG 2540	Athens	Greece	CSNTM
ℓ 1224	12th	†Gospels^{e}	αω	322	National Library of Greece, NLG 2513	Athens	Greece	CSNTM
ℓ 1225	14th	Gospels^{e}	αω	359	National Library of Greece, NLG 2546	Athens	Greece	CSNTM
ℓ 1226	14th	†Gospels^{e}	αω	122	National Library of Greece, NLG 2549	Athens	Greece	CSNTM
ℓ 1227	12th	Apostles^{e}	αω	235	National Library of Greece, NLG 2551	Athens	Greece	CSNTM
ℓ 1228	12th	Gospels^{esk}	αω	201	National Library of Greece, NLG 2525	Athens	Greece	CSNTM
ℓ 1228	12th	Gospels^{esk}	αω	201	National Library of Greece, NLG 2525	Athens	Greece	CSNTM
ℓ 1229	12th	†Gospels^{esk}	αω	200	National Library of Greece, NLG 2557	Athens	Greece	CSNTM
ℓ 1230	1388	Apostles^{e}	αω	256	National Library of Greece, NLG 2532	Athens	Greece	CSNTM
ℓ 1231	10th	Gospels^{esk}	αω	174	Princeton University Libraries, Scheide M2	Princeton, NJ	United States	
ℓ 1232	14th	†Gospels^{esk}	αω	272	National Library of Greece, NLG 2398, fol. 3-274	Athens	Greece	CSNTM
ℓ 1232	14th	†Gospels^{esk}	αω	272	National Library of Greece, NLG 2398, fol. 3-274	Athens	Greece	CSNTM
ℓ 1233	13th	†Gospels + Apostles^{esk}	αω	310	National Library of Greece, NLG 2493	Athens	Greece	CSNTM
ℓ 1234	14th	Gospels^{sel}	αω P^{O}	11	British Library, Add MS 32643, ff. 185–195	London	United Kingdom	BL
ℓ 1235	14th	†Gospels^{esk}	αω P^{O}	159	National Library of Greece, NLG 2112	Athens	Greece	CSNTM
ℓ 1235	14th	†Gospels^{esk}	αω P^{O}	159	National Library of Greece, NLG 2112	Athens	Greece	CSNTM
ℓ 1236	13th	Gospels^{e}	αω	295	National Library of Greece, NLG 4173	Athens	Greece	
ℓ 1237	12th	Gospels	αω	189	Center for Slavic & Byzantine Studies, D. gr. 133	Sofia	Bulgaria	
ℓ 1238	11th/12th	Gospels	αω	233	Center for Slavic & Byzantine Studies, D. gr. 204	Sofia	Bulgaria	
ℓ 1239	14th	Gospels	αω	128	Center for Slavic & Byzantine Studies, D. gr. 337	Sofia	Bulgaria	
ℓ 1240	11th	Gospels	αω	?	National Historical Museum, Gr. 1	Sofia	Bulgaria	
ℓ 1241	14th	Gospels	αω	314	Center for Slavic & Byzantine Studies, D. gr. 054	Sofia	Bulgaria	
ℓ 1242	12th	Apostles	αω	213	Center for Slavic & Byzantine Studies, D. gr. 091	Sofia	Bulgaria	
ℓ 1243	13th	Apostles	αω	?	Owner Unknown			
ℓ 1244	13th	Gospels	αω	?	Owner Unknown			
ℓ 1245	14th	Gospels	αω	190	Center for Slavic & Byzantine Studies, D. gr. 092	Sofia	Bulgaria	
ℓ 1246	13th	Apostles	αω	?	Owner Unknown			
ℓ 1247	13th	Gospels	αω	?	Owner Unknown			
ℓ 1248	11th	Gospels	αω	210	Center for Slavic & Byzantine Studies, D. gr. 235	Sofia	Bulgaria	
ℓ 1249	11th	†Gospels^{e}	αω	189	Center for Slavic & Byzantine Studies, D. gr. 228	Sofia	Bulgaria	
ℓ 1250	13th	Apostles	αω	139	Center for Slavic & Byzantine Studies, D. gr. 293	Sofia	Bulgaria	
ℓ 1251	13th	Apostles	αω	101	Center for Slavic & Byzantine Studies, D. gr. 214	Sofia	Bulgaria	
ℓ 1252	11th	Apostles	αω	133	Center for Slavic & Byzantine Studies, D. gr. 165	Sofia	Bulgaria	
ℓ 1253	16th	Apostles	αω	365	Center for Slavic & Byzantine Studies, D. gr. 264	Sofia	Bulgaria	
ℓ 1254	16th	Apostles	αω	134	Center for Slavic & Byzantine Studies, D. gr. 304	Sofia	Bulgaria	
ℓ 1255	16th	Apostles	αω	302	Center for Slavic & Byzantine Studies, D. gr. 263	Sofia	Bulgaria	
ℓ 1256	13th	Gospels^{esk}	αω	186	University Library, Gr. 73	Uppsala	Sweden	UU
ℓ 1257	13th	Gospels	αω	?	Owner Unknown			
ℓ 1258	11th	Apostles	αω	227	Center for Slavic & Byzantine Studies, D. gr. 216	Sofia	Bulgaria	
ℓ 1259	12th	†Gospels^{e}	αω	123	University of Birmingham Cadbury Research Library, Braithwaite 4	Birmingham	United Kingdom	
[ℓ 1260]								
ℓ 1261	11th	Gospels^{esk}	αω	319	National Library of Turkey, Gr. 03	Ankara	Turkey	
ℓ 1262	11th	†Gospels	αω	250	National Library of Turkey, Gr. 06	Ankara	Turkey	
ℓ 1263	17th	Apostles	αω	133	Owner Unknown			
ℓ 1264	13th	†Gospels^{esk}	αω	133	Queriniana Library, A. III. 10	Brescia	Italy	
ℓ 1265	1257	Gospels^{e}	αω	209	Sainte-Geneviève Library, A. III. 12	Paris	France	
ℓ 1266	12th	†Gospels^{esk}	αω	462	Queriniana Library, D. II. 14	Brescia	Italy	
ℓ 1267	11th	Gospels^{P}	ΑΩ	8	Saint Catherine's Monastery, Harris App. 12; N. E. Sp. MG 8	Sinai	Egypt	CSNTM
ℓ 1268	11th	Gospels^{P}	ΑΩ	2	Saint Catherine's Monastery, Harris App. 13	Sinai	Egypt	CSNTM
ℓ 1269	10th	Gospels^{P}	ΑΩ	6	Saint Catherine's Monastery, Harris App. 14	Sinai	Egypt	CSNTM
ℓ 1270	10th	Gospels^{P}	ΑΩ	2	Saint Catherine's Monastery, Harris App. 15	Sinai	Egypt	CSNTM
[ℓ 1271]								
ℓ 1272	10th	Gospels^{P}	ΑΩ P^{U}	1	Saint Catherine's Monastery, Harris App. 19	Sinai	Egypt	CSNTM
[ℓ 1273]								
ℓ 1274	11th	Gospels^{esk}	αω	226	Owner Unknown			
ℓ 1275	12th	†Gospels^{e}	αω	218	Historical Archives, 2	Rhodos	Greece	
ℓ 1276	9th	Gospels^{P}	αω P^{U}	5 Frg	Cambridge University Library, Taylor-Schechter Collection 16, 93	Cambridge	United Kingdom	
ℓ 1277	15th	Gospels + Apostles^{sk}	αω	75	Dionysiou Monastery, 319, fol. 245-319	Mount Athos	Greece	INTF
ℓ 1278	16th	Apostles^{e}	αω	190	National Library of Greece, 2113	Athens	Greece	
ℓ 1279	11th	Apostles^{e}	αω	253	St. Panteleimon Monastery, 86	Mount Athos	Greece	
ℓ 1280	1474	Apostles^{e}	αω	223	National Library of Greece, NLG 2117	Athens	Greece	CSNTM
ℓ 1281	1454	Apostles^{e}	αω	399	Saint Catherine's Monastery, Gr. 296	Sinai	Egypt	CSNTM
ℓ 1282	1515	Apostles^{e}	αω	326	Saint Catherine's Monastery, Gr. 297	Sinai	Egypt	CSNTM
ℓ 1283	1551	Apostles^{e}	αω	292	Saint Catherine's Monastery, Gr. 298	Sinai	Egypt	CSNTM
ℓ 1284	16th	Apostles^{e}	αω	205	Saint Catherine's Monastery, Gr. 299	Sinai	Egypt	CSNTM
ℓ 1285	14th	Apostles^{Lit}	αω	55	Exarchist Monastery of Saint Mary, G. b. 18	Grottaferrata	Italy	
ℓ 1286	11th	Apostles^{P}	αω	1	Exarchist Monastery of Saint Mary, A. d. 5, fol. 162	Grottaferrata	Italy	
ℓ 1287	13th	Apostles^{Lit}	αω P^{O}	36	Exarchist Monastery of Saint Mary, A. d. 6	Grottaferrata	Italy	
ℓ 1288	12th	Apostles^{Lit}	αω	118	Exarchist Monastery of Saint Mary, A. d. 9	Grottaferrata	Italy	
ℓ 1289	1544	Apostles^{sel}	αω	18	Vatican Library, Reg. gr. 70	Vatican City	Vatican City	
ℓ 1290	12th	Apostles^{e}	αω	97	Panagia Hozoviotissa Monastery	Amorgos	Greece	
ℓ 1291	14th	†Apostles^{e}	αω	194	Patriarchate of Jerusalem, Epiph. of the Jordan 1	Jerusalem	Israel	CSNTM
ℓ 1292	14th	†Apostles^{esk}	αω	75	Patriarchate of Jerusalem, Epiph. of the Jordan 6	Jerusalem	Israel	CSNTM
ℓ 1293	15th	†Apostles^{e}	αω	90	Patriarchate of Jerusalem, Epiph. of the Jordan 7	Jerusalem	Israel	CSNTM
ℓ 1294	14th	Apostles^{esk}	αω	296	Patriarchate of Jerusalem, Taphu 285	Jerusalem	Israel	CSNTM
ℓ 1295	13th	Apostles^{esk}	αω	271	Patriarchate of Jerusalem, Saba 85	Jerusalem	Israel	CSNTM
ℓ 1296	1556	Apostles^{e}	αω	295	Patriarchate of Jerusalem, Saba 145	Jerusalem	Israel	CSNTM
ℓ 1296	1556	Apostles^{e}	αω	2	Russian National Library, Gr. 404	Saint Petersburg	Russia	
ℓ 1297	1421	Apostles^{e}	αω	245	Patriarchate of Jerusalem, Saba 222	Jerusalem	Israel	CSNTM
ℓ 1298	11th	Apostles^{esk}	αω	183	Patriarchate of Jerusalem, Saba 266	Jerusalem	Israel	CSNTM
ℓ 1299	15th	Apostles^{e}	αω	389	Patriarchate of Jerusalem, Saba 296	Jerusalem	Israel	CSNTM
ℓ 1300	11th	†Apostles^{esk}	αω	156	Patriarchate of Jerusalem, Stavru 67	Jerusalem	Israel	CSNTM

[top]

=== Lectionaries 1301–1400 ===
#	Date	Contents	Script	Pages	Institution	City, State	Country	Images
ℓ 1301	14th	Apostles^{Lit}	αω	155	Jagiellonian Library, Graec. fol. 48. IV	Kraków	Poland	
ℓ 1302	14th	Apostles^{P}	αω	2	Jagiellonian Library, Graec. qu. 13	Kraków	Poland	
ℓ 1303	14th	Apostles^{Lit}	αω	?	National Library of Greece	Athens	Greece	
ℓ 1304	14th	Apostles^{e}	αω	267	Monastery of Saint John the Theologian, 13	Patmos	Greece	
ℓ 1305	16th	†Apostles^{e}	αω	258	Monastery of Saint John the Theologian, 640	Patmos	Greece	
[ℓ 1306]								
ℓ 1307	15th	Apostles^{esk}	αω	146	National Library of Greece, NLG 116	Athens	Greece	CSNTM
ℓ 1308	15th	Apostles^{esk}	αω	76	National Library of Greece, NLG 144	Athens	Greece	CSNTM
ℓ 1309	15th	†Apostles^{esk}	αω	124	Koutloumousiou Monastery, 372	Mount Athos	Greece	
ℓ 1310	15th	Gospels + Apostles^{Lit}	αω	119	Greek Orthodox Patriarchate, 112	Alexandria	Egypt	INTF
ℓ 1311	12th	Apostles^{P}	αω	3	State Historical Museum, Sinod. gr. 485 (Vlad. 008) fol. 196-198	Moscow	Russia	
ℓ 1312	13th	Apostles^{Lit}	αω	201	National Library, Grec 308	Paris	France	BnF
ℓ 1313	14th	Apostles^{P}	αω	1	National Library, Grec 922, fol. A	Paris	France	BnF
ℓ 1314	15th	Apostles^{P}	αω	2	National Library, Supplement Grec 804, fol. 88-89	Paris	France	INTF
ℓ 1315	12th	Apostles^{P}	αω	4	National Library of Greece, NLG 294	Athens	Greece	CSNTM
ℓ 1316	11th	Apostles^{P}	αω P^{U}	2	Exarchist Monastery of Saint Mary, G. b. 21, fol. 4.5	Grottaferrata	Italy	
ℓ 1317	9th	Gospels^{P}	ΑΩ P^{U}	2	British Library, Add MS 36823, fol. 17. 18	London	United Kingdom	BL
ℓ 1318	13th	Gospels^{P}	αω	2	Congregational Library & Archives, MS Pratt 115	Boston, MA	United States	
ℓ 1319	14th	Gospels^{P}	αω	4	British Library, Add MS 25881 (pages 400-403)	London	United Kingdom	
ℓ 1320	10th	Gospels^{P}	ΑΩ	4	Dionysiou Monastery, 23, fol. 1-2, 220-221	Mount Athos	Greece	
ℓ 1321	14th	Gospels^{P}	αω	1	National Library of Greece	Athens	Greece	
ℓ 1322	13th	Gospels^{P}	αω	1	National and University Library, Ms. 1.901	Strasbourg	France	INTF
ℓ 1323	13th	Gospels^{P}	αω	5	Jagiellonian Library, Graec. fol. 45. VI	Kraków	Poland	
ℓ 1324	12th	Gospels^{P}	αω	2	Zoodochos Pigi Monastery (Hagias), 74 (Einband)	Andros	Greece	
ℓ 1325	1600	Gospels^{Lit-P}	αω	8	Zograf Monastery, 27	Mount Athos	Greece	
ℓ 1326	12th	Gospels^{P}	αω	1	Patriarchate of Jerusalem, Saba 704, 10	Jerusalem	Israel	CSNTM
ℓ 1327	12th	Gospels^{P}	αω	2	Patriarchate of Jerusalem, Saba 704, 11	Jerusalem	Israel	CSNTM
ℓ 1328	10th	Gospels^{P}	ΑΩ	1	Greek Orthodox Patriarchate, 34	Alexandria	Egypt	
ℓ 1329	13th	Gospels^{P}	αω	4	Greek Orthodox Patriarchate, 24 (Einband)	Alexandria	Egypt	
ℓ 1330	1601	Gospels + Apostles^{Lit}	αω	213	Greek Orthodox Patriarchate, 217	Alexandria	Egypt	
ℓ 1331	16th	Gospels + Apostles^{Lit}	αω	177	Greek Orthodox Patriarchate, 46	Alexandria	Egypt	
ℓ 1332	14th	Gospels^{P}	αω	2	Greek Orthodox Patriarchate, 115	Alexandria	Egypt	
ℓ 1333	15th	Apostles^{e}	αω	329	Greek Orthodox Patriarchate, 170	Alexandria	Egypt	
ℓ 1334	13th	†Apostles^{e}	αω	87	Greek Orthodox Patriarchate, 134	Alexandria	Egypt	
ℓ 1335	14th	Gospels^{P}	αω	8	Greek Orthodox Patriarchate	Alexandria	Egypt	
ℓ 1336	15th	Gospels + Apostles^{Lit}	αω	92	Greek Orthodox Patriarchate, 457	Alexandria	Egypt	
ℓ 1337	12th	Gospels^{P}	αω	2	Greek Orthodox Patriarchate, 78	Alexandria	Egypt	
ℓ 1338	16th	Apostles^{P}	αω	1	Greek Orthodox Patriarchate, 218	Alexandria	Egypt	
ℓ 1339	10th	Gospels^{P}	ΑΩ	2	Greek Orthodox Patriarchate, 110	Alexandria	Egypt	
ℓ 1340	12th	Gospels^{P}	αω	2	Greek Orthodox Patriarchate, 42	Alexandria	Egypt	
ℓ 1341	10th	Gospels^{P}	ΑΩ	1	Greek Orthodox Patriarchate, 327	Alexandria	Egypt	
ℓ 1342	12th	Gospels^{P}	αω	4	Greek Orthodox Patriarchate, 380	Alexandria	Egypt	
ℓ 1343	13th	Gospels + Apostles^{Lit}	αω	151	Greek Orthodox Patriarchate, 157	Alexandria	Egypt	
ℓ 1344	14th	Gospels^{Lit}	αω	48	Greek Orthodox Patriarchate, 104	Alexandria	Egypt	
ℓ 1345	9th	Gospels^{PsO}	ΑΩ	3	Herzog August Library, Codd. Weissenburg. 86, fol. 216-218	Wolfenbüttel	Germany	INTF
ℓ 1346	10th	Gospels^{PsO}	ΑΩ	318	Bodleian Library, Auct. D. 4. 1	Oxford	United Kingdom	
ℓ 1347	6th	Gospels^{PsO}	ΑΩ	404	Capitol Library, 1	Verona	Italy	
ℓ 1348	7th	Gospels^{PsO}	ΑΩ	223	Central Library, RP 1	Zurich	Switzerland	
ℓ 1349	9th	Gospels^{PsO}	ΑΩ	171	Abbey library of Saint Gall, Cod. Sang. 17	St. Gallen	Switzerland	e-codices
ℓ 1350	9th	Gospels^{PsO}	ΑΩ	318	Russian State Library, Φ. 201 18B (gr. 3)	Moscow	Russia	
ℓ 1351	9th	Gospels^{PsO}	ΑΩ	66	Library of the Arsenal, 8407	Paris	France	INTF
ℓ 1352	9th	Gospels^{PsO}	ΑΩ	303	Turin National University Library, B.VII.30	Turin	Italy	INTF
[ℓ 1353]=ℓ 962								
ℓ 1354	6th	Gospels^{P}	ΑΩ	1	Cambridge University Library, Add. Mss. 1875	Cambridge	United Kingdom	
ℓ 1355	9th	Gospels^{P}	ΑΩ	1	Bodleian Library, Gr. liturg. c. 1	Oxford	United Kingdom	
ℓ 1356	11th	†Apostles^{esk}	αω	131	Saint Catherine's Monastery, Gr. 284	Sinai	Egypt	CSNTM
ℓ 1357	15th	Apostles^{P}	αω	20	British Library, MS Harley 5731, fol. 183-202	London	United Kingdom	BL
ℓ 1358	9th	Gospels^{P}	ΑΩ	3	National Library, Grec 290, fol. 1-3	Paris	France	INTF
ℓ 1359	14th	Gospels + Apostles^{sel}	αω	(scroll)	Esphigmenou Monastery, 34	Mount Athos	Greece	
[ℓ 1360]	14th	Gospels + Apostles^{Lit-P}	αω	244	Manuscript destroyed			
ℓ 1361	18th	Gospels^{Lit}	αω	?	Esphigmenou Monastery, 237	Mount Athos	Greece	
ℓ 1362	17th	Gospels + Apostles^{Lit}	αω	55	Docheiariou Monastery, 218	Mount Athos	Greece	
ℓ 1363	16th	Gospels + Apostles^{Lit}	αω	69	Docheiariou Monastery, 259	Mount Athos	Greece	
ℓ 1364	12th	†Apostles^{e}	αω	227	Saint Catherine's Monastery, Gr. 285	Sinai	Egypt	CSNTM
ℓ 1365	12th	Apostles^{esk}	αω	276	Saint Catherine's Monastery, Gr. 288	Sinai	Egypt	CSNTM
ℓ 1366	12th	Apostles^{e}	αω	214	Russian State Library, Φ. 173 I 281 (gr. 23)	Moscow	Russia	
ℓ 1367	14th	Apostles^{P}	αω	65	Russian State Library, Φ. 173 I 370 (gr. 177)	Moscow	Russia	
ℓ 1368	11th	†Gospels^{esk}	αω	329	State Historical Museum, Sinod. gr. 470	Moscow	Russia	
ℓ 1369	1371	Gospels^{e}	αω	328	Russian State Library, Φ. 304 III 26	Moscow	Russia	
ℓ 1370	13th	†Gospels^{esk}	αω	147	Russian National Library, Gr. 510	Saint Petersburg	Russia	
ℓ 1371	14th	Gospels + Apostles^{e}	αω	271	Monastery of Saint John the Theologian, 98	Patmos	Greece	
ℓ 1372	14th	Gospels^{P}	αω	2	American Bible Society	Philadelphia, PA	United States	CSNTM
ℓ 1372	14th	Gospels^{P}	αω	15	Trinity College, Watkinson Library Ms. 2	Hartford, CT	United States	CSNTM
ℓ 1373	12th	†Gospels^{e}	αω	219	Trinity College, Watkinson Library Ms. 1	Hartford, CT	United States	
ℓ 1374	12th	Gospels^{esk}	αω	191	National Library of Greece, 72	Athens	Greece	CSNTM
ℓ 1375	10th	Gospels^{P}	ΑΩ	1	Owner Unknown			
ℓ 1376	9th/10th	Gospels^{P}	αω	4	Pechersk Lavra, 2278-2279; KV-1328, KN-1504	Kiev	Ukraine	
ℓ 1377	14th	Gospels + Apostles^{P}	αω P^{O}	2	Vernadsky National Library, F. 301 (KDA), 20 p	Kiev	Ukraine	
ℓ 1378	11th	Gospels^{P}	αω	2	Pechersk Lavra, 2274; KV-1326, KN-1502	Kiev	Ukraine	
ℓ 1379	10th/11th	Gospels^{P}	αω	15	Vernadsky National Library, F. 301 (KDA), 22 l	Kiev	Ukraine	
ℓ 1380	11th	Gospels^{e}	αω	285	Vernadsky National Library, F. 301 (KDA), 23 l	Kiev	Ukraine	
ℓ 1381	10th/11th	†Gospels^{e}	αω	250	Vernadsky National Library, F. 301 (KDA), 21 l	Kiev	Ukraine	
ℓ 1382	13th	Gospels^{esk}	αω	123	Vernadsky National Library, F. 301 (KDA), 24 l	Kiev	Ukraine	
ℓ 1383	11th/12th	†Gospels^{e}	αω	99	Russian State Archives, F. 201, Nr. 191	Moscow	Russia	
ℓ 1384	10th	Gospels^{P}	ΑΩ	2	Russian State Library, Φ. 270 70 (gr. 166.3)	Moscow	Russia	
ℓ 1385	10th	Gospels^{P}	ΑΩ	2	Russian State Library, Φ. 270 70 (gr. 166.4)	Moscow	Russia	
ℓ 1386	10th	Gospels^{P}	ΑΩ	2	State Historical Museum, Sinod. gr. 313 (Vlad. 185) fol. 238.239	Moscow	Russia	
ℓ 1387	16th	Gospels^{Lit}	αω	135	State Historical Museum, Sinod. gr. 486 (Vlad. 271)	Moscow	Russia	
ℓ 1388	14th	Gospels + Apostles^{Lit}	αω	199	State Historical Museum, Sinod. gr. 217 (Vlad. 282)	Moscow	Russia	
ℓ 1389	12th	Gospels^{P}	αω	3	State Historical Museum, Sinod. gr. 191 (Vlad. 341), fol. A 1.133	Moscow	Russia	
ℓ 1390	11th	Gospels^{sel}	αω	114	State Historical Museum, Sinod. gr. 511	Moscow	Russia	
ℓ 1391	1033	Gospels^{e}	αω	398	Russian National Library, Ф. № 573/ Б I 2	Saint Petersburg	Russia	
ℓ 1392	9th	Gospels^{P}	ΑΩ	3	Russian National Library, Ф. № 573/ Б I 5 (fol. 1-303: l 1552)	Saint Petersburg	Russia	
ℓ 1393	12th	†Gospels^{esk}	αω	160	Russian National Library, Ф. № 573/ Б I 7	Saint Petersburg	Russia	
ℓ 1394	11th	†Gospels^{esk}	αω	244	Russian National Library, Ф. № 573/ Б I 6	Saint Petersburg	Russia	
ℓ 1395	9th	John 19:14-20	ΑΩ	1	Russian National Library, Ф. № 906 /Gr. 25	Saint Petersburg	Russia	INTF
[ℓ 1396]	12th	Apostles^{e}	αω	186	Manuscript destroyed			
ℓ 1397	9th	Gospels^{P}	ΑΩ	1	Russian National Library, Gr. 194	Saint Petersburg	Russia	
[ℓ 1398]								
[ℓ 1399]								
[ℓ 1400]								

[top]

=== Lectionaries 1401–1500 ===
#	Date	Contents	Script	Pages	Institution	City, State	Country	Images
ℓ 1401 + [ℓ 857]	1039	Gospels^{esk}	αω	206	Saint Catherine's Monastery, Gr. 223	Sinai	Egypt	CSNTM
ℓ 1401 + [ℓ 857]	1039	Gospels^{esk}	αω	1	Russian National Library, Gr. 289	Saint Petersburg	Russia	
[ℓ 1402]								
ℓ 1403	11th	Gospels^{P}	ΑΩ	1	Russian National Library, Gr. 293	Saint Petersburg	Russia	
ℓ 1404	10th	Gospels^{P}	ΑΩ	2	Russian National Library, Gr. 294	Saint Petersburg	Russia	
ℓ 1405 + [ℓ 868]	1119	Gospels^{esk}	αω	173	Saint Catherine's Monastery, Gr. 234	Sinai	Egypt	CSNTM
ℓ 1405 + [ℓ 868]	1119	Gospels^{esk}	αω	1	Russian National Library, Gr. 297	Saint Petersburg	Russia	
[ℓ 1406]								
[ℓ 1407]								
ℓ 1408 + [ℓ 999]	12th	Gospels^{esk}	αω	180	Patriarchate of Jerusalem, Saba 64	Jerusalem	Israel	CSNTM
[ℓ 1409]								
ℓ 1410 + [ℓ 1005]	1274	Gospels^{esk}	αω	126	Patriarchate of Jerusalem, Saba 153	Jerusalem	Israel	CSNTM
ℓ 1410 + [ℓ 1005]	1274	Gospels^{esk}	αω	2	Russian National Library, Gr. 309	Saint Petersburg	Russia	
[ℓ 1411]								
ℓ 1412 + [ℓ 1018]	13th	†Gospels^{esk}	αω	126	Patriarchate of Jerusalem, Saba 356	Jerusalem	Israel	CSNTM
ℓ 1412 + [ℓ 1018]	13th	†Gospels^{esk}	αω	2	Russian National Library, Gr. 312	Saint Petersburg	Russia	
[ℓ 1413]								
[ℓ 1414]								
[ℓ 1415]								
ℓ 1416	13th	1 Peter 1:1-9, 13-19; 2 Peter 2:11-24	αω	2	Russian National Library, Gr. 325	Saint Petersburg	Russia	INTF
ℓ 1417	10th	Gospels^{P}	αω P^{U}	8	Russian National Library, Gr. 367	Saint Petersburg	Russia	
[ℓ 1418]								
ℓ 1419 + [ℓ 1016]	12th	Gospels^{esk}	αω	94	Patriarchate of Jerusalem, Saba 246	Jerusalem	Israel	CSNTM
ℓ 1419 + [ℓ 1016]	12th	Gospels^{esk}	αω	8	Russian National Library, Gr. 399	Saint Petersburg	Russia	
[ℓ 1420]								
[ℓ 1421]=ℓ 1008								
[ℓ 1422]								
[ℓ 1423]								
ℓ 1424 + [ℓ 1011]	1634	Gospels + Apostles^{sk}	αω	335	Patriarchate of Jerusalem, Saba 203	Jerusalem	Israel	CSNTM
ℓ 1424 + [ℓ 1011]	1634	Gospels + Apostles^{sk}	αω	2	Russian National Library, Gr. 406	Saint Petersburg	Russia	
ℓ 1425	12th	†Gospels^{sk}	αω	113	Russian National Library, Gr. 504	Saint Petersburg	Russia	
ℓ 1426	1180	†Gospels^{esk}	αω	152	Russian National Library, Gr. 512	Saint Petersburg	Russia	
ℓ 1427	14th	†Gospels^{esk}	αω	172	Russian National Library, Gr. 516	Saint Petersburg	Russia	
ℓ 1428	13th	†Apostles^{e}	αω	305	Russian National Library, Gr. 542	Saint Petersburg	Russia	
ℓ 1429	10th	Gospels^{P}	ΑΩ P^{U}	14	Russian National Library, Gr. 645	Saint Petersburg	Russia	
ℓ 1430	11th	Gospels + Apostles^{P}	αω	82	Russian National Library, Gr. 656	Saint Petersburg	Russia	
ℓ 1431	15th	Gospels + Apostles^{Lit}	αω	238	Russian Academy of Sciences Historical Institute, Inostr. Q N° 016	Saint Petersburg	Russia	
ℓ 1432	13th	Gospels^{P}	αω	2	Russian Academy of Sciences Historical Institute, Inostr. F N° 005 (Frg A)	Saint Petersburg	Russia	
ℓ 1433	12th/13th	Gospels	αω	173	National Archives of Albania, Kod. Br. 22	Tirana	Albania	CSNTM
ℓ 1434	14th	Gospels	αω	151	National Archives of Albania, Kod. Br. 9	Tirana	Albania	CSNTM
[ℓ 1435]=0234								
ℓ 1436	15th	Gospels + Apostles^{e}	αω	211	Saint Catherine's Monastery, Gr. 268	Sinai	Egypt	CSNTM
ℓ 1437	14th	Gospels^{k-K}	αω	499	Patriarchate of Jerusalem, Taphu 132	Jerusalem	Israel	CSNTM
ℓ 1438	12th	Gospels^{P}	αω	4	Patriarchate of Jerusalem, Taphu 49	Jerusalem	Israel	CSNTM
ℓ 1439	12th	†Apostles^{esk}	αω	155	Saint Catherine's Monastery, Gr. 289	Sinai	Egypt	CSNTM
ℓ 1440	1251	Apostles^{e}	αω	230	Saint Catherine's Monastery, Gr. 290	Sinai	Egypt	CSNTM
ℓ 1441	13th	Apostles^{e}	αω	213	Saint Catherine's Monastery, Gr. 291	Sinai	Egypt	CSNTM
ℓ 1442	11th	Apostles^{esk}	αω	159	Saint Catherine's Monastery, Gr. 292	Sinai	Egypt	CSNTM
ℓ 1443	11th	Apostles^{esk}	ΑΩ	145	Saint Catherine's Monastery, Gr. 293	Sinai	Egypt	CSNTM
ℓ 1443	11th	Apostles^{esk}	ΑΩ	2	Russian National Library, Gr. 318	Saint Petersburg	Russia	
[ℓ 1444]								
[ℓ 1445]	16th	†Gospels	αω	136	Manuscript destroyed			
[ℓ 1446]	12th	Gospels^{esk}	αω	215	Manuscript destroyed			
ℓ 1447	12th	Gospels^{e}	αω	387	Mega Spileo Monastery, 17	Kalavryta	Greece	
[ℓ 1448]	1269	Gospels^{e}	αω	193	Manuscript destroyed			
[ℓ 1449]	12th	Gospels	αω	205	Manuscript destroyed			
[ℓ 1450]	1172	Gospels^{esk}	αω	177	Manuscript destroyed			
[ℓ 1451]	15th	†Gospels^{e}	αω	270	Manuscript destroyed			
[ℓ 1452]	11th	Gospels^{e}	αω	314	Manuscript destroyed			
[ℓ 1453]	11th	Gospels^{esk}	αω	222	Manuscript destroyed			
[ℓ 1454]	12th	†Gospels^{e}	αω	261	Manuscript destroyed			
[ℓ 1455]	11th	Gospels^{esk}	αω	150	Manuscript destroyed			
[ℓ 1456]	11th	Gospels^{esk}	αω	259	Manuscript destroyed			
[ℓ 1457]	12th	Gospels + Apostles^{Lit}	αω	155	Manuscript destroyed			
[ℓ 1458]	15th	Gospels^{esk}	αω	355	Manuscript destroyed			
[ℓ 1459]	16th	Gospels^{esk}	αω	298	Manuscript destroyed			
[ℓ 1460]	15th	†Gospels^{esk}	αω	314	Manuscript destroyed			
[ℓ 1461]	15th	†Gospels^{e}	αω	195	Manuscript destroyed			
ℓ 1462	1170	†Gospels^{e}	αω	148	Museum of Ecclesiastical Art, 1	Sparta	Greece	
ℓ 1463	1706	Gospels^{e}	αω	337	Museum of Ecclesiastical Art, 3	Sparta	Greece	
ℓ 1464	1652	Gospels^{e}	αω	338	Museum of Ecclesiastical Art, 4	Sparta	Greece	
ℓ 1465	17th	Gospels^{esk}	αω	190	Museum of Ecclesiastical Art, 28	Sparta	Greece	
ℓ 1466	18th	†Gospels^{esk}	αω	159	Museum of Ecclesiastical Art, 47	Sparta	Greece	
ℓ 1467	11th	Gospels + Apostles^{Lit}	αω	217	Patriarchate of Jerusalem, Stavru 15	Jerusalem	Israel	CSNTM
ℓ 1468	13th	Gospels + Apostles^{Lit}	αω	45	Patriarchate of Jerusalem, Saba 143, fol. 80-124	Jerusalem	Israel	CSNTM
ℓ 1469	15th	Gospels + Apostles^{Lit}	αω	137	Patriarchate of Jerusalem, Saba 382	Jerusalem	Israel	
ℓ 1470	14th	Gospels + Apostles^{k}	αω	287	Saint Catherine's Monastery, Gr. 263	Sinai	Egypt	CSNTM
ℓ 1471	15th	Gospels + Apostles^{k}	αω	158	Saint Catherine's Monastery, Gr. 264	Sinai	Egypt	CSNTM
[ℓ 1472]								
ℓ 1473	1582	Gospels + Apostles^{P}	αω	105	Manuscript destroyed			
ℓ 1474	1193	Gospels	αω	276	Manuscript destroyed			
ℓ 1475	16th	Gospels + Apostles^{Lit}	αω	83	Church of Protaton, 61	Mount Athos	Greece	
ℓ 1476	9th	†Gospels^{esk}	ΑΩ	345	St. Panteleimon Monastery	Mount Athos	Greece	
ℓ 1477	1597	Gospels + Apostles^{Lit}	αω	172	St. Panteleimon Monastery, 1212	Mount Athos	Greece	
ℓ 1478	14th	†Gospels^{esk}	αω	92	University Library, Ms. 5512	St. Andrews	United Kingdom	CSNTM
ℓ 1479	11th	Gospels^{P}	αω	2	School, 69	Mileä	Greece	
ℓ 1480	17th	Gospels^{P}	αω	27	Owner Unknown			
ℓ 1481	12th	†Gospels^{e}	αω	296	Russian Academy of Sciences Historical Institute, RAIK 077	Saint Petersburg	Russia	
ℓ 1482	12th	†Gospels^{esk}	αω	?	Owner Unknown			
ℓ 1483	12th	†Gospels^{sk}	αω	123	Russian Academy of Sciences Historical Institute, RAIK 080	Saint Petersburg	Russia	
ℓ 1484	12th	Gospels^{P}	αω	10	Russian Academy of Sciences Historical Institute, RAIK 081	Saint Petersburg	Russia	
ℓ 1485	10th	Gospels^{P}	ΑΩ	2	Russian Academy of Sciences Historical Institute, RAIK 003 + 067	Saint Petersburg	Russia	INTF
ℓ 1486	17th	†Gospels^{e}	αω	207	Russian Academy of Sciences Historical Institute, RAIK 088	Saint Petersburg	Russia	
ℓ 1487	15th	†Apostles^{e}	αω	124	Russian Academy of Sciences Historical Institute, RAIK 091	Saint Petersburg	Russia	
ℓ 1488	12th	Gospels^{esk}	αω	130	Russian Academy of Sciences Historical Institute, RAIK 078	Saint Petersburg	Russia	
[ℓ 1489]								
ℓ 1490	12th	Apostles^{Lit}	αω	192	British Library, Add MS 36600	London	United Kingdom	
ℓ 1491	11th	†Gospels^{esk}	αω	219	British Library, Add MS 36751	London	United Kingdom	BL
ℓ 1492	11th	†Gospels^{esk}	αω	229	British Library, Add MS 37004	London	United Kingdom	BL
ℓ 1493	11th	Gospels^{esk}	αω	147	British Library, Add MS 37005	London	United Kingdom	BL
ℓ 1494	12th	Gospels^{e}	αω	195	British Library, Add MS 37006	London	United Kingdom	BL
ℓ 1495	12th	Gospels^{esk}	αω	318	British Library, Add MS 37007	London	United Kingdom	BL
ℓ 1496	1413	Gospels^{e}	αω	397	British Library, Add MS 37008	London	United Kingdom	BL
ℓ 1497	14th	Gospels^{e}	αω	365	British Library, Egerton MS 2808	London	United Kingdom	INTF
ℓ 1498	1299	Gospels^{esk}	αω	300?	Owner Unknown			
ℓ 1499	11th	†Gospels^{e}	αω	267	John Rylands University Library of Manchester, Gr. Ms. 9	Manchester	United Kingdom	
ℓ 1500	12th/13th	Gospels^{PsO}	αω	284	John Rylands University Library of Manchester, Gr. Ms. 11	Manchester	United Kingdom	

[top]

=== Lectionaries 1501–1600 ===
#	Date	Contents	Script	Pages	Institution	City, State	Country	Images
ℓ 1501	12th	Gospels^{P}	αω	8	Vernadsky National Library, F. V (00ID), Nr. 3621	Kyiv	Ukraine	
[ℓ 1502]								
ℓ 1503	16th	†Gospels^{e}	αω	287	Agion Theodoron Monastery, 3	Kalavryta	Greece	
ℓ 1504	11th	†Apostles^{esk}	αω P^{U}	149	Vatican Library, Barb. gr. 346, fol. 2-47.96-198	Vatican City	Vatican City	
ℓ 1505	11th	Apostles^{e}	αω	123	Vatican Library, Barb. gr. 501	Vatican City	Vatican City	
ℓ 1506	12th	†Apostles^{esk}	αω	107	Lincoln College, Gr. 4	Oxford	United Kingdom	
ℓ 1507	17th	Gospels + Apostles^{Lit}	αω	282	National Library of Greece, NLG 668	Athens	Greece	CSNTM
[ℓ 1508]								
ℓ 1509	17th	Apostles^{Lit}	αω	326	National Library of Greece, NLG 700	Athens	Greece	CSNTM
ℓ 1510	17th	Gospels + Apostles^{Lit}	αω	131	National Library of Greece, NLG 707	Athens	Greece	CSNTM
ℓ 1511	17th	Gospels + Apostles^{Lit}	αω	117	National Library of Greece, NLG 750	Athens	Greece	CSNTM
ℓ 1512	1525	Gospels + Apostles^{Lit}	αω	120	National Library of Greece, NLG 757	Athens	Greece	CSNTM
ℓ 1513	16th	Gospels + Apostles^{Lit}	αω	129	National Library of Greece, NLG 759	Athens	Greece	CSNTM
ℓ 1514	17th	Gospels + Apostles^{Lit}	αω	262	National Library of Greece, NLG 760	Athens	Greece	CSNTM
ℓ 1515	1588	Gospels + Apostles^{Lit}	αω	134	National Library of Greece, NLG 766	Athens	Greece	CSNTM
ℓ 1516	15th	Gospels + Apostles^{Lit}	αω	175	National Library of Greece, NLG 769	Athens	Greece	CSNTM
ℓ 1517	1572	†Gospels + Apostles^{Lit}	αω	36	National Library of Greece, NLG 784	Athens	Greece	CSNTM
ℓ 1518	17th	†Gospels + Apostles^{Lit}	αω	48	National Library of Greece, NLG786	Athens	Greece	CSNTM
ℓ 1519	16th	Gospels + Apostles^{Lit}	αω	495	National Library of Greece, NLG 798	Athens	Greece	CSNTM
[ℓ 1520]								
ℓ 1521	15th	Gospels^{esk}	αω P^{O}	145	National Library of Greece, NLG 78	Athens	Greece	CSNTM
ℓ 1522	12th	†Gospels^{e}	αω	135	National Library of Greece, NLG 97	Athens	Greece	CSNTM
ℓ 1523	1277	Gospels^{esk}	αω	173	National Library of Greece, NLG 104	Athens	Greece	CSNTM
ℓ 1524	1522	†Gospels^{esk}	αω	242	National Library of Greece, NLG 143	Athens	Greece	CSNTM
ℓ 1525	12th	Gospels^{esk}	αω	255	National Library of Greece, NLG 147	Athens	Greece	CSNTM
ℓ 1526	13th	†Gospels^{e}	αω	104	National Library of Greece, NLG 148	Athens	Greece	CSNTM
ℓ 1527	10th	Gospels^{PsO-K}	αω	345	National Library of Greece, NLG 1	Athens	Greece	CSNTM
ℓ 1528	1464	Gospels^{esk}	αω	236	National Library of Greece, NLG 1905	Athens	Greece	CSNTM
ℓ 1529	1288	Gospels^{e}	αω	231	National Library of Greece, NLG 2803	Athens	Greece	CSNTM
ℓ 1530	11th	Gospels^{e}	αω	370	National Library of Greece, NLG 2804	Athens	Greece	CSNTM
ℓ 1531	13th	Gospels + Apostles^{Lit}	αω	277	Monastery of Saint John the Theologian, 104	Patmos	Greece	
ℓ 1532	13th	Gospels + Apostles^{Lit}	αω	130	Monastery of Saint John the Theologian, 105	Patmos	Greece	
ℓ 1533	10th	Gospels^{P}	ΑΩ	87	National Library of Greece, NLG 60	Athens	Greece	CSNTM
ℓ 1534	14th	Gospels^{esk}	αω	208	Clare College, G. 3.9	Cambridge	United Kingdom	CSNTM
ℓ 1535	14th	Gospels^{P}	αω	27	Vatopedi Monastery, 247, fol. 326-352 (fol. 1-325: 1535)	Mount Athos	Greece	
ℓ 1536	13th	†Gospels^{e}	αω	347	Lutheran School of Theology at Chicago, Ms. Gruber 52	Chicago, IL	United States	CSNTM
ℓ 1537	15th	Gospels + Apostles^{Lit}	αω	192	Monastery of Saint John the Theologian, 690	Patmos	Greece	
ℓ 1538	15th	Gospels + Apostles^{Lit}	αω	357	Monastery of Saint John the Theologian, 703	Patmos	Greece	
ℓ 1539	1444	Gospels^{e}	αω	217	Monastery of Saint John the Theologian, 808	Patmos	Greece	
ℓ 1540	1297	Gospels^{e}	αω	232	Monastery of Saint John the Theologian, 790	Patmos	Greece	
ℓ 1541	13th	Gospels^{P}	αω	4	National Library, Supplement Grec 1257, fol. 168-171"	Paris	France	BnF
ℓ 1542	17th	Gospels + Apostles^{Lit}	αω	143	Byzantine and Christian Museum, 35	Athens	Greece	
[ℓ 1543]								
[ℓ 1544]								
[ℓ 1545]								
ℓ 1546	11th	Gospels^{Lit}	αω	?	Owner Unknown			
ℓ 1547	13th	Gospels^{P}	αω	18	Southern Methodist University Bridwell Library, BRMS 12	Dallas, TX	United States	CSNTM
ℓ 1548	13th	Apostles^{P}	αω	10	Konstamonitou Monastery, 106	Mount Athos	Greece	INTF
ℓ 1549	14th	†Gospels^{k-K}	αω	154	National Library of Greece, NLG 1914	Athens	Greece	CSNTM
ℓ 1550	1618	Gospels^{k-KP}	αω	2	Russian National Library, Gr. 408	Saint Petersburg	Russia	
ℓ 1551	11th	Apostles^{P}	αω	101	Saxon State Library, A 104, fol. 1-36.122-186	Dresden	Germany	INTF
ℓ 1552	10th	Gospels^{e}	αω	303	Russian National Library, Ф. № 573/ Б I 5 fol. 1-303	Saint Petersburg	Russia	INTF
ℓ 1553	9th	Gospels^{P}	ΑΩ	2	Docheiariou Monastery, 13, fol. 1 u. 272	Mount Athos	Greece	
ℓ 1554	12th	†Gospels^{esk}	αω	210	Owner Unknown			
ℓ 1555	13th	Apostles^{P}	αω	6	University of Chicago Library, Ms. 50 (Goodspeed)	Chicago, IL	United States	TUOCL
ℓ 1556	12th	Gospels + Apostles^{Lit}	αω	319	Vatopedi Monastery, 625	Mount Athos	Greece	
ℓ 1557	12th	Apostles^{P}	αω	151	Vatopedi Monastery, 1083	Mount Athos	Greece	
ℓ 1558	16th	Apostles^{Lit}	αω	60	Church of Protaton, 70	Mount Athos	Greece	
ℓ 1559	16th	Gospels + Apostles^{Lit}	αω	77	Church of Protaton, 73	Mount Athos	Greece	
ℓ 1560	15th	Gospels + Apostles^{Lit}	αω	125	Patriarchate of Jerusalem, Saba 56	Jerusalem	Israel	
[ℓ 1561]=0250								
ℓ 1562	12th	†Gospels^{esk}	αω	24	Williams College, Chapin Library, De Ricci 2	Williamstown, MA	United States	
ℓ 1562	12th	†Gospels^{esk}	αω	60	Columbia University, Plimpton MS 2	New York, NY	United States	CU
ℓ 1563	13th	†Gospels^{esk}	αω	236	Amherst College, Vault MS .L4	Amherst, MA	United States	AC
ℓ 1564	12th	Gospels^{P}	αω	33	Chicago Theological Seminary Library, 2	Chicago, IL	United States	
[ℓ 1565]								
[ℓ 1566]								
[ℓ 1567]								
ℓ 1568	11th	Gospels^{P}	αω	3	Patriarchate of Jerusalem, Nea Syllogi 59	Jerusalem	Israel	
ℓ 1569	10th	Gospels^{P}	ΑΩ	8	Patriarchate of Jerusalem, Nea Syllogi 67	Jerusalem	Israel	
ℓ 1570	11th	Gospels^{P}	αω	4	Bavarian State Library, Cod. graec. 472, fol. 1-2, 372-373	Munich	Germany	BSB
ℓ 1571	9th	†Gospels^{esk}	ΑΩ	199	Fitzwilliam Museum, McLean Coll. 1	Cambridge	United Kingdom	
ℓ 1572	12th	†Gospels^{sk}	αω	176	Fitzwilliam Museum, McLean Coll. 2	Cambridge	United Kingdom	
ℓ 1573	13th	†Gospels^{e}	αω	165	Fitzwilliam Museum, McLean Coll. 4	Cambridge	United Kingdom	
[ℓ 1574]								
ℓ 1575	9th	1 Pet 2:7-8	ΑΩ	1	British Library, Or. 3579B (59)	London	United Kingdom	
ℓ 1575	9th	Titus 2:15-3:7	ΑΩ	1	Cambridge University Library, Or. 16 1699 Πx	London	United Kingdom	
ℓ 1575	9th	1 Corinthians 1:22-29	ΑΩ	2	National Library, Copt. 129,11, fol. 52-53	Paris	France	
ℓ 1575	9th	Acts 2:1-5	ΑΩ	1	Austrian National Library, Pap. K. 16	Vienna	Austria	CSNTM
ℓ 1575	9th	1 Peter 2:21-25, 5:1-5	ΑΩ	1	Austrian National Library, Pap. K. 17	Vienna	Austria	
[ℓ 1576]=ℓ 1575								
ℓ 1577	13th	Gospels^{P}	αω	2	University of Michigan Library, Ms. 6	Ann Arbor, MI	United States	CSNTM
ℓ 1578	14th	†Gospels^{e}	αω	154	University of Michigan Library, Ms. 9	Ann Arbor, MI	United States	CSNTM
ℓ 1579	14th	†Gospels^{e}	αω	259	University of Michigan Library, Ms. 97	Ann Arbor, MI	United States	CSNTM
ℓ 1580	16th	Gospels^{Lit}	αω	418	University of Michigan Library, Ms. 130	Ann Arbor, MI	United States	CSNTM
ℓ 1581	1520-1570	Gospels + Apostles^{sel}	αω	202	Duke University, Greek MS 104	Durham, NC	United States	DU
ℓ 1582	12th	Matthew 26:27-39; Luke 22:43-45	αω	?	British Library, Add MS 19732	London	United Kingdom	
ℓ 1583	16th	Gospels	αω	199	Owner Unknown			
ℓ 1584	15th	Matthew 26:12-20; John 13:3-15	αω	1	University of Kansas, Kenneth Spencer Research Library, MS 9/2:24	Lawrence, KS	United States	UoCB
ℓ 1585	13th	Luke 18:35-43; 17:3-10	αω	1	Yale University Library, Beinecke MS 521	New Haven, CT	United States	
ℓ 1586	1178	Apostles	αω	200	National Library, Suppl. Gr. 1387	Paris	France	BnF
ℓ 1587	12th/13th	Gospels	αω	241	The New York Public Library, Spencer Collection Greek 2	New York, NY	United States	
ℓ 1588	1550	Gospels	αω	16	Ecclesiastical Museum of Paphos, Metropolis 11	Paphos	Cyprus	
ℓ 1589	11th	John 20:14-18; 21:1-7	αω	1	University of Pennsylvania, Misc Mss Box 14 Folder 8	Philadelphia, PA	United States	UoP
ℓ 1590	13th	Apostles^{e}	αω	241	Saint Catherine's Monastery, Gr. 287	Sinai	Egypt	CSNTM
ℓ 1591	15th	Apostles^{e}	αω	338	Saint Catherine's Monastery, Gr. 294	Sinai	Egypt	CSNTM
ℓ 1592	15th	Apostles^{e}	αω	339	Saint Catherine's Monastery, Gr. 301	Sinai	Egypt	CSNTM
ℓ 1593	14th	Apostles^{e}	αω	291	Saint Catherine's Monastery, Gr. 1589	Sinai	Egypt	CSNTM
ℓ 1594	14th	Apostles^{e}	αω	368	Saint Catherine's Monastery, Gr. 1590	Sinai	Egypt	CSNTM
ℓ 1595	1563	Apostles^{e}	αω	339	Saint Catherine's Monastery, Gr. 1592	Sinai	Egypt	CSNTM
ℓ 1596	10th/11th	Luke 22:1-19	αω	1	National Library, Dept. of Special Collections, 28529	Bucharest	Romania	INTF
[ℓ 1597]								
ℓ 1598	10th	Gospels^{P}	ΑΩ	Frg	University of Chicago Library, Ms. 702 (Goodspeed)	Chicago, IL	United States	TUOCL
ℓ 1599	10th/11th	†Gospels^{esk}	ΑΩ	145	University of Chicago Library, Ms. 128 (Goodspeed)	Chicago, IL	United States	TUOCL
ℓ 1600	15th	Gospels + Apostles^{Lit}	αω	332	University of Chicago Library, Ms. 166 (Goodspeed)	Chicago, IL	United States	TUOCL

[top]

=== Lectionaries 1601–1700 ===
#	Date	Contents	Script	Pages	Institution	City, State	Country	Images
ℓ 1601	5th	Gospels^{P}	ΑΩ P^{U}	2	British Library, Or. 4717 (5)	London	United Kingdom	
ℓ 1602	8th	†Gospels	ΑΩ	82	Morgan Library & Museum, MS M. 615	New York, NY	United States	INTF
ℓ 1602	8th	†Gospels	ΑΩ	1	University of Michigan, Inv. Nr. 4942	Ann Arbor, MI	United States	CSNTM
ℓ 1602	8th	†Gospels	ΑΩ	5	University Library, 615	Freiburg	Germany	INTF
ℓ 1603	12th	Gospels^{P}	ΑΩ	10	British Library, Or. 6801, fol. 22a- 31a	London	United Kingdom	
ℓ 1604	4th	Matthew 7:28; 8:7-9	ΑΩ	1	Bodleian Library, Copt. f. 5 (P)	Oxford	United Kingdom	INTF
ℓ 1605	13th	Gospels^{P}	ΑΩ	1	Bodleian Library, Copt. c. 3, 1 fol.	Oxford	United Kingdom	
ℓ 1605	13th	Gospels^{P}	ΑΩ	1	State and University Library, Lekt. 1	Hamburg	Germany	
ℓ 1605	13th	Gospels^{P}	ΑΩ	1	Austrian National Library, Pap. K 11346	Vienna	Austria	CSNTM
ℓ 1605	13th	Gospels^{P}	ΑΩ	3	British Library, Or. 1242,6	London	United Kingdom	
ℓ 1606	9th	Gospels^{P}	ΑΩ	5	National Library, Copt. 129, 7, fol. 5; 19, fol. 99; 21, fol. 9; 2, fol. 100; 1, fol. 89	Paris	France	
[ℓ 1607]								
ℓ 1608	11th	†Gospels^{esk}	αω	133	Topkapi Palace Museum, 114	Istanbul	Turkey	
ℓ 1609	12th	Gospels + Apostles^{P}	αω	1	University of Chicago Library, Ms. 142 (Goodspeed)	Chicago, IL	United States	TUOCL
ℓ 1610	15th	Gospels^{P}	αω	8	University of Michigan Library, Ms. 7	Ann Arbor, MI	United States	CSNTM
ℓ 1611	14th	Gospels + Apostles^{Lit}	αω P^{O}	221	University of Michigan Library, Ms. 8	Ann Arbor, MI	United States	CSNTM
ℓ 1612	9th	Gospels^{P}	ΑΩ	Frg	University of Michigan Library, Ms. 13	Ann Arbor, MI	United States	
ℓ 1613	15th	†Gospels^{sk}	αω	99	University of Michigan Library, Ms. 76	Ann Arbor, MI	United States	CSNTM
[ℓ 1614]=ℓ 963								
ℓ 1615	13th	Gospels^{esk}	αω	272	University of Michigan Library, Ms. 133	Ann Arbor, MI	United States	CSNTM
ℓ 1616	13th	Gospels^{esk}	αω	182	University of Michigan Library, Ms. 171	Ann Arbor, MI	United States	CSNTM
ℓ 1617	14th	Gospels^{P}	αω	1	University of Michigan Library, Ms. 173d	Ann Arbor, MI	United States	CSNTM
ℓ 1618	14th	Gospels^{P}	αω	52	University of Michigan Library, Ms. 196	Ann Arbor, MI	United States	CSNTM
ℓ 1619	17th	Gospels^{e}	αω	312	Duke University, Greek MS 002	Durham, NC	United States	DU
ℓ 1620	17th	Gospels^{P}	αω	6	Princeton University The Art Museum, y1956-117	Princeton, NJ	United States	
ℓ 1621	13th	†Gospels^{esk}	αω	256	Princeton University Libraries, Garrett MS. 9	Princeton, NJ	United States	INTF
ℓ 1622	13th	†Gospels^{esk}	αω	228	Princeton University Libraries, Garrett MS. 10	Princeton, NJ	United States	
ℓ 1623	13th	†Gospels^{sk}	αω	96	Duke University, Greek MS 082	Durham, NC	United States	DU
ℓ 1624	13th	†Gospels^{sk}	αω	197	Lutheran School of Theology at Chicago, Ms. Gruber 53	Chicago, IL	United States	CSNTM
ℓ 1625	12th	†Gospels^{e}	αω	250	Lutheran School of Theology at Chicago, Ms. Gruber 56	Chicago, IL	United States	CSNTM
ℓ 1626	1186	†Gospels^{esk}	αω	98	Lutheran School of Theology at Chicago, Ms. Gruber 123	Chicago, IL	United States	CSNTM
ℓ 1627	11th	†Gospels^{esk}	αω	168	Lutheran School of Theology at Chicago, Ms. Gruber 124	Chicago, IL	United States	CSNTM
ℓ 1628	13th	Gospels^{P}	αω	8	Lutheran School of Theology at Chicago, Ms. Gruber 125	Chicago, IL	United States	CSNTM
ℓ 1629	10th	†Gospels^{esk}	ΑΩ	179	Walters Art Museum, Ms. W. 520	Baltimore, MD	United States	WAM
ℓ 1629	10th	†Gospels^{esk}	ΑΩ	1	National Library Cyril and Methodius, Gr. 002	Sofia	Bulgaria	
ℓ 1630	1324	Apostles^{P}	αω	35	Great Lavra Monastery, E' 117, fol. 196-230 (fol. 1-195: 1614)	Mount Athos	Greece	CSNTM
ℓ 1631	14th	Apostles^{P}	αω	48	Great Lavra Monastery, E' 179, fol. 192-239 (fol. 1-191: 1620)	Mount Athos	Greece	
ℓ 1632	13th	Gospels^{e}	αω	215	Morgan Library & Museum, MS M.423	New York, NY	United States	
ℓ 1633	14th	Gospels^{P}	αω	44	Great Lavra Monastery, W' 118, fol. 207-250 (fol. 1-206: 1633)	Mount Athos	Greece	
ℓ 1634	11th	Gospels^{esk}	αω	374	Morgan Library & Museum, MS M.647	New York, NY	United States	INTF
ℓ 1635	12th	Gospels^{esk}	αω	293	Morgan Library & Museum, MS M.692	New York, NY	United States	INTF
[ℓ 1636]								
ℓ 1637	9th	Gospels + Apostles^{P}	ΑΩ P^{U}	144	University of Michigan Library, Ms. 37	Ann Arbor, MI	United States	CSNTM
ℓ 1638	16th	Gospels + Apostles^{Lit}	αω	150	University of Michigan Library, Ms. 39	Ann Arbor, MI	United States	CSNTM
ℓ 1639	13th	†Gospels + Apostles^{Lit}	αω	130	University of Michigan Library, Ms. 69	Ann Arbor, MI	United States	CSNTM
ℓ 1640	16th	Gospels + Apostles^{Lit}	αω	177	University of Michigan Library, Ms. 99	Ann Arbor, MI	United States	CSNTM
ℓ 1641	1548	Gospels + Apostles^{Lit}	αω	258	University of Michigan Library, Ms. 100	Ann Arbor, MI	United States	CSNTM
ℓ 1642	13th	†Gospels^{e}	αω	188	University of Chicago Library, Ms. 715 (Goodspeed)	Chicago, IL	United States	TUOCL
ℓ 1643	12th	Gospels^{e}	αω	161	Yale University Library, Beinecke MS 1180	New Haven, CT	United States	YUL
ℓ 1644	12th	Gospels^{e}	αω	331	McGill University	Montreal	Canada	
ℓ 1645	10th	Gospels^{P}	ΑΩ	2	Smithsonian Institution, Freer Gallery of Art, F1909.1683	Washington, DC	United States	FGOA
ℓ 1646	10th	Gospels^{P}	ΑΩ	1	Smithsonian Institution, Freer Gallery of Art, F1909.154	Washington, DC	United States	FGOA
ℓ 1647	13th	Gospels^{P}	αω	1	Smithsonian Institution, Freer Gallery of Art, F1909.1684	Washington, DC	United States	FGOA
ℓ 1648	13th	†Gospels^{sk}	αω	100	Princeton University Libraries, Princeton MS. 5	Princeton, NJ	United States	
ℓ 1649	13th	†Gospels^{esk}	αω	148	National Library of Greece, NLG 2520	Athens	Greece	CSNTM
ℓ 1649	13th	†Gospels^{esk}	αω	148	National Library of Greece, NLG 2520	Athens	Greece	CSNTM
ℓ 1650	12th	†Gospels^{e}	αω	146	National Library of Greece, NLG 2166	Athens	Greece	CSNTM
ℓ 1651	12th	†Gospels^{e}	αω	77	National Library of Greece, NLG 2356	Athens	Greece	CSNTM
ℓ 1652	12th	Gospels^{esk}	αω	166	Byzantine and Christian Museum, 81	Athens	Greece	
ℓ 1653	12th	Gospels^{P}	αω	35	Byzantine and Christian Museum, 82	Athens	Greece	
[ℓ 1654]								
ℓ 1655	1070	Gospels^{e}	αω	245	Byzantine and Christian Museum, 140	Athens	Greece	
ℓ 1656	11th	†Gospels^{esk}	αω	197	Byzantine and Christian Museum, 141	Athens	Greece	
ℓ 1656	11th	†Gospels^{esk}	αω	13	P. Moraux	Berlin	Germany	
ℓ 1657	11th	†Gospels^{esk}	αω	336	Byzantine and Christian Museum, 145	Athens	Greece	
ℓ 1658	12th	†Gospels^{e}	αω	321	Byzantine and Christian Museum, 142	Athens	Greece	
ℓ 1659	12th	Gospels^{e}	αω	261	Byzantine and Christian Museum, 143	Athens	Greece	
ℓ 1660	12th	Gospels^{e}	αω	264	Byzantine and Christian Museum, 146	Athens	Greece	
ℓ 1661	10th	Gospels^{P}	ΑΩ	2	Russian National Library, Gr. 666	Saint Petersburg	Russia	
ℓ 1662	12th	Gospels^{esk}	αω	300	Austrian National Library, Suppl. gr. 128	Vienna	Austria	CSNTM
ℓ 1663	14th	†Gospels^{esk}	αω	110	University of Chicago Library, Ms. 879 (Goodspeed)	Chicago, IL	United States	TUOCL
ℓ 1663	14th	†Gospels^{esk}	αω	1	McGill University	Montreal	Canada	Brice Jones
ℓ 1663	14th	†Gospels^{esk}	αω	1	E. Krentz	St. Louis, MO	United States	CSNTM
ℓ 1664	12th	Apostles^{e}	αω	173	Byzantine and Christian Museum, BXM 131	Athens	Greece	CSNTM
ℓ 1665	9th	Gospels^{P}	ΑΩ	2	Byzantine and Christian Museum, Frg. 1. 2	Athens	Greece	
ℓ 1666	9th	Gospels^{P}	ΑΩ	2	Byzantine and Christian Museum, BXM Frag 3; BXM 19922	Athens	Greece	CSNTM
ℓ 1667	13th	Apostles^{P}	αω	28	Vatopedi Monastery, 978, fol. 1. 2. 215-240 (fol. 3-214: 1605)	Mount Athos	Greece	CSNTM
ℓ 1668	14th	†Gospels^{esk}	αω	234	National Library, Supplement Grec 1331	Paris	France	BnF
ℓ 1669	14th	†Gospels^{esk}	αω	179	National Library, Supplement Grec 1368	Paris	France	BnF
ℓ 1670	15th	Apostles^{P}	αω	9	National Library, Supplement Grec 1370	Paris	France	
ℓ 1671	13th	Gospels + Apostles	αω P^{O}	193	Yale University Library, Beinecke MS 187	New Haven, CT	United States	
ℓ 1672	12th	John 12:36-47	αω	1	Owner Unknown			
ℓ 1673	13th	Gospels^{P}	αω	2	Union Presbyterian Seminary	Richmond, VA	United States	
[ℓ 1674]								
ℓ 1675	13th	Gospels^{P}	αω	1	Bodleian Library, Gr. bib. d. 9	Oxford	United Kingdom	
ℓ 1675	13th	Gospels^{P}	αω	1	H.R. Willoughby, Ms. 3	Chicago, IL	United States	
ℓ 1676	16th	Gospels^{esk}	αω	325	Public Historical Library of Zagora, 4	Zagora	Greece	CSNTM
[ℓ 1677]								
[ℓ 1678]								
[ℓ 1679]								
ℓ 1680	12th	Gospels^{P}	αω	26	State Archives, Ms 168,3	Athens	Greece	
ℓ 1681	15th	Gospels^{esk}	αω	186	Bible Museum, MS 12	Münster	Germany	CSNTM
ℓ 1682	16th	†Gospels^{esk}	αω	131	Bible Museum, MS 14	Münster	Germany	CSNTM
ℓ 1683	13th	†Gospels^{e}	αω	241	Bible Museum, MS 15	Münster	Germany	CSNTM
ℓ 1684	1247	†Gospels^{esk}	αω P^{O}	166	Bible Museum, MS 1	Münster	Germany	CSNTM
ℓ 1685	15th	†Gospels + Apostles^{e}	αω	263	Bible Museum, MS 16	Münster	Germany	CSNTM
ℓ 1686	16th	Gospels + Apostles^{Lit}	αω	184	Bible Museum, MS 13	Münster	Germany	CSNTM
ℓ 1687	8th	Gospels^{P}	ΑΩ P^{U}	3	National Historical Museum, Hist. Eth. Ges. 201	Athens	Greece	CSNTM
ℓ 1688	9th	Gospels^{P}	αω	2	National Historical Museum, 264	Athens	Greece	CSNTM
ℓ 1689	1529	Apostles^{e}	αω	177	Vatopedi Monastery, 868	Mount Athos	Greece	
ℓ 1690	13th	Gospels^{e}	αω	212	Vatopedi Monastery 892	Mount Athos	Greece	
ℓ 1691	17th	Gospels^{e}	αω	218	Vatopedi Monastery, 977	Mount Athos	Greece	
ℓ 1692	11th	†Gospels^{sel}	αω	175	Dionysiou Monastery, 656	Mount Athos	Greece	INTF
ℓ 1693	1201	Gospels^{esk}	αω	205	Dionysiou Monastery, 724	Mount Athos	Greece	
ℓ 1694	12th/13th	†Gospels^{e}	αω	197	Church of the Dormition of the Virgin	Vitsa	Greece	
ℓ 1695	12th	Gospels	αω	295	Owner Unknown			
ℓ 1696	11th	†Gospels	αω	130	Archaeological Museum of Almyros, 1?	Almyros	Greece	
ℓ 1697	12th	†Gospels^{esk}	αω	229	Archimandrius Monastery, 1	Ioannina	Greece	
ℓ 1698	12th	Gospels^{esk}	αω	228	Archimandrius Monastery, 6, 7 & 8	Ioannina	Greece	
[ℓ 1699]								
[ℓ 1700]								

[top]

=== Lectionaries 1701–1800 ===
#	Date	Contents	Script	Pages	Institution	City, State	Country	Images
ℓ 1701	14th	Gospels^{esk}	αω	138	Archimandrius Monastery, 10	Ioannina	Greece	
ℓ 1702	12th	†Gospels^{e}	αω	302	Archimandrius Monastery, 11	Ioannina	Greece	
ℓ 1703	12th	†Gospels^{e}	αω	290	Archimandrius Monastery, 12	Ioannina	Greece	
ℓ 1704	1549	Gospels^{e}	αω	446	Archimandrius Monastery, 13	Ioannina	Greece	INTF
ℓ 1705	1292	Gospels^{esk}	αω	188	Archimandrius Monastery, 14	Ioannina	Greece	
ℓ 1706	15th	Gospels^{esk}	αω	119	Archimandrius Monastery, 15	Ioannina	Greece	
ℓ 1707	1511	†Apostles^{e}	αω	145	Archimandrius Monastery, 17	Ioannina	Greece	
ℓ 1708	13th	†Gospels^{esk}	αω	177	Zosimaia School, 17	Ioannina	Greece	
ℓ 1709	16th	Gospels^{e}	αω	325	Metropolis Library, 1	Ioannina	Greece	
ℓ 1710	16th	†Gospels + Apostles	αω	123	Monastery of Agia Lavra	Kalavryta	Greece	
ℓ 1711	15th	Apostles^{Lit}	αω	524	Owner Unknown			
ℓ 1712	1558	Gospels^{e}	αω	447	Ecclesiastical Historical and Archival Institute of the Patriarchate of Bulgaria, EHAI 575	Sofia	Bulgaria	INTF
ℓ 1713	16th	†Gospels^{e}	αω	296	Ecclesiastical Historical and Archival Institute of the Patriarchate of Bulgaria, EHAI 394	Sofia	Bulgaria	
ℓ 1714	12th	†Gospels^{esk}	αω	61	Ecclesiastical Historical and Archival Institute of the Patriarchate of Bulgaria, EHAI 297	Sofia	Bulgaria	
ℓ 1715	13th	Apostles	αω	276	Owner Unknown			
ℓ 1716	13th/ 14th	†Gospels^{esk}	αω	137	Ecclesiastical Historical and Archival Institute of the Patriarchate of Bulgaria, EHAI 299	Sofia	Bulgaria	
ℓ 1717	14th	Gospels + Apostles^{sk}	αω	204	Ecclesiastical Historical and Archival Institute of the Patriarchate of Bulgaria, EHAI 313	Sofia	Bulgaria	
ℓ 1718	15th	†Apostles^{sk}	αω	165	Ecclesiastical Historical and Archival Institute of the Patriarchate of Bulgaria, EHAI 298	Sofia	Bulgaria	INTF
ℓ 1719	12th	†Gospels^{sk}	αω	95	Monastery of Saint John the Theologian, 769	Patmos	Greece	
ℓ 1720	1699	Gospels^{k}	αω	97	Panachrantos Monastery, 26	Andros	Greece	
ℓ 1721	1688	Gospels^{k}	αω	96	Greek Orthodox Patriarchate, 293	Alexandria	Egypt	
ℓ 1722	13th	†Gospels^{e}	αω	198	Patriarchate of Jerusalem, Stavru 110	Jerusalem	Israel	CSNTM
ℓ 1723	13th	Apostles^{P}	αω	1	Patriarchate of Jerusalem, Nea Syllogi 59	Jerusalem	Israel	
ℓ 1724	15th	†Gospels^{esk}	αω	152	National Library of Greece, Taphu 652	Athens	Greece	
ℓ 1725	16th	Apostles^{sk}	αω	122	National Library of Greece, Taphu 660, fol. 129-250	Athens	Greece	
ℓ 1726	11th	Apostles^{P}	αω	6	National Library of Greece, Taphu 853	Athens	Greece	
ℓ 1727	11th	Apostles^{P}	αω	2	National Library of Greece, Taphu 857,1	Athens	Greece	
ℓ 1728	16th	Gospels	αω	347	Owner Unknown			
ℓ 1729	10th	Gospels^{P}	ΑΩ	2	Russian State Library, Φ. 087 63 (gr. 167.1)	Moscow	Russia	
[ℓ 1730]								
ℓ 1731	9th	Gospels^{P}	ΑΩ	2 Frg	Russian National Library, Ф. № 536/ O 152	Saint Petersburg	Russia	
ℓ 1732	11th	†Gospels^{e}	αω	89	St. Cyril and Methodius National Library, Gr. 4	Sofia	Bulgaria	
ℓ 1733	13th/ 14th	Gospels + Apostles^{esk}	αω	114	St. Cyril and Methodius National Library, Gr. 13	Sofia	Bulgaria	
ℓ 1734	11th	Gospels^{P}	αω	1	St. Cyril and Methodius National Library, Gr. 5	Sofia	Bulgaria	
ℓ 1735	9th/10th	Gospels^{P}	ΑΩ	1	St. Cyril and Methodius National Library, Gr. 1	Sofia	Bulgaria	
[ℓ 1736]								
ℓ 1737	13th	†Gospels^{esk}	αω	227	Romanian Academy, Ms. Gr. 935	Bucharest	Romania	
ℓ 1738	14th	†Gospels^{esk}	αω	86	Romanian Academy, Ms. Gr. 936	Bucharest	Romania	
ℓ 1739	10th	Gospels^{P}	ΑΩ	1	Austrian National Library, Pap. K. 9730	Vienna	Austria	CSNTM
ℓ 1740	16th	Gospels + Apostles^{P}	αω	2	National Library, Ms. II. A. 36	Naples	Italy	
ℓ 1741	9th	Gospels^{P}	ΑΩ	1	British Library, Or. 3579B, fol. 30	London	United Kingdom	
ℓ 1741	9th	Gospels^{P}	ΑΩ	4	National Library, Copt. 129, 21, fol. 11-13; 9, fol. 96	Paris	France	
ℓ 1742	14th	Gospels^{sel}	αω	8	British Library, Add MS 39623	London	United Kingdom	BL
ℓ 1743	1256	Gospels^{esk}	αω	151	British Library, Add MS 40754	London	United Kingdom	BL
ℓ 1744	11th	Gospels^{e}	αω	280	National Library of Scotland, MS. 9000	Edinburgh	United Kingdom	
ℓ 1745	11th/12th	Gospels^{e}	αω	356	John Rylands University Library of Manchester, Gr. Ms. 15	Manchester	United Kingdom	
ℓ 1746	13th	Gospels + Apostles^{P}	ΑΩ	3	Bodleian Library, Gr. bib. e. 1	Oxford	United Kingdom	
ℓ 1747	11th	Gospels^{P}	ΑΩ	2	University Library, Ms. 235 (D Laing III 500)	Edinburgh	United Kingdom	CSNTM
ℓ 1748	11th	Gospels^{e}	αω	244	Royal Danish Library, NKS 2126, 2°	Copenhagen	Denmark	
ℓ 1749	15th	Gospels^{P}	αω	161	Saint Catherine's Monastery, Gr. 109	Sinai	Egypt	CSNTM
ℓ 1750	11th	Gospels^{e}	αω	340	Saint Catherine's Monastery, Gr. 205	Sinai	Egypt	CSNTM
ℓ 1751	1479	Gospels^{P}	αω	5	Great Lavra Monastery, K' 190, fol. 169-173 (fol. 1-168: 1751)	Mount Athos	Greece	CSNTM
ℓ 1752	13th	Gospels^{e}	αω	363	Saint Catherine's Monastery, Gr. 206	Sinai	Egypt	CSNTM
ℓ 1753	12th	Gospels^{e}	αω	339	Saint Catherine's Monastery, Gr. 207	Sinai	Egypt	CSNTM
ℓ 1754	12th	Gospels^{esk}	αω	254	Saint Catherine's Monastery, Gr. 208	Sinai	Egypt	CSNTM
ℓ 1755	12th	Gospels^{e}	αω	348	Saint Catherine's Monastery, Gr. 209	Sinai	Egypt	CSNTM
ℓ 1756	14th	Gospels^{e}	αω	296	Saint Catherine's Monastery, Gr. 238	Sinai	Egypt	CSNTM
ℓ 1757	1373	Gospels^{e}	αω	365	Saint Catherine's Monastery, Gr. 239	Sinai	Egypt	CSNTM
ℓ 1758	16th	Gospels^{e}	αω	449	Saint Catherine's Monastery, Gr. 246	Sinai	Egypt	CSNTM
ℓ 1759	15th	Gospels^{e}	αω	385	Saint Catherine's Monastery, Gr. 247	Sinai	Egypt	CSNTM
ℓ 1760	16th	Gospels^{e}	αω	272	Saint Catherine's Monastery, Gr. 248	Sinai	Egypt	
ℓ 1761	15th	Gospels^{e}	αω	189	Saint Catherine's Monastery, Gr. 249	Sinai	Egypt	CSNTM
ℓ 1762	15th	Gospels^{e}	αω	352	Saint Catherine's Monastery, Gr. 250	Sinai	Egypt	CSNTM
ℓ 1763	14th	Gospels^{e}	αω	337	Saint Catherine's Monastery, Gr. 1343	Sinai	Egypt	CSNTM
ℓ 1764	14th	Gospels + Apostles^{sel}	αω	250	Saint Catherine's Monastery, Gr. 1344	Sinai	Egypt	CSNTM
ℓ 1765	14th	Gospels^{e}	αω	239	Saint Catherine's Monastery, Gr. 1413	Sinai	Egypt	CSNTM
ℓ 1766	16th	Gospels + Apostles^{Lit}	αω	154	Saint Catherine's Monastery, Gr. 2037	Sinai	Egypt	CSNTM
ℓ 1767	1545	Apostles^{e}	αω	198	Saint Catherine's Monastery, Gr. 2049	Sinai	Egypt	CSNTM
ℓ 1768	17th	†Apostles^{e}	αω	361	Saint Catherine's Monastery, Gr. 2050	Sinai	Egypt	CSNTM
ℓ 1769	16th	Apostles^{esk}	αω	181	Saint Catherine's Monastery, Gr. 2052	Sinai	Egypt	CSNTM
ℓ 1770	14th	Gospels + Apostles^{sel}	αω	34	Saint Catherine's Monastery, Gr. 2053	Sinai	Egypt	CSNTM
ℓ 1771	12th	Gospels^{e}	αω	326	Saint Catherine's Monastery, Gr. 2090	Sinai	Egypt	CSNTM
ℓ 1772	15th	Gospels^{e}	αω	365	Saint Catherine's Monastery, Gr. 2254	Sinai	Egypt	CSNTM
ℓ 1773	13th	Gospels^{P}	αω	63	Saint Catherine's Monastery, Arab. 124, N.E. X 125. 424	Sinai	Egypt	CSNTM
ℓ 1774	13th	Apostles^{P}	αω	106	Saint Catherine's Monastery, Arab. 172	Sinai	Egypt	CSNTM
ℓ 1775	17th	Gospels^{e}	αω	285	Patriarchate of Jerusalem, Skevophylakion 2	Jerusalem	Israel	
ℓ 1776	11th	†Gospels	αω	193	Ecumenical Patriarchate, 1	Istanbul	Turkey	
ℓ 1777	12th	†Gospels	αω	120	Ecumenical Patriarchate, 2	Istanbul	Turkey	
ℓ 1778	12th	†Gospels^{esk}	αω	253	Ecumenical Patriarchate, Skevophylakion, 6	Istanbul	Turkey	
ℓ 1779	12th	†Gospels^{esk}	αω	421	Ecumenical Patriarchate, Skevophylakion, 7	Istanbul	Turkey	
ℓ 1780	12th	Gospels^{e}	αω	332	Ecumenical Patriarchate, Skevophylakion, 8	Istanbul	Turkey	INTF
ℓ 1781	12th	†Gospels^{esk}	αω	284	Ecumenical Patriarchate, Skevophylakion, 9	Istanbul	Turkey	
ℓ 1782	13th	Gospels^{e}	αω	235	Ecumenical Patriarchate, Skevophylakion, 10	Istanbul	Turkey	
ℓ 1783	13th	†Gospels^{e}	αω	251	Ecumenical Patriarchate, Chalki, Kamariotissis, 173	Istanbul	Turkey	
ℓ 1784	12th	Gospels^{esk}	αω	167	Ecumenical Patriarchate, Chalki, Kamariotissis, 174	Istanbul	Turkey	
ℓ 1785	13th	Gospels^{e}	αω	298	Ecumenical Patriarchate, Skevophylakion, 13	Istanbul	Turkey	
ℓ 1786	1551	Gospels^{e}	αω	369	Ecumenical Patriarchate, Skevophylakion, 14	Istanbul	Turkey	
ℓ 1787	16th	Gospels	αω	276	Ecumenical Patriarchate, Chalki, Kamariotissis, 168	Istanbul	Turkey	
ℓ 1788	11th	Gospels^{esk}	αω	264	National Library of Greece, Megalê tou Genous Scholê 02	Athens	Greece	INTF
ℓ 1789	1690	Gospels^{k}	αω	106	Great Lavra Monastery, ζ' 65	Mount Athos	Greece	
ℓ 1790	1400	Gospels + Apostles^{Lit}	αω	168	Iviron Monastery, 780	Mount Athos	Greece	
ℓ 1791	16th	Gospels	αω	320	Owner Unknown			
ℓ 1792	13th	Gospels^{esk}	αω	223	Byzantine and Christian Museum, BXM 19513	Athens	Greece	CSNTM
ℓ 1793	17th	†Gospels^{e}	αω	349	Byzantine and Christian Museum, 144	Athens	Greece	
ℓ 1794	14th	†Apostles^{esk}	αω	241	Byzantine and Christian Museum, 148	Athens	Greece	
ℓ 1795	16th	Gospels^{e}	αω	243	Byzantine and Christian Museum, 163	Athens	Greece	
ℓ 1796	1743	Gospels^{e}	αω	218	Byzantine and Christian Museum, 182	Athens	Greece	
ℓ 1797	16th	Gospels^{P}	αω	1	Byzantine and Christian Museum, Frg. 20	Athens	Greece	
ℓ 1798	13th	Gospels^{P}	αω	1	Byzantine and Christian Museum, Frg. 23	Athens	Greece	
ℓ 1799	16th	Gospels^{P}	αω	2	Byzantine and Christian Museum, Frg. 32	Athens	Greece	
ℓ 1800	12th	†Gospels^{e}	αω	265	National Library of Greece, NLG 2168	Athens	Greece	CSNTM

[top]

=== Lectionaries 1801–1900 ===
#	Date	Contents	Script	Pages	Institution	City, State	Country	Images
ℓ 1801	1265	Gospels^{esk}	αω	193	National Library of Greece, NLG 2189	Athens	Greece	CSNTM
ℓ 1802	1602	Gospels^{e}	αω	183	National Library of Greece, NLG 2268	Athens	Greece	CSNTM
ℓ 1803	14th	†Gospels^{e}	αω	236	National Library of Greece, NLG 2269	Athens	Greece	CSNTM
ℓ 1804	1356	†Gospels^{e}	αω	170	National Library of Greece, NLG 2359	Athens	Greece	CSNTM
ℓ 1805	12th	†Gospels^{sk}	αω	297	National Library of Greece, NLG 2363	Athens	Greece	CSNTM
ℓ 1806	1460	Gospels + Apostles^{Lit}	αω	547	National Library of Greece, NLG 2630	Athens	Greece	CSNTM
ℓ 1807	1454	Gospels^{e}	αω	254	National Library of Greece, NLG 2642	Athens	Greece	CSNTM
ℓ 1808	12th	Gospels^{esk}	αω	219	National Library of Greece, NLG 2645	Athens	Greece	CSNTM
ℓ 1809	12th	†Gospels^{esk}	αω	232	National Library of Greece, NLG 2646	Athens	Greece	CSNTM
ℓ 1810	1543	Gospels^{esk}	αω	253	National Library of Greece, NLG 2647	Athens	Greece	CSNTM
ℓ 1811	1491	Gospels + Apostles^{Lit}	αω	144	National Library of Greece, 2658	Athens	Greece	
ℓ 1812	1270	†Gospels^{esk}	αω	137	National Library of Greece, NLG 2672	Athens	Greece	CSNTM
ℓ 1813	12th	†Gospels^{esk}	αω	239	National Library of Greece, NLG 2676	Athens	Greece	CSNTM
ℓ 1813	12th	†Gospels^{esk}	αω	239	National Library of Greece, NLG 2676	Athens	Greece	CSNTM
ℓ 1814	1538	Gospels^{e}	αω	220	National Library of Greece, NLG 2680	Athens	Greece	CSNTM
ℓ 1815	15th	†Apostles^{e}	αω	172	National Library of Greece, NLG 2692	Athens	Greece	CSNTM
ℓ 1816	12th	†Gospels^{esk}	αω	154	National Library of Greece, NLG 2711	Athens	Greece	CSNTM
ℓ 1817	15th	†Gospels^{e}	αω	112	National Library of Greece, NLG 2713	Athens	Greece	CSNTM
ℓ 1818	16th	Apostles^{e}	αω	260	National Library of Greece, NLG 2726	Athens	Greece	CSNTM
ℓ 1819	17th	†Apostles^{esk}	αω	86	National Library of Greece, NLG 2737	Athens	Greece	CSNTM
ℓ 1820	14th	Apostles^{P}	αω	57	National Library of Greece, NLG 2744	Athens	Greece	CSNTM
ℓ 1821	14th	†Gospels^{e}	αω	278	National Library of Greece, NLG 2815	Athens	Greece	CSNTM
ℓ 1822	16th	Gospels^{sk}	αω	175	National Library of Greece, NLG 2864	Athens	Greece	
ℓ 1823	1563	Gospels^{e}	αω	468	National Library of Greece, NLG 2916	Athens	Greece	CSNTM
ℓ 1824	12th	†Gospels^{e}	αω	108	National Library of Greece, NLG 3028	Athens	Greece	CSNTM
ℓ 1825	16th	†Apostles^{e}	αω	117	National Library of Greece, NLG 3041	Athens	Greece	CSNTM
ℓ 1826	11th	†Gospels^{e}	αω	142	National Library of Greece, NLG 3062	Athens	Greece	CSNTM
ℓ 1826	11th	†Gospels^{e}	αω	142	National Library of Greece, NLG 3062	Athens	Greece	CSNTM
ℓ 1827	9th	Gospels^{P}	ΑΩ P^{O}	2	Russian State Library, Φ. 270 72 (gr. 168.1)	Moscow	Russia	
ℓ 1828	12th	Gospels^{P}	αω	5	Russian State Library, Φ. 270 72 (gr. 168.8)	Moscow	Russia	
ℓ 1829	13th	Gospels^{P}	αω	3	Russian State Library, Φ. 270 72 (gr. 168.9)	Moscow	Russia	
ℓ 1830	11th	Gospels^{P}	αω	1	Russian State Library, Φ. 270 71 (gr. 169.1)	Moscow	Russia	
ℓ 1831	11th	Gospels^{P}	αω	2	Russian State Library, Φ. 270 71 (Gr. 169.2)	Moscow	Russia	
ℓ 1832	11th	Gospels^{P}	αω	1	Russian State Library, Φ. 270 71 (gr. 169.3)	Moscow	Russia	
ℓ 1833	11th	Gospels^{P}	αω	2	Russian State Library, Φ. 270 71 (gr. 169.4), Φ. 270 74 (gr. 171.2)	Moscow	Russia	
ℓ 1834	12th	Gospels^{P}	αω	1	Russian State Library, Φ. 270 74 (gr. 171.4)	Moscow	Russia	
ℓ 1835	12th	Gospels^{P}	αω	2	Russian State Library, Φ. 270 75 (gr. 172.5)	Moscow	Russia	
ℓ 1836	9th	Gospels^{P}	ΑΩ P^{U}	3	National Library, Coislin Grec 211, fol. 1, 351-352	Paris	France	
ℓ 1837	8th	Gospels^{P}	ΑΩ P^{U}	2	National Library, Supplement Grec 1232, fol. 1-2	Paris	France	BnF
ℓ 1838	11th	Gospels^{P}	αω	2	Trinity College, B.17.20 (fol. 170r-174r)	Cambridge	United Kingdom	TC
ℓ 1839	11th	Gospels^{e}	αω	267	Duke University, Greek MS 065	Durham, NC	United States	DU
ℓ 1840	15th	Gospels^{esk}	αω	212	Owner Unknown			
ℓ 1841	12th	†Gospels^{e}	αω	269	Russian Academy of Sciences Historical Institute, RAIK 068	Saint Petersburg	Russia	
ℓ 1842	14th	†Gospels^{e}	αω	138	Russian Academy of Sciences Historical Institute, RAIK 071	Saint Petersburg	Russia	
ℓ 1843	11th	†Gospels^{esk}	αω	44	Russian Academy of Sciences Historical Institute, RAIK 075	Saint Petersburg	Russia	
ℓ 1844	14th	Gospels + Apostles^{e}	αω	255	Russian Academy of Sciences Historical Institute, RAIK 087	Saint Petersburg	Russia	
ℓ 1845	11th	Gospels^{P}	αω	1	Russian Academy of Sciences Historical Institute, RAIK 093	Saint Petersburg	Russia	
ℓ 1846	11th/12th	Gospels^{P}	αω	16	Russian Academy of Sciences Historical Institute, RAIK 193	Saint Petersburg	Russia	
ℓ 1847	11th	Gospels^{e}	αω	309	Institute of Oriental Manuscripts, Д 227	Saint Petersburg	Russia	
ℓ 1848	14th	Gospels^{P}	αω	2	Russian National Library, Gr. 534 I	Saint Petersburg	Russia	
ℓ 1849	9th	Gospels^{P}	ΑΩ P^{U}	1	Russian National Library, Gr. 566	Saint Petersburg	Russia	
ℓ 1850	12th	Gospels^{P}	αω	1	Russian National Library, Gr. 637	Saint Petersburg	Russia	
ℓ 1851	12th	Gospels^{P}	αω	1	Russian National Library, Gr. 638	Saint Petersburg	Russia	
ℓ 1852	13th	†Gospels^{sk}	αω	119	Russian National Library, Gr. 669, fol. 66-184	Saint Petersburg	Russia	
ℓ 1853	12th	Gospels^{e}	αω	268	Russian National Library, Gr. 670	Saint Petersburg	Russia	
ℓ 1854	14th	Gospels^{P}	αω P^{O}	4?	Russian National Library, Gr. 679, Gr. 767	Saint Petersburg	Russia	
ℓ 1855	9th	Apostles^{P}	ΑΩ	2	Russian National Library, Gr. 775	Saint Petersburg	Russia	
ℓ 1856	13th	Gospels + Apostles^{P}	αω P^{O}	10	Russian National Library, Gr. 766	Saint Petersburg	Russia	
ℓ 1857	11th	Gospels^{P}	αω	3	Russian National Library, Gr. 800	Saint Petersburg	Russia	
ℓ 1858	12th	†Gospels^{esk}	αω	248	State Historical Museum, Mus. sobr. 3645	Moscow	Russia	
ℓ 1859	12th	Gospels^{esk}	αω	260	State Historical Museum, Mus. sobr. 3647	Moscow	Russia	
ℓ 1860	11th	Gospels^{P}	αω	8	Russian State Library, Φ. 270 74 (gr. 171.1 )	Moscow	Russia	
ℓ 1861	14th	Apostles^{P}	αω	1	Vernadsky National Library, F. 301 (KDA), 24p	Kyiv	Ukraine	
ℓ 1862	11th	Gospels^{e}	αω	246	Vernadsky National Library, F. 301 (KDA), 15p	Kyiv	Ukraine	
ℓ 1863	11th	†Gospels^{e}	αω	329	Vernadsky National Library, F. 310 (Samml. Nejin), 150	Kyiv	Ukraine	
ℓ 1864	12th	Gospels + Apostles^{P}	αω	2	Vernadsky National Library, F. V (OOID), No. 3622	Kyiv	Ukraine	
ℓ 1865	14th	Gospels^{P}	αω	38	Odesa National Scientific Library, 441	Odesa	Ukraine	
ℓ 1866	10th	Gospels^{P}	ΑΩ	13	Odesa National Scientific Library, 552.1	Odesa	Ukraine	
ℓ 1867	10th	Gospels^{P}	ΑΩ	2	Odesa National Scientific Library, 552.2	Odesa	Ukraine	
ℓ 1868	12th	Gospels^{P}	αω	1	Odesa National Scientific Library, 552.3	Odesa	Ukraine	
ℓ 1869	13th	Gospels^{P}	αω	1	Odesa National Scientific Library, 552.4	Odesa	Ukraine	
ℓ 1870	10th	Gospels^{P}	ΑΩ	1	Mesrop Mashtots Institute of Ancient Manuscripts, 612, fol. 1	Yerevan	Armenia	
ℓ 1871	11th	Gospels^{P}	αω	6	Mesrop Mashtots Institute of Ancient Manuscripts, 1049, 1297	Yerevan	Armenia	
ℓ 1872	12th	Gospels^{P}	αω	1	Mesrop Mashtots Institute of Ancient Manuscripts, 1190, fol. 1	Yerevan	Armenia	
ℓ 1873	12th	Gospels^{P}	αω	1	Mesrop Mashtots Institute of Ancient Manuscripts, 1547, fol. 1	Yerevan	Armenia	
ℓ 1874	13th	Gospels^{P}	αω	2	Mesrop Mashtots Institute of Ancient Manuscripts, 1624	Yerevan	Armenia	
ℓ 1875	14th	Gospels^{P}	αω	2	Mesrop Mashtots Institute of Ancient Manuscripts, 2164	Yerevan	Armenia	INTF
ℓ 1876	13th	Gospels^{P}	αω	1	Mesrop Mashtots Institute of Ancient Manuscripts, 2274	Yerevan	Armenia	INTF
ℓ 1877	13th	Gospels^{P}	αω	2	Mesrop Mashtots Institute of Ancient Manuscripts, 3461	Yerevan	Armenia	INTF
ℓ 1878	14th	Gospels^{P}	αω	2	Mesrop Mashtots Institute of Ancient Manuscripts, 6953	Yerevan	Armenia	INTF
ℓ 1879	13th	Gospels^{P}	αω	2	Mesrop Mashtots Institute of Ancient Manuscripts, 8482	Yerevan	Armenia	INTF
ℓ 1880	14th	Gospels^{P}	αω	1	Mesrop Mashtots Institute of Ancient Manuscripts, Frg. 1	Yerevan	Armenia	
ℓ 1881	13th	Gospels^{P}	αω	4	Mesrop Mashtots Institute of Ancient Manuscripts, Frg. 7, 9	Yerevan	Armenia	
[ℓ 1882]								
ℓ 1883	11th/12th	Gospels^{P}	αω	4	St. Cyril and Methodius National Library, Gr. 6	Sofia	Bulgaria	
ℓ 1884	12th	Gospels^{P}	αω	10	St. Cyril and Methodius National Library, Gr. 9	Sofia	Bulgaria	
ℓ 1885	9th	Gospels^{P}	ΑΩ P^{U}	29	National Library of Greece, NLG 2106, fol. 31, 36, 38-47, 54, 185-186, 217, 242-254	Athens	Greece	CSNTM
ℓ 1885	9th	Gospels^{P}	ΑΩ P^{U}	29	National Library of Greece, NLG 2106, fol. 31, 36, 38-47, 54, 185-186, 217, 242-254	Athens	Greece	CSNTM
ℓ 1886	13th/ 14th	Gospels^{esk}	αω	197	Benaki Museum, MS 63/34783	Athens	Greece	CSNTM
ℓ 1887	10th/11th	Gospels^{esk}	αω	171	Benaki Museum, TA 138	Athens	Greece	CSNTM
ℓ 1888	11th/12th	Gospels^{esk}	αω	222	Benaki Museum, TA 140	Athens	Greece	CSNTM
[ℓ 1889]								
ℓ 1890	12th/ 13th	†Gospels^{esk}	αω	162	Benaki Museum, TA 145	Athens	Greece	CSNTM
[ℓ 1891]								
ℓ 1892	11th-13th	Gospels	αω P^{U}	199	Benaki Museum, TA 147	Athens	Greece	CSNTM
[ℓ 1893]								
ℓ 1894	14th	†Apostles^{e}	αω	322	Benaki Museum, TA 271	Athens	Greece	CSNTM
ℓ 1895	13th	Gospels^{P}	αω	61	State Archives, K 47.VI.63	Athens	Greece	
ℓ 1896	13th	Apostles^{P}	αω	4	Vatopedi Monastery, 1219, fol. 15-18	Mount Athos	Greece	CSNTM
ℓ 1897	12th	Gospels^{P}	αω	2	Vatopedi Monastery, 1219, fol. 21.22	Mount Athos	Greece	CSNTM
ℓ 1898	12th	Gospels^{P}	αω	2	Vatopedi Monastery, 1219, fol. 26.27	Mount Athos	Greece	CSNTM
ℓ 1899	13th	Gospels^{P}	αω	2	Vatopedi Monastery, 1219, fol. 28.29	Mount Athos	Greece	CSNTM
ℓ 1900	14th	Gospels + Apostles^{P}	αω	7	Vatopedi Monastery, 1219, fol. 14, 30-33, 38-39	Mount Athos	Greece	CSNTM

[top]

=== Lectionaries 1901–2000 ===
#	Date	Contents	Script	Pages	Institution	City, State	Country	Images
ℓ 1901	12th	Gospels^{P}	αω	6	Vatopedi Monastery, 1219, fol. 19-20, 34-37	Mount Athos	Greece	CSNTM
ℓ 1902	9th	Gospels^{P}	ΑΩ	4	Vatopedi Monastery, 1219, fol. 53-56	Mount Athos	Greece	CSNTM
ℓ 1903	9th	Gospels^{P}	ΑΩ	1	Vatopedi Monastery, 1219, fol. 57	Mount Athos	Greece	CSNTM
[ℓ 1904]=ℓ 358								
ℓ 1905	10th	Gospels^{P}	ΑΩ	1	Vatopedi Monastery, 1219, fol. 61	Mount Athos	Greece	CSNTM
ℓ 1906	10th	Gospels^{P}	ΑΩ	2	Vatopedi Monastery, 1219, fol. 64	Mount Athos	Greece	CSNTM
ℓ 1907	9th	Gospels^{P}	ΑΩ	2	Vatopedi Monastery, 1219, fol. 66-67	Mount Athos	Greece	CSNTM
ℓ 1908	13th	†Gospels^{sk}	αω	181	Kipoureon Monastery	Lixouri, Cephalonia	Greece	
ℓ 1909	16th	Gospels + Apostles	αω	226	Owner Unknown			
ℓ 1910	14th	†Gospels^{esk}	αω	136	Civic Library, 34 B 19	Bassano del Grappa	Italy	
ℓ 1911	12th	Gospels^{sel}	αω	192	Malatestiana Library, Malatestiana D.XXVII.4	Cesena	Italy	BM
ℓ 1912	12th	†Gospels^{esk}	αω	209	Malatestiana Library, Malatestiana D.XXIX.2 (fol. 3-211)	Cesena	Italy	BM
ℓ 1913	14th	Gospels^{P}	αω	2	Malatestiana Library, Malatestiana D.XXIX.2 (fol. 1-2)	Cesena	Italy	BM
ℓ 1914	14th	Gospels^{P}	αω	1	National Library, II. II. 506	Florence	Italy	
ℓ 1915	16th	Gospels + Apostles^{k}	αω	207	Chiesa Madre, 2	Galatone	Italy	
ℓ 1916	11th	Gospels^{P}	αω	2	Ambrosiana Library, B. 60 sup., fol. I. II	Milan	Italy	
ℓ 1917	10th	Gospels^{P}	ΑΩ	Frg	Ambrosiana Library, B. 63 sup., fol. I	Milan	Italy	
ℓ 1918	13th	Apostles^{P}	αω	2	Ambrosiana Library, C. 7 sup	Milan	Italy	
[ℓ 1919]								
ℓ 1920	13th	Gospels^{P}	αω	1	Ambrosiana Library, I. 94 suss., fol. 67	Milan	Italy	INTF
ℓ 1921	17th	Gospels + Apostles^{ek}	αω	141	University of Messina, F. V. 294, fol. 1-75. 111-176	Messina	Italy	
ℓ 1922	12th	Gospels	αω	315	Greek Orthodox Church of Saints Peter and Paul	Naples	Italy	
ℓ 1923	12th	Gospels^{P}	αω	2	Antoniana Library, MM	Padua	Italy	
ℓ 1924	11th	†Gospels^{esk}	αω	212	Central Library, 2Qq F 152	Palermo	Italy	
ℓ 1925	16th	Gospels + Apostles^{k}	αω	221	Central Library, 2Qq C 235, fol. 53-273	Palermo	Italy	
ℓ 1926	11th	Gospels^{P}	ΑΩ	6	State Archive, Raccolta manoscritti 85	Parma	Italy	
ℓ 1927	13th	†Gospels^{e}	αω	256	Seminary Library, 1	Piana degli Albanesi	Italy	
ℓ 1928	13th	†Gospels	αω	204	Seminary Library, 2	Piana degli Albanesi	Italy	
ℓ 1929	13th	Gospels + Apostles^{P}	αω	44	Vatican Library, Vat. gr. 1840, fol. 5-48	Vatican City	Vatican City	
ℓ 1930	12th	Gospels + Apostles^{P}	αω P^{U}	63	Vatican Library, Vat. gr. 1844, fol. 31-87. 118-123	Vatican City	Vatican City	INTF
ℓ 1931	1519	Gospels + Apostles^{sel}	αω	196	Vatican Library, Vat. gr. 2007	Vatican City	Vatican City	INTF
ℓ 1932	16th	Gospels + Apostles^{sel}	αω	207	Vatican Library, Vat. gr. 2032	Vatican City	Vatican City	
ℓ 1933	1552	Gospels^{esk}	αω	178	Vatican Library, Vat. gr. 2311	Vatican City	Vatican City	
ℓ 1934	12th	†Gospels^{e}	αω	197	Vatican Library, Vat. gr. 2320	Vatican City	Vatican City	
ℓ 1935	14th	†Gospels^{esk}	αω P^{O}	139	Vatican Library, Vat. gr. 2502	Vatican City	Vatican City	
ℓ 1936	15th	†Gospels + Apostles^{sk}	αω P^{O}	168	Vatican Library, Vat. gr. 2512	Vatican City	Vatican City	
ℓ 1937	16th	Apostles^{esk}	αω	144	Vatican Library, Vat. gr. 2542	Vatican City	Vatican City	
ℓ 1938	1498	†Gospels^{esk}	αω	165	Vatican Library, Vat. gr. 2560	Vatican City	Vatican City	
ℓ 1939	11th	Gospels^{P}	αω	2	Vatican Library, Vat. gr. 2560	Vatican City	Vatican City	
ℓ 1940	1297	†Gospels^{esk}	αω	200	Vatican Library, Vat. gr. 2563	Vatican City	Vatican City	
ℓ 1941	14th	Gospels^{e}	αω	494	Vatican Library, Vat. gr. 2574, II	Vatican City	Vatican City	
ℓ 1942	11th	†Gospels^{esk}	ΑΩ	257	Turin National University Library, B.II.22	Turin	Italy	INTF
ℓ 1943	13th	Gospels^{P}	αω	2	Marciana National Library, Gr. Z. 27 (341)	Venice	Italy	
ℓ 1944	13th	Gospels^{P}	αω P^{O}	4	Marciana National Library, Gr. I,49 (1213), fol. 251-254	Venice	Italy	
ℓ 1945	9th	Gospels^{P}	ΑΩ	2	Marciana National Library, Gr. I,66 (12057)	Venice	Italy	
ℓ 1946	13th/ 14th	†Gospels^{esk}	αω	90	National and University Library, Ms. 1914	Strasbourg	France	BnF
[ℓ 1947]								
ℓ 1948	11th/12th	†Gospels^{esk}	αω	185	Bavarian State Library, Cod. graec. 609	Munich	Germany	INTF
ℓ 1949	13th	†Gospels + Apostles^{sel}	αω	122	Scheyern Monastery, Ms. 18	Scheyern	Germany	
ℓ 1950	15th	Gospels + Apostles^{P}	αω	36	University Library, Gr. 67, fol. 86-121	Uppsala	Sweden	UU
ℓ 1951	11th	Gospels^{esk}	αω	288	Museum of the Bible, SIG.MS.000848	Washington, DC	United States	
ℓ 1952	9th	Apostles^{P}	ΑΩ P^{U}	1	Bodleian Library, Auct. F. 6. 25*	Oxford	United Kingdom	
ℓ 1953	9th	Gospels	ΑΩ P^{U}	131	Bodleian Library, Barocci 206, fol. 1-131	Oxford	United Kingdom	DB
ℓ 1954	9th	Gospels^{P}	ΑΩ P^{U}	119	Bodleian Library, Selden Supra 2, fol. 2, 7-99, 108-132	Oxford	United Kingdom	
ℓ 1955	9th	Gospels^{P}	ΑΩ P^{U}	76	Bodleian Library, Selden Supra 3	Oxford	United Kingdom	
ℓ 1956	11th	Gospels^{P}	αω	274	Owner Unknown			
ℓ 1957	10th	†Gospels^{esk}	ΑΩ	200	Chester Beatty Library, CBL W 138	Dublin	Ireland	CSNTM
ℓ 1958	11th	†Gospels^{e}	αω	183	Houghton Library, Harvard University, MS Gr 25	Cambridge, MA	United States	
ℓ 1959	13th/ 14th	Gospels^{P}	αω	2	University of Chicago Library, Ms. 939 (Goodspeed)	Chicago, IL	United States	TUOCL
ℓ 1960	13th/ 14th	Gospels^{P}	αω	4	University of Chicago Library, Ms. 1341 (Goodspeed)	Chicago, IL	United States	TUOCL
ℓ 1961	13th/ 14th	Gospels^{P}	αω	4	University of Chicago Library, Ms. 937 (Goodspeed)	Chicago, IL	United States	TUOCL
ℓ 1962	13th/ 14th	Gospels^{P}	αω	1	University of Chicago Library, Ms. 1342 (Goodspeed)	Chicago, IL	United States	TUOCL
ℓ 1963	11th/12th	†Gospels + Apostles^{esk}	αω	207	University of Chicago Library, Ms. 947 (Goodspeed)	Chicago, IL	United States	TUOCL
ℓ 1964	12th	†Gospels^{esk}	αω	106	University of Chicago Library, Ms. 948 (Goodspeed)	Chicago, IL	United States	TUOCL
ℓ 1965	12th	Gospels^{esk}	αω	181	Duke University, Greek MS 010	Durham, NC	United States	DU
ℓ 1966	12th	Gospels^{e}	αω	224	Duke University, Greek MS 012	Durham, NC	United States	DU
ℓ 1967	11th	Gospels^{esk}	αω	241	Duke University, Greek MS 024	Durham, NC	United States	DU
ℓ 1967	11th	Gospels^{esk}	αω	1	Bill Eubanks	Fort Worth, TX	United States	CSNTM
ℓ 1967	11th	Gospels^{esk}	αω	1	David L. Brown	Oak Creek, WI	United States	CSNTM
ℓ 1967	11th	Gospels^{esk}	αω	2	Owner Unknown			CSNTM
ℓ 1968	1544	Gospels + Apostles^{sk}	αω	336	University Library, RB Stewart Ms No. 1	Sydney	Australia	
ℓ 1969	12th	Gospels^{esk}	αω	274	National Museum, Mošin 3	Ochrid	North Macedonia	
ℓ 1970	11th	†Gospels^{e}	αω	286	National Museum, Mošin 4	Ochrid	North Macedonia	
ℓ 1971	12th	Gospels^{esk}	αω	294	National Museum, Mošin 5	Ochrid	North Macedonia	
ℓ 1972	13th	Gospels^{P}	αω	58	National Museum, Mošin 6	Ochrid	North Macedonia	
ℓ 1973	11th	†Gospels^{esk}	αω	215	National Museum, Mošin 7	Ochrid	North Macedonia	
ℓ 1974	13th	†Gospels^{e}	αω	206	National Museum, Mošin 8	Ochrid	North Macedonia	
ℓ 1975	1325	Gospels^{P}	αω	119	National Museum, Mošin 9	Ochrid	North Macedonia	
ℓ 1976	14th	†Gospels^{e}	αω	162	National Museum, Mošin 10	Ochrid	North Macedonia	
ℓ 1977	12th	Gospels + Apostles^{sk}	αω	310	National Museum, Mošin 11	Ochrid	North Macedonia	
ℓ 1978	14th	Gospels + Apostles^{esk}	αω	186	National Museum, Mošin 12	Ochrid	North Macedonia	
ℓ 1979	13th	Apostles^{e}	αω	173	National Museum, Mošin 17	Ochrid	North Macedonia	
ℓ 1980	13th	Gospels^{P}	αω	46	National Center of Manuscripts, Gr. 15	Tbilisi	Georgia	CSNTM
ℓ 1981	12th	Apostles^{P}	αω P^{U}	121	Herzog August Library, Codd. Gud. Gr. 112 (fol. 138/141. 144/149: 2360)	Wolfenbüttel	Germany	
[ℓ 1982]=ℓ 407								
ℓ 1983	14th	Gospels^{esk}	αω	243	University of California, Davis, Shields Library, BS2565 A24 no. 1983	Davis, CA	United States	UC
ℓ 1984	11th	†Gospels^{esk}	αω	203	Christ's College, GG. 2.12 (MS 298)	Cambridge	United Kingdom	CSNTM
ℓ 1985	15th	†Gospels + Apostles^{esk}	αω	246	Christ's College, GG.2.3 (MS 253)	Cambridge	United Kingdom	CSNTM
ℓ 1986	14th	Gospels^{P}	αω	6	Trinity College, O.9.17 (fol. A-D. E-F)	Cambridge	United Kingdom	
ℓ 1987	12th	Gospels^{e}	αω	88	Pembroke College, Ms. 310	Cambridge	United Kingdom	
ℓ 1988	14th	Gospels^{P}	αω P^{O}	32	Cambridge University Library, Add. Mss. 4489	Cambridge	United Kingdom	
ℓ 1989	8th	Gospels^{P}	αω P^{U}	16	Cambridge University Library, Add. Mss. 4489	Cambridge	United Kingdom	
ℓ 1990	9th	Gospels^{P}	ΑΩ	1	Trinity College, MS 2885	Dublin	Ireland	TC
ℓ 1991	11th	Gospels^{P}	αω	1	Trinity College, MS 2886	Dublin	Ireland	TC
ℓ 1992	12th	Gospels^{P}	αω	3	British Library, Add MS 27300, fol. A. B. 235	London	United Kingdom	
[ℓ 1993]								
[ℓ 1994]								
ℓ 1995	1148	Gospels^{e}	αω	175	Museum of the Bible, MOTB.MS.000455	Washington, DC	United States	INTF
ℓ 1996	12th	†Gospels^{esk}	αω	249	Robert McCarthy Collection, BM 2326	London	United Kingdom	INTF
ℓ 1997	14th	Apostles^{esk}	αω	152	John Rylands University Library of Manchester, Gr. Ms. 23	Manchester	United Kingdom	
ℓ 1998	11th	Gospels^{e}	αω	364	Panagia Hozoviotissa Monastery	Amorgos	Greece	
ℓ 1999	11th	†Gospels^{e}	αω	99	Amorgos, Panagia Hozoviotissa Monastery	Amorgos	Greece	
ℓ 2000	12th	Gospels^{e}	αω	342	Panagia Hozoviotissa Monastery	Amorgos	Greece	

[top]

=== Lectionaries 2001–2100 ===
#	Date	Contents	Script	Pages	Institution	City, State	Country	Images
ℓ 2001	12th	Gospels^{P}	αω	17	Panagia Hozoviotissa Monastery	Amorgos	Greece	
ℓ 2002	13th	†Gospels^{e}	αω	145	Panagia Hozoviotissa Monastery	Amorgos	Greece	
ℓ 2003	16th	Gospels^{P}	αω	2	State Archives, Ms 168,4	Athens	Greece	
ℓ 2004	1644	Gospels^{e}	αω	337	Byzantine and Christian Museum, 158	Athens	Greece	
ℓ 2005	10th	Gospels^{P}	ΑΩ	1	Bible Museum, Ms. 20	Münster	Germany	CSNTM
ℓ 2005	10th	Gospels^{P}	ΑΩ	1	Byzantine and Christian Museum, Frg 42	Athens	Greece	
ℓ 2006	14th	Gospels^{P}	αω	4	National Library of Greece, NLG 78	Athens	Greece	CSNTM
ℓ 2007	15th	Gospels^{e}	αω	174	National Library of Greece, NLG 146	Athens	Greece	CSNTM
ℓ 2008	14th	Gospels^{P}	αω P^{O}	2	National Library of Greece, NLG 193, fol. 214-215	Athens	Greece	CSNTM
ℓ 2009	12th	Apostles^{P}	αω	2	National Library of Greece, NLG 1098	Athens	Greece	CSNTM
ℓ 2010	15th	Apostles^{e}	αω	228	National Library of Greece, NLG 2010	Athens	Greece	CSNTM
ℓ 2011	13th	Gospels^{P}	αω	2	National Library of Greece, NLG 2398, fol. 1-2	Athens	Greece	CSNTM
ℓ 2012	11th	Gospels^{P}	ΑΩ	1	National Library of Greece, NLG 2460	Athens	Greece	CSNTM
ℓ 2013	13th	Apostles^{P}	αω	2	National Library of Greece, NLG 2499	Athens	Greece	CSNTM
ℓ 2014	15th	Apostles^{P}	αω	17	National Library of Greece, NLG 2707	Athens	Greece	CSNTM
ℓ 2014	15th	Apostles^{P}	αω	17	National Library of Greece, NLG 2707	Athens	Greece	CSNTM
ℓ 2015	1583	Gospels^{esk}	αω	296	National Library of Greece, NLG 3112	Athens	Greece	CSNTM
ℓ 2016	11th	Gospels^{e-P}	αω	6	Benaki Museum, MS 42	Athens	Greece	CSNTM
ℓ 2017	12th	Gospels^{esk}	αω	201	Benaki Museum, MS 48	Athens	Greece	CSNTM
ℓ 2018	12th	Gospels^{P}	αω	2	Benaki Museum, MS 51	Athens	Greece	CSNTM
ℓ 2019	12th	Gospels^{P}	αω	2	Benaki Museum, MS 52	Athens	Greece	CSNTM
ℓ 2020	13th	Gospels^{esk}	αω P^{O}	127	Benaki Museum, MS 53	Athens	Greece	CSNTM
ℓ 2021	12th	Gospels^{P}	αω	3	Benaki Museum, TA 315 (protheke 30,2)	Athens	Greece	CSNTM
ℓ 2022	11th	Gospels^{e}	αω	216	Benaki Museum, TA 317 (protheke 30,4)	Athens	Greece	CSNTM
ℓ 2023	12th	Gospels^{esk}	αω	338	Benaki Museum, TA 318	Athens	Greece	CSNTM
ℓ 2024	11th	Apostles^{e}	αω	225	Benaki Museum, TA 247	Athens	Greece	CSNTM
ℓ 2025	11th	Gospels^{P}	αω	1	Vatopedi Monastery, 1213, fol. 60	Mount Athos	Greece	
ℓ 2026	10th	Gospels^{P}	ΑΩ	1	Dionysiou Monastery	Mount Athos	Greece	
ℓ 2027	1542	Gospels^{e}	αω	231	Koutloumousiou Monastery, 578	Mount Athos	Greece	INTF
ℓ 2028	13th	Gospels^{P}	αω	2	Koutloumousiou Monastery, 732, fol. 33-34	Mount Athos	Greece	
ℓ 2029	12th	Gospels^{P}	αω	1	Koutloumousiou Monastery, 732, fol. 35	Mount Athos	Greece	
ℓ 2030	10th	Gospels^{P}	ΑΩ	4	Great Lavra Monastery, G' 80	Mount Athos	Greece	INTF
ℓ 2031	12th	Gospels^{e}	αω	313	Great Lavra Monastery, M' 94	Mount Athos	Greece	
ℓ 2032	1543	Gospels^{sk}	αω	142	Great Lavra Monastery, M' 95	Mount Athos	Greece	
ℓ 2033	13th	†Gospels^{e}	αω	236	Great Lavra Monastery, M' 96	Mount Athos	Greece	
ℓ 2034	11th	Gospels^{P}	αω	13	St. Panteleimon Monastery, 96 A' 1	Mount Athos	Greece	
ℓ 2035	15th	Gospels^{P}	αω	6	St. Panteleimon Monastery	Mount Athos	Greece	
ℓ 2036	14th	Gospels^{P}	αω	39	Pantokratoros Monastery, 158, fol. 26-64	Mount Athos	Greece	
ℓ 2037	15th	†Apostles^{e}	αω	175	Panagia Olympiotissa Monastery, 3	Elassona	Greece	
ℓ 2038	12th	Gospels^{P}	αω	1	National Library Cyril and Methodius, Gr. 003	Sofia	Bulgaria	
ℓ 2038	12th	Gospels^{P}	αω	?	Panagia Olympiotissa Monastery, 19, 41, 64, 74, 183	Elassona	Greece	
ℓ 2039	16th	Gospels^{esk}	αω	154	Panagia Olympiotissa Monastery, 62	Elassona	Greece	
ℓ 2040	15th	Gospels^{esk}	αω	206	Panagia Olympiotissa Monastery, 90	Elassona	Greece	
ℓ 2041	15th	Gospels^{esk}	αω	150	Archaeological Museum of Almyros, 1	Almyros	Greece	
ℓ 2042	16th	Gospels^{esk}	αω	190	Seraphim	Helikon	Greece	
ℓ 2043	16th	Gospels^{e}	αω	273	Archaeological Museum of Ioannina, 1	Ioannina	Greece	
ℓ 2044	1451	Gospels^{esk}	αω	112	Zosimaia School, 20	Ioannina	Greece	
ℓ 2045	15th	Gospels^{P}	αω	8	Zosimaia School	Ioannina	Greece	
ℓ 2046	13th	Gospels^{P}	αω	6	Monastery of Agia Lavra, 36	Kalavryta	Greece	
ℓ 2047	12th	Gospels^{P}	αω	1	Monastery of Agia Lavra, 36 b	Kalavryta	Greece	
ℓ 2048	13th	Gospels^{esk}	αω	23	Metropolis Library	Kastoria	Greece	
ℓ 2049	12th	Gospels^{e}	αω	406	Jakovatos	Lixouri, Cephalonia	Greece	
ℓ 2050	12th	Gospels^{esk}	αω	214	State Library, 1	Kozani	Greece	
ℓ 2051	1022	Gospels^{e}	αω	267	State Library, 2	Kozani	Greece	
ℓ 2052	1222	†Gospels^{esk}	αω	174	State Library, 3	Kozani	Greece	
ℓ 2053	10th	Gospels^{P}	ΑΩ	2	Church of Panayia, 11, fol. 1.2 (fol. 3-161: 2679)	Agiasos, Lesbos	Greece	
ℓ 2054	14th	Gospels^{esk}	αω	173	Monastery of St. John the Theologian	Antissa, Lesbos	Greece	
ℓ 2055	15th	†Gospels^{e}	αω	329	Leimonos Monastery, 344	Kalloni, Lesbos	Greece	LM
ℓ 2056	14th	Gospels^{esk}	αω	389	Leimonos Monastery, 368	Kalloni, Lesbos	Greece	LM
ℓ 2057	1537	Gospels^{e}	αω	313	Monastery of Varlaam, 6	Meteora	Greece	INTF
ℓ 2058	1619	Apostles^{e}	αω	255	Monastery of Varlaam, 7	Meteora	Greece	INTF
ℓ 2059	16th	†Gospels + Apostles^{k}	αω	121	Monastery of Varlaam, 98	Meteora	Greece	
ℓ 2060	13th	Gospels^{esk}	αω	155	Great Meteoron Monastery, 8	Meteora	Greece	
ℓ 2061	11th	Gospels^{P}	ΑΩ	2	Great Meteoron Monastery, 8	Meteora	Greece	
ℓ 2062	16th	Gospels^{e}	αω	126	Great Meteoron Monastery, 26	Meteora	Greece	
ℓ 2063	1588	Apostles^{e}	αω	261	Great Meteoron Monastery, 64	Meteora	Greece	
ℓ 2064	1408	Apostles^{esk}	αω	114	Great Meteoron Monastery, 84	Meteora	Greece	
ℓ 2065	1462	Apostles^{e}	αω	139	Great Meteoron Monastery, 147	Meteora	Greece	
ℓ 2066	16th	Gospels^{P}	αω	3	Great Meteoron Monastery, 167	Meteora	Greece	
ℓ 2067	16th	Apostles^{P}	αω	7	Great Meteoron Monastery, 167	Meteora	Greece	
ℓ 2068	12th	Gospels^{e}	αω	249	Great Meteoron Monastery, 301	Meteora	Greece	
ℓ 2069	12th	†Gospels^{esk}	αω	148	Great Meteoron Monastery, 371	Meteora	Greece	
ℓ 2070	1281	Gospels^{esk}	αω	114	Great Meteoron Monastery, 502	Meteora	Greece	
ℓ 2071	12th	Gospels^{e}	αω	281	Great Meteoron Monastery, 546	Meteora	Greece	
ℓ 2072	11th	Gospels^{e}	αω	316	Great Meteoron Monastery, 547	Meteora	Greece	
ℓ 2073	1386	Apostles^{e}	αω	194	Great Meteoron Monastery, 555	Meteora	Greece	
ℓ 2074	13th	Gospels^{e}	αω	317	Great Meteoron Monastery, 556	Meteora	Greece	
ℓ 2075	1402	Gospels^{esk}	αω	246	Great Meteoron Monastery, 581	Meteora	Greece	
ℓ 2076	15th	Gospels^{e}	αω	308	Great Meteoron Monastery, 596	Meteora	Greece	
ℓ 2077	12th	Gospels^{esk}	αω	261	Monastery of St. Stephen, 1	Meteora	Greece	
ℓ 2078	15th	Apostles^{P}	αω	1	Monastery of St. Stephen	Meteora	Greece	
ℓ 2079	10th	Gospels^{e}	ΑΩ	4	Monastery of Saint John the Theologian, 19	Patmos	Greece	
ℓ 2080	9th	Gospels^{P}	ΑΩ	2	Monastery of Saint John the Theologian, 330	Patmos	Greece	
ℓ 2081	16th	Gospels^{e}	αω	461	Kliston	Phyli/Athem	Greece	
ℓ 2082	16th	Apostles^{k}	αω	168	State Library, 10	Piräus	Greece	
ℓ 2083	16th	Gospels^{e}	αω	413	Panagias Monastery, 8	Prussos	Greece	CSNTM
ℓ 2084	12th	Gospels^{e}	αω	324	Rhodos Apollonias	Rhodos	Greece	INTF
ℓ 2085	15th	Gospels^{e}	αω	249	Aristotle University, MS 43	Thessaloniki	Greece	CSNTM
ℓ 2086	14th	†Gospels + Apostles^{esk}	αω	171	Aristotle University, MS 78	Thessaloniki	Greece	CSNTM
ℓ 2087	16th	Gospels + Apostles^{e}	αω	686	Chapel of St. John the Baptist, 4	Skopelos	Greece	
ℓ 2088	1062	Gospels^{esk}	αω	191	Museum of Ecclesiastical Art	Sparta	Greece	
ℓ 2089	12th	Gospels^{esk}	αω	195	Municipal Library, 38	Tyrnavos	Greece	
ℓ 2090	11th	†Gospels^{esk}	αω	195	Phaneromenis Municipal Library	Trikala	Greece	
ℓ 2091	12th	Gospels^{esk}	αω	174	Phaneromenis Municipal Library	Trikala	Greece	
ℓ 2092	14th	Gospels^{e}	αω	233	Saint Vissarionos (Dusan) Monastery, 3	Trikala	Greece	
[ℓ 2093]								
ℓ 2094	10th	†Gospels^{e}	αω P^{O}	320	Zavorda Monastery of St. Nikanor, 2	Grevena	Greece	
ℓ 2095	12th	Gospels^{e}	αω	312	Zavorda Monastery of St. Nikanor, 5	Grevena	Greece	
ℓ 2096	12th	Gospels^{esk}	αω	160	Zavorda Monastery of St. Nikanor, 9	Grevena	Greece	
ℓ 2097	12th	Gospels^{e}	αω	252	Zavorda Monastery of St. Nikanor, 11	Grevena	Greece	
ℓ 2098	12th	Apostles^{e}	αω	253	Zavorda Monastery of St. Nikanor, 13	Grevena	Greece	
ℓ 2099	12th	Gospels^{e}	αω	242	Zavorda Monastery of St. Nikanor, 15	Grevena	Greece	
ℓ 2100	13th	Apostles^{e}	αω	98	Zavorda Monastery of St. Nikanor, 16	Grevena	Greece	

[top]

=== Lectionaries 2101–2200 ===
#	Date	Contents	Script	Pages	Institution	City, State	Country	Images
ℓ 2101	12th	Gospels^{e}	αω	203	Zavorda Monastery of St. Nikanor, 19	Grevena	Greece	
ℓ 2102	14th	Gospels + Apostles^{P}	αω	26	Zavorda Monastery of St. Nikanor, 21	Grevena	Greece	
ℓ 2103	12th	Gospels^{esk}	αω	130	Zavorda Monastery of St. Nikanor, 23	Grevena	Greece	
ℓ 2104	13th	Gospels^{esk}	αω	141	Zavorda Monastery of St. Nikanor, 24	Grevena	Greece	
ℓ 2105	13th	Gospels^{e}	αω	148	Zavorda Monastery of St. Nikanor, 26	Grevena	Greece	
ℓ 2106	11th	Apostles^{e}	αω	222	Zavorda Monastery of St. Nikanor, 41	Grevena	Greece	
ℓ 2107	15th	Gospels^{e}	αω	249	Zavorda Monastery of St. Nikanor, 58	Grevena	Greece	
ℓ 2108	13th	Gospels^{P}	αω	19	Zavorda Monastery of St. Nikanor, 62, fol. 1-19	Grevena	Greece	INTF
ℓ 2109	1453	Gospels^{esk}	αω	293	Zavorda Monastery of St. Nikanor, 103	Grevena	Greece	
ℓ 2110	14th	Gospels^{esk}	αω	329	Zavorda Monastery of St. Nikanor, 114	Grevena	Greece	
ℓ 2111	16th	Apostles^{e}	αω	195	Zavorda Monastery of St. Nikanor, 130	Grevena	Greece	
ℓ 2112	14th	Gospels + Apostles^{P}	αω	2	Vatican Library, Vat. gr. 280, fol. I. II	Vatican City	Vatican City	INTF
ℓ 2113	11th	Gospels^{P}	αω P^{U}	9	Vatican Library, Vat. gr. 469, fol. 1-3. 9-14	Vatican City	Vatican City	INTF
ℓ 2114	10th	Apostles^{P}	αω P^{U}	1	Vatican Library, Vat. gr. 472, fol. 221	Vatican City	Vatican City	INTF
ℓ 2115	15th	Gospels^{P}	αω	9	Vatican Library, Vat. gr. 1516, fol. 275-283	Vatican City	Vatican City	
ℓ 2116	12th	Gospels^{P}	αω	Frg	Vatican Library, Vat. gr. 1896, fol. 266	Vatican City	Vatican City	DVL
ℓ 2117	12th	Apostles^{P}	αω P^{U}	22	Vatican Library, Barb. gr. 297, fol. 16-22, 69, 72, 76-88	Vatican City	Vatican City	
ℓ 2118	12th	Gospels^{P}	αω P^{U}	1	Vatican Library, Barb. gr. 338, fol. 50/53	Vatican City	Vatican City	
ℓ 2119	10th	Apostles^{P}	αω P^{U}	4	Vatican Library, Barb. gr. 338, fol. 64, 71-72, 79	Vatican City	Vatican City	INTF
[ℓ 2120]								
ℓ 2121	10th	Gospels^{P}	ΑΩ P^{U}	13	Vatican Library, Barb. gr. 388, fol. 1-8.15-19	Vatican City	Vatican City	INTF
ℓ 2122	12th	Gospels^{P}	αω P^{U}	58	Vatican Library, Barb. gr. 388, fol. 23-28, 30-32, 35-56, 59-69, 71-73, 75, 78-81, 83, 85-91	Vatican City	Vatican City	
ℓ 2123	9th	Apostles^{P}	ΑΩ P^{U}	2	Vatican Library, Borg. gr. 19, fol. 46. 47	Vatican City	Vatican City	
ℓ 2124	10th	Gospels^{P}	ΑΩ P^{U}	1	Vatican Library, Borg. gr. 19, fol. 69	Vatican City	Vatican City	
ℓ 2125	9th	Gospels + Apostles^{P}	ΑΩ P^{U}	52	Vatican Library, Chis. R IV 11 (gr. 11), fol. 17-42, 46-61, 63, 98-100, 103-104, 107-110	Vatican City	Vatican City	DVL
ℓ 2126	9th	Gospels^{P}	ΑΩ	1	Marciana National Library, Gr. Z. 563 (828), fol. I	Venice	Italy	
ℓ 2127	13th	Apostles^{e}	αω	95	National Library, Mošin 16	Ochrid	Macedonia	
ℓ 2128	14th	Gospels^{P}	αω	26	St. Cyril and Methodius National Library, Gr. 11	Sofia	Bulgaria	
ℓ 2129	13th	Gospels^{P}	αω P^{O}	1	Russian Academy of Sciences Historical Institute, Hist. Inst. 41/669	Saint Petersburg	Russia	
ℓ 2130	14th	†Gospels^{esk}	αω	231	Ecumenical Patriarchate, Chalki, Theol. Schule, 300	Istanbul	Turkey	
ℓ 2131	9th	Luke 17:5-10; 19:1-9	ΑΩ	1	Owner Unknown			INTF
ℓ 2132	9th	Acts 1:1; 18:25-28; 19:1	ΑΩ	1	Owner Unknown			INTF
ℓ 2133	13th	Gospels^{P}	αω	1	Greek Orthodox Patriarchate, 148	Alexandria	Egypt	
ℓ 2134	17th	Gospels^{sel}	αω	49	Greek Orthodox Patriarchate, 328	Alexandria	Egypt	
ℓ 2135	12th	Gospels^{P}	αω	1	University Library	Msida	Malta	
ℓ 2136	13th	Gospels^{P}	αω	2	Armenian Patriarchate, 3144	Jerusalem	Israel	
ℓ 2137	12th	†Gospels^{e}	αω P^{O}	213	Bible Museum, MS 17	Münster	Germany	CSNTM
ℓ 2138	1627	Gospels^{e}	αω	260	Duke University, Greek MS 039	Durham, NC	United States	DU
ℓ 2139	11th/12th	†Gospels^{esk}	αω	149	Dumbarton Oaks, Ms. 1, (Acc. No. BZ.1939.12)	Washington, DC	United States	HU
ℓ 2140	12th	†Gospels^{e}	αω	113	Ecclesiastical Historical and Archival Institute of the Patriarchate of Bulgaria, EHAI 807	Sofia	Bulgaria	
ℓ 2141	10th	Gospels^{P}	ΑΩ	1	Library and Information Centre of the Hungarian Academy of Sciences, K 488 (Moravcsik 01)	Budapest	Hungary	INTF
ℓ 2141	10th	Gospels^{P}	ΑΩ	1	Benaki Museum, Benaki SK 5	Athens	Greece	CSNTM
ℓ 2142	12th	Hebrews 4:13; 5:11-6:7-8; 7:1-6; 18-19	αω	1	Library and Information Centre of the Hungarian Academy of Sciences, K 497 (Moravcsik 10)	Budapest	Hungary	INTF
ℓ 2143	12th	Gospels^{esk}	αω	260	Church of Jesus Christ (British Library, Loan Ms 87)	Kingswood	United Kingdom	
ℓ 2144	13th	Gospels^{P}	αω	5	Duke University, Greek MS 027	Durham, NC	United States	DU
ℓ 2145	13th	Gospels^{P}	αω	1	Duke University, Greek MS 043	Durham, NC	United States	DU
ℓ 2146	17th	Gospels^{k}	αω	323	Museum of Religious Art, 25	Bucharest	Romania	
ℓ 2147	12th	Gospels^{P}	αω	2	Vatican Library, Vat. gr. 1810, fol. 133-134	Vatican City	Vatican City	
ℓ 2148	11th	Apostles^{P}	αω P^{U}	43	Vatican Library, Vat. gr. 1837, fol. 108-150	Vatican City	Vatican City	INTF
ℓ 2149	12th	Gospels^{esk?}	αω P^{U}	159	Vatican Library, Vat. gr. 1839, fol. 1-159	Vatican City	Vatican City	
ℓ 2150	14th	Gospels^{P}	αω	2	Vatican Library, Vat. gr. 1252	Vatican City	Vatican City	INTF
ℓ 2151	15th	†Gospels^{esk}	αω	196	The Van Kampen Foundation, VK 904	(Unknown)	United States	CSNTM
ℓ 2152	16th	†Gospels^{esk}	αω	226	Ecclesiastical Historical and Archival Institute of the Patriarchate of Bulgaria, EHAI 220	Sofia	Bulgaria	
ℓ 2153	1373	Gospels^{esk}	αω	376	Ecclesiastical Historical and Archival Institute of the Patriarchate of Bulgaria, EHAI 296	Sofia	Bulgaria	
ℓ 2154	15th/ 16th	†Apostles^{esk}	αω	152	Ecclesiastical Historical and Archival Institute of the Patriarchate of Bulgaria, EHAI 552	Sofia	Bulgaria	
ℓ 2155	15th/ 16th	†Apostles^{esk}	αω	154	Ecclesiastical Historical and Archival Institute of the Patriarchate of Bulgaria, EHAI 869	Sofia	Bulgaria	
ℓ 2156	10th	Gospels^{P}	ΑΩ	1	Ecclesiastical Historical and Archival Institute of the Patriarchate of Bulgaria, EHAI 947	Sofia	Bulgaria	
ℓ 2157	12th	Gospels^{P}	αω	4	Ecclesiastical Historical and Archival Institute of the Patriarchate of Bulgaria, EHAI 1219	Sofia	Bulgaria	
ℓ 2158	8th/9th	Gospels^{P}	ΑΩ P^{U}	12	State Library, 1, fol. 146-157	Verria	Greece	
ℓ 2159	13th	†Gospels^{esk}	αω	160	State Library, 2 (2301	Verria	Greece	
ℓ 2160	15th	†Gospels^{esk}	αω	90	State Library, 4 (205)	Verria	Greece	
ℓ 2161	12th	Gospels^{P}	αω	3	State Library, 4 (205), Einband	Verria	Greece	
ℓ 2162	1511	Gospels^{e}	αω	207	State Library, 5 (2059)	Verria	Greece	
ℓ 2163	12th	Gospels^{esk}	αω	199	Archaeological Museum, 1, 198 fol., Frg 2, 1 fol.	Verria	Greece	
ℓ 2164	11th	Gospels^{P}	αω	1	Archaeological Museum, Frg 1	Verria	Greece	
ℓ 2165	13th	†Gospels^{esk}	αω	195	Society for Epirotic Studies	Ioannina	Greece	
ℓ 2166	16th	Gospels^{esk}	αω	138	Koronis Monastery, 5	Karditsa	Greece	
ℓ 2167	15th	†Gospels^{esk}	αω	220	Koronis Monastery, 23	Karditsa	Greece	
ℓ 2168	16th	†Gospels^{esk}	αω	215	Koronis Monastery, 25	Karditsa	Greece	
ℓ 2169	16th	†Apostles^{esk}	αω	83	Koronis Monastery, 45	Karditsa	Greece	
ℓ 2170	16th	†Apostles^{esk}	αω	100	Koronis Monastery, 49	Karditsa	Greece	
ℓ 2171	16th	†Apostles^{sk}	αω	70	Koronis Monastery, 54	Karditsa	Greece	
ℓ 2172	1531	†Apostles^{esk}	αω	87	Koronis Monastery	Karditsa	Greece	
ℓ 2173	13th	†Gospels^{e}	αω	179	Metropolis Library, 6	Kastoria	Greece	
ℓ 2174	14th	Gospels^{e}	αω	238	Dionysiu Olympus Monastery	Katerini	Greece	
ℓ 2175	11th	Gospels^{P}	αω	1	Great Meteoron Monastery, 609	Meteora	Greece	
ℓ 2176	16th	†Gospels^{e}	αω	242	Navpaktos, ιβ 27	Tatarnis	Greece	CSNTM
ℓ 2177	1567	Gospels^{esk}	αω	154	Church	Parga	Greece	
ℓ 2178	14th	†Gospels^{e}	αω	107	Church of Panagia, 2	Lindos, Rhodes	Greece	
ℓ 2179	13th	Gospels^{P}	αω	7	Church of Panagia	Lindos, Rhodes	Greece	
ℓ 2180	17th	Gospels^{e}	αω	293	Library of the Metropolis of Samos, 2	Samos	Greece	
ℓ 2181	12th	†Gospels^{esk}	αω	263	Library of the Metropolis of Samos, 3	Samos	Greece	
ℓ 2182	13th	Gospels^{esk}	αω	177	Syllogos Klisurion	Thessaloniki	Greece	
ℓ 2183	12th	Gospels^{e}	αω	375	Owner Unknown			
ℓ 2184	11th	Apostles^{P}	αω	2	Giromeri Monastery	Epirus	Greece	
ℓ 2185	13th	†Gospels^{esk}	αω	93	Church, 2	Chortiatis/Thessaloniki	Greece	
ℓ 2186	13th	Gospels^{P}	αω	1	Church	Chortiatis/Thessaloniki	Greece	
ℓ 2187	12th	Gospels^{e}	αω	196	Museum of the Holy Monastery of Kykkos	Troodos	Cyprus	
ℓ 2188	1531	Gospels^{esk}	αω	ca. 300	St. Mamas Church	Nikosia	Cyprus	
ℓ 2189	1346	Gospels^{e}	αω	372	Church of the Holy Cross, Staurou 1	Lefkara	Cyprus	
ℓ 2190	14th	†Gospels^{esk}	αω	186	Metropolis of Paphos	Paphos	Cyprus	
ℓ 2191	1472	†Gospels^{esk}	αω	131	Metropolis of Paphos, 6	Paphos	Cyprus	
ℓ 2192	16th	Gospels^{P}	αω	14	Metropolis of Paphos,	Paphos	Cyprus	
ℓ 2193	14th	Apostles^{P}	αω	2	Archaeological Museum	Istanbul	Turkey	
ℓ 2194	11th	Gospels^{P}	αω	2	Huis Bergh Castle, Frg 68-69	Heerenberg	Netherlands	
ℓ 2195	11th	Gospels^{P}	αω	1	Bodmer Library, Cod. Bodmer 106	Cologny	Switzerland	e-codices
ℓ 2196	13th	Gospels^{P}	αω	1	Mechitaristenkolleg, Frg. Gr.	Vienna	Austria	
ℓ 2197	1515	†Apostles^{esk}	αω	103	Austrian National Library, Theol. gr. 195	Vienna	Austria	CSNTM
ℓ 2198	12th	Gospels^{P}	ΑΩ	4	Austrian National Library, Suppl. gr. 122	Vienna	Austria	INTF
ℓ 2199	14th	Gospels^{P}	αω	1	Austrian National Library, Suppl. gr. 185	Vienna	Austria	CSNTM
ℓ 2200	9th	Gospels^{P}	ΑΩ	2	Austrian National Library, Suppl. gr. 186, fol. 193	Vienna	Austria	CSNTM

[top]

=== Lectionaries 2201–2300 ===
#	Date	Contents	Script	Pages	Institution	City, State	Country	Images
ℓ 2201	8th/9th	Gospels^{P}	ΑΩ P^{U}	8	Austrian National Library, Jur. gr. 18, fol. 33.35.36.38.49-52	Vienna	Austria	CSNTM
ℓ 2202	9th	Gospels^{P}	ΑΩ	2	Austrian National Library, Phil. gr. 100, fol. III.IV	Vienna	Austria	CSNTM
ℓ 2203	12th	Apostles^{P}	αω	2	Ambrosiana Library, C. 30 inf., fol. 169-170	Milan	Italy	
ℓ 2204	14th	Gospels^{P}	αω	2	Ambrosiana Library, C. 30 inf	Milan	Italy	
ℓ 2205	11th	Gospels^{P}	ΑΩ	1	Ecclesiastical Historical and Archival Institute of the Patriarchate of Bulgaria, EHAI 478	Sofia	Bulgaria	
ℓ 2206	12th	Gospels^{P}	αω	1	Archaeological Museum of Ioannina, 43	Ioannina	Greece	
ℓ 2207	14th	Apostles^{P}	αω	97	Church of Protaton, 84	Mount Athos	Greece	
ℓ 2208	11th/12th	Gospels^{esk}	αω	207	Bible Museum, MS 18	Münster	Germany	CSNTM
ℓ 2209	11th	Gospels^{P}	αω	2	Herzogin Anna Amalia Library, Fol. 511	Weimar	Germany	HAAL
ℓ 2210	6th/7th	Paul^{P}	αω	1	Laurentian Library, PFlor. 550	Florence	Italy	CSNTM
ℓ 2211	996	Gospels^{sel}	ΑΩ	207	Saint Catherine's Monastery, Arab. 116	Sinai	Egypt	CSNTM
ℓ 2212	10th	Gospels + Apostles^{sel}	ΑΩ P^{O}	46	Saint Catherine's Monastery, N. E. MG 8 u. Sp. MG 22	Sinai	Egypt	
ℓ 2213	9th	Gospels^{sel}	ΑΩ	125	Saint Catherine's Monastery, N. E. MG 11	Sinai	Egypt	
ℓ 2214	9th	Apostles^{P}	ΑΩ	1	Saint Catherine's Monastery, N. E. MG 31	Sinai	Egypt	
ℓ 2215	9th	Apostles^{P}	ΑΩ	7	Saint Catherine's Monastery, N. E. MG 36	Sinai	Egypt	
ℓ 2216	9th	Apostles^{P}	ΑΩ	6	Saint Catherine's Monastery, N. E. MG 73	Sinai	Egypt	
ℓ 2217	11th/12th	Gospels + Apostles^{P}	αω	40	Saint Catherine's Monastery, N. E. C 87	Sinai	Egypt	
ℓ 2218	11th/12th	Gospels + Apostles^{sel}	αω	155	Saint Catherine's Monastery, N. E. M 35	Sinai	Egypt	
ℓ 2219	11th/12th	Gospels + Apostles^{sel}	αω	57	Saint Catherine's Monastery, N. E. M 66	Sinai	Egypt	
ℓ 2220	13th	Gospels + Apostles^{P}	αω	18	Saint Catherine's Monastery, N. E. C 73	Sinai	Egypt	
ℓ 2221	14th	Apostles^{P}	αω	89	Saint Catherine's Monastery, N. E. C 159	Sinai	Egypt	
ℓ 2222	11th	Apostles^{P}	ΑΩ	1	Saint Catherine's Monastery, N. E. MG 41	Sinai	Egypt	INTF
ℓ 2223	11th	Gospels^{P}	ΑΩ	1	Saint Catherine's Monastery, N. E. MG 50	Sinai	Egypt	
ℓ 2224	14th	Gospels^{P}	αω	2	Saint Catherine's Monastery, N. E. M 79	Sinai	Egypt	
ℓ 2225	13th	Apostles^{P}	αω	2	Saint Catherine's Monastery, N. E. M 111	Sinai	Egypt	
ℓ 2226	13th	Gospels^{P}	αω	35?	Saint Catherine's Monastery, N. E. X 10	Sinai	Egypt	
ℓ 2227	11th	†Gospels^{esk}	ΑΩ	93	Saint Catherine's Monastery, N. E. MG 23	Sinai	Egypt	
ℓ 2228	9th	†Gospels^{esk}	ΑΩ	51	Saint Catherine's Monastery, N. E. MG 27 u. Sp. MG 5	Sinai	Egypt	
ℓ 2229	11th	Apostles^{sk-P}	ΑΩ	1	Saint Catherine's Monastery, N. E. MG 65	Sinai	Egypt	
ℓ 2230	11th	Apostles^{P}	ΑΩ	4	Saint Catherine's Monastery, N. E. MG 101	Sinai	Egypt	
ℓ 2231	12th	Gospels^{P}	αω P^{O}	12	Saint Catherine's Monastery, N. E. M 11	Sinai	Egypt	
ℓ 2232	13th	Apostles^{P}	αω P^{O}	8	Saint Catherine's Monastery, N. E. M 21	Sinai	Egypt	
ℓ 2233	10th	Apostles^{P}	ΑΩ P^{U}	10	Saint Catherine's Monastery, N. E. M 69	Sinai	Egypt	
ℓ 2234	9th	Apostles^{P}	ΑΩ P^{U}	2	Saint Catherine's Monastery, N. E. M 74	Sinai	Egypt	
ℓ 2235	11th	Apostles^{P}	αω	24?	Saint Catherine's Monastery, N. E. M 149	Sinai	Egypt	
ℓ 2236	11th	Gospels^{P}	αω	19	Saint Catherine's Monastery, N. E. M 152	Sinai	Egypt	
ℓ 2237	12th	Gospels^{P}	αω	36?	Saint Catherine's Monastery, N. E. M 164	Sinai	Egypt	
ℓ 2238	13th	Gospels^{P}	αω	6?	Saint Catherine's Monastery, N. E. M 166	Sinai	Egypt	
ℓ 2239	12th	Gospels^{P}	αω	8	Saint Catherine's Monastery, N. E. M 172	Sinai	Egypt	
ℓ 2240	12th	Gospels^{P}	αω	46	Saint Catherine's Monastery, N. E. M 174	Sinai	Egypt	
ℓ 2241	11th/12th	Gospels^{P}	αω	40	Saint Catherine's Monastery, N. E. C 22	Sinai	Egypt	
ℓ 2242	13th/ 14th	Gospels^{P}	αω	9	Saint Catherine's Monastery, N. E. C 31 u. Sp. C 4	Sinai	Egypt	
ℓ 2243	13th	Gospels + Apostles^{P}	αω	11	Saint Catherine's Monastery, N. E. C 34	Sinai	Egypt	
ℓ 2244	13th/ 14th	Apostles^{e-P}	αω	8	Saint Catherine's Monastery, N. E. C 61	Sinai	Egypt	
ℓ 2245	14th/15th	Gospels + Apostles^{e-P}	αω	10	Saint Catherine's Monastery, N. E. C 104 u. Sp. C 17.18	Sinai	Egypt	
ℓ 2246	12th	Gospels^{P}	αω	6	Saint Catherine's Monastery, N. E. C 105	Sinai	Egypt	
ℓ 2247	13th	Gospels^{P}	αω	16	Saint Catherine's Monastery, Sp. C 7, 14f., 21-26, 39f., 43. 54f.	Sinai	Egypt	
ℓ 2248	14th	Apostles^{esk-P}	αω	44	Saint Catherine's Monastery, N. E. C 130 u. Sp. C 50	Sinai	Egypt	
ℓ 2249	11th/12th	Gospels^{e}	αω	100?	Saint Catherine's Monastery, N. E. C 145	Sinai	Egypt	
ℓ 2250	13th	Gospels^{P}	αω	36	Saint Catherine's Monastery, N. E. C 161, fol. 22-58 u. Sp C 5	Sinai	Egypt	
ℓ 2251	14th/15th	Gospels + Apostles^{P}	αω	53	Saint Catherine's Monastery, N. E. C 176	Sinai	Egypt	
ℓ 2252	12th/ 13th	Gospels^{P}	αω	24	Saint Catherine's Monastery, N. E. C 284 u. Sp. C 27-29, 38, 45, 56	Sinai	Egypt	
ℓ 2253	14th	Gospels + Apostles^{P}	αω	9	Saint Catherine's Monastery, N. E. C 287	Sinai	Egypt	
ℓ 2254	13th/ 14th	Apostles^{P}	αω	6	Saint Catherine's Monastery, N. E. C 288 u. Sp. C 12	Sinai	Egypt	
ℓ 2255	12th/ 13th	Apostles^{P}	αω	6	Saint Catherine's Monastery, N. E. C 289	Sinai	Egypt	
ℓ 2256	12th/ 13th	Gospels + Apostles^{P}	αω	27	Saint Catherine's Monastery, N. E. C 351 u. Sp. C 11. 51	Sinai	Egypt	
ℓ 2257	12th/ 13th	Gospels^{P}	αω	4	Saint Catherine's Monastery, N. E. C 354	Sinai	Egypt	
ℓ 2258	11th	Gospels^{P}	ΑΩ	4	Monastery of St. Stephen, Triados 74, Einband	Meteora	Greece	
ℓ 2259	12th	†Gospels^{esk}	αω	152	Coptic Museum, 2912	Cairo	Egypt	
ℓ 2260	14th	Gospels + Apostles^{P}	αω	49	Osiou Gregoriou Monastery, 158 A, fol. 1-23. 25-50	Mount Athos	Greece	INTF
ℓ 2261	11th	Gospels^{P}	αω	1	Osiou Gregoriou Monastery, 182 A, fol. 1	Mount Athos	Greece	
ℓ 2262	14th	Gospels^{P}	αω	1	Osiou Gregoriou Monastery, 182 B, fol. 9	Mount Athos	Greece	
ℓ 2263	11th	Gospels^{P}	αω	2	Osiou Gregoriou Monastery, 182 C, fol. 11.12	Mount Athos	Greece	
ℓ 2264	14th	Gospels^{P}	αω	1	Osiou Gregoriou Monastery, 182 D, fol. 27	Mount Athos	Greece	
ℓ 2265	12th	†Gospels^{e}	αω	272	Iviron Monastery, 28 (1388)	Mount Athos	Greece	
ℓ 2266	13th	Gospels^{e}	αω	325	Iviron Monastery, 30 (1394)	Mount Athos	Greece	
ℓ 2267	12th	Gospels^{e}	αω	358	Iviron Monastery, 46 (1389)	Mount Athos	Greece	
ℓ 2268	13th	Gospels^{e}	αω	345	Iviron Monastery, 73 (1391)	Mount Athos	Greece	
ℓ 2269	12th	Gospels^{esk}	αω	315	Iviron Monastery, 75 (1390)	Mount Athos	Greece	
ℓ 2270	13th	†Gospels^{e}	αω	280	Iviron Monastery, 111 (1392)	Mount Athos	Greece	
ℓ 2271	15th	Gospels^{e}	αω	338	Iviron Monastery, 193 (1395)	Mount Athos	Greece	
ℓ 2272	1672	Gospels^{e}	αω	274	Taxiarchon, 1	Seriphos	Greece	
ℓ 2273	16th	Gospels + Apostles^{P}	αω	29	Taxiarchon, 21, fol. 1-7. 17-38	Seriphos	Greece	
ℓ 2274	17th	Gospels^{P}	αω	9	Taxiarchon, 21, fol. 8-16	Seriphos	Greece	
ℓ 2275	15th	Gospels + Apostles^{sel}	αω	272	Vlatades Monastery	Thessaloniki	Greece	
ℓ 2276	13th/ 14th	†Gospels^{esk}	αω	55	Bible Museum, Ms. 21	Münster	Germany	CSNTM
ℓ 2277	13th	Gospels^{P}	αω	2	Erzbischof, 6	Athens	Greece	
ℓ 2278	10th	Gospels^{sk-P}	ΑΩ P^{U}	2	Patriarchate of Jerusalem, Stavru 57	Jerusalem	Israel	CSNTM
ℓ 2279	12th	†Gospels^{esk}	αω	291	National Library of South Africa, Bibl., 4 C 1	Cape Town	South Africa	
ℓ 2280	1269	†Gospels^{e}	αω	191	National Library of South Africa, Bibl., 4 C 6	Cape Town	South Africa	
ℓ 2281	12th	Gospels^{P}	αω	2	Woodbrooke College	Birmingham	United Kingdom	
ℓ 2282	16th	Gospels^{P}	αω	1	Southwestern Baptist Theological Seminary, Gr. MS. 1	Fort Worth, TX	United States	CSNTM
ℓ 2283	9th	Gospels^{P}	ΑΩ	3	British Library, Or. MS 7021, fol. 2-4	London	United Kingdom	
ℓ 2284	10th	Gospels^{P}	ΑΩ	1	National Library, Copt. 133, 1, fol. 108d	Paris	France	
ℓ 2285	13th	Gospels^{P}	αω	2	Saint Catherine's Monastery, N. E. Sp. M 1.2	Sinai	Egypt	
ℓ 2286	12th	Gospels^{P}	αω	2	Saint Catherine's Monastery, N. E. Sp. M 3	Sinai	Egypt	
ℓ 2287	14th	Gospels^{P}	αω	2	Saint Catherine's Monastery, N. E. Sp. M 9	Sinai	Egypt	
ℓ 2288	15th	Gospels^{P}	αω	2	Saint Catherine's Monastery, N. E. Sp. M 10	Sinai	Egypt	
ℓ 2289	13th	Gospels^{P}	αω	3	Saint Catherine's Monastery, N. E. Sp. M 11.12	Sinai	Egypt	
ℓ 2290	11th	Gospels^{P}	αω	7	Saint Catherine's Monastery, N. E. Sp. M 13.15	Sinai	Egypt	
ℓ 2291	13th	Gospels^{P}	αω	3	Saint Catherine's Monastery, N. E. Sp. M 16.17	Sinai	Egypt	
ℓ 2292	12th	Gospels^{P}	αω	1	Saint Catherine's Monastery, N. E. Sp. M 19	Sinai	Egypt	
ℓ 2293	13th	Gospels^{P}	αω	1	Saint Catherine's Monastery, N. E. Sp. M 20	Sinai	Egypt	
ℓ 2294	14th	Apostles^{P}	αω	2	Saint Catherine's Monastery, N. E. SP. M 21	Sinai	Egypt	
ℓ 2295	12th	Gospels^{P}	αω	1	Saint Catherine's Monastery, N. E. Sp. M 22	Sinai	Egypt	
ℓ 2296	14th	Gospels^{P}	αω	3	Saint Catherine's Monastery, N. E. Sp. C 1-3	Sinai	Egypt	
ℓ 2297	14th	Gospels^{P}	αω	6	Saint Catherine's Monastery, N. E. Sp. C 8. 31-33. 35-36	Sinai	Egypt	
ℓ 2298	16th	Gospels + Apostles^{P}	αω	1	Saint Catherine's Monastery, N. E. Sp. C 10A	Sinai	Egypt	
ℓ 2299	16th	Apostles^{P}	αω	2	Saint Catherine's Monastery, N. E. Sp. C 10B	Sinai	Egypt	
ℓ 2300	15th	Apostles^{P}	αω	1	Saint Catherine's Monastery, N. E. Sp. C 13	Sinai	Egypt	

[top]

=== Lectionaries 2301–2400 ===
#	Date	Contents	Script	Pages	Institution	City, State	Country	Images
ℓ 2301	16th	Gospels + Apostles^{P}	αω	2	Saint Catherine's Monastery, N. E. Sp. C 16.44	Sinai	Egypt	
ℓ 2302	13th	Gospels^{P}	αω	2	Saint Catherine's Monastery, N. E. Sp. C 41	Sinai	Egypt	
ℓ 2303	14th	Gospels^{P}	αω	1	Saint Catherine's Monastery, N. E. Sp. C 49	Sinai	Egypt	
ℓ 2304	13th	Apostles^{P}	αω	2	Saint Catherine's Monastery, N. E. Sp. M 53	Sinai	Egypt	
ℓ 2305	11th	Gospels^{e}	αω	369	Princeton University Libraries, Scheide M142	Princeton, NJ	United States	
ℓ 2306	11th	Gospels^{P}	αω	8	British Library, Harley MS 5650, fol. 113-120	London	United Kingdom	BL
ℓ 2307	13th	Gospels^{P}	αω	4	Ambrosiana Library, S. 62 sup.	Milan	Italy	
ℓ 2308	9th	Gospels^{P}	ΑΩ	4	Christ Church, Wake 13, fol. I-IV (fol. 1-255: l 206)	Oxford	United Kingdom	INTF
ℓ 2309	10th	Gospels^{esk}	ΑΩ P^{U}	161	University of Michigan Library, Ms. 83	Ann Arbor, MI	United States	CSNTM
ℓ 2310	13th	Gospels^{P}	αω	9	British Library, Add MS 36822, fol. 133-141	London	United Kingdom	BL
ℓ 2311	10th	Gospels^{P}	ΑΩ	2	National Library, Suppl. Gr. 1092, fol. 2.3	Paris	France	
ℓ 2312	13th	Gospels^{P}	αω	2	National Library of Greece, 202, p. 5-8	Athens	Greece	
ℓ 2313	12th	Gospels^{P}	αω	22	National Library of Greece, 202, p. 9-52	Athens	Greece	
ℓ 2314	14th	Gospels^{P}	αω	43	National Library of Greece, 202, p. 53-138	Athens	Greece	
ℓ 2315	12th	Gospels^{P}	αω	2	Exarchist Monastery of Saint Mary, Z. δ. 118, fol. 84.85	Grottaferrata	Italy	
ℓ 2316	13th	Gospels^{P}	αω	4	Exarchist Monastery of Saint Mary, A. δ. 11,6	Grottaferrata	Italy	
ℓ 2317	9th	Gospels^{P}	ΑΩ P^{U}	2	Exarchist Monastery of Saint Mary, B. α. 23 II	Grottaferrata	Italy	
ℓ 2318	11th	Gospels^{P}	αω P^{U}	7	Exarchist Monastery of Saint Mary, Γ. β. 3, fol. 205-211	Grottaferrata	Italy	
ℓ 2319	9th	Gospels^{P}	ΑΩ	1	Angelica Library, 106, fol. 7	Rome	Italy	
ℓ 2320	12th	Gospels^{P}	αω	1	Angelica Library, 106, fol. 8	Rome	Italy	
ℓ 2321	8th	Gospels^{P}	ΑΩ P^{U}	39	Vatican Library, Vat. gr. 2061, fol. 254-292	Vatican City	Vatican City	
ℓ 2322	12th	Gospels^{P}	αω	15	Greek Orthodox Patriarchate, 53, fol. 261-274	Alexandria	Egypt	
ℓ 2323	13th	Gospels^{P}	αω	8	Greek Orthodox Patriarchate, 53, fol. 1-4.275-278	Alexandria	Egypt	
ℓ 2324	13th	Gospels^{P}	αω	4	Patriarchate of Jerusalem, Saba 144	Jerusalem	Israel	CSNTM
ℓ 2325	11th	Gospels^{P}	αω	4	Patriarchate of Jerusalem, Saba 152	Jerusalem	Israel	CSNTM
ℓ 2326	11th	Gospels^{P}	αω	4	Patriarchate of Jerusalem, Stavru 51	Jerusalem	Israel	CSNTM
ℓ 2327	10th	Gospels^{P}	ΑΩ	1	Great Lavra Monastery, B' 74, fol. 288	Mount Athos	Greece	
ℓ 2328	10th	Gospels^{P}	ΑΩ	3	St. Panteleimon Monastery, 96, 2	Mount Athos	Greece	
ℓ 2329	9th	Gospels^{P}	ΑΩ	2	St. Panteleimon Monastery, 96, 3	Mount Athos	Greece	
ℓ 2330	11th	Gospels^{P}	αω	2	St. Panteleimon Monastery, 97, 2	Mount Athos	Greece	
ℓ 2331	12th	Gospels^{P}	αω	1	St. Panteleimon Monastery, 97, 4	Mount Athos	Greece	
ℓ 2332	12th	Gospels^{P}	αω	2	St. Panteleimon Monastery, 97, 6	Mount Athos	Greece	
ℓ 2333	11th	Gospels^{P}	αω	2	St. Panteleimon Monastery, 97, 7	Mount Athos	Greece	
ℓ 2334	12th	Gospels^{P}	αω	2	St. Panteleimon Monastery, 97, 8	Mount Athos	Greece	
ℓ 2335	12th	Gospels^{P}	αω	1	St. Panteleimon Monastery, 97, 9	Mount Athos	Greece	
ℓ 2336	13th	Gospels^{P}	αω	1	St. Panteleimon Monastery, 97, 10	Mount Athos	Greece	
ℓ 2337	12th	Gospels^{P}	αω	2	St. Panteleimon Monastery, 97, 11	Mount Athos	Greece	
ℓ 2338	15th	Gospels^{P}	αω	2	St. Panteleimon Monastery, 97, 12	Mount Athos	Greece	
ℓ 2339	12th	Gospels^{P}	αω	1	St. Panteleimon Monastery, 97, 13	Mount Athos	Greece	
ℓ 2340	12th	Apostles^{P}	αω	1	St. Panteleimon Monastery, 98 A' 2	Mount Athos	Greece	
ℓ 2341	12th	Apostles^{P}	αω	2	St. Panteleimon Monastery, 98 A' 3	Mount Athos	Greece	
ℓ 2342	14th	Apostles^{P}	αω	2	St. Panteleimon Monastery, 98 A' 4	Mount Athos	Greece	
ℓ 2343	1263	Gospels^{P}	αω P^{O}	18	St. Panteleimon Monastery, 100	Mount Athos	Greece	
ℓ 2344	14th	Gospels^{P}	αω	2	Russian Academy of Sciences Historical Institute, Inostr. F N° 005 (Frg B)	Saint Petersburg	Russia	
ℓ 2345	11th	Gospels^{P}	αω	6	Archaeological Museum of Almyros, Nr. 1, fol. 131-136?	Almyros	Greece	
ℓ 2346	12th	Gospels^{P}	αω	2	Archimandrion, Nr. 1	Ioannina	Greece	
ℓ 2347	13th	Gospels^{P}	αω	1	Archimandrion, Nr. 1, fol. 230	Ioannina	Greece	
ℓ 2348	12th	Gospels^{P}	αω	1	Archimandrion, Nr. 6	Ioannina	Greece	
ℓ 2349	14th	Apostles^{P}	αω	1	National Library, Gr. 2661, fol. A	Paris	France	
ℓ 2350	13th	Gospels^{P}	αω P^{O}	65	Russian National Library, Ф. No. 906 / Gr. 669, fol. 1-65	Saint Petersburg	Russia	
ℓ 2351	10th	Gospels^{P}	ΑΩ P^{U}	4	Russian National Library, Ф. No. 906 / Gr. 679, Gr. 767	Saint Petersburg	Russia	
ℓ 2352	13th	Apostles^{P}	αω	3	Ambrosiana Library, D. 108 sup., fol. 1.2.204	Milan	Italy	INTF
ℓ 2353	12th	Gospels^{P}	αω	142	National Archives of Albania, Kod. Br. 19	Tirana	Albania	CSNTM
ℓ 2354	13th	Apostles^{P}	αω	16	Vatican Library, Vat. gr. 774, fol. 1-16	Vatican City	Vatican City	INTF
ℓ 2355	1333	Gospels^{P}	αω	?	Panagia Hozoviotissa Monastery, 91	Amorgos	Greece	
ℓ 2356	15th	Gospels + Apostles^{P}	αω	43	Koutloumousiou Monastery, 483, fol. 164-187 v; 239-257	Mount Athos	Greece	
ℓ 2357	11th/12th	Gospels^{P}	αω	5	Stavronikita Monastery, 6, fol. 449-453	Mount Athos	Greece	
ℓ 2358	13th	Gospels + Apostles^{P}	αω	190	Xeropotamou Monastery, 116	Mount Athos	Greece	
ℓ 2359	16th	Gospels^{Lit-P}	αω	39	Christ's College, MS 252	Cambridge	United Kingdom	CSNTM
ℓ 2360	12th	Gospels^{P}	αω	1	Christ's College, Fragment A	Cambridge	United Kingdom	CSNTM
[ℓ 2361]=ℓ 954								
ℓ 2362	16th	Gospels^{P}	αω	18	Royal Site of San Lorenzo de El Escorial, X.IV.06, fol. 54-71	San Lorenzo de El Escorial	Spain	
ℓ 2363	11th	Apostles^{P}	αω	1	Royal Site of San Lorenzo de El Escorial, X.IV.10, fol. IV	San Lorenzo de El Escorial	Spain	
ℓ 2364	13th	Gospels + Apostles^{P}	αω	224	Ecumenical Patriarchate, Panagias, 66	Istanbul	Turkey	
ℓ 2365	9th/10th	Gospels^{P}	ΑΩ	5	Russian Academy of Sciences Historical Institute, Hist. Inst. 40/669	Saint Petersburg	Russia	
ℓ 2366	13th	Gospels^{P}	αω	15	National Library, Gr. 1152, fol. A-D; 136-146	Paris	France	
ℓ 2367	13th	Apostles	αω	112	Princeton University Libraries, Princeton MS. 95	Princeton, NJ	United States	
ℓ 2368	9th/10th	Apostles^{P}	ΑΩ P^{U}	48	Vatican Library, Arch. Cap. S. Petri, H 45, fol. 1-32, 42-43, 46-47, 50-55, 122-127	Vatican City	Vatican City	DVL
ℓ 2369	12th	Gospels^{P}	αω P^{U}	2	Vatican Library, Arch. Cap. S. Petri, H 45, fol. 265.272	Vatican City	Vatican City	DVL
ℓ 2370	12th	Gospels^{P}	αω	2	Vatican Library, Barb. gr. 475, fol. 195.196	Vatican City	Vatican City	DVL
ℓ 2371	12th	Gospels^{P}	αω	16	Casa del Libro, Ms. 1	San Juan	Puerto Rico	
ℓ 2372	8th/9th	Gospels	ΑΩ	144	National Archives of Albania, Kod. Br. 3	Tirana	Albania	CSNTM
ℓ 2373	13th	Gospels^{esk-P}	αω	1	British Library, Add MS 43790 B (2)	London	United Kingdom	
ℓ 2374	13th	Apostles^{P}	αω	1	British Library, Add MS 43790 B (3)	London	United Kingdom	
ℓ 2375	14th	Gospels^{esk-P}	αω P^{O}	1	British Library, Add MS 43790 B (6)	London	United Kingdom	
ℓ 2376	12th	Gospels^{esk-P}	αω	318	British Library, Add MS 82957	London	United Kingdom	BL
ℓ 2377	9th	Gospels	αω	267	Royal Danish Library, NKS 1792, 2°	Copenhagen	Denmark	
ℓ 2378	11th	Gospels^{esk}	αω	122	University Library, RB Add. Ms No. 40	Sydney	Australia	INTF
ℓ 2379	11th	Gospels^{P}	αω	2	Austrian National Library, Theol. gr. 211, fol. IV. 291	Vienna	Austria	CSNTM
ℓ 2380	10th	Gospels^{P}	αω	3	Austrian National Library, Theol. gr. 268, fol. II. 1. 2	Vienna	Austria	CSNTM
ℓ 2381	18th?	Gospels	αω	?	Byzantine and Christian Museum, 202	Athens	Greece	
ℓ 2382	16th?	Gospels^{P}	αω	393	Byzantine and Christian Museum, 205a	Athens	Greece	
ℓ 2383	15th/ 16th	Gospels^{P}	αω	11	Museum of the Bible, MOTB.MS.000484, fol. 342r-352v	Washington, DC	United States	
ℓ 2384	13th/ 14th	Gospels^{P}	αω	1	The Schøyen Collection, MS 1286	Oslo	Norway	
ℓ 2385	9th/10th	Gospels	αω	2	Ivan Dujcev Center for Slavo-Byzantine Studies, 06 (Kosinitza 74)	Sofia	Bulgaria	
ℓ 2386	14th	Gospels^{P}	αω	2	Ivan Dujcev Center for Slavo-Byzantine Studies, 25	Sofia	Bulgaria	
ℓ 2387	13th/ 14th	Gospels^{P}	αω	1	Ivan Dujcev Center for Slavo-Byzantine Studies, 26	Sofia	Bulgaria	
ℓ 2388	1378	Gospels	αω	424	Ivan Dujcev Center for Slavo-Byzantine Studies, 12	Sofia	Bulgaria	INTF
ℓ 2389	9th/10th	Matthew 21:35-36; 25:31-37; Luke 15:15-23	αω	2	Ivan Dujcev Center for Slavo-Byzantine Studies, 89	Sofia	Bulgaria	
ℓ 2390	11th/12th	Gospels^{e}	αω P^{O}	208	Austrian National Library, Suppl. gr. 200	Vienna	Austria	
ℓ 2391	11th	Gospels	αω	154	Ivan Vazov National Library, Ρ 099	Plovdiv	Bulgaria	
ℓ 2392	13th/ 14th	Gospels^{sk}	αω	118	Ivan Vazov National Library, Ρ 120	Plovdiv	Bulgaria	
ℓ 2393	12th	Gospels + Apostles^{P}	αω P^{U}	8	Exarchist Monastery of Saint Mary, Γ. β. 12	Grottaferrata	Italy	
ℓ 2394	14th	Apostles^{P}	αω	8	Church of Panagia, 4, fol. 167-174	Lindos, Rhodes	Greece	
ℓ 2395	14th/ 17th	Apostles	αω	44	Ecclesiastical Historical and Archival Institute of the Patriarchate of Bulgaria, EHAI 1204	Sofia	Bulgaria	
ℓ 2396	13th/ 16th	Gospels + Apostles	αω	303	Institute of Hagiological Studies, Christou 1	Thessaloniki	Greece	
ℓ 2397	14th	Gospels	αω	12	Ecclesiastical Historical and Archival Institute of the Patriarchate of Bulgaria, 1362 (2)	Sofia	Bulgaria	
ℓ 2398	14th/15th	Gospels	αω	2	Ecclesiastical Historical and Archival Institute of the Patriarchate of Bulgaria, 1362 (4)	Sofia	Bulgaria	
ℓ 2399	16th	Gospels + Apostles	αω	2	Ecclesiastical Historical and Archival Institute of the Patriarchate of Bulgaria, 1362 (12)	Sofia	Bulgaria	
ℓ 2400	12th	Apostles	αω	192	St. Cyril and Methodius National Library, Gr. 8	Sofia	Bulgaria	

[top]

=== Lectionaries 2401–2486 ===
#	Date	Contents	Script	Pages	Institution	City, State	Country	Images
ℓ 2401	13th	Gospels^{P}	αω	1	St. Cyril and Methodius National Library, Gr. 10	Sofia	Bulgaria	
ℓ 2402	13th	Gospels^{P}	αω	9	St. Cyril and Methodius National Library, Gr. 12	Sofia	Bulgaria	
ℓ 2403	16th	Gospels	αω	296	St. Cyril and Methodius National Library, Gr. 15	Sofia	Bulgaria	
ℓ 2404	11th/12th+14th	Gospels^{e}	αω	277+49	Museum of the Bible, MOTB.MS.000469	Washington, DC	United States	
ℓ 2405	12th/13th	Gospels^{P}	αω	1	The Schøyen Collection, MS 1979/4	Oslo	Norway	
ℓ 2406	13th/14th	Gospels^{P}	αω	2	The Schøyen Collection, MS 1979/5	Oslo	Norway	
ℓ 2407	13th	Gospels^{P}	αω	4	National Library, 4729, fol. 1-2; 363-364	Madrid	Spain	
ℓ 2408	13th	Gospels^{esk}	αω	324	National Library, Vitr.. 26-4	Madrid	Spain	BNE
ℓ 2409	11th	Gospels^{P}	αω	2	Austrian National Library, Theol. Gr. 211, fol. IV 291	Vienna	Austria	
ℓ 2410	10th	Gospels^{P}	αω	3	Austrian National Library, Theol. Gr. 268, fol. II. 1.2	Vienna	Austria	
ℓ 2411	12th	Matthew^{sk-P}	αω	1	Duke University, Greek MS 089	Durham, NC	United States	DU
ℓ 2412	12th	Gospels	αω	276	Duke University, Greek MS 092	Durham, NC	United States	DU
ℓ 2413	10th	Gospels^{P}	ΑΩ	2	The Schøyen Collection, MS 2858	Oslo	Norway	
ℓ 2414	11th-12th	Gospels^{esk}	αω	132	Yale University Library, Beinecke MS 1111	New Haven, CT	United States	YU
ℓ 2415	12th	Gospels^{P}	αω	2	Harvard University, MS Typ 267	Cambridge, MA	United States	
ℓ 2415	12th	Gospels^{P}	αω	1	The Schøyen Collection, MS 2933, fol. 105	Oslo	Norway	
ℓ 2415	12th	Gospels^{P}	αω	2	Owner Unknown			
ℓ 2416	11th	Gospels^{sk}	αω	24	Owner Anonymous, San Marco d'Alunzio/ Messina, Cod. Haluntinus, gr. 1			
ℓ 2417	10th/11th	Gospels^{P}	αω	3	Historical Museum of Crete	Crete	Greece	
ℓ 2418	1330	Apostles	αω	39	Ivan Dujcev Center for Slavo-Byzantine Studies, 193, fol. 335-373	Sofia	Bulgaria	
ℓ 2419	12th	Gospels^{P}	αω	3	Esphigmenou Monastery, 31, fol. 289-291	Mount Athos	Greece	
ℓ 2420	12th	Gospels^{P}	αω	1	Agiou Pavlou Monastery, 5, fol. 148-149	Mount Athos	Greece	
ℓ 2421	9th/10th	Gospels^{P}	ΑΩ	3	Jagiellonian Library, Graec. Oct. 3, fol. 267-269	Kraków	Poland	INTF
ℓ 2422	11th	Gospels	αω	300	Vatopedi Monastery, Skevophylakion, 3	Mount Athos	Greece	
ℓ 2423	11th	Gospels	αω	76	Vatopedi Monastery, Skevophylakion, 4	Mount Athos	Greece	
ℓ 2424	11th	Gospels	αω	325	Vatopedi Monastery, Skevophylakion, 5	Mount Athos	Greece	
ℓ 2425	11th/12th	Gospels	αω	298	Vatopedi Monastery, Skevophylakion, 6	Mount Athos	Greece	
ℓ 2426	12th	Gospels	αω	363	Vatopedi Monastery, Skevophylakion, 7	Mount Athos	Greece	
ℓ 2427	12th	Gospels	αω	244	Vatopedi Monastery, Skevophylakion, 8	Mount Athos	Greece	
ℓ 2428	13th	Gospels	αω	344	Vatopedi Monastery, Skevophylakion, 12	Mount Athos	Greece	
ℓ 2429	1341	Gospels	αω	395	Vatopedi Monastery, Skevophylakion, 16	Mount Athos	Greece	
ℓ 2430	1444	Gospels	αω	301	Vatopedi Monastery, Skevophylakion, 18	Mount Athos	Greece	
ℓ 2431	17th	Gospels	αω	268	Vatopedi Monastery, Skevophylakion, 19	Mount Athos	Greece	
ℓ 2432	1668	Gospels	αω	184	Vatopedi Monastery, Skevophylakion, 21	Mount Athos	Greece	
ℓ 2433	12th/13th	Gospels^{sk-P}	αω	4	Jagiellonian Library, Graec. Oct. 3, fol. I-IV	Kraków	Poland	
ℓ 2434	14th/15th	Gospels^{P}	αω	4	Dunham Bible Museum, Houston Baptist University, 2011.65	Houston, TX	United States	CSNTM
ℓ 2435	10th	Gospels^{P}	ΑΩ	1	Vatopedi Monastery, 866, fol. I-IV	Mount Athos	Greece	
ℓ 2436	10th	Gospels^{P}	ΑΩ	2	Corpus Christi College, 30, fol. 1-2	Oxford	United Kingdom	
ℓ 2437	12th	Luke 8:47-56; 10:25-30; 14:19-24; 17:12-19; 18:10-14, 18-19; 19:2-10	αω	3	State Library, Fragmenta Graeca	Trier	Germany	INTF
ℓ 2438	14th?	Gospels	αω	?	Kerkyra	Corfu	Greece	
ℓ 2439	11th	Gospels	αω	284	National Archives of Albania, Kod. Vl. 7	Tirana	Albania	CSNTM
ℓ 2440	12th	Gospels	αω	253	National Archives of Albania, Kod. Vl. 11	Tirana	Albania	CSNTM
ℓ 2441	13th	Gospels	αω	320	National Archives of Albania, Kod. Br. 13	Tirana	Albania	CSNTM
ℓ 2442	13th	Gospels	αω	161	National Archives of Albania, Kod. Br. 16	Tirana	Albania	CSNTM
ℓ 2443	15th	Gospels	αω	198	National Archives of Albania, Kod. Br. 77	Tirana	Albania	CSNTM
ℓ 2444	13th	Gospels	αω	95	National Archives of Albania, Kod. Br. 88	Tirana	Albania	CSNTM
ℓ 2445	14th	Gospels	αω	53	National Archives of Albania, Kod. Br. 89	Tirana	Albania	CSNTM
ℓ 2446	11th/12th	Gospels	αω	333	Iviron Monastery, 1404	Mount Athos	Greece	
ℓ 2447	11th/14th	Gospels	αω	345	National Archives of Albania, Kod. Br. 8	Tirana	Albania	CSNTM
ℓ 2448	1322	Gospels	αω	187	National Archives of Albania, Kod. Br. 36	Tirana	Albania	CSNTM
ℓ 2449	14th?	Gospels	αω	254	National Archives of Albania, Kod. Br. 24	Tirana	Albania	CSNTM
ℓ 2450	9th	Gospels	ΑΩ	2	Chester Beatty Library, CBL ARM 624	Dublin	Ireland	CSNTM
ℓ 2450	9th	Gospels	ΑΩ	1	Mesrop Mashtots Institute of Ancient Manuscripts, Frg. 15	Yerevan	Armenia	
ℓ 2451	8th	Gospels^{P}	ΑΩ P^{U}	5	State and University Library, msc 11	Bremen	Germany	
ℓ 2452	12th/13th	Gospels^{e-P}	αω	2	Sherborne School	Sherborne	United Kingdom	
ℓ 2453	10th	Gospels^{P}	ΑΩ P^{U}	1	Monastery of Saint John the Theologian, MS 225	Patmos	Greece	CSNTM
ℓ 2454	14th	Gospels	αω	9	National Archives of Albania, Fr. Vs. 16	Tirana	Albania	CSNTM
ℓ 2455	13th	Gospels	αω	50	National Archives of Albania, Fr. Br. 2	Tirana	Albania	CSNTM
ℓ 2456	14th	Gospels	αω	52	National Archives of Albania, Fr. Br. 5	Tirana	Albania	CSNTM
ℓ 2457	11th	Gospels	αω P^{U}	2	Benaki Museum, Benaki TA 144	Athens	Greece	CSNTM
ℓ 2458	1127	Gospels^{P}	αω	160	Benaki Museum, Benaki TA 314	Athens	Greece	CSNTM
ℓ 2459	12th/13th	Gospels^{P}	αω	207	Benaki Museum, Benaki TA 322	Athens	Greece	CSNTM
ℓ 2460	11th	Gospels^{P}	αω	400	Museum of Literature, MS 7030	Iasi	Romania	CSNTM
ℓ 2461	11th	Gospels^{e}	αω	142	Great Lavra Monastery, Skev. Phokas	Mount Athos	Greece	
ℓ 2462	13th	Gospels^{e}	αω	229	Karakallou Monastery, 252	Mount Athos	Greece	MAR
ℓ 2463	11th	Gospels^{e}	αω	1	Columbia Univ., Rare Book and Manuscript Library, Plimpton MS 14 (cover folio)	New York, NY	United States	
ℓ 2464	10th		αω	2	British Library, Add MS 73525, fol. 1-2	London	United Kingdom	BL
ℓ 2465	10th/11th	Gospels^{P}	ΑΩ	2	National Center of Manuscripts, Gr. 26	Tbilisi	Georgia	CSNTM
ℓ 2466	14th	Hebrews 13:18-21; 1Cor 12:27-13:8; 1 John 1:1-7	αω	2 fol.	National Library of Greece, NLG 158 (front)	Athens	Greece	CSNTM
ℓ 2467	12th	Apostles^{P}	αω	27	National Library of Greece, NLG 158 (back)	Athens	Greece	CSNTM
ℓ 2468	15th	Gospels + Apostles^{Lit}	αω	264	National Library of Greece, NLG 1910	Athens	Greece	CSNTM
ℓ 2469	15th	Gospels + Apostles	αω	64	National Library of Greece, NLG 3534	Athens	Greece	CSNTM
ℓ 2470	1707	Gospels	αω	179 fol.	National Library of Greece, NLG 4002	Athens	Greece	CSNTM
ℓ 2471	16th	Gospels + Apostles^{Lit}	αω	307	National Library of Greece, NLG 2064	Athens	Greece	CSNTM
ℓ 2472	15th?	Gospels^{Lit}	αω	10	National Library of Greece, NLG 2065	Athens	Greece	CSNTM
ℓ 2473	1683	Gospels + Apostles^{Lit}	αω	117	National Library of Greece, NLG 2791	Athens	Greece	CSNTM
ℓ 2474	13th-14th	Gospels^{esk}	αω	196	National Library of Greece, NLG 4074	Athens	Greece	CSNTM
ℓ 2475	16th	Gospels^{Lit}	αω	321	Lambeth Palace, MS. Sion L40.2/G10	London	United Kingdom	
ℓ 2476	1645	Gospels + Apostles^{Lit}	αω	21	Lambeth Palace, MS. Sion L40.2/G12, fol. 65r-85r	London	United Kingdom	
ℓ 2477	1592?	Gospels	αω	277	Greek Orthodox Patriarchate, 290	Alexandria	Egypt	
ℓ 2478	10th	Gospels^{P}	αω	2	Greek Orthodox Patriarchate, 56	Alexandria	Egypt	
ℓ 2479	13th	Gospels	αω	271	Greek Orthodox Patriarchate, 108	Alexandria	Egypt	
ℓ 2480	10th	†Gospels^{esk}	Αω	48	Herzogin Anna Amalia Library, Fol. 531	Weimar	Germany	HAAL
ℓ 2481	11th-12th	Gospels^{P}	αω	1	Herzogin Anna Amalia Library, Q 738	Weimar	Germany	HAAL
ℓ 2482	11th-12th	Gospels^{e}	αω	220	Herzogin Anna Amalia Library, Fol. 532	Weimar	Germany	HAAL
ℓ 2483	16th-17th	Gospels + Apostles^{sel}	αω	60	National Library of Greece, 4174, fol. 104-163	Athens	Greece	
ℓ 2484	13th	Mark 1:38-39, 44; 2:2-3, 5-6, 11-12.	αω P^{U}	1	Trinity College, MS. O.9.27, flyleaf	Cambridge	United Kingdom	TC
ℓ 2485	11th-12th	John 17:2-13	αω	1	Ecclesiastical Historical and Archival Institute of the Patriarchate of Bulgaria, EHAI 858	Sofia	Bulgaria	
ℓ 2486	12th	Gospels^{sk}	αω	4	Ecclesiastical Historical and Archival Institute of the Patriarchate of Bulgaria, EHAI 909	Sofia	Bulgaria	

[top]

== Gallery ==
=== Uncial Lectionaries ===
Photos of Uncial Lectionaries

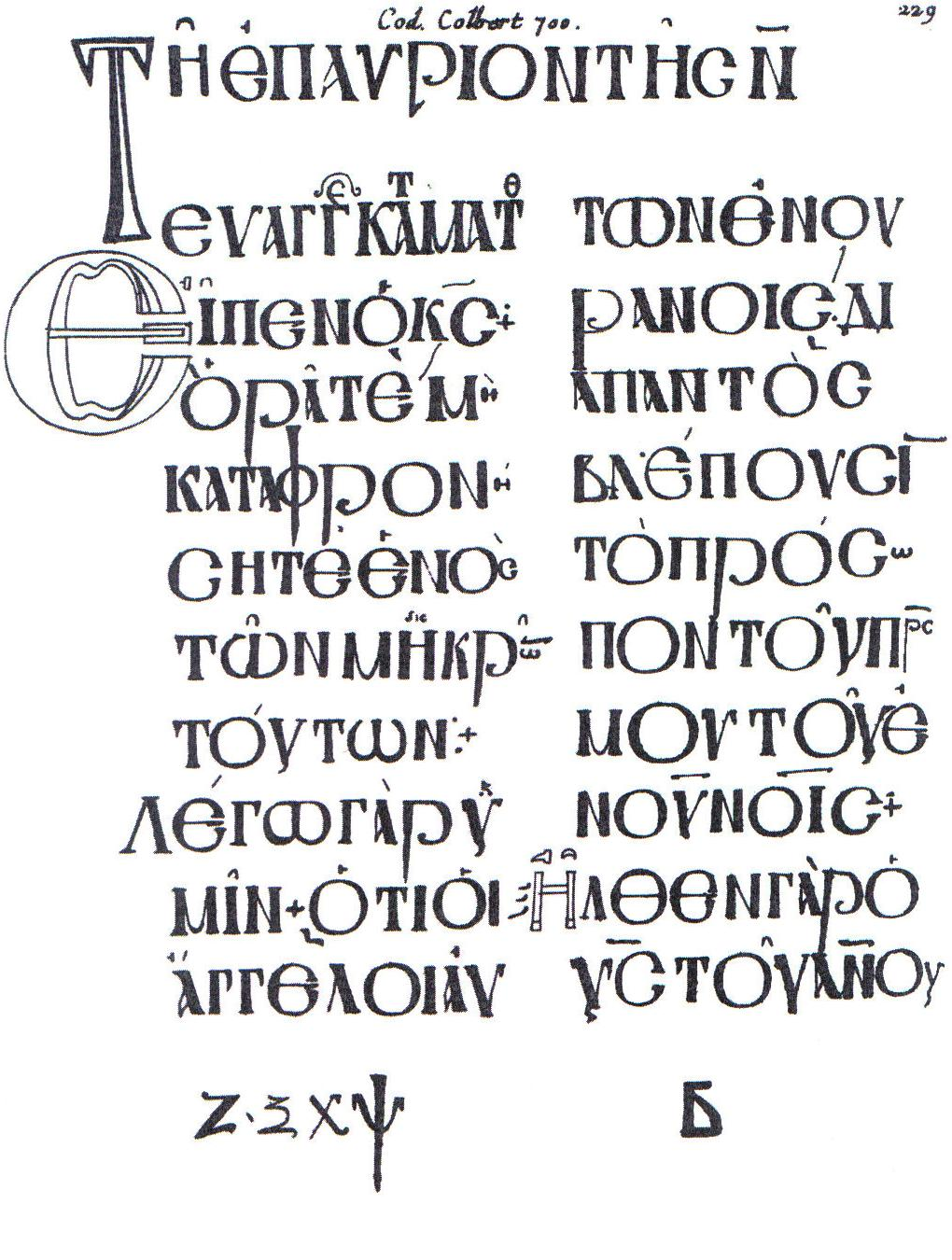
ℓ 1

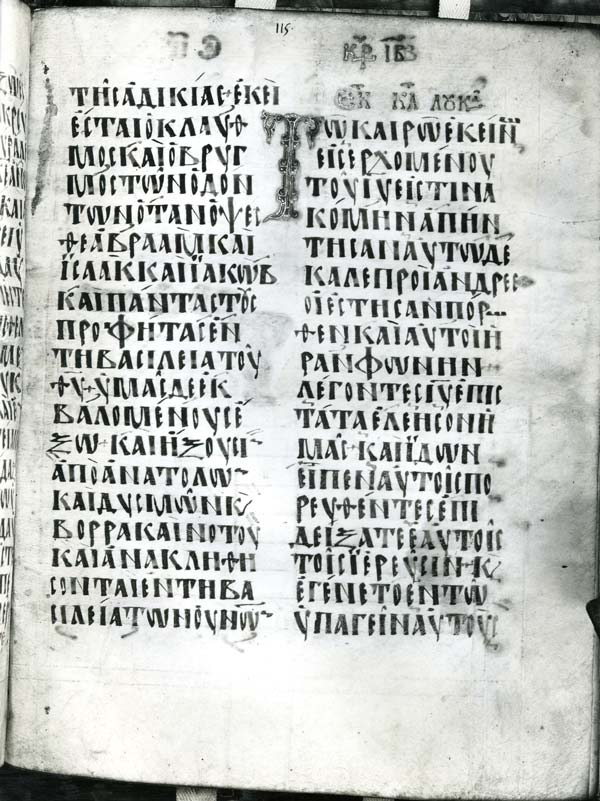
ℓ 5

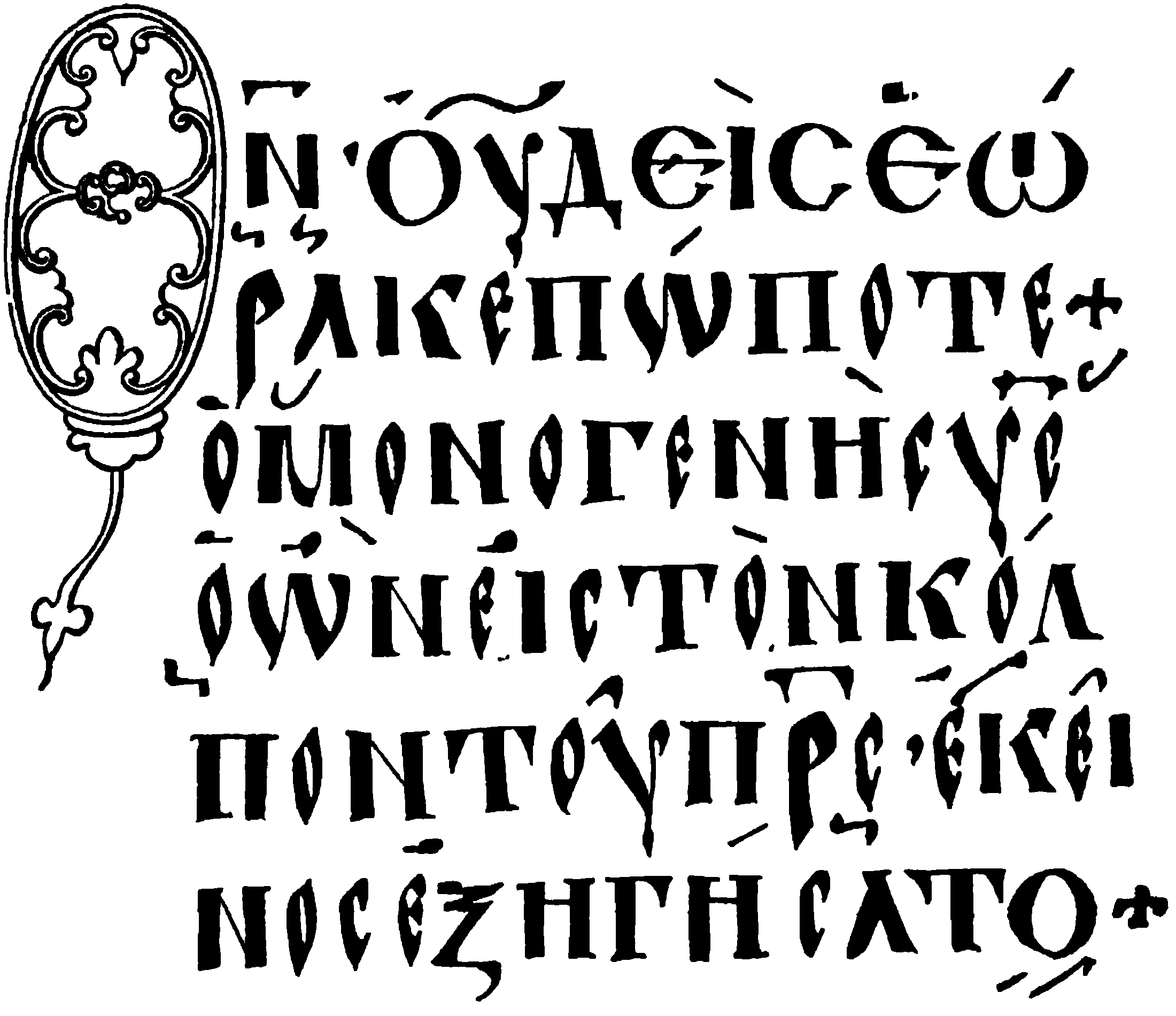
ℓ 150

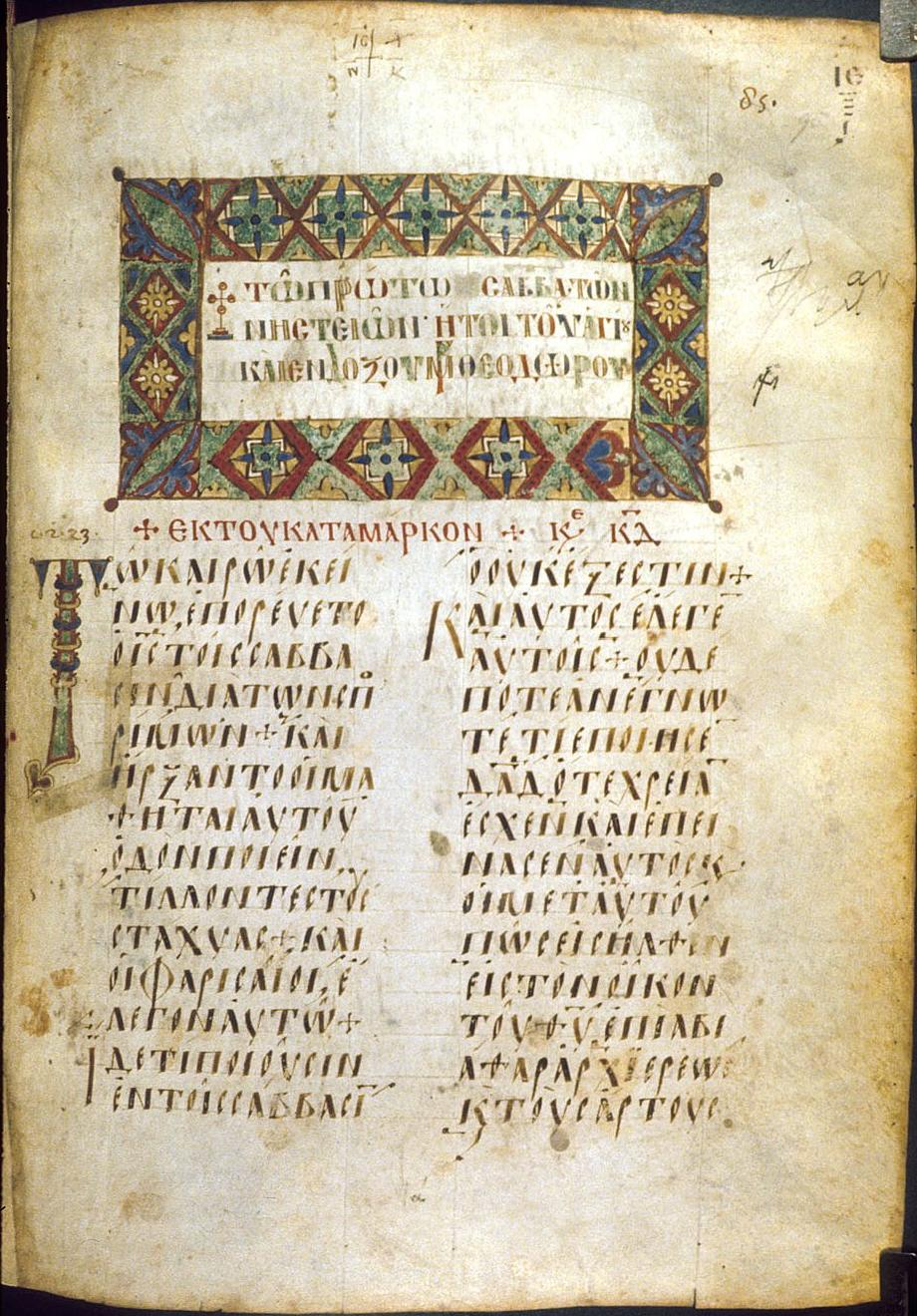
ℓ 152

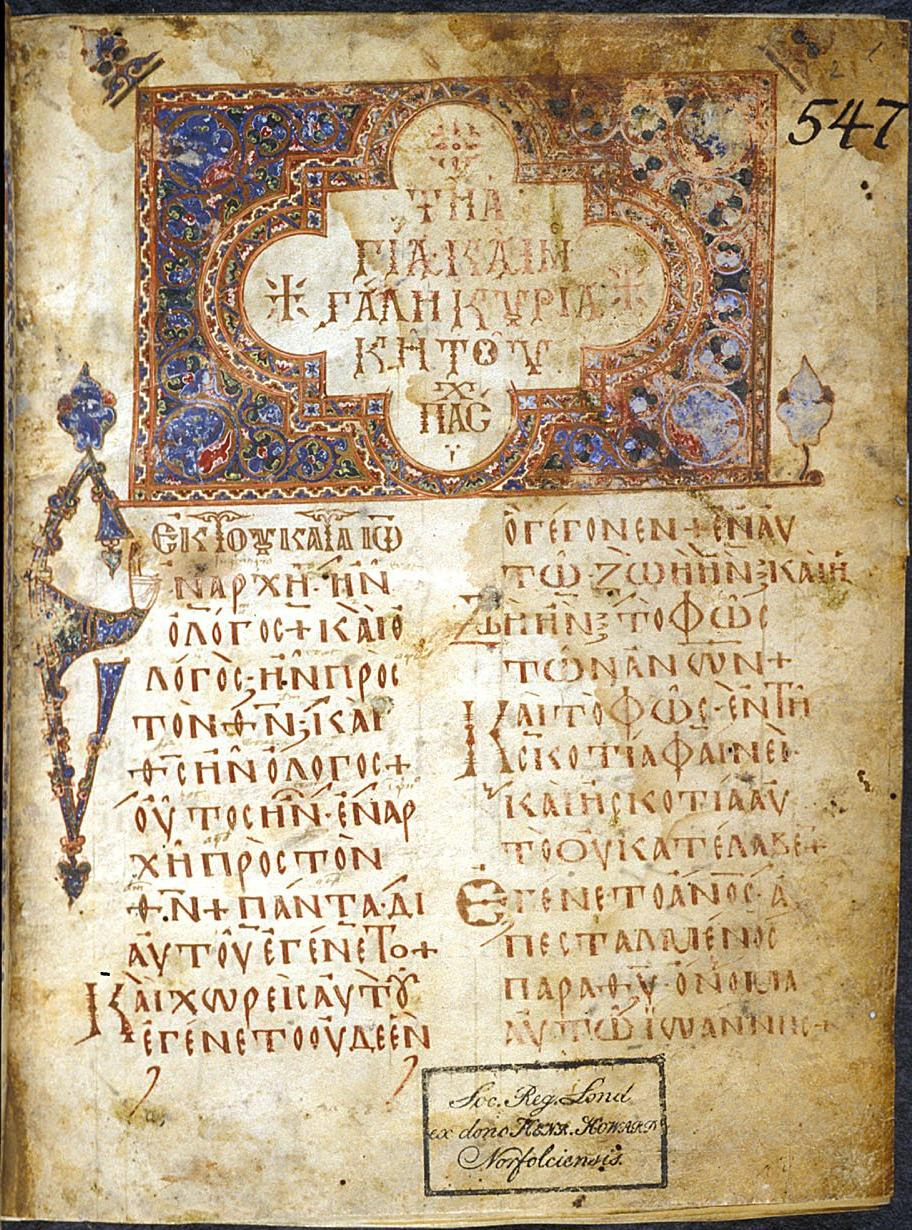
ℓ 183 folio 2

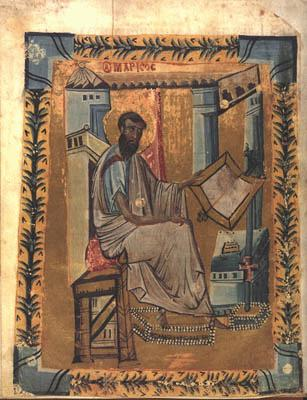
ℓ 243

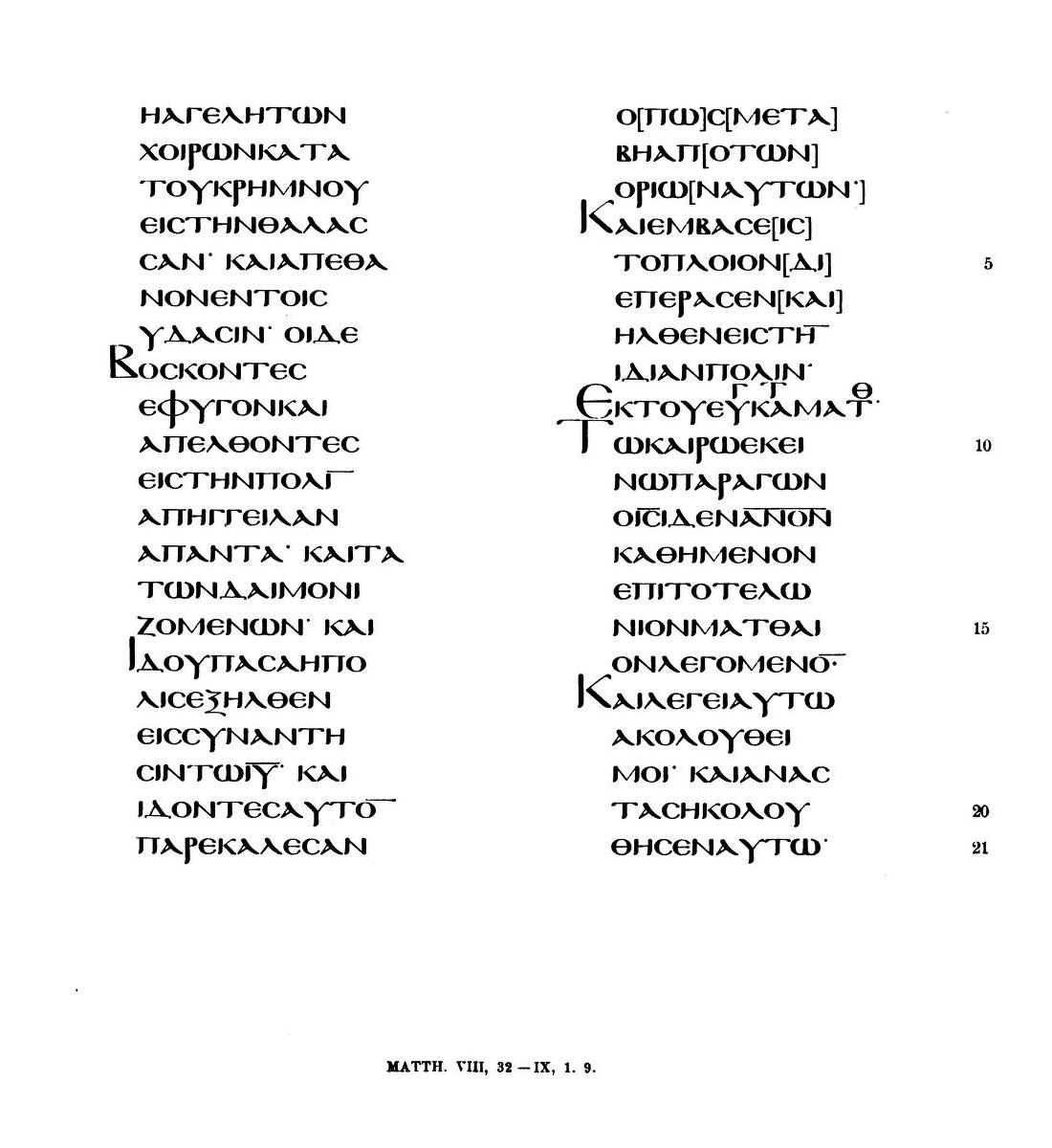
ℓ 269

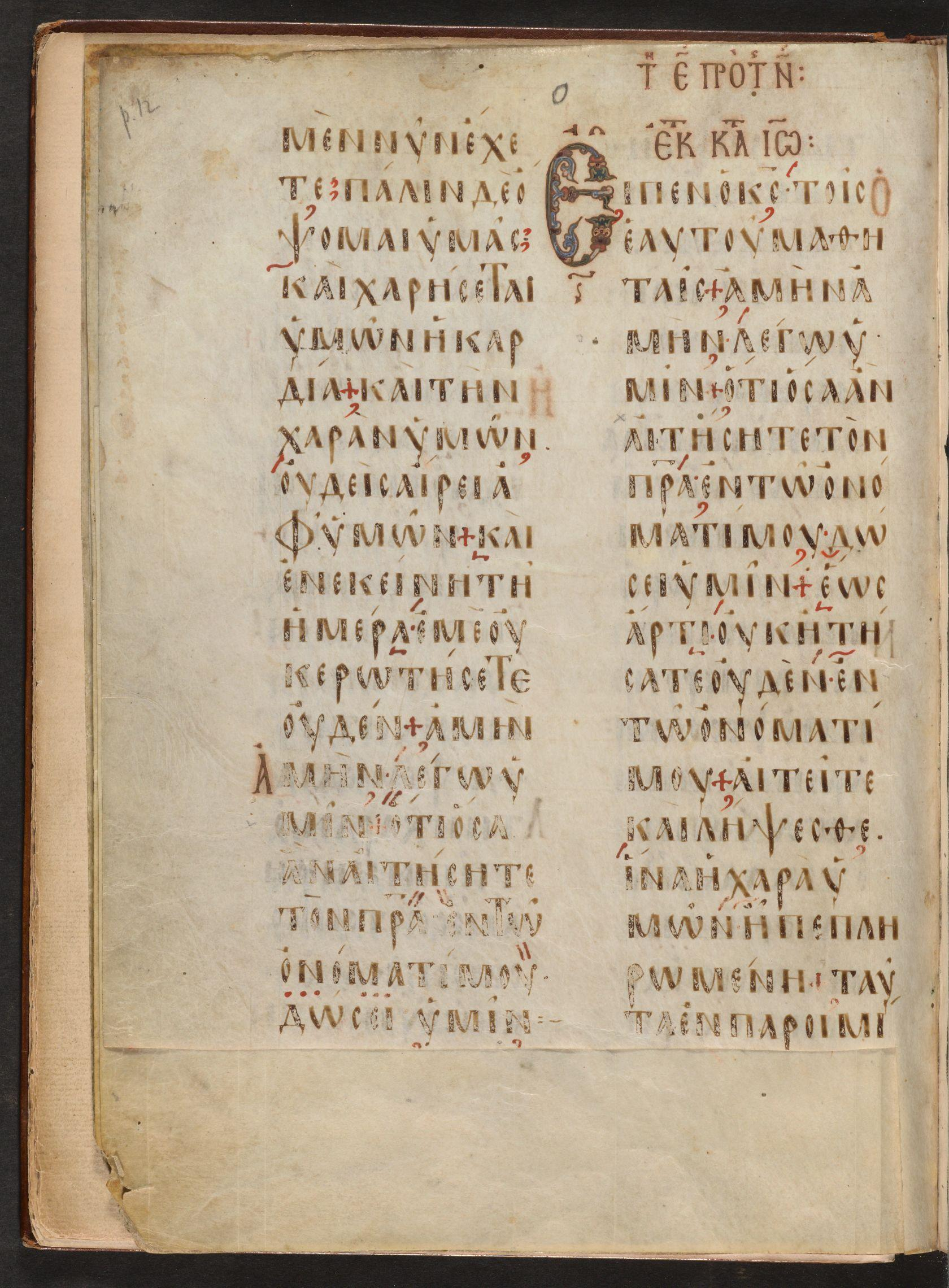
ℓ 296 folio 6 verso

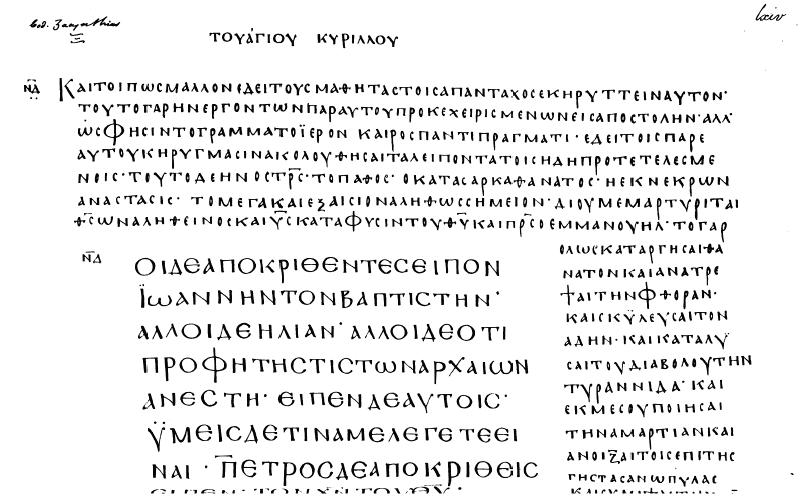
ℓ 299

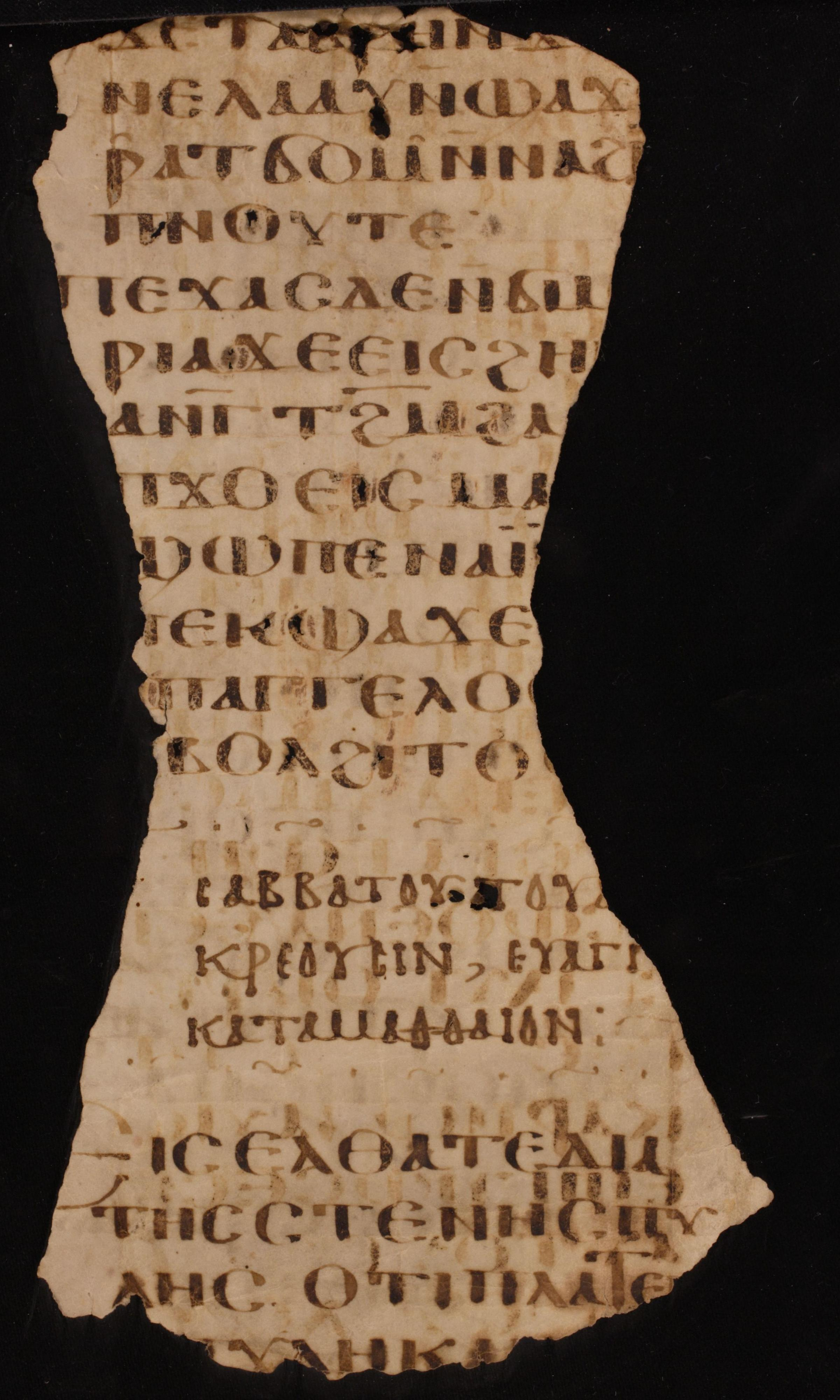
ℓ 1602 The only folio

=== Minuscule Lectionaries ===
Photos of Minuscule Lectionaries

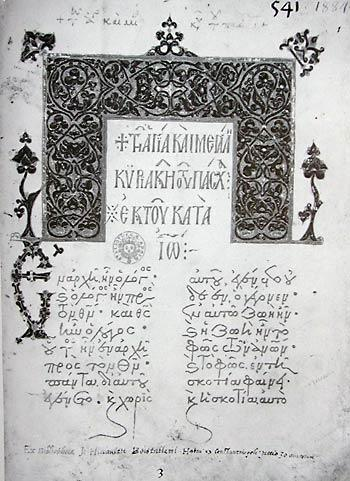
ℓ 86

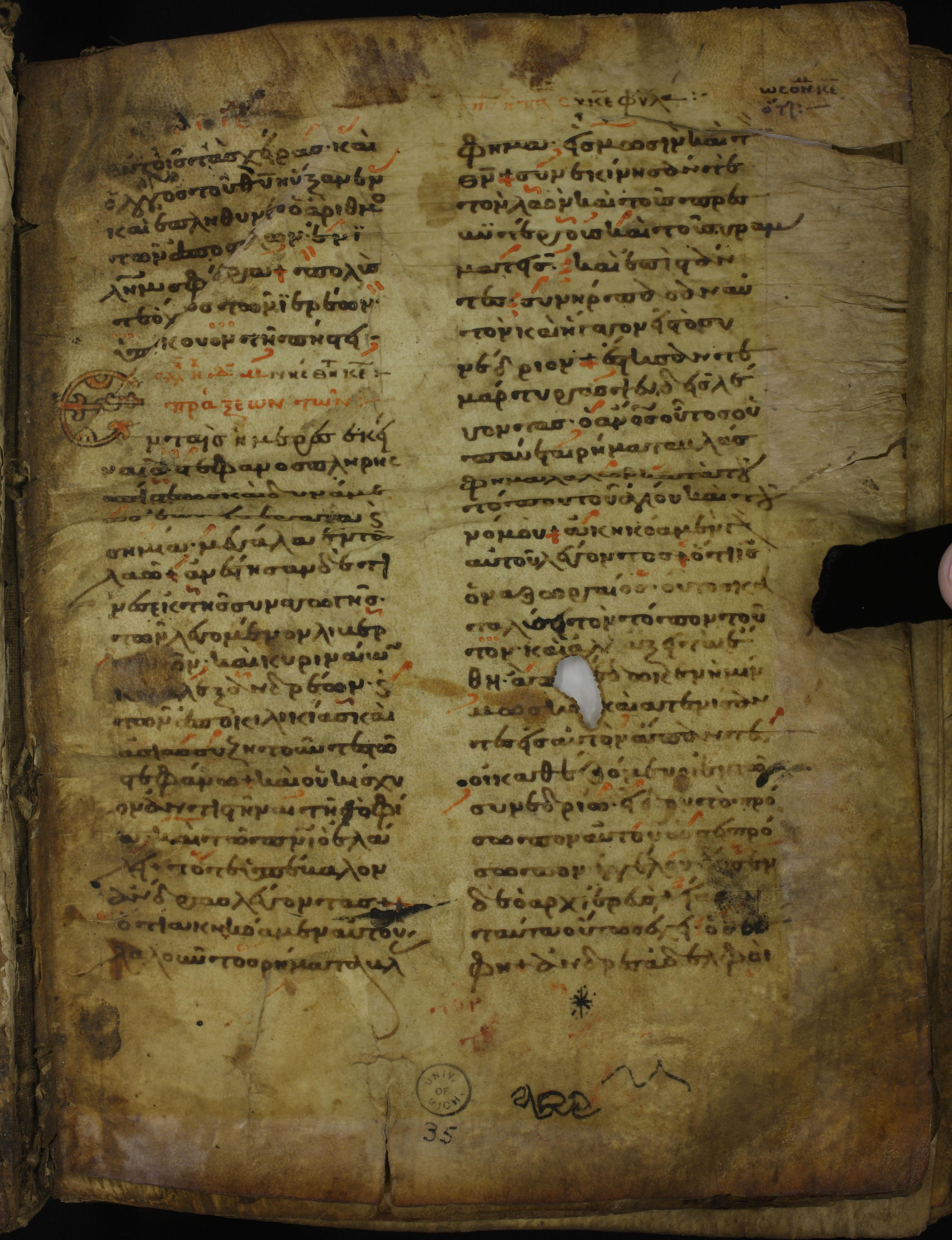
ℓ 170

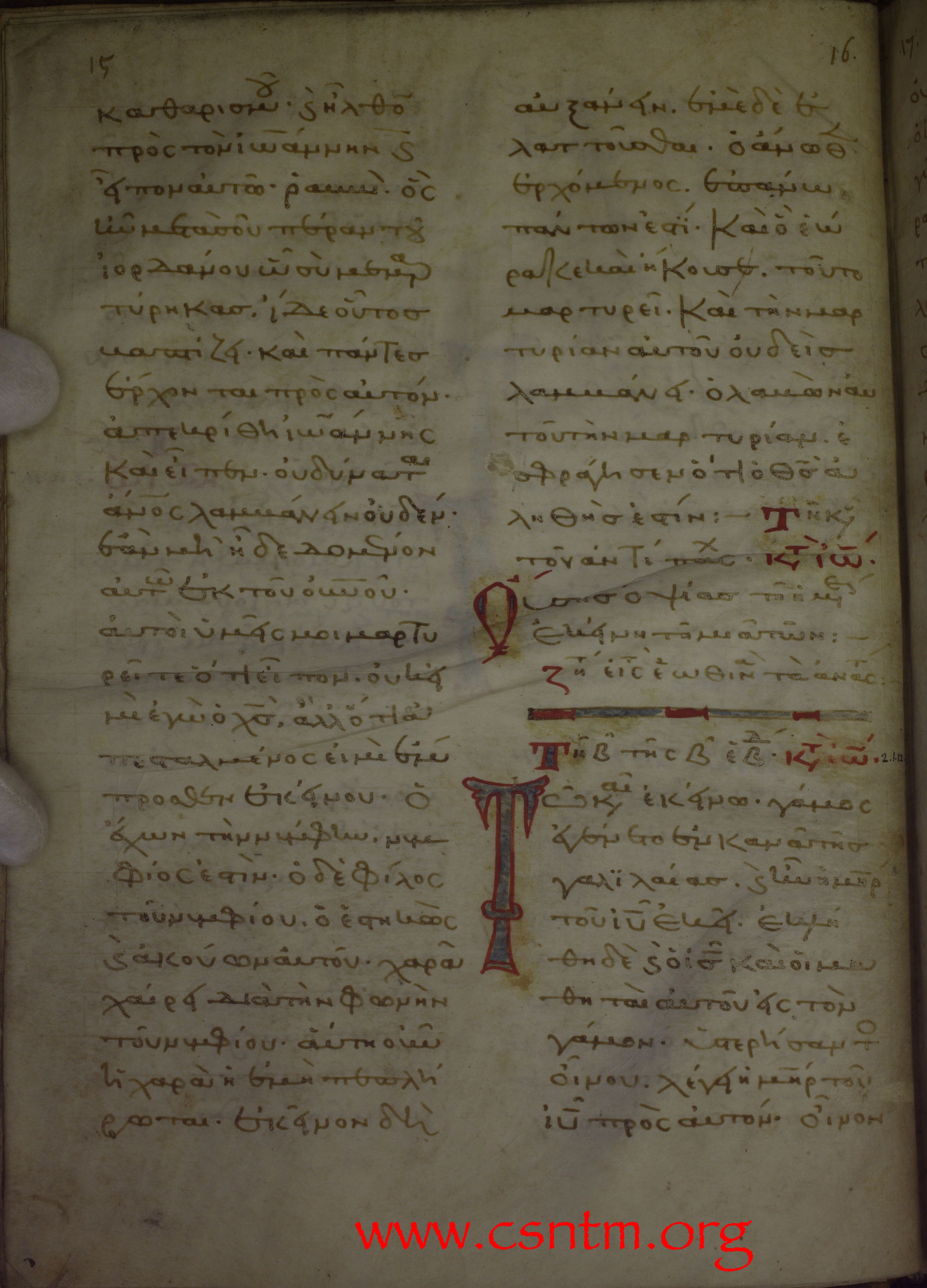
ℓ 185

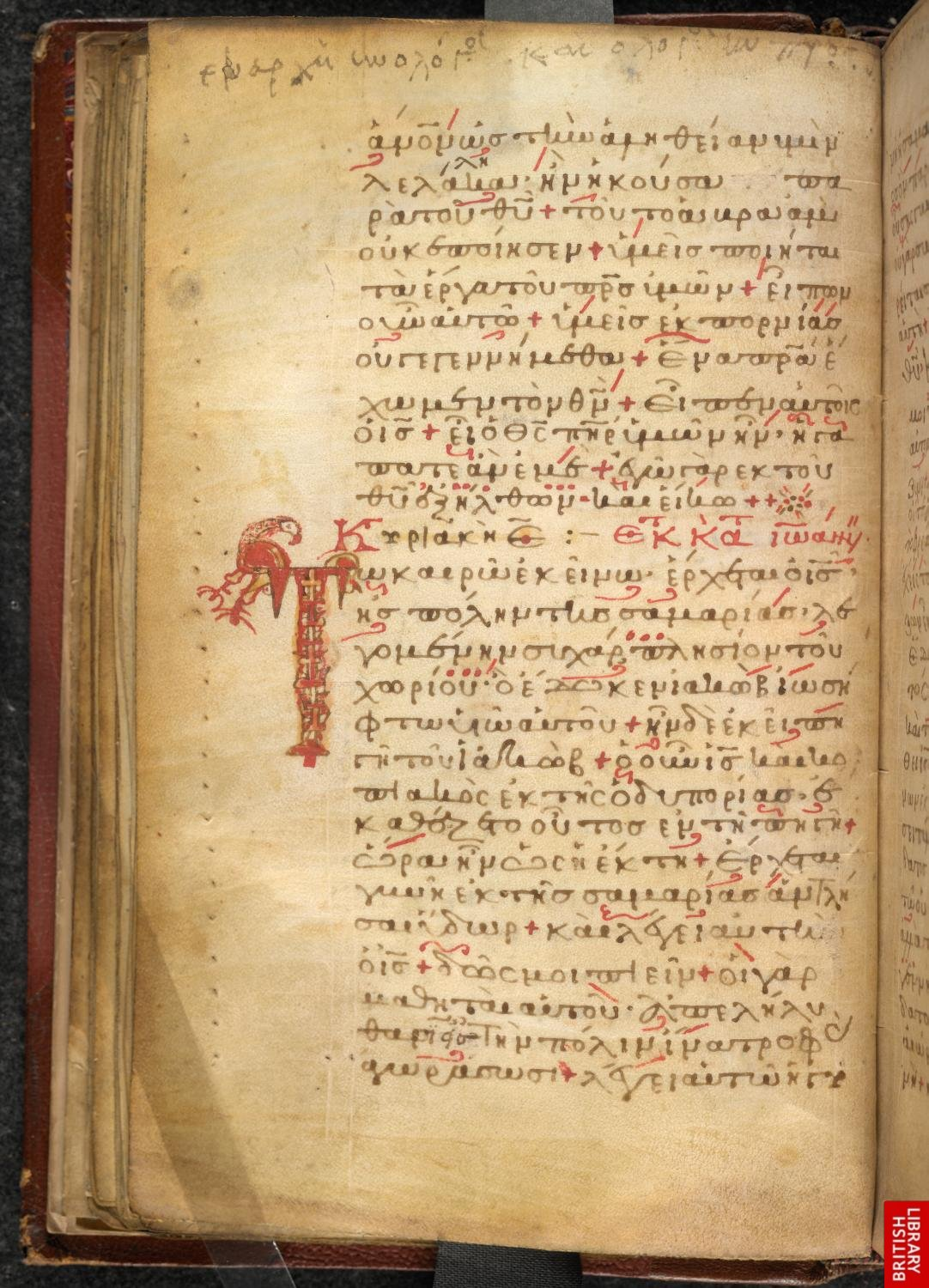
ℓ 187

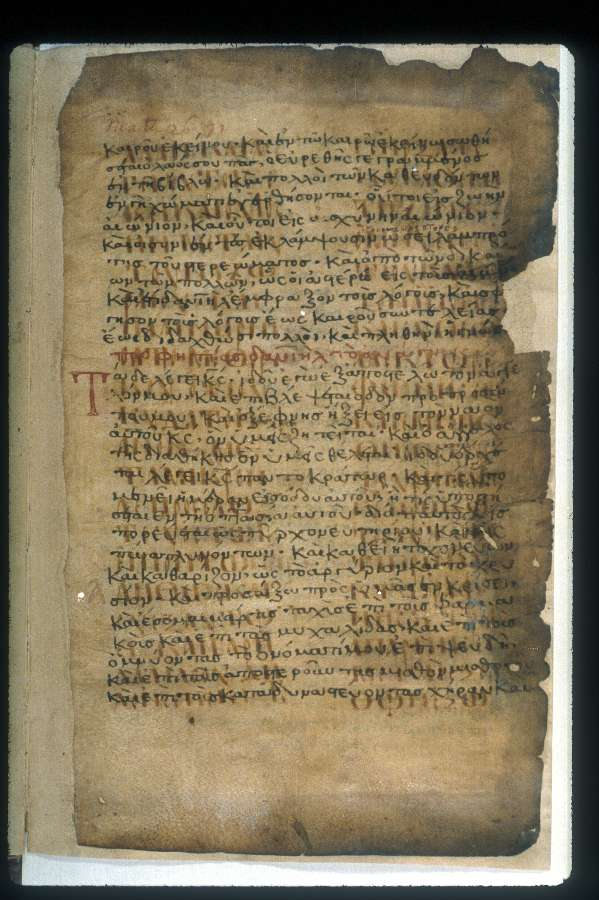
ℓ 205 Palimpsest

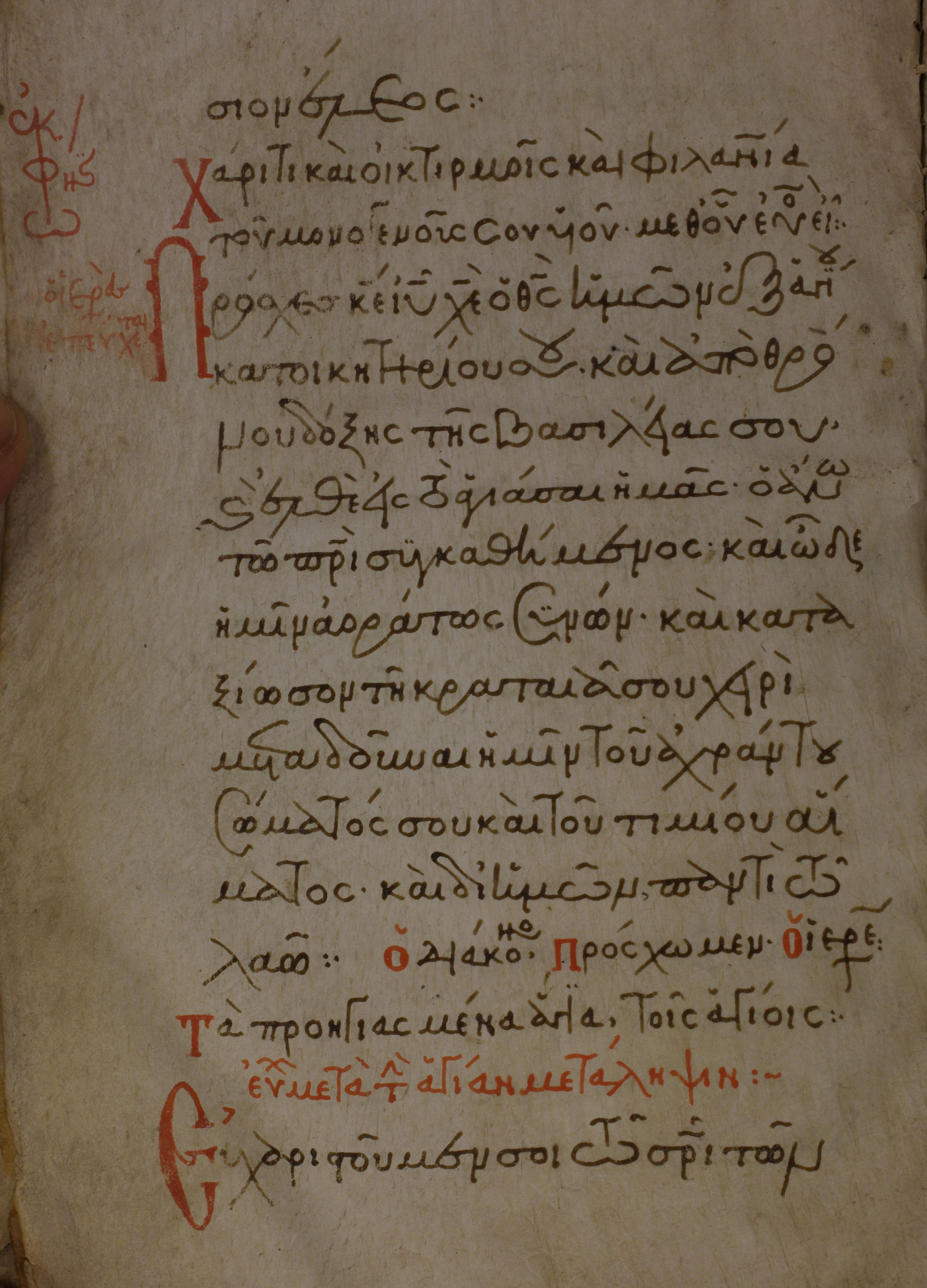
ℓ 216 folio 54

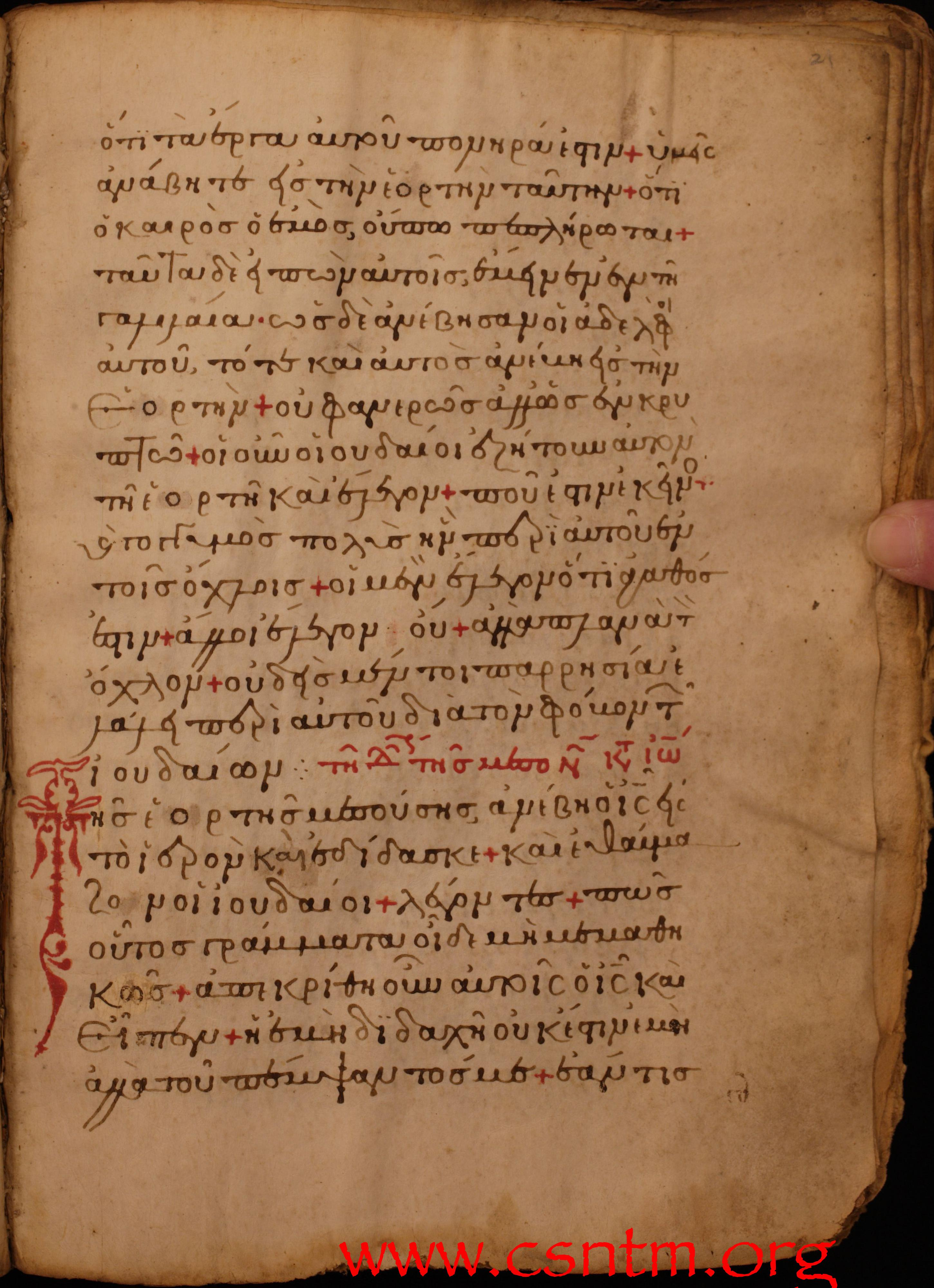
ℓ 220 folio 21 recto

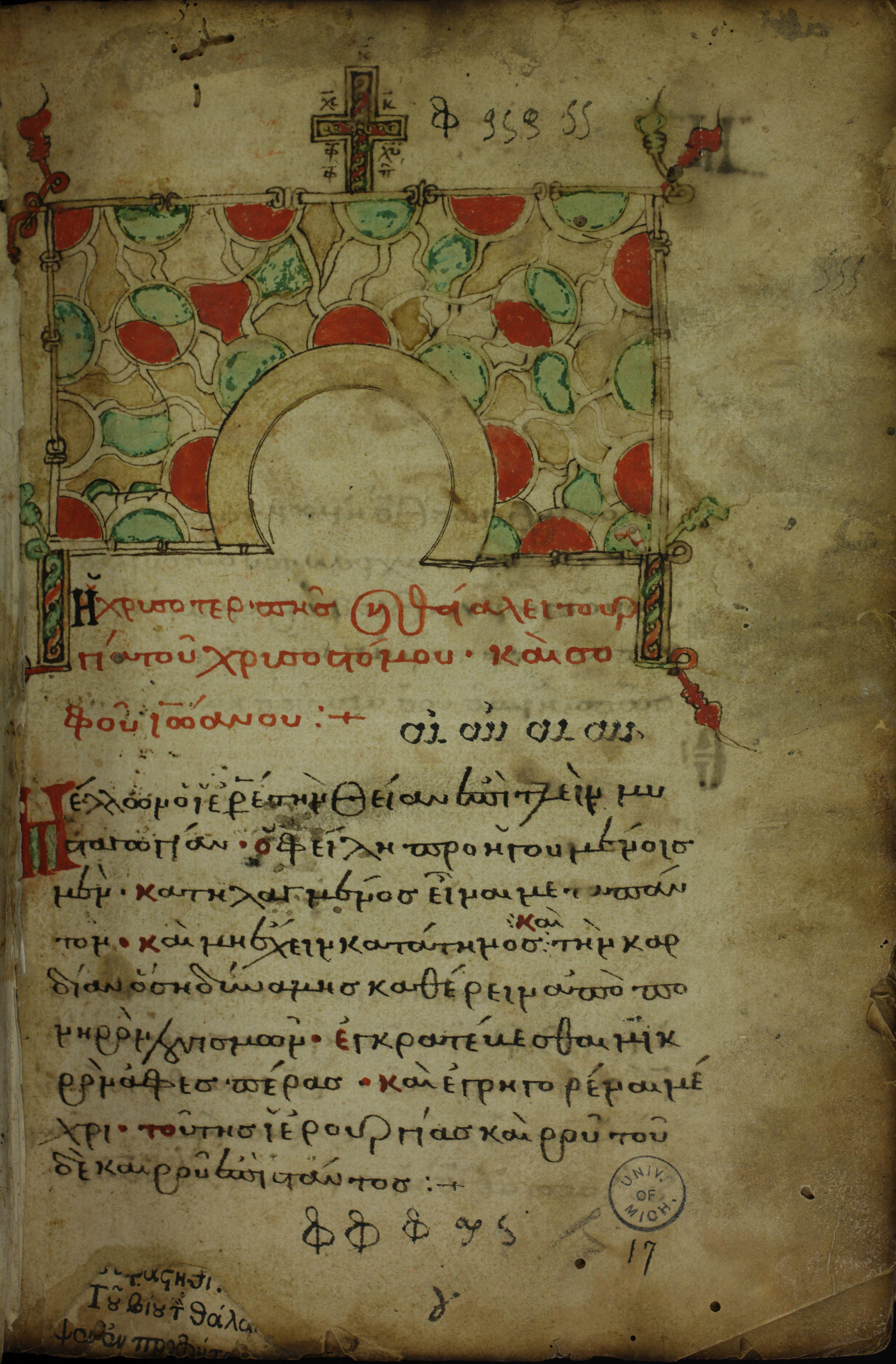
ℓ 223

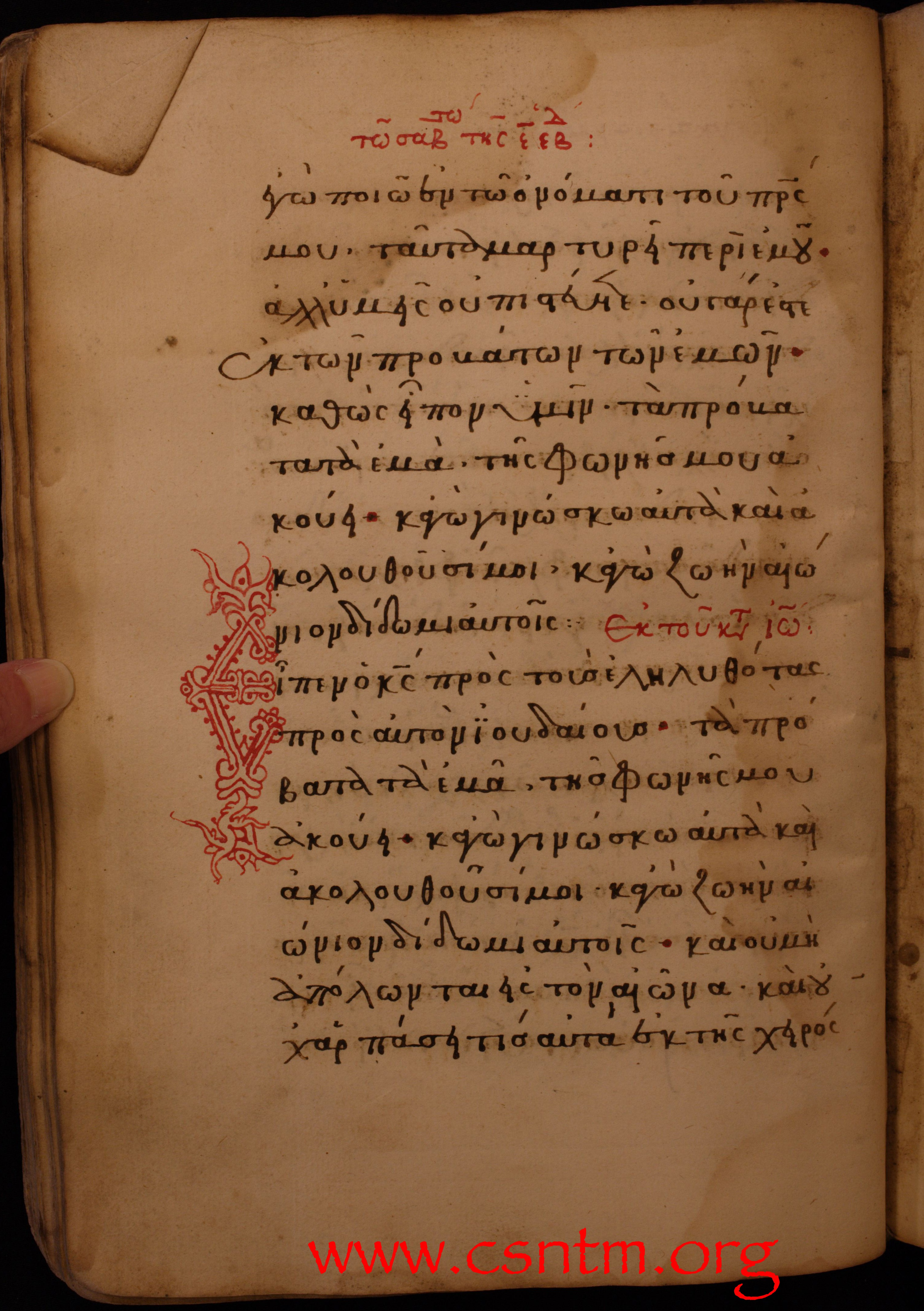
ℓ 225 folio 43 verso

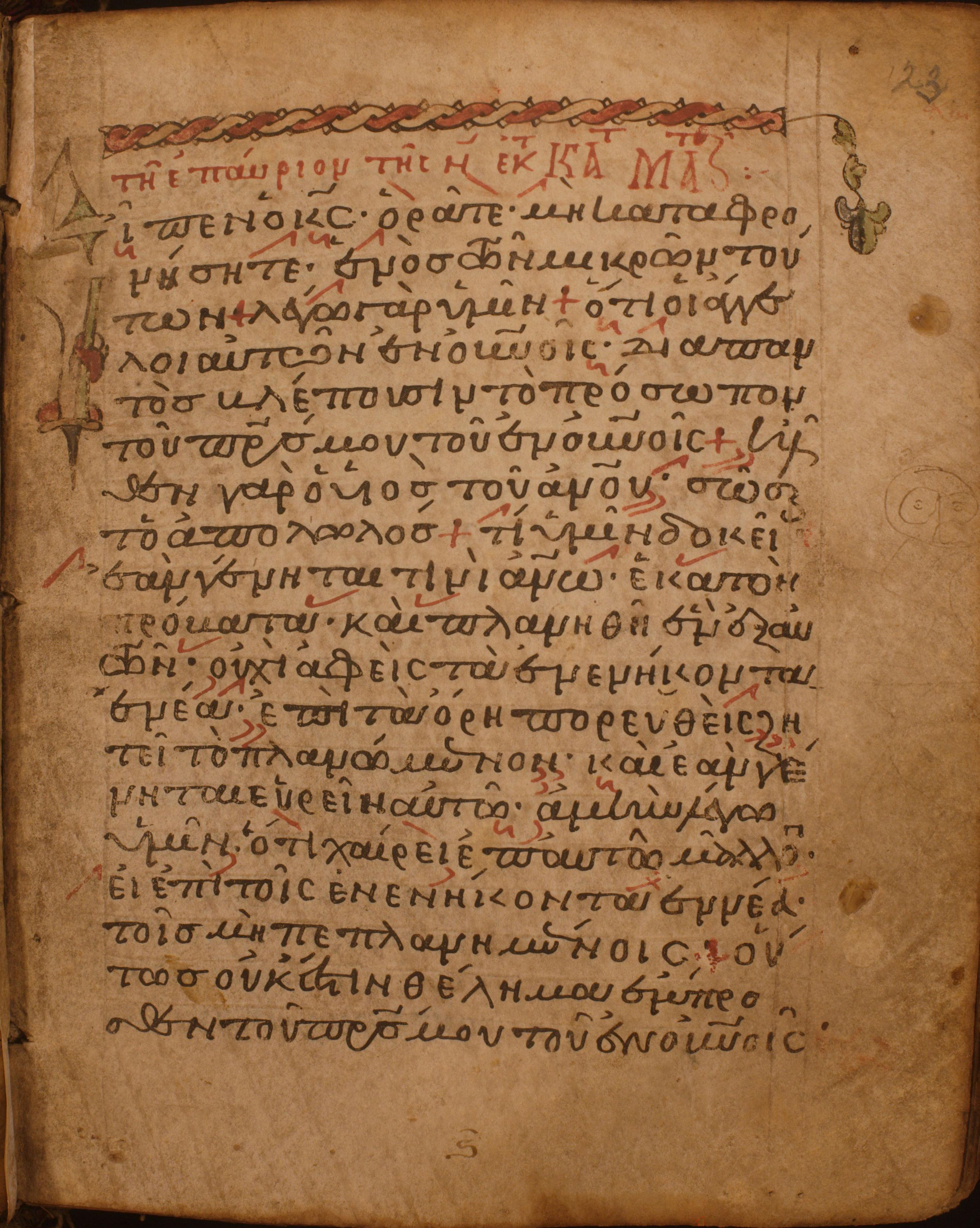
ℓ 226 folio 25 recto

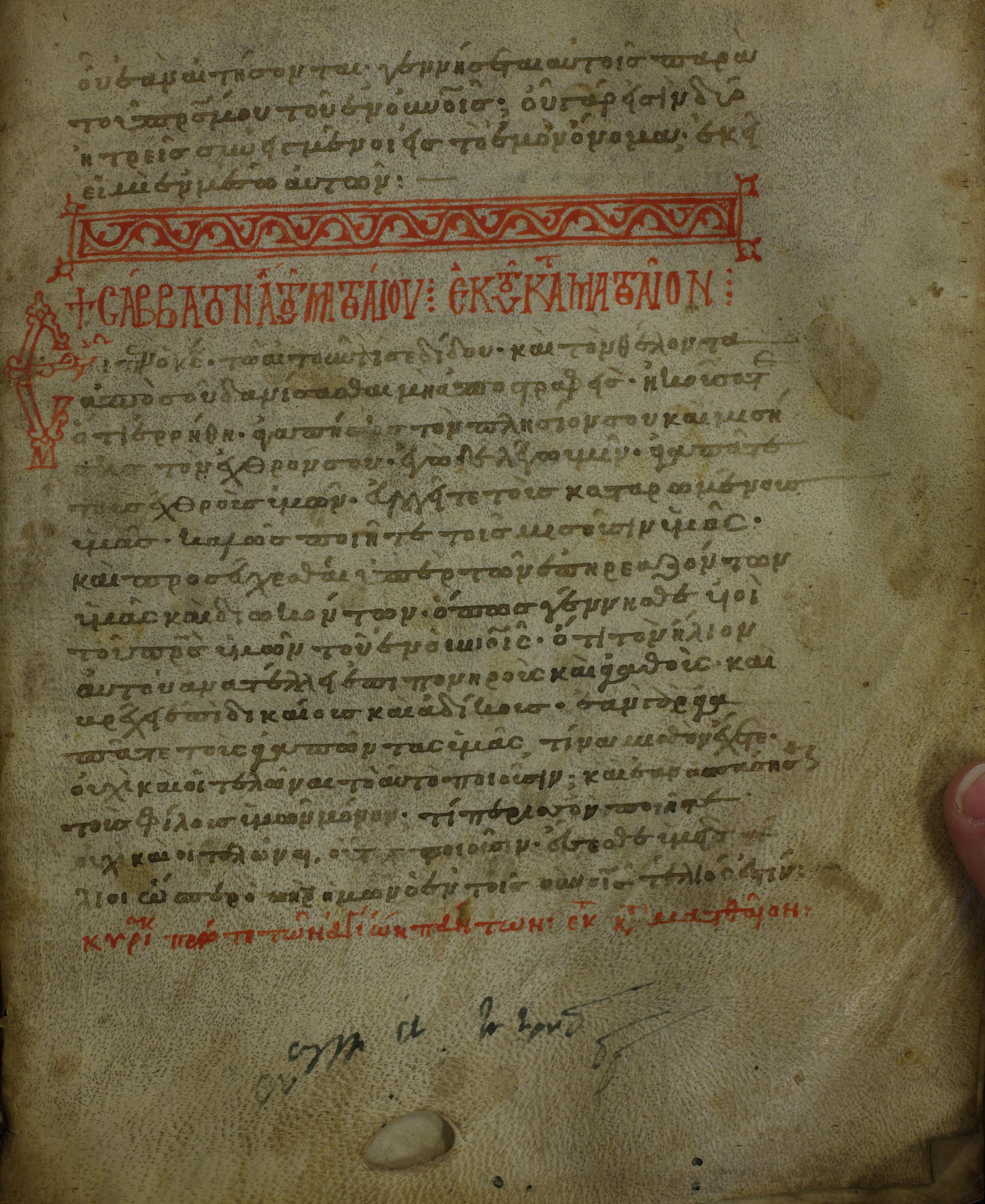
ℓ 227 folio 6 recto

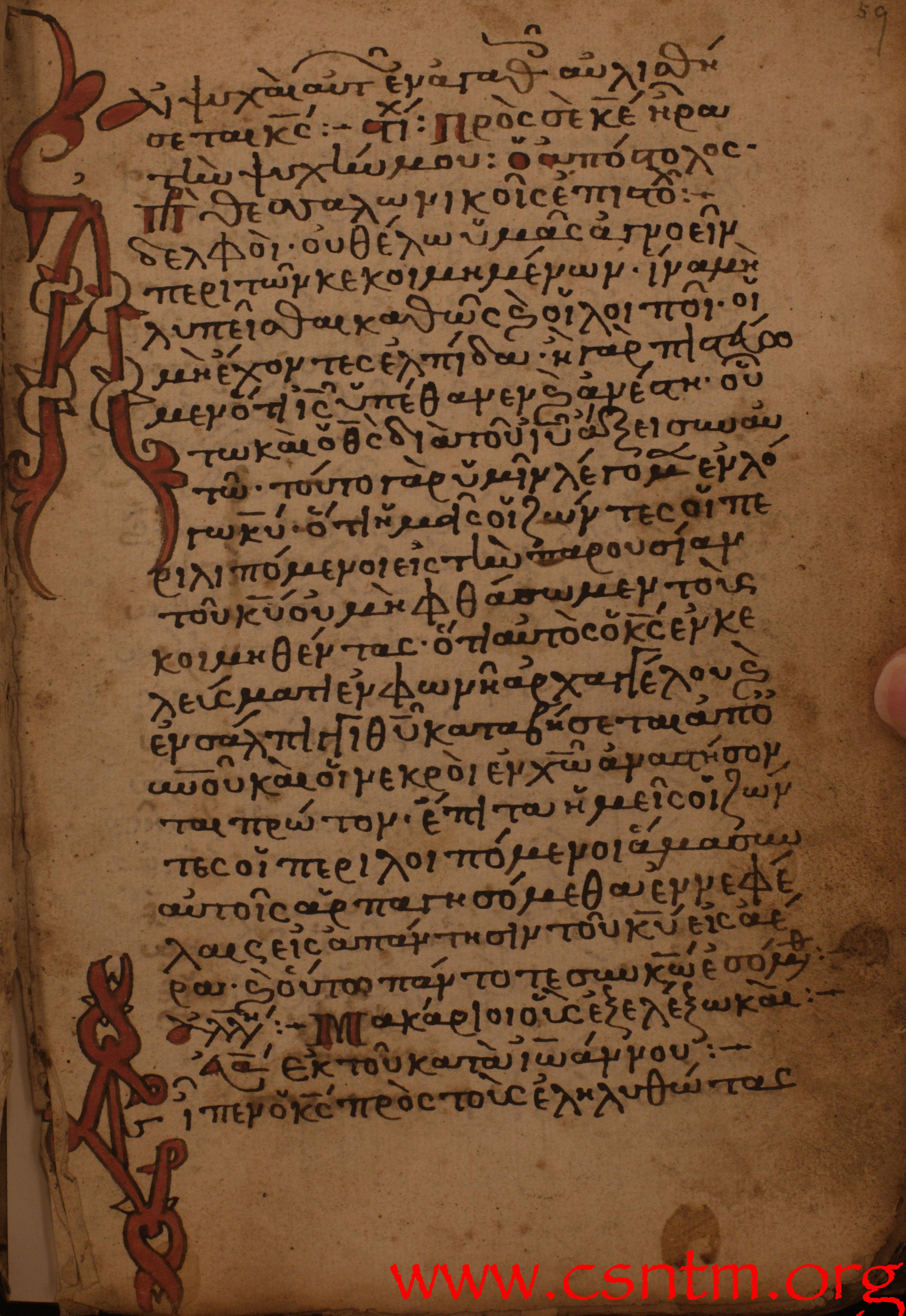
ℓ 228 folio 63 recto

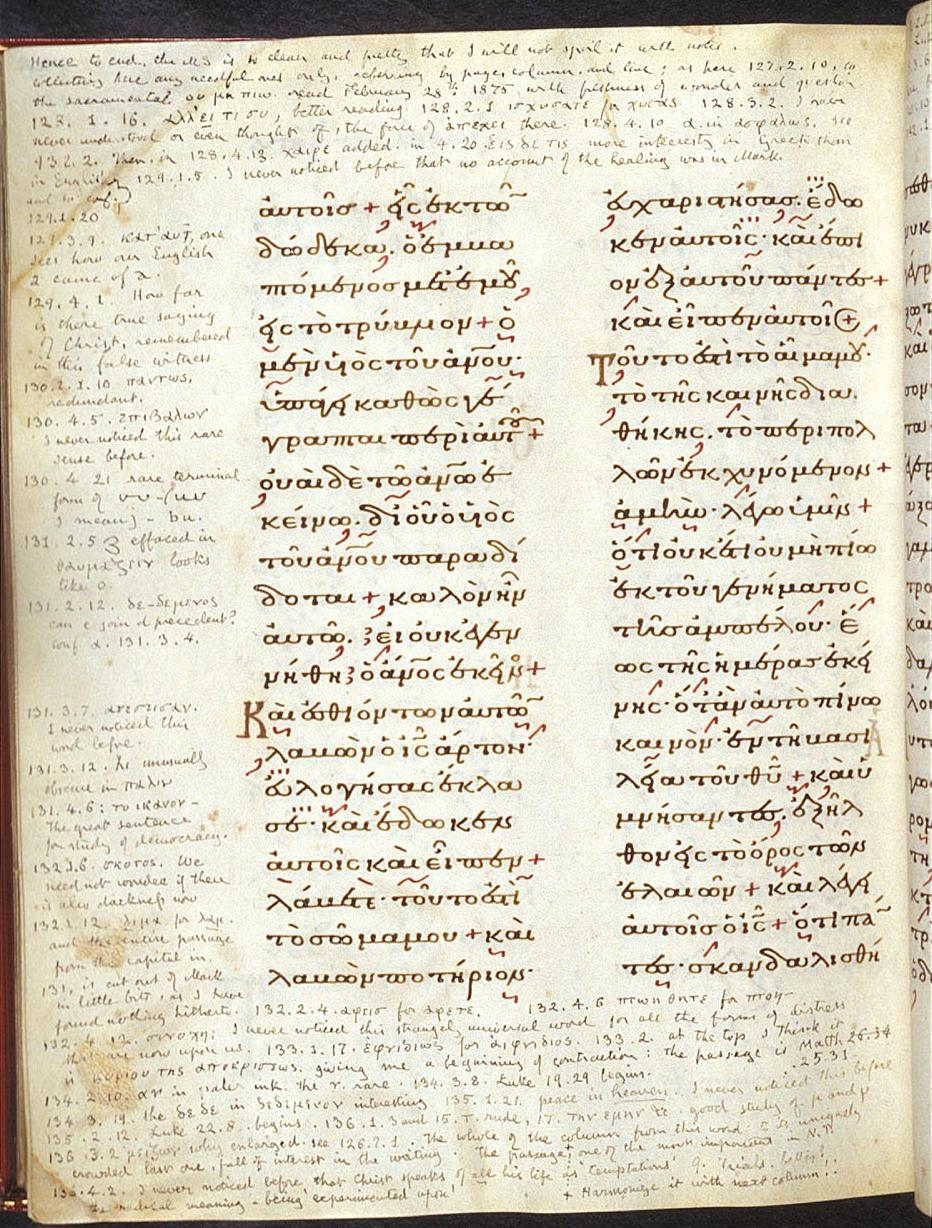
ℓ 238 folio 136 verso

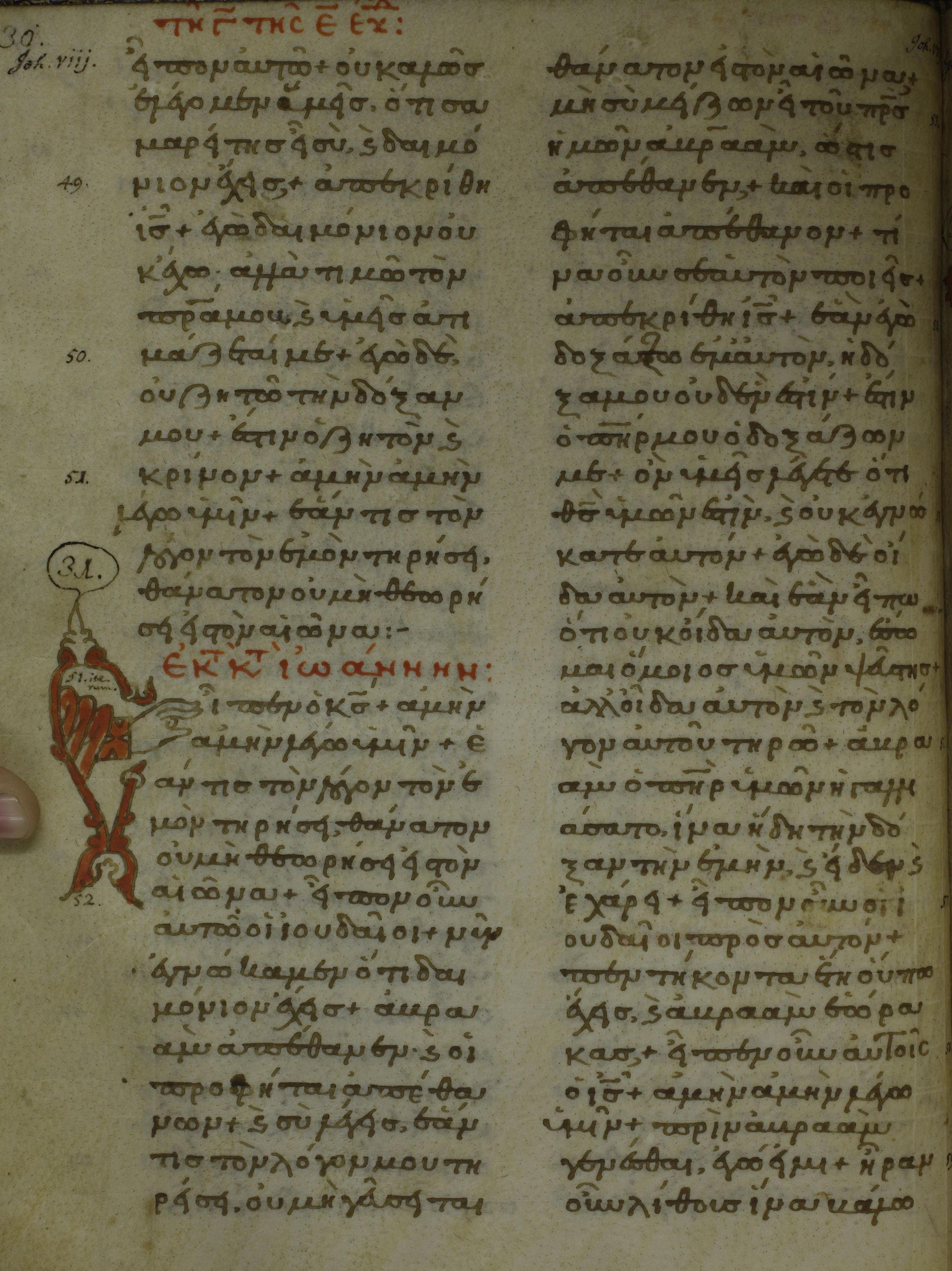
ℓ 239 folio 15 verso

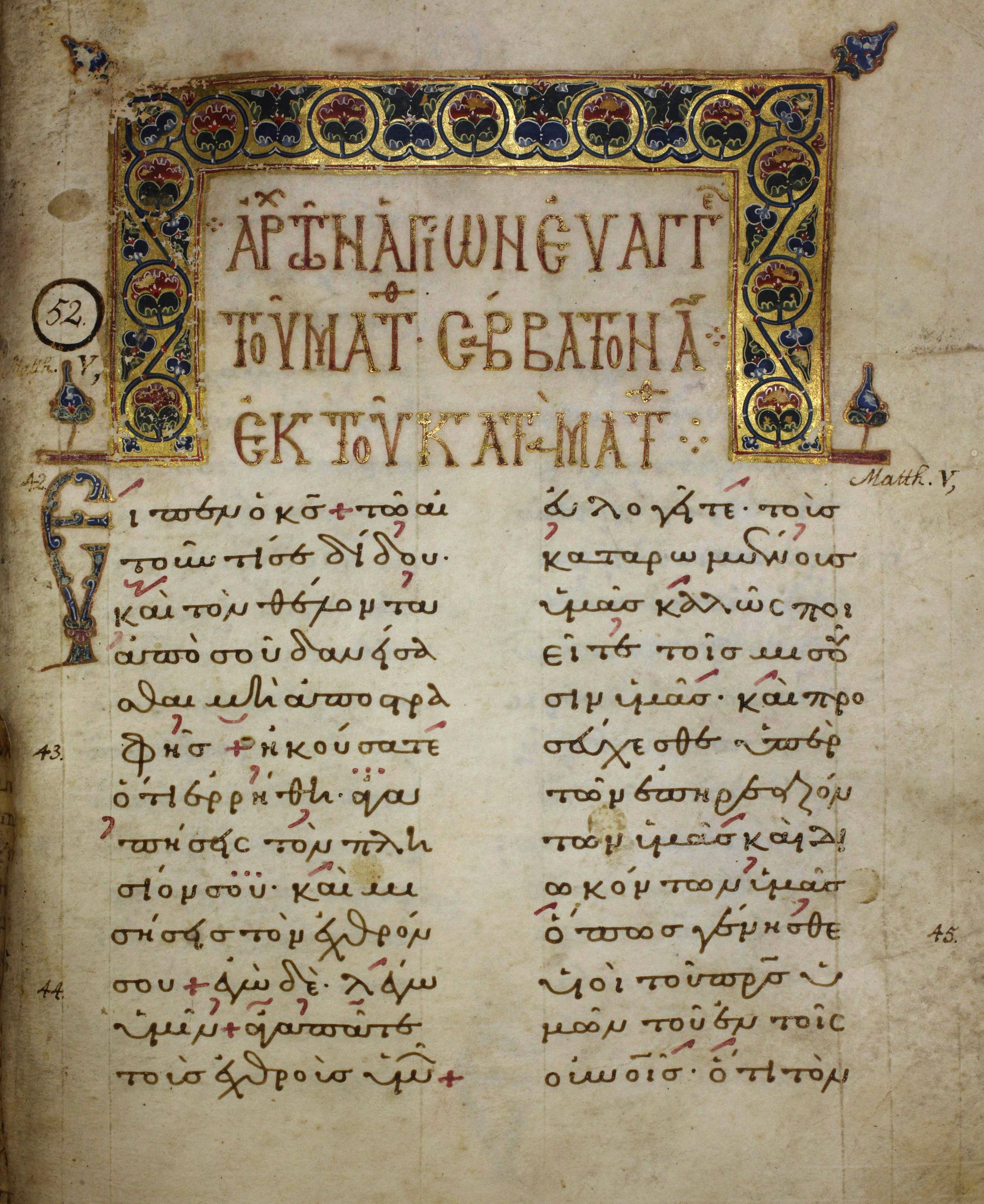
ℓ 240 folio 51 recto

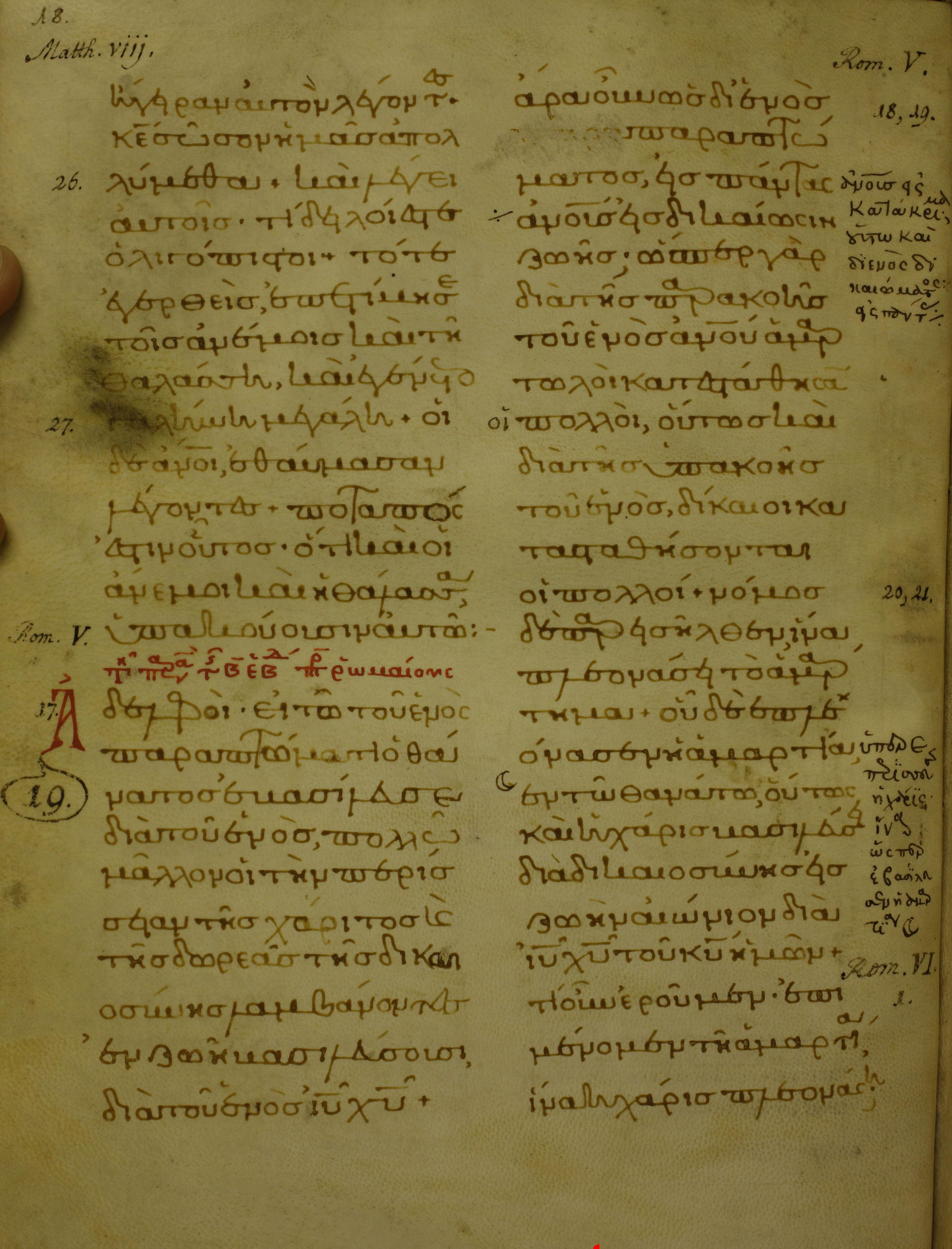
ℓ 241 folio 9 verso

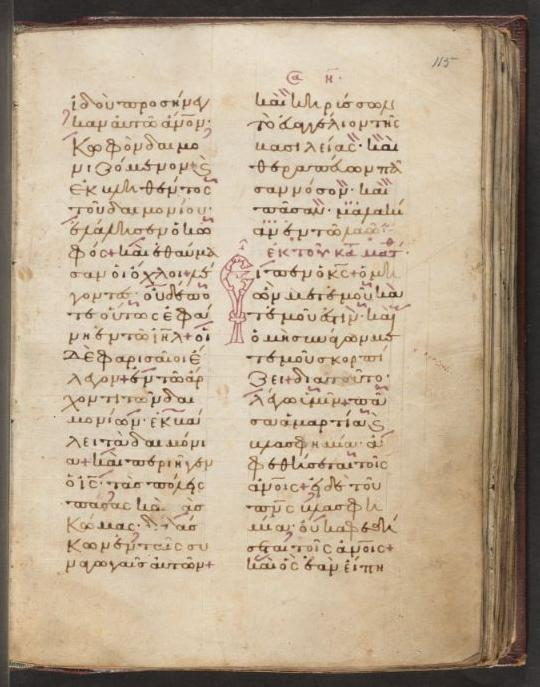
ℓ 297 folio 58 recto

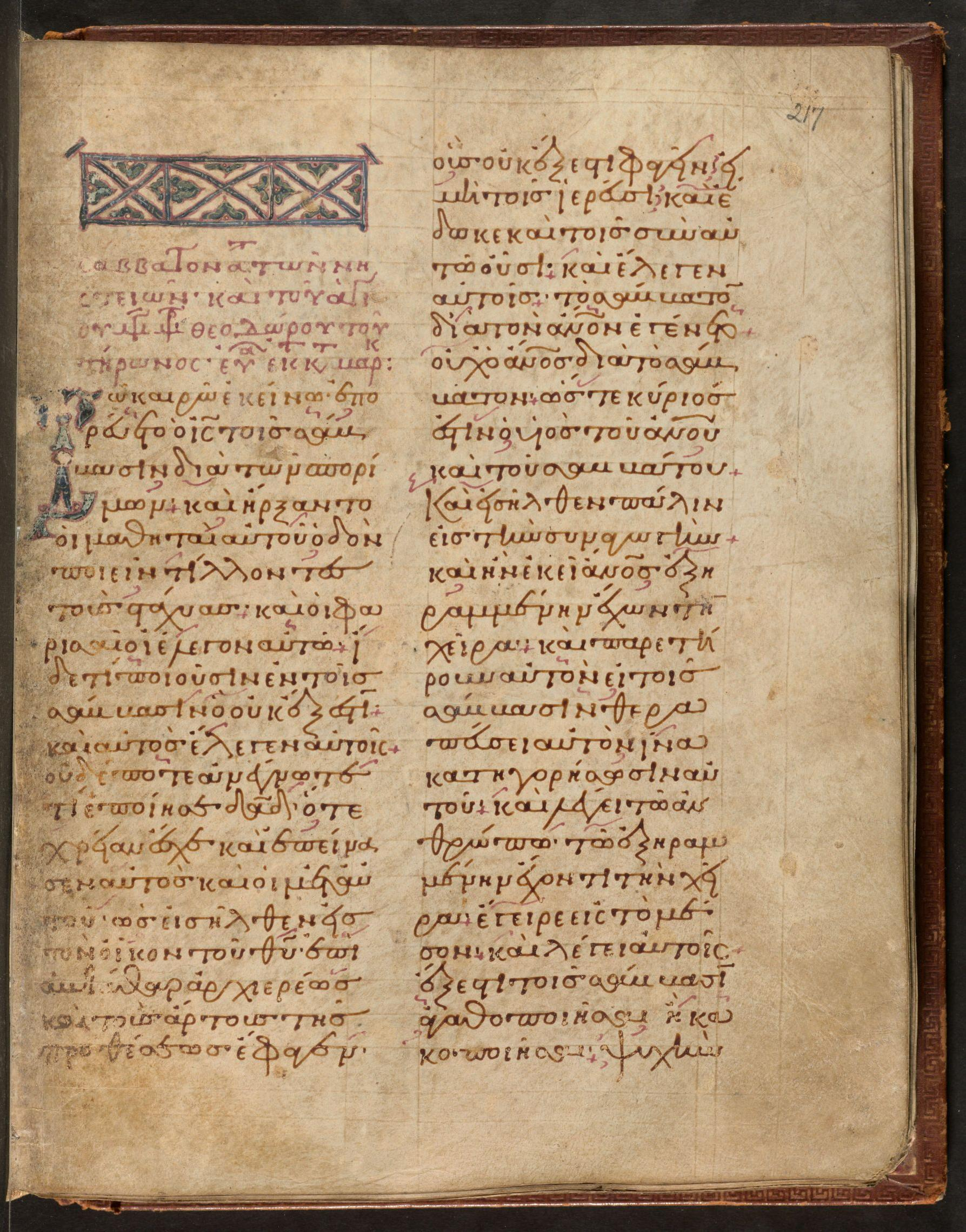
ℓ 298 folio 109 recto

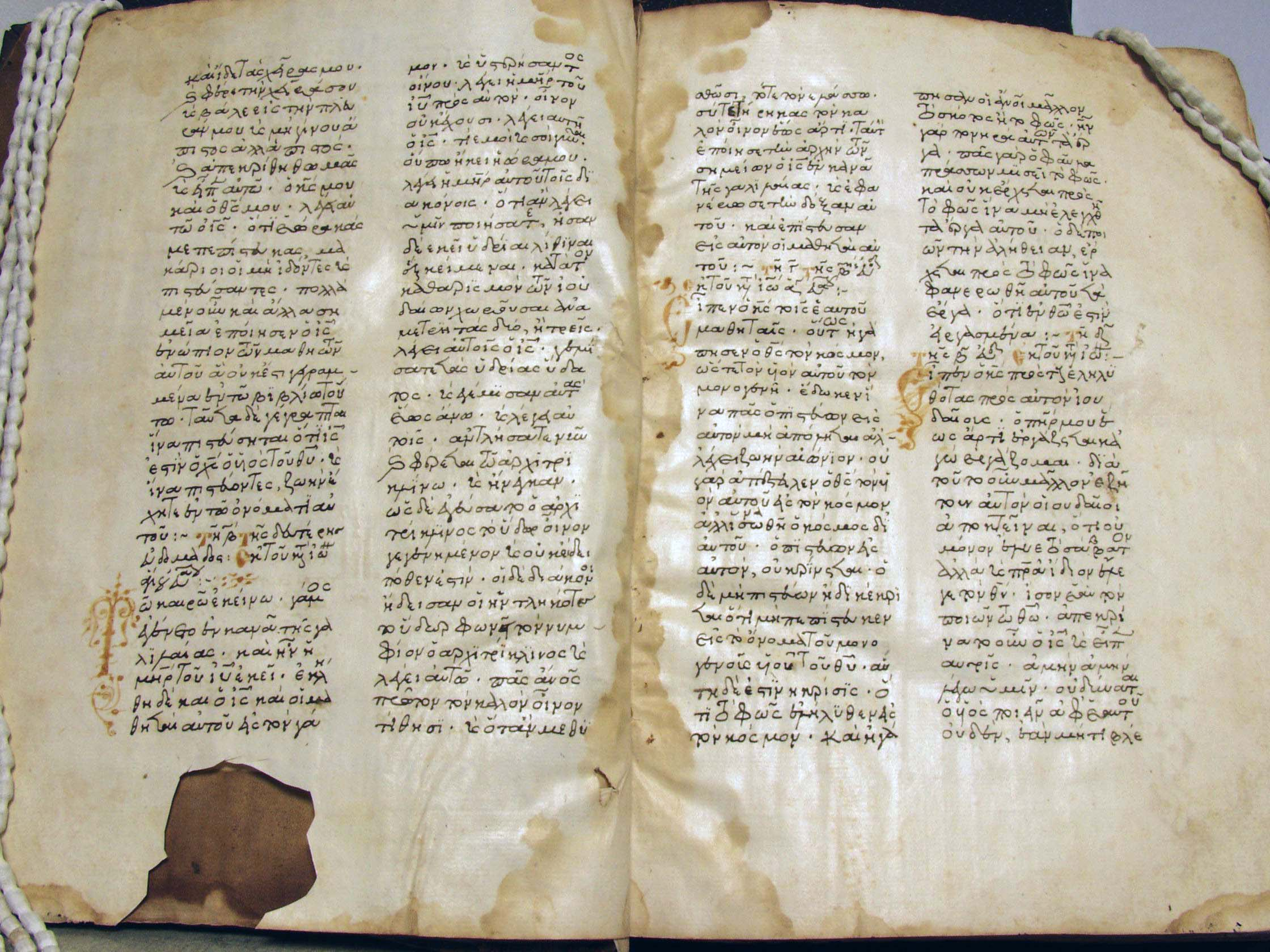
ℓ 1683

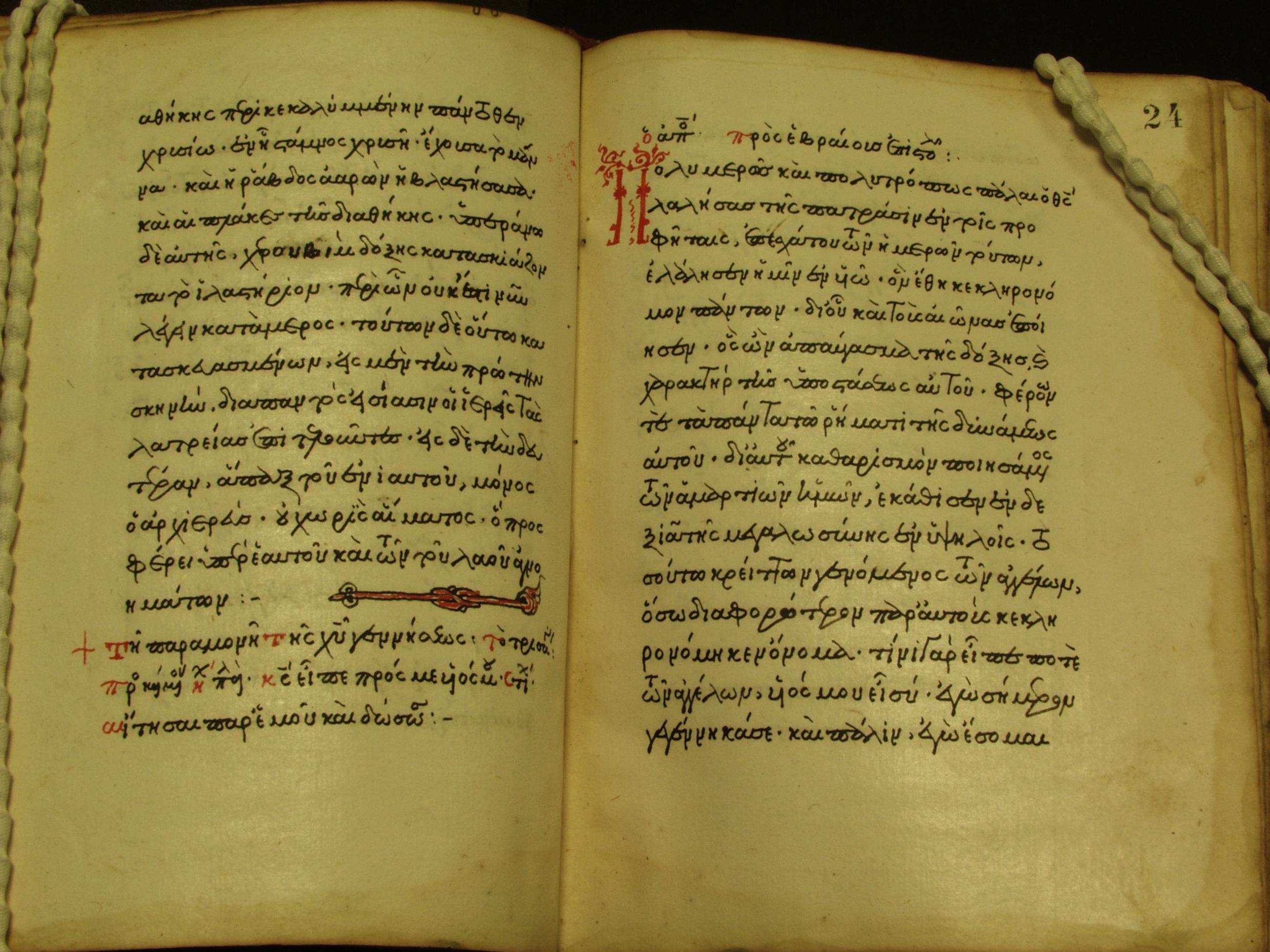
ℓ 1686

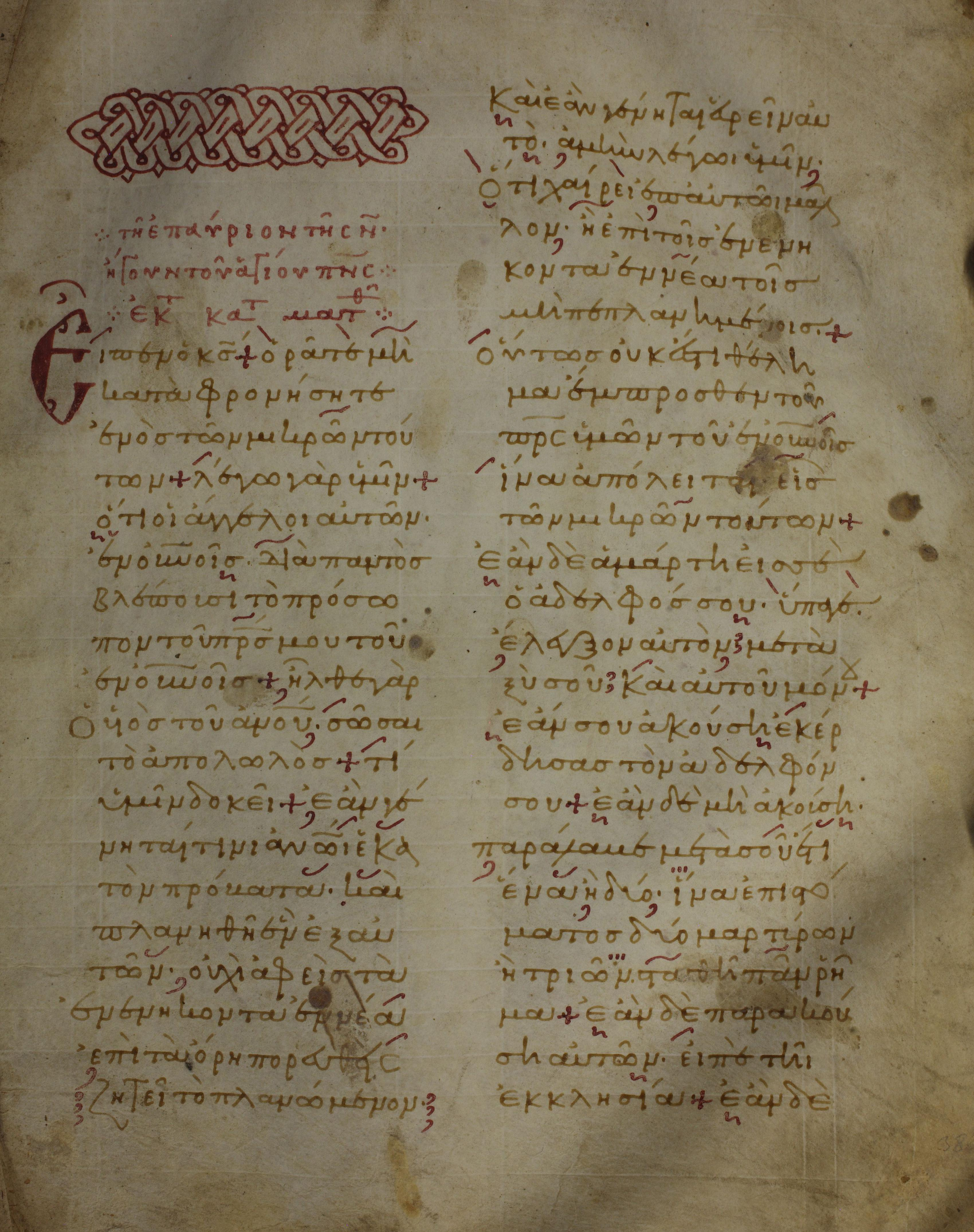
ℓ 2137 folio 38 recto

== See also ==
Lists

- Categories of New Testament manuscripts
- Lists of New Testament manuscripts
- List of New Testament papyri
- List of New Testament uncials
- List of New Testament minuscules
- List of New Testament Latin manuscripts
- List of New Testament amulets

Articles

- Novum Testamentum Graece
- Biblical manuscript
- Palaeography
- Textual criticism

== Bibliography ==
- Dr. Peter M. Head. The Early Greek Bible Manuscript Project: New Testament Lectionary Manuscripts.
- K. Aland, M. Welte, B. Köster, K. Junack, Kurzgefasste Liste der griechischen Handschriften des Neuen Testaments, Walter de Gruyter, Berlin, New York 1994, pp. 219 ff.
- Aland, Kurt; Barbara Aland (1995). The Text of the New Testament: An Introduction to the Critical Editions and to the Theory and Practice of Modern Textual Criticism. Translated by Erroll F. Rhodes (2nd ed.). Grand Rapids, Michigan: William B. Eerdmans Publishing Co. ISBN 0-8028-4098-1.
- Seid, Timothy. "A Table of Greek Manuscripts". Interpreting Ancient Manuscripts. Retrieved June 22, 2007.
- Black M., Aland K., Die alten Übersetzungen des Neuen Testaments, die Kirchenväterzitate und Lektionare: der gegenwärtige Stand ihrer Erforschung und ihre Bedeutung für die griechische Textgeschichte, Wissenschaftliche Beirat des Instituts für neutestamentliche Textforschung, Berlin 1972.
- Carroll D. Osburn, The Greek Lectionaries of the New Testament, in. The Text of the New Testament in Contemporary Research, ed. Bart D. Ehrman and Michael W. Holmes, William B. Eerdmans Publishing Company, Grand Rapids 1995, pp. 61–74.
