= 1565 in literature =

This article contains information about the literary events and publications of 1565.

== Events ==
- March 1 – Poet and missionary José de Anchieta co-founds Rio de Janeiro.
- October – Torquato Tasso enters the service of Cardinal Luigi d'Este at Ferrara.
- unknown dates
  - Philip Neri founds the Biblioteca Vallicelliana in Rome.
  - Approximate time of composition of the Bannatyne Manuscript.

== New books ==
=== Prose ===
- William Allen
  - A Defense and Declaration of the Catholike Churches Doctrine touching Purgatory, and Prayers of the Soules Departed
  - De Sacramentis
- Giovanni Battista Giraldi – Gli Hecatommithi
- Pierre Pithou – Adversariorum subsectorum lib. II
- Camillo Porzio – La Congiura dei baroni
- John Stow – Summarie of Englyshe Chronicles
- Bernardino Telesio – De natura juxta propria principia (On the Nature of Things according to their Own Principles)
- Joseph Karo – Shulchan Aruch (Code of Jewish Law)

=== Drama ===
- Jean-Antoine de Baïf – L'Eunuque

=== Picture ===
- Richard Breton – Les songes drolatiques de Pantagruel (The Drolatic Dreams of Pantagruel)

=== Poetry ===
- See 1565 in poetry

== Births ==
- September 28 – Alessandro Tassoni, Italian poet (died 1635)
- Unknown dates
  - Gonzalo de Illescas, Spanish historian (died 1633)
  - Francis Meres, English author and cleric (died 1647)
  - Anthony Shirley, English traveler and writer (died 1635)

== Deaths ==
- March 17 – Alexander Ales, Scottish theologian (born 1500)
- March – Lope de Rueda, Spanish dramatist (born c. 1510)
- May 14 – Nicolaus von Amsdorf, German theologian (born 1483)
- August 27 – William Rastell, English printer (born 1508)
- October 7 – Johannes Mathesius, German theologian (born 1504)
- October 22 – Jean Grolier de Servières, French bibliophile (born 1479)
- December 13 – Conrad Gessner, Swiss naturalist and bibliographer (born 1516)
- Unknown dates
  - Paolo Pino, Italian painter and writer on art (born 1534)
  - Benedetto Varchi, Italian poet and historian (born c. 1502)
