= Lectionary 137 =

Lectionary ℓ 137
- New Testament manuscript
- Text: Evangelistarion
- Date: 11th century
- Script: Greek
- Now at: Biblioteca Vallicelliana
- Size: 23.7 cm by 18.4 cm

Lectionary 137, designated by siglum ℓ 137 (in the Gregory-Aland numbering) is a Greek manuscript of the New Testament, on parchment leaves. Palaeographically it has been assigned to the 11th century.

== Description ==
The codex contains lessons from the Gospels of John, Matthew, Luke lectionary (Evangelistarium), on 105 parchment leaves (23.7 cm by 18.4 cm), with one lacuna at the beginning. The text is written in Greek minuscule letters, in two columns per page, 20 lines per page.

== History ==
The manuscript once belonged to Pietro Polidori, who presented it to the Biblioteca Vallicelliana. It was added to the list of New Testament manuscripts by Scholz. Scholz was the first who examined and described codex. The codex was slightly examined by Gregory.

The manuscript is not cited in the critical editions of the Greek New Testament (UBS3).

Currently the codex is located in the Biblioteca Vallicelliana (D. 63) in Rome.

== See also ==
- List of New Testament lectionaries
- Biblical manuscript
- Textual criticism

== Bibliography ==
- J. M. A. Scholz, Biblisch-kritische Reise in Frankreich, der Schweiz, Italien, Palästine und im Archipel in den Jahren 1818, 1819, 1820, 1821: Nebst einer Geschichte des Textes des Neuen Testaments.
