= Lectionary 161 =

Lectionary ℓ 161
- New Testament manuscript
- Text: Apostolarion
- Date: 16th century
- Script: Greek
- Now at: Biblioteca Vallicelliana
- Size: 21.5 by 16 cm

Lectionary 161, designated by siglum ℓ 161 (in the Gregory-Aland numbering) is a Greek manuscript of the New Testament, on paper leaves. Paleographically it has been assigned to the 16th century. Formerly it was labelled as Lectionary 39^{a}.

== Description ==
The codex contains weekday Apostolos lessons (Acts and Epistles) from Easter to Pentecost and Saturday/Sunday Gospel lessons for the other weeks lectionary (Apostolarion), on 115 paper leaves (21.5 cm by 16 cm). It is written in Greek minuscule letters, in one column per page, 24 lines per page.

== History ==
The manuscript is not cited in the critical editions of the Greek New Testament (UBS3).

Currently the codex is located in the Biblioteca Vallicelliana (C. 46, fol. 227–341) at Rome.

== See also ==
- List of New Testament lectionaries
- Biblical manuscript
- Textual criticism
