= Nicolas Elphinstone =

Scottish courtier and diplomatic messenger (died 1579)

Nicolas or Nicoll Elphinstone (died 1579) was a Scottish courtier and diplomatic messenger. He was the son of Lawrence Elphinstone of Selmys, 1435–1515. He worked for James Stewart, Regent Moray and was involved in attempts to sell the jewels and pearls of Mary, Queen of Scots in 1567 and 1568. Moray needed to raise money to govern Scotland and subdue Mary's supporters by force.

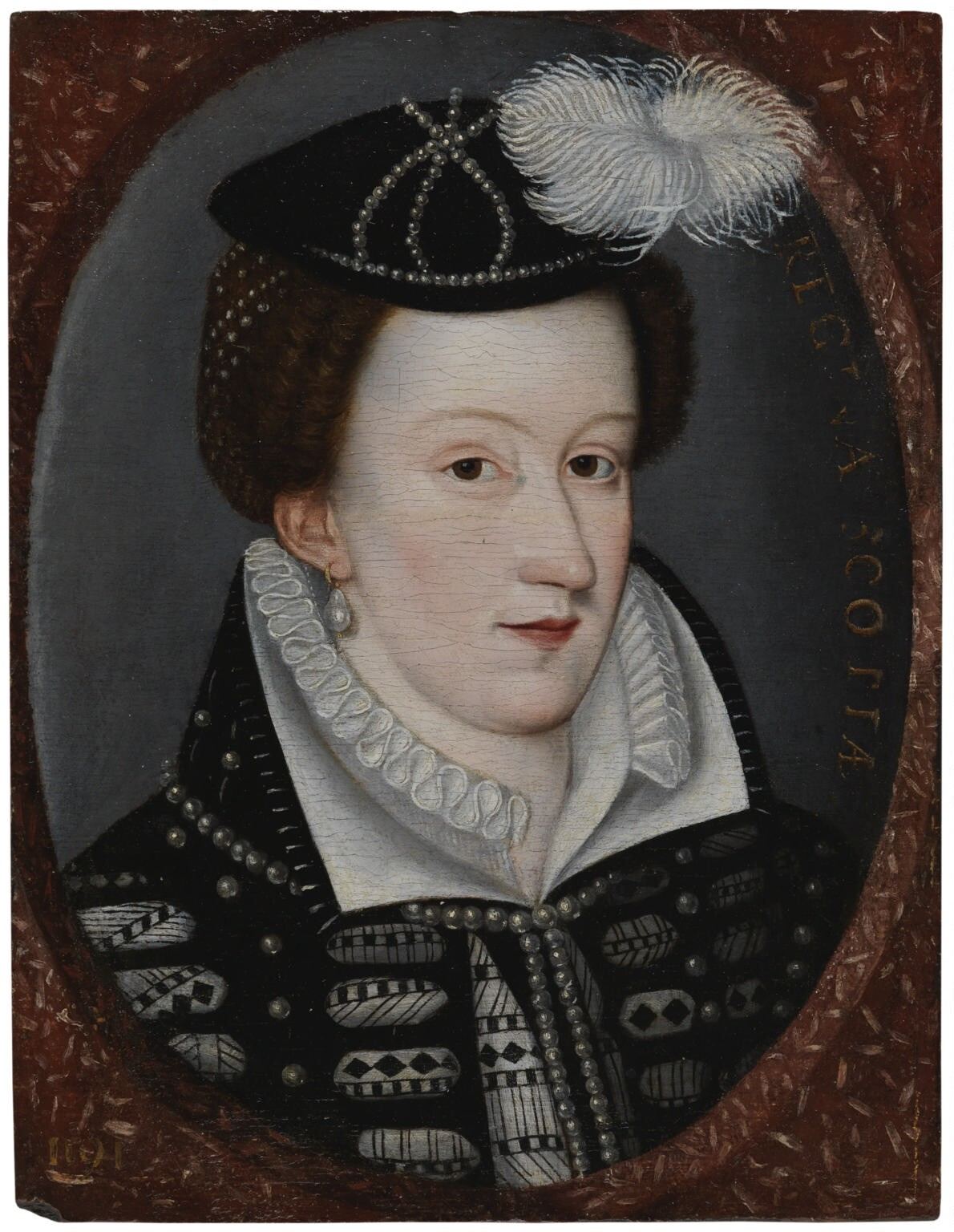
Mary Queen of Scots, with ropes of pearl, and pearls embroidered on her bonnet

== Elphinstone and the Place of Schank ==
Nicolas or Nicholl Elphinstone, described as a servant of Mary of Guise, sought a passport to travel to France in September 1554. On 1 August 1566 he obtained the lands of Schank from James Sandilands, Preceptor of Torphichen. The Place of Schank was north of the Arniston estate in Midlothian, and an image representing the house was drawn on a 16th-century estate map. The walled garden of a later house on the site of Schank can be seen at Gore Glen Woodland Park, on the higher ground between the South Esk and the Gore Water. The wooded area between these rivers is known as the "Shank Tongue" or "Shank Point".

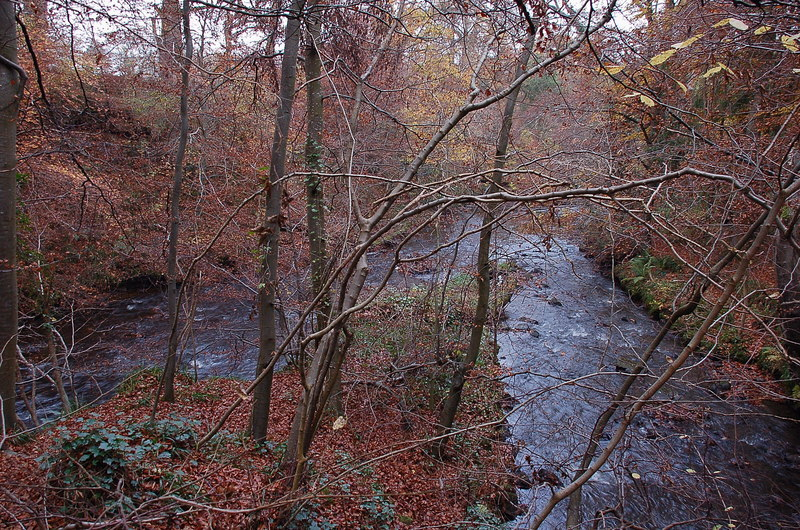
Confluence of the Gore and South Esk, on the former Elphinstone Schank property

== Elphinstone in London ==
Nicoll Elphinstone, trained in law, was an important servant of James Stewart, Earl of Moray, a half-brother of Mary, Queen of Scots. Moray sent him to Queen Elizabeth's court in the summer of 1565. John Knox said that he went to England in July 1565 to raise £10,000 for Mary's political opponents, at the time of her marriage to Lord Darnley, finance for the rebellion known as the Chaseabout Raid.

On 2 August 1565 Moray wrote to the Earl of Bedford, Governor of Berwick, that he had sent a boat armed with cannon to Lindisfarne to pick up Elphinstone. He hoped Bedford could ensure Elphinstone's safe passage on land from Newcastle. The ship, owned by Charles Wilson, was also intended to carry Moray's pregnant wife, Agnes Keith, to the English court in September.

Mary Queen of Scots was imprisoned in Lochleven Castle by the Confederate Lords after the battle of Carberry Hill. The Earl of Moray was in London. He sent Nicholas Elphinstone to her in July 1567, but the Lords would not allow him to see the queen. The Confederate Lords considered sending Elphinstone to France to declare their actions to Charles IX. Moray arrived in Scotland and was made Regent of Scotland on 22 August 1567. He now had control of royal property including a chest of jewels in Edinburgh Castle.

On 20 October 1567 Moray sent Elphinstone to Berwick-upon-Tweed and London with a consignment of the queen's jewels. These pieces were intended for sale and not to be pledged for loans. They were given an estimated value of 9,000 French crowns. The consignment included:

- A chain of 91 little rings with two sparks of rubies (except two missing), with 12 square "intermiddis" (entredeux) set with table diamonds, and one round entredeux with a ruby, and two rock rubies. Estimate 3,000 French crowns.
- Four great table rubies in a gold garnishing (head-dress). Estimate 3,000 French crowns.
- Four great table diamonds set in the same fashion. Estimate 3,000 French crowns.

Elphinstone went to London in January 1568. At first Elizabeth would not see him because Moray had declined an audience for one of her diplomats. The details of Elphinstone's negotiations with Elizabeth I in January 1568 are unclear, but he may have tried to discuss the recognition of James VI and his place in the English succession.

=== Pearls and Queen Elizabeth ===
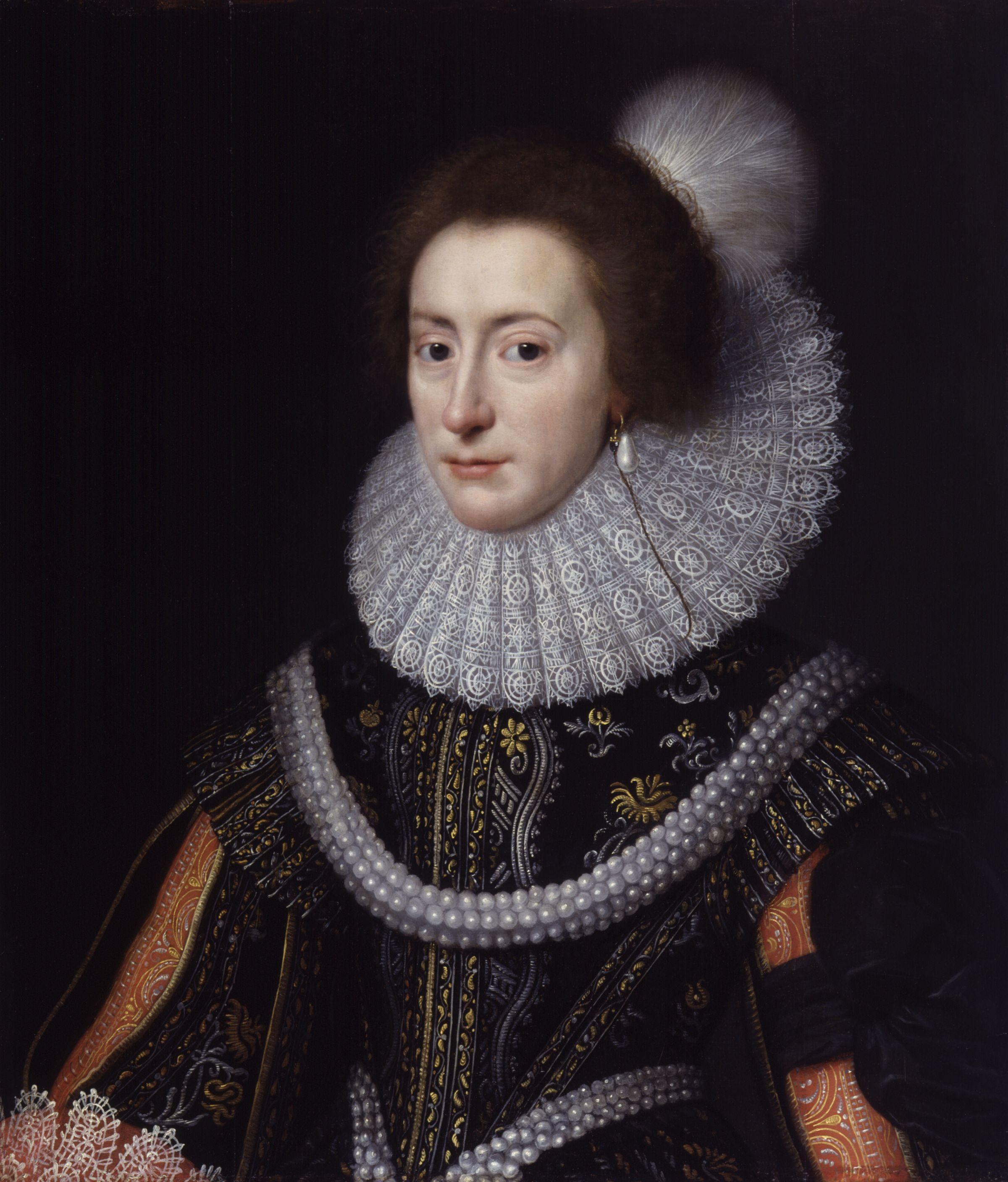
Elizabeth of Bohemia, wearing the "Medici pearls"

Elphinstone sold a large group of pearls to Elizabeth at the end of April 1568. These pearls have come to be known as the "Medici pearls". Pope Clement VII is said to given them to Catherine de' Medici as a wedding gift. Brantôme wrote that she gave them to Mary and he saw her wearing them. Catherine made efforts to buy them back in London. The pearls are said to have been given in 1613 to Princess Elizabeth at her marriage, and some are thought to have returned to the British royal family. King James bought pearls and gave them to Princess Elizabeth pearls before her marriage. Anne of Denmark, in 1619, had a "carcanet" of long and round pearls worth £40,000 and said to be the "fairest that are to be found in Christendom."

The attempted sales in London in 1568 are known from the letters of a French diplomat, Jacques Bochetel de la Forest. Bochetel described the great pearls in detail. There were six cordons sashes strung like paternosters, each with twenty five pearls, many large and beautiful, the most part as big as muscady nuts or nutmegs. The word for nutmeg has been misunderstood to mean "black pearls". There were no black pearls. They were valued by several merchants for Elizabeth. English merchants offered 10,000 crowns, Italians 12,000, a merchant from Geneva suggested 16,000. Elizabeth, it was thought, paid 12,000. The rest of the jewels on offer were not so valuable, except a well mounted piece of unicorn horn. There were no black pearls.

Bochetel de Forrest described how Elpinstone had met the Scottish double-agent Ninian Cockburn, alias "Beaumont", on his journey at Berwick. Nicholas Throckmorton arranged his audience with Elizabeth, and Elphinstone showed her the jewels and pearls in the presence of the Earls of Pembroke and Leicester. Bochetel wrote that the jewels were carried secretly to London and the pearls sold to Elizabeth for twelve thousand crowns: "ces bagues ... ont este icy envoyees fort secretement, et en fin, comme jay cy devant escript, acheptees par ceste royne pour le somme de douze mil escus." The concluded sale was not kept secret: when Elphinstone came to Carlisle in June 1568, Mary asked for his arrest as "hyr grevous enemye and seller of hyr juells", and he was threatened by James Cockburn of Skirling. William Kirkcaldy of Grange noted the sale in his memorandum on the Edinburgh Castle jewel coffer: "Item Mr Nycoll Elphingston sauld the pearll in London for xiij m or xiiij m quhilk the Queen of England hes for hir self & causit by them."

Regent Moray wrote to Earl of Leicester on 3 May 1568 that Elphinstone would tell him about Mary's escape from Lochleven Castle. The jewel sales were halted by Mary's escape from Lochleven and arrival in England on 16 May 1568. Elizabeth now had to appear impartial to causes in Scotland. She bought no more jewels directly from Moray's agents and made efforts to prevent other sales of Mary's goods in England. The "Great H of Scotland" was returned unsold. Elphinstone sent a letter to William Cecil when he got back to Edinburgh on 21 May 1568, carried by a man who had been at the battle of Langside and would describe the battle to Cecil.

=== Messenger for Regent Moray ===
Elphinstone continued to take messages to Elizabeth and Cecil for Regent Moray. In June 1568 he took Moray's message to Lord Scrope at Carlisle. Moray gave him a length of black velvet for his clothes and 120 French gold crowns to go London in January 1570. His instructions were to discuss offers to William Drury, the Marshal of Berwick, for him to lead an army in Scotland against Mary's supporters, issues following the Rising of the North, and Moray's actions against his rebels. Elphinstone was to press for at least £1,000 and £1,000 yearly to protect Protestant Scotland. John Tamworth, Keeper of Elizabeth's Privy Purse, had loaned Moray £5,000. Later, there was some uncertainty about any commitment to pay any regular sum of money to Moray. Elizabeth sent Thomas Randolph to Scotland in reply to Moray's requests, but Moray had been assassinated.

Mary heard news that Elphinstone had arrive in London. She believed that he was working to have her sent to Scotland as a captive, writing on 24 January 1570 from Tutbury Castle, "we remain still in great pain to understand what way of practise Elphinstone can make at court for our delivering in Murray's hands". Regent Moray had already been shot in Linlithgow by James Hamilton of Bothwellhaugh. Elphinstone was in London when news of the assassination broke. He assumed the story was untrue, a rumour spread by Mary's secretary the Bishop of Ross, and wrote to Cecil with this theory. Unsold jewels were left with Regent Moray's widow, Agnes Keith.

Later in the year, Elphinstone was given instructions with 34 articles to negotiate with the Earl of Sussex by Regent Lennox. He rode to Alnwick with the Earl's servant Richard Wroth on 26 October 1570. The mission was intended to convince Sussex that the Queen's party had broken the truce known as the "abstinence". Sussex wished the abstinence to continue.

== Regent Mar ==
He delivered letters to Elizabeth from Regent Mar in June 1572, while she was busy with Montmorency and other French ambassadors. Thomas Randolph wrote to Mar that Elphinstone was returning with disappointing news.

Elphinstone was involved in a second plan for Mary's rendition to Scotland and trial, liaising between the English diplomat Henry Killigrew and Regent and the Earl of Morton. Killigrew mentioned that Elphinstone was a "wise and trusty instrument, who hathe the dealing in it heretofore". The scheme was abandoned when Regent Mar died in October 1572.

== Regent Morton ==
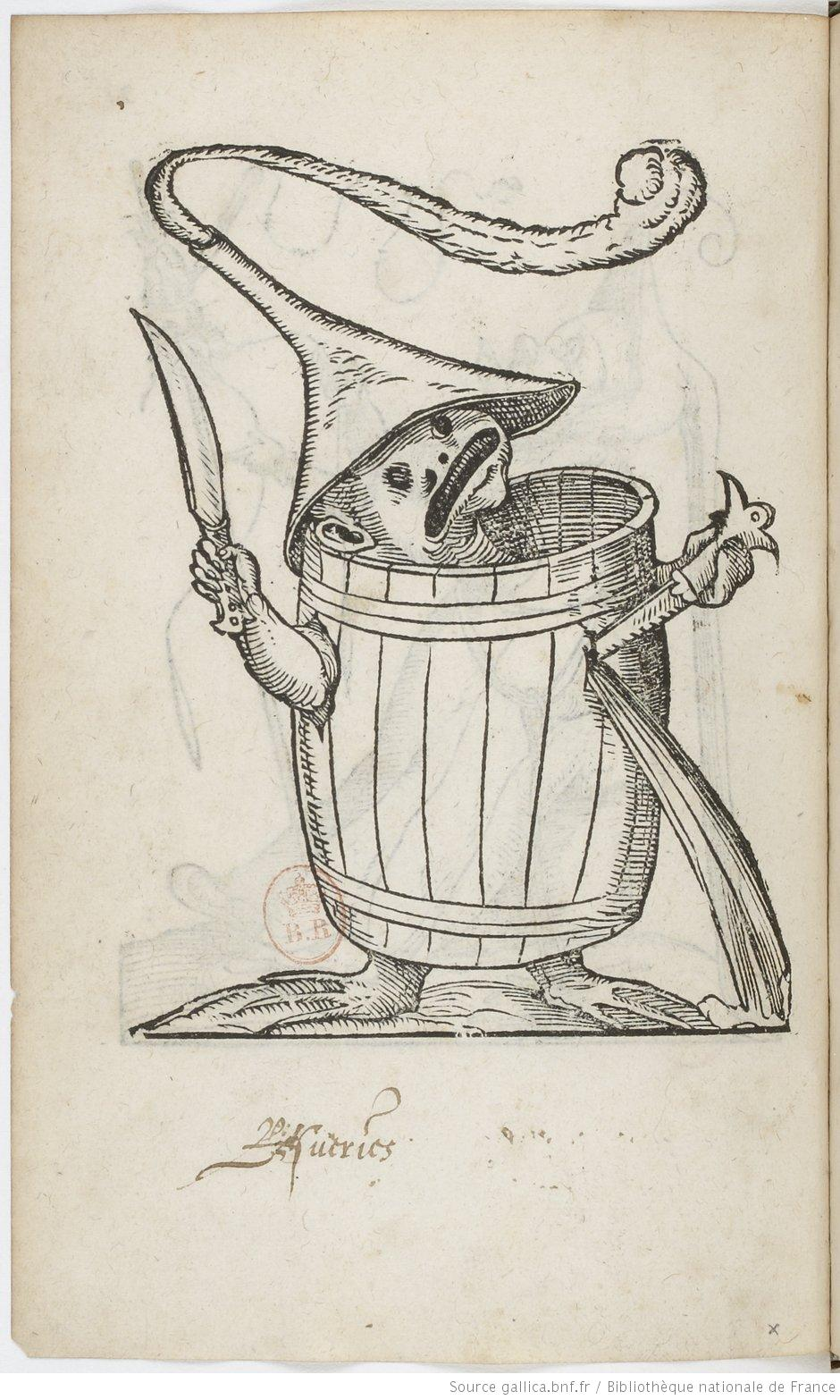
Nicholas Elphinstone gave the young James VI a copy of a French comic book, Les songes drolatiques de Pantagruel, Paris, 1565

Elphinstone received £50 yearly from the English exchequer as a pension for supporters of English policy in Scotland. He was described as a good servant to the late Regent Moray, wise and well affected (to England), and in great favour with Regent Morton.

In January 1573 he wrote to the English diplomat Henry Killigrew describing events in the siege of Edinburgh Castle, noting the defenders of the castle were using St Margaret's well near St Cuthbert's kirk. He asking for money for the Regent's troops. Killigrew sent his letter on to William Cecil.

By September 1576, Elphinstone had acquired the property of Schank in East Lothian. Morton arranged a royal gift for him of a pension of £200 from the tithes or teinds known as "thirds of benefices" earmarked for the support of the king's household. The letter of gift narrates Elphinstone's service for James VI "since his nativity" especially in matters of "credit and importance" outside the realm of Scotland. Elphinstone complained that he had not received payments allocated from the estates of Newbattle Abbey in 1577. During the crisis following the border incident known as the Raid of the Redeswire in 1577, Morton considered sending Elphinstone as an envoy to Queen Elizabeth, until her ambassador Henry Killigrew arrived in Edinburgh.

Elphinstone brought a copy of the illustrated costume book, Richard Breton and François Desprez, Recueil de la diversité des habits (Paris, 1562), and Les songes drolatiques de Pantagruel (Paris 1565), for the young king's library. Elphinstone told Regent Morton in 1577 that the keepers of the young king at Stirling Castle were not loyal to him, and according to James Melville of Halhill, he advised Morton to bribe them and buy their service. He acted as Morton's spy in the royal household.

He had died before February 1579, when his executors were paid £1,461 Scots from the profit of the royal mint.

== Shank Place and its prisoners ==
The lands and barony of Shank were inherited by his son John Elphinstone and held in fee by his widow Elizabeth Edmonstoun (who married James Hoppringle of Torsons). The Elphinstones exchanged some lands with George Dundas of Arniston and his son James Dundas, and a subsequent boundary dispute led in 1582 to the making of one of the earliest estate plans in Scotland, which includes a picture of "Schanck Place".

The plan shows a rectangular walled garden to the north of the house or manor (as it was called in some legal records) and an approach road running south towards Arniston Mains. Shank Place was drawn as a tower house roofed at four levels with a single storey range or courtyard wall running west to a narrow turret with a conical roof, a feature resembling the Glassin tower at Lochleven Castle, where Mary, Queen of Scots had been imprisoned. This building was demolished and replaced by another house. Survey work by the Royal Commission on the Ancient and Historical Monuments of Scotland to confirm the layout of the 1580s Elphinstone garden was inconclusive.

In 1617, William Franshe or French of Fransheland complained to the Privy Council that two heiresses, daughters of a kinsman, had been kept prisoner at Schank for six years, "sequestrate from all society and company". Their brother, Adam French of Thornidykes, had died in 1617 after he was abducted from school in Haddington and forcibly married to Jean Chernside in 1613. William French feared that Jean and Alison French might now marry against his will. John Elphinstone of Schank was ordered to deliver the girls to the care of the Privy Council. Eventually, Jean French married John Cranston, a brother of William Cranstoun, 1st Lord Cranstoun, and Alison married another member of the Cranstoun family, Thomas Cranstoun of Huntliewood. The third sister, Margaret French, who had been kept in similar circumstances by William Home of Hardiesmylne, married Robert Brownfield of Todrig.

The title of baron of Shank eventually passed to George Mackenzie of Rosehaugh, and his descendants sold it to Robert Dundas in 1753.
