= Philippe Danfrie =

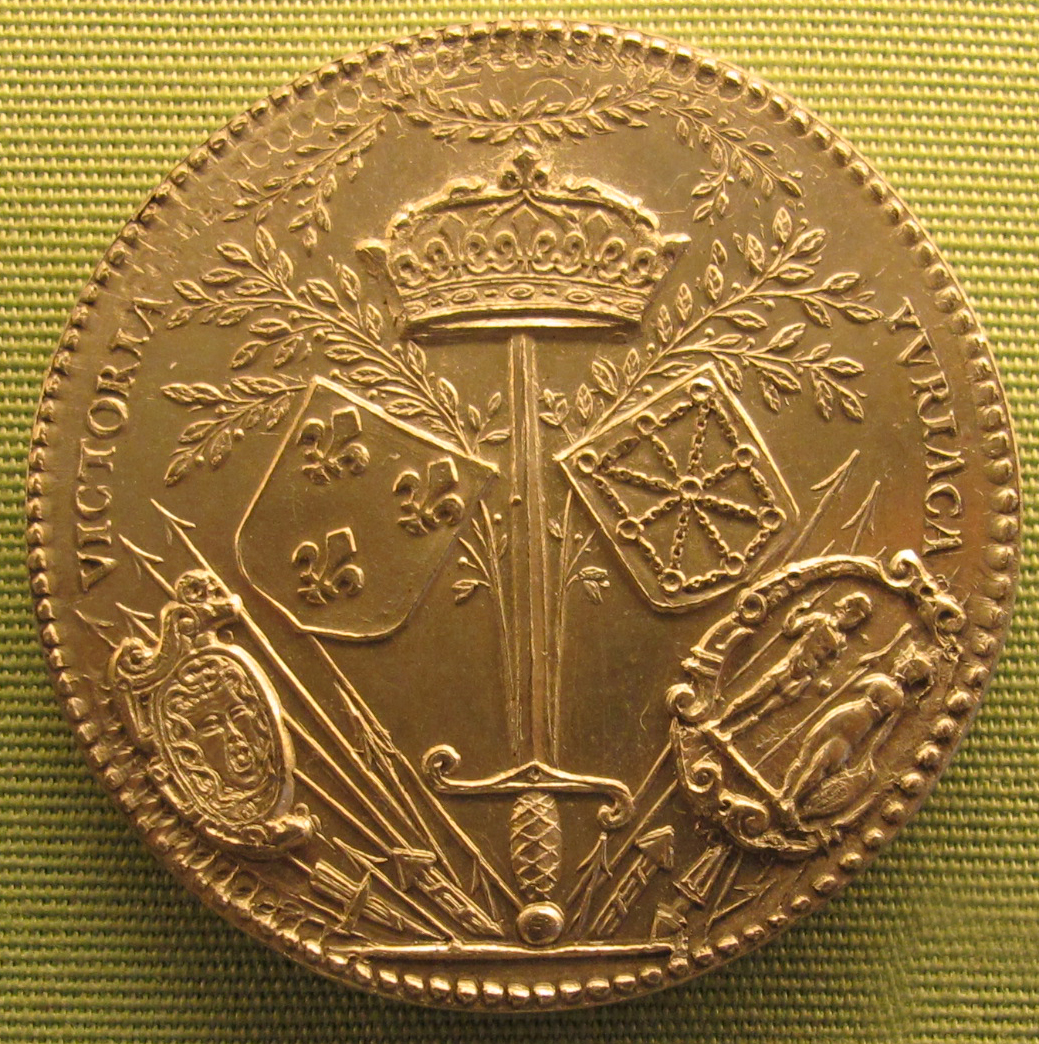
A medal by Danfrie (1590)

Philippe Danfrie the elder (about 1532 – 1606) was a designer and maker of mathematical instruments in metal and paper, as well as a punchcutter, engraver, minter of coins and medals, publisher and author. Much is known about Danfrie's life and activities. He is probably best known as designer of the surveying instrument known as the graphometer.

Danfrie was born in Cornouaille in Brittany. Danfrie went to Paris in the 1550s and set up as an engraver of letter punches. He produced a number of books in partnership with Richard Breton in 1558–60 and later with Pierre Haman and Jean Le Royer. He also made mathematical instruments, globes and astrolabes and dies for marking bookbindings. In 1571 he cut his first dies for jetons. As Engraver-General of the French coinage from 1582, he provided the puncheons from which the dies used in every mint in France were taken. He also produced a number of medals (e.g. London, British Museum) commemorating the events of the first fifteen years of Henry IV's reign.

Engraver and superintendent of the Paris Mint, Philippe Danfrie was also an engineer and inventor of scientific instruments. Active in the second half of the sixteenth century, he built globes, astrolabes, and clocks. He invented a typeface that he used in his published writings. These include: Declaration de l'usage du Graphometre..., printed in Paris in 1597 together with Traicte de l'usage du Trigometre, avec le quel on peut facilement mesurer sans subiection d'Arithmetique. Danfrie died in Paris.

His son Philippe Danfrie the younger (b. ?Paris, c. 1572; d. Paris, 1604) was appointed Controller-General of effigies in 1591. On his appointment it was claimed that he had demonstrated great skill in modelling portraits in wax and engraving puncheons. His most famous and only signed medal (e.g. London, BM) is cast rather than struck and celebrates the victory of Henry IV of France over the Duke of Savoy in 1600.
