= Minuscule 171 =

- New Testament manuscript
- Text: Gospels
- Date: 14th century
- Script: Greek
- Now at: Biblioteca Vallicelliana
- Size: 14.4 cm by 10.9 cm
- Type: Byzantine text-type
- Category: V
- Note: marginalia

Minuscule 171 is a Greek minuscule manuscript of the New Testament Gospels, written on parchment. It is designated by the siglum 171 in the Gregory-Aland numbering of New Testament manuscripts, and ε 407 in the von Soden numbering of New Testament manuscripts. Using the study of comparative writing styles (palaeography), it has been dated to the 14th century. The manuscript has complex contents and full marginal notes.

== Description ==
The manuscript is a codex (precursor to the modern book format), containing the complete text of the New Testament Gospels, made of 254 parchment leaves (sized 14.4 cm by 10.9 cm). The text is written in one column per page, with 20 lines per page. The column size is 8.5 cm by 6.5 cm, with the main text written in black ink, and the initial capital letters in red ink. It is ornamented with silver.

The text is divided according to the chapters (known as κεφαλαια / kephalaia), whose numbers are given in the margin, and their titles (known as τιτλοι / titloi) written at the top of the pages. There is also a division according to the smaller Ammonian Sections (236 in Mark 234, the last in 16:12), with references to the Eusebian Canons written below the Ammonian section numbers (both early divisions of the Gospels into sections.).

It contains prolegomena, tables of contents before each Gospel (also known as κεφαλαια), lectionary markings in the margin, lessons (known as αναγνωσεις / anagnoseis), and subscriptions at the end of each Gospel.

== Text ==
The Greek text of the codex is considered to be a representative of the Byzantine text-type. Biblical scholar Kurt Aland placed it in Category V of his New Testament manuscript classification system. Category V manuscripts are described as "manuscripts with a purely or predominantly Byzantine text."

According to the Claremont Profile Method (a specific analysis of textual data), it represents cluster Π171 in Luke 1, Luke 10, and Luke 20.

== History ==
The earliest history of the manuscript is unknown. It was once in the property of Achilles Statius, as also was minuscule 169. It was examined by biblical scholar Giuseppe Bianchini, and textual critic Andrew Birch (about 1782), and biblical scholar Johann M. A. Scholz. Biblical scholar Caspar René Gregory saw it in 1886.

It is currently dated by the INTF to the 14th century. It is presently housed at the Biblioteca Vallicelliana (shelf number C. 73.2), in Rome.

== See also ==
- List of New Testament minuscules
- Biblical manuscript
- Textual criticism

== External link ==
- Digital images of Minuscule 171 online at the Internet Culturale.
