= Minuscule 393 =

- New Testament manuscript
- Text: New Testament (except Rev.)
- Date: 14th century
- Script: Greek
- Now at: Biblioteca Vallicelliana
- Size: 26.7 cm by 17.3 cm
- Type: Byzantine text-type
- Category: V
- Note: marginalia

Minuscule 393 (in the Gregory-Aland numbering), δ 452 (Soden), is a Greek minuscule manuscript of the New Testament, on paper. Palaeographically it has been assigned to the 14th century. It has marginalia.

== Description ==
The codex contains the text of the New Testament except Book of Revelation on 222 paper leaves (26.7 cm by 17.3 cm). The text is written in one column per page, in 34 lines per page.

The text is divided according to the κεφαλαια (chapters), whose numbers are given at the margin, and the τιτλοι (titles) at the top of the pages. It contains lectionary markings at the margin (for liturgical use), they were added by later hand.

The order of books is unusual: Acts, Catholic epistles, Pauline epistles, Gospels, Book of Psalms with Hymns.

== Text ==
The Greek text of the codex is a representative of the Byzantine text-type. According to Hermann von Soden it represents recension established by Lucian in Antioch about A.D. 300. Aland placed it in Category V. According to the Claremont Profile Method it has mixture of the Byzantine families in Luke 1, Luke 10, and Luke 20, with some relationship to Π groups.

== History ==
Oscar von Gebhardt saw the manuscript in 1882, C. R. Gregory in 1886.

The manuscript was added to the list of New Testament manuscripts by Scholz (1794–1852).

The manuscript is currently housed at the Biblioteca Vallicelliana (E. 22) in Rome.

== See also ==
- List of New Testament minuscules
- Biblical manuscript
- Textual criticism
