= Minuscule 397 =

- New Testament manuscript
- Text: Gospel of John
- Date: 10th/11th century
- Script: Greek
- Now at: Biblioteca Vallicelliana
- Size: 28 cm by 23.5 cm
- Category: none

Minuscule 397 (in the Gregory-Aland numbering), C^{ι10} (Soden), is a Greek minuscule manuscript of the New Testament, on parchment. Paleographically it has been assigned to the 10th or 11th century.

== Description ==
The codex contains the text of the Gospel of John on 295 parchment leaves (28 cm by 23.5 cm) with catenae. It is written in one column per page, in 27 lines per page.

Kurt Aland did not place the Greek text of the codex in any Category.

In John 9:35 it has reading εις τον υιον του ανθρωπου (in the Son of Man); the reading is supported by 𝔓^{66}, 𝔓^{75}, Sinaiticus, Vaticanus, Bezae, Washingtonianus, it^{d}, syr^{c}, co^{sa}, and eth^{ro}.

In John 14:14 it has textual variant εαν τι αιτησητε τον πατερα instead of εαν τι αιτησητε με. The same variant appears in minuscule 249.

== History ==
Scrivener dated the manuscript to the 15th century.

The manuscript was added to the list of New Testament manuscripts by Scholz (1794–1852) with a number 397. The manuscript was described by Giuseppe Bianchini. Scrivener in the 3rd edition of his "A Plain Introduction to the Criticism of the New Testament" catalogued it twice, as 397 and 617. In the 4th edition, this was corrected and number 617 was given to the other manuscript. C. R. Gregory saw it in 1886.

The manuscript is currently housed at the Biblioteca Vallicelliana (E. 40) in Rome.

== See also ==
- List of New Testament minuscules
- Biblical manuscript
- Textual criticism
