= Minuscule 249 =

- New Testament manuscript
- Text: Gospel of John
- Date: 12th century
- Script: Greek
- Now at: State Historical Museum
- Size: 31 cm by 23.5 cm
- Type: Byzantine text-type/mixed
- Category: none
- Note: catena

Minuscule 249 (in the Gregory-Aland numbering), N^{L10} (Soden), is a Greek minuscule manuscript of the New Testament, on parchment. Palaeographically it has been assigned to the 12th century.

== Description ==
The codex contains the text of the Gospel of John on 808 parchment leaves (31 cm by 23.5 cm). The text is written in 1 column per page, 30 lines per page. The text of the Gospel of John is surrounded by a commentary (catena) of Nicetas's authorship.

The Greek text of the codex is a mixture of the text types. Aland did not list it to any Category.

In John 14:14 it has textual variant εαν τι αιτησητε τον πατερα instead of εαν τι αιτησητε με. The same variant appears in minuscule 397.

It is difficult to date on palaeographical grounds.

== History ==
According to F. H. A. Scrivener and Hermann von Soden the manuscript was written in the 11th century. Currently it is dated by the INTF to the 12th century.

Formerly the manuscript was held at the Pantokrator monastery at Athos peninsula (as codex 74). It was brought to Moscow, by the monk Arsenius, on the suggestion of the Patriarch Nikon, in the reign of Alexei Mikhailovich Romanov (1645-1676). It was examined by Matthaei and Treu.

The manuscript is currently housed at the State Historical Museum (V. 90, S. 93) at Moscow.

== See also ==
- Minuscule 250
- Minuscule 248
- List of New Testament minuscules
- Biblical manuscript
- Textual criticism
