= Graphometer =

Surveying instrument for angle measurements

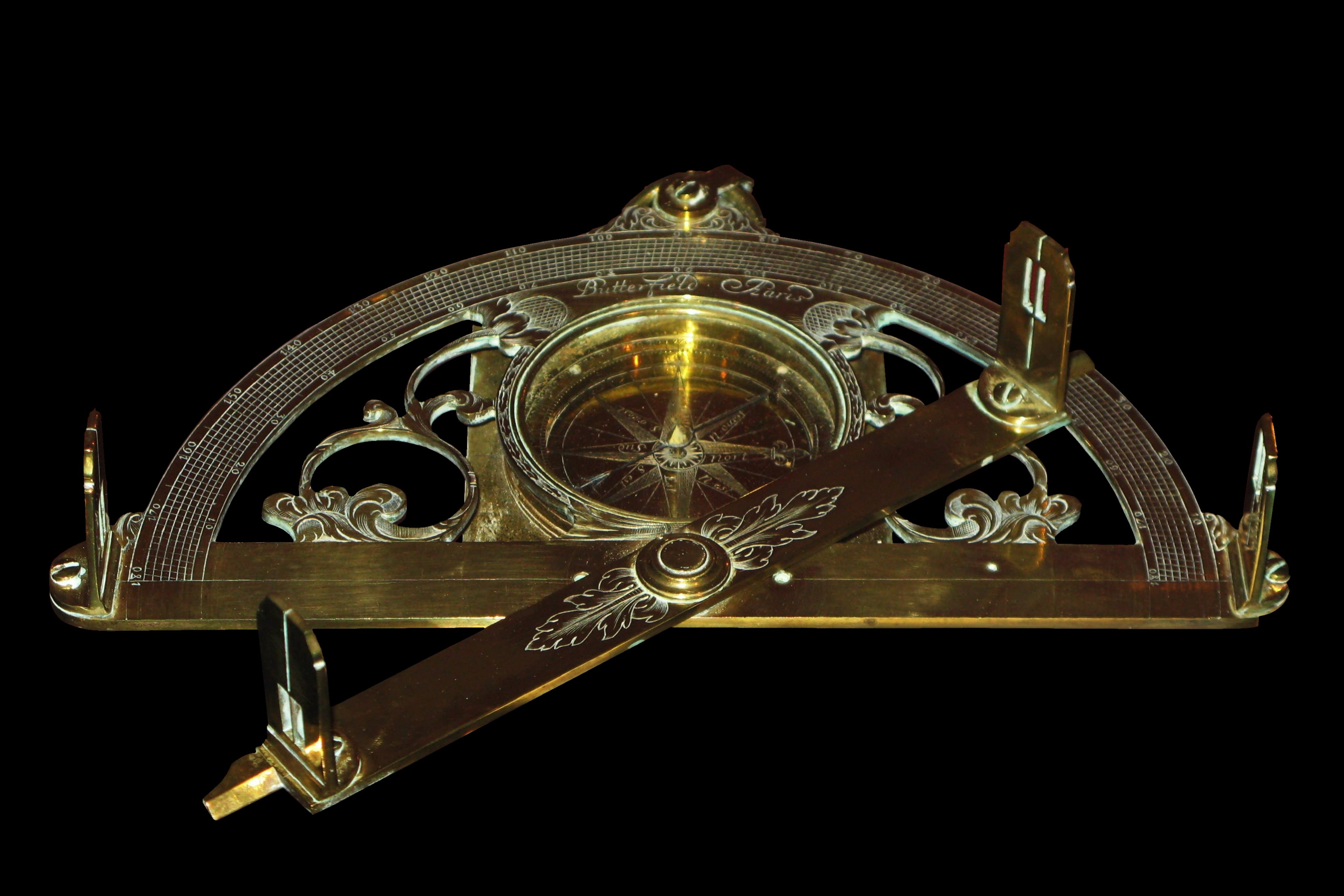
Butterfield compass graphometer

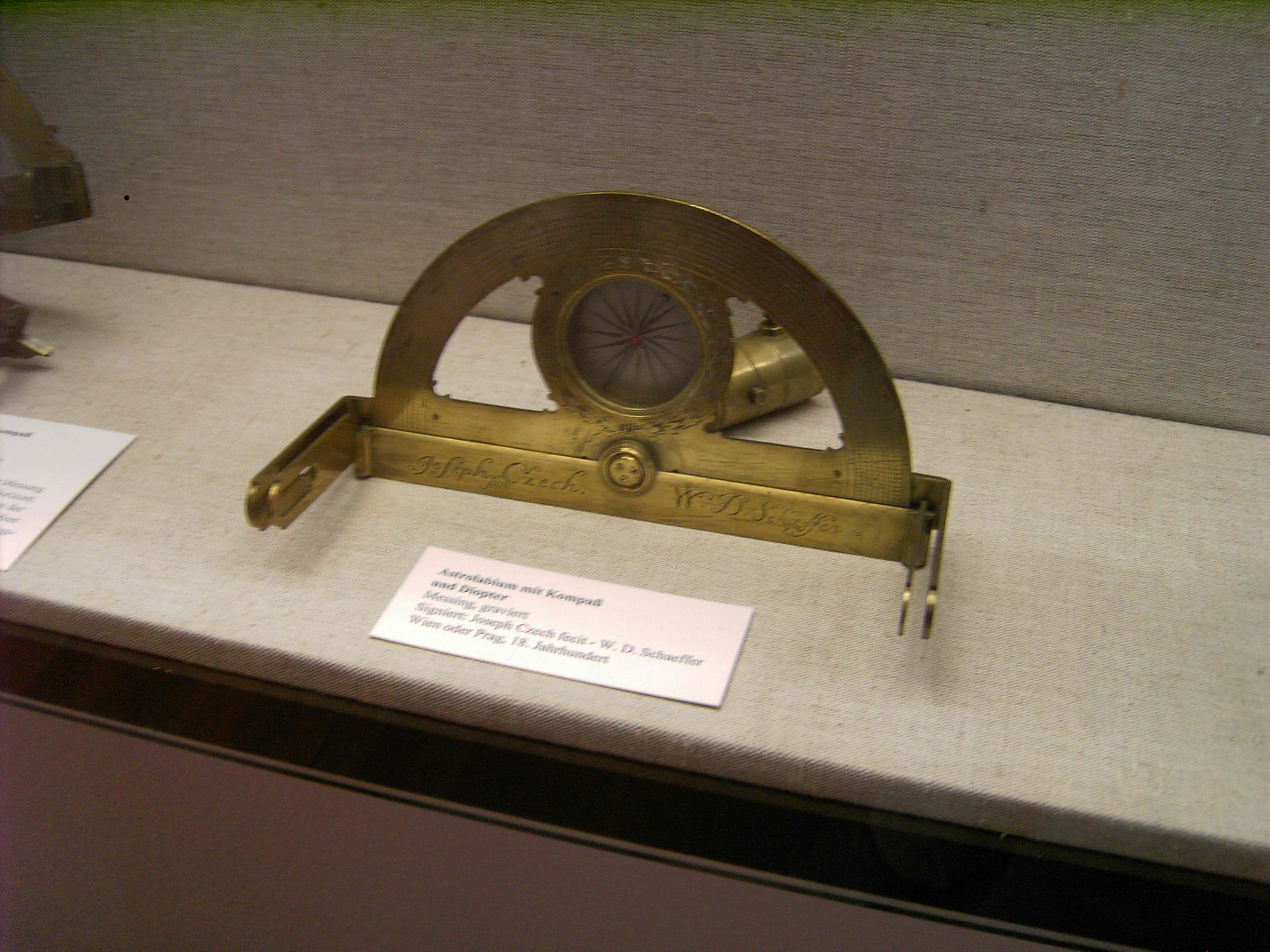
A German graphometer in Göttingen, Stadtmuseum. The instrument is on its side. At the back, the socket for a Jacob's staff can be seen.

The graphometer, semicircle or semicircumferentor is a surveying instrument used for angle measurements. It consists of a semicircular limb divided into 180 degrees and sometimes subdivided into minutes. The limb is subtended by the diameter with two sights at its ends. In the middle of the diameter a "box and needle" (compass) is fixed. On the same middle the alidade with two other sights is fitted. The device is mounted on a staff via a ball and socket joint. In effect the device is a half-circumferentor. For convenience, sometimes another half-circle from 180 to 360 degrees may be graduated in another line on the limb.

The form was introduced in Philippe Danfrie's Déclaration de l’usage du graphomètre (Paris, 1597) and the term graphometer was popular with French geodesists. The preferable English-language terms were semicircle or semicircumferentor. Some 19th-century graphometers had telescopic rather than open sights.

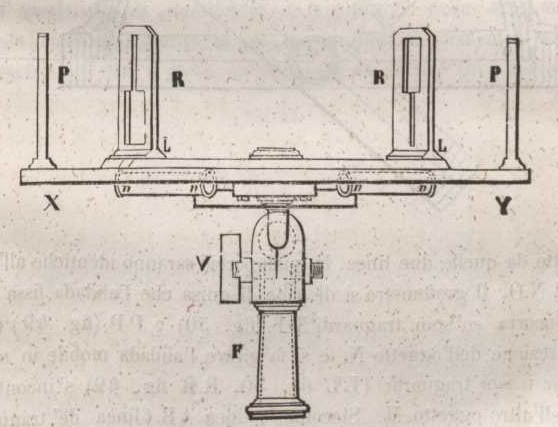
19th century graphometer

Le Nôtre's La theorie et la pratique du jardinage ('The theory and practice of gardening'), published in 1709, described the use of the graphometer in transferring geometric shapes from garden plans onto landscapes at a large scale.

== Usage ==
Figure 1: Angle EKG

To measure an angle, say, EKG, the diameter middle C is placed at the angle apex K using the plummet at point C of the instrument. The diameter is aligned with leg KE of the angle using the sights at the ends of the diameter. The alidade is aligned with the leg KG using another pair of sights, and the angle read off the limb as marked by the alidade. Further uses of the graphometer are the same as those of the circumferentor.
