= Minuscule 169 =

- New Testament manuscript
- Name: Codex Vallicellianus B
- Text: Gospels
- Date: 11th century
- Script: Greek
- Now at: Biblioteca Vallicelliana
- Size: 12 cm by 10 cm
- Type: Byzantine text-type
- Category: V
- Note: marginalia

Minuscule 169 (in the Gregory-Aland numbering), ε 305 (Soden), is a Greek minuscule manuscript of the New Testament, on parchment. Palaeographically, it has been assigned to the 11th century. It has marginalia.

== Description ==
The codex contains a complete text of the four Gospels on 252 parchment leaves (size 12 cm by 10 cm). The text is written in one column per page, in 19 lines per page, in light-brown ink. The large initial letters are written in gold.

The text is divided according to the κεφαλαια (chapters), whose numbers are given at the margin, and the τιτλοι (titles of chapters) at the top of the pages. There is also the Ammonian Sections (in Mark 233 sections, the last section in 16:8), with references to the Eusebian Canons (written below Ammonian Section numbers).

It contains Prolegomena, tables of the κεφαλαια (tables of contents) before each Gospel, subscriptions at the end of each Gospel, synaxaria, Menologion, and pictures.

== Text ==
The Greek text of the codex is a representative of the Byzantine text-type. According to Hermann von Soden it is related to the Byzantine commentated text (A^{k}). Aland placed it in Category V.

According to the Claremont Profile Method it represents the textual family K^{x} in Luke 1 and Luke 20, with some relationship to cluster 1442. In Luke 10 no profile was made.

The pericope Pericope Adulterae (John 7:53-8:11) is omitted.

== History ==
The manuscript was once in the property of Achilles Statius, as also was minuscule 171.

It was examined by Bianchini, Birch (about 1782), and Scholz (1794-1852). C. R. Gregory saw it in 1886.

It is currently housed at the Biblioteca Vallicelliana (B. 133), at Rome.

== See also ==
- List of New Testament minuscules
- Biblical manuscript
- Textual criticism
