= Minuscule 170 =

- New Testament manuscript
- Name: Codex Vallicellianus C
- Text: Gospels †
- Date: 13th century
- Script: Greek
- Now at: Biblioteca Vallicelliana
- Size: 21.5 cm by 15.7 cm
- Type: Byzantine text-type
- Category: V
- Note: member of K^{r} marginalia

Minuscule 170 (in the Gregory-Aland numbering), ε 307 (Soden), is a Greek minuscule manuscript of the New Testament, on parchment. Palaeographically it has been assigned to the 13th century. It has marginalia.

== Description ==
The codex contains the text of the four Gospels on 277 parchment leaves (size 21.5 cm by 15.7 cm). The text is written in one column per page, in 23 lines per page. The text of Luke 16:7 and the most of John was written by a later hand from the 15th century.

The text is divided according to the κεφαλαια (chapters), whose numbers are given at the margin, the τιτλοι (titles of chapters) are given at the top of the pages. There is also a division according to the smaller Ammonian Sections, with references to the Eusebian Canons (written below Ammonian Section numbers).

It contains prolegomena, tables of the κεφαλαια (tables of contents) before each Gospel (occasionally inserted by later hand), lectionary equipment at the margin for liturgical use, αναγνωσεις (lessons), and numbers of στιχοι (occasionally by later hand). The Synaxarion and Menologion were added by later hand.

== Text ==
The Greek text of the codex is a representative of the Byzantine text-type. Aland placed it in Category V.

Hermann von Soden classified it to the textual family K^{r}. According to the Claremont Profile Method it belongs to the textual family K^{r} in Luke 1 and Luke 20. In Luke 10 no profile was made. It belongs to subgroup 35.

== History ==
Currently the manuscript is dated to the 13th century.

It was examined by Bianchini, Birch (about 1782), and Scholz. C. R. Gregory saw it in 1886.

It is currently housed at the Biblioteca Vallicelliana (C. 61), at Rome.

== See also ==
- List of New Testament minuscules
- Biblical manuscript
- Textual criticism
