= Richard Breton =

16th century French publisher

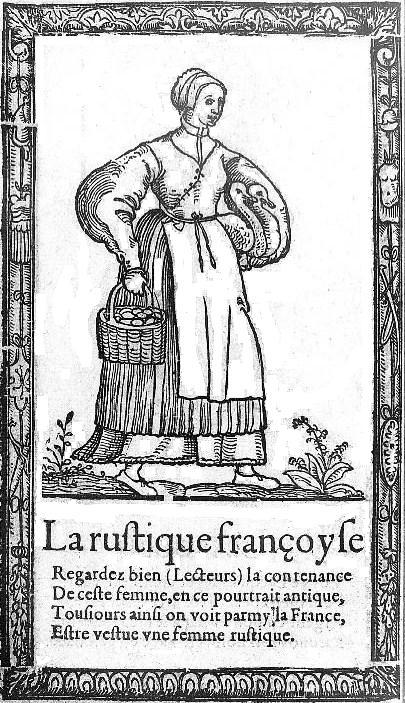
Costume of the French countrywoman, woodcut from Breton's Recueil des Habits (1564)

Richard Breton (1524–1571) was a French publisher of illustrated books in collaboration with François Desprez.

== Biography ==
Breton, the son of Guillaume Le Breton, was a publisher and book illustrator and bookbinder at the French court for Catherine de' Medici. For his printer's mark he used an allegorical figure of Charity holding a Sacred Heart, with a crown, a sceptre, a mitre, and a hoe symbolizing labour. He collaborated with Philippe Danfrie, adopting Danfrie's musical type in his publications. Breton and his partner Francois Desprez bought Danfrie's dies and type in 1559.

Breton produced the costume book, Recueil de la diversité des Habits qui sont des present en usaige tant es Pays D'Europe, Asie, Afrique, et isles sauvages, (Paris 1562) with 121 woodcuts, and a dedication to Henry of Navarre by his colleague François Desprez. The first edition was printed in Civilité type, a special italic typeface used for children's books. Two subsequent editions in Breton's lifetime employed roman type.

Breton published the pseudo-Rabelaisian Les songes drolatiques de Pantagruel, (Paris 1565), which featured 224 fanciful grotesque figures, and was also a collaboration with François Desprez. Four illustrations from the Songes were used on a Scottish Renaissance painted ceiling at Prestongrange, in 1581. Nicolas Elphinstone gave James VI a copy, and another was in the library of Adam Bothwell, Bishop of Orkney who died in 1593.

At a time when the sale of Calvinist literature was permitted in France, Breton was active in promoting Protestant literature. Richard married Jeanne Warnier, they had a daughters Jeanne and Anne, and a son Thomas. Richard's sister Nicole Breton married René Guillon, a teacher of ancient languages at the University of Paris.

== François Desprez ==
The preface or letter of dedication for Breton's Recueil des Habits (1562) was signed by 'François De Serpz.' In this text, François claimed to have authored the book, and followed drawings of costumes made by others, including 'Roberval, sea-captain of the King.' Desprez, like Breton, was a Parisian bookseller and publisher. Some illustrations issued by him, including those of the Recueil des Effigies des Roys de France (1567), are of lesser quality than the Songes or the Recueil des Habits.. The exact roles of Breton and Desprez in the production of their illustrated book collaborations are unclear.

Desprez is also known as a designer and maker of embroidery for purses, as a 'Maistre Boursier.' He published a map of La Rochelle, and was recorded working in Paris between 1556 and 1580.
