= Gonzalo de Illescas (historian) =

Spanish historian and abbot

Gonzalo de Illescas (1521–1574?) was a Spanish historian and abbot. Born in Dueñas, Palencia province, he was abbot of San Frontís de Zamora. He studied at Salamanca, and may have earned a degree in theology. He traveled in Italy (Venice, 1550; Rome, 1551).

He translated works from Latin and composed and published in various editions a Historia pontifical y cathólica (Pontifical and Catholic History). It recounts the lives of the popes from Saint Peter to Boniface VIII (1301), as well as the Visigothic Kings, the Kings of Castile, and the Kings of Portugal.
