= Les Songes drolatiques de Pantagruel =

16th century woodcut picture book

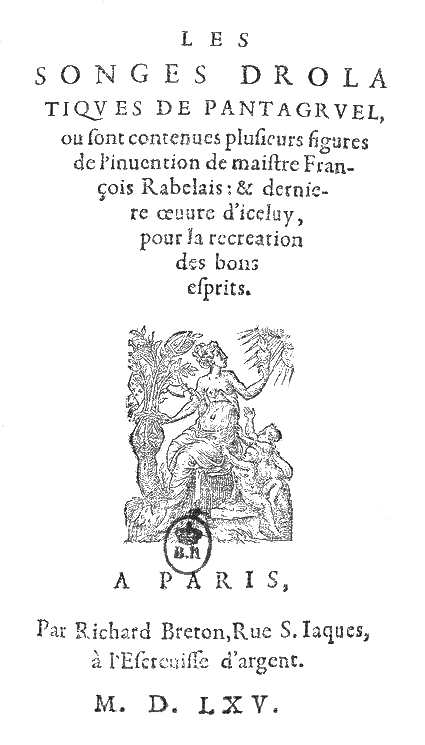
- Author: Richard Breton
- Illustrator: François Desprez (?)
- Genre: Picture book
- Published: 1565
- Publication place: France
- Media type: Woodcut

Les Songes drolatiques de Pantagruel (The Drolatic Dreams of Pantagruel) is a woodcut picture book published in 1565 by French illustrator Richard Breton. While Breton released the book, he did not illustrate it. Its original illustrator is unknown, but is speculated to be engraver François Desprez.

== Background ==
Published roughly a decade after the death of François Rabelais, a prominent writer and humanist in France, Les Songes drolatiques was attributed to Rabelais by its publisher. Its title refers to the title character of Rabelais' most famous work, Pantagruel, and Breton claims in the preface that the pictures represent the last works of Rabelais before he died. The word "drolatic" is an archaic term coming from French "drolatique", meaning "humorous" or "amusing". In the title it functions as an adjective for "dream", suggesting that the images were supposed to have been taken from the dreams of the giant Pantagruel.

== Contents ==
Les Songes drolatiques consists of 120 woodcut images of monstrous creatures dressed in contemporary clothing in fantastical situations. The style of the woodcuts is reflective of the bizarre style of previous artists such as Bruegel the Elder or Hieronymus Bosch. Beyond Breton's preface, there is no text in the book; each page is taken up solely by a single woodcut image. This separates them from the works of Bruegel or Bosch, as well as the fact that the character of the images is focused on the dress and appearance of the figures, rather than their behavior or interactions with one another.

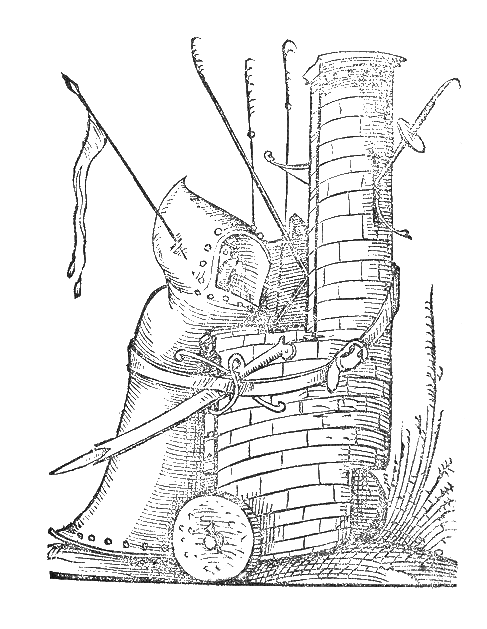

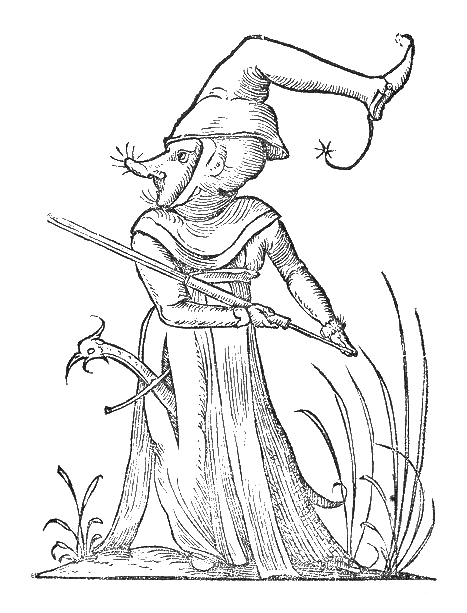

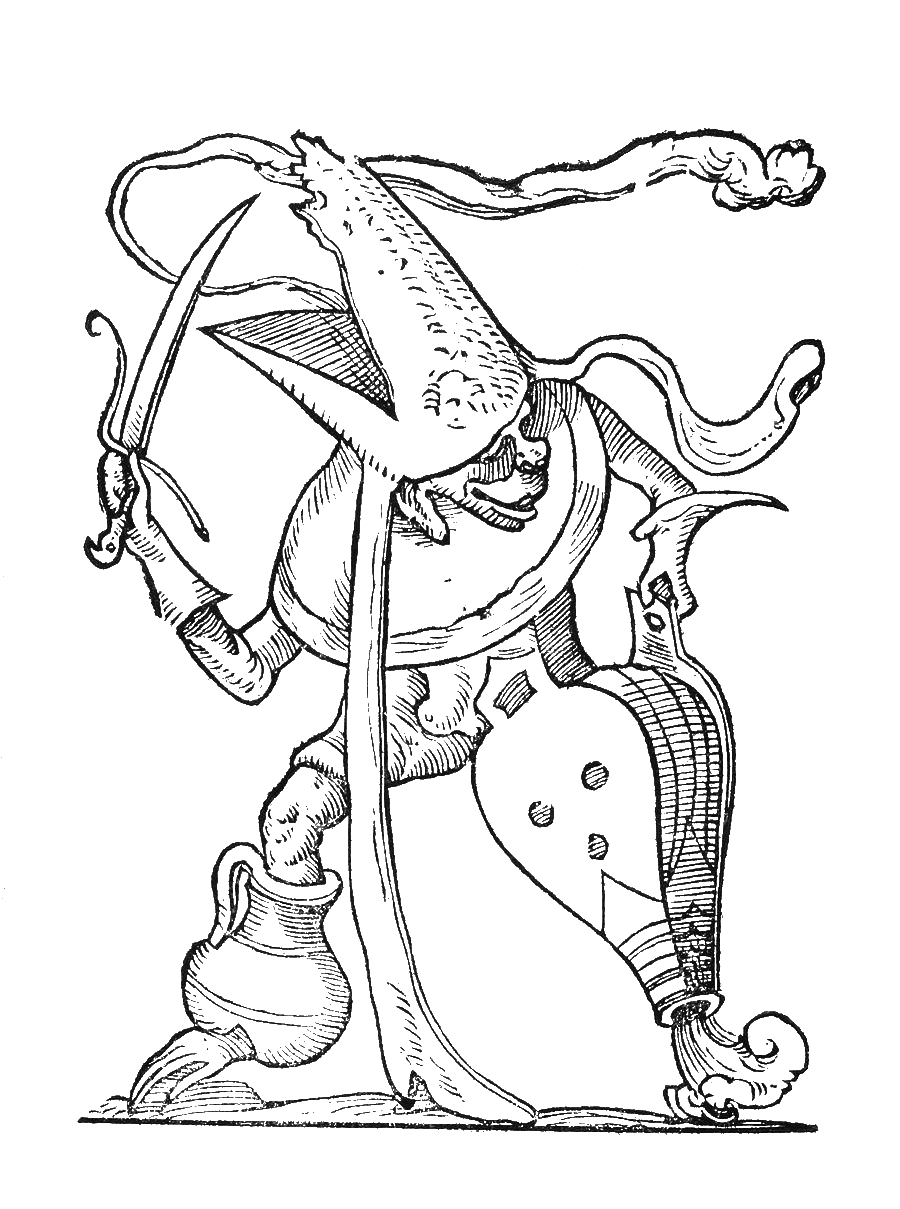

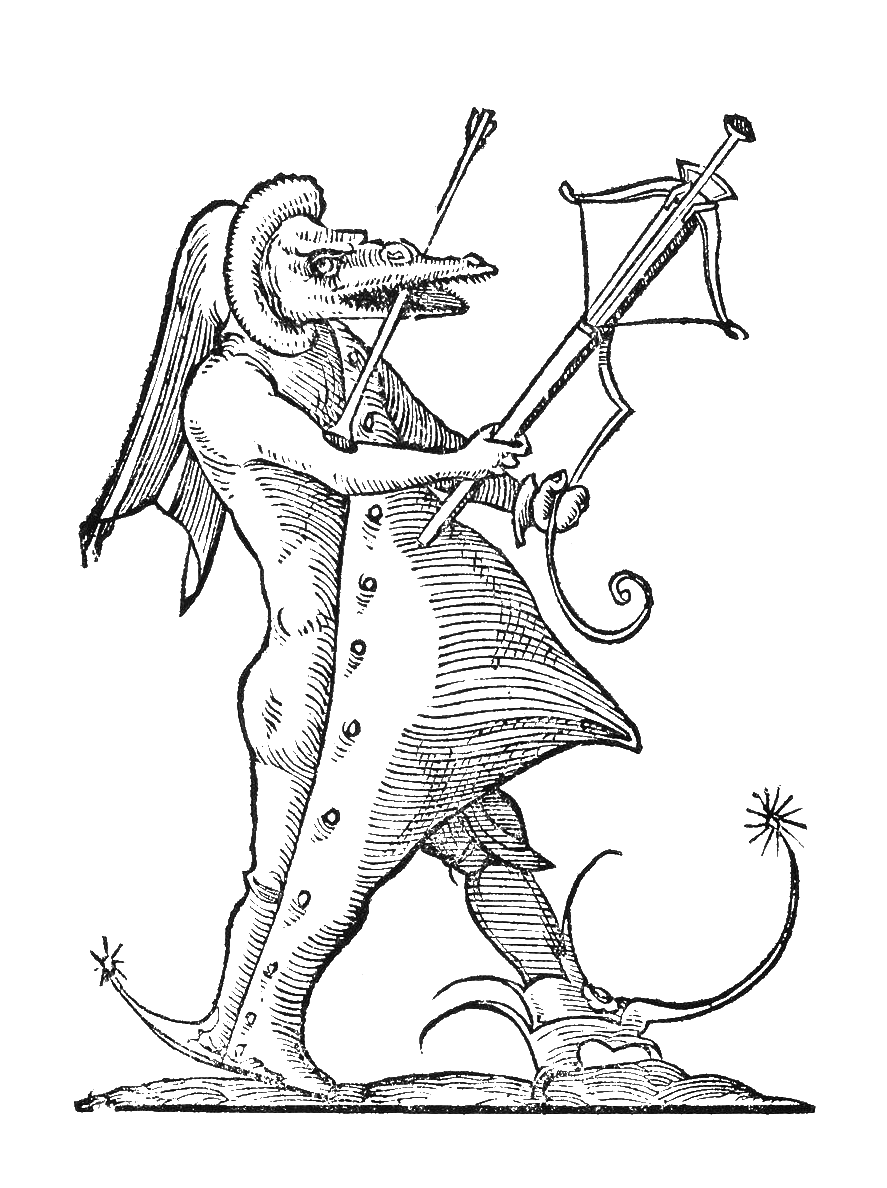

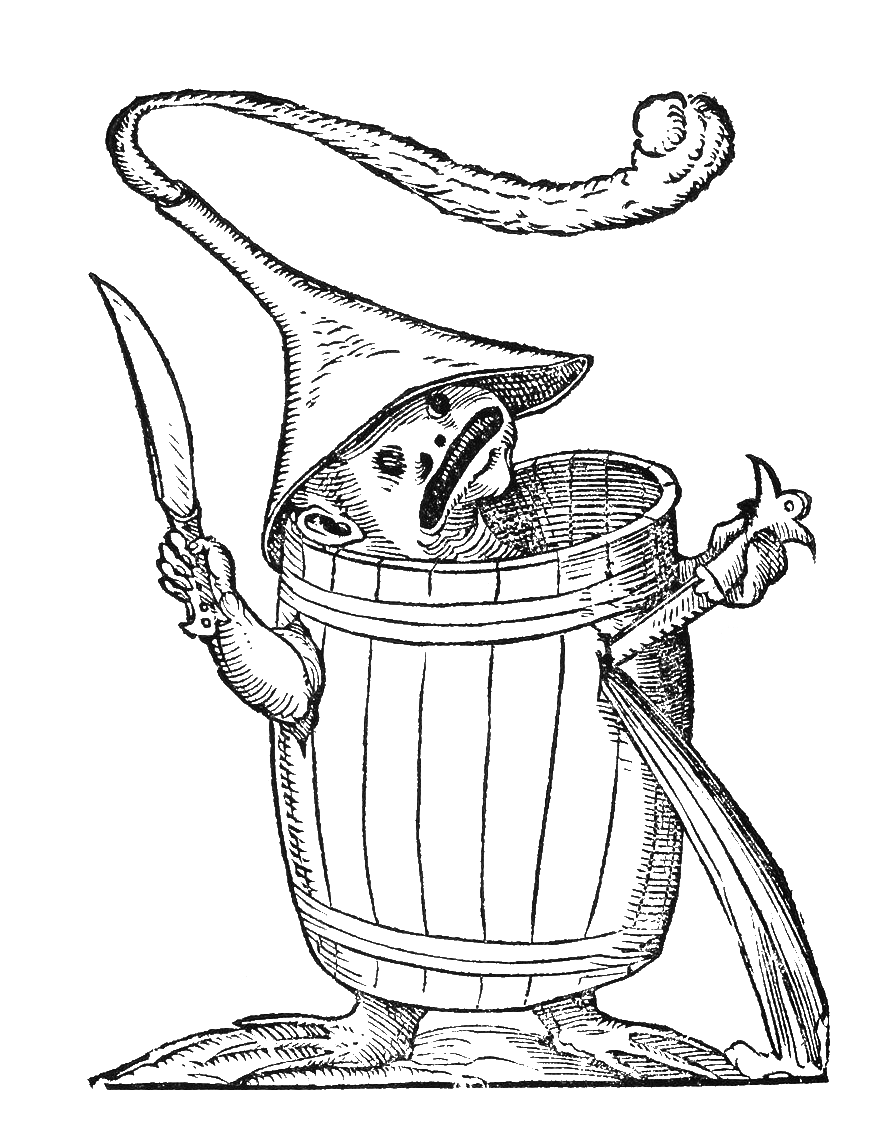

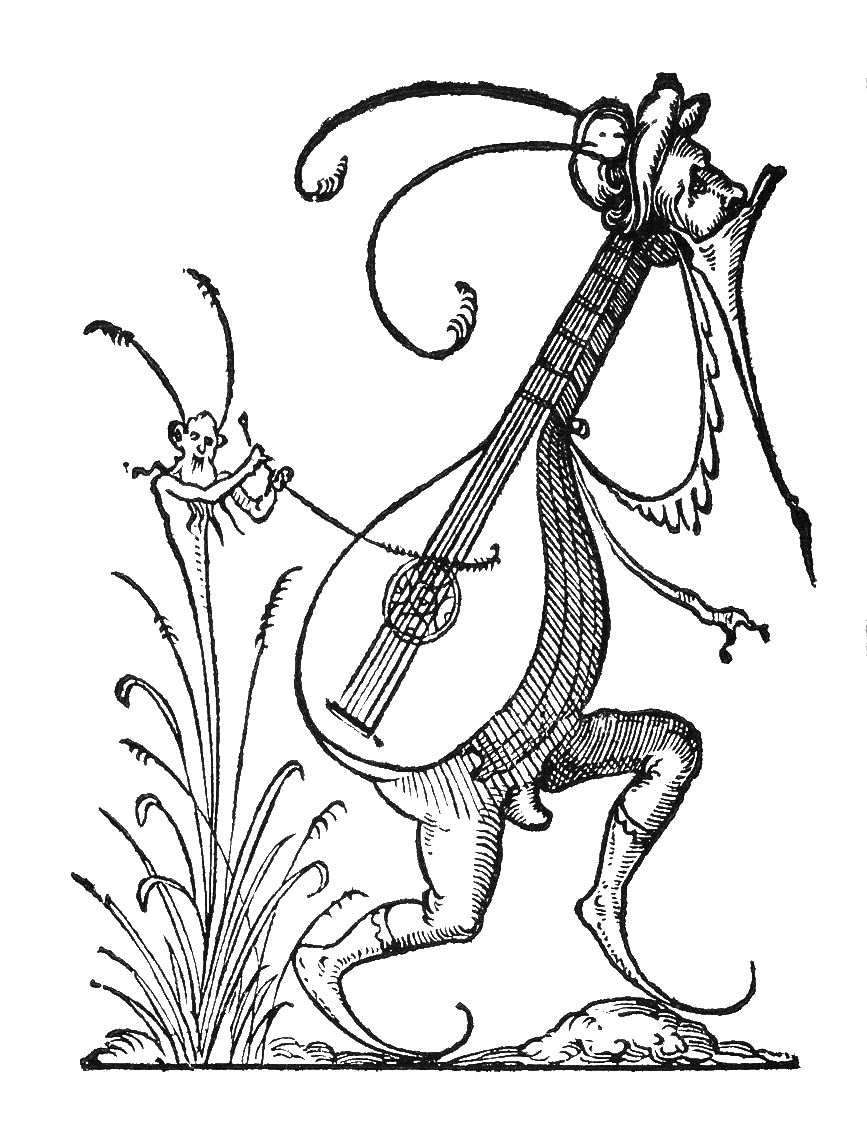

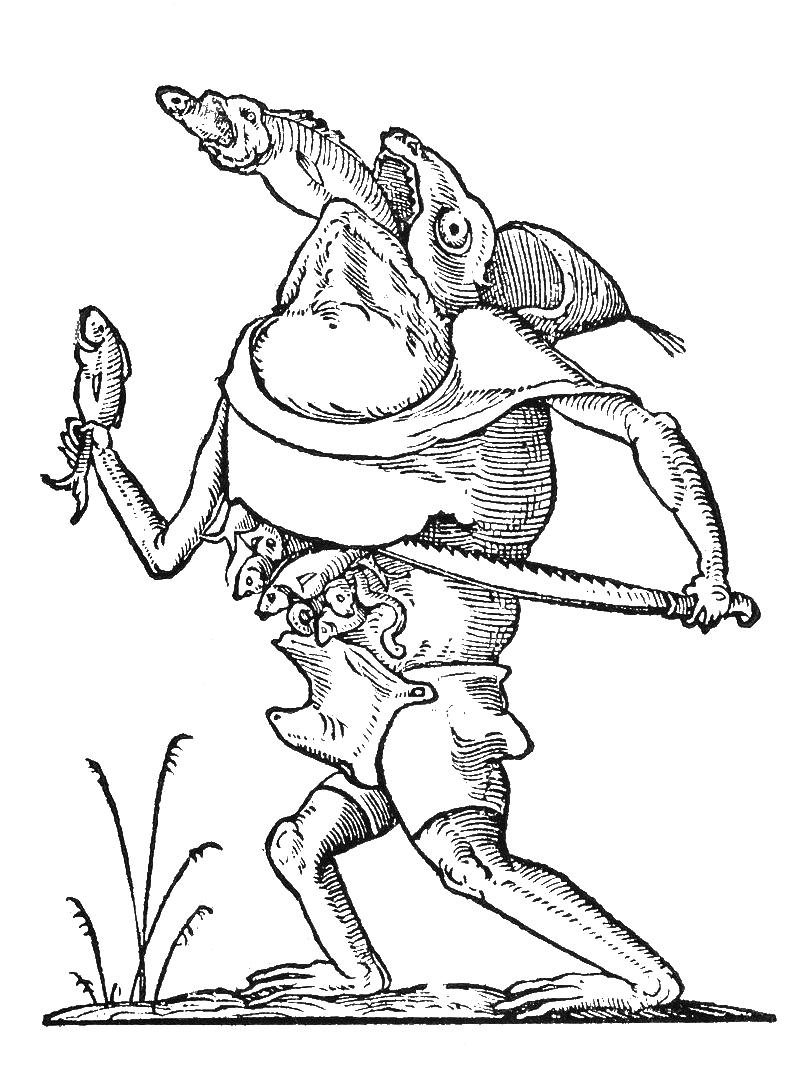

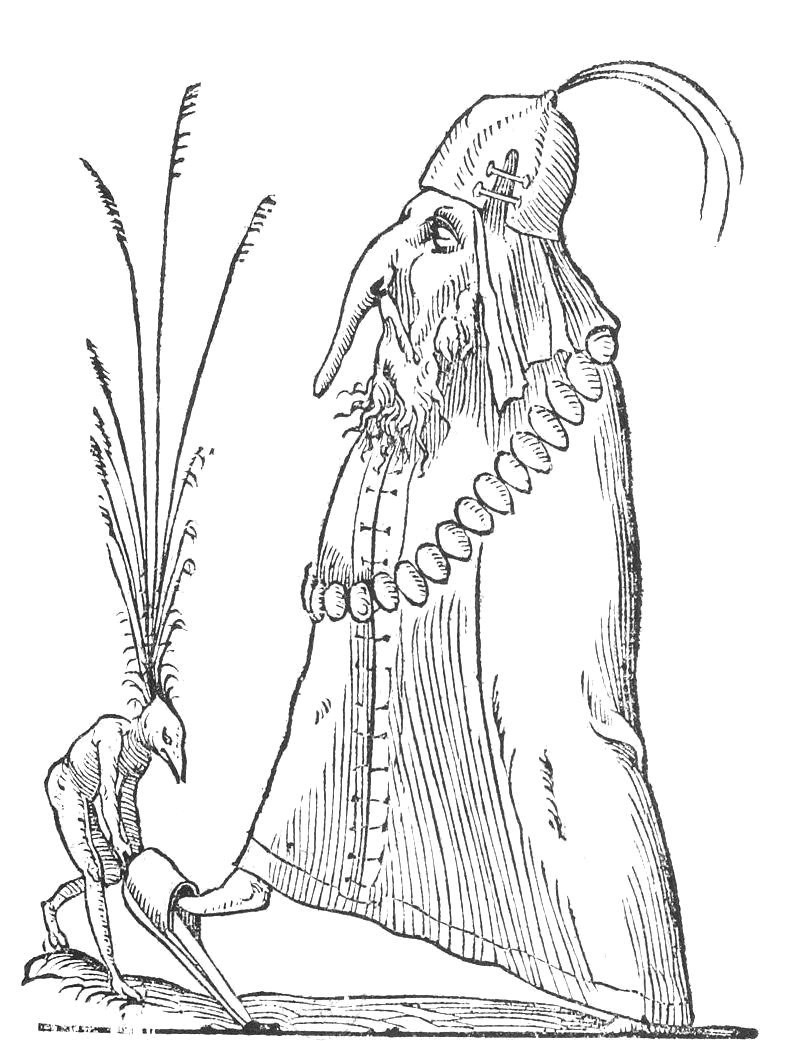

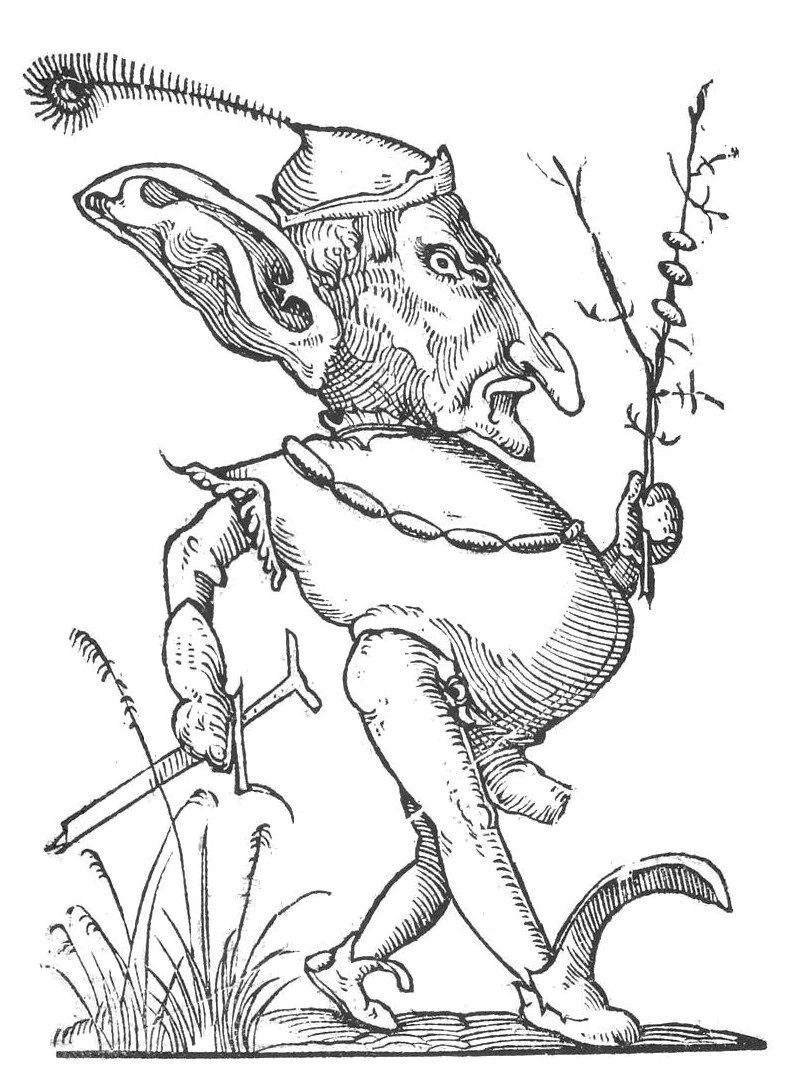

== Impact ==
The picture book was met with positive reception, and played an important role in introducing the works of Rabelais to England. Les Songes drolatiques were referenced in English masques, or plays, but the book was already known before it was incorporated into the masques. Edward Dyer was the first to explicitly mention Les songes in his book The Prayse of Nothing, and the first masque to include a reference to the images was Ben Jonson's The Vision of Delight in 1617.

== Reproductions ==
In 1869, Les songes drolatiques was reproduced and reprinted by Louis Perrin of Lyon. The new edition included an introduction by Perrin which discussed the symbolism and meaning of the images in the book.

Salvador Dali was also inspired by the woodcuts, producing a series of 23 lithographs in 1973 which also bore the name Les songes drolatiques de Pantagruel. Each numbered with Roman numerals, the lithographs were printed in black on thin Japanese paper.
