= Biblioteca Vallicelliana =

Library in Italy

Vallicelliana Library
- Biblioteca Vallicelliana
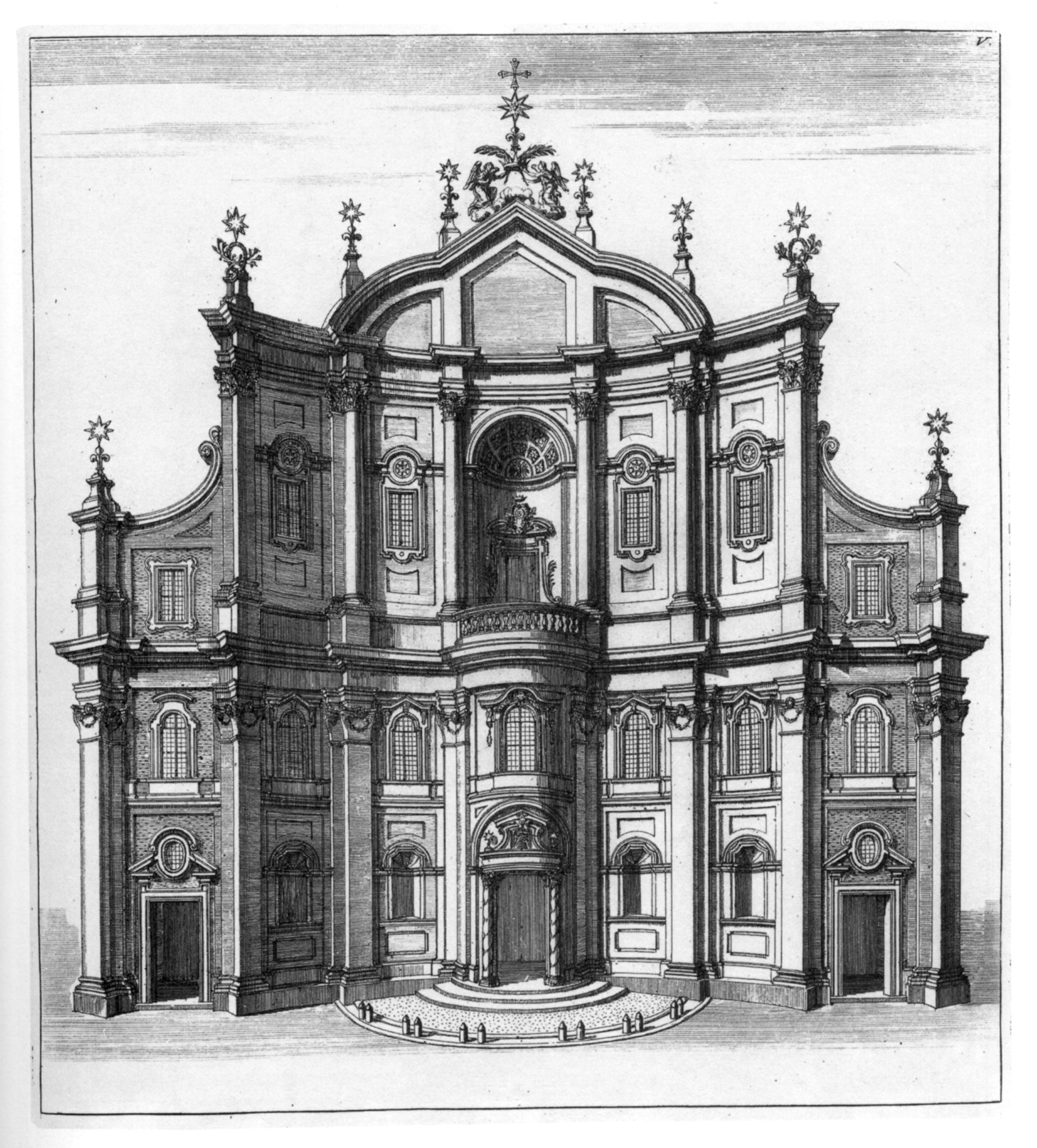
- Domenico Barrière, Façade of the Oratorio dei Filippini, 1658 for Roma ricercata nel suo sito
- 41.89829219483768°N 12.469766463470876°E
- Location: Rome, Italy
- Established: 1569

Collection
- Size: 289,859 item (2019), 3,191 item (2019), 159,139 item (2020), 159,490 item (2021), 273,673 volume, 435 item

The Biblioteca Vallicelliana is a library in Rome, Italy. The library is located in the Oratorio dei Filippini complex built by Francesco Borromini in Piazza della Chiesa Nuova.

The library holds about 130,000 volumes of manuscripts, incunabula, and books. Among these, there are about 3,000 manuscripts written in Latin and Greek, including a Bible which belonged to Alcuin dating to the 9th century and a lectionary from the 12th century. The library holds documents from the time of the Reformation and Counter-Reformation.

== History ==
The library was established in 1565 by St Filippo Neri who left his collection to the congregation past his death in 1595. Pope Gregory XIII officially recognized the library in 1575 with the bull "Copiosus in misericordia". The library was mentioned in 1581 when Achille Stazio donated 1,700 printed volumes and 300 manuscripts to Filippo Neri and the Congregation of the Oratory. The Archive and part of the Library of San Giovanni n Venere was donated in 1585. In 1604, there were more donations to the library in the form of books of Pierre Morin and Giovenale Ancina. In 1607, Cardinal Cesare Baronio died and left a part of his library to the Vallicelliana. The first library was partially destroyed by a fire in 1620. The current building was built in the subsequent years. In 1644, the Borromini Hall was inaugurated by Francesco Borromini. Borromini directed the construction from 1637 to 1652, and was continued by Camillo Arcucci in 1649 and finished in 1667. In 1669 Leone Allacci presented to the library 243 volumes, 137 Latin and 106 Greek (Fondo Allacci), in 1764 Giuseppe Bianchini presented 293 volumes (Fondo Bianchini), in 1843 Ruggero Falzacappa presented 79 volumes of documents from 17-19th centuries (Fondo Falzacappa).

== Manuscripts ==
In the library are housed the biblical manuscripts: Minuscule 169, 170, 171, 393, 394, 397. The library covers multiple topics, including history, philology, archeology, theology, and more.
