= Uncial 0306 =

- New Testament manuscript
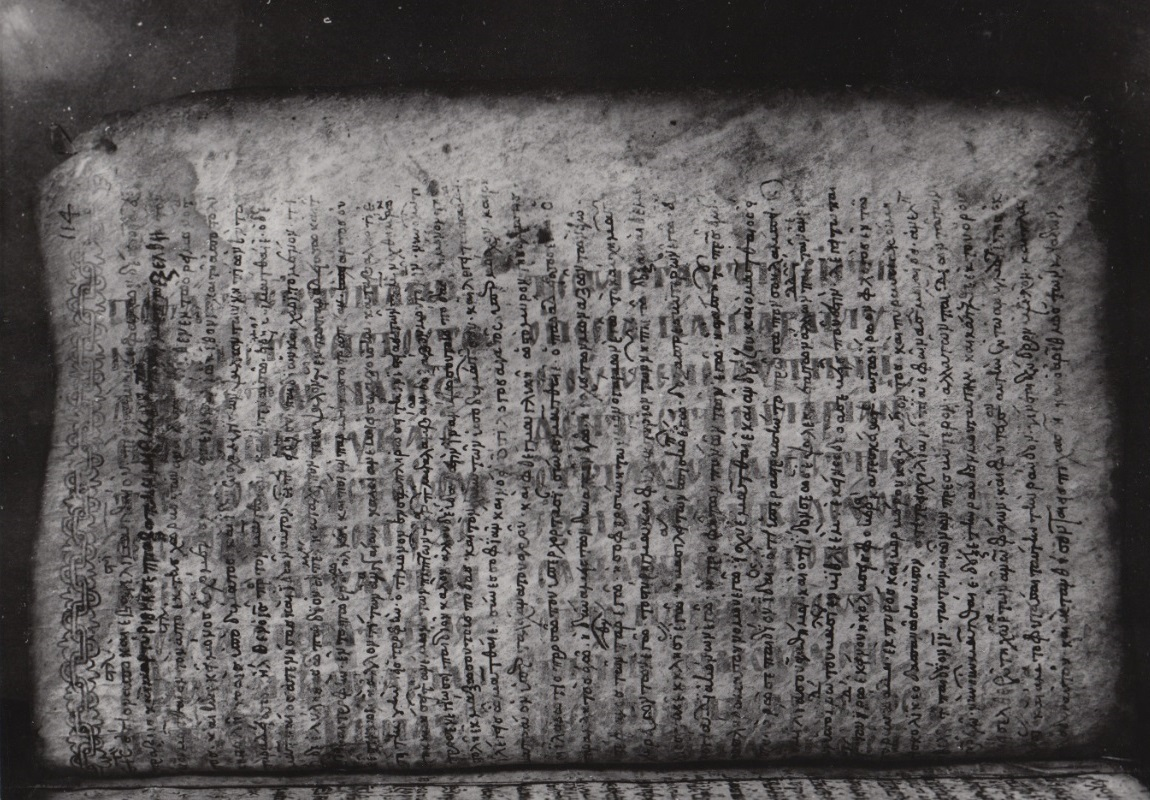
- Text: John 9-10; 11 †
- Date: 9th century
- Script: Greek
- Now at: Bodleian Library
- Size: 29 x 22.5 cm
- Category: none

Uncial 0306 (in the Gregory-Aland numbering), is a Greek uncial manuscript of the New Testament. Paleographically it has been assigned to the 9th century.

== Description ==
The codex contains a small texts of the Gospel of John 9:22-10:3.5-8.10-12; 11:6-37.39-41, on 7 illuminated parchment leaves (29 cm by 22.5 cm). It is written in two columns per page, 25 lines per page, in uncial letters. It is a palimpsest. The upper text belongs to the lectionary ℓ 368.

Currently it is dated by the INTF to the 9th century.

The Text was published in 2007.

It is currently housed at the Bodleian Library (Selden Supra 9, fol. 114-120) in Oxford.

== See also ==
- List of New Testament uncials
- Biblical manuscripts
- Textual criticism
