= Lectionary 261 =

Lectionary ℓ 261
- New Testament manuscript
- Text: Evangelistarium
- Date: 12th century
- Script: Greek
- Now at: Bibliothèque nationale de France
- Size: 33.1 cm by 27.5 cm
- Note: musical notes

Lectionary 261, designated by siglum ℓ 261 (in the Gregory-Aland numbering) is a Greek manuscript of the New Testament, on parchment. Palaeographically it has been assigned to the 12th century. Scrivener labelled it as 158^{e}, Gregory by 158^{e}. The manuscript has complex contents.

== Description ==
The codex contains lessons from the Gospel of John, Matthew, and Luke (Evangelistarium), with numerous lacunae.

The text is written in Greek large minuscule letters, on 207 parchment leaves (33.1 cm by 27.5 cm), in two columns per page, 24 lines per page. The initial letters are rubricated, it contains musical notes (in red) and pictures. The manuscript is beautifully illuminated.

The manuscript contains weekday Gospel lessons from Easter to Pentecost and Saturday/Sunday Gospel lessons for the other weeks.

== History ==
Scrivener and Gregory dated the manuscript to the 12th century. It has been assigned by the Institute for New Testament Textual Research to the 12th century.

The manuscript was presented by ambassador Desalleurs to king in 1753.

The manuscript was added to the list of New Testament manuscripts by Scrivener (number 158^{e}) and Gregory (number 261^{e}). Gregory saw the manuscript in 1884.

The manuscript is not cited in the critical editions of the Greek New Testament (UBS3).

The codex is housed at the Bibliothèque nationale de France (Suppl. Gr. 27) in Paris.

== See also ==
- List of New Testament lectionaries
- Biblical manuscript
- Textual criticism

== Bibliography ==
- Gregory, Caspar René (1900). Textkritik des Neuen Testaments, Vol. 1. Leipzig. p. 409.
