= Lectionary 129 =

Lectionary ℓ 129
- New Testament manuscript
- Text: Evangelistarion
- Date: 12th century
- Script: Greek
- Now at: Vatican Library
- Size: 26.1 cm by 21.9 cm

Lectionary 129, designated by siglum ℓ 129 (in the Gregory-Aland numbering) is a Greek manuscript of the New Testament, on parchment leaves. Palaeographically it has been assigned to the 12th century.

== Description ==
The codex contains lessons from the Gospels of John, Matthew, Luke lectionary (Evangelistarium) with some lacunae at the end. The codex contains 339 parchment leaves (26.1 cm by 21.9 cm). The text is written in Greek minuscule letters, in two columns per page, 24 lines per page. The lacuna at the end was supplied by 15th century hand on paper (71 leaves).

It has an unusual text.

== History ==
According to Scrivener folios 1-40 have been written in France, folios 41-220 by another hand. The manuscript was added to the list of New Testament manuscripts by Scholz. It was examined by Scholz, Stevenson, and Gregory.

The manuscript is not cited in the critical editions of the Greek New Testament (UBS3).

Currently the codex is located in the Vatican Library (Vat. gr. 2133) in Rome.

== See also ==
- List of New Testament lectionaries
- Biblical manuscript
- Textual criticism

== Bibliography ==
- J. M. A. Scholz, Biblisch-kritische Reise in Frankreich, der Schweiz, Italien, Palästine und im Archipel in den Jahren 1818, 1819, 1820, 1821: Nebst einer Geschichte des Textes des Neuen Testaments, p. 104 f.
- Henry Stevenson, Codd. mss. Gr. reginae Svecorum et Pii pp. II bibliothecae Vaticanae, Rome 1888, p. 159.
