= Lectionary 262 =

Lectionary ℓ 262
- New Testament manuscript
- Text: Evangelistarium
- Date: 17th century
- Script: Greek
- Now at: Bibliothèque nationale de France
- Size: 41.7 cm by 27.4 cm
- Note: oriental pictures

Lectionary 262, designated by siglum ℓ 262 (in the Gregory-Aland numbering) is a Greek manuscript of the New Testament, on paper. Palaeographically it has been assigned to the 17th century. Scrivener labelled it as 159^{e}, Gregory by 158^{e}. The manuscript has complex contents.

== Description ==
The codex contains lessons from the Gospel of John, Matthew, and Luke (Evangelistarium).

The text is written in Greek large minuscule letters, on 265 paper leaves (41.7 cm by 27.4 cm), in two columns per page, 27 lines per page. It contains oriental pictures; peculiarly bound.

The manuscript contains weekday Gospel lessons.

== History ==
Scrivener dated the manuscript to the 15th century, Gregory dated it to the 17th century. It is presently assigned by the INTF to the 17th century.

The manuscript was added to the list of New Testament manuscripts by Scrivener (number 159^{e}) and Gregory (number 262^{e}). Gregory saw the manuscript in 1885.

The manuscript is not cited in the critical editions of the Greek New Testament (UBS3).

Currently the codex is housed at the Bibliothèque nationale de France (Suppl. Gr. 242) in Paris.

== See also ==
- List of New Testament lectionaries
- Biblical manuscript
- Textual criticism

== Bibliography ==
- Gregory, Caspar René (1900). Textkritik des Neuen Testaments, Vol. 1. Leipzig. p. 409.
