= Lectionary 206 =

Lectionary ℓ 206
- New Testament manuscript
- Text: Evangelistarium
- Date: 11th century
- Script: Greek
- Now at: Bodleian Library
- Size: 30.8 cm by 23 cm

Lectionary 206, designated by siglum ℓ 206 (in the Gregory-Aland numbering) is a Greek manuscript of the New Testament, on parchment. Palaeographically it has been assigned to the 11th century. Scrivener labelled it by 213^{evl}. The manuscript is lacunose.

== Description ==
The codex contains lessons from the Gospels of John, Matthew, Luke lectionary (Evangelistarium), on 255 parchment leaves (30.8 cm by 23 cm). The text is written in Greek minuscule letters, in two columns per page, 14 lines per page, about 7 letters in line, in very large, bold, and peculiar letters. It contains musical notes.

There are daily lessons from Easter to Pentecost.

== History ==
Scrivener and Gregory dated it to the 11th century. It is presently assigned by the INTF to the 11th century.

The manuscript was added to the list of New Testament manuscripts by Scrivener (number 213) and Gregory (number 206). Gregory saw it in 1883.

Currently the codex is located in the Bodleian Library (Wake 13) at Oxford.

The manuscript is not cited in the critical editions of the Greek New Testament (UBS3).

In the 14th or 15th century four leaves were supplied to the manuscript (fol. I-IV), they are designated now as ℓ 2308.

== See also ==
- List of New Testament lectionaries
- Biblical manuscript
- Textual criticism

== Bibliography ==
- Gregory, Caspar René (1900). Textkritik des Neuen Testaments, Vol. 1. Leipzig. p. 404.
