= Lectionary 202 =

Lectionary ℓ 202
- New Testament manuscript
- Text: Evangelistarium
- Date: 12th century
- Script: Greek
- Found: 1727
- Now at: Bodleian Library
- Size: 27 cm by 22.5 cm

Lectionary 202, designated by siglum ℓ 202 (in the Gregory-Aland numbering) is a Greek manuscript of the New Testament, on parchment. Palaeographically it has been assigned to the 12th century. Scrivener labelled it by 210^{evl}. The manuscript has complex contents.

== Description ==
The codex contains lessons from the Gospels of John, Matthew, Luke lectionary (Evangelistarium), on 323 parchment leaves (27 cm by 22.5 cm). The text is written in Greek minuscule letters, in two columns per page, 22 lines per page. It contains musical notes and Menologion at the end.

There are weekday Gospel lessons.

== History ==
Scrivener dated the manuscript to the 11th century, Gregory dated it to the 12th century. It has been assigned by the Institute for New Testament Textual Research to the 12th century.

The manuscript was brought from Mount Athos in 1727. It was examined by Mangey.

The manuscript was added to the list of New Testament manuscripts by Scrivener (number 210) and Gregory (number 202). Gregory saw it in 1883.

The manuscript is not cited in the critical editions of the Greek New Testament (UBS3).

The codex is located in the Bodleian Library (Cromw. 27) in Oxford.

== See also ==
- List of New Testament lectionaries
- Biblical manuscript
- Textual criticism

== Bibliography ==
- Gregory, Caspar René (1900). Textkritik des Neuen Testaments, Vol. 1. Leipzig. p. 404.
