= Lectionary 194 =

Lectionary ℓ 194
- New Testament manuscript
- Text: Evangelistarion †
- Date: 10th century
- Script: Greek
- Now at: Bodleian Library
- Size: 32.5 cm by 23.5 cm
- Note: rubricated

Lectionary 194, designated by siglum ℓ 1943 (in the Gregory-Aland numbering) is a Greek manuscript of the New Testament, on parchment. Palaeographically it has been assigned to the 10th century. The manuscript is lacunose. Scrivener labelled it by 202^{evl}.

== Description ==
The codex contains lessons from the Gospels of John, Matthew, Luke lectionary (Evangelistarium) with numerous lacunae. It is written in Greek uncial letters, on 259 parchment leaves (32.5 cm by 23.5 cm), in two columns per page, 18 lines per page. The uncials are leaning a little to the left. Passages and directions are written in later minuscule hand. It contains musical notes.

There are daily lessons from Easter to Pentecost.

== History ==
Usually it is dated to the 10th century.

It was added to the list of New Testament manuscripts by Scrivener (number 202). Gregory saw it in 1883.

The manuscript is not cited in the critical editions of the Greek New Testament (UBS3).

Currently the codex is located in the Bodleian Library (Canonici Gr. 85) at Oxford.

== See also ==
- List of New Testament lectionaries
- Biblical manuscript
- Textual criticism

== Bibliography ==
- Alexander Turyn, Dated Greek Manuscripts of the Thirteenth and Fourteenth Centuries in the Libraries of Great Britain, Dumbarton Oaks Series XVII, (Washington, D. C., 1980), 67, p. 99.
