= Lectionary 207 =

Lectionary ℓ 207
- New Testament manuscript
- Text: Evangelistarium
- Date: 12th century
- Script: Greek
- Now at: Bodleian Library
- Size: 29.3 cm by 22.5 cm

Lectionary 207, designated by siglum ℓ 207 (in the Gregory-Aland numbering) is a Greek manuscript of the New Testament, on parchment. Palaeographically it has been assigned to the 12th century. Scrivener labelled it by 214^{evl}. The manuscript has complex context.

== Description ==
The codex contains lessons from the Gospels of John, Matthew, Luke lectionary (Evangelistarium), on 246 parchment leaves (29.3 cm by 22.5 cm). The text is written in Greek minuscule letters, in two columns per page, 19 lines per page (and more). It contains musical notes and pictures. The manuscript was written by several hands. One leaf is on paper, two leaves at the beginning and end from the Old Testament (1 Kings 17,12).

There are daily lessons from Easter to Pentecost.

== History ==
Scrivener and Gregory dated it to the 12th century. It is presently assigned by the INTF to the 12th century.

The manuscript was added to the list of New Testament manuscripts by Scrivener (number 214) and Gregory (number 207). Gregory saw it in 1883.

The manuscript is not cited in the critical editions of the Greek New Testament (UBS3).

Currently the codex is located in the Bodleian Library (Wake 14) at Oxford.

== See also ==
- List of New Testament lectionaries
- Biblical manuscript
- Textual criticism

== Bibliography ==
- Gregory, Caspar René (1900). Textkritik des Neuen Testaments. Vol. 1. Leipzig. p. 404.
