= Lectionary 195 =

Lectionary ℓ 195
- New Testament manuscript
- Text: Evangelistarion
- Date: 11th century
- Script: Greek
- Now at: Bodleian Library
- Size: 40.5 cm by 28.5 cm
- Hand: splendid

Lectionary 195, designated by siglum ℓ 195 (in the Gregory-Aland numbering) is a Greek manuscript of the New Testament, on parchment. Palaeographically it has been assigned to the 11th century. Scrivener labelled it by 203^{evl}.

== Description ==
The codex contains lessons from the Gospels of John, Matthew, Luke lectionary (Evangelistarium), on 483 parchment leaves (40.5 cm by 28.5 cm). It is written in Greek uncial letters, in two columns per page, 14 lines per page. It is very splendid, with gilt initial letters. It contains musical notes.

There are daily lessons from Easter to Pentecost.

== History ==
Scrivener and Gregory dated the manuscript to the 10th century. Today it is dated by the INTF to the 11th century.

It was added to the list of New Testament manuscripts by Scrivener (number 203). Gregory saw it in 1883.

The manuscript is not cited in the critical editions of the Greek New Testament (UBS3).

Currently the codex is located in the Bodleian Library (Canonici Gr. 92) at Oxford.

== See also ==
- List of New Testament lectionaries
- Biblical manuscript
- Textual criticism

== Bibliography ==
- Alexander Turyn, Dated Greek Manuscripts of the Thirteenth and Fourteenth Centuries in the Libraries of Great Britain, Dumbarton Oaks Series XVII, (Washington, D. C., 1980), 67, p. 99.
