= Lectionary 132 =

Lectionary ℓ 132
- New Testament manuscript
- Text: Evangelistarion
- Date: 14th century
- Script: Greek
- Now at: Vatican Library
- Size: 16.3 cm by 13.5 cm

Lectionary 132, designated by siglum ℓ 132 (in the Gregory-Aland numbering) is a Greek manuscript of the New Testament, on parchment leaves. Palaeographically it has been assigned to the 14th century.

== Description ==
The codex contains Lessons from the Gospels lectionary (Evangelistarium) with a large lacuna at the end. 53 leaves of the codex survived (16.37 cm by 13.5 cm). It is written on parchment in Greek minuscule letters, in one columns per page, 13 lines per page. Written in silver.

== History ==
The manuscript was bought by Francesco Accida from Messina in 1583 and presented by him for Cardinal Sirlet. The manuscript was added to the list of New Testament manuscripts by Scholz. It was examined by Scholz and Gregory.

The manuscript is not cited in the critical editions of the Greek New Testament (UBS3).

Currently the codex is located in the Vatican Library (Ottob. gr. 326) in Rome.

== See also ==
- List of New Testament lectionaries
- Biblical manuscript
- Textual criticism

== Bibliography ==
- J. M. A. Scholz, Biblisch-kritische Reise in Frankreich, der Schweiz, Italien, Palästine und im Archipel in den Jahren 1818, 1819, 1820, 1821: Nebst einer Geschichte des Textes des Neuen Testaments.
