= Lectionary 200 =

Lectionary ℓ 200
- New Testament manuscript
- Text: Evangelistarium
- Date: 12th century
- Script: Greek
- Now at: Bodleian Library
- Size: 27 cm by 21 cm

Lectionary 200, designated by siglum ℓ 200 (in the Gregory-Aland numbering), is a Greek parchment manuscript of the New Testament. Palaeographically it has been assigned to the 12th century. Scrivener labelled it by 208^{evl}.

== Description ==
The codex contains lessons from the Gospels of John, Matthew, Luke lectionary (Evangelistarium), on 292 parchment leaves (27 cm by 21 cm). The text is written in Greek minuscule letters, two columns per page, 23 lines per page. It contains musical notes.

There are weekday Gospel lessons.

== History ==
Scrivener and Gregory dated the manuscript to the 12th century. It has been assigned by the Institute for New Testament Textual Research to the 12th century.

The manuscript was added to the list of New Testament manuscripts by Scrivener (number 208) and Gregory (number 200). Gregory saw it in 1883.

The manuscript is not cited in the critical editions of the Greek New Testament (UBS3).

The codex is located in the Bodleian Library (E. D. Clarke 47) at Oxford.

== See also ==
- List of New Testament lectionaries
- Biblical manuscript
- Textual criticism

== Bibliography ==
- Gregory, Caspar René (1900). Textkritik des Neuen Testaments. Vol. 1. Leipzig. p. 403.
