= Lectionary 133 =

Lectionary ℓ 133
- New Testament manuscript
- Text: Evangelistarion, Apostolos
- Date: 14th century
- Script: Greek
- Now at: Vatican Library
- Size: 21.5 cm by 13.4 cm

Lectionary 133, designated by siglum ℓ 133 (in the Gregory-Aland numbering) is a Greek manuscript of the New Testament, on paper leaves. Palaeographically it has been assigned to the 14th century.

== Description ==
The codex contains lessons from the Gospels of John, Matthew, Luke, Acts of the Apostles, and Epistles lectionary (Evangelistarium, Apostolos), on 296 leaves (21.5 cm by 13.4 cm), with some lacunae at the end. It is written on paper, in Greek minuscule letters, in two columns per page, 29 lines per page.

== History ==
The manuscript was added to the list of New Testament manuscripts by Scholz. It was examined by Scholz and Gregory.

The manuscript is not cited in the critical editions of the Greek New Testament (UBS3).

Currently the codex is located in the Vatican Library (Ottob. gr. 416) in Rome.

== See also ==
- List of New Testament lectionaries
- Biblical manuscript
- Textual criticism

== Bibliography ==
- J. M. A. Scholz, Biblisch-kritische Reise in Frankreich, der Schweiz, Italien, Palästine und im Archipel in den Jahren 1818, 1819, 1820, 1821: Nebst einer Geschichte des Textes des Neuen Testaments.
