= Lectionary 197 =

Lectionary ℓ 197
- New Testament manuscript
- Text: Apostolarion
- Date: 15th century
- Script: Greek
- Now at: Bodleian Library
- Size: 21.5 cm by 15.5 cm
- Hand: splendid

Lectionary 197, designated by siglum ℓ 197 (in the Gregory-Aland numbering) is a Greek manuscript of the New Testament, on paper. Palaeographically it has been assigned to the 15th century. Scrivener labelled it by 205^{evl}.

== Description ==
The codex contains three lessons from the Epistles lectionary (Apostolarium). Only 8 leaves (21.5 cm by 15.5 cm) of the codex have survived. The text is written in Greek minuscule letters, on paper, in one column per page, 20 lines per page.

== History ==
Gregory dated the manuscript to the 15th century. Today it is dated by the INTF to the 15th century.

It was added to the list of New Testament manuscripts by Scrivener (number 205). Gregory saw it in 1883.

The manuscript is not cited in the critical editions of the Greek New Testament (UBS3).

Currently the codex is located in the Bodleian Library (Canonici Gr. 126, fol 252–259) at Oxford.

== See also ==
- List of New Testament lectionaries
- Biblical manuscript
- Textual criticism

== Bibliography ==
- Gregory, Caspar René (1900). Textkritik des Neuen Testaments, Vol. 1. Leipzig. p. 403.
