= Lectionary 131 =

Lectionary ℓ 131
- New Testament manuscript
- Text: Evangelistarion
- Date: 11th century
- Script: Greek
- Now at: Vatican Library
- Size: 24.2 cm by 18 cm

Lectionary 131, designated by siglum ℓ 131 (in the Gregory-Aland numbering) is a Greek manuscript of the New Testament, on parchment leaves. Palaeographically it has been assigned to the 11th century.

== Description ==
The codex contains lessons from the Gospels lectionary (Evangelistarium), on 70 parchment leaves (24.2 cm by 18 cm), with large lacunae at the end. It is written in Greek minuscule letters, in one column per page, 12 lines per page. It contains musical notes.

== History ==
The manuscript was added to the list of New Testament manuscripts by Scholz. It was examined by Scholz and Gregory.

The manuscript is not cited in the critical editions of the Greek New Testament (UBS3).

Currently the codex is located in the Vatican Library (Ottob. gr. 175) in Rome.

== See also ==
- List of New Testament lectionaries
- Biblical manuscript
- Textual criticism

== Bibliography ==
- J. M. A. Scholz, Biblisch-kritische Reise in Frankreich, der Schweiz, Italien, Palästine und im Archipel in den Jahren 1818, 1819, 1820, 1821: Nebst einer Geschichte des Textes des Neuen Testaments.
