= Lectionary 155 =

Lectionary ℓ 155
- New Testament manuscript
- Text: Evangelistarion
- Date: 10th century
- Script: Greek
- Now at: Austrian National Library
- Size: 21.5 cm by 16.5 cm

Lectionary 155, designated by siglum ℓ 155 (in the Gregory-Aland numbering) is a Greek manuscript of the New Testament, on parchment leaves. Palaeographically it has been assigned to the 10th century.

== Description ==
The codex contains Lessons from the Gospels of John, Matthew, Luke lectionary (Evangelistarium). The text is written in Greek uncial letters, on 143 parchment leaves (21.5 cm by 16.5 cm), in two columns per page, 27 lines per page. It has music notes. It contains pictures.

The leaves 128-135 are written in minuscule letters.

It is a palimpsest, the upper text contains commentary to Matthew 1:8-25:46. It was added in the 14th century.

== History ==
The manuscript was examined by Scholz and Gregory. Scholz catalogued it twice as the number 155 and 180.

The manuscript is not cited in the critical editions of the Greek New Testament (UBS3).

Currently the codex is located in the Austrian National Library (Theol. gr. 209).

== See also ==
- List of New Testament lectionaries
- Biblical manuscript
- Textual criticism
