= Lectionary 160 =

Lectionary ℓ 160
- New Testament manuscript
- Text: Apostolarion
- Date: 15th century
- Script: Greek
- Now at: Vatican Library
- Size: 20.9 by 15.3 cm (8.2 by 6.0 in)

Lectionary 160, designated by siglum ℓ 160 (in the Gregory-Aland numbering) is a Greek manuscript of the New Testament, on paper leaves. Paleographically it has been assigned to the 15th century. Formerly it was labelled as Lectionary 38^{a}.

== Description ==
The codex contains Lessons from the Acts and Epistles lectionary (Apostolarion). It is written in Greek minuscule letters, on 235 paper leaves (20.9 by 15.3 cm (8.2 by 6.0 in)), in one column per page, 26 lines per page.

== History ==
The manuscript was written by the monk Macarius, known as Eucholius. Franc. Accidas brought the manuscript from the East and presented it to Pope Sixtus V in the year 1585.

The manuscript is not cited in the critical editions of the Greek New Testament (UBS3).

Currently the codex is located in the Vatican Library (Vat. gr. 1528) at Rome.

== See also ==
- List of New Testament lectionaries
- Biblical manuscript
- Textual criticism
