= Lectionary 122 =

Lectionary ℓ 122
- New Testament manuscript
- Text: Evangelistarion
- Date: 1175
- Script: Greek
- Now at: Vatican Library
- Size: 26.7 cm by 19.3 cm

Lectionary 122, designated by siglum ℓ 122 (in the Gregory-Aland numbering) is a Greek manuscript of the New Testament, on parchment leaves. It is dated by a colophon to the year 1175.

== Description ==
The codex contains lessons from the Gospels of John, Matthew, Luke lectionary (Evangelistarium), on 194 parchment leaves (26.7 cm by 19.3 cm). The text is written in Greek minuscule letters, in two columns per page, 24 lines per page. It contains musical notes. It is very splendid manuscript.

== History ==
The manuscript was written by Germanus, a monk, for the monk Theodoret. The manuscript was added to the list of New Testament manuscripts by Scholz.

The manuscript is not cited in the critical editions of the Greek New Testament (UBS3).

Currently the codex is located in the Vatican Library (Vat. gr. 1168) in Rome.

== See also ==
- List of New Testament lectionaries
- Biblical manuscript
- Textual criticism
