= Lectionary 153 =

Lectionary ℓ 153
- New Testament manuscript
- Text: Apostolarion
- Date: 14th century
- Script: Greek
- Now at: National Library of France
- Size: 21.3 by 16.7 cm
- Hand: large and bold

Lectionary 153, designated by siglum ℓ 153 (in the Gregory-Aland numbering) is a Greek manuscript of the New Testament, on parchment leaves. Paleographically it has been assigned to the 14th century.

== Description ==
The codex contains Lessons from the Acts and Epistles from Easter to Pentecost lectionary (Apostolarion) with lacunae at the beginning and end. It is written in Greek minuscule letters, on 118 parchment leaves (21.3 cm by 16.7 cm), with one column and 21-22 lines per page. It was supplied by some cotton paper at the end.

== History ==
The manuscript was examined by Paul Martin and Gregory. Gregory assigned it by 30^{a}.

The manuscript is not cited in the critical editions of the Greek New Testament (UBS3).

Currently the codex is located in the National Library of France (Gr. 373).

== See also ==
- List of New Testament lectionaries
- Biblical manuscript
- Textual criticism
