= Lectionary 121 =

Lectionary ℓ 121
- New Testament manuscript
- Text: Evangelistarion
- Date: 11th century
- Script: Greek
- Now at: Vatican Library
- Size: 36.7 cm by 25.4 cm

Lectionary 121, designated by siglum ℓ 121 (in the Gregory-Aland numbering) is a Greek manuscript of the New Testament, on parchment leaves. Palaeographically it has been assigned to the 11th or 12th century.

== Description ==
The codex contains lessons from the Gospels of John, Matthew, Luke lectionary (Evangelistarium) with some lacunae, on 419 parchment leaves (36.7 cm by 25.4 cm). The text is written in Greek minuscule letters, in one column per page, 22 lines per page. Some material was supplied by a later hand. It is a very splendid manuscript.

== History ==
The manuscript was added to the list of New Testament manuscripts by Scholz.

The manuscript is not cited in the critical editions of the Greek New Testament (UBS3).

Currently the codex is located in the Vatican Library (Vat. gr. 1157) in Rome.

== See also ==
- List of New Testament lectionaries
- Biblical manuscript
- Textual criticism
