= Lectionary 33 =

Lectionary ℓ 33
- New Testament manuscript
- Name: Cod. Cardinalis Alex. Albani
- Text: Evangelistarion
- Date: 11th-century
- Script: Greek
- Size: 24 cm by 19 cm

Lectionary 33, designated by siglum ℓ 33 (in the Gregory-Aland numbering), is a Greek manuscript of the New Testament, on parchment leaves. Palaeographically it has been assigned to the 11th-century.

== Description ==
The codex contains Lessons from the Gospels of John, Matthew, Luke lectionary (Evangelistarium).

The codex was examined by Scholz. A Menologion was edited by Stephanus Ant. Morcelli, Rome 1788.

The codex was held in Rome. It once belonged to Cardinal Alex. Albani.

The manuscript is sporadically cited in the critical editions of the Greek New Testament (UBS3).

== See also ==
- List of New Testament lectionaries
- Biblical manuscript
- Textual criticism

== Bibliography ==
- Gregory, Caspar René (1900). Textkritik des Neuen Testaments. Vol. 1. Leipzig: J.C. Hinrichs. p. 390.
