= Lectionary 149 =

Greek manuscript of the New Testament

Lectionary ℓ 149
- New Testament manuscript
- Text: Apostolos
- Date: 14th century
- Script: Greek
- Now at: French National Library
- Size: 29.1 by 20.3 cm

Lectionary 149, designated by siglum ℓ 149 (in the Gregory-Aland numbering) is a Greek manuscript of the New Testament, on parchment leaves. Paleographically it has been assigned to the 14th century.

== Description ==
The codex contains Lessons from Gospels and Acts of the Apostles lectionary (Apostolos), on 237 parchment leaves (29.1 cm by 20.3 cm), with one lacunae (the leaf between 155 and 156 lost). It is written in Greek minuscule letters, in one column per page, 21 lines per page. It is illegible in parts.

== History ==
The manuscript once belonged to Colbert. The manuscript was examined by Gregory.

The manuscript is not cited in the critical editions of the Greek New Testament (UBS3).

Currently the codex is located in the National Library of France (Gr. 321), at Paris.

== See also ==
- List of New Testament lectionaries
- Biblical manuscript
- Textual criticism
