= Lectionary 164 =

Lectionary ℓ 164
- New Testament manuscript
- Text: Apostolarion
- Date: 1172
- Script: Greek
- Now at: Christ Church, Oxford
- Size: 28.7 by 21.2 cm

Lectionary 164, designated by siglum ℓ 164 (in the Gregory-Aland numbering), is a Greek manuscript of the New Testament on parchment leaves. It is dated by a colophon in the year 1172. Formerly it was labelled as Lectionary 58^{a}.

== Description ==
The codex contains Lessons from the Acts and Epistles lectionary (Apostolarion). It is written in Greek minuscule letters, on 265 parchment leaves (28.7 by 21.2 cm), in two columns per page, 23 lines per page. It contains musical notes and Menologion.

== History ==
The manuscript was written by Nikon for the monastery of the St. Nicolas. It was examined by Scholz.

The manuscript is sporadically cited in the critical editions of the Greek New Testament (UBS3).

Currently the codex is located in the Christ Church (Wake 33) at Oxford.

== See also ==
- List of New Testament lectionaries
- Biblical manuscript
- Textual criticism
