= Lectionary 120 =

Lectionary ℓ 120
- New Testament manuscript
- Text: Evangelistarion
- Date: 11th/12th century
- Script: Greek
- Now at: Vatican Library
- Size: 35.7 cm by 27.3 cm

Lectionary 120, designated by siglum ℓ 120 (in the Gregory-Aland numbering) is a Greek manuscript of the New Testament, on parchment leaves. Palaeographically it has been assigned to the 11th or 12th century.

== Description ==
The codex contains lessons from the Gospels of John, Matthew, Luke lectionary (Evangelistarium), on 344 parchment leaves (35.7 cm by 27.3 cm). It is written in Greek minuscule letters, in 2 columns per page, 20 lines per page. It contains musical notes and many splendidly illuminated pictures.

== History ==
The manuscript was added to the list of New Testament manuscripts by Scholz.

The manuscript is not cited in the critical editions of the Greek New Testament (UBS3).

Currently the codex is located in the Vatican Library (Vat. gr. 1156) in Rome.

== See also ==
- List of New Testament lectionaries
- Biblical manuscript
- Textual criticism
