= Lectionary 157 =

Lectionary ℓ 157
- New Testament manuscript
- Text: Evangelistarion †
- Date: 1253
- Script: Greek
- Now at: Bodleian Library
- Size: 20.5 by 17 cm

Lectionary 157, designated by siglum ℓ 157 (in the Gregory-Aland numbering) is a Greek manuscript of the New Testament, on parchment leaves. It is dated by a Colophon to the year 1253.

== Description ==
The codex contains Lessons from the Gospels of John, Matthew, Luke, and Mark lectionary (Evangelistarium) with some lacunae. The text is written in Greek uncial letters, on 199 parchment leaves (20.5 by 17 cm), in two columns per page, 23 lines per page.

== History ==
The manuscript was a written by Demetrius Brizopoulos. The manuscript was examined by Scholz and Gregory.

The manuscript is not cited in the critical editions of the Greek New Testament (UBS3).

Currently the codex is located in the Bodleian Library (E. D. Clarke 8).

== See also ==
- List of New Testament lectionaries
- Biblical manuscript
- Textual criticism
