= Lectionary 119 =

Greek manuscript of the New Testament

Lectionary ℓ 119
- New Testament manuscript
- Text: Evangelistarion
- Date: 13th century
- Script: Greek
- Now at: Vatican Library
- Size: 35 cm by 27 cm

Lectionary 119, designated by siglum ℓ 119 (in the Gregory-Aland numbering) is a Greek manuscript of the New Testament, on parchment leaves. Palaeographically it has been assigned to the 13th century.

== Description ==
The codex contains lessons from the Gospels of John, Matthew, Luke lectionary (Evangelistarium), on 268 parchment leaves (35 cm by 27 cm). It is written in Greek minuscule letters, in 2 columns per page, 25 lines per page.

== History ==
The manuscript was added to the list of New Testament manuscripts by Scholz.

The manuscript is not cited in the critical editions of the Greek New Testament (UBS3).

Currently the codex is located in the Vatican Library (Vat. gr. 1155) in Rome.

== See also ==
- List of New Testament lectionaries
- Biblical manuscript
- Textual criticism
