= Lectionary 145 =

Lectionary ℓ 145
- New Testament manuscript
- Text: Apostolos
- Date: 12th century
- Script: Greek
- Now at: French National Library
- Size: 34.7 by 27.3 cm

Lectionary 145, designated by sigla ℓ 145 (in the Gregory-Aland numbering), is a Greek manuscript of the New Testament, on parchment leaves. Paleographically it had been assigned to the 12th century.

== Description ==
The codex contains Lessons from Gospels and Acts of the Apostles lectionary (Apostolos), on 187 parchment leaves (33.2 cm by 25.7 cm), with lacunae at the beginning and end. The text is written in Greek minuscule letters, in two columns per page, 28 lines per page.

== History ==
The manuscript was examined by Martin and Gregory.

The manuscript is not cited in the critical editions of the Greek New Testament (UBS3).

Currently the codex is located in the National Library of France (Gr. 306), at Paris.

== See also ==
- List of New Testament lectionaries
- Biblical manuscript
- Textual criticism
