= Lectionary 148 =

Lectionary ℓ 148
- New Testament manuscript
- Text: Apostolos
- Date: 12th century
- Script: Greek
- Now at: French National Library
- Size: 23.2 by 19.5 cm

Lectionary 148, designated by siglum ℓ 148 (in the Gregory-Aland numbering) is a Greek manuscript of the New Testament, on parchment leaves. Paleographically it has been assigned to the 12th-century.

== Description ==
The codex contains Lessons from Gospels and Acts of the Apostles lectionary (Apostolos), on 208 parchment leaves (23.2 cm by 19.5 cm), with some lacunae. It is written in Greek minuscule letters, in two columns per page, 21 lines per page. It has music notes.

== History ==
The manuscript was examined by Martin and Gregory.

The manuscript is not cited in the critical editions of the Greek New Testament (UBS3).

Currently the codex is located in the National Library of France (Gr. 320), at Paris.

== See also ==
- List of New Testament lectionaries
- Biblical manuscript
- Textual criticism
