= Textual variants in the Acts of the Apostles =

Textual variants in the Acts of the Apostles are the subject of the study called textual criticism of the New Testament. Textual variants in manuscripts arise when a copyist makes deliberate or inadvertent alterations to a text that is being reproduced. An abbreviated list of textual variants in this particular book is given in this article below.

Most of the variations are not significant and some common alterations include the deletion, rearrangement, repetition, or replacement of one or more words when the copyist's eye returns to a similar word in the wrong location of the original text. If their eye skips to an earlier word, they may create a repetition (error of dittography). If their eye skips to a later word, they may create an omission. They may resort to performing a rearranging of words to retain the overall meaning without compromising the context. In other instances, the copyist may add text from memory from a similar or parallel text in another location. Otherwise, they may also replace some text of the original with an alternative reading. Spellings occasionally change. Synonyms may be substituted. A pronoun may be changed into a proper noun (such as "he said" becoming "Jesus said"). John Mill's 1707 Greek New Testament was estimated to contain some 30,000 variants in its accompanying textual apparatus which was based on "nearly 100 [Greek] manuscripts." Peter J. Gurry puts the number of non-spelling variants among New Testament manuscripts around 500,000, though he acknowledges his estimate is higher than all previous ones.

== Legend ==
A guide to the sigla (symbols and abbreviations) most frequently used in the body of this article.

General sigla
# beginning with 0: uncial
# not beginning with 0: minuscule
^{*} superscript: original reading
^{c} superscript: scribal correction
^{ms} superscript: individual manuscript
^{mss} superscript: multiple manuscripts
^{pt} superscript: partial attestation
^{vid} superscript: uncertain reading
arab: Arabic versions
arm: Armenian versions
𝔐 or Byz: Byzantine text-type
cop: Coptic versions

sa: Sahidic version
bo: Boharic version

eth: Ethiopic versions
ƒ: Greek manuscripts family
geo: Georgian versions
goth: Gothic versions
it: Italic/Vetus Latina
lat: most Italic and Vulgate
latt: all Italic and Vulgate
𝔓: papyrus
𝑙: individually numbered lectionary
Lect: most or all numbered lectionaries
parenthesized (): approximate reading
rell: all other extant manuscripts
slav: Slavic versions
syr: Syriac versions
vg: Latin Vulgate
ς: Textus Receptus

Uncial sigla
א: Codex Sinaiticus (01)
A: Codex Alexandrinus (02)
B: Codex Vaticanus (03)
C: Codex Ephraemi Rescriptus (04)
D^{ea}: Codex Bezae (05)
D^{p}: Codex Claromontanus (06)
K^{e}: Codex Cyprius (017)
K^{ap}: Codex Mosquensis I (018)
L^{e}: Codex Regius (New Testament) (019)
L^{ap}: Codex Angelicus (020)
P^{apr}: Codex Porphyrianus (025)
S: Codex Vaticanus 354 (028)
V: Codex Mosquensis II (031)
W: Codex Washingtonianus (032)
Z: Codex Dublinensis (035)
Γ: Codex Tischendorfianus IV (036)
Δ: Codex Sangallensis 48 (037)
Θ: Codex Koridethi (038)
Ξ: Codex Zacynthius (040)
Π: Codex Petropolitanus (New Testament) (041)
Φ: Codex Beratinus (043)
Ψ: Codex Athous Lavrensis (044)
Ω: Codex Athous Dionysiou (045)
ff^{1}: Codex Corbeiensis I
ff^{2}: Codex Corbeiensis II
g^{1}: Codex Sangermanensis I
k: Codex Bobiensis

Critical editions
T8th: Tischendorf's 8th Edition of Editio Octava Critica Maior
WH: Westcott and Hort (1881)
NA: Novum Testamentum Graece (Nestle–Aland)
UBS: United Bible Societies
ECM: Editio Critica Maior

== Textual variants ==
Textual variants in the Acts of the Apostles

9 Textual variants in Acts 1

Acts 1:5

ἐν πνεύματι βαπτισθήσεσθε ἁγίῳ (with [the] Spirit will be baptised Holy) – א* B 81 915 Didymus WH
ἐν πνεύματι ἁγίῳ βαπτισθήσεσθε (with [the] Spirit Holy will be baptised) – D it Hilary Augustine
βαπτισθήσεσθε ἐν πνεύματι ἁγίῳ (will be baptised with [the] Spirit Holy) – 𝔓^{74} א^{c} A C E Ψ Byz vg Origen Cyril ς. Compare Matthew 3:11; Mark 1:8; Luke 3:16.

Acts 1:5

ἡμέρας (days) – Byz ς WH
ἡμέρας ἔως τῆς πεντηκοστῆς (days until the Pentecost) – D, cop^{sa} cop^{mae} Ephraem Augustine Cassiodorus

Acts 1:6

ἠρώτων αὐτὸν (asking [of] him) – WH
ἐπηρώτων αὐτὸν (inquiring him) – Byz ς

Acts 1:7

εἶπεν πρὸς αὐτούς ([he] said to them) – B* syr^{p} WH. Alexandrian text-type: Westcott and Hort 1881, Westcott and Hort / [NA27 and UBS4 variants] 1864–94, Tischendorf 8th Edition, Nestle 1904
εἶπεν δὲ πρὸς αὐτούς (but [he] said to them) – א A B^{2} Ψ Byz vg syr^{h} ς. Byz: Stephanus Textus Receptus 1550, Scrivener's Textus Receptus 1894, RP Byzantine Majority Text 2005, Greek Orthodox Church
καὶ εἶπεν πρὸς αὐτούς (and [he] said to them) – Western text-type: D it
ὁ δὲ ἀποκριθεὶς εἶπεν αὐτοῖς (but he, answering them, said) – (C^{vid}) E

Acts 1:10

ἐσθήσεσι λευκαῖς (white clothing) – 𝔓^{56}^{(c)} א A B C Ψ 81 323 945 1175 1739 pc it vg Eusebius WH
ἐσθήτι λευκῇ (white clothing) – 𝔓^{56}* D E Byz it^{gig} syr ς

Acts 1:11

εἰς τὸν οὐρανόν ((in)to [the] heaven) – א A B C E Ψ 049 056 0142 36 81 88 104 181 307 326^{mg} 330 436 453 610 614 629 630 945 1175 1241 1409 1505 1678 1739^{supp} 1877 1891 2127 2344 2412 2492 Byz Lect it^{ar} it^{c} it^{dem} it^{e} it^{p} it^{ph} it^{ro} it^{t} it^{w} vg syr^{p} syr^{h} syr^{pal} cop^{sa} cop^{bo} cop^{mae} arm^{mss} eth geo slav Origen^{lat} Eusebius Ps-Ignatius Epiphanius Chrysostom Jerome Augustine^{2/6} Cyril Proclus Quodvultdeus^{1/2} Theodoret^{3/4} Cosmas ς WH
omitted – D, 33^{c}, 242, 326* 2495 l^{60} it^{d} it^{gig} vg^{mss} cop^{bo(mss)} arm^{mss} Maximus Maximinus Augustine^{4/6} Quodvultdeus^{1/2} Leo Varimadum Theodoret^{1/4} Vigilius Cassiodorus

Acts 1:14

τῇ προσευχῇ ([in] the prayer) – 𝔓^{74} א A B C* D E Ψ 81 104 1175 pc it vg syr WH NR CEI Riv TILC Nv NM
τῇ προσευχῇ καὶ τῇ δεήσει ([in] the prayer and [in] the supplication) – C Byz ς ND Dio. Compare Philippians 4:6.

Acts 1:15

ἀδελφῶν (of the brothers) – א A B C* 33^{vid} 104 945 1175 pc vg cop^{sa} cop^{bo} WH NR CEI Riv TILC Nv NM
μαθητῶν (of the disciples) – (C) D E Ψ it^{e} it^{gig} it^{p} syr cop^{mae} Byz Cyprian Augustine ς ND Dio.
ἀποστόλων (of the apostles) – 𝔓^{74}

Acts 1:18

πρηνὴς γενόμενος (headlong having fallen/become) – א A B C D E Ψ 049 056 0142 33 81 88 104 181 326 330 436 451 614 629 630 945 1241 1505 1739^{supp} 1877 2127 2412 2492 2495 Byz (syr^{p}) syr^{h} cop^{sa} cop^{bo} ς WH
πρησθείς (swollen up) – geo^{?} Papias
pronus factus ([having been] made/become face down) – it^{d} it^{e} it^{p*}
in faciem prostratus (lying down on the face) – it^{gig} Ambrose
suspensus (hanging/suspended) – it^{ar} it^{c} it^{p(c)} it^{t} vg Bede
(swollen) – arm

2 Textual variants in Acts 2

Acts 2:5

κατοικοῦντες Ἰουδαῖοι, ἄνδρες εὐλαβεῖς – A, B
κατοικοῦντες εν Ἰερουσαλὴμ, ἄνδρες Ἰουδαῖοι – C^{3} (Ἰουδαῖοι ἄνδρες), D (εὐλαβεῖς ἄνδρες), E^{a} (Ἰουδαῖοι κατοικοῦντες), Ψ, 049, 056, 0142, 33, 81, 88, 104, 181, 326, 330, 436, 451, 614, 629, 630, 945, 1241, 1505, 1739, 1877, 2127, 2412, 2492, 2495, Byz, Lect
κατοικοῦντες ἄνδρες εὐλαβεῖς – א, it^{ph}, syr^{p}
κατοικοῦντες Ιουδαιοι – ℓ 603

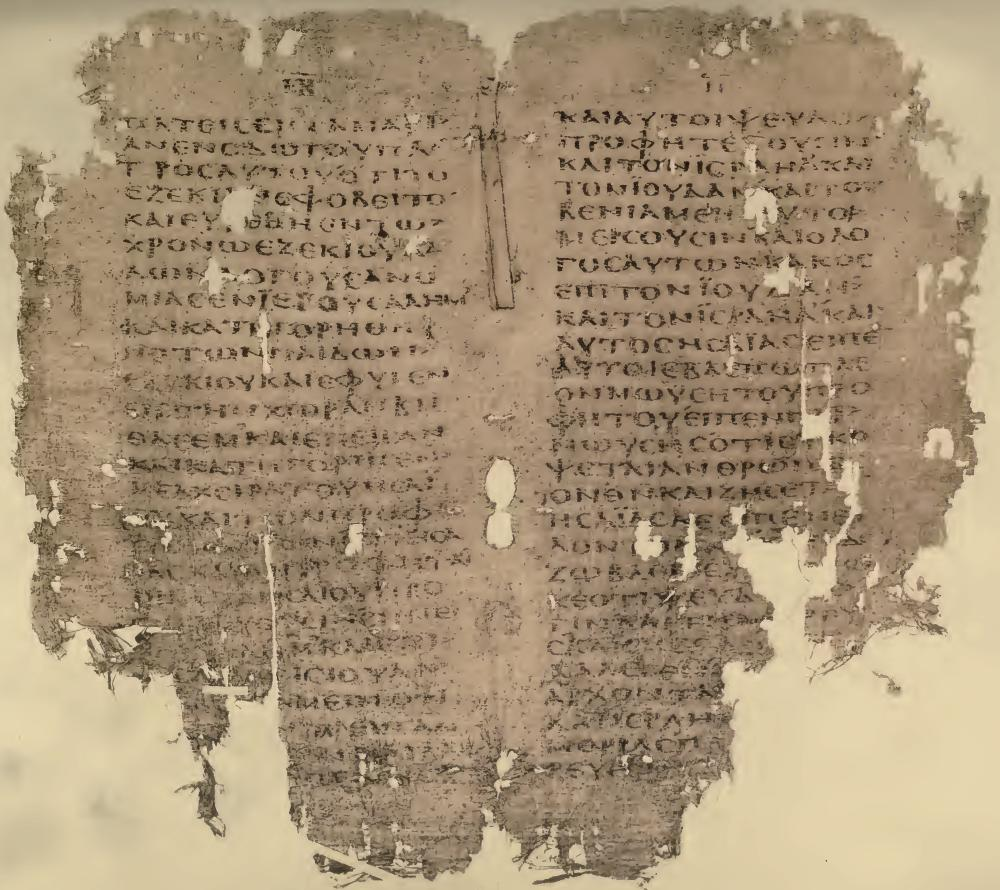
Acts 2:11-22 from Uncial 076

Acts 2:14

ενδεκα – majority
δεκα αποστολος – D*

0 Textual variants in Acts 3

Acts 3:1

2 Textual variants in Acts 4

Acts 4:24

συ – 𝔓^{74}, א, A, B, 2495
συ ει – vg^{cl}
συ ο θεος – D E P Ψ 049 056 0142 104 326 330 436 451 614 629 945 1241 1505 1739 2412 2492 Byz Lect e gig
συ ει ο θεος – 2127, ℓ 680, ℓ 1443, d, cop^{sa}
κυριε ο θεος – 33, 181, 1877, syr^{p, h}
κυριε συ – 88 (arm συ κυριος)
κυριε – ar

Acts 4:36

Ἰωσὴφ (Joseph) – Westcott and Hort 1881, Westcott and Hort / [NA27 and UBS4 variants], Tischendorf's 8th Edition 1864–94, Nestle 1904
Ἰωσῆς (Joses) – Stephanus Textus Receptus 1550, Scrivener's Textus Receptus 1894, RP Byzantine Majority Text 2005, Greek Orthodox Church

2 Textual variants in Acts 5

Acts 5:3

ὁ Πέτρος Ἁνανία – majority of manuscripts of all the Alexandrian, Caesarean, and Byzantine text-types
Πέτρος πρὸς Ἁνανίαν – D, Ψ
πρὸς αὐτόν ὁ Πέτρος Ἁνανίαν – E, 321

Acts 5:28

ου παραγγελια – א^{c}, D^{gr}, E, P, (Ψ ουχι), 049, 056, 0142, 88, 104, 181, 326, 330, 436, 451, 614, 629, 630, 945, 1241, 1505, 1739, 1877, 2127, 2412, 2492, 2495, Byz, Lect, e, h, p, syr^{p, h}, cop^{sa}, arm, eth
παραγγελια – 𝔓^{74}, א*, A, B, ℓ 147, ar, d, gig, vg, cop^{sa}

0 Textual variants in Acts 6

Acts 6:1

0 Textual variants in Acts 7

Acts 7:1

2 Textual variants in Acts 8

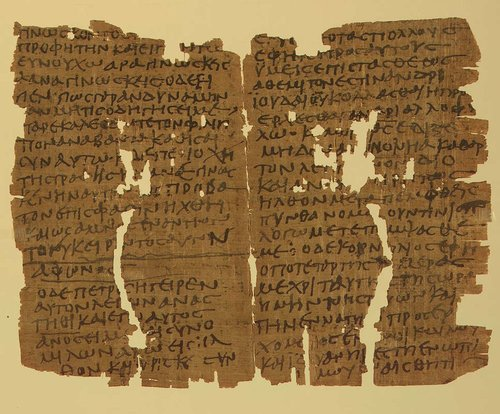
Act 8:26-32 from 𝔓^{50}

Acts 8:37

εἶπε δὲ ὁ Φίλιππος, εἰ πιστεύεις ἐξ ὅλης τῆς καρδίας, ἔξεστιν ἀποκριθεὶς δὲ ειπε, πιστεύω τὸν υἱὸν του θεου ειναι τὸν Ιησουν Χριστον – 104, 323, 453, 945, 1739, 1891, 2818, ℓ 59
εἶπε δὲ αὐτῷ ὁ Φίλιππος, ἐὰν πιστεύεις ἐξ ὅλης τῆς καρδίας σου, σωθήσει ἀποκριθεὶς δὲ ειπε, πιστεύω εἰς τὸν Χριστὸν τὸν υἱὸν του θεου – Ε^{a}, it^{e}
εἶπε δὲ, εἰ πιστεύεις ἐξ ὅλης τῆς καρδίας, ἔξεστιν ἀποκριθεὶς δὲ ὁ εὐνοῦχος ειπεν αὐτῷ, πιστεύω τὸν υἱὸν του θεου ειναι τὸν Ιησουν Χριστον – 88
verse omitted by 𝔓^{45}, 𝔓^{74}, א, A, B, C, P, Ψ, 049, 056, 0142, 33, 81, 88*, 104, 181, 326, 330, 436, 451, 614, 1241, 1505, 2127, 2412, 2492, 2495, Byz, Lect

Acts 8:39

πνεῦμα ἅγιον ἐπέπεσεν ἐπὶ τὸν εὐνοῦχον, ἄγγελος δέ κύριου ἥρπασεν τὸν Φίλιππον (the Holy Spirit fell on the eunuch, and an angel of the Lord caught up Philip) – A, 36^{a}, 94, 103, 307, 322, 323, 385, 453, 467, 945, 1739, 1765, 1891, 2298, it^{p}, vg, syr^{h}

0 Textual variants in Acts 9

Acts 9:1

1 Textual variants in Acts 10

Acts 10:25

Codex Bezae has an addition: "And as Peter was drawing near to Caesarea one of the servants ran forward and announced that he was come."

1 Textual variants in Acts 11

Acts 11:20

Ελληνιστας – B D^{b} E P Ψ 049 056 0142 81 88 104 181 326 330 436 451 614 629 630 945 1241 1505 1739 1877 2127 2412 2492 2495 Byz Lect
Ελληνας – 𝔓^{74} Sinaiticus^{c}, A D arm
ευαγγελιστας – Sinaiticus

1 Textual variants in Acts 12

Acts 12:25

εις Ιερουσαλημ (to Jerusalem) – א, B, H, L, P, 049, 056, 0142, 81, 88, 326, 330, 451, 629, 1241, 1505, 1877, 2492, 2495, Byz, Lect
εξ Ιερουσαλημ (from Jerusalem) – 𝔓^{74}, A, 33, 69, 630, 2127
απο Ιερουσαλημ (from Jerusalem) – D, Ψ, 181, 436, 614, 2412, ℓ 147, ℓ 809, ℓ 1021, ℓ 1141, ℓ 1364, ℓ 1439, ar, d, gig, vg, Chrysostom
εις Αντιοχειαν (to Antioch) – 97^{mg}, 110, 328, 424^{mg}, 425^{c}
εις την Αντιοχειαν (to Antioch) – ℓ 38
απο Ιερουσαλημ εις Αντιοχειαν (from Jerusalem to Antioch) – E, 322, 323
εξ Ιερουσαλημ εις Αντιοχειαν (from Jerusalem to Antioch) – 429, 945, 1739, e, p, syr^{p}, cop^{sa} geo
εις Ιερουσαλημ εις Αντιοχειαν (to Jerusalem to Antioch) – 104, cop^{sa} (some mss.)

1 Textual variants in Acts 13

Acts 13:33

εν τω ψαλμω γεγραπται τω δευτερω (it is written in the second Psalm) – 𝔓^{75}, א, A, B, C, Ψ, 33 81 181 326 630 945 1739
εν τω ψαλμω τω δευτερω γεγραπται (it is written in the second Psalm) – Ε Π 049 88 104 330 436 451 614 629 1241 1505 1877 2127 2412 2492 2495 Byz
εν τω δευτερω ψαλμω γεγραπται (it is written in the second Psalm) – 056 0142
εν τω πρωτω ψαλμω γεγραπται (it is written in the first Psalm) – D* it
εν τοις ψαλμοις γεγραπται (it is written in Psalms) – 𝔓^{45}
εν τω ψαλμω γεγραπται (it is written in Psalm) – 522 1175

0 Textual variants in Acts 14

Acts 14:1

3 Textual variants in Acts 15

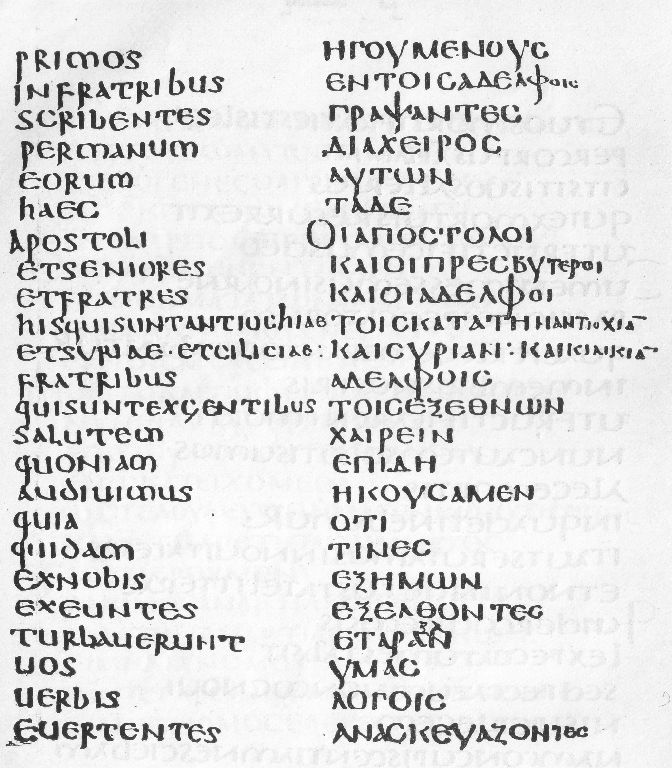
Acts 15:22–24 from the Codex Laudianus, written in parallel columns of Latin and Greek.

Acts 15:23

γραψαντης δια χειρος αυτων – 𝔓^{45}, 𝔓^{74}, א*, A, B, cop^{bo}
γραψαντης δια χειρος αυτων ταδε – א^{c}, E, (33), Byz, syr^{h}
γραψαντης δια χειρος αυτων επιστολην περιεχουσαν ταδε – C, ar, c, gig, w, geo
γραψαντης επιστολην δια χειρος αυτων περιεχουσαν ταδε – D, d
γραψαντης επιστολην δια χειρος αυτων εχουσαν τον τυπον τουτον – Ψ
γραψαντης δια χειρος αυτων επιστολην και πεμψαντες περιεχουσαν ταδε – 614.

Acts 15:24

ψυχας υμων (your souls) – 𝔓^{33}, 𝔓^{45}, 𝔓^{74}, א, A, B, D, 33, 81, 629
ψυχας υμων λεγοντες περιτεμνεσθαι και τηρειν τον νομον (your souls, saying: you must be circumcised and keep the law) – C, E^{a} (περιτεμνεσθαι δει), P, Ψ, 049, 056, 0142, 88, 104, 181, 326, 330, 436, 451, 614, 630, 945, 1241, 1739, Byz

Acts 15:34

verse omitted by majority of the mss.
verse contained in C, 33, 88, 181, 326, 436, 614, 630, 945, 1739, 2412

0 Textual variants in Acts 16

Acts 16:1

1 Textual variants in Acts 17

Acts 17:26

εξ ενος – 𝔓^{74}, א, A, B, 33, 81, 181, 629, 630, 1739, vg, cop^{sa, bo}
εξ ενος αιματος – D, E, P, 049, 056, 0142, 88, 104, 326, 330, 436, 451, 614, 945, 1241, 1505, 1877, 2127, 2412, 2492, 2495, Byz Lect
εξ ενος στοματος – Ψ, ℓ 603
omitted by eth^{ro}

1 Textual variants in Acts 18

Acts 18:26

την οδον – D d gig
την οδον του θεου – 𝔓^{74} א A B 33 88 181 326 436 614 2412 ℓ 60 ℓ 1356
την οδον του κυριου – E 1505 2495 ℓ 598
τον λογον του κυριου – 945 1739
τον λογον του θεου – 630
την του θεου οδον – P Ψ 049 0142 104 330 451 1241 1877 2127 2492 Byz Lect

1 Textual variants in Acts 19

Acts 19:20

του κυριου ο λογος – א A B
ο λογος του κυριου – majority
η πιστις του κυριου – D, syr^{p}

2 Textual variants in Acts 20

Acts 20:15

και μειναντες εν Τρωγυλλιω (and after remaining at Trogyllium) – D P 049 88 181 326 330 451 614 945 1241 1505 1877 2127 2412 2492 2495
και μειναντες εν Στρογγυλιω (and after remaining at Strogyllium) – 056 0142
και μειναντες εν Στογυλιω (and after remaining at Stogyllium) – 104
μεινοντες εις το Γυλλιον (Gyllium) – Ψ
omit – 𝔓^{74} א A B C E^{gr} 33 630 1739

Acts 20:28

εκκλησιαν του Θεου (church of God) – א B 614 1175 2495 al vg sy bo^{ms}
εκκλησιαν του κυριου (church of the Lord) – 𝔓^{74}, A, C*, D, E, Ψ, 33, 453, 945, 1739, 1891, 36^{a}
εκκλησιαν του κυριου και του Θεου (church of the Lord and God) – C^{3}, Byz

1 Textual variants in Acts 21

Acts 21:1

Παταρα – א B E P Ψ 049 056 0142 33 88 104 181 326 330 436 451 614 629 630 945 1241 1505 1739 1877 2127 2412 2492 2495 Byz ar e vg syr^{p, h} cop^{bo} arm eth
Πατερα – 𝔓^{74} A C
Παταρα και Μυρα – 𝔓^{41} D^{gr} gig (it^{ph} Hyram) vg^{mss} cop^{sa}

0 Textual variants in Acts 22

Acts 22:1

2 Textual variants in Acts 23

Acts 23:1

2 Textual variants in Acts 24

Acts 24:6b-8a

verse omitted by majority of the mss.
verse contained (with textual differences) in E, Ψ, 056, 0142, 33, 88, 181, 424, 436, 483, 614, 630, 945, 1505, 2412, 2495

Acts 24:20

ευρον αδικημα – 𝔓^{74} א A B 33 81 181
ευρον εν εμοι αδικημα – C E P Ψ 049 056 0142 88 104 326 330 436 451 614 629 Byz

0 Textual variants in Acts 25

Acts 25:1

0 Textual variants in Acts 26

Acts 26:1

3 Textual variants in Acts 27

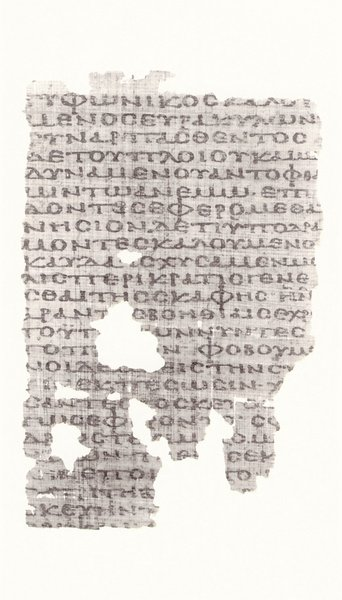
𝔓^{74} with text Acts 27:14-21

Acts 27:16

Καυδα (name of island) – 𝔓^{74} B 1175 lat syr^{p}
Κλαυδα – א A 33 81 614 945 1739 2495, vg^{mss} (Codex Cavensis) syr^{h}
Κλαυδην – Byz
Γαυδην – Ψ

Acts 27:37

ως εβδομηκοντα (about seventy) – Epiphanius^{pt}
ως εβδομηκοντα εξ (about seventy-six) – B sa Epiphanius^{pt}
εβδομηκοντα εξ (seventy-six) – 522 ℓ^{680}
εκατον εβδομηκοντα εξ (one hundred seventy-six) – bo^{mss}
διακοσιοι δεκα εξ (two hundred sixteen) – ℓ^{1156}
διακοσιαι εβδομηκοντα (two hundred seventy) – 69 Ephraem
διακοσιαι εβδομηκοντα πεντε (two hundred seventy-five) – A sa
διακοσιαι εβδομηκοντα εξ (two hundred seventy-six) – rell

Acts 27:41

απο της βιας (from the force) – א*
υπο της βιας (by the force) – A B arm geo
a vi maris (from the sea) – latt
των κυματων (of the waves) – ℓ^{1441} (w/obeli)
υπο των κυματων (by the waves) – Ψ 1678 2464 eth
υπο της βιας των ανεμων (by the force of the winds) – 629
απο της βιας των κυματων (from the force of the waves) – 104 ℓ^{599}
υπο της βιας των κυματων (by the force of the waves) – 𝔓^{74} א^{2} rell

0 Textual variants in Acts 28

Acts 28:1

== See also ==
- Alexandrian text-type
- Biblical inerrancy
- Byzantine text-type
- Caesarean text-type
- Categories of New Testament manuscripts
- Comparison of codices Sinaiticus and Vaticanus
- List of New Testament verses not included in modern English translations
- Textual variants in the New Testament
- Western text-type
