= Minuscule 467 =

- New Testament manuscript
- Text: New Testament (except Gospels)
- Date: 15th century
- Script: Greek
- Now at: Bibliothèque nationale de France
- Size: 28 cm by 18.2 cm
- Type: mixed / Byzantine
- Category: III/V

Minuscule 467 (in the Gregory-Aland numbering), α 502 (in the Soden numbering), is a Greek minuscule manuscript of the New Testament, on paper. Palaeographically it has been assigned to the 15th century. The manuscript has complex contents. Formerly it was labelled by 116^{a}, 136^{p}, and 53^{r}.

== Description ==
The codex contains the text of the whole New Testaments except Gospels on 331 paper leaves (size 28 cm by 18.2 cm). The text is written in one column per page, 21 lines per page.

It contains prolegomena, lists of the κεφαλαια (tables of contents) before each book, numbers of the κεφαλαια (chapters) at the margin (in Latin), lectionary markings at the margin (for liturgical reading), subscriptions to the Pauline epistles, numbers of στιχοι to the Pauline epistles, and αναγνωσεις to the Romans-Colossians. It has scholia to the Catholic epistles.

The order of books: Acts of the Apostles, Catholic epistles, Pauline epistles, and Book of Revelation.

== Text ==
The Greek text of the codex is mixed with strong the Byzantine element. Aland placed it in Category III in Pauline epistles. In rest of books it has lower value.

In Acts 8:39 instead of πνεῦμα κυρίου (spirit of the Lord) it has unusual textual variant πνεῦμα ἅγιον ἐπέπεσεν ἐπὶ τὸν εὐνοῦχον, ἄγγελος δέ κυρίου ἥρπασεν τὸν Φίλιππον (the Holy Spirit fell on the eunuch, and an angel of the Lord caught up Philip) supported by Codex Alexandrinus and several minuscule manuscripts: 94, 103, 307, 322, 323, 385, 453, 945, 1739, 1765, 1891, 2298, 36^{a}, it^{p}, vg, syr^{h}.

== History ==
The manuscript was written by George Hermonymus. Probably it was held in Claromontanus (?) It once belonged to Le Teller, bishop of Rheims, as first manuscript of his collection (in the 16th century).

The manuscript was slightly examined and described by Scholz, Paulin Martin, and C. R. Gregory (1885). Herman C. Hoskier examined and collated its text in the Book of Revelation.

It was added to the list of New Testament manuscripts by Scholz. Formerly it was labelled by 116^{a}, 136^{p}, and 53^{r}. In 1908 Gregory gave the number 467 to it.

It is currently housed at the Bibliothèque nationale de France (Gr. 59) in Paris.

== See also ==
- List of New Testament minuscules
- Biblical manuscript
- Textual criticism
