= Minuscule 385 =

- New Testament manuscript
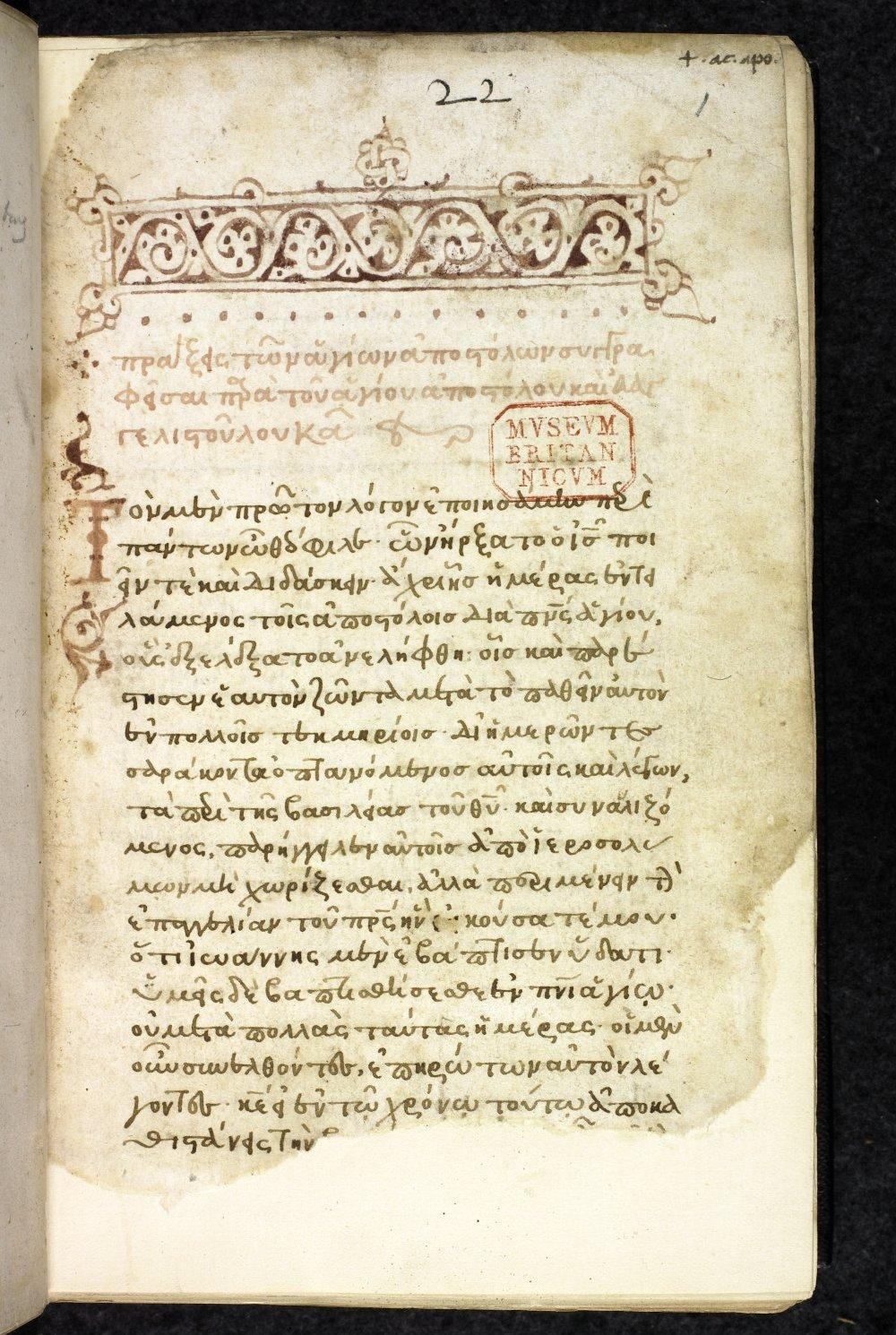
- The first page of the Book of Acts; decorated initial 'T'
- Text: New Testament (except Gospels) †
- Date: 1407
- Script: Greek
- Now at: British Library
- Size: 21.8 cm by 14.5 cm
- Type: Byzantine text-type
- Category: V

Minuscule 385 (in the Gregory-Aland numbering), α 506 (Soden), is a Greek minuscule manuscript of the New Testament, on paper. Dated by a colophon to the year 1407 (May). The manuscript has no complex context. Formerly it was designated by 60^{a}, 63^{p}, and 29^{r}.

== Description ==
The codex contains the text of the Acts, Pauline epistles, Catholic epistles, and Book of Revelation on 267 paper leaves (21.8 cm by 14.5 cm) with some lacunae (James 1:1-11; Rev 22:2-18.20.21). The text is written in one column per page, in 26 lines per page. The initials and titles in red.

It contains Prolegomena to the Pauline epistles, prolegomena to the Catholic epistles, subscriptions at the end of each book, and numbers of stichoi.

It contains non-biblical matter De proditione Judae homilia of John Chrysostom (folios 225-237v).

== Text ==
The Greek text of the codex is a representative of the Byzantine text-type. Aland placed it in Category V. In Book of Acts some the Western readings.

In Acts 8:39 instead of πνεῦμα κυρίου (spirit of the Lord) it has unusual textual variant πνεῦμα ἅγιον ἐπέπεσεν ἐπὶ τὸν εὐνοῦχον, ἄγγελος δέ κυρίου ἥρπασεν τὸν Φίλιππον (the Holy Spirit fell on the eunuch, and an angel of the Lord caught up Philip) supported by Codex Alexandrinus and several minuscule manuscripts: 94, 103, 307, 322, 323, 453, 467, 945, 1739, 1765, 1891, 2298, 36^{a}, it^{p}, vg, syr^{h}.

== History ==
The manuscript was written by Georgios Baiophoros, a scribe, in 1407. It was bound later with Uncial 0121a; the first folio from 0121a was folded in half and used as flyleaves at the front and end of minuscule 385.

The manuscript was examined by Griesbach (Acts 1-8, 1 Peter, 1 John 5, Romans, 1 Cor, 2 Cor 3, Ephesians, Rev) and Scholz. C. R. Gregory saw it in 1883.

The manuscript was added to the list of the New Testament manuscripts by Scholz (1794-1852).

Formerly it was designated by 60^{a}, 63^{p}, and 29^{r}. In 1908 Gregory gave the number 385 to it.

The manuscript is currently housed at the British Library (Harley MS 5613).

== See also ==
- List of New Testament minuscules
- Biblical manuscript
- Textual criticism
