= Minuscule 103 =

Greek minuscule manuscript of the New Testament

- New Testament manuscript
- Text: Acts, Pauline epistles
- Date: 12th century
- Script: Greek
- Now at: State Historical Museum
- Size: 24 cm by 20 cm
- Type: Byzantine text-type
- Category: V

Minuscule 103 (in the Gregory-Aland numbering), ΟΘ^{28} (Soden), is a Greek minuscule manuscript of the New Testament, on parchment leaves. Palaeographically it has been assigned to the 12th century. The manuscript has complex contents.

Formerly it was labelled by 100^{a} and 115^{p}.

== Description ==
The codex contains a complete text of the Acts, Catholic epistles, and Pauline epistles on 333 parchment leaves (size 24 cm by 20 cm) with a catena.

It contains prolegomena, tables of the κεφαλαια (tables of contents) before each book, and scholia. Synaxarion and αναγνωσεις (lessons) were added by a later hand (together 386 leaves).

The order of books is Acts of the Apostles, the Catholic epistles, and then the Pauline epistles. The order of the Pauline epistles is unusual: Romans, Hebrews, Colossians, 1-2 Thessalonians, Philippians, 1-2 Timothy, Titus, Philemon, Ephesians, Galatians, and 1-2 Corinthians.

== Text ==
The Greek text of the codex is a representative of the Byzantine text-type. According to Kurt Aland in Acts it supports 65 times the Byzantine text against the original, 6 times the original against the Byzantine, 25 times agrees with both. It has 9 independent or distinctive readings. Aland placed it in Category V.

In Acts 8:39 instead of πνεῦμα κυρίου (spirit of the Lord) it has unusual textual variant πνεῦμα ἅγιον ἐπέπεσεν ἐπὶ τὸν εὐνοῦχον, ἄγγελος δέ κυρίου ἥρπασεν τὸν Φίλιππον (the Holy Spirit fell on the eunuch, and an angel of the Lord caught up Philip) supported by Codex Alexandrinus and several minuscule manuscripts: 94, 307, 322, 323, 385, 453, 467, 945, 1739, 1765, 1891, 2298, 36^{a}, it^{p}, vg, syr^{h}.

== History ==
The manuscript was examined by Matthaei.

Formerly it was labelled by 100^{a} and 115^{p}. Gregory in 1908 gave for it number 103.

It is currently housed at the State Historical Museum (V. 96, S. 347), at Moscow.

== See also ==
- List of New Testament minuscules
- Biblical manuscript
- Textual criticism
