= P56 =

P56 may refer to:

- HMS Usurper (P56), a submarine of the Royal Navy
- INS Sujata (P56), a patrol vessel of Indian Navy
- Northrop XP-56 Black Bullet, an American prototype fighter aircraft
- Papyrus 56, a biblical manuscript
- Percival P.56 Provost, a British trainer aircraft
- P56, a state regional road in Latvia
- Prohibited Area 56, the prohibited airspace around the White House, U.S. Capitol and Naval Observatory in Washington D.C.
