= L59 =

L59 may refer to:

- Aero L-59 Super Albatros, a Czechoslovak military trainer aircraft
- Albatros L 59, a single-seat German utility aircraft of the 1920s
- Lectionary 59, designated ℓ 59, a Greek manuscript of the New Testament
- Zeppelin LZ104, designated L.59, a German dirigible during World War I
