= Minuscule 94 =

- New Testament manuscript
- Text: Acts of the Apostles, Pauline epistles, Book of Revelation
- Date: 12th/13th century
- Script: Greek
- Now at: Bibliothèque nationale de France
- Size: 24.4 cm by 18 cm
- Type: mixed / Byzantine text-type / Alexandrian
- Category: III/V
- Note: Commentary

Minuscule 94 (in the Gregory-Aland numbering), O^{31} (von Soden), is a Greek minuscule manuscript of the New Testament, on parchment and paper, dated to the 12th or 13th century. Formerly it was labelled by 18^{a}, 21^{p}, and 19^{r}.

== Description ==
The codex contains the text of the Acts of the Apostles, Pauline epistles, Book of Revelation on 328 parchment and paper leaves (size 24.4 cm by 18 cm) with some lacunae. The order of books is usual: Acts, Catholic epistles, Pauline epistles (Hebrews are placed before 1 Timothy), and Revelation of John. The leaves 1-26 are written on vellum, the rest on cotton paper (leaves 27-328).

The text is written in one column per page, 22 lines per page (38 lines with text of Commentary). It contains scholia to the Acts and Catholic epistles, Andreas's Commentary to the Apocalypse, and Prolegomena to the Pauline epistles. The initial letters are written in red.

The Book of Revelation palaeographically had been assigned to the 12th century, and rest part of the codex to the 13th century. According to the colophon, the Book of Revelation was written by a monk named Anthony, dates it to the year 1079.

== Text ==
The Greek text of the codex is a representative of the Byzantine text-type. Aland placed it in Category III for the Acts and Catholic Epistles, "but clearly lower for Paul and Revelation. According to David Alan Black it represents the Alexandrian text-type in the Book of Revelation.

In Acts 8:39 instead of πνεῦμα κυρίου (spirit of the Lord) it has unusual textual variant πνεῦμα ἅγιον ἐπέπεσεν ἐπὶ τὸν εὐνοῦχον, ἄγγελος δέ κυρίου ἥρπασεν τὸν Φίλιππον (the Holy Spirit fell on the eunuch, and an angel of the Lord caught up Philip) supported by Codex Alexandrinus and several minuscule manuscripts: 103, 307, 322, 323, 385, 453, 467, 945, 1739, 1765, 1891, 2298, 36^{a}, it^{p}, vg, syr^{h}.

In Acts 12:18 it reads μεγας for ουκ ολιγος, the reading is supported by 307, 431, 1175, 2818, cop^{sa}, arm.

In Rev 1:5 it reads λουσαντι ημας απο along with the manuscripts 025, 046, 1006, 1859, 2042, 2065, 2073, 2138, 2432.

== History ==
The manuscript is dated by the INTF on the paleographical ground to the 12th or 13th century.

The manuscript was examined by Montfaucon, Wettstein, Paulin Martin, and Henri Omont. C. R. Gregory saw the manuscript in 1885. Herman C. Hoskier collated text of the Apocalypse.

Formerly it was labelled by 18^{a}, 21^{p}, and 19^{r}. In 1908 Gregory gave number 94 for it.

It is currently housed at the Bibliothèque nationale de France (Fonds Coislin, Gr. 202.2), at Paris.

== See also ==
- List of New Testament minuscules
- Biblical manuscript
- Textual criticism
