= Minuscule 307 =

- New Testament manuscript
- Text: Acts, Cath.
- Date: 10th century
- Script: Greek
- Now at: Bibliothèque nationale de France
- Size: 32 cm by 23.5 cm
- Type: mixed
- Category: III
- Note: marginalia

Minuscule 307 (in the Gregory-Aland numbering), A^{πρ11} (Soden), is a Greek minuscule manuscript of the New Testament, on parchment. Palaeographically it has been assigned to the 10th century. It has marginalia. Aland's III Category.

== Description ==
The codex contains the text of the Acts of the Apostles and Catholic epistles on 254 parchment leaves (32 cm by 23.5 cm). The text is written in one column per page. The biblical text is surrounded by a catena.

The text is divided according to the κεφαλαια (chapters), whose numbers are given at the margin, and the τιτλοι (titles of chapters) at the top of the pages.

It contains Prolegomena, tables of the κεφαλαια (tables of contents) before each book, and subscriptions at the end of each sacred book, with numbers of stichoi.

== Text ==
The Greek text of the codex Aland placed it in Category III. Aland's Profile in Acts: 35^{1} 20^{1/2} 32^{2} 19^{S}; in Cath: 62^{1} 8^{1/2} 17^{2} 15^{S}.

In Acts 8:39 instead of πνεῦμα κυρίου (spirit of the Lord) it has unusual textual variant πνεῦμα ἅγιον ἐπέπεσεν ἐπὶ τὸν εὐνοῦχον, ἄγγελος δέ κυρίου ἥρπασεν τὸν Φίλιππον (the Holy Spirit fell on the eunuch, and an angel of the Lord caught up Philip) supported by Codex Alexandrinus and several minuscule manuscripts: 94, 103, 322, 323, 385, 453, 467, 945, 1739, 1765, 1891, 2298, 36^{a}, it^{p}, vg, syr^{h}.

In Acts 18:17 it reads παντες οι Ιουδαιοι for παντες; the reading is supported by minuscule 431.

In Acts 12:18 it reads μεγας for ουκ ολιγος, the reading is supported by 94, 431, 1175, 2818, cop^{sa}, arm.

== History ==
The manuscript was examined by Montfaucon, Wettstein, and Cramer. It was examined and described by Paulin Martin. C. R. Gregory saw the manuscript in 1885.

Formerly it was designated by 15^{a}. In 1908 Gregory gave number 307 for it.

The manuscript is currently housed at the Bibliothèque nationale de France (Fonds Coislin, Gr. 25) at Paris.

== See also ==
- List of New Testament minuscules
- Biblical manuscript
- Textual criticism
