= Lectionary 147 =

Lectionary ℓ 147
- New Testament manuscript
- Text: Apostolos
- Date: 12th century
- Script: Greek
- Now at: Bibliothèque nationale de France
- Size: 31.5 by 21.5 cm
- Type: Byzantine / Alexandrian

Lectionary 147, designated by siglum ℓ 147 (in the Gregory-Aland numbering) is a Greek manuscript of the New Testament, on parchment leaves. Paleographically it has been assigned to the 12th century.

== Description ==
The codex contains Lessons from Gospels and Acts of the Apostles lectionary (Apostolos), on 274 parchment leaves (31.5 cm by 21.5 cm). The text is written in Greek minuscule letters, in one column per page, 21-23 lines per page. It is ill written, with a Latin version over some portions of the text.

In Acts 5:28 it reads παραγγελια, along with manuscripts: 𝔓^{74}, א*, A, B, ar, d, gig, vg, cop^{sa}; majority reads ου παραγγελια (א^{c}, D^{gr}, E, P, (Ψ ουχι), 049, 056, 0142, 88, 104, 181, 326, 330, 436, 451, 614, 629, 630, 945, 1241, 1505, 1739, 1877, 2127, 2412, 2492, 2495, Byz, Lect, e, h, p, syr^{p, h}, cop^{sa}, arm, eth).

In Acts 12:25 it reads απο Ιερουσαλημ (from Jerusalem) – D, Ψ, 181, 436, 614, 2412, ℓ 809, ℓ 1021, ℓ 1141, ℓ 1364, ℓ 1439, ar, d, gig, vg, Chrysostom; majority reads εις Ιερουσαλημ (to Jerusalem).

In Acts 15:7 it reads εν υμιν εξελεξατο ο θεος along with 𝔓^{74}, א, A, B, C, 33, 81, 88, 181, 436, 630, 945, 1739, ar, arm, geo;

== History ==
The manuscript was written by Theophylact, a monk. It once belonged to Colbert. The manuscript was examined by Paulin Martin. Formerly it was designated by 25^{a}, in 1908 Gregory gave for it number 147, that number formerly belonged to Latin manuscript. Gregory saw it in 1885.

The manuscript is cited in the critical editions of the Greek New Testament (UBS3, UBS4).

Currently the codex is located in the Bibliothèque nationale de France (Gr. 319), at Paris.

== See also ==
- List of New Testament lectionaries
- Biblical manuscript
- Textual criticism
