= Minuscule 431 =

- New Testament manuscript
- Name: Molsheimensis
- Text: New Testament (except Rev.)
- Date: 12th century
- Script: Greek
- Now at: Strasbourg
- Size: 13.3 cm by 10.3 cm
- Type: mixed, Byzantine
- Category: III, V
- Note: marginalia

Minuscule 431 (in the Gregory-Aland numbering), δ 268 (in the Soden numbering), is a Greek minuscule manuscript of the New Testament, on parchment. Palaeographically it has been assigned to the 12th century. It has marginalia. It is known as Codex Molsheimensis.

== Description ==
The codex contains the text of the New Testament except the Book of Revelation on 275 parchment leaves (13.3 cm by 10.3 cm). It is written in one column per page, in 28-33 lines per page. The large initial letters are in gold.

The text is divided according to the κεφαλαια (chapters), whose numbers are given at the margin, and the τιτλοι (titles) at the top of the pages.

It contains the Epistula ad Carpianum, Prolegomena, tables of the κεφαλαια (tables of contents) before each book, lectionary markings at the margin (later hand), and the Euthalian Apparatus.

The Pericope Adulterae (John 7:53-8:11) was added by a later hand in the 15th century (as in codex 470).

The order of books: Gospels, Acts, Pauline epistles, Catholic epistles.

== Text ==
The Greek text of the Acts of the Apostles and the Catholic epistles Aland placed in Category III. It exhibits a remarkable text. The text of the Pauline epistles and Apocalypse has lower value, it is a representative of the Byzantine text-type. Aland placed it in Category V.

According to the Claremont Profile Method it belongs to the textual cluster 1167.

According to Scrivener it has "many unusual readings" (probably it refers to the Acts).

In Acts 12:18 it reads μεγας for ουκ ολιγος, the reading is supported by 94, 307, 1175, 2818, cop^{sa}, arm.

In Acts 18:17 it reads παντες οι Ιουδαιοι for παντες; the reading is supported by minuscule 307.

== History ==
The manuscript formerly belonged to Domfrauen von Andlau. In 1607 it was presented to the Jesuits Collegium in Molsheim (hence name of the codex) in Alsace. Jesuit Hermann Goldhagen made some extracts from the codex in 1753. Arendt made a collation from it. The manuscript was added to the list of the New Testament manuscripts by Scholz (1794-1852). C. R. Gregory saw it in 1891.

The codex is cited in critical editions of the Greek New Testament (NA26).

It is currently housed at the Priesterseminarium (1) in Strasbourg.

== See also ==
- List of New Testament minuscules
- Biblical manuscript
- Textual criticism
