= Minuscule 453 =

- New Testament manuscript
- Name: Pius II
- Text: Acts of the Apostles, Catholic epistles
- Date: 14th century
- Script: Greek
- Now at: Vatican Library
- Size: 35 cm by 27.3 cm
- Type: mixed
- Category: III

Minuscule 453 (in the Gregory-Aland numbering), A^{πρ40} (in the Soden numbering), is a Greek minuscule manuscript of the New Testament, on a parchment. Palaeographically it has been assigned to the 14th century. Formerly it was labelled by 81^{a}.

== Description ==
The codex contains the text of the Acts of the Apostles, Catholic epistles on 295 parchment leaves (35 cm by 27.3 cm). The text is written in two columns per page, in 32 lines per page.

It contains Prolegomena to the Acts, table of the κεφαλαια (tables of contents) to the Acts, numbers of the κεφαλαια (chapters) to the Acts are given at the margin, the τιτλοι (titles) in Acts and epistles, and a commentary.

== Text ==
The Greek text of the codex is a mixture of text-types. Aland placed it in Category III.

In Acts 8:37 it has additional verse together with the manuscripts Codex Laudanius, 323, 945, 1739, 1891, 2818 (formerly 36^{a}), and several others.

In Acts 8:39 instead of πνεῦμα κυρίου (spirit of the Lord) it has unusual textual variant πνεῦμα ἅγιον ἐπέπεσεν ἐπὶ τὸν εὐνοῦχον, ἄγγελος δέ κυρίου ἥρπασεν τὸν Φίλιππον (the Holy Spirit fell on the eunuch, and an angel of the Lord caught up Philip) supported by several minuscule manuscripts: Codex Alexandrinus, 94, 103, 307, 322, 323, 385, 467, 945, 1739, 1765, 1891, 2298, 36^{a}, it^{p}, vg, syr^{h}.

In Acts 20:28 it reads του κυριου — Papyrus 74, A, C*, D, E, Ψ, 33, 36, 945, 1739, 1891, instead of Alexandrian του Θεου or Byzantine του κυριου και του Θεου.

== History ==
The manuscript was dated by Scrivener to the 11th century. Gregory dated it to the 14th century. Currently it is dated by the INTF to the 14th century.

The manuscript was examined by Birch in some passages of the Acts (1:24; 20:26.27.28.29.32) and by Scholz in some passages of the 1 John (4:16; 5:7.20). C. R. Gregory saw it in 1886.

The manuscript was added to the list of the New Testament manuscripts by Scholz (1794–1852). Formerly it was labelled by 81^{a}. In 1908 Gregory gave the number 453 to it.

It is currently housed at the Vatican Library (Barb. gr. 582) in Rome.

== See also ==
- List of New Testament minuscules
- Biblical manuscript
- Textual criticism
