= Codex Alexandrinus =

5th-century handwritten Bible copy in Greek

Uncial 02
- New Testament manuscript
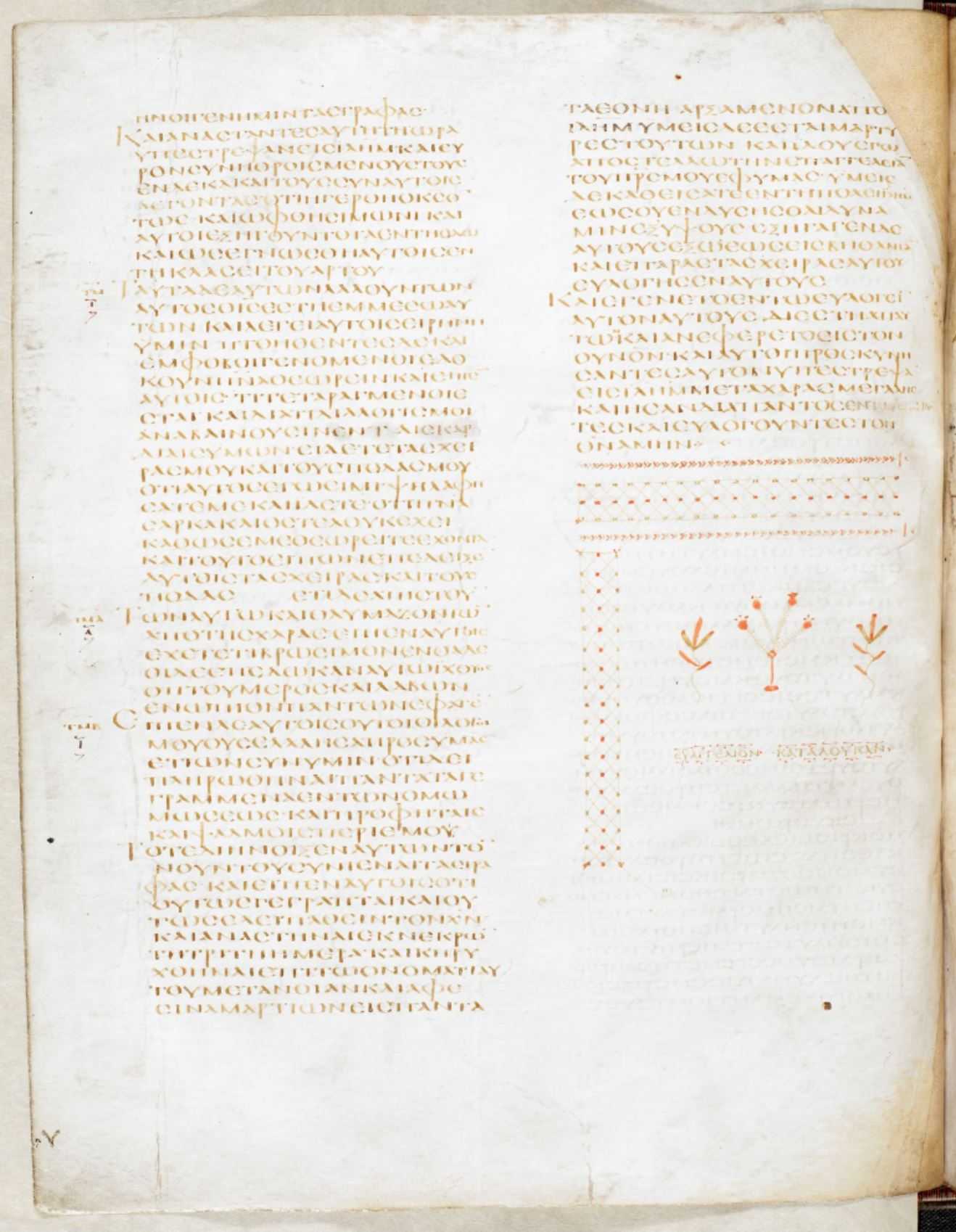
- Folio 41v from the Codex Alexandrinus contains the end of the Gospel of Luke with the decorative tailpiece found at the end of each book
- Name: Alexandrinus
- Sign: A
- Text: Greek Old Testament and Greek New Testament†
- Date: c. 400-440
- Script: Greek
- Now at: British Library
- Size: 32 × 26 cm (12.6 × 10.4 in)
- Type: Byzantine text-type in Gospels, Alexandrian in rest of NT
- Category: III (in Gospels), I (in rest of NT)
- Hand: elegantly written but with errors
- Note: close to 𝔓^{74} in Acts, and to 𝔓^{47} in Rev

The Codex Alexandrinus is a manuscript of the Greek Bible, (Note: The Greek Bible in this context refers to the Bible used by Greek-speaking Christians who lived in Egypt and elsewhere during the early history of Christianity. This Bible contained both the Old and New Testaments in Koine Greek.) written on parchment. It is designated by the siglum A or 02 in the Gregory-Aland numbering of New Testament manuscripts, and δ 4 in the von Soden numbering of New Testament manuscripts. It contains the majority of the Greek Old Testament and the Greek New Testament. It is one of the four Great uncial codices (these being manuscripts which originally contained the whole of both the Old and New Testaments). Along with Codex Sinaiticus and Vaticanus, it is one of the earliest and most complete manuscripts of the Bible. Using the study of comparative writing styles (palaeography), it has been dated to the fifth century.

It derives its name from the city of Alexandria (in Egypt), where it resided for a number of years before it was brought by the Eastern Orthodox Patriarch Cyril Lucaris from Alexandria to Constantinople (modern day Istanbul in Turkey). It was then given to Charles I of England in the 17th century. Bishop Brian Walton assigned Alexandrinus the capital Latin letter A in the Polyglot Bible (a multi-language version of the Bible with the different languages placed in parallel columns) of 1657. This designation was maintained when the New Testament manuscript list system was standardized by Swiss theologian and textual critic Johann J. Wettstein in 1751. Thus Alexandrinus held the first position in the manuscript list.

Until the later purchase of Codex Sinaiticus, biblical scholar and textual critic Frederick H. A. Scrivener described it as the best manuscript of the Greek Bible deposited in Britain. Today, it rests along with Codex Sinaiticus in one of the showcases in the Sir John Ritblat Gallery of the British Library in London, U.K. A full photographic reproduction of the New Testament volume (shelf number Royal MS 1. D. V-VIII) is available on the British Library's website.

== Description ==
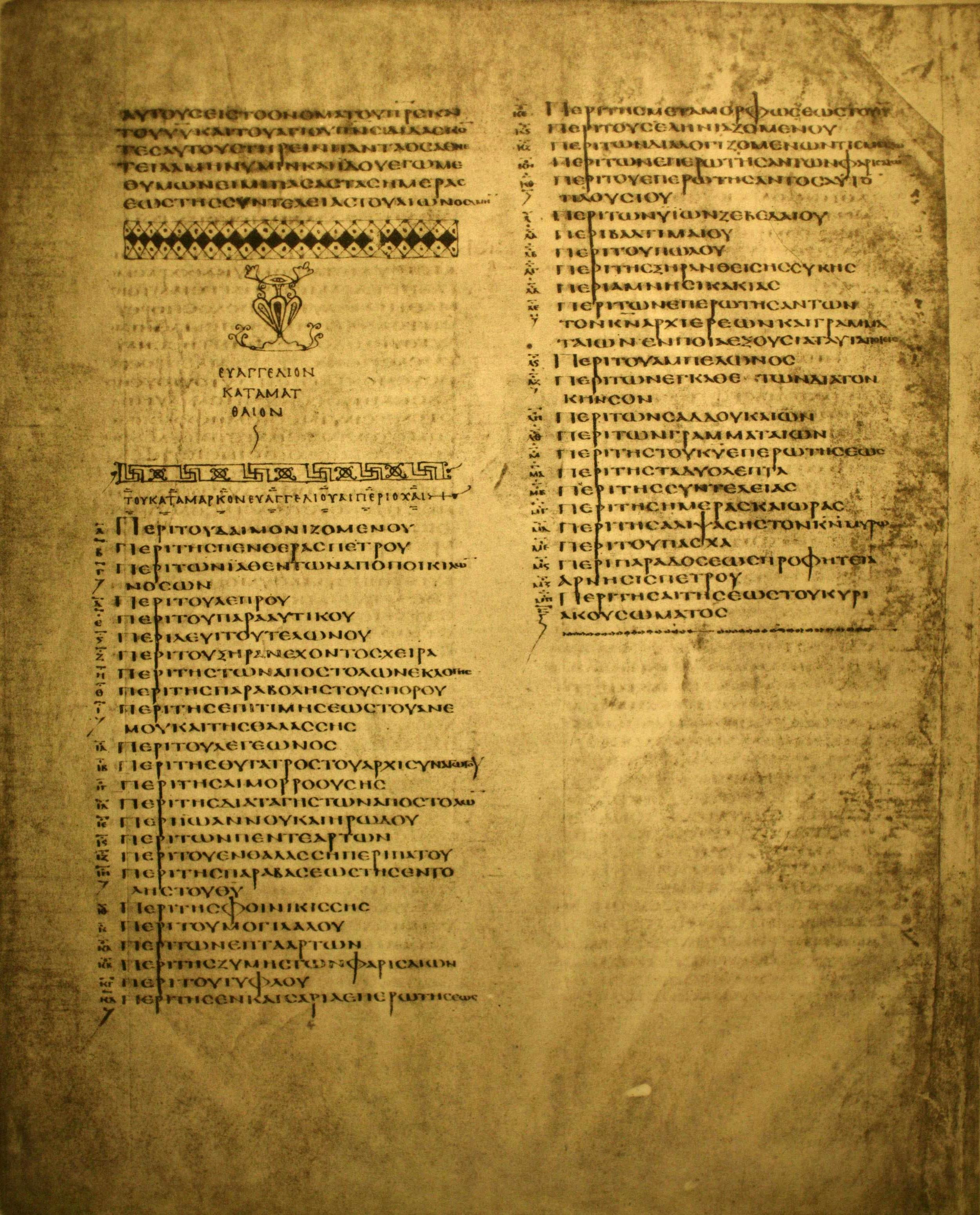
List of chapters (κεφάλαια) in the Gospel of Mark

The manuscript is a codex (precursor to the modern book format) made from 773 vellum folios (specific name for pages in a codex) measuring 12.6 × 10.4 inches (32 × 26 cm), bound in quarto format (parchment leaves placed on top of each other, folded in half vertically, and then folded in half again horizontally, to make a single block, then stitched together with others to create a book), which now comprise four volumes. Most of the folios were originally gathered into quires of eight leaves each (this being eight parchment leaves placed on top of each other, then folded as per quarto above). Scholar B. H. Cowper describes the vellum as "thin, fine, and very beautiful". In modern times it was rebound into sets of six leaves each. Cowper's further description of the pages note they are "often discoloured at the edges", which have been damaged by age and more so through "the ignorance or carelessness of the modern binder, who has not always spared the text, especially at the upper inner margin". Scrivener noted that "[t]he vellum has fallen into holes in many places, and since the ink peels off for every age whensoever a leaf is touched a little roughly, no one is allowed to handle the manuscript except for good reasons." Three volumes contain the Septuagint (the Greek version of the Old Testament, also known as the LXX), of which the total count of folios for each volume is 279, 238, and 118 with ten leaves lost. The fourth volume contains the New Testament in the remaining 144 folios, with 31 leaves lost. In the fourth volume, 1 and 2 Clement are also missing leaves, perhaps 3.

The text in the codex is written in two columns in uncial script, with between 49 and 51 lines per column, and 20 to 25 letters per line. The beginning lines of each book are written in red ink, and sections within the book are marked by a larger letter set into the margin. The text is written continuously, with no division of words (known as Scriptio continua), but some pauses are observed in places in which a dot should be between two words. There are no accents or breathing marks, except a few added by a later hand. The punctuation was written by the first hand. The poetical books of the Old Testament are written stichometrically (this being a new verse/phrase starting on a new line). The Old Testament quotations in the text of New Testament are marked in the margin by the sign 〉(known as a diplai).

The only decorations in the codex are tail-pieces at the end of each book (see illustration), and it also shows a tendency to increase the size of the first letter of each sentence. The larger letters at the beginning of the sections stand out in the margin as in codices Ephraemi and Basilensis. Codex Alexandrinus is the oldest manuscript to use larger letters to indicate new sections.

Iotacistic errors occur in the text: αὶ is exchanged for ε, εὶ for ὶ and η for ὶ. This is, however, no more than seen in other manuscripts of the same date. The letters Ν and Μ are occasionally confused, and the cluster ΓΓ (gg) is substituted with ΝΓ (ng). This may be an argument which points to Egypt as where the codex was produced, but it is not universally accepted.

The handwriting from the beginning of Luke to 1 Corinthians 10:8 differs from that in the rest of the manuscript. Some letters have Coptic shapes (f.e. Α (alpha), Μ (mu), Δ (delta), and Π (pi)). The letters are more widely spaced and are a little larger than elsewhere. Δ has extended base and Π has extended cross-stroke. Numerals are not expressed by letters except in Revelation 7:4; 21:17. In the past the codex had been judged to have been carelessly written, with many errors of transcription, but not so many as in Codex Sinaiticus, and no more than Codex Vaticanus.

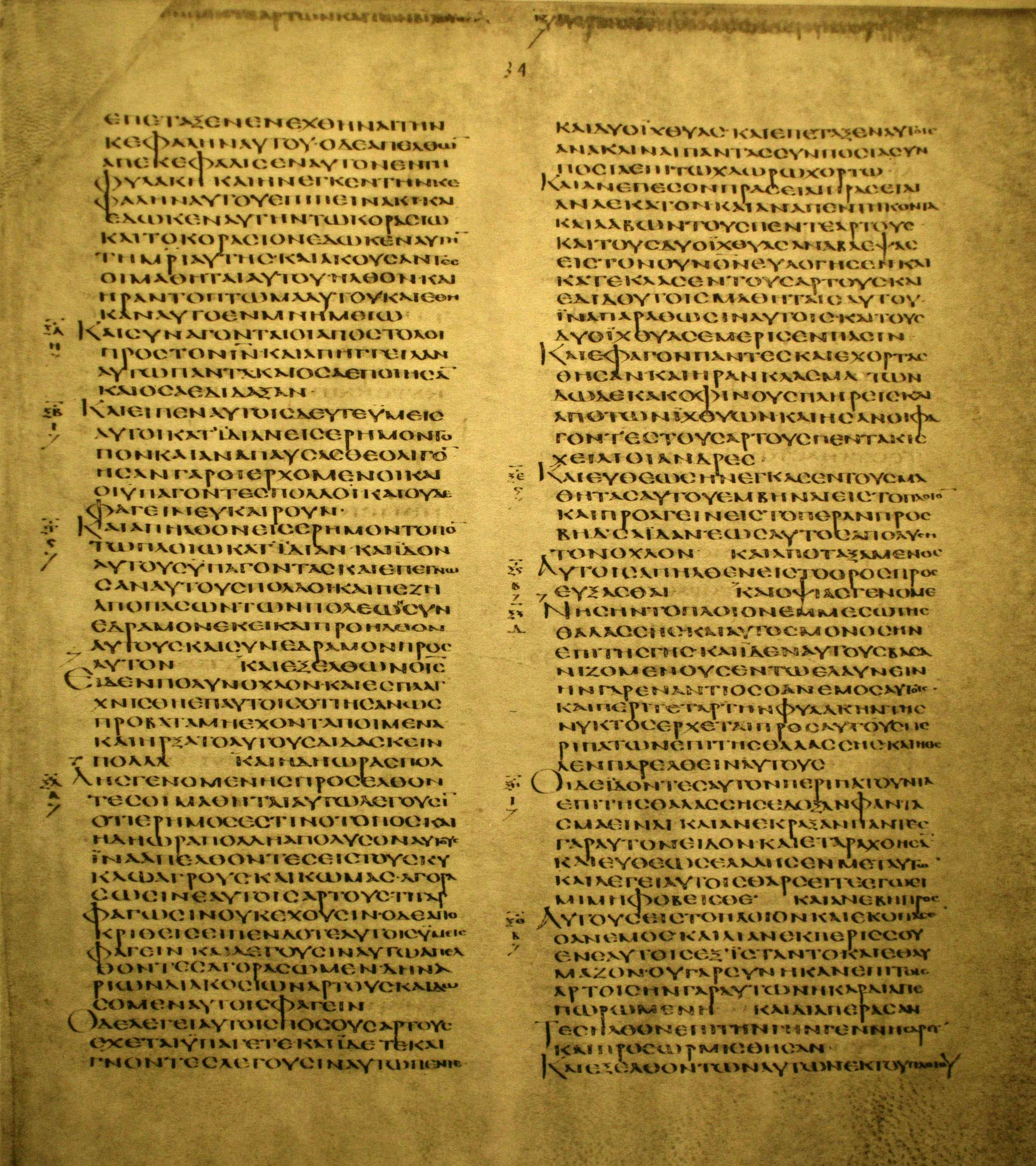
A vacant space proportionate to the break in the sense follows the end of a paragraph (page with text of Mark 6:27–54)

The majuscule letters have elegant shape, but a little less simple than those in Codex Sinaiticus and Codex Vaticanus. At the end of a line, these letters are often very small, and much of the writing is very pale and faint. Punctuation is more frequent, usually on a level with the top of the preceding letter, while a vacant space, proportionate to the break in the sense, follows the end of a paragraph. At the end of each book the colophon is ornamented by pretty volutes from the initial copyist. The Ammonian Sections with references to the Eusebian Canons (an early system of dividing the four Gospels into different sections, developed by early church writer Eusebius of Caesarea) stand in the margin of the Gospels. It contains divisions into larger sections (known as κεφάλαια (kephalaia), or chapters), the headings of these sections (known as τίτλοι / titloi) stand at the top of the pages. The places at which sections start are indicated throughout the Gospels, and in Luke and John their numbers are placed in the margin of each column. To all the Gospels (except Matthew, due to several pages missing at the beginning) is prefixed by a table of contents (also known as κεφάλαια).

The various Euthalian Apparatus sections into which the Acts, Epistles, and Apocalypse were divided (similar to Eusebius' system for the Gospels) are not indicated in this manuscript. A cross appears occasionally as a separation in the Book of Acts. A larger letter in the margin throughout the New Testament marks the beginning of a paragraph.

The number of scribes who worked on the codex has been disputed. According to biblical and classical scholar Frederic Kenyon there were five scribes, two scribes in the Old Testament (I and II) and three in the New (III, IV, and V). Subsequently, textual critics Theodore Skeat and Milne argued there were only two or possibly three scribes, (Note: Kenyon in 1939 noticed: "this seems to ignore certain marked differences of script". See Kenyon, Our Bible and the Ancient Manuscripts.) a view widely accepted by 20th-21st century scholars(such as biblical scholar and textual critic Bruce Metzger, biblical scholar and textual critic Kurt Aland, textual critic Juan Hernández Jr., and textual critic Dirk Jongkind).

Many corrections have been made to the manuscript, some of them by the original scribe, but the majority of them by later hands. The corrected form of the text agrees with that seen in Codex Bezae (D), Codex Petropolitanus Purpureus (N), Codex Monacensis (X), Codex Macedoniensis (Y), Codex Tischendorfianus IV (Γ), Codex Koridethi (Θ), Codex Petropolitanus (Π), Codex Rossanensis (Σ), Codex Beratinus (Φ) and the majority of minuscule manuscripts. Kenyon observed that Codex Alexandrinus had been "extensively corrected, though much more in some books than in others". In the Pentateuch, whole sentences were erased and a new text substituted. Kings was the least corrected of the books. In the Book of Revelation only 1 of its 84 singular readings was corrected, the rest remained uncorrected. This is in stark contrast with Codex Sinaiticus, in which 120 of the Apocalypse's 201 singular readings were corrected in the 7th century.

Each leaf has Arabic numeration, set in the verso of the lower margin. The first surviving leaf of Matthew has number 26. The 25 leaves now lost must have been extant when that note was written.

== Contents ==
The inter-relationship between various significant ancient manuscripts of the Old Testament (some identified by their siglum). LXX here denotes the original Septuagint; "A" denotes the Codex Alexandrinus

The codex contains a nearly complete copy of the LXX, including the deuterocanonical books (those books not accepted as authoritative by some Christians, but accepted by certain Christian denominations) 3 and 4 Maccabees, Psalm 151 and the 14 Odes. The Epistle to Marcellinus (attributed to Saint Athanasius) and the Eusebian summary of the Psalms are inserted before the Book of Psalms (an overview of the Psalms written by the early Christian writer Eusebius of Caesarea). It also contains all of the books of the common modern 27-book New Testament, however the pages containing Matthew 1:1–25:5 are not extant. The codex also contains 1 Clement (lacking 57:7–63; this is a letter attributed to the early Christian writer Clement of Rome) and the homily known as 2 Clement (up to 12:5a; another letter attributed to Clement of Rome). The books of the Old Testament are thus distributed: Genesis – 2 Chronicles (first volume), Hosea – 4 Maccabees (second volume), Psalms – Sirach (third volume). The New Testament (fourth volume) books are in the order: Gospels, Acts of the Apostles, General epistles, Pauline epistles (Hebrews placed between 2 Thessalonians and 1 Timothy), Book of Revelation.

There is an appendix marked in the index, which lists the Psalms of Solomon and probably contained more apocryphal/pseudepigraphical books (books written which have been attributed to certain famous people mentioned in the Bible, but likely of unknown authorship), but it has been torn off and the pages containing these books have also been lost.

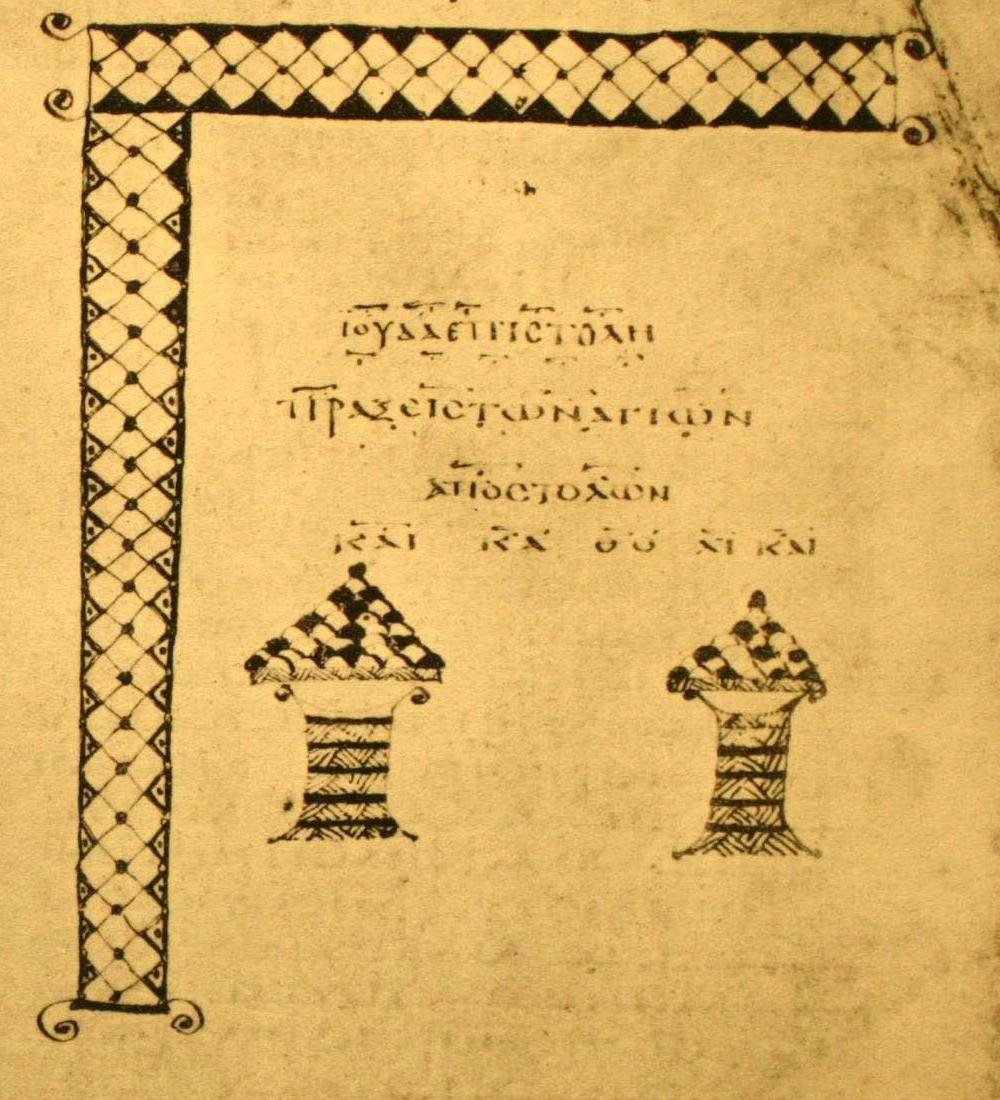
Colophon at the end of the Epistle of Jude. According to this colophon the Acts of the Apostles follow General epistles

Due to damage and lost folios, various passages are missing or have defects:

- Lacking: 1 Sam 12:17–14:9 (1 leaf); Ps 49:20–79:11 (9 leaves); Matt 1:1-25:6 (26 leaves); John 6:50-8:52 (2 leaves); 2 Cor 4:13-12:6 (3 leaves); 1 Clement 57:7-63 (1 leaf) and 2 Clement 12:5a-fin. (2 leaves);
- Damaged: Gen 14:14–17, 15:1–5, 15:16–19, 16:6–9 (lower portion of torn leaf lost);
- Defects due to torn leaves: Genesis 1:20–25, 1:29–2:3, Lev 8:6,7,16; Sirach 50:21f, 51:5;
- Lacunae on the edges of almost every page of the Apocalypse.
- The ornamented colophon of the Epistle to Philemon has been cut out.

== Textual features ==
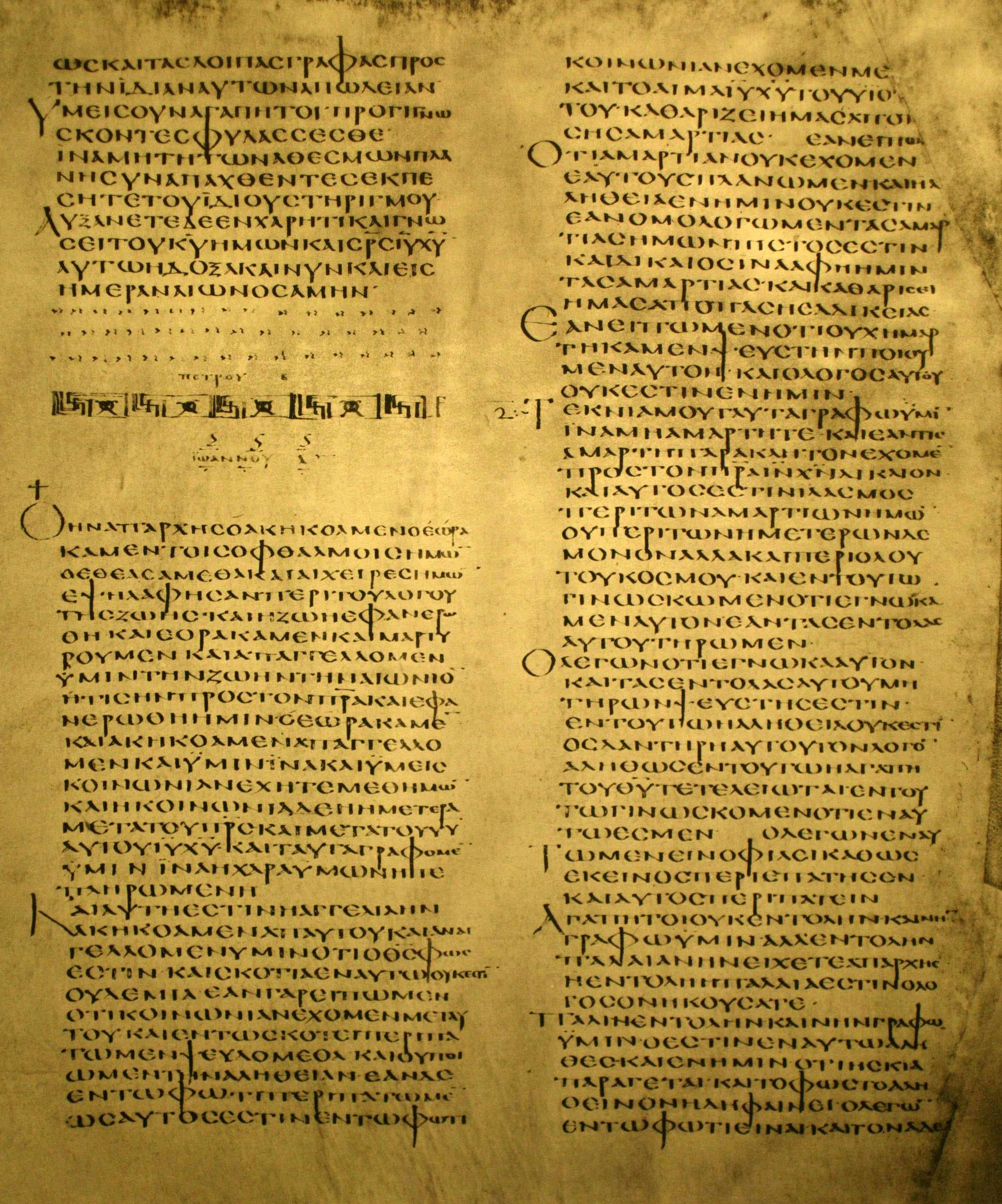
The end of the 2 Epistle of Peter and the beginning of the 1 Epistle of John in the same column

Textual critics have had a challenging task in classifying the text of the codex, specifically when it comes to the New Testament; the exact relationship to other text-types and manuscript families is still disputed, and as such the Greek text of the codex is considered to be of mixed text-types. The text-types are groups of different New Testament manuscripts which share specific or generally related readings, which then differ from each other group, and thus the conflicting readings can separate the groups. These are then used to determine the original text as published; there are three main groups with names: Alexandrian, Western, and Byzantine. The codex is a representative of the Byzantine text-type in the Gospels (the text-type's oldest example), and the rest of the New Testament books are of the Alexandrian text-type, with some Western readings. As the text in the codex is believed to have come from several different traditions, different parts of the codex are not of equal textual value. Aland placed it in Category III in the Gospels, and in Category I in rest of the books of the New Testament according to his manuscript text classification system. Category III manuscripts are described as having "a small but not a negligible proportion of early readings, with a considerable encroachment of [Byzantine] readings, and significant readings from other sources as yet unidentified"; Category I manuscripts are depicted as featuring "a very high proportion of the early text, presumably the original text, which has not been preserved in its purity in any one manuscript."

Text of the Gospels

The Byzantine text of the Gospels has a number of Alexandrian features, with some affinities to the textual Family Π. Biblical scholar and textual critic Hermann von Soden associated the text of the gospels with Family Π, though it is not a pure member of this family. According to biblical scholar and textual critic Burnett Streeter, it is the earliest Greek manuscript which gives us approximately the text of Lucian the Martyr (who is believed to have created a critical recension of both the Old and New Testaments), but a small proportion of the readings seem to be earlier.

Text of the rest of the codex

Alexandrinus follows the Alexandrian readings through the rest of the New Testament; however, the text goes from closely resembling Codex Sinaiticus in the Pauline epistles to more closely resembling the text of a number of papyri (𝔓^{74} for Acts, 𝔓^{47} for the Apocalypse). The text of Acts frequently agrees with the biblical quotations made by the 4th century Christian writer Athanasius of Alexandria. In the Pauline Epistles its text is closer to Codex Sinaiticus than to Codex Vaticanus. In the General Epistles it represents a different subtype than Codex Sinaiticus and Codex Vaticanus. In Revelation it agrees with Codex Ephraemi and 𝔓^{115} against Codex Sinaiticus and 𝔓^{47}. According to Metzger, in Revelation and in several books of the Old Testament it has the best text of all manuscripts. In the Old Testament its text often agrees with Codex Sinaiticus.

=== Some Textual Variants ===
==== Old Testament ====
Genesis 5:25

εκατον και ογδοηκοντα επτα ετη (187 in the marginal notes/ 167 years in the text ) – A
εκατον και εξηκοντα επτα ετη (167 years) – B

Genesis 11:13

ἔτη τετρακόσια "τριάκοντα" καὶ ἐγέννησεν

(430 years) – A

ἔτη τετρακόσια καὶ ἐγέννησεν (400 years) – B

Deuteronomy 31:15

εν στυλω (in a pillar) – A
εν νεφελη (in a cloud) – B

Joshua 10:42

ελαβεν (took) – A
επαταξεν (struck) – B

Joshua 11:1

μαδων (maroon) – A
μαρρων (mud) – B

Judges 18:30

υιος Μωυση – A
υιου Μανασση – B

Ezra 10:22 (9:22 LXX)

Ωκειδηλος – A
Ωκαιληδος – B

Psalm 9:35

κοπον (work) – A
πονον (pain) – B

==== New Testament ====
Example of differences between Family Π and Codex Alexandrinus in Mark 10:50–51
Family Π	Codex Alexandrinus	Differences
ο δε αποβαλων το ιματιον αυτου αναστας ηλθε προς τον ι̅ν̅· και αποκριθεις ο ι̅ς̅ λεγει αυτω τι σοι θελεις ποιησω; ο δε τυφλος ειπεν αυτω· ραββουνι ινα αναβλεψω·	ο δε αποβαλων το ιματιον αυτου αναστας ηλθεν προς τον ι̅ν̅· και αποκριθεις λεγει αυτω ο ι̅ς̅ τι θελεις ποιησω σοι· ο δε τυφλος ειπεν αυτω· ραββουνι ινα αναβλεψω·	– Ν εφελκυστικον order of words –
Having discarded his cloak, standing up he came towards Jesus. And in response, Jesus said to him, "What for you do you want me to do? The blind man said to him, "Rabbi: that I would be able to see."	Having discarded his cloak, standing up he came towards Jesus. And in response, said to him Jesus, "What do you want me to do for you? The blind man said to him, "Rabbi: that I would be able to see."	

Mark 16:9–20

incl. – A C D K W Γ Δ Θ ƒ^{13} 28 33 565 700 892 1241 1424 ℓ 844 ℓ 2211 Byz
omit – א B k sy^{s} arm

Luke 4:17

ἀνοίξας (opened) – A B L W Ξ 33 892 1195 1241 ℓ 547 syr^{s,}^{h,}^{p} sa bo
ἀναπτύξας (unrolled) – א D^{c} K Δ Θ Π Ψ ƒ^{1} ƒ^{13} 28 565 700 1009 1010 Byz

John 1:39

ωρα ην ως εκτη (about the sixth hour) – A
ωρα ην ως δεκατη (about the tenth hour) – Majority of manuscripts

Acts 8:39

πνεῦμα ἅγιον ἐπέπεσεν ἐπὶ τὸν εὐνοῦχον, ἄγγελος δέ κυρίου ἥρπασεν τὸν Φίλιππον (the Holy Spirit fell on the eunuch, and an angel of the Lord caught up Philip) – A 94 103 307 322 323 385 453 467 945 1739 1765 1891 2298 2818 p vg syr^{h}
πνεῦμα κυρίου (spirit of the Lord) – majority of manuscripts

Acts 11:20

Ἔλληνας (Greeks) – A 𝔓^{74} א^{c} D
εὐαγγελιστάς (Evangelists) – א*
Ἑλληνιστάς (Hellenists) – Majority of manuscripts

Acts 15:18

γνωστῶν ἀπ᾿ αἰῶνος τῷ κυρίῳ τὸ ἔργον αὐτοῦ – A 𝔓^{74}
γνωστὰ ἀπʼ αἰῶνος – א B C Ψ 33 81 323 1175 1505 co; Eus
γνωστὰ ἀπʼ αἰῶνός ἐστιν τῷ θεῷ πάντα τὰ ἔργα αὐτοῦ – Majority of manuscripts

Acts 20:28

του κυριου (of the Lord) – A 𝔓^{74} C* D E Ψ 33 36 453 945 1739 1891
του θεου (of God) – א B 614 1175 1505 vg sy bo^{ms} (Note: For other variants of this verse see: Textual variants in the Acts of the Apostles.)

Romans 2:5

ανταποδοσεως (reward) – A (singular reading)
αποκαλυψεως (revelation) – Majority of manuscripts

Romans 8:1

Ιησου μη κατα σαρκα περιπατουσιν – A D^{1} Ψ 81 629 2127 vg
Ιησου – א* B D* G 1739 1881 d g sa bo eth
Ιησου μη κατα σαρκα περιπατουσιν αλλα κατα πνευμα – Majority of manuscripts

1 Corinthians 2:1

μυστηριον (mystery) – A 𝔓^{46}^{(vid)} א* C 88 436 a r sy^{p} bo
μαρτυριον (witness) – Majority of manuscripts

1 Corinthians 7:5

τη προσευχη (prayer) – A 𝔓^{11}^{(vid)} 𝔓^{46} א* B C א G P Ψ 33 81 104 181 630 1962 it vg sa bo arm eth
τη νηστεια και τη προσευχη (fasting and prayer) – Majority of manuscripts

Ephesians 1:7

χρηστοτητος – A 365 bo
χαριτος – Majority of manuscripts

Ephesians 4:14

του διαβολου (of the devil) – A (singular reading)
της πλανης (of deceit) – Majority of manuscripts

1 Timothy 3:16

ὃς ἐφανερώθη (who was manifested) – A* א* C* G 33 365 442 2127 ℓ 599
θεός ἐφανερώθη (God was manifested) – A^{2} א^{e} C^{2} D^{c} K L P Ψ 81 330 630 1241 1739 Byz (Note: Metzger's notation, A^{vid} (for vidētur), signifies the reading is damaged and cannot be established with certainty.)

Hebrews 13:21

παντι εργω και λογω αγαθω (every good work and word) – A (singular reading)
παντι εργω αγαθω (every good work)- Majority of manuscripts

1 John 5:6

δι' ὕδατος καὶ αἵματος καὶ πνεύματος (through water and blood and spirit) – A א 104 424^{c} 614 1739^{c} 2412 2495 ℓ 598^{m} sy^{h} sa bo; Origen
δι' ὕδατος καὶ αἵματος (through water and blood) – Majority of manuscripts (Note: For other variants of this verse see: Textual variants in the First Epistle of John.)
New Testament scholar and textual critic Ehrman identified it as Orthodox corrupt reading.

Revelation 1:17

πρωτοτοκος (firstborn) – A (singular reading)
πρωτος (the first) – Majority of manuscripts

Revelation 5:9

ἠγόρασας τῷ θεῷ (redeemed to God) – A eth
ἠγόρασας τῷ θεῷ ἡμᾶς (redeemed us to God) – All other manuscripts containing this verse -

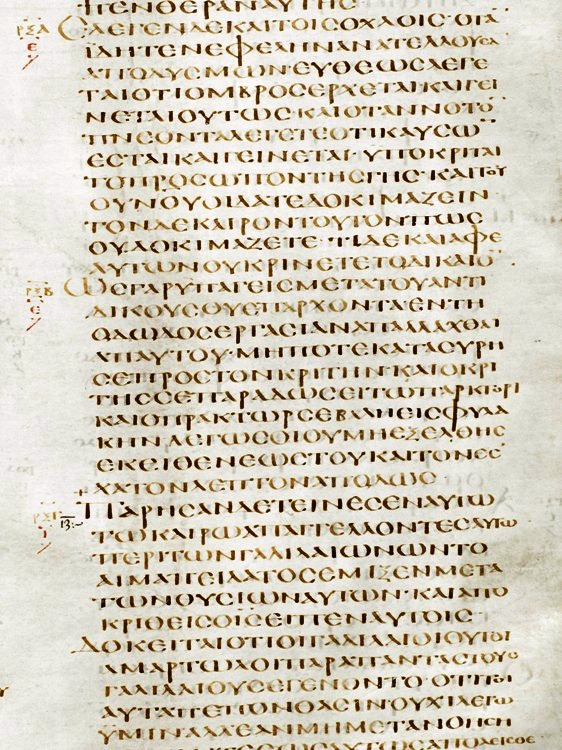
Text of Luke 12:54–13:4 in Codex Alexandrinus

=== Non-included Verses ===
Mark 15:28

omit – A א B C D Ψ Lect d k sy^{s} sa bo
incl. – Majority of manuscripts

Luke 22:43–44 (Christ's agony at Gethsemane)

omit – A 𝔓^{75} א* B T W 579 1071 ℓ 844 f sy^{s} sa bo^{pt}
incl. – Majority of manuscripts

Acts 8:37

incl. – E 323 453 945 1739 1891 2818
omit – A Majority of manuscripts

Acts 15:34

incl. – 𝔓^{127} C 33 D*^{, 1} 323 453 614 sy^{h**} sa bo^{mss}
omit – A 𝔓^{74} א B E L Ψ 81 Majority of manuscripts

Acts 24:7

omit – A 𝔓^{74} א B L P 049 81 1175 1241 p* s vg^{st} co
incl. – E Ψ 33 323 614 945 1505 1739 2464 gig sy^{p}

Acts 28:29

omit – A 𝔓^{74} א B E Ψ 048 33 81 1175 1739 2464 s sy^{p} co
incl. – Majority of manuscripts

Romans 16:24

omit – A 𝔓^{46} 𝔓^{61} א B C 81 1739 2464 b co
incl. – Majority of manuscripts

Alexandrinus is an important witness for the absence of Pericope Adultera (John 7:53–8:11). Gregory asserted in regard to the lost two leaves (John 6:50–8:52), "For by counting the lines we can prove that it was not in the book. There was not room for it". A similar counting involving missing leaves is done with Codex Ephraemi.

== History ==
=== Place of origin ===
The codex's original provenance is unknown. Cyril Lucaris was the first to suggest Alexandria as its place of origin, which has been the traditional view and is the most probable hypothesis. This popular view is based on an Arabic note on folio 1 (from the 13th or 14th century), which reads: "Bound to the Patriarchal Cell in the Fortress of Alexandria. Whoever removes it thence shall be excommunicated and cut off. Written by Athanasius the humble." "Athanasius the humble" is identified with Athanasius III, Patriarch of Alexandria from 1276 to 1316.

Burnett Hillman Streeter proposed Caesarea or Beirut for three reasons: 1) after the New Testament it contains the two Epistles of Clement; 2) it represents an eclectic text in the New Testament (Antiochian in the Gospels and Alexandrian in the Acts and Epistles), suggesting some place where the influence of Antioch and of Alexandria met; 3) the text of the Old Testament appears to be a non-Alexandrian text heavily revised by the Hexapla, as the Old Testament quotations in the New Testament portion more often agree with Alexandrinus against Vaticanus than not.

Theodore C. Skeat disputed the notion that the Codex Alexandrinus "had been in Alexandria from time immemorial". Instead, he thought that the codex was brought to Alexandria from Constantinople between 1308 and 1316. Cyril Lucaris then brought it back to Constantinople in 1621, and it was given to Charles I in 1627.

McKendrick proposed an Ephesian provenance for the codex.

A 17th-century Latin note on a flyleaf (from the binding in a royal library) states the codex was given to a patriarchate of Alexandria in 1098 (donum dedit cubicuo Patriarchali anno 814 Martyrum), although this may well be "merely an inaccurate attempt at deciphering the Arabic note by Athanasius" (possibly the patriarch Athanasius III). The authority for this statement is unknown.

A 2025 study by Mina Monier demonstrated that the somewhat odd collection of New Testament texts in Codex Alexandrinus (with Hebrews between 2 Thessalonians and 1 Timothy and the inclusion of 1-2 Clement) is paralleled in Coptic and Melkite canon lists. This observation supports the idea that the manuscript was produced in an Egyptian context.

=== Date ===
According to an Arabic note on the reverse of the first volume of the manuscript, the manuscript was written by the hand of Thecla, the martyr, a notable lady of Egypt, a little later than the Council of Nicaea (A.D. 325). Tregelles made another suggestion, the New Testament volume has long been mutilated, and begins now in the twenty-fifth chapter of Matthew, in which chapter the lesson for Thecla's Day stands. "We cannot be sure how the story arose. It may be that the manuscript was written in a monastery dedicated to Thecla." Tregelles thought that Thecla's name might have on this account been written in the margin above, which has been cut off, and that therefore the Egyptians imagined that Thecla had written it. Cyril Lucaris believed in Thecla's authorship, but the codex cannot be older than from late 4th century.

Codex Alexandrinus contains the Epistle of Athanasius on the Psalms to Marcellinus, so it cannot be considered earlier than A.D. 373 (terminus post quem). In the Acts and Epistles we cannot find such chapter divisions, whose authorship is ascribed to Euthalius, Bishop of Sulci, come into vogue before the middle of the fifth century. It is terminus ad quem. The presence of Epistle of Clement, which was once read in Churches recalls to a period when the canon of Scripture was in some particulars not quite settled. It is certain that the writing of the manuscript appears to be somewhat more advanced than that of the Vaticanus or Sinaiticus, especially in the enlargement of initial letters. It is also more decorated, though its ornamentations are already found in earlier manuscripts.

Codex Alexandrinus was written a generation after codices Sinaiticus and Vaticanus, but it may still belong to the fourth century. It cannot be later than the beginning of the fifth. It is currently dated by the INTF to the 5th century.

== In Britain ==
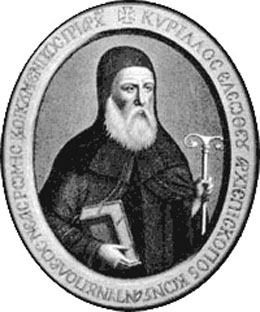
Cyril Lucaris, one of the former owners of the codex

The codex was brought to Constantinople in 1621 by Cyril Lucaris (a patriarch of Alexandria first, then later a patriarch of Constantinople). Lucaris was involved in a complex struggle with the Turkish government, the Catholic Church, and his own subordinates. He was supported by the English government, and presented the codex to James I in 1624, as gratitude for his help. The codex was presented through the hands of Thomas Roe (together with minuscule 49), the English ambassador at the court of the Sultan. James I died before the codex was sent to England, and the offer was transferred to Charles I in 1627. It was saved from the fire at Ashburnham House (the Cotton library) on 23 October 1731, by the librarian, Richard Bentley. It became a part of the Royal Library at the British Museum, and since 1973 has been in the British Library.

=== Collations and editions ===
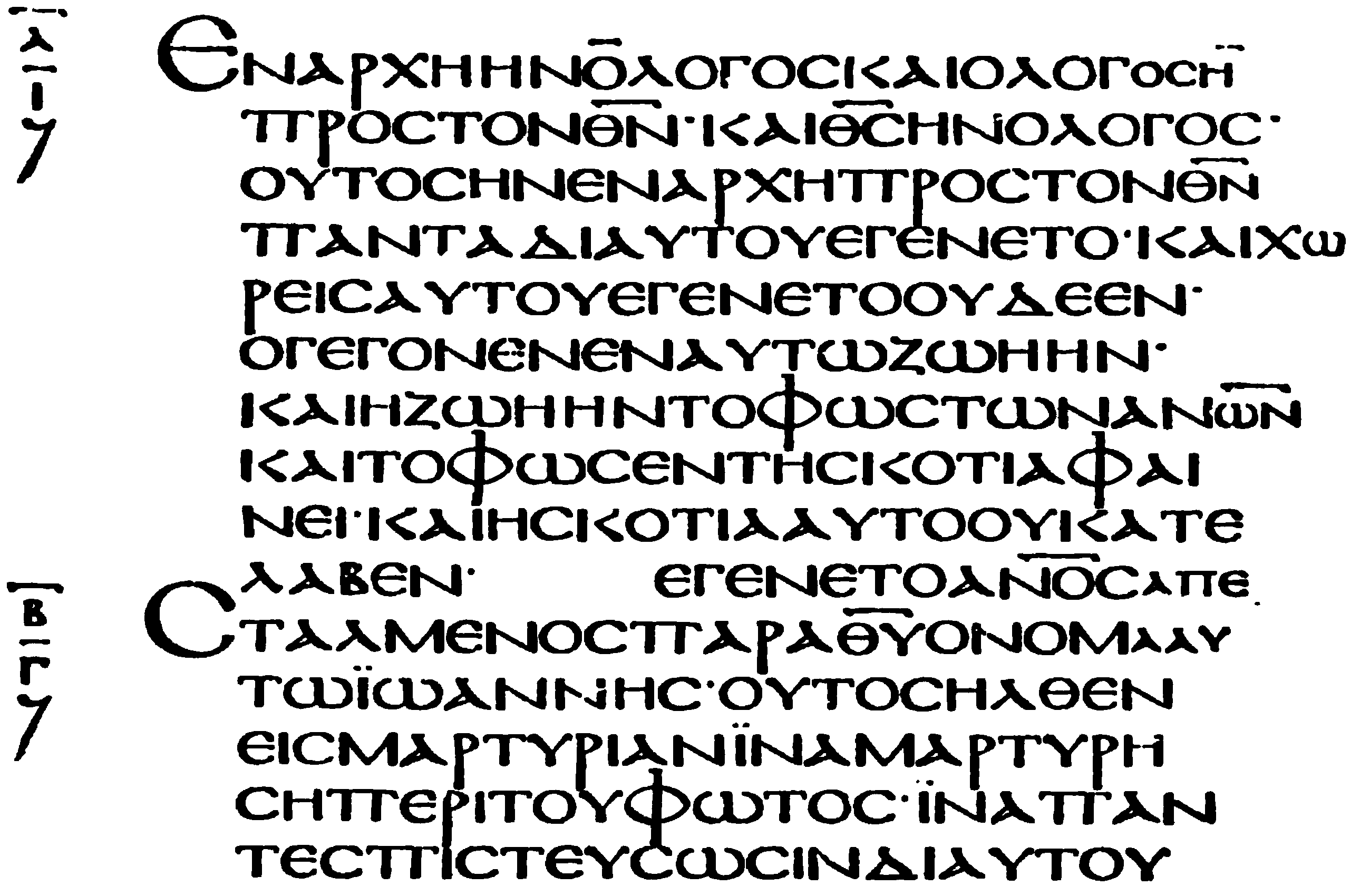
Fragment from Woide's facsimile edition (1786), containing text of John 1:1–7

The text of the Epistles of Clement from the codex was published in 1633 by Patrick Young, the Royal Librarian. A collation was made by Alexander Huish, Prebendary of Wells, for the London Polyglot Bible (1657). The text of the codex was cited in footnotes. Richard Bentley made a collation in 1675.

The Old Testament was edited by Ernst Grabe in 1707–1720, and the New Testament by Carl Gottfried Woide in 1786, in facsimile from wooden type, line for line, without spaces between the words, exactly mimicking the original. For the text in 1 Tim 3:16, the facsimile has Θ̅Σ̅ ἐφανερόθη, and Woide in his prolegomenon combats the opinion of Wettstein, who maintained that ος ἐφανερόθη was the original reading, and that the stroke, which in some lights can be seen across part of the Ο, arose from the middle-stroke part of a letter Ε being visible through the vellum. Wettstein's assertion was also disputed by F.H. Scrivener, who found that "Ε cut the Ο indeed . . . but cut it too high to have been reasonably mistaken by a careful observer for the diameter of Θ." Tregelles however agrees with Wettstein's reading of the codex, and states "as the result of repeated examinations, we can say distinctly that Woide was wrong, and Wetstein was right."

Woide's edition contained some typesetting errors, such as in the Epistle to Ephesians – ἐκλήθηθε for ἐκλήθητε (4:1) and πραόθητος for πραότητος (4:2). These errors were corrected in 1860 by B. H. Cowper, and E. H. Hansell, with three other manuscripts, in 1860. The Old Testament portion was also published in three folio volumes by Baber in 1816–1828. In 1879 and 1880, the entire codex was issued in photographic facsimile by the British Museum, under the supervision of E. M. Thompson. Frederic G. Kenyon edited a photographic facsimile of the New Testament with reduced size in 1909. The text of the Old Testament followed four parts in 1915.

=== Textual criticism ===
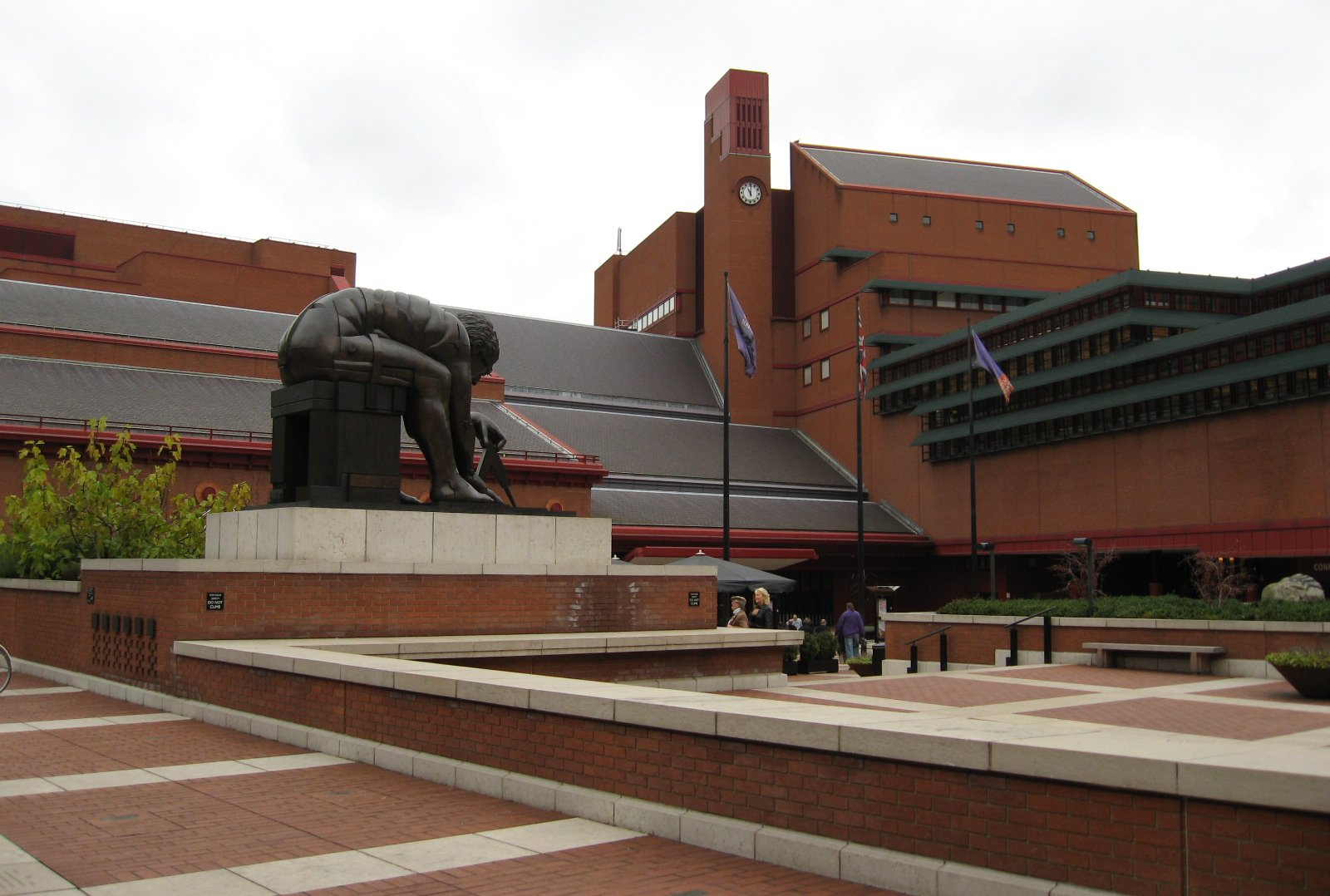
The British Library in London

According to Bentley the codex is "the oldest and best in the world". Bentley assumed that by supplementing this manuscript with readings from other manuscripts and from the Latin Vulgate, he could triangulate back to the single recension which he presumed existed at the time of the First Council of Nicaea. Wettstein highly esteemed the codex in 1730, but changed his opinion in 1751 and was no longer a great admirer of it. He came to the conviction that Athos was the place of its origin, not Alexandria. Michaelis also did not esteem it highly, either on account of its internal excellence or the value of its readings. The principal charge which has been produced against the manuscript, and which had been urged by Wettstein, was it had been altered from the Latin version. Michaelis countered that the transcriber who lived in Egypt would not have altered the Greek text from a Latin version, because Egypt belonged to the Greek diocese, and Latin was not understood there. Woide, who defended the Greek manuscripts in general, and the Codex Alexandrinus in particular, from the charge of having been corrupted from the Latin, discerned two hands in the New Testament.

Griesbach agreed with Woide and expanded on Michaelis' point of view. If this manuscript has been corrupted from a version, it is more reasonable to suspect the Coptic, the version of the country in which it was written. Between this manuscript and both the Coptic and Syriac versions there is a remarkable coincidence. According to Griesbach the manuscript follows three different editions: the Byzantine in the Gospels, the Western in the Acts and General epistles, and the Alexandrian in the Pauline epistles. Griesbach designated the codex by letter A.

Tregelles explained the origin of the Arabic inscription, on which Cyril's statement appears to rest, by remarking that the text of the New Testament in the manuscript begins with Matthew 25:6, this lesson (Matthew 25:1–13) being that appointed by the Greek Church for the festival of St. Thecla.

== Importance ==
It was the first manuscript of great importance and antiquity of which any extensive use was made by textual critics, but the value of the codex was differently appreciated by different writers in the past. Wettstein created a modern system of catalogization of the New Testament manuscripts. Codex Alexandrinus received symbol A and opened the list of the NT uncial manuscripts. Wettstein announced in his Prolegomena ad Novi Testamenti Graeci (1730) that Codex A is the oldest and the best manuscript of the New Testament, and should be the basis in every reconstruction of the New Testament text. Codex Alexandrinus became a basis for criticizing the Textus Receptus (Wettstein, Woide, Griesbach).

== See also ==
- Biblical manuscript
- List of New Testament uncials
- Textual criticism
