= Codex Laudianus =

Uncial 08
- New Testament manuscript
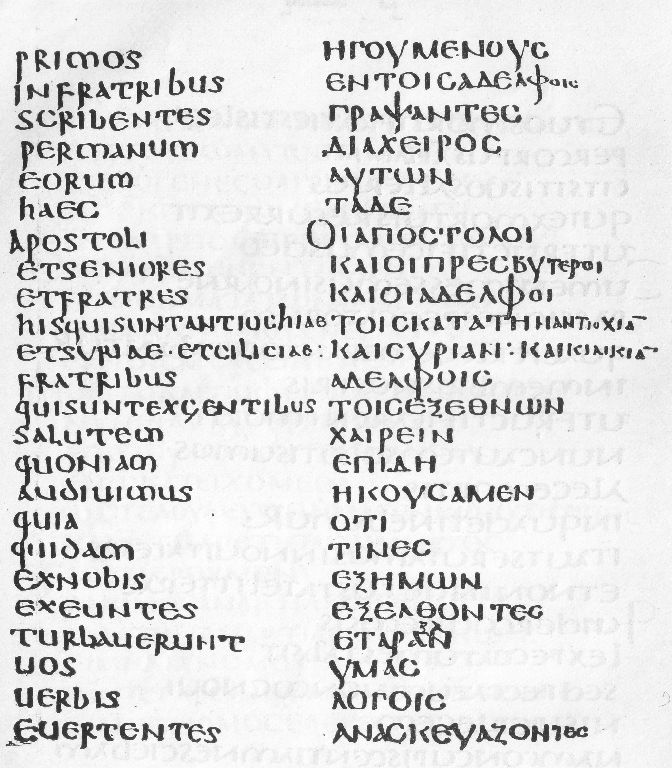
- Page from Codex Laudianus (Acts 15:22-24)
- Name: Laudianus
- Sign: E^{a}
- Text: Book of Acts
- Date: c. ~550
- Script: Latin - Greek diglot
- Now at: Bodleian Library, Oxford
- Size: 27 × 22 cm (10.6 × 8.7 in)
- Type: Western text-type
- Category: II
- Note: It contains Acts 8:37

Codex Laudianus, designated by E^{a} or 08 (in the Gregory-Aland numbering), α 1001 (von Soden), called Laudianus after the former owner, Archbishop William Laud. It is a diglot Latin — Greek uncial manuscript of the New Testament, palaeographically assigned to the 6th century. The manuscript contains the Acts of the Apostles.

== Description ==
The manuscript is a diglot, with Greek and Latin in parallel columns on the same page, with the Latin in the left-hand column. The codex contains 227 parchment leaves, sized 27 × 22 cm (10.6 × 8.7 in), with almost the complete text of the Book of Acts (lacuna in 26:29-28:26). It is the earliest known manuscript to contain Acts 8:37.

The text is written in two columns per page, 24 and more lines per page. It is arranged in very short lines of only one to three words each. The text is written colonmetrically.

== Text ==
The Greek text of this codex exhibits a mixture of text-types, usually the Byzantine, but there are many Western and some Alexandrian readings. According to Kurt Aland it agrees with the Byzantine text-type 36 times, and 21 times with the Byzantine when it has the same reading as the Alexandrian text. It agrees 22 times with the Alexandrian text against the Byzantine. It has 22 independent or distinctive readings (Sonderlesarten). Aland placed it in Category II.

It contains Acts 8:37, as do the manuscripts 323, 453, 945, 1739, 1891, 2818, and several others. Most other Greek manuscripts do not contain Acts 8:37

In Acts 12:25, the Latin text of the codex reads from Jerusalem to Antioch, along with 429, 945, 1739, p, syr^{p}, cop^{sa} geo; The Majority Text reads εις Ιερουσαλημ (to Jerusalem);

In Acts 16:10, it reads θεος along with P^{74}, Sinaiticus, Alexandrinus, Vaticanus, Ephraemi, 044, 33, 81, 181, 326, 630, 945, 1739, ar, e, l, vg, cop^{bo}, geo; other manuscripts read κυριος - D, P, 049, 056, 0142, 88, 104, 330, 436, 451, 614, 629, 1241, 1505, 1877, 2127, 2412, 2492, 2495, Byz, c, d, gig, syr^{p,h}, cop^{sa}.

In Acts 18:26, it reads την οδον του κυριου along with manuscripts 1505, 2495, and lectionary 598.

In Acts 20:28, it reads του κυριου (of the Lord) along with the manuscripts: Papyrus 74, C*, D, Ψ, 33, 36, 453, 945, 1739, and 1891. (Note: For other variants of this verse see: Textual variants in the Acts of the Apostles.)

== History ==
It was probably written in Sardinia, during the Byzantine occupation, and therefore after 534 (terminus a quo). It was written before 716 (terminus ad quem), as it was used by Beda Venerabilis in his Expositio Actuum Apostolorum Retractata.

"It was brought to England probably by Theodore of Tarsus, Archbishop of Canterbury, in 668, or by Ceolfrid, Abbot of Wearmouth and Jarrow, in the early part of the eighth century. It was probably deposited in one of the great monasteries in the north of England." It probably came to the continent with English missionaries in the 8th century and came into the possession of Hornbach Abbey in the Rhineland.

In the Thirty Years' War, it came into the possession of William Laud, who donated the manuscript to the Bodleian Library in Oxford in 1636, where it is still located (shelfmark: MS. Laud Gr. 35).

Thomas Hearne published a transcription of its text in 1715, but not a very good one. This was followed by a transcription done by Hansell in 1864, and then by Constantin von Tischendorf in 1870.

The manuscript was examined by Johann Jakob Griesbach, Ropes, Motzo, Poole, Clark, Lagrange, and Walther.

== See also ==
- List of New Testament uncials
- List of New Testament Latin manuscripts
- Textual criticism
