= Lectionary 59 =

Lectionary ℓ 59
- New Testament manuscript
- Text: Apostolos
- Date: 12th-century
- Script: Greek
- Now at: State Historical Museum
- Size: 32 cm by 23.8 cm

Lectionary 59, designated by siglum ℓ 59 (in the Gregory-Aland numbering), is a Greek manuscript of the New Testament, on parchment leaves. Palaeographically it has been assigned to the 12th century. Formerly it was labelled as Apost. 13.

== Description ==
The codex contains lessons from the Acts of the Apostles and Epistles. It is a lectionary (Apostolos). It is written in Greek minuscule letters, on 311 parchment leaves (32 cm by 23.8 cm). Written in two columns per page, in 23 lines per page.

It contains verse of Acts 8:37.

== History ==
The manuscript once belonged to the Iviron monastery at Athos. It was renovated by Joakim, a monk, in A. D. 1525. It was brought to Moscow in 1655. The manuscript was examined by Matthaei, cited by Tregelles as Frag. Mosq.

The manuscript is cited in the critical editions of the Greek New Testament (UBS3).

Currently the codex is located in the State Historical Museum, (V. 21, S. 4) in Moscow.

== See also ==
- List of New Testament lectionaries
- Biblical manuscript
- Textual criticism
