= Papyrus 56 =

Papyrus 𝔓^{56}
- New Testament manuscript
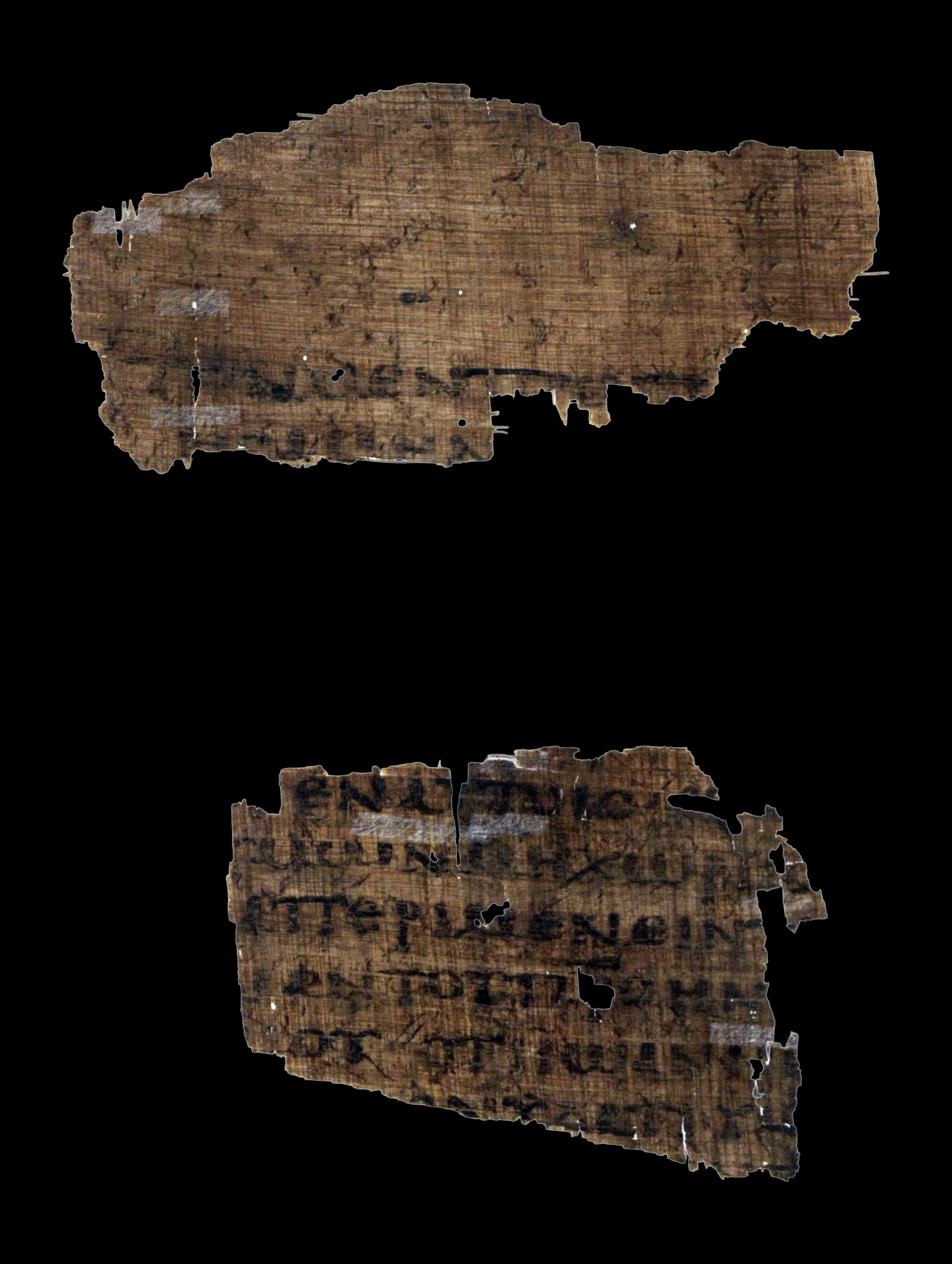
- Fragment 1 recto Acts 1:1, 1:4-6
- Name: Papyrus Vindobonensis Graecus 19918
- Text: Acts 1 †
- Date: 5th / 6th century
- Script: Greek
- Found: Egypt
- Now at: Österreichische Nationalbibliothek
- Cite: P. Sanz, Mitteilungen aus der Papyrussammlung de österreichischen Nationalbibliothek in Wien, N.S., IV (Baden: 1946), pp. 65-66.
- Type: Alexandrian text-type
- Category: II

Papyrus 56 (in the Gregory-Aland numbering), signed by 𝔓^{56}, is an early copy of the New Testament in Greek. It is a papyrus manuscript of the Acts of the Apostles, it contains only Acts 1:1.4-5.7.10-11.

The manuscript palaeographically has been assigned to the 5th century (or 6th century).

The Greek text of this codex is a representative of the Alexandrian text-type. Aland placed it in Category II.

It is currently housed at the Papyrus Collection of the Austrian National Library (Pap. Vindob. G. 19918) in Vienna.

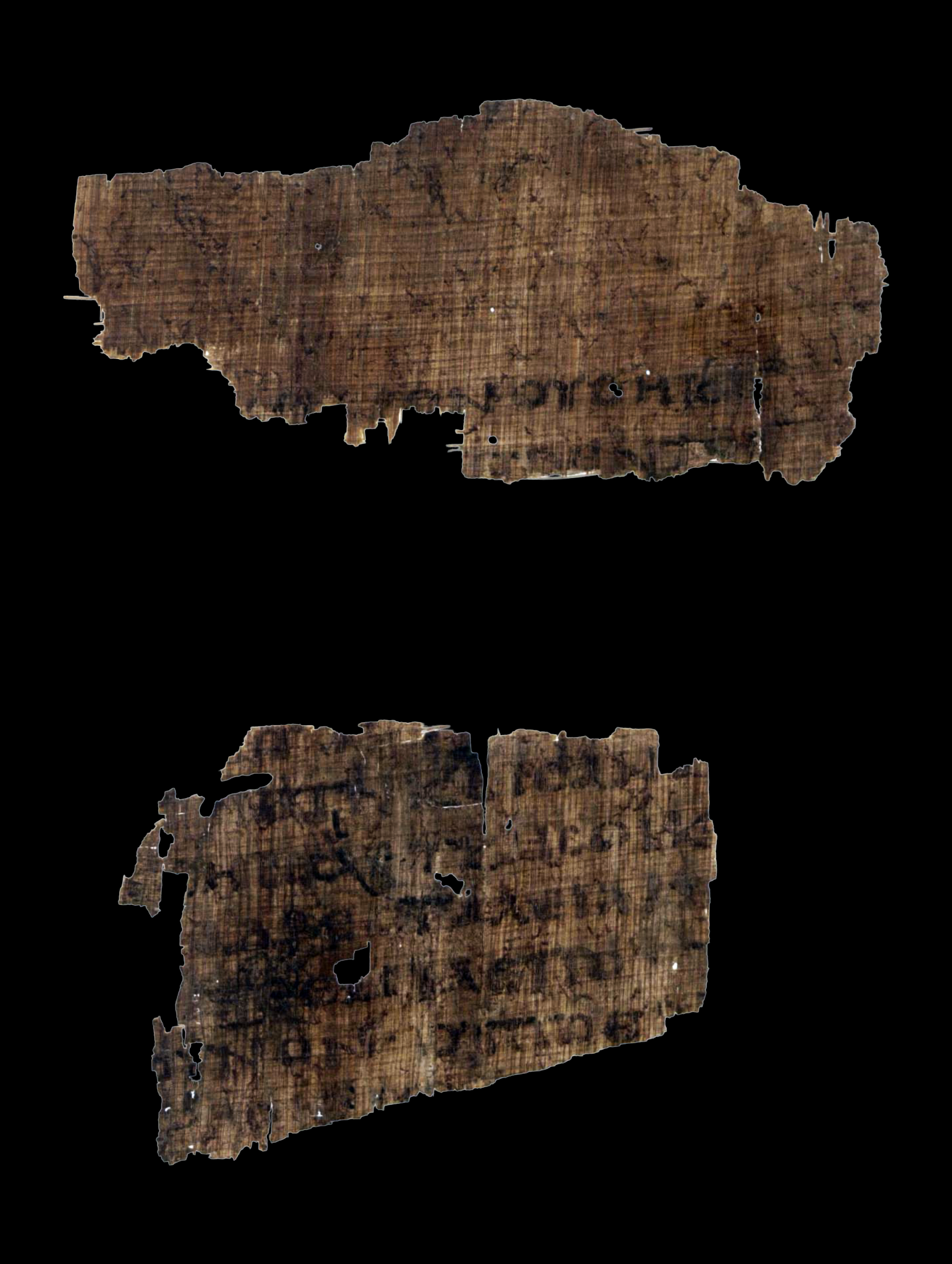
Fragment 1 verso Acts 1:7, 1:11

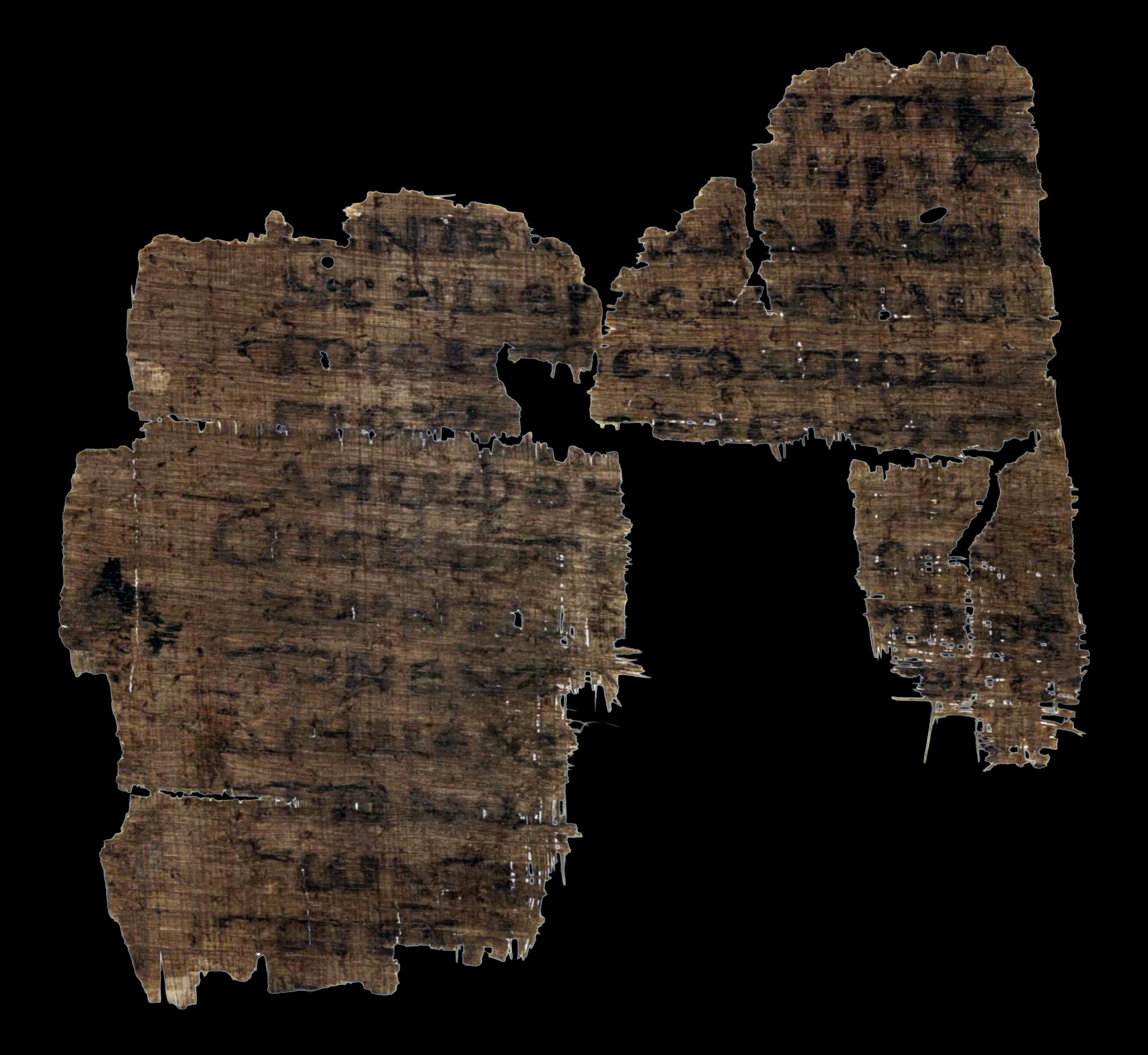
Fragment 2 recto Acts 1:1-5

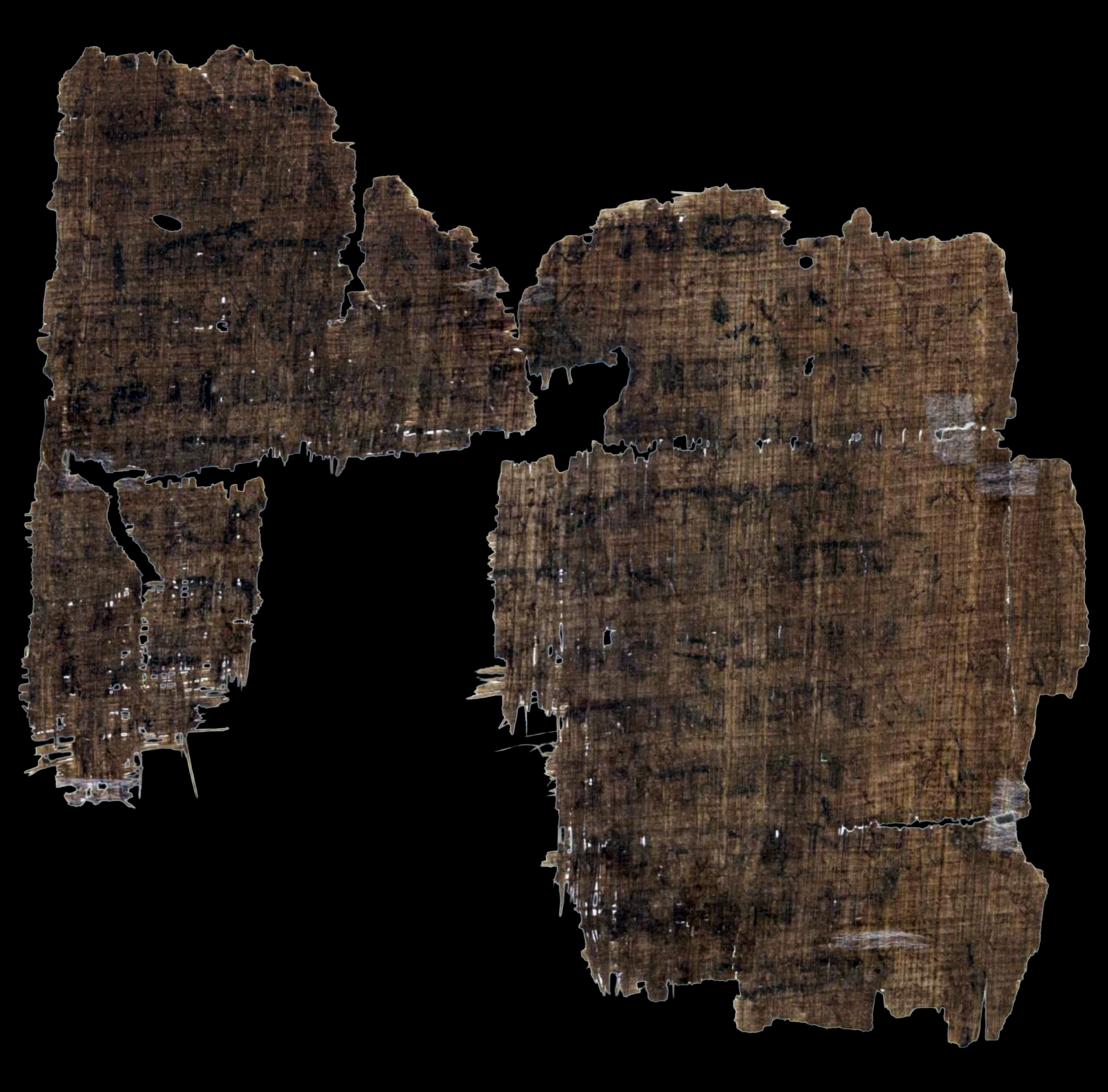
Fragment 2 verso Acts 1:7-11

== See also ==
- List of New Testament papyri
