= Papyrus 74 =

Papyrus 𝔓^{74}
- New Testament manuscript
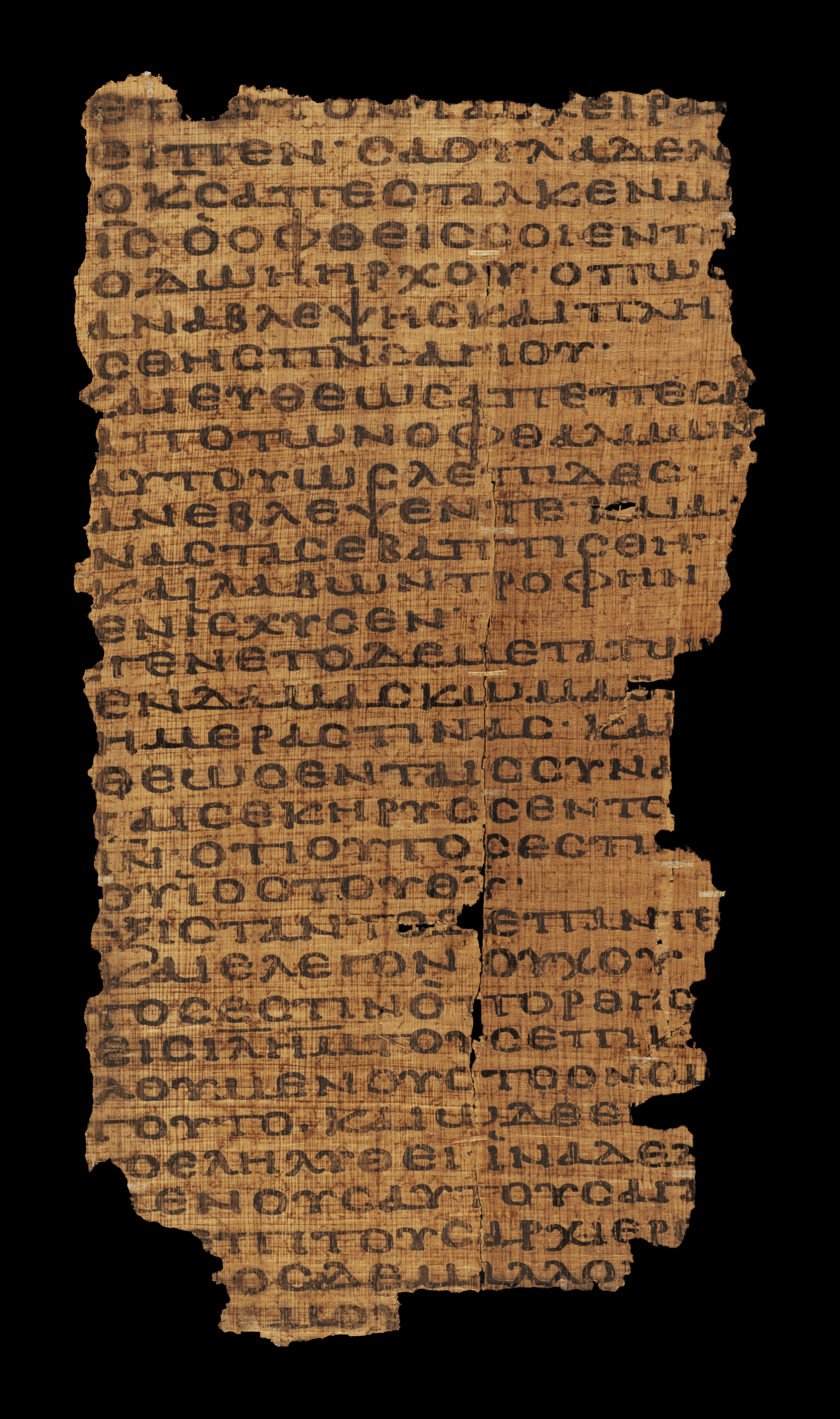
- Bodmer Library Ms 17 fol 12 verso, Acts 9, 17-22 in
- Name: P. Bodmer XVII
- Text: Acts †; Catholic epistles †
- Date: c. 600-700
- Script: Greek
- Found: Egypt
- Now at: Bibliotheca Bodmeriana
- Cite: Rudolf Kasser, Papyrus Bodmer XVII: Actes des Apôtres, Epîtres de Jacques, Pierre, Jean et Jude (Cologny/Geneva: 1961)
- Size: 33 by 21 cm
- Type: Alexandrian text-type
- Category: I
- Note: Acts 27:14-21 shown

Papyrus 74 (in the Gregory-Aland numbering), designated by 𝔓^{74}, is a copy of the New Testament in Greek. It is a papyrus manuscript of the Acts of the Apostles and Catholic epistles with lacunae. The manuscript paleographically had been assigned to the 7th century.

== Description ==
Contents

The surviving texts are verses: Acts 1:2–28:31 †; James 1:1–5:20 †; 1 Peter 1:1–2, 7–8, 13, 19–20, 25; 2:6–7, 11–12, 18, 24; 3:4–5; 2 Peter 2:21; 3:4, 11, 16; 1 John 1:1, 6; 2:1–2, 7, 13–14, 18–19, 25–26; 3:1–2, 8, 14, 19–20; 4:1, 6–7, 12, 18–19; 5:3–4, 9–10, 17; 2 John 1, 6–7, 13; 3 John 6, 12; Jude 3, 7, 11–12, 16, 24.

Text

Despite the late date, it is an important manuscript and excellent witness for the book of Acts.

The Greek text of this codex is a representative of the Alexandrian text-type. Aland ascribed it as a "strict text", and placed it in Category I.

Acts 12:25 it reads εξ Ιερουσαλημ (from Jerusalem) along with A, 33, 69, 630, 2127; majority reads εις Ιερουσαλημ (to Jerusalem);

It does not contain Acts 15:34 as codices Sinaiticus, Alexandrinus, Vaticanus, E, Ψ, Byz.

Acts 20:28 it reads του κυριου (of the Lord) – A C* D E Ψ 33 36 453 945 1739 1891, instead of the Alexandrian του Θεου (of the God), or the Eastern Roman (Byzantine) του κυριου και του Θεου (of the Lord and God).
Acts 27:16 – καυδα (name of island), this reading is supported only by Vaticanus, 1175, Old-Latin version, Vulgate, and Peshitta.

Present location

It is currently housed at the Bibliotheca Bodmeriana (P. Bodmer XVII) in Cologny.

== See also ==
- List of New Testament papyri
- Bodmer Papyri
