= Minuscule 2818 =

- New Testament manuscript
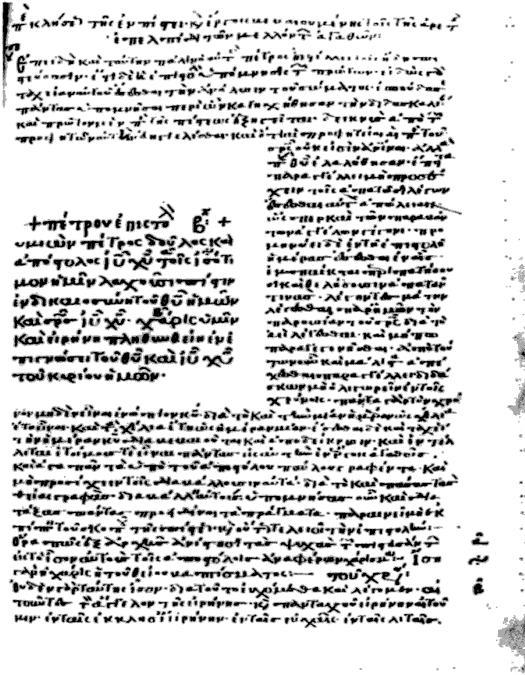
- 2 Peter 1:1-2 with a commentary
- Text: Acts, Catholic epistles
- Date: 12th-century
- Script: Greek
- Now at: New College
- Size: 26 cm by 20.5 cm
- Type: Western
- Category: II/III

Minuscule 2818 (in the Gregory-Aland numbering), A^{πρ20} (von Soden). Formerly it was labelled as 36^{aK} in all catalogues, but it was renumbered by Aland, because two manuscripts had number 36 (36^{e} and 36^{a}). It is a Greek minuscule manuscript of the New Testament, dated palaeographically to the 12th-century.

== Description ==
The codex contains the text of the Acts of the Apostles and Catholic epistles on 245 parchment leaves with a commentary. The text is written in one column per page, 39 lines per page, the pages are 26 by 20.5 cm. The text is written on a parchment in minuscule.

It contains Prolegomena. The text is divided according to the κεφαλαια (chapters), whose numbers are given at the margin, and their τιτλοι (titles of chapters) at the top of the pages. The text of the Acts of the Apostles is surrounded by a Catena of Church Fathers. It contains Martyrium Pauli.

== Text ==
Aland placed the Greek text of the Acts in Category II. The text of the Catholic epistles is in Category III.

In Acts 8:37 it has a text supported by the manuscripts: Codex Basilensis, 323, 453, 945, 1739, 1891, and several others.

In Acts 8:39 it has an addition αγιον επεπεσεν επι τον ευνουχον, αγγελος δε (holy [spirit] fell on the eunuch, and an angel). This reading is supported by the manuscripts Codex Alexandrinus, 323, 453, 945, 1739, 1891, and several others.

In Acts 12:18 it reads μεγας for ουκ ολιγος, the reading is supported by 94, 307, 431, 1175, cop^{sa}, arm.

In Acts 20:28 it reads του κυριου (of the Lord) together with the manuscripts Papyrus 74 C* D E Ψ 33 453 945 1739 1891. (Note: For another variants of this verse see: Textual variants in the Acts of the Apostles.)

== History of the codex ==
The manuscript was cited in Walton's Polyglott, enumerated by John Mill (Novum Testamentum, Prolegomena § 1390), examined by Wettstein, and edited by Cramer in 1838. It was cited by Novum Testamentum Graece (Nestle-Aland 27) in Acts 15:28; 21:25.

The codex is located now at the New College (58), in Oxford.

== See also ==
- List of New Testament minuscules (2001–)
- Biblical manuscript
- Textual criticism
