= Minuscule 322 =

- New Testament manuscript
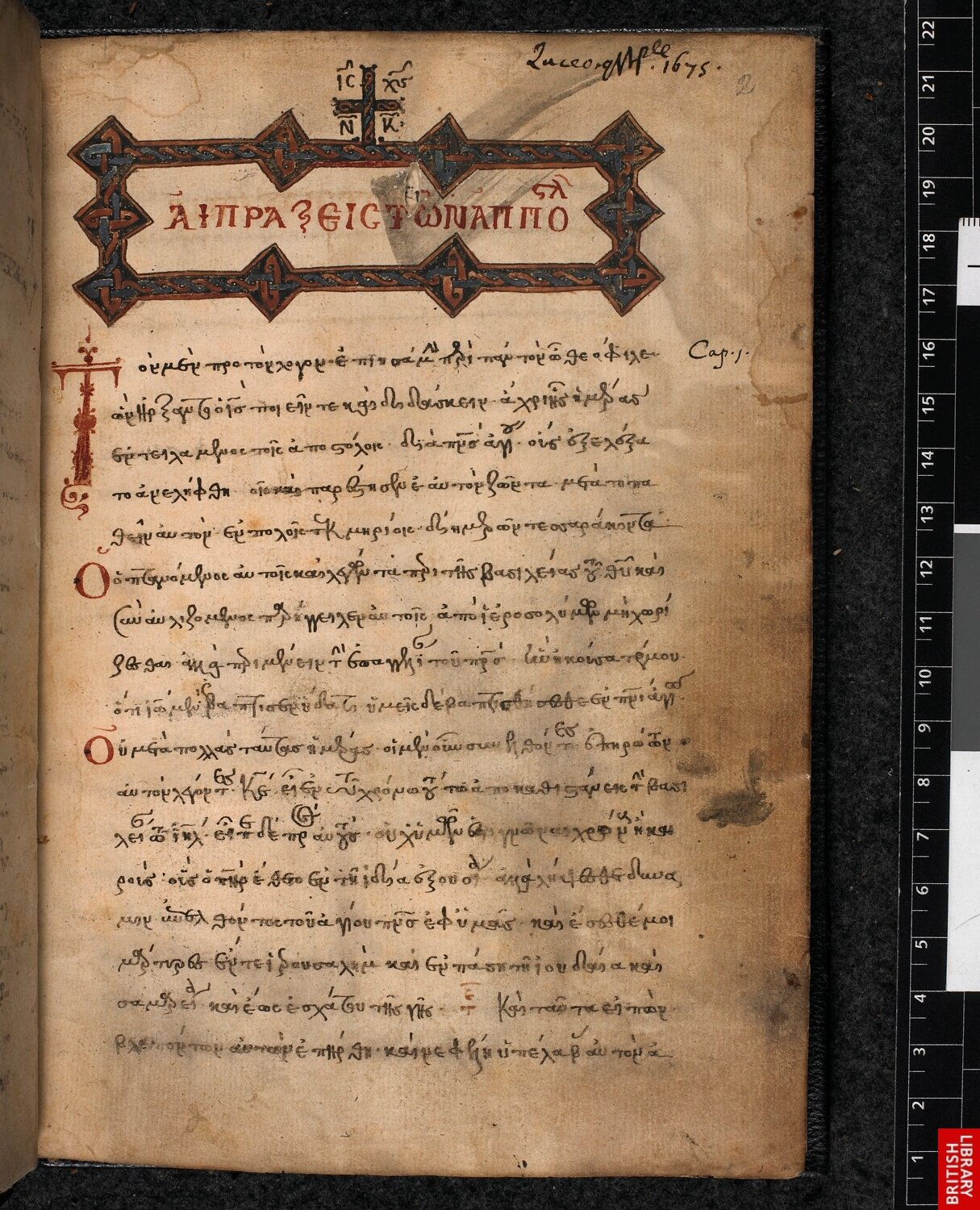
- The first page of the codex; initial 'T' with geometric and decoration.
- Name: Harley MS 5620
- Text: Acts, Paul
- Date: 15th century
- Script: Greek
- Found: John Covel
- Now at: British Library
- Size: 21 cm by 15 cm
- Type: Alexandrian text-type
- Category: II, III

Minuscule 322 (in the Gregory-Aland numbering), α 550 (Soden), is a Greek minuscule manuscript of the New Testament, on paper. Palaeographically it has been assigned to the 15th century. Formerly it was labelled by 27^{a} and 33^{p}.

== Description ==
The codex contains the text of the Acts of the Apostles, Catholic epistles, and Pauline epistles on 134 paper leaves (21 cm by 15 cm). The text is written in one column per page, in 22 lines per page. There are no chapter divisions made by prima manu, the writing is small, and abbreviated.

It has decorated headpieces and initial letters.

== Text ==
The Greek text of the codex is a representative of the Alexandrian text-type. Aland assigned it to Category II in Catholic epistles, and to Category III elsewhere. Textually it is very close to the codex 323 (sister manuscript).

In Acts 8:39 it has addition αγιον επεπεσεν επι τον ευνουχον, αγγελος δε (holy fell on the eunuch, and an angel). This reading is supported by the manuscripts Codex Alexandrinus, 323, 453, 945, 1739, 1891, 2818 and several others.

== History ==
The manuscript belonged to John Drakos in 1654. John Covel (1637-1722), British chaplain in Constantinople, purchased it in Adrianopol in 1675 (together with codex 321). It later belonged to Robert Harley. In 1753 it was purchased with all of his collection by the British Museum.

Formerly it was labelled by 27^{a} and 33^{p}. In 1908 Gregory gave the number 322 to it.

It was examined by Mill, Griesbach, and Bloomfeld. C. R. Gregory saw it in 1883.

The manuscript is currently housed at the British Library (Harley MS 5620).

== See also ==
- List of New Testament minuscules
- Biblical manuscript
- Textual criticism
