= Minuscule 323 =

- New Testament manuscript
- Name: Codex Genevensis
- Text: Acts, Paul
- Date: 12th century
- Script: Greek
- Now at: Bibliothèque de Genève
- Size: 13.5 cm by 10.2 cm
- Type: Alexandrian text-type
- Category: II, III
- Note: Family 1739

Minuscule 323 (in the Gregory-Aland numbering), α 157 (Soden), is a Greek minuscule manuscript of the New Testament, on parchment. Palaeographically it has been assigned to the 12th century. Formerly it was designated by 29^{a} and 35^{p}.

== Description ==
The codex contains the text of the Acts of the Apostles, Catholic epistles, and Pauline epistles on 374 parchment leaves (13.5 cm by 10.2 cm) with some lacunae. The text is written in one column per page, in 18 lines per page. The texts of Acts 1:1-8; 2:36-45 were supplied by a later hand. There are other small defects. It is beautifully but carelessly written, without subscriptions at the end of books.

== Text ==
The Greek text of the codex is a representative of the Alexandrian text-type, but the Byzantine element is very strong. Aland assigned it to Category II in Catholic epistles, and to Category III elsewhere. Textually it is very close to the codex 322, as a sister manuscript.

It is a member of the textual family 1739.

In Acts 8:37 it has an additional verse together with the manuscripts Codex Laudianus, 453, 945, 1739, 1891, 2818 (formerly 36^{a}), and several others.

In Acts 8:39 it has addition πνεῦμα ἅγιον ἐπέπεσεν ἐπὶ τὸν εὐνοῦχον, ἄγγελος δέ κυρίου ἥρπασεν τὸν Φίλιππον (the holy spirit fell on the eunuch, and an angel caught up Philip). This reading is supported by the manuscripts Codex Alexandrinus, 453, 945, 1739, 1891, 2818, it^{p}, vg, syr^{h}, and several others.

== History ==
The manuscript was brought from Greece. It was examined by Mill, Griesbach, and Scholz. C. R. Gregory saw it in 1883.

Formerly it was designated by 29^{a} and 35^{p}. In 1908 Gregory gave the number 323 to it.

The manuscript is currently housed in the Bibliothèque de Genève (Gr. 20) in Geneva.

== See also ==
- List of New Testament minuscules
- Biblical manuscript
- Textual criticism
