= Papyrus 141 =

Papyrus manuscript

- New Testament manuscript
- Name: P. Oxy 5478
- Sign: 𝔓^{141}
- Text: Luke 2:32-34, 40-42; 24:22-28, 30-38
- Date: c. 200-300
- Script: Greek
- Found: Oxyrhynchus
- Now at: University of Oxford, Sackler Library, Oxford, England
- Cite: Griffin, B.W. and Blumell, L.H., The Oxyrhynchus Papyri, vol. 85, no. 5478, Egypt Exploration Society: London, England, 2020.
- Size: 8.3 x 7 mm; 2.9 x 17.8 mm
- Type: Alexandrian Text-Type

Papyrus 141 (designated as 𝔓^{141} in the Gregory-Aland numbering system) is what remains of an early copy of the New Testament in Greek. It is a papyrus manuscript of Luke. The text survives on two disparate fragments of the same codex, one from chapter 2 and one from chapter 24. The manuscript has been assigned paleographically to the 3rd century.

== Location ==
𝔓^{141} is housed at the Sackler Library (P. Oxy 5478) at the University of Oxford.

== Textual Reconstruction ==
Fr. 1

. . . . . . [ειϲ] απ̣οκαλυ̣[ψιν εθνων και δο] (2:32)
ξαν λαου ϲου [Ιϲραηλ και ην ο] 33
π̅η̅ρ̣̅ αυτου κα̣ι̣η[μ̅[̅η̅ρ̅ θαυμαζον]
τεϲ επι τοιϲ λαλουμ[ενοιϲ περι]
5 αυτου και ηυλογηϲ̣ε[̣ ν αυτουϲ] 34
Cυμεων και ειπεν προ[ϲ
. . . . . .
ε]κ̣[ρ]α̣[ταιουτο] 40
[πληρουμενο]ν ϲοΦια και χαρ[ιϲ]
[θ̅υ̅ ην ε]π̣ α̣υ̣το̣v και επορευοντ̣[ο] 41
[οι γονε]ιϲ̣ αυτου κατ’ ετοϲ ειϲ Ϊ[ε]
5 [ρουϲαλ]ημ’ τη εορτη του παϲχ[α]ετη
[και ο]τ̣ε εγενετο αυτω ^{ετη}δωδεκα [ 42

Fr. 2
. . . . . . .
[εξ] η̣μω̣[ν εξεϲτηϲαν ημαϲ γενο] (24:22)
[με]ν̣αι̣ορ̣θ̣[ριναι επι το μνημειον]
[κ]α̣ι̣ μη ε[̣ υρουϲαι το ϲωμα αυτου] 23
5 [η]λ̣θον [λεγουϲαι και οπταϲιαν αγ]
[γε]λ̣ων ε[̣ ωρακεναι οι λεγουϲιν αυ]
[το]ν ζην [και απηλθον τινεϲ των] 24
[ϲυν] η̣μιν [επι το μνημειον και ευ]
[ρο]ν ουτω[ϲ καθωϲ και αι γυναικεϲ]
10 [ει]π̣ον α[υτον δε ουκ ειδον και αυ] 25
[το]ϲ ειπε[ν προϲ αυτουϲ ω ανοητοι]
[και] βρα[δειϲ τη καρδια του πιϲτευ]
[ει]ν̣επι π[αϲιν οιϲ ελαληϲαν οι προ]
[Φ]η̣ται ο̣[υχι ταυτα εδει παθειν] 26
15 [το]ν̣ χ̅ρ̅ν̅ κα[ι ειϲελθειν ειϲ την δο]
[ξα]ν αυτου κ̣[αι αρξαμενοϲ απο Μωυ] 27
[ϲε]ω̣ϲ και α̣[πο παντων των προ]
[Φη]τ̣ων διε̣[̣ ρμηνευϲεν αυτοιϲ]
[εν π]αϲαιϲ τα[ιϲ γραΦαιϲ τα περι εαυτου]
20 [και] η̣γγιϲαν̣[ειϲ την κωμην ου] 28
[επορ]ευοντο̣[και αυτοϲ προϲεποιη]
[ϲατ]ο̣ πορρω[τερον
. . . . . . . . . . . . .αρτ]ο̣ν [ηυλο] (30)
[γηϲεν και κλαϲαϲ επε]δ[ιδου αυ]
[τοιϲ αυτων δε διηνοι]χθη[ϲαν] 31
[οι οΦθαλμοι και επεγν]ω̣ϲαν̣[αυ]
5 [τον και αυτοϲ αΦαντ]οϲ εγε[νετο]
[απ αυτων και ειπα]ν̣ προ[ϲ αλ] 32
[ληλουϲ ουχι η καρδι]α̣ ημω̣[ν καιο]
[μενη ην εν ημιν εν] τ̣η οδω̣ [ωϲ]
[διηνοιγεν ημιν τα]ϲ̣ γρα̣Φ[αϲ]
10 [και αναϲταντεϲ αυτ]η̣ τ̣η̣ ω̣[ρα] 33
[υπεϲτρεψαν ειϲ Ιερου]ϲ̣αλ[ημ]
[και ευρον ϲυνηθροιϲμ]ενο[υϲ τουϲ]
[ι̅α̅ και τουϲ ϲυν αυτοιϲ] λ̣εγον[ταϲ] 34
[οτι οντωϲ ηγερθη ο κ̅]̅ϲ̣̅ κα[ι ω]
15 [Φθη Cιμωνι και αυτοι] εξ[ηγουν] 35
[το τα εν τη οδω και ω]ϲ ε[γνω]
[ϲθη αυτοιϲ εν τη κλ]α̣ϲε[ι του]
[αρτου ταυτα δε αυτων] λα[λουν] 36
[των αυτοϲ εϲτη εν μ]εϲ[ω αυ]
20 [των και λεγει αυτοιϲ] ει[ρη]
[νη υμιν πτοηθεντεϲ δ]ε κ̣[αι] 37
[εμΦοβοι γενομενοι εδ]ο̣κ[ουν π̅ν̅α̅]
[θεωρειν και ειπεν αυ]το̣[ιϲ 38
. . . . . .

== Textual variants ==
- 2:33 𝔓^{141} supports the reading πατηρ with 01 03 05 019 032 ƒ1 131 700 1241, compared to the majority reading of ιωσηφ.
- 2:34 𝔓^{141} reads ηυλογηϲεν with 01 032 036 047 349 579 713 1510 2542, compared to the standard reading of ευλογηϲεν.
- 2:42 𝔓^{141} contains the plus αυτω prior to ετη (although ετη was added supralinearly as a prima manu correction) along with 05, compared to the standard reading ετων and the deviant reading οτων of 01.
- 24:23 𝔓^{141} has the standard reading ηλθον as compared to the orthographic variant ηλθαν of 𝔓^{75} and 03.
- 24:24 𝔓^{141} evidently had the standard reading of καθωϲ και as compared to just καθωϲ of 𝔓^{75} and 03, and just ωϲ of 05.
- 24:28 𝔓^{141} has the standard reading of ηγγιϲαν compared to ηγγικαν of 𝔓^{75} and 03.
- 24:32 𝔓^{141} lacks space for about six letters in the lacuna preceding τ̣η οδω, as compared to ωϲ ελαλει ημιν εν of 𝔓^{75} and 03, the majority reading εν ημιν ωϲ ελαλει ημιν εν being too long to fit. Griffin reconstructs the reading (based on its support in the Latin manuscripts a b ff^{2} l r^{1}) as εν ημιν, meaning that the words for "as he was speaking with us" in the Alexandrian base text were replaced with "in us" in alignment with the majority reading.
- 24:33 Griffin views the lacuna as having been too long for the Alexandrian (𝔓^{75} 01 03 05 33) reading ϲυνηθροιϲμενουϲ and reconstructs the text as having contained the majority reading ηθροιϲμενουϲ.
- 24:36 Griffin reconstructs the text, on the basis of line spacing between the extant sequences εϲ on line 19 and ει on line 20 of the second fragment's verso, as having contained the standard reading και λεγει αυτοιϲ, which on the basis of its absence in 05 (and the Latin manuscripts e a b d ff^{2} l r^{1}) was omitted from the edited texts of Westcott and Hort 1881 and Michael Holmes 2010.

== See also ==
- List of New Testament papyri
