= Minuscule 1582 =

Greek minuscule manuscript of the four Gospels

- New Testament manuscript
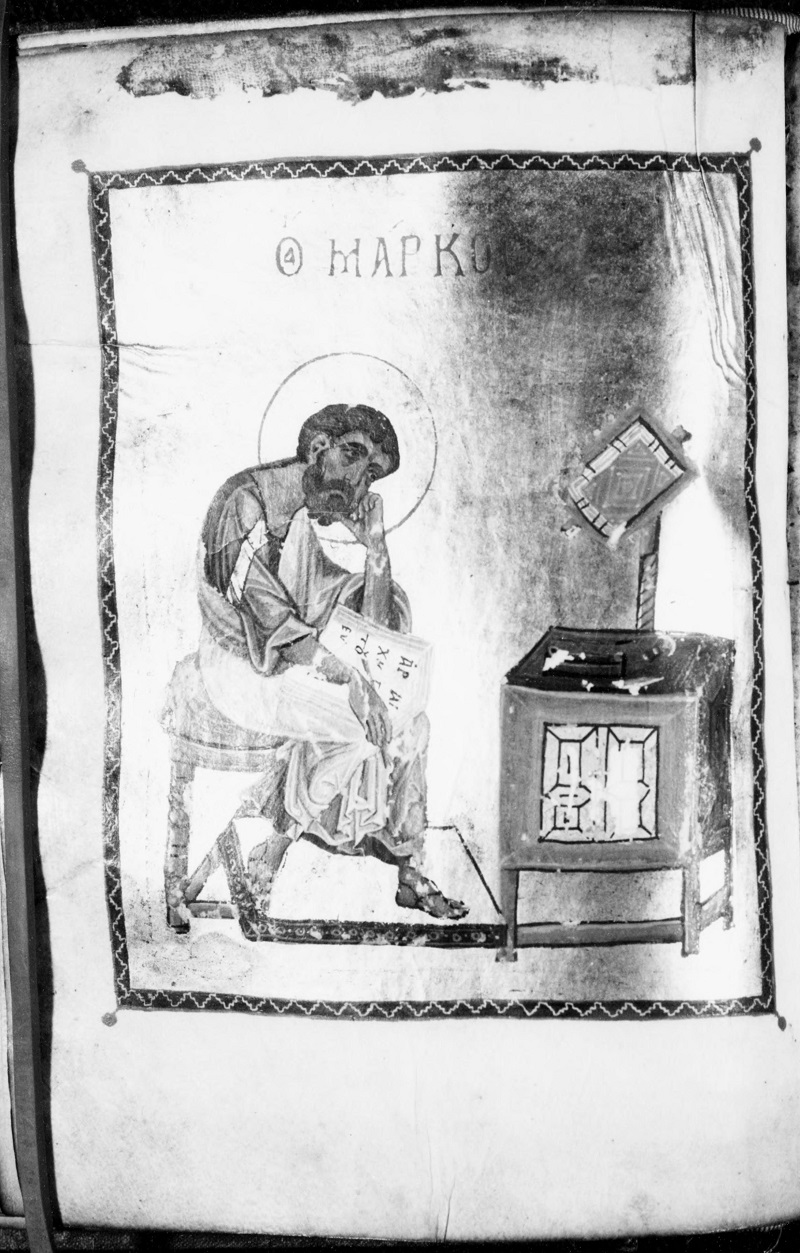
- Mark the Evangelist, before the start of his gospel
- Text: Gospels
- Date: 948
- Script: Greek
- Cite: Anderson, Amy S. (2004). The Textual Tradition of the Gospels: Family 1 in Matthew. Leiden; Boston: Brill. ISBN 9004135928.
- Type: Caesarean text-type
- Note: Family 1

Minuscule 1582 is a Greek minuscule manuscript of the four New Testament Gospels, written on parchment. It is designated by the siglum 1582 in the Gregory-Aland numbering of New Testament manuscripts, and ε 183 in the von Soden numbering of New Testament manuscripts. It is dated by a colophon to 948. The manuscript was written by a monk named Ephraim, of which there are at least four other manuscripts known to have been written by him, including another New Testament manuscript, minuscule 1739. It is considered to be part of a group of manuscripts known as Family 1 (ƒ^{1}) as a leading member, with a very similar text to minuscule 1.

According to biblical scholar Bruce Metzger, it contains "an ancient and valuable text of the Gospels", and its text and marginal notes are closely related to the Greek text used by the early church father Origen.

The manuscript contains several colophons, and had several pages replaced in antiquity. Four full-page Evangelist portraits are probably later additions to the codex; there are also some decorative illuminations. Though written in the 10th century, the manuscript and the special text it contained only came to scholarly notice in the early 20th century. The manuscript is now in the Vatopedi Monastery on Mount Athos, in Greece.

== Description ==
The manuscript is a codex (precursor to the modern book format), containing the near-complete text of the four Gospels written on 290 parchment leaves (sized 21.2 x 16.5 cm). It is missing Matthew 22:39-23:3. The text is written in one column per page, with 20 lines each page. The writing area comprises around 14.2 x 8 cm of each page. The parchment is white, of medium thickness, and the ink used is reddish-brown for the majority of the text, with gold ink used for the initial letters of each Gospel. Scholar K. W. Kim described the manuscript as "beautifully written". The manuscript was rebound at least twice, the latest being in the 19th century. The last leaf (known as a folio) was apparently damaged in antiquity, and replaced with a new one which includes the main colophon giving the manuscript's initial date. Three more colophons appear on this replacement page, and two further colophons are written on the manuscript's first page. Two further folios were either damaged or removed (folio 13 and 60), with only folio 13 being replaced.

Four Evangelist portraits appear before their respective Gospels; however, it would appear these were not original to the codex, but added later. In Ephraim's numbering of the folios, they do not include the portraits, but a later numbering does. It's also possible they could've been taken from another manuscript, and added either after Ephraim had numbered the folios and before the initial binding, or included at a later rebinding. The headpieces which precede the initial verse of each Gospel are original to the codex.

Breathing marks (utilised to designate vowel emphasis) and accents (used to indicate voiced pitch changes) were added by the initial copyist Ephraim, though many were changed by a later corrector. This corrector was the same person who replaced the damaged folios, and who also added numerous corrections to the main text, usually either writing the corrected reading supralinearly (above the line), though sometimes between words and others were inserted in the margin. There are a total of 167 corrected readings in the Gospel of Matthew portion, 157 of which bring the text closer to the majority of other manuscripts. The manuscript contains several marginal notes by both the copyist Ephraim and the later corrector. There are 17 in the Gospel of Matthew, 11 in the Gospel of Mark, 5 in the Gospel of Luke, and 6 in the Gospel of John.

After Mark 16:8 is a colophon stating many other manuscripts finish at the end of this verse, but that others also contain the verses following (16:9-20). Accordingly scholars use this along with other arguments as evidence that the original Gospel of Mark ended at verse 8, with verses 9-20 being added on later. This colophon is also contained in minuscules 1, 209, 2193, and 2886:

Note Prior to Mark 16:9-20
Greek	English
ἔν τισι μὲν τῶν ἀντιγράφων ἕως ὦδε πληροῦται ὁ εὐαγγελιστὴς ἕως οὖ καὶ Εὐσέβιος ὁ Παμφίλου ἐκανόνισεν· ἐν πολλοῖς δὲ καὶ ταῦτα φέρεται.	In some of the copies the evangelist finishes at this point, at which point also Eusebius Pamphili finished his canons. But these [verses] are also found in many (others).

As with other manuscripts of Family 1, the story of Jesus and the woman caught in adultery (John 7:53-8:11) is placed at the end of the Gospel of John, along with a note before these final verses stating the passage is not found in numerous other manuscripts, nor do the church fathers John Chrysostom, Cyril of Alexandria, Theodore of Mopsuestia and others make commentary on it.

Note Prior to John 7:53-8:11
Greek	English
τὸ περὶ τῆς μοιχαλίδος κεφάλαιον ἐν τῷ κατὰ Ἰωάννην εὐαγγελίῷ ὡς ἐν πλείοσιν ἀντιγράφοις μὴ κείμενον, μηδὲ παρὰ τῶν θείων πατέρων τῶν ἐρμηνευσάντων μνημονευθέν, φημὶ δὴ Ἰωάννου τοῦ Χρυ(σόστομος) καὶ Κυρίλλου Ἀλεξανδρέας, οὐδὲ μὴν ὑπὸ Θεοδώρου Μωψουεστίας καὶ τῶν λοιπῶν, παρέλειψα κατὰ τὸν τόπον, κεῖται δὲ οὕτως μετ' ὀλίγα τῆς ἀρχῆς τοῦ Π̅ς̅ κεφαλαίου. ἑξῆς τοῦ Ἐρούνησον καὶ ἷδε ὅτι προφήτης ἐκ τῆς Γαλιλαίας οὐκ ἐγείρεται.	The chapter concerning the Adulteress, as in many other manuscripts, is not situated in the Gospel according to John, neither do we find it mentioned in the commentaries from the divine fathers, such as John Chrysostom, and Cyril of Alexandria, nor again by Theodore of Mopsuestia and the others, I have thus left it out of place, but putting it here thusly a small way from the beginning of the 86th chapter. After this: "Search, and you shall see that a prophet does not arise from Galilee!"

== Text ==
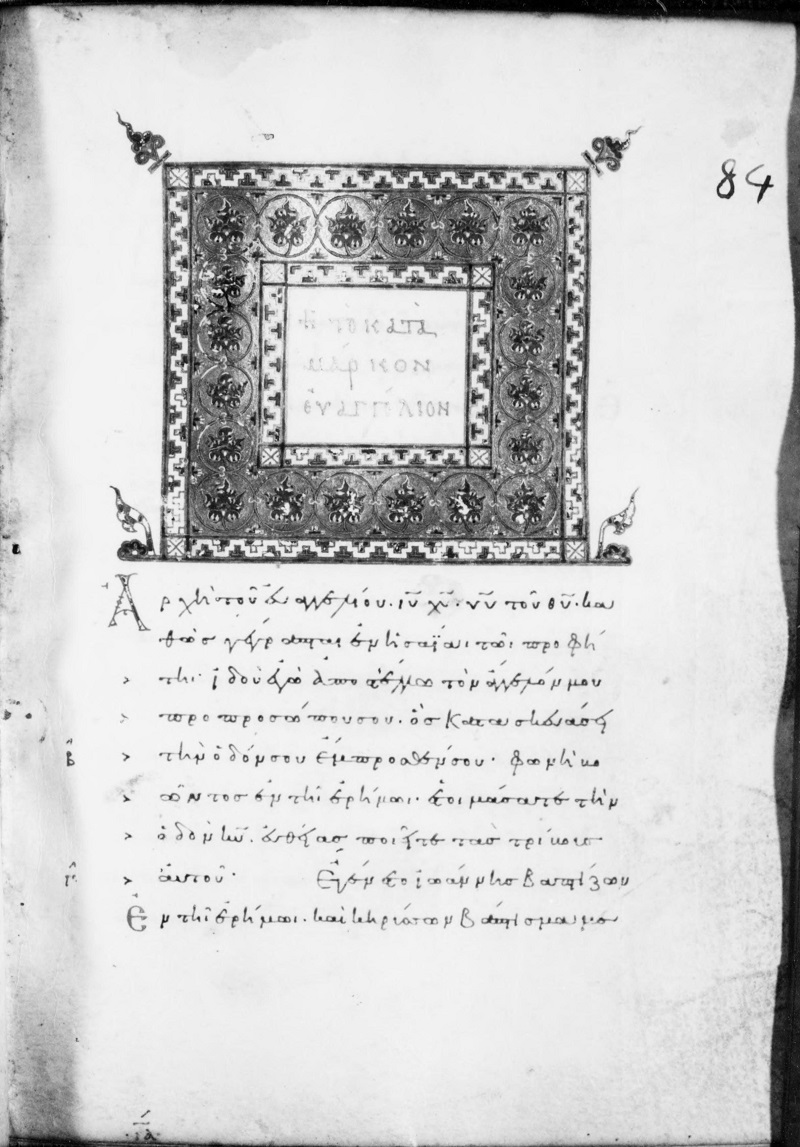
Beginning of Mark's Gospel (Mark 1:1-4) in Minuscule 1582

The Greek text of the codex, along with the rest of Family 1, has been considered as a representative of the Caesarean text-type. The text-types are groups of different New Testament manuscripts which share specific or generally related readings, which then differ from each other group, and thus the conflicting readings can separate out the groups. These are then used to determine the original text as published; there are three main groups with names: Alexandrian, Western, and Byzantine. The Caesarean text-type however (initially identified by biblical scholar Burnett Hillman Streeter) has been contested by several text-critics, such as Kurt and Barbara Aland. Kurt Aland placed it in Category III of his New Testament manuscript classification system, though does also note "further study of the unusually numerous distinctive readings may indicate [Category] II". Category III manuscripts are described as having "a small but not a negligible proportion of early readings, with a considerable encroachment of [Byzantine] readings, and significant readings from other sources as yet unidentified", and Category II manuscripts are "of a special quality, i. e., manuscripts with a considerable proportion of the early text, but which are marked by alien influences. These influences are usually of smoother, improved readings, and in later periods of infiltration by the Byzantine text."

Kim notes minuscule 1582's text is significant, as "it is one of the two closest witnesses to Origen's text of Matthew in Caesarea", with minuscule 1 being the other, and according to Kim minuscule 1582 is "a little closer" to Origen's Matthean (Gospel of Matthew) text used in Caesarea. In Kim's opinion, it has further significance in being written by the monk Ephraim, who produced another manuscript closely associated with the text of Origen, minuscule 1739, which contains the Acts of the Apostles, the Catholic Epistles, and the Pauline Epistles.

In textual-scholar Amy Anderson's study of minuscule 1582, she demonstrates family 1 (in Matthew at least) does represent a text which was available to Origen at Caesarea, especially in several of the marginal notes included in the manuscript. There were 158 places where Family 1 and citations in Origen's commentaries overlapped; 108 times Origen and minuscule 1582 agreed on the same variant reading, with seven readings contained in minuscule 1582's marginal notes also agreeing with Origen's text. There were 60 times where Origen's text disagreed with minuscule 1582; however, as manuscripts with Origen's textual commentaries extant would quote the same passage with different variants, it resulted in Origen supporting two competing variant readings. This is likely due to textual corruption in the manuscripts from which Origen's New Testament citations are contained, with some probable corrections to the majority text in family 1 manuscripts.

According to the Claremont Profile Method (a specific analysis method of textual data), it represents Family 1 in Luke chapters 1, 10, and 20 as a core member.

== History ==
The manuscript was written by a monk named Ephraim in 948 CE, likely in Constantinople. It was rediscovered in the early 20th century by an unnamed scholar at the Vatopedi Monastery on Mount Athos. Though no official collation had been published, variants from the manuscript were cited in the apparatus of textual critic Hermann von Soden's Die Schriften des Neuen Testaments. Teil 4 (a critical edition of the Greek New Testament), where he gave it the number ε183.

Biblical scholar Burnett Hillman Streeter drew attention to the manuscript and its relationship with Family 1 (especially minuscule 1) in his book The Four Gospels: A Study of Origins, to which biblical scholars Kirsopp Lake, Silva Lake, and Robert Blake made use of in further publications concerning the Caesarean text, even though their initial response was indifferent. A full study of minuscule 1582 was promised by several scholars (Silva Lake, Kwang-Won Kim), from this point, however none would materialise. This changed in 2004 when Anderson published the revision of her doctrinal dissertation, The Textual Tradition of the Gospels: Family 1 in Matthew, although even this study concentrated on the Matthean portion of the codex, and not its entirety. The manuscript is now in the Vatopedi Monastery on Mount Athos (shelf number 949), in Greece.

== See also ==
- List of New Testament minuscules
- Textual criticism
- Biblical manuscript
