= Codex Basilensis A. N. IV. 2 =

Greek minuscule manuscript of the New Testament

Minuscule 1
- New Testament manuscript
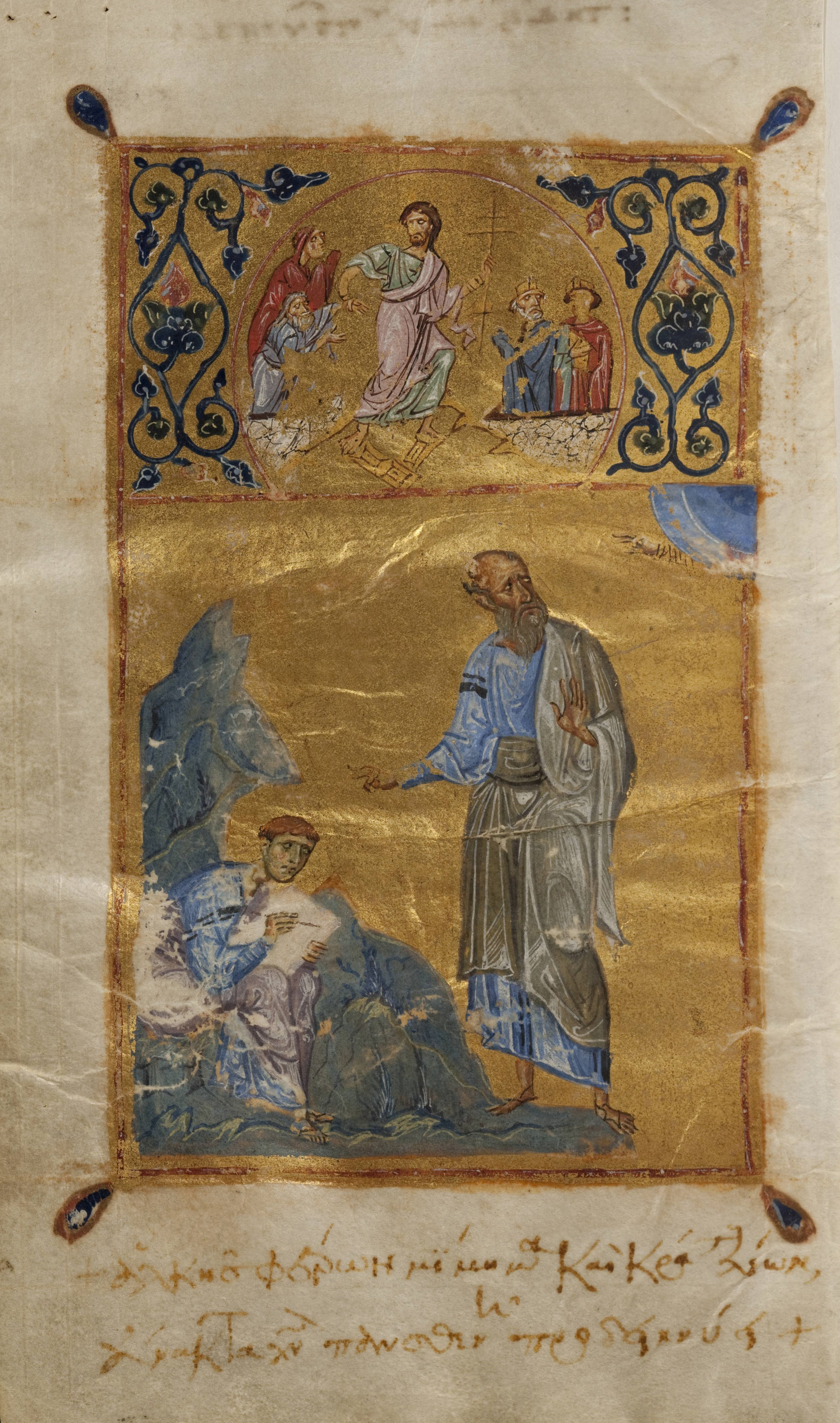
- Folio 265 verso, portrait of John and Prochor
- Name: Basiliensis A.N.IV.2
- Text: New Testament (except Apocalypse)
- Date: 12th century
- Script: Greek
- Now at: Basel University Library
- Cite: K. Lake, Codex 1 of the Gospels and its Allies, (Cambridge 1902)
- Size: 18.5 cm by 11.5 cm
- Type: Caesarean, Byzantine text-type
- Category: III, V
- Hand: elegantly written
- Note: member of f^{1}

Codex Basilensis A. N. IV. 2 is a Greek minuscule manuscript of the entire New Testament, apart from the Book of Revelation. It is designated by the siglum 1 in the Gregory-Aland numbering of New Testament manuscripts, and δ 254 in von Soden's numbering of New Testament manuscripts, and formerly designated by 1^{eap} to distinguish it from minuscule 1^{rK} (which previously used number 1). Using the study of comparative writings styles (palaeography), it is usually dated to the 12th century CE.

The manuscript was prepared for liturgical use with marginalia (text division), and has almost completely survived; Erasmus used it for his Novum Instrumentum omne (an edition of the Greek New Testament). The text of the manuscript has been cited in all critical editions of the Greek New Testament; in this codex, the text of the Gospels is more highly esteemed by scholars than that of the remaining New Testament books. The codex is housed at the Basel University Library, with shelf number A. N. IV, 2 (earlier B. VI. 27).

== Description ==
The manuscript is a codex (precursor to the modern book format) made of 297 parchment leaves (18.5 cm by 11.5 cm), containing the entire New Testament (except the Book of Revelation). The text is written in one column per page, 38 lines per page. It was originally accompanied by miniatures, which were stolen before 1860–1862 (except one before the Gospel of John, which remains).

The dimensions of the text are 13.6 cm by 6.8 cm. It was written continuously and without separation in an elegant minuscule hand, furnished with breathings (spiritus asper, spiritus lenis), accents, and Iota adscript. The initial letters are gilt, and on the first page of each Gospel the full stop is a large gilt ball.

The text is divided according to chapters (known as κεφαλαια / kephalaia) whose numbers are given in the margin, with their titles (known as τιτλοι / titloi) written at the top of the pages. The text of the Gospels is divided according to the smaller Ammonian Sections (352 in Matthew; 236 in Mark with the last numbered section in 16:12; 340 in Luke; and 227 in John), but references to the Eusebian Canons are absent (both early divisions of the Gospels into sections). The Book of Acts and the epistles have the Euthalian Apparatus.

It contains prolegomena, synaxaria (a list of saint days), two types of lectionary markings in the margin (for liturgical reading), and pictures (e.g. a portrait of John the Evangelist and Prochorus). The later type of liturgical notes, so called "Readings" (αναγνωσεις / anagnoseis), only seen in the Gospels, were added by a later hand in red ink. There are 116 αναγνωσεις in Matthew, 70 in Mark, 114 in Luke, and 67 in John. In the 15th century, a later hand added the Prolegomena.

The codex contains a scholion questioning the authenticity of Mark 16:9-20. The Pericope Adulterae (John 7:53-8:11) is placed after John 21:25.

Order of Books

- Gospels
- Acts of the Apostles
- General Epistles
- Pauline Epistles (Hebrews is included as the last book).

== Text ==
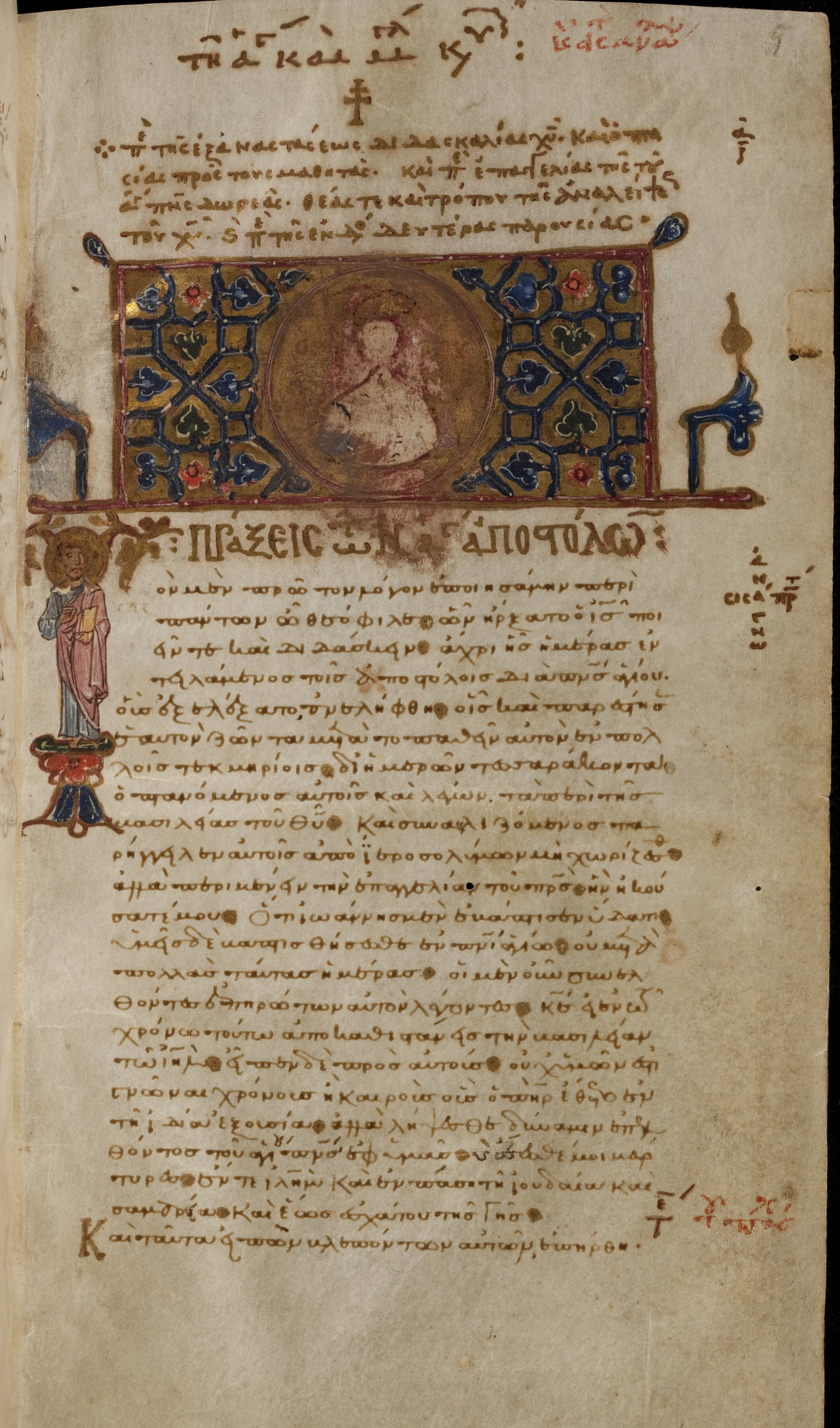
The beginning of the Book of Acts

In Aland's Profile, biblical scholars Kurt and Barbara Aland placed the codex's Gospels in Category III, meaning it has historical importance, with the profile of 119^{1}, 80^{2}, 60^{1/2}, 69^{s}. This means the text of the codex agrees with the Byzantine standard text 119 times, with the original text against the Byzantine 80 times, and with both the Byzantine and original text 60 times. There are 69 independent or distinctive readings in the Gospels. While the Gospels in codex 1 are considered a representative of the Caesarean text-type, the remainder of the books of the New Testament are considered a representative of the Byzantine text-type and falls into Category V, the lowest and least important in Aland's Profile.

It belongs to the textual Family 1 with manuscripts 118, 131 and 209. Classification in this textual family was supported by the Claremont Profile Method, but it was only examined with this method in Luke 1, Luke 10 and Luke 20.

Griesbach was the first who noted its similarities to the text of Origen's commentary to the Gospel of Matthew. According to Hort, its text preceded the byzantine text-type.

Biblical scholar Kirsopp Lake compared the text of the codex with the text of Stephanus, and showed that minuscule 1 contains 2243 variants from the Textus Receptus in the sections comprising Matthew 1–10, Matthew 22–Mark 14, Luke 4-23, and John 1-13 and 18.

In Matthew 27:16, it has the well-known textual variant "Ιησουν τον Βαραββαν" (Jesus Barabbas). This variant also appears in Codex Koridethi (Θ), Minuscule 700, and other members of the group ƒ^{1}.

== History ==
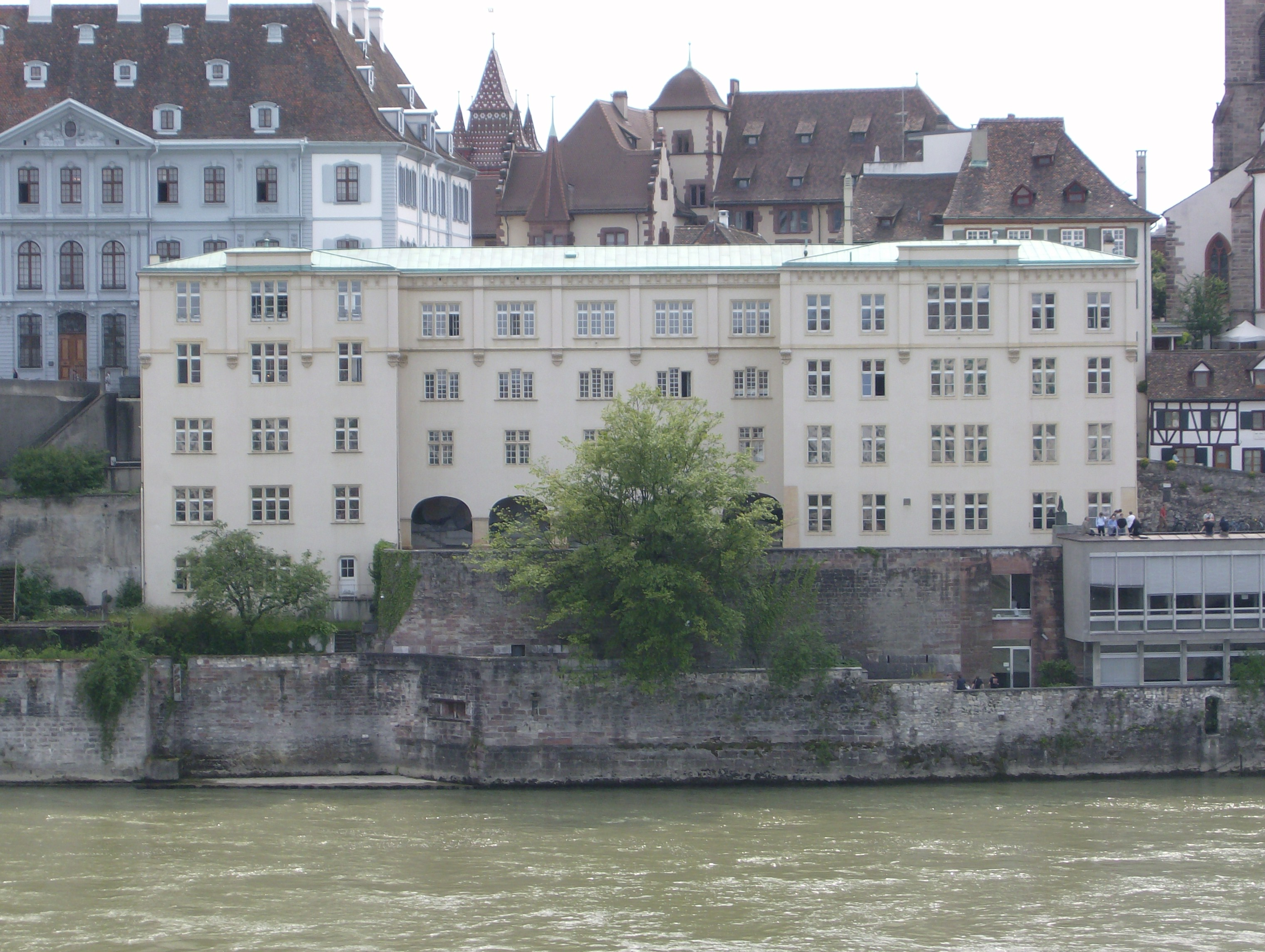
University of Basel

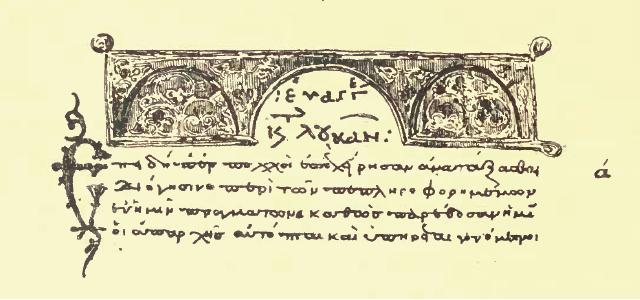
Luke 1:1-2 (Scrivener's facsimile)

Textual critics and palaeographers like Wettstein, Tischendorf, Scrivener and Gregory dated the manuscript to the 10th century. Henri Omont and Lake dated it to the 12th century, and Dean Burgon to the 12th or 13th century. It is dated by the Institute for New Testament Textual Research to the 12th century because the frequent occurrence of enlarged letters, rounded breathing marks, flourishes and ligatures seem to eliminate earlier dates.

The manuscript was presented to the monastery of the Preaching Friars by Cardinal Ragusio, general of the Dominicans. It was used by Desiderius Erasmus in the first edition of his Novum Testamentum (1516); as a result, some of its readings are found in the Textus Receptus. Erasmus used this codex very little because its text was different from other manuscripts with which he was acquainted. Oecolampadius and Gerbelius (Erasmus's sub-editors) insisted that he use more readings from this codex in his third edition; however according to Erasmus, the text of this codex was altered from the Latin manuscripts and had secondary value. Since 1559, it has been kept at the University of Basel, along with Codex Basilensis and minuscule 2.

Johann Albrecht Bengel used several extracts from the codex, and Wettstein was the first who thoroughly examined it. According to him, in the Gospels its text agrees with the most ancient codices and patristic quotations; therefore, he called it number one. In 1751 he changed his high opinion (Novum Testamentum Græcum), dating the codex to the 10th century. Wettstein collated this manuscript twice, with many errors; according to biblical scholar Samuel Prideaux Tregelles, his collation was incorrect in more than 1,200 readings. Leonard Hug supported Wettstein's last opinion that the codex was Latinisated. Tregelles and Roth again collated the text of this codex, and Tregelles noticed that it was textually close to Minuscule 118. Dean Burgon noticed that minuscules 131 and 209 were also textually similar. This entire group was examined by Kirsopp Lake in 1902, and it was called "the Lake Group" (or Family 1). The text of the family was established on the basis of minuscule 1 (the manuscript was collated with Minuscules 118, 131, and 209).

Scrivener demonstrated that at least 22 verses of Erasmian's Greek New Testament text were derived from minuscule 1:

- Matthew 22:28; Matthew 23:25; Matthew 27:52; Matthew 28:3, Matthew 28:4, Matthew 28:19, Matthew 28:20
- Mark 7:18, Mark 7:19, Mark 7:26; Mark 10:1; Mark 12:22; Mark 15:46
- Luke 1:16, Luke 1:61; Luke 2:43; Luke 9:1, Luke 9:15; Luke 11:49
- John 1:28; John 10:8; John 13:20

The manuscript has been cited in all critical editions of the Greek New Testament, and systematically cited in the third and fourth editions edited by United Bible Societies (UBS3 and UBS4) and Nestle-Aland's 26th and 27th editions (NA26 and NA27). In NA27, the codex is cited as a witness of the first order.

== See also ==
- List of New Testament minuscules
- Novum Instrumentum omne
- Textual criticism
