= Lectionary 208 =

Lectionary ℓ 208
- New Testament manuscript
- Text: Evangelistarium †
- Date: 12th century
- Script: Greek
- Now at: Bodleian Library
- Size: 25 cm by 19.5 cm

Lectionary 208, designated by siglum ℓ 208 (in the Gregory-Aland numbering) is a Greek manuscript of the New Testament, on parchment. It is dated by a colophon to the year 1068. Scrivener labelled it by 215^{evl}. The manuscript is lacunose.

== Description ==
The codex contains lessons from the Gospels of John, Matthew, Luke lectionary (Evangelistarium), on 217 parchment leaves (25 cm by 19.5 cm), with some lacunae. The text is written in Greek minuscule letters, in two columns per page, 22 lines per page. It contains musical notes and pictures. The manuscript contains two leaves (first and last), with the text of the Old Testament, being to be earlier.

There are daily lessons from Easter to Pentecost.

== History ==
According to the colophon it was written by Leontius, a monk, in A.D. 1068.

Scrivener and Gregory dated it to the 11th century. It has been assigned by the Institute for New Testament Textual Research to the 12th century.

The manuscript was added to the list of New Testament manuscripts by Scrivener (number 215) and Gregory (number 208). Gregory saw it in 1883.

The manuscript is not cited in the critical editions of the Greek New Testament (UBS3).

The codex is located in the Bodleian Library (Wake 15) at Oxford.

== See also ==
- List of New Testament lectionaries
- Biblical manuscript
- Textual criticism

== Bibliography ==
- Dated Greek Minuscule Manuscripts to the Year 1200, ed. Kirsopp Lake and Silva Lake (Boston) V, 194
