= Lectionary 22 =

Lectionary ℓ 22
- New Testament manuscript
- Text: Evangelistarion
- Date: 14th-century
- Script: Greek
- Now at: Bodleian Library
- Size: 26.5 cm by 21 cm

Lectionary 22, designated by siglum ℓ 22 (in the Gregory-Aland numbering). It is a Greek manuscript of the New Testament, on vellum leaves. Palaeographically it has been assigned to the 14th-century.

== Description ==
The codex contains lessons from the Gospels of John lectionary (Evangelistarium), with numerous lacunae. It is written in Greek minuscule letters, on 63 parchment leaves (26.5 cm by 21 cm), 2 columns per page, 23-27 lines per page. It contains Menologion and patristic homilies (Gregory of Nazianzus).

== History ==
Formerly the manuscript was known as Codex Seldeni 5. It was added to the list of the New Testament manuscripts by Wettstein. The codex was examined by Mill and Griesbach. C. R. Gregory saw it in 1883.

The manuscript is not cited in the critical editions of the Greek New Testament (UBS3).

Kirsopp and Silva Lake published its facsimile.

Currently the codex is located in the Bodleian Library (Arch. Selden. B. 54, fol. 155-217) in Oxford.

== See also ==
- List of New Testament lectionaries
- Biblical manuscript
- Textual criticism

== Bibliography ==
- Gregory, Caspar René (1900). Textkritik des Neuen Testaments. Vol. 1. Leipzig: J.C. Hinrichs. p. 389.
