= Lectionary 203 =

Lectionary ℓ 203
- New Testament manuscript
- Text: Evangelistarium
- Date: 11th century
- Script: Greek
- Now at: Bodleian Library
- Size: 28.5 cm by 20.5 cm

Lectionary 203, designated by siglum ℓ 203 (in the Gregory-Aland numbering) is a Greek manuscript of the New Testament, on parchment. Palaeographically it has been assigned to the 11th century. Scrivener labelled it by 211^{evl}. The manuscript has complex contents.

== Description ==
The codex contains lessons from the Gospels of John, Matthew, Luke lectionary (Evangelistarium), on 300 parchment leaves (28.5 cm by 20.5 cm). The text is written in Greek minuscule letters, in one column per page, 24 lines per page. It contains musical notes and Menologion at the end. The first two leaves and the last two were evidently written and inserted later in place of two damaged leaves, and bear the date A.D. 1067, probably copied from the vanished leaf.

There are weekday Gospel lessons.

== History ==
Scrivener dated the manuscript to the 11th century, Gregory dated it to the 13th century. It has been assigned by the INTF to the 11th century.

The manuscript was added to the list of New Testament manuscripts by Scrivener (number 211) and Gregory (number 203). Gregory saw it in 1883.

The codex is located in the Bodleian Library (Auct. F. 6. 25) at Oxford.

== See also ==
- List of New Testament lectionaries
- Biblical manuscript
- Textual criticism

== Bibliography ==
- Dated Greek Minuscule Manuscripts to the Year 1200, ed. Kirsopp Lake and Silva Lake (Boston) II, 59
