= Minuscule 118 =

- New Testament manuscript
- Text: Gospels
- Date: 13th-century
- Script: Greek
- Now at: Bodleian Library
- Size: 20.5 cm by 14.8 cm
- Type: Caesarean text-type
- Category: III
- Hand: not neat
- Note: marginalia

Minuscule 118 is a Greek minuscule manuscript of the New Testament, made of parchment. It is designated by the siglum 118 in the Gregory-Aland numbering of New Testament manuscripts, and ε 346 in the von Soden numbering of New Testament manuscripts.

Using the study of comparative writing styles (palaeography), it has been assigned to the 13th century. It has complex contents with some marginal notes.

== Description ==
The manuscript is a codex (precursor to the modern book format), containing an almost complete text of the four Gospels written on 256 parchment leaves (sized 20.5 cm by 14.8 cm), with the average dimensions of the text-block being 15 cm by 10.5 cm. The text is written in one column, 23-27 lines per page. Some texts were defective and were thus supplied in the 15th century on six paper leaves, with later hands recopying the texts of Matthew 1:1-6:2; Luke 13:15-14:20, 18:8-19:9, and John 16:25-end.

The text is not divided according to the chapters (known as κεφαλαια / kephalaia), but there are chapter titles (known as τιτλοι / titloi) written at the top of the pages. There is a division according to the Ammonian Sections (234 in Mark 234, last at 16:9), but this was added by a later hand, along with references to the Eusebian Canons (both early systems for dividing the Gospels into sections).

It contains the Eusebian tables, content tables (also known as κεφαλαια) before each Gospel, and lectionary markings in the margin (for liturgical use). Biblical scholar Frederick H. A Scrivener stated that the manuscript contained the numbers of lines (known as στιχοι / stichoi), and the numbers of phrases (known as ρηματα / rhemata); however biblical scholar Kirsopp Lake corrected this as notes it doesn't contain the rhemata, and the stichoi are only found in the Gospels of Luke and John, both written by later hands and on supplementary paper leaves. The Synaxaria and Menologion were added by a later hand.

The codex contains supplementary leaves in Matthew, Luke, and John. The supplementary leaves of Luke 13:35-14:20 and 18:8-29 are a palimpsest written on parchment, with the underwriting containing the Psalms. The hand is "not neat, but readable."

== Text ==
The Greek text of the codex is considered to be a representative of the Caesarean text-type. It belongs to the textual Family 1. Biblical scholar Kurt Aland placed it in Category III of his New Testament manuscript classification system. Category III manuscripts are described as having "a small but not a negligible proportion of early readings, with a considerable encroachment of [Byzantine] readings, and significant readings from other sources as yet unidentified."

As a member of Family 1 (ƒ^{1}), it has a close affinity to the codices 205 and 209. Together they constitute a sub-group within this family. According to the Claremont Profile Method (a specific analysis of textual data), 118 is a core member of Family 1.

== History ==
The earliest history of the manuscript is unknown. It was donated by Narcissus March († 1713), Archbishop of Armagh, to the Bodleian Library. It was given to March by Dr Halifax, about the year 1699. There is evidence that mice have attempted to eat part of the manuscript, whilst it was left lying on its side for some unknown period of time. It was likely rebound by the Bodleian Library after it came into its possession. Though its main provenance is unknown, as Dr Halifax was chaplain at the church in Aleppo between 1687 and 1695, it is probable that he brought it from that location.

It was collated by textual critic Johann J. Griesbach. According to Griesbach, the text of this manuscript is a representative of the Alexandrian textual recension. Biblical scholar Caspar René Gregory saw it in 1883. The manuscript was subsequently examined by Lake, who placed it within Family 1.

Gregory dated it to the 13th-century. It is currently dated by the INTF to the 13th century. It is presently housed at the Bodleian Library (shelf number MS. Auct. D. inf. 2.17), in Oxford.

== See also ==
- Minuscule 119
- Minuscule 117
- Family 1
- List of New Testament minuscules
- Biblical manuscript
- Textual criticism
