= John of Ragusa =

Croatian Dominican theologian

John of Ragusa (Croatian: Ivan Stojković; c. 1380 – 1443) was a Croatian Dominican theologian. He was president of the Council of Basel and a papal legate to the Byzantine Empire. He was created a cardinal by Antipope Felix V.

== Life ==
Born at Dubrovnik, Republic of Ragusa, John entered the Dominican Order and devoted himself to the observance of the rule of his order and the study of the sacred sciences. By reason of his great attainments in theology, Scripture, and Semitic languages, he was considered an oracle in his native Dalmatia.

In 1420 he became a master of theology at the University of Paris.

In the year 1426 he was appointed procurator general of the Dominican Order, and went to reside at Rome under Pope Martin V. There he received marks of honour and esteem from the pope and the College of Cardinals, and the former eventually named him papal theologian for the General Council of Basle. John was, moreover, chosen to open the council, in place of Cardinal Julian Cesarini, who was detained by other business.

Arriving at Basle on 19 May 1431, he on the same day arranged with the Bishop of Basle for the opening of the council on the 23rd of the same month. The opening did not take place, however, until 23 July 1431, in the cathedral church, when John preached from the text: "Et angelus testamenti, quem vos vultis. Ecce venit" (Mal., iii, 1). In the council he exonerated the absent cardinals from the charge of contempt (Feb., 1433). On eight mornings he spoke against the doctrines of the Hussites.

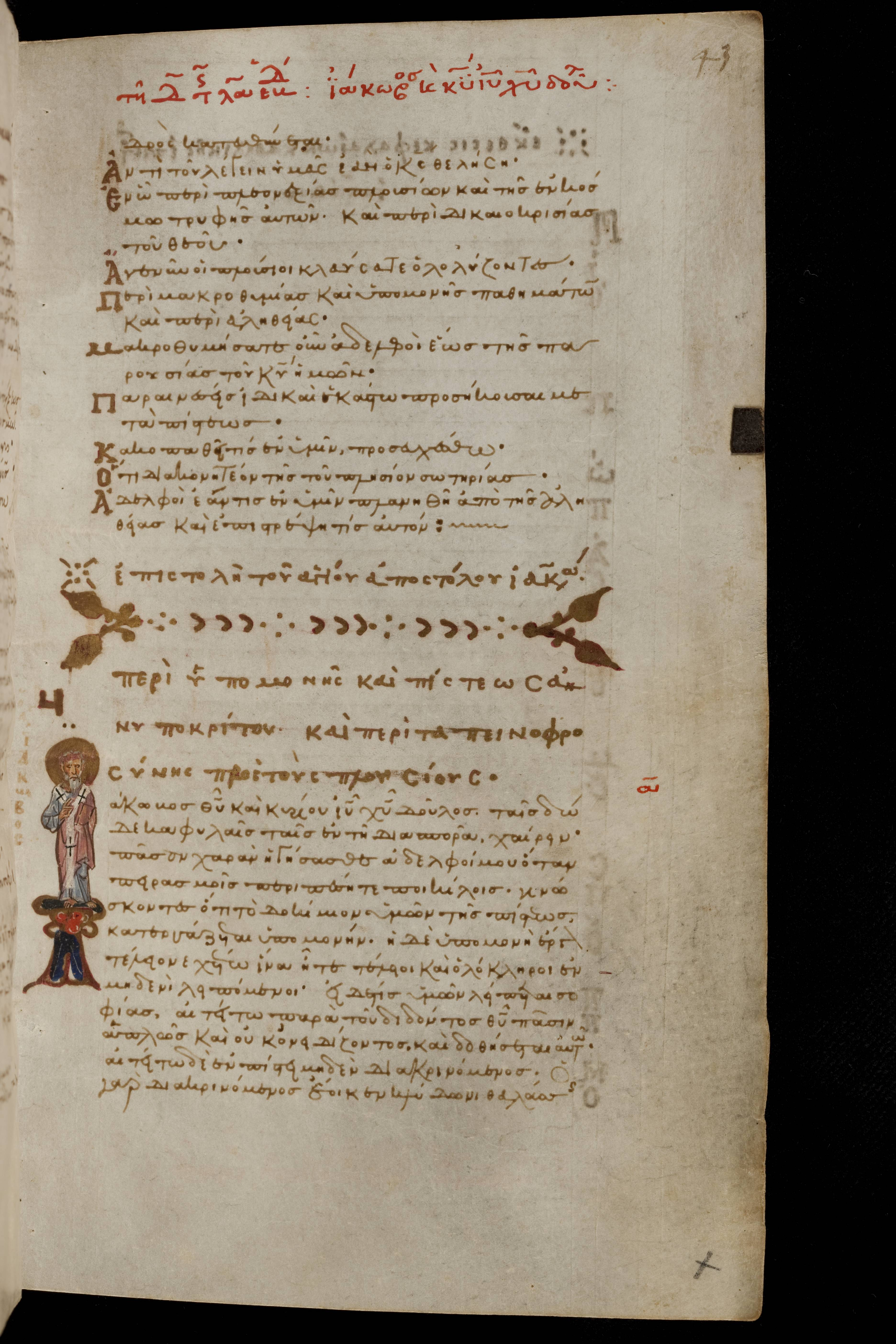
Codex Basilensis A. N. IV. 2, a Greek New Testament manuscript brought from Constantinople to Basle by John

Having been sent as a legate of the council to Constantinople to urge the reunion of the Eastern and Western Churches, John of Ragusa induced the Emperor John VIII Palaiologos and the Patriarch Joseph to send an embassy to the council through the treaty which they made with Pope Eugenius IV was broken by the Greeks. John afterwards sojourned at Constantinople to study the Greek language and to become better acquainted with the situation of ecclesiastical affairs.

Here he completed an etymological work bearing upon the Greek text of Scripture and destined to be of service to Catholic controversialists in treating of the doctrine of the Procession of the Holy Ghost against the Greek "schismatics". He returned to Bologna as a member of a deputation, to obtain from Eugenius IV an assurance that the pope would be present at the council. Having acceded to this request, Eugenius employed John once more to be the bearer of a document (dated 15 July 1437) to the Greek emperor in which the emperor's assistance was invited at a meeting of the council to be held in some Italian city. John's subsequent course has been a subject of dispute: some authors assert that he remained in sympathy with the council, while others insist that he allied himself with Eugenius IV, who made him Bishop of Argos. It is probable that he took the side of Eugenius.

He died at Lausanne, Switzerland in 1443.

== Works ==
His extant writings are:

- Tractatus de Ecclesia, published in Zagreb in 1986;
- Discourse against the Hussites delivered at the Council of Basle;
- the Acts, or Reports, of his embassies to Constantinople, to be found among the Acts of the Council of Basle;
- an account of his travels in the East, preserved by Leo Allatius.

His work on Greek indeclinable nouns and Scriptural Greek etymology seems to have been lost.
