= Family 1 =

Collection of related medieval Biblical Manuscripts regarded as a 'Family'

List of Family 1 manuscripts
Minuscule 1	Minuscule 22
Minuscule 118	Minuscule 131
Minuscule 209	Minuscule 872
Minuscule 1278	Minuscule 1582
Minuscule 2193	Minuscule 2886

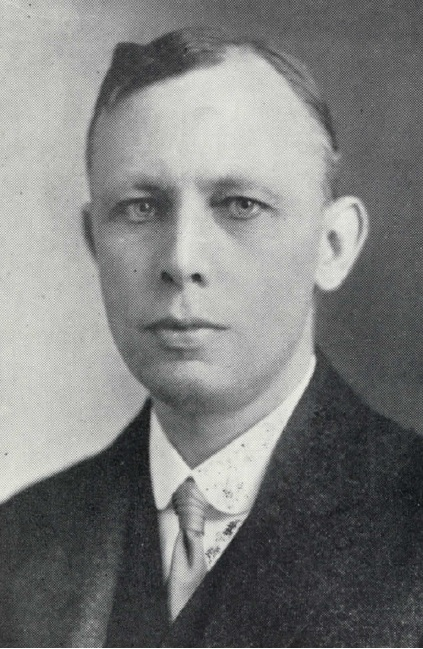
Kirsopp Lake c. 1914

Family 1 is the name given to a group of Greek New Testament minuscule manuscripts of the Gospels, identified by biblical scholar Kirsopp Lake. These manuscripts vary in date from the 12th to the 15th century. The group takes its name from minuscule codex 1, now in the Basel University Library, Switzerland. "Family 1" is also symbolized as ƒ^{1} in critical editions of the Greek New Testament. Textual-critic Hermann von Soden refers to the group as I^{η}. Initially named after minuscule 1, later studies have demonstrated that another minuscule, minuscule 1582, is likely a better candidate as a representation of the archetype from which the Family 1 manuscripts are descended.

All ƒ^{1} manuscripts place the Pericope adulterae (John 7:53-8:11) after John 21:25 (the final verse of the book) as a separate story, and do not include it as a part of the Gospel as it is in the majority of manuscripts.

== History ==
Family 1 was identified in 1902, when Lake published Codex 1 of the Gospels and its Allies, and established the existence of a new textual family of Biblical manuscripts. This group of manuscripts was initially based on the following four minuscules (minuscule refers to the style of Greek handwriting developed during the 9th-10th centuries CE, which overtook the earlier predominant uncial Greek script):

Minuscule 1
Minuscule 118
Minuscule 131
Minuscule 209

The group was then joined by the minuscules 22 and 1582. The minuscules 205, 872, 1278, 2193, and 2886 (formerly labelled 205^{abs}) are now considered to be members of the family also.

Biblical scholar Silva Lake (wife of Kirsopp Lake), discovered that Minuscule 652 represents the text of ƒ^{1} in Mark 4:20-6:24, though this agreement was mainly with minuscules 118, 131, and 209, as opposed to a similar agreement with minuscule 1.

Biblical scholar Amy Anderson made a new reconstruction of the family tree in 2004, demonstrating minuscule 1582 was a more exact representation of the text of the archetype than minuscule 1. She identified the Family 1 manuscripts in Matthew as the minuscules 1, 22, 118, 131, 205, 209, 872, 1192, 1210, 1278, 1582, and 2193. Anderson also classified these manuscripts into four sub-groups: 1) manuscripts 1 and 1582 are core family members; 2) manuscripts 118, 205 and 209 are closely related to the core family members, with several variations; 3) manuscripts 22, 1192 and 1210 demonstrate a significant relationship; and 4) manuscripts 131, 872, 1278 and 2193 are textually complex, having numerous Byzantine readings, though likely had a Family 1 manuscript as an ancestor. Lastly Anderson discussed the relationship of minuscule 2542 to Family 1, which only had six Family 1 readings in the entirety of Matthew. Hence though minuscule 2542 is considered a Family 1 member at least in Luke chapters 10 and 20, in Matthew it is a purely Byzantine manuscript, despite several singular readings.

Alison Sarah Welsby, in her 2012 doctoral thesis, identified the ƒ^{1} manuscripts in John as the minuscules 1, 22, 118, 131, 205^{abs} (2886), 205, 209, 565, 872, 884, 1192, 1210, 1278, 1582, 2193, 2372, and 2713, also coinciding with Anderson's view that 1582 was a better ƒ^{1} witness than 1. The work of Michael Bruce Morrill on John 18 also confirmed 138, 357, 994, 2517 and 2575 as core members of ƒ^{1} in John's Gospel.

The most obvious characteristic of Family 1 is that these manuscripts place the Pericope adulterae (John 7:53-8:11) after John 21:25. Manuscripts of this family include the Longer ending of Mark to the text, but minuscules 1, 209, 1582, 2193 and 2886 contain an explanatory comment (known as a scholion) that brings into question the authenticity of Mark 16:9-20. Accordingly scholars use these colophons along with other arguments as evidence that the original Gospel of Mark ended at verse 8, with verses 9-20 being added on later:

Note Prior to Mark 16:9-20
Greek	English
ἔν τισι μὲν τῶν ἀντιγράφων ἕως ὦδε πληροῦται ὁ εὐαγγελιστὴς ἕως οὖ καὶ Εὐσέβιος ὁ Παμφίλου ἐκανόνισεν· ἐν πολλοῖς δὲ καὶ ταῦτα φέρεται.	In some of the copies the evangelist finishes at this point, at which point also Eusebius Pamphili finished his canons. But these [verses] are also found in many (others).

A similar scholion appears in the minuscules 22, 1192, and 1210:

Note Prior to Mark 16:9-20
Greek	English
ἔν τισι τῶν ἀντιγράφων ἕως ὦδε πληροῦται ὁ εὐαγγελιστὴς ἐν πολλοῖς δὲ καὶ ταῦτα φέρεται.	In some of the copies the evangelist finishes at this point. But these [verses] are also found in many (others).

Within the family, there are three manuscripts which may be more closely related. 209 was part of Catholic humanist and theologian Cardinal Bessarion's collection by 1438, and may have served as the exemplar for minuscule 2886, which was copied at his direction before 1468, and even minuscule 205, which was copied at his direction after 1468.

Minuscule 2886, before receiving its own Gregory-Aland number (an official list of known New Testament manuscripts), was long assumed to be a direct copy of 205 and was thus named 205^{abs} (from Abschrift, the German word for copy). Biblical scholar D. C. Parker rehearsed Lake's views who thought 209 to have been the parent of 205, and then Parker rehearses Josef Schmid's views who considered 2886 and 205 to be daughters of 209's lost sister.

== Text ==
Textual-critic Kurt Aland lists the group under Category III in the Gospels and Category V for the other books in his New Testament manuscripts classification system. Category III manuscripts are described as having "a small but not a negligible proportion of early readings, with a considerable encroachment of [Byzantine] readings, and significant readings from other sources as yet unidentified." Category V is for "Manuscripts with a purely or predominantly Byzantine text." Concerning minuscule 1582 however, Aland suggests further investigation into its several distinctive readings could place it in Category II manuscripts, which are described as "of a special quality, i.e., manuscripts with a considerable proportion of the early text, but which are marked by alien influences. These influences are usually of smoother, improved readings, and in later periods of infiltration by the Byzantine text."

=== An example of the Caesarean text? ===
Biblical scholar Burnett Hillman Streeter, working largely on the basis of data supplied by Lake, proposed that ƒ^{1}, along with Codex Koridethi (Θ), Family 13 (ƒ^{13}), the minuscules 28, 565, 700, the Armenian and Georgian versions, and later on also Codex Washingtonianus (W), were the remnants of what he labelled the Caesarean text, differing in a number of common respects from the then established Byzantine, Western and Alexandrian text-types. (The text-types are groups of different New Testament manuscripts which share specific or generally related readings, which then differ from each other group, and thus the conflicting readings can separate out the groups and used for textual criticism. These are then used to determine the original text as published; the three main types are as above.) Scholars disagree as to whether this is a correct classification, or if a "Caesarean text-type" even exists, it is however demonstratable that ƒ^{1} is not able to be placed within the Alexandrian, Western, or Byzantine text-types.

In Anderson's study of minuscule 1582, she demonstrates Family 1 (in Matthew at least) does represent a text which was available to Origen at Caesarea, especially in several of the marginal notes include in the manuscript. There were 158 places where Family 1 and citations in Origen's commentaries overlapped; 112 times they agreed on the same variant reading, with seven readings contained in minuscule 1582's marginal notes also agreeing with Origen's text. There were 60 times where Origen's text disagreed with minuscule 1582, however as manuscripts with Origen's textual commentaries extant would quote the same passage with different variants, it resulted in Origen supporting two competing variant readings. This is likely due to textual corruption in the manuscripts from which Origen's New Testament citations are contained, with some probable corrections to the majority text in Family 1 manuscripts. Anderson does not however give a judgement on whether these agreements constituted the existence of a "Caesarean text-type", stating "the question of the existence of a 'Caesarean text-type' will await further investigation."

Claremont group profile

According to the Claremont Profile Method (a specific analysis of textual data), the group profiles of the Lake's Family in Luke 1, 10, and 20 are:

Luke 1: 9, 11, 17, 20, (22), 23, 24, 25, 26, 28, 29, 32, (34), 36, 37, 40, 43, (47), 48, 50, 51, 53.
Luke 10: 2, 5, 6, 7, 11, 13, 15, 20, 22, (23), 27, (29), 34, 37, 40, 44, 45, 46, 49, 50, 51, 52, 54, 55, 56, 58, 59, 62.
Luke 20: 1, 5, 6, (7), 10, 11, 14, 19, 20, 25, 27, 28, 29, 31, 33, 41, 44, 45, 48, 51, 56, 58, 59, 60, 61, 62, 63, 64, 66, 67, 68, 69, 72, 75, 76.

=== Relationship to the Textus Receptus ===
A comparison of the texts of the four main Lake manuscripts (1, 118, 131, and 209) with the text of the Textus Receptus, shows there are 2243 variants in ƒ^{1} from the Textus Receptus in the sections comprising Matthew 1-10, Matthew 22-Mark 14, Luke 4-23, John 1-13, and John 18; 1731 of these are found in codices 118 and 209, and 209 has 214 more variants not found in 118. Similarly there are 1188 variants in ƒ^{1} from the Textus Receptus for the sections comprising Mark 1-5 and Luke 1-24, of which 804 are found in 131, which elsewhere agrees very closely with the Textus Receptus. Lake did not enumerate itacistic differences.

=== Notable family readings ===
Matthew 5:44

ευλογειτε τους καταρωμενους υμας, καλως ποιειτε τοις μισουσιν υμας (bless those who curse you, do good to those who hate you)

omit - ƒ^{1} א B k syr^{c, s} sa bo.
incl. - Majority of manuscripts

Matthew 8:13

και υποστρεψας ο εκατονταρχος εις τον οικον αυτου εν αυτη τη ωρα ευρεν τον παιδα υγιαινοντα (and when the centurion returned to the house in that hour, he found the slave well)

incl. - ƒ^{1} א C (N) Θ (0250) (33 1241) g^{1} syr^{h}
omit - Majority.

Matthew 20:23

και το βαπτισμα ο εγω βαπτιζομαι βαπτισθησεσθε (and be baptized with the baptism that I am baptized with)

omit — ƒ^{1} א B D L Z Θ 085 ƒ^{13} it syr^{s, c} cop^{sa}
incl. - Majority of manuscripts

Matthew 27:35

τα ιματια μου εαυτοις, και επι τον ιματισμον μου εβαλον κληρον (my clothes for themselves, and for my cloak they threw lots)

incl. — ƒ^{1} Δ Θ 0250 ƒ^{13} 537 1424
omit - Majority of manuscripts

Mark 6:51

εξεπλήσσοντο (they were astounded) - ƒ^{1}
εξίσταντο (they were astonished) - א B L Δ 28 79 892 1342
εξίσταντο καὶ ἐθαύμαζον (they were astonished and marvelled) - Majority of manuscripts

Mark 11:10

ευλογημενη η βασιλεια του πατρος ημων Δαβιδ Ωσαννα εν τοις υψιστοις ειρηνη εν ουρανω και δοξα εν υψιστοις (Blessed be the kingdom of our father, David! Hosanna in the highest; peace in heaven and glory on high!) — 1-131-209 Θ
η ερχομενη βασιλεια εν ονοματι Κυριου ευλογημενη η βασιλεια του πατρος ημων Δαβιδ Ωσαννα εν τοις υψιστοις (the coming kingdom in the name of Yahweh! Blessed be the kingdom of our father, David! Hosanna in the highest!) — 118

Luke 11:4

αλλα ρυσαι ημας απο του πονηρου (but deliver us from evil)

omit - ƒ^{1} א B L 700 vg syr^{s} sa bo arm geo
incl. - Majority of manuscripts

Luke 18:37

το ορος των Ελαιων (the mountain of Olives) - 1-131-209 X* Γ e
το ορος το καλουμενον Ελαιων (the mountain called Olivet) - Majority of manuscripts
το ορος το καλουμενον των Ελαιων (the mountain called 'Of Olives') - X^{c}

John 14:14

omit - ƒ^{1} X 565 1009 1365 ℓ 76 ℓ 253 b vg^{mss} syr^{s, p} arm geo Diatessaron
incl. - Majority of manuscripts

== Gallery ==
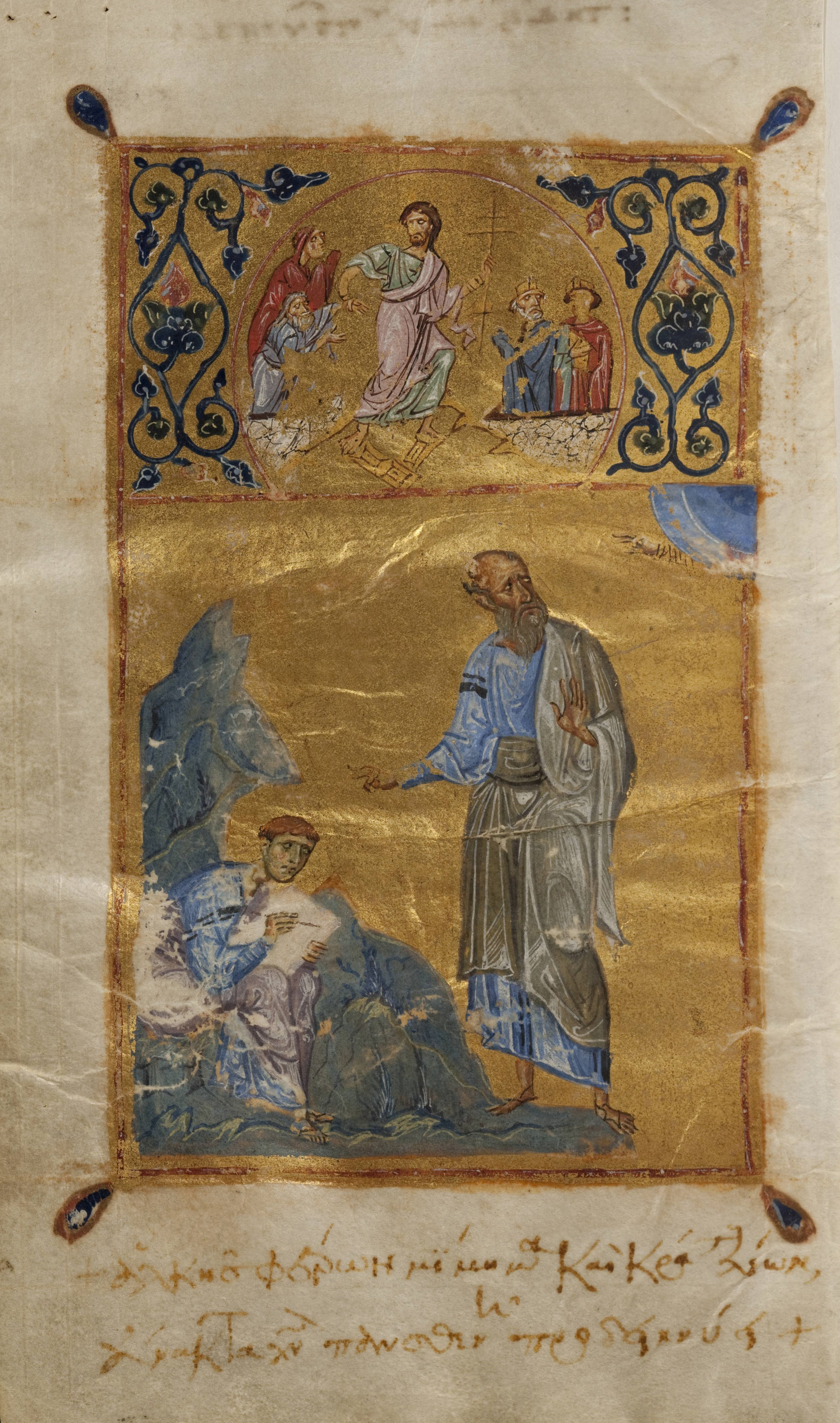
Minuscule 1: Folio 265 verso, portrait of John and Prochor

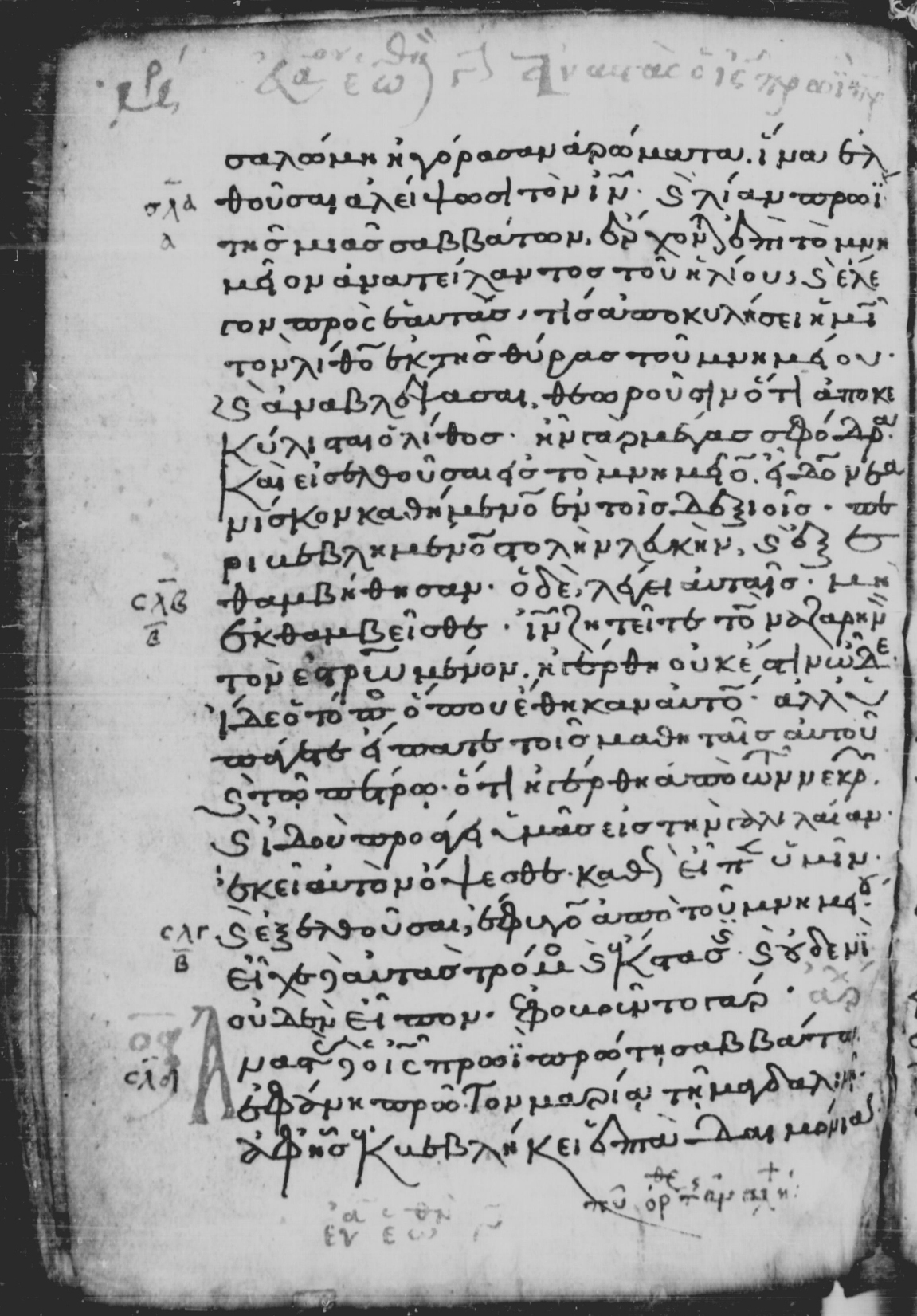
Minuscule 118: Showing verses Mark 16:1-9

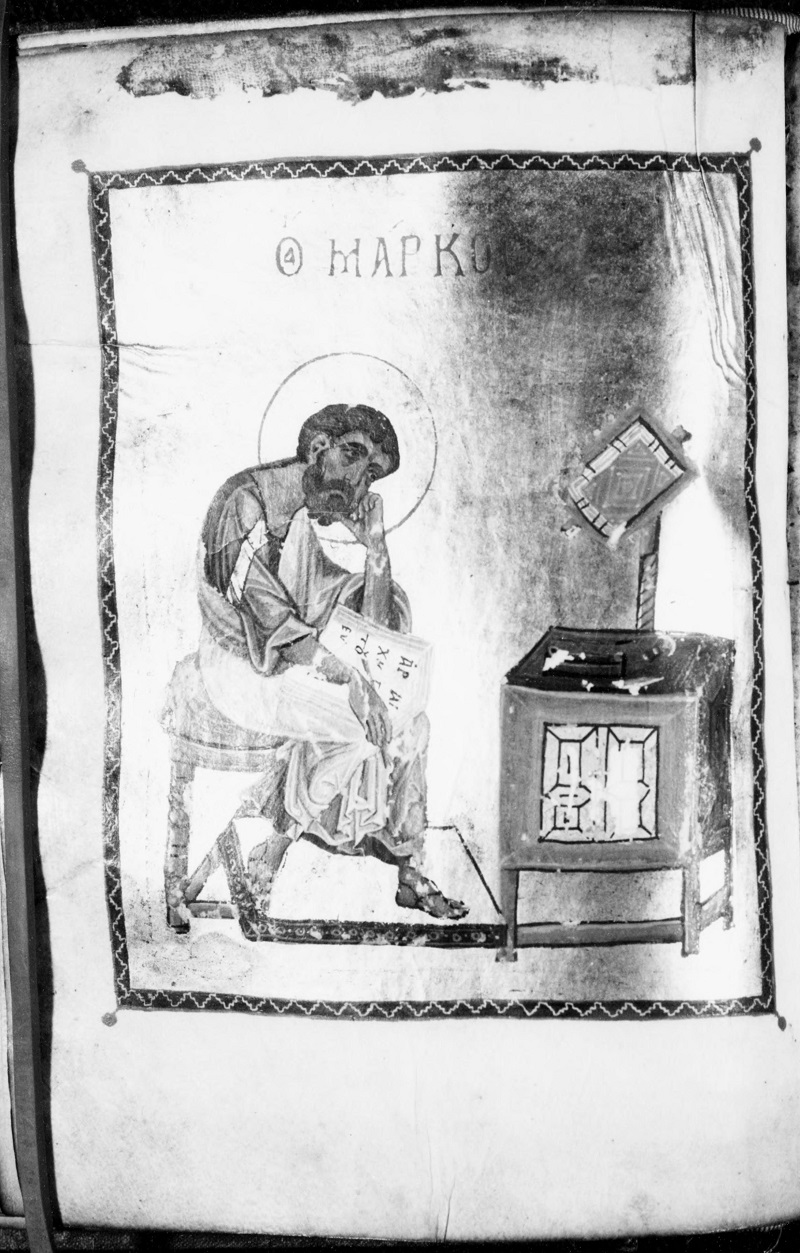
Minuscule 1582: Icon of Mark the Evangelist before his Gospel starts

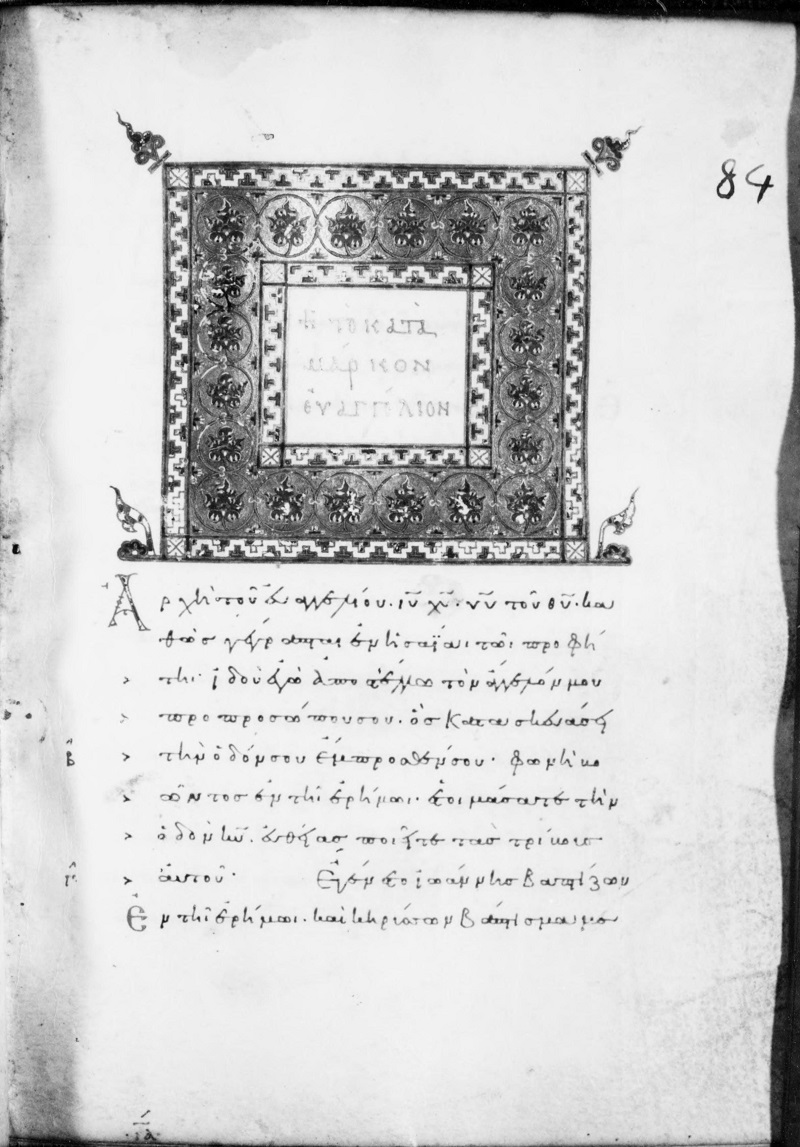
Minuscule 1582: Beginning of Mark's Gospel (Mark 1:1-4)

== See also ==
- List of New Testament minuscules
- Family 13
- Categories of New Testament manuscripts
