= Kirsopp Lake =

English New Testament scholar, historian, and professor (1872–1946)

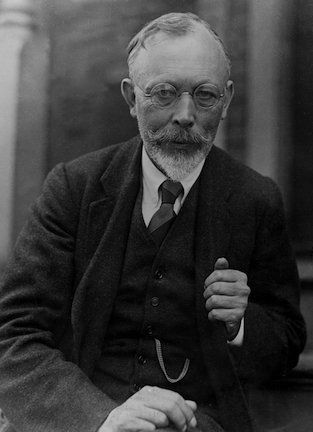
- Born: 7 April 1872; Southampton, England
- Died: 10 November 1946 (aged 74); South Pasadena, California, US
- Education: Lincoln College, Oxford
- Spouses: Helen Courthope Forman; Silva Tipple New
- Awards: Burkitt Medal for Biblical Studies from the British Academy
- Scientific career
- Fields: New Testament, history of Christianity, textual criticism
- Workplaces: Leiden University; Harvard University
- Academic advisors: F. C. Conybeare; J. Rendel Harris
- Notable students: Adriaan de Buck; Erwin R. Goodenough; James Luther Adams

Kirsopp Lake (7 April 1872 – 10 November 1946) was an English New Testament scholar, Church historian, Greek palaeographer, and Winn Professor of Ecclesiastical History at Harvard Divinity School.

He had an uncommon breadth of interests. His main lines of research were the history of early Christianity, textual criticism of the New Testament, and Greek palaeography, in which fields he published definitive monographs. He also studied the historical figure of Jesus and wrote about theology and archaeology (especially in his later life). He edited and translated a two-volume anthology of ancient Christian literature and the first five books of Eusebius' Church History for the Loeb Classical Library.

He is best known for his massive five-volume work The Beginnings of Christianity—an edition, translation, commentary, and study of the Acts of the Apostles—that he conceived and edited with F. J. Foakes-Jackson, and for the ten-volume series of Dated Greek Manuscripts to the year 1200—edited with his second wife, Silva New, one of the leading repertoires of facsimiles of Greek manuscripts. He also published works about Italian monasteries, the textual tradition of the New Testament, and the Caesarean text of the Gospel of Mark.

== Early life ==
Kirsopp Lake was born in Southampton, England, on 7 April 1872, the elder of two surviving children of George Anthony Kirsopp Lake, a physician, and Isabel Oke Clark. His father came from a family of Scottish origin and Kirsopp was the family name of the boy's paternal grandmother. He was educated at St Paul's School, London and then went up to Lincoln College, Oxford, matriculating in 1891. He attended as an Exhibitioner and was the Skinners' Company's Scholar in 1893, finally graduating (B.A., 1895) with a second class in theology. He also attended Cuddesdon Theological College in 1895. He originally had intended to read law and to pursue a career in politics. However, an overdose of exercise, too soon after influenza, affected his heart and he was told by doctors that law and politics were out of the question. According to his son, "he was delicate and the church seemed to give the opportunity for a living and for some influence over the society that interested him."

== Curate in England ==
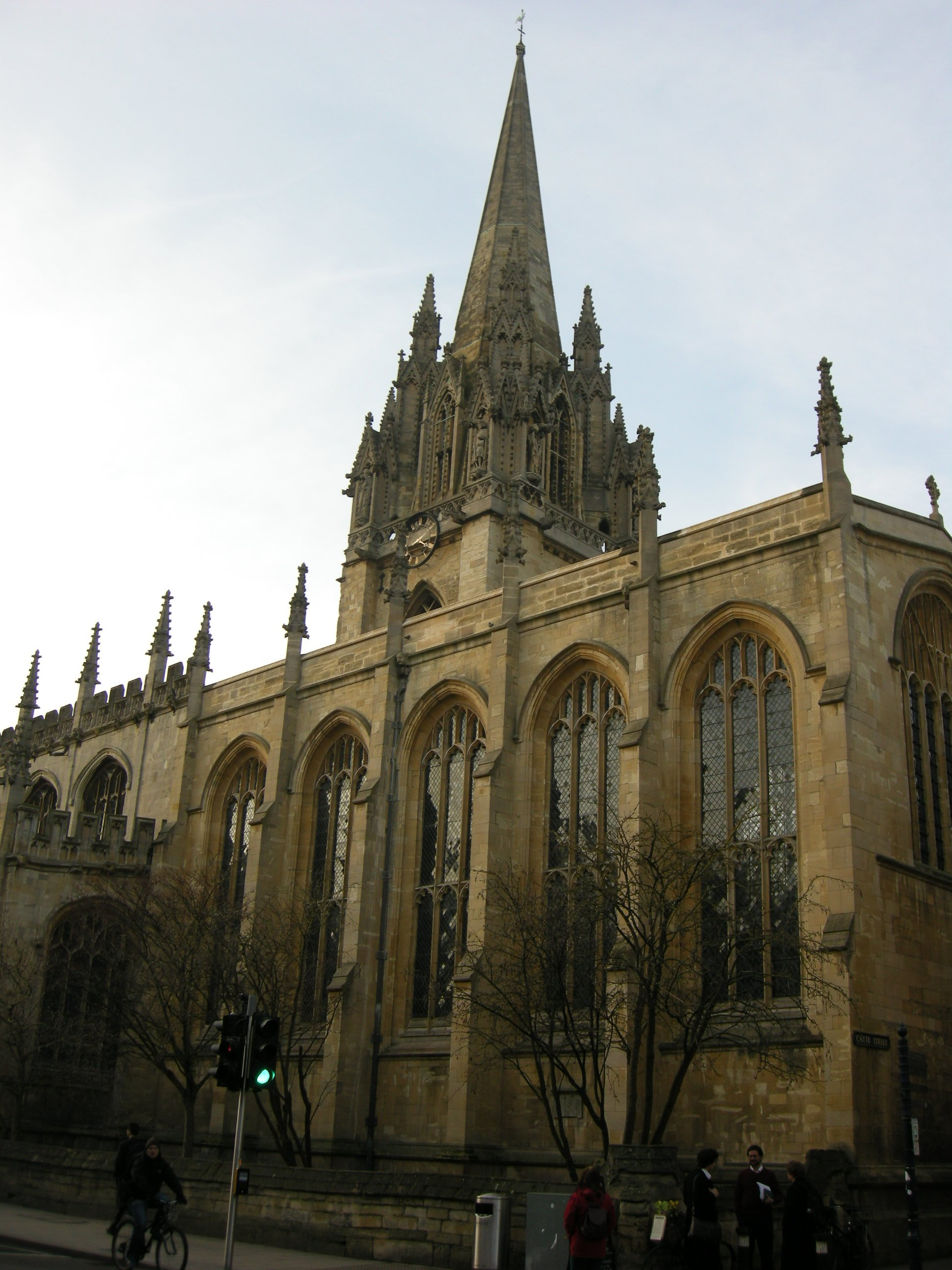
St. Mary the Virgin, Oxford, where Lake was curate 1897–1904.

Following graduation Lake was ordained a deacon in the Church of England (1895) and served as curate in Lumley, Durham, where he preached to the pitmen and miners in that North Country mining district. "I do not believe that theology entered very much into his sermons," recalls his son, "but he did conduct The Mikado and he still tells the story of the brawny pitman who, having rescued him from the attack of a drunken navvy from a neighbouring village and listened to his comments on the situation, said 'Mon, he's no much to look at, but has he no a bonny tongue?!'" After a year's service he was ordained priest (1896); however, he had further issues with his heart and decided to return to Oxford, to the less rigorous climate of the South to improve his health. He earned his M.A. in 1897 and from that year to 1904 he served as curate of St. Mary the Virgin, Oxford, a much more academic atmosphere. During these years, to supplement his income, he also took a job cataloguing Greek manuscripts in the Bodleian Library. That activity aroused in him an interest in the Synoptic problem and matters of New Testament textual criticism, and saw the publication of his first book, the very useful handbook The Text of the New Testament (1900). Some sixty years later Stephen Neill describes the 6th ed. (1928) as "still the best short introduction to New Testament textual criticism that exists in any language." It was most likely the influence exerted over him by F. C. Conybeare, Fellow of University College, Oxford, which was the main factor in Lake's development. It was Conybeare who initiated Lake into the mysteries and problems of New Testament palaeography and textual criticism.

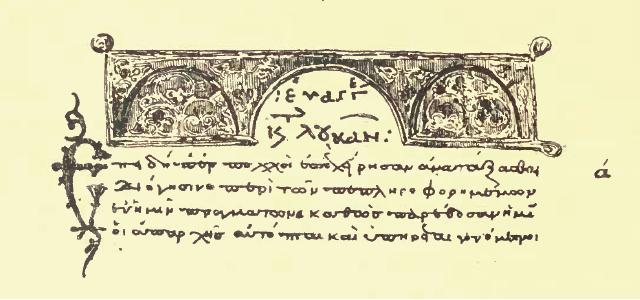
Codex 1 (Luke 1:1–2), whose text Lake published in 1902 along with other readings from Family 1.

Lake's palaeographical interests led him in search of more manuscripts and in 1898 he undertook a trip to the libraries of Basel, Venice, and Rome. The fruits of that trip were published in Codex 1 of the Gospels and Its Allies (1902). Lake had discovered a textual family of New Testament manuscripts known as Family 1 (also known as Lake group). To this family belong minuscules: 1, 118, 131, and 209. In the summers of 1899 and 1903 (and many thereafter) he undertook trips in search of manuscripts to the Greek monasteries on Mount Athos. He published (1903, 1905, 1907) editions of several manuscripts uncovered there, a catalogue of all the manuscripts inspected, and even a history of the monasteries themselves (1909). In 1902 he won the Arnold Essay Prize at Oxford University for his study "The Greek Monasteries in South Italy," which was published in four instalments in the Journal of Theological Studies, vols. 4 and 5.

On 10 November 1903, he married Helen Courthope Forman (1874 – 22 October 1958), the daughter of Freda Gardiner and Sidney Mills Forman, a businessman of Newcastle-upon-Tyne, Northumberland. They had two children, Gerard Anthony Christian Kirsopp Lake (27 December 1904 – 3 September 1972) and Agnes Freda Isabel Kirsopp Lake (31 July 1909 – 3 November 1993). It was also during these later years of his curacy that Lake "began to doubt the teachings of the church and to think in terms of history and exegesis rather than theology and parish difficulties." As his son reports, my father "has often said that the turning point in his belief in the church came when his Vicar suggested that prayers be said at Vespers for a Mr. Brown, since the doctor had just announced that there was no hope for him. The story may be apocryphal but I think it is indicative of his point of view." His daughter Agnes, "in conversations, was less polite and oblique: 'Heresy' was her word, pronounced with glee and gusto." This type of thinking may have run in the family, for Lake told Alfred North Whitehead in 1922 that his father, the physician, "being asked late in life what had done the most in his lifetime to relieve human suffering, answered, 'Anaesthesia and the decay of Christian theology.'"

== Professor in Leiden ==
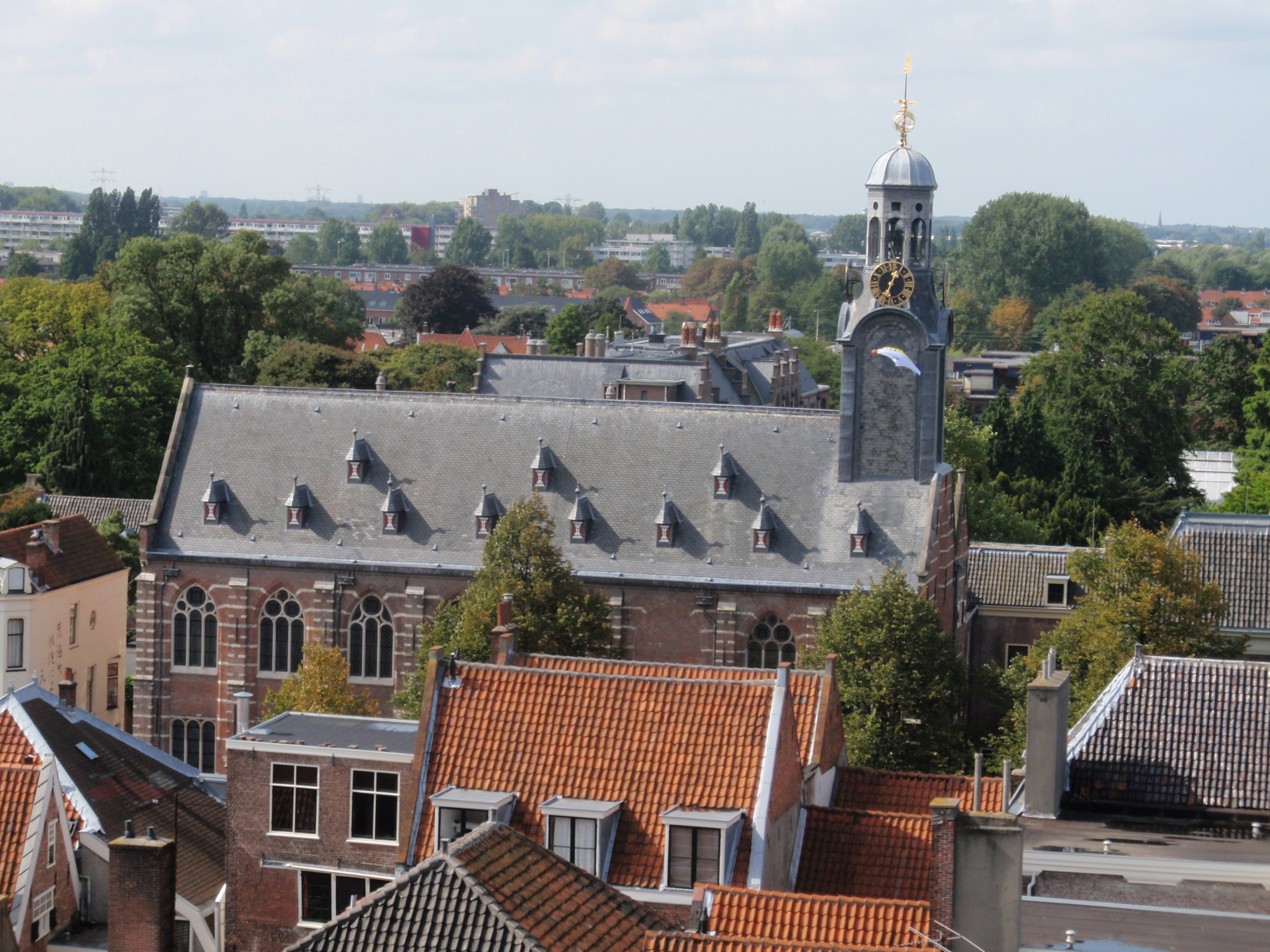
Academy building in Leiden University, where Lake was professor 1904–14.

In line with these new interests and activities, Lake accepted an offer in 1903 to become professor (ordinarius) of New Testament exegesis and early Christian literature at the Leiden University, the oldest university in the Netherlands. He taught there for ten years, from 1904 until 1914. His inaugural lecture, which he delivered in English, was on "The Influence of Textual Criticism on the Exegesis of the New Testament." At the close of the lecture he looked his students in the face. "I am very sorry," he said, "that for a few months I shall be handicapped by my inability to use your language, but I hope that by next September I shall be in a position to lecture in Dutch, at least partially, even though it may be necessary to apologize for frequent solecisms, and for an imperfect pronunciation." He kept his promise and quickly learned to lecture in Dutch. The lecture was published in 1904 and has proven to be a seminal study; though, as Elliott has noted: "It has taken nearly a century for his general thesis that textual variants must be used as an invaluable source for our study of the history of the church to bear fruit in a determined way."

Kirsopp Lake looking back to his Leiden time, in 1923

In addition to his inaugural lecture, Lake published two important books on historical and exegetical matters concerning the New Testament during his time in Leiden: The Historical Evidence for the Resurrection of Jesus Christ (1907) and The Earlier Epistles of St. Paul: Their Motive and Origin (1911). As Metzger explains: "These studies, particularly the latter, revealed Lake's ability to analyze and evaluate complex historical and literary data and to set forth scholarly reconstructions with clarity and a certain persuasiveness." In Historical Evidence Lake sets forth his approach: "The first task of the historical inquirer is to collect the pieces of evidence; the second is to discuss the trustworthiness and meaning of each separate piece; and the third is to reconstruct the events to which the evidence relates" (p. 6). As for the reconstruction, he explains: "In any such attempt it is desirable to remember that the reconstruction of an original tradition from forms of later dates and of divergent contents must be guided by exactly the same principle as is the reconstruction of an original text from a number of extant MSS. In each case the fundamental problem is the retracing of the line of development followed by the various authorities, and the solution depends chiefly on the ability to detect errors of transmission and to explain their existence" (p. 167). As for The Earlier Epistles, Neill writes: "I think that those of us who read Lake when we were young will be inclined to think that this is one of the best books on the New Testament that has ever been written in the English language. This is the way it ought to be done. Under Lake's skillful guidance, we feel ourselves one with those new and struggling groups of Christians, in all the perplexities of trying to discover what it means to be a Christian in a non-Christian world. And there is the Apostle, so very much in working clothes and without a halo; we feel in our bones the passionate eagerness of Paul for better news from Corinth, the passionate relief when the good news arrives." The book brought the conclusions of the German history of religions school to the attention of English-speaking world for the first time, and all later New Testament study has been influenced by this book.

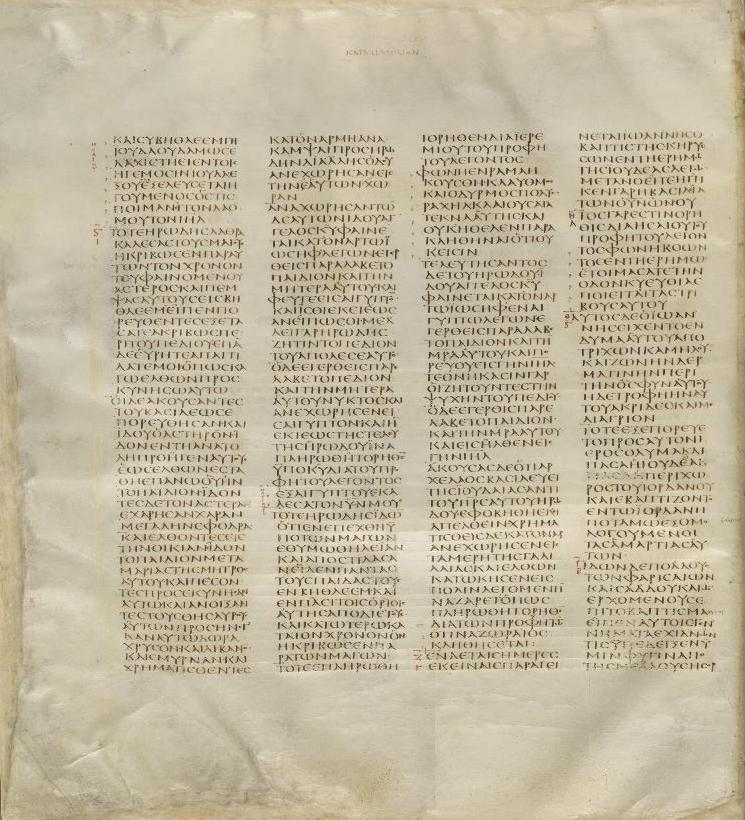
Codex Sinaiticus (Mt 2:5–3:7), from which Lake produced a facsimile edition (1911, 1922).

True to the second component of his professorship, Lake produced a number of works on early Christian literature. He was a member of a special committee of the Oxford Society of Historical Theology charged with investigating the text of the New Testament as it has been preserved in the Apostolic Fathers. His specific responsibility was the Didache and the results of his investigations were published in 1905. For the Loeb Classical Library series he prepared a new edition of the Greek texts of the Apostolic Fathers, which in keeping with the series were furnished with a facing English translation and a short introduction. The finished work was issued in two volumes, Nos. 24 and 25, published in 1912 and 1913. Also during this time he travelled to the Imperial Library of St. Petersburg together with his first wife Helen during the summer of 1908 and photographed the very important Codex Sinaiticus and then published in facsimile the New Testament along with the Epistle of Barnabas and the Shepherd of Hermas (1911) and the Old Testament (1922), following another visit to the library in 1913. These volumes were furnished with valuable introductions and were a marked improvement from the earlier editions of Tischendorf. In 1913 Lake was a favoured candidate for lecturer in theology at Trinity College, Cambridge, but word of his unorthodox views reached the Master of Trinity, Henry Montagu Butler, and the choice in consequence fell on the other candidate Frederick Tennant. Again, in early 1914 some of his friends sought to secure his appointment to a canonry in Westminster Abbey, but the Prime Minister H. H. Asquith, having read Lake's Historical Evidence, decided that he could not nominate him. As his friend H. D. A. Major explained, Lake "would gladly have remained in England. But his intellectual originality combined with the fearlessness of his utterances—he was neither a 'safe man' nor a 'yes man'—proved detrimental to his promotion both in academic and ecclesiastical circles."

== Harvard years ==
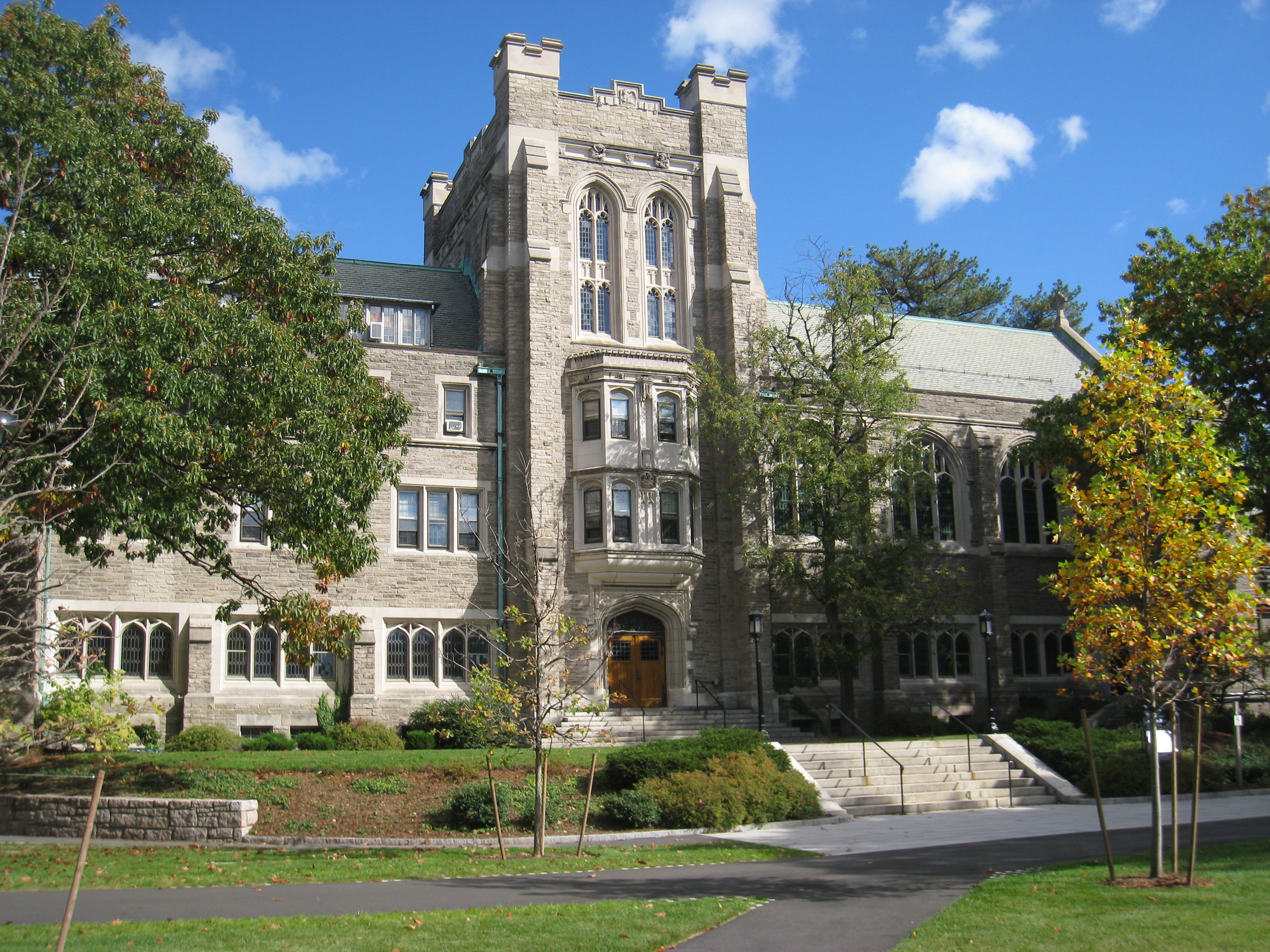
Harvard Divinity School, Andover Hall, where Lake was professor 1914–32.

In the fall of 1913 Lake travelled to the United States to lecture for a year at the Episcopal Theological School in Cambridge, Massachusetts and to deliver the Lowell Lectures in Boston. Just before he was to leave for Europe he was offered a position at Harvard Divinity School, which he accepted. In the announcement of his hiring it was reported: "He comes when there is no definite gap to be filled, but merely because his eminent scholarship could add to the teaching strength of Harvard." From 1914 until 1919 he was professor of early Christian literature. Then in 1919, following the retirement of Ephraim Emerton, he was appointed to a Harvard chair becoming the Winn Professor of Ecclesiastical History, which he held until 1932. From 1915 to 1919 he was also a lecturer in New Testament at Union Theological Seminary in New York City.

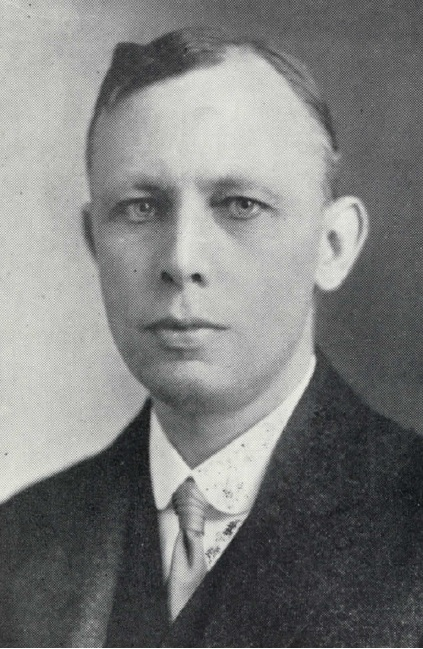
A photograph of Kirsopp Lake, taken around the time of his arrival at Harvard in 1914.

While at Harvard Lake laboured to bring forth the monumental five volume work The Beginnings of Christianity. Beginnings was a project that had been conceived during conversations with F. J. Foakes-Jackson while Lake was still at the Leiden University, sometime before 1912 (vol. v, p. vii). It sought to investigate the view "that Christianity in the first century achieved a synthesis between the Greco-Oriental and the Jewish religions in the Roman Empire. The preaching of repentance, and of the Kingdom of God begun by Jesus passed into the sacramental cult of the Lord Jesus Christ. But the details are complex and obscure. What were the exact elements in this synthesis? How was it effected?" (vol. i, p. vii). The undertaking began at Cambridge University in the form of a seminar, presided over by F. C. Burkitt. It "was largely attended by scholars of the most varied interests in the University, not only theological, but historical, classical, mathematical, and Oriental [...] Lake paid frequent visits from Leiden" and "the United States and Canada were not unrepresented" (vol. v, p. vii). The project was to be a grand endeavour. The five volumes that were ultimately published only comprise "Part I". As they explain: "Before, however, attempting to reconstruct this history we believed it necessary to study Acts in the light of the results of modern criticism. [...] Later on we hope to return to the subject and reconsider the narrative of the life of Jesus, and the influence on the Church of his own teaching and of the teaching of others about him" (vol. ii, p. v). As it turned out they were never able to "return to the subject" and complete the project. "In sum," writes Baird, "The Beginnings of Christianity is a monumental work—the most extensive investigation of a NT book by English-speaking scholarship" (cf. vol. v, p. ix).

During his early years at Harvard, Lake continued to be active with The Churchmen's Union, an Anglican society for the advancement of liberal religious thought. He and Foakes-Jackson lent their support to H. D. A. Major in organising a conference of Modern Churchmen (which continues till this day). The first was held at Ripon, Yorkshire, 3–6 July 1914. Foakes-Jackson and Lake delivered an attack on Liberal Protestantism. Lake said that the task of the liberal Christian is "not to go back upon the inherited Catholic doctrines of the Church, but to apply and to expand them, because we see that in the end they are true so long as you do not limit them." The most famous of the conferences was the one held at Girton College, Cambridge, 8–15 August 1921. Its subject was "Christ and the Creeds" and it was planned as a response to Lake's publication of the first volume of The Beginnings of Christianity. Lake did not attend, so it was left to Foakes-Jackson to defend their positions. He explained that he and Lake believed that the Jesus whom the early Church preached was not "a character of singular charm and beauty during his life on earth, but a Risen Saviour who was expected to come speedily to judge the quick and the dead." Liberal Protestants, he argued, were preaching a Christ who had no historical foundation. From 1915 to 1931 Lake served as one of vice-presidents of the union; however, after 1927 he began to part company with English Modernism and in 1932 he wrote to have his name removed from the list of vice-presidents.

In 1932 Lake's personal affairs produced quite a scandal. On 18 August 1932, Lake obtained a Reno divorce from his first wife Helen, whom he had been separated from for five years.<ref">New York Times, 19 November 1932.</ref> Then, on 16 December 1932, he married his former student and collaborator Silva Tipple New (18 March 1898 – 30 April 1983). She was 26 years his junior, married, with three children. They had one child John Anthony Kirsopp (b. 13 June 1928). At the time Silva was a professor of classics at Bryn Mawr, and an accomplished scholar in her own right. She would continue to collaborate with Lake for the rest of his life. The divorce caused such a stir that Lake was forced to resign the Winn chair on 28 September 1932 and became professor of history in Harvard College, a position he held until his retirement in 1938. Perhaps their most significant project was a magnificent series of ten large albums of facsimiles entitled Dated Greek Minuscule Manuscripts to the Year 1200 (1934–39). These portfolios of reproductions were organised by location and contained photographic specimens of some 400 manuscripts. These were important publications, for they encouraged scholars to look beyond the more well known manuscripts and realise the worth of encompassing a wide range of textual variants in any editing of the Greek text. Together they also founded in 1934 a series of monographs entitled Studies and Documents and contributed a valuable study in 1941 on Family 13 (The Ferrar Group), another New Testament manuscript group.

During his 23 years at Harvard, Lake continuously taught one very popular course, the English Bible, familiarly known as "English 35". When he taught the course for the first time in 1914, the course had less than 40 students, whereas his final year there were over 250—a "625 per cent increase," as the Harvard Crimson touted when announcing his final lecture would be 16 December 1937. His book An Introduction to the New Testament (1937) is a "skeleton of the course." However, "it does not give the flesh put on that skeleton by the lecturer" (p. ix). It was of course that "flesh" which made the course so interesting, due to Lake's lively imagination and engaging wit. As he himself explains: "The most important thing in a teacher's life is not to impart the knowledge of facts—which can be found much better in books—but to encourage another generation to look steadfastly at the vision which it sees, and to face its own problems in the light of that vision, controlled and guided by an understanding of what the past has done or not done" (Paul, His Heritage and Legacy, 1934, p. xii). He seems to have been effective, for James Luther Adams, one of his students during 1924–27, recalls: "It was his characteristic interest to make historical figures come alive, so that we might see their significance today and not merely study them as so many items from a dead past." "Something we all recognized in Kirsopp Lake," writes Adams, "was that he had the imagination of a Sherlock Holmes. He took an almost childlike interest in digging out alternative answers to historical questions [...] Students who thought themselves completely secularized and immune to any 'religious nonsense' attended his lectures and heard him publicly burrow down into the biblical concepts, taking as his point of departure something highly imaginative in one of the parables, and then rise up to fly with it. The students used to call his courses 'Kirsopp's Fables.'"

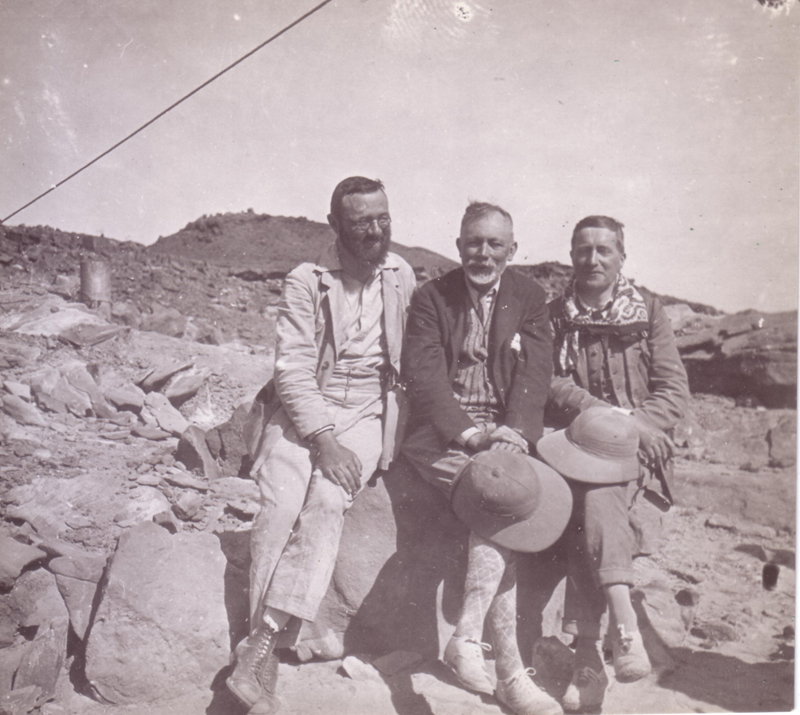
G. A. Barrois, Kirsopp Lake, and A. de Buck on the 1930 Harvard expedition to Serabit el-Khadim.

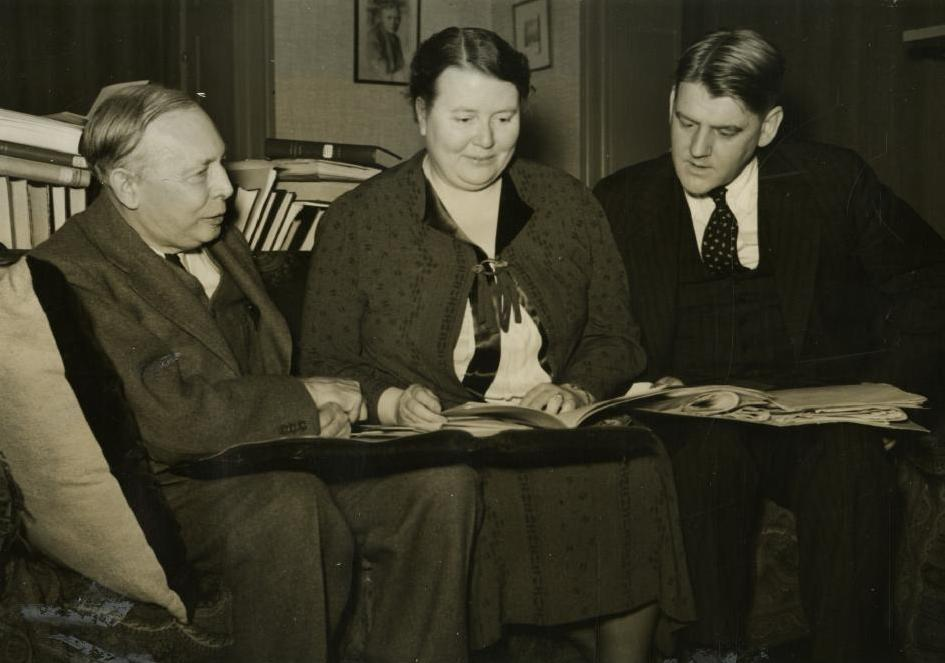
Kirsopp and Silva Lake with Robert P. Casey prior to the Van expedition, 1938.

In later years, Lake became increasingly involved in archaeological expeditions. He had remarkable abilities as an organiser and an uncanny skill in finding the necessary money to fund his various undertakings. In the spring of 1927, with Robert P. Blake, he travelled to Saint Catherine's Monastery in Egypt to study biblical manuscripts. While passing through Cairo they met the Egyptologist Alan H. Gardiner who suggested that on their return they might stop by Serabit el-Khadim, which was in the neighbourhood of the monastery, and attempt to locate a number of previously noticed inscriptions in a Proto-Sinaitic script. As Lake remarked in his account of the adventure: "'in the neighborhood' is a relative matter, for, stated in terms of time instead of space, the monastery was about as far from Serabit as New York is from San Francisco." After a week's journey on camels they were able to locate the site and the inscriptions, as well as identify two additional inscriptions not previously known. "It is a pity that we could not identify the fragments more accurately," Lake noted, "but the temperature in the shade was over 115° Fahr., and the fragments were in the sun and almost too hot to touch" (HTR 21 [1928]: 3–4, 5). Lake would return to further investigate the site, as well as the adjacent temple of Hathor in 1930 on an expedition led by him and Blake, this time accompanied by Silva (his future second wife), at the time a Guggenheim fellow, who would handle the photography. In the results of the expedition that were published in 1932, Lake described the camp: "It was not exactly luxurious, and on two days when it rained it was extremely uncomfortable, as we had to spend the whole time in the cave, in which it was impossible to stand upright except in a few spots. The cooking was shared by Professor Blake and Mrs. [Silva] New, and consisted chiefly of rice, with canned meat dissolved in tomato-sauce and curry-powder" (HTR 25 [1932]: 98–99). A final trip was made in 1935; unfortunately, this time Lake was injured during the trip. He received internal injuries when bumped by a camel, but continued the journey, and was carried by litter to the top of the mountain. After supervising the start of the excavation, his condition worsened and he was rushed to Jerusalem with his wife to receive medical attention. In 1929, Lake approached John Winter Crowfoot of the British School of Archaeology in Jerusalem (BSAJ) about a joint excavation with some other institutions of Samaria, to complete the earlier work of Harvard's George A. Reisner. The new dig began in 1931 and Lake was there for four seasons (1931–34), accompanied again by Silva and Blake. The joint team also included Eleazar Sukenik from Hebrew University and Kathleen Kenyon from the BSAJ. The excavation would yield many important results. As for accommodations in the camp, Kenyon reports that "although they had a hotel-trained Egyptian cook and Palestinian servants to do the washing, the expedition staff lived in tents, sleeping on camp beds" and "the social life of the dig consisted of having cocktails at the end of the day, playing bridge after dinner, and in 1933, listening to jazz records." In 1938–39, Lake along with Silva and Robert P. Casey from Brown University were allowed to conduct a small excavation of Van Fortress in Turkish Armenia. For 15 years he had been seeking permission from the Turkish government to make the expedition. He told the press that until 1937, "the savage tribes of Turkish Armenia, the Kurds, have not been sufficiently pacified for the government to recommend the trip." Details of the expedition were published in 1939.

In addition to the Lowell Lectures, which he delivered at the Lowell Institute and King's Chapel in Boston in 1913, Lake was the Haskell Lecturer at Oberlin College in 1919; the Ingersoll lecturer at Harvard University in 1922; the Ichabod Spencer Lecturer at Union College, Schenectady in 1923; and Flexner Lecturer at Bryn Mawr College in 1932. Lake served as president of the Society of Biblical Literature for two terms, 1941–42. He was elected a member of the American Academy of Arts and Sciences, a corresponding member of the Preussische Akademie der Wissenschaften, and in 1941 honorary fellow of Lincoln College, Oxford. At Harvard, he was made an adopted member of the class of 1894. He received the honorary degrees of D.D. from the University of St Andrews (1911), Th.D. from Leiden University (1922), Litt.D. from the University of Michigan (1926), and PhD from Heidelberg University (1936). Also in 1936 he was awarded the Burkitt Medal for Biblical Studies from the British Academy. Lake was a mason and one of the driving forces in establishing The Harvard Lodge A.F. & A.M., the first academic Masonic Lodge in the country, on 18 May 1922 and served as chaplain.

== Personal life ==
Lake's recreations were golf, chess, and croquet.

Lake's daughter Agnes Kirsopp Lake Michels was a noted classical scholar. In later years she reflected on the impact he had on her life: "my general interests should be attributed mainly to the influence of my father who was a New testament scholar with a classical education and a passionate love of beauty. He told me the stories of the classics and, long before I could understand them, read to me a strange assortment of Browning and the Bible; Swinburne, Tennyson, and Josephus. His attitude to his own work made me think of scholarship as the opening to a world of adventure, not as a retirement from reality."

His grandson Anthony Lake is a diplomat who held high US federal government positions including as National Security Advisor under U.S. President Bill Clinton.

Lake died of arteriosclerotic heart failure at his home in South Pasadena, California on 10 November 1946. He is buried at Glen Haven Memorial Park, San Fernando, California.

== Published works ==
Journals will be shortened according to the following sigla. All entries are arranged in chronological order.

- AJTh = The American Journal of Theology (Chicago)
- AHistR = The American Historical Review (Ithaca, NY. – Oxford)
- ASIA = ASIA. Journal of the American Asiatic Association (New York)
- BiblW = The Biblical World (Chicago)
- ChQR = The Church Quarterly Review (London)
- CPh = Classical Philology (Chicago)
- CR = The Classical Review (Cambridge, UK)
- Exp7 = The Expositor, 7th ser. (London)
- Exp8 = The Expositor, 8th ser. (London)
- ExpT = Expository Times (Edinburgh)
- HJ = The Hibbert Journal (London)
- HThR = Harvard Theological Review (Cambridge, MA.)
- JBiblLit = Journal of Biblical Literature (Atlanta)
- JThS = The Journal of Theological Studies (Chicago)
- RL = Religion in Life (New York)
- RPhTh = Review of Philosophy and Theology
- ThTij = Theologisch Tijdschrift (Leuven)

=== Articles ===
- Lake, K. (1897). "Note on Didache 1, 2, and Acts 15, 20. 29". CR. 11 (3): 147–48. JSTOR 693303.
- Lake, K.; Turner, C. H. (1899). "Some New Members of the 'Ferrar Group' of MSS of the Gospels". JTHS. 1 (1): 117–20. JSTOR 23949331.
- Lake, K. (1900). "The Text of Codex Ψ in St. Mark". JTHS. 1 (2): 290–92. JSTOR 23949347.
- Lake, K.; Brightman, F. E. (1900). "On the Italian Origin of Codex Bezae". JTHS. 1 (3): 441–45. JSTOR 23949360.
- Lake, K. (1902). "The Text of the Gospels in Alexandria". AJTh. 6 (1): 79–89. JSTOR 3154031.
- Lake, K. (1902). "The Practical Value of Textual Variation. Illustrated from the Book of Acts". BiblW. 19 (5): 361–69. JSTOR 3137355.
- Lake, K. (1902). "Chronicle of New Testament Textual Criticism". JTHS. 3 (10): 295–304. JSTOR 23949657.
- Lake, K. (1902). "Dr. Weiss's Text of the Gospels. The Thoughts of a Textual Critic on the Text of an Exegete". AJTh. 7 (2): 249–58. JSTOR 3153730.
- Lake, K. (1903). "The Greek Monasteries in South Italy. I". JTHS. 4 (15): 345–68. JSTOR 23949740.
- Lake, K. (1903). "The Greek Monasteries in South Italy. II". JTHS. 4 (16): 517–42. JSTOR 23949759.
- Lake, K. (1903). "The Greek Monasteries in South Italy. III". JTHS. 5 (17): 22–41. JSTOR 23949789.
- Lake, K. (1903). "Further Notes on Codex k". JTHS. 5 (17): 100–107. JSTOR 23949794.
- Lake, K. (1903). "Some Further Notes on the MSS of the Writings of St. Athanasius". JTHS. 5 (17): 108–14. JSTOR 23949795.
- Lake, K. (1904). "The Greek Monasteries in South Italy. IV". JTHS. 5 (18): 189–202. JSTOR 23949789.
- Lake, K. (1904–1905). "The New Sayings of Jesus and the Synoptic Problem". HJ. 3: 332–41 – via archive.org.
- Lake, K. (1905). "Further Notes on the MSS of Isidore of Pelusium". JTHS. 6 (22): 270–82. JSTOR 23947010.
- Lake, K. (1906). "Tatian's Diatessaron and the Martyrdom of Abo". Exp7. 17 (6): 286. doi:10.1177/001452460601700609. S2CID 221063002 – via SAGE journals.
- Lake, K. (1906). "Galatians II. 3–5". Exp7. 1: 236–45 – via archive.org.
- Lake, K. (1908–1909). "Professor H. Von Soden's Treatment of the Text of the Gospels". RTHPH. 4: 201–17, 277–95.
  - Repr. Edinburgh: Otto Schulze & Co., 1908.
- Lake, K. (1909). "The Date of Q". Exp7. 7: 494–507 – via archive.org.
- Lake, K. (1910). "The Text of the Gospels". Exp7. 9: 457–471 – via archive.org.
- Lake, K. (1910). "The Early Christian Treatment of Sin After Baptism". Exp7. 10: 63–80 – via archive.org.
- Lake, K. (1910). "The Earliest Christian Teaching on Divorce". Exp7. 10: 416–27 – via archive.org.
- Lake, K. (1910). "The Shorter Form of St. Paul's Epistle to the Romans". Exp7. 10: 504–25 – via archive.org.
- Lake, K. (1910). "2 Thessalonians and Professor Harnack". ExpT. 22 (3): 131–33. doi:10.1177/001452461002200306. S2CID 170767454 – via SAGE journals.
- Lake, K. (1911). "The Shepherd of Hermas and Christian Life in Rome in the Second Century". HTHR. 4 (1): 25–46. JSTOR 1507539.
- Lake, K. (1911). "The Debt of the Clergy and Theologians to William James". ThTijd. 44: 526–30.
- Lake, K. (1911). "The Judaistic Controversy, and the Apostolic Council". CHQR. 71: 345–70.
- Lake, K. (1912). "The Date of Herod's Marriage with Herodias and the Chronology of the Gospels". Exp8. 4 (5): 462–77.
- Lake, K. (1913). "The End of Paul's Trial in Rome". ThTijd. 47: 356–65.
- Lake, K. (1911). "The Critical Problems of the Epistle to the Philippians". Exp8. 7 (6): 481–93.
- Lake, K. (1915). "The Theology of the Acts of the Apostles". AJTh. 15 (4): 489–508. JSTOR 3155608.
- Lake, K. (1917). "Simon Zelotes". HTHR. 10 (1): 57–63. JSTOR 1507340.
- Lake, K. (1917). "American, English, and Dutch Theological Education". HTHR. 10 (4): 335–51. JSTOR 1507200.
- Lake, K. (1918). "The Sinaitic and Vatican Manuscripts and the Copies sent by Eusebius to Constantine". HTHR. 11 (1): 32–35. JSTOR 1507391.
- Lake, K. (1921). "The Epistula Apostolorum". HTHR. 14 (1): 15–29. JSTOR 1507659.
- Lake, K. (1921). "Simon, Cephas, Peter". HTHR. 14 (1): 95–97. JSTOR 1507662.
- Lake, K. (1922). "The Problem of Christian Origins". HTHR. 15 (4): 97–114. JSTOR 1507938.
- Lake, K.; Blake, R. P. (1923). "The Text of the Gospels and the Koridethi Codex". HTHR. 16 (3): 269–86. JSTOR 1507787.
- Lake, K. (1923). "A Lost Manuscript of Eusebius's Demonstratio Evangelica Found". HTHR. 16 (4): 396–97. JSTOR 1507676.
- Lake, K. (1923). "The Date of the Slavonic Enoch". HTHR. 16 (4): 397–98. JSTOR 1507677.
- Lake, K. (1924). "The Apostles' Creed". HTHR. 17 (2): 173–83. JSTOR 1507612.
- Lake, K. (1924–1925). "Jesus". HJ. 23 (1): 5–19 – via archive.org.
- Lake, K. (1925). "The Shepherd of Hermas". HTHR. 18 (3): 279–80. JSTOR 1507700.
- Lake, K.; Casey, R. P. (1925). "The Text of the De Virginitate of Athanasius". HTHR. 19 (2): 173–90. JSTOR 1507631.
- Lake, K.; Casey, R. P. (1925). "The Text of the De Incarnatione of Athanasius". HTHR. 19 (3): 259–70. JSTOR 1507608.
- Lake, K.; Blake, R. P. (1928). "The Serâbît Inscriptions. I. The Rediscovery of the Inscriptions". HTHR. 21 (1): 1–8. JSTOR 1507905.
- Lake, K.; Blake, R. P.; New, S. (1928). "The Caesarean text of the Gospel of Mark". HTHR. 21 (4): 207–404. JSTOR 1507865.
- Lake, K. (1928). "The Serabit Expedition of 1930. I. Introduction". HTHR. 25 (2): 95–100. JSTOR 1507940.
- Lake, K.; Lake, S. (1936). "Some Recent Discoveries". RL. 5: 89–102.
- Lake, K. (1939). "The Citadel of Van". ASIA. 39: 75–80.
- Lake, K.; Lake, S. (1943). "The Scribe Ephraim". JBiblLit. 62 (1): 263–68. doi:10.2307/3262232. JSTOR 3262232.

=== Book chapters ===
This section includes entries in encyclopedic works.

- Lake, K. (1905). "Didache". In Oxford Society of Historical Theology (ed.). The New Testament in the Apostolic Fathers. Oxford: Clarendon Press. pp. 24–36.
- Lake, K. (1905). "Baptism (Early Christian)". In Hastings, J. (ed.). Encyclopaedia of Religion and Ethics. Vol. 2. New York: Charles Scribner's Sons. pp. 379–90.
- Lake, K. (1908). "Christmas". In Hastings, J. (ed.). Encyclopaedia of Religion and Ethics. Vol. 3. New York: Charles Scribner's Sons. pp. 601–08.
- Lake, K. (1908). "Epiphany". In Hastings, J. (ed.). Encyclopaedia of Religion and Ethics. Vol. 5. New York: Charles Scribner's Sons. pp. 330–32.
- "Bible: New Testament § 2.2 Text and Versions; and § 2.3 Textual Criticism." . Encyclopædia Britannica. Vol. 3 (11th ed.). 1911. pp. 878–886.
- Lake, K. (1913). "Acts of the Apostles". In Hastings, J. (ed.). Dictionary of the Apostolic Church. Vol. 1. New York: Charles Scribner's Sons. pp. 15–29.
- Lake, K. (1913). "Acts (Apocryphal)". In Hastings, J. (ed.). Dictionary of the Apostolic Church. Vol. 1. New York: Charles Scribner's Sons. pp. 29–39.
- Lake, K. (1913). "Luke". In Hastings, J. (ed.). Dictionary of the Apostolic Church. Vol. 1. New York: Charles Scribner's Sons. pp. 718–22.
- Lake, K. (1918). "Theophilus". In Hastings, J. (ed.). Dictionary of the Apostolic Church. Vol. 2. New York: Charles Scribner's Sons. pp. 568–69.
- Lake, K. (1928). "The Text of the Gospels". In Jackson Chase, Shirley (ed.). Studies in Early Christianity. New York: The Century Co. pp. 21–47.
- Lake, K.; Lake, S. (1933). "The Text of Mark in Some Dated Lectionaries". In Wood, H. G. (ed.). Amicitiæ corolla: a volume of essays presented to James Rendel Harris, D.Litt., on the occasion of his eightieth birthday. London: University of London Press. pp. 147–83.
- Lake, K.; Lake, S. (1940). "The Byzantine Text of the Gospels". In Vicent, Hugues (ed.). Cinquantenaire de l'École biblique et archéologique française de Jerusalem (15 novembre 1890–15 novembre 1940). Mémorial Lagrange. Paris: J. Gabalda. pp. 251–258.
- Lake, K. (1945). "Albert Schweitzer's influence in Holland and England". In Roback, A. A. (ed.). The Albert Schweitzer Jubilee Book. Cambridge, MA.: Sci–Art. pp. 427–39.

=== Books ===
==== Critical editions ====
- Lake, K., ed. (1912). The Apostolic Fathers. Loeb Classical Library, 24. Vol. 1: I Clement, II Clement, Ignatius, Polycarp, Didache, Barnabas. Cambridge; London: Harvard University Press.
- Lake, K., ed. (1913). The Apostolic Fathers. Loeb Classical Library, 25. Vol. 2: the Shepherd of Hermas, the Martyrdom of Polycarp, the Epistle to Diognetus. Cambridge; London: Harvard University Press.
- Lake, K.; Foakes Jackson, F. J. (1920–33). The Beginnings of Christianity. Part I: The Acts of the Apostles. Vol. 1–5. London: Macmillan.
  1. Lake; Foakes Jackson (1920). Prolegomena I. The Jewish, Gentile and Christian Backgrounds.
  2. Lake; Foakes Jackson (1922). Prolegomena II. Criticism.
  3. Ropes, J. H. (1926). The text of the Acts.
  4. Lake; Cadbury, H. J. (1933). English Translation and Commentary.
  5. Lake; Cadbury (1933). Additional Notes to the Commentary.
- Lake, K., ed. (1926). Eusebius. The Ecclesiastical History. Loeb Classical Library 39. Vol. 1: Books I–V. Cambridge, MA. – London: Harvard University Press – William Heinemann ltd.

==== Facsimiles ====
- Lake, K. (1905). Facsimiles of the Athos Fragments of Codex H of the Pauline Epistles. Oxford: Clarendon Press.
- Lake, K. (1907). Facsimiles of the Athos Fragments of the Shepherd of Hermas. Oxford: Clarendon Press.
- Lake, K.; Lake, Helen (1911). Codex Sinaiticvs Petropolitanvs: The New Testament, the Epistle of Barnabas and the Shepherd of Hermas preserved in the Imperial Library of St. Petersburg. Oxford: Clarendon Press.
- Lake, K.; Lake, Helen (1922). Codex Sinaiticvs Petropolitanvs et Friderico-Avgvstanvs Lipsiensis: The Old Testament preserved in the public library of Petrograd, in the library of the Society of ancient literature in Petrograd, and in the library of the University of Leipzig. Oxford: Clarendon Press.
- Lake, K.; Lake, S. (1934–45). Dated Greek Minuscule Manuscripts to the Year 1200. Monumenta Palaeographica Vetera, 1. Vol. 1–10 + 1 vol. of indexes. Boston, MA.: The American Academy of Arts and Sciences.
  1. Lake, K.; Lake, S. (1934). Manuscripts at Jerusalem, Patmos and Athens.
  2. Lake, K.; Lake, S. (1934). Manuscripts in Venice, Oxford and London.
  3. Lake, K.; Lake, S. (1935). Manuscripts in the monasteries of Mount Athos and in Milan.
  4. Lake, K.; Lake, S. (1935). Manuscripts in Paris. Pt. 1.
  5. Lake, K.; Lake, S. (1936). Manuscripts in Paris. Pt. 2, Oxford, Berlin, Vienna and Jerusalem.
  6. Lake, K.; Lake, S. (1936). Manuscripts in Moscow and Leningrad.
  7. Lake, K.; Lake, S. (1937). Manuscripts in Rome. Pt. 1.
  8. Lake, K.; Lake, S. (1937). Manuscripts in Rome. Pt. 2.
  9. Lake, K.; Lake, S. (1938). Manuscripts in Rome. Pt. 3, in Messina, in Naples, and in London.
  10. Lake, K.; Lake, S. (1939). Manuscripts in Florence, Athens, Grottaferrata and the Meteora.

==== Monographs ====
- Lake, K. (1901). The Text of the New Testament. Oxford Church Text Books. London: Rivingtons.
  - 2nd ed. (1902); 4th ed. (1908); 6th ed. (1928), rev. S. New.
- Lake, K. (1902). Codex 1 of the Gospels and its related Texts. Texts and Studies 7.3. Cambridge: University Press.
- Lake, K. (1903). Texts from Mount Athos. Studia Biblica et Ecclesiastica 7. Oxford: Clarendon Press.
- Lake, K. (1904). The Influence of Textual Criticism on the Exegesis of the New Testament: an Inaugural Lecture delivered before the University of Leiden, on 27 January 1904. Oxford: Parker & Sons.
- Lake, K. (1907). The Historical Evidence of the Resurrection of Jesus. London – New York: Williams & Norgate – G. P. Putnam's Sons.
- Lake, K. (1909). The Early Days of Monasticism on Mount Athos. Oxford: Clarendon Press.
- Lake, K. (1911). The earlier Epistles of St. Paul. Their Motive and Origin. London: Rivingtons.
- Lake, K. (1915). The Stewardship of Faith: Our Heritage from Early Christianity. Lowell Lectures 1913–14. New York: G. P. Putnam's Sons.
- Lake, K. (1920). Landmarks in the History of Early Christianity. London: Macmillan & Co., ltd.
  - American ed. 1922, different pagination.
- Lake, K. (1922). Immortality and the Modern Mind. Ingersoll Lecture 1922. Cambridge, MA.: Harvard University Press.
- Lake, K. (1925). The Religion of Yesterday and To-Morrow. Boston – New York: Houghton Mifflin Company.
- Lake, K.; Lake, S. (1932). Six Collations of New Testament Manuscripts. Harvard Theological Studies 17. Cambridge, MA.: Harvard University Press.
- Lake, K. (1934). Paul: His Heritage and Legacy. The Mary Flexner Lectures on the Humanities 1. New York: Oxford University Press.
- Lake, K.; Lake, S. (1937). An Introduction to the New Testament. New York: Harper & Brothers.
- Lake, K.; Lake, S. (1941). Family 13 (The Ferrar Group). The text according to Mark with a collation of Codex 28 of the Gospels. Studies and Documents 11. Philadelphia: University of Pennsylvania Press.

=== Reviews ===
- "Scrivener's Introduction to the Criticism of the New Testament". CR. 10 (5): 263–65. 1896. JSTOR 693444.
- Lake, K. (1896). "The Text of the Gospels". CR. 10 (8): 395–97. JSTOR 690921.
- "F. G. Kenyon, Handbook to the Textual Criticism of the New Testament". BiblW. 21 (3): 229–31. 1903. JSTOR 3141217.
- "The Curetonian Version of the Gospels". HJ. 3: 843–46. 1904–1905 – via archive.org.
- "G. Resch, Das Aposteldecret nach seiner Ausserkanonischen Textgestalt". RTHPH. 1: 385–92. 1904–1905.
- "A. Meyer, Die Auferstehung Christi". RTHPH. 1: 631–35. 1904–1905.
- Lake, K. (1906). "Did Paul Use the Logia?". AJTh. 10 (1): 104–11. JSTOR 3153864.
- Lake, K. (1906). "The 'Ammonian' Harmony and the Text of B". JTHS. 7 (26): 292–95. JSTOR 23947199.
- "A. von Harnack, Sprüche und Reden Jesu". RTHPH. 3: 480–87. 1907–1908.
- "H. A. A. Kennedy, St. Paul and the Mystery-Religions". HTHR. 7 (3): 428–31. 1914. JSTOR 1507047.
- "C. G. Montefiore, Judaism and St. Paul". HTHR. 9 (2): 242–45. 1916. JSTOR 1507373.
- "H. Lietzmann, Petrus und Paulus in Rom". AHistRev. 25 (3): 483–84. 1920. doi:10.2307/1836884. hdl:2027/uc1.$b43110. JSTOR 1836884.
- "E. T. Merrill, Essays in Early Christian History". AHistRev. 30 (2): 340–41. 1925. doi:10.2307/1836665. hdl:2027/mdp.39015026259211. JSTOR 1836665.
- Lake, K.; Lake, Silva (1934). "The Acts of the Apostles". JBiblLit. 53 (1): 34–45. doi:10.2307/3259338. JSTOR 3259338.
- "E. R. Goodenough, By Light, Light: The Mystic Gospel of Hellenistic Judaism". JBiblLit. 55 (1): 90–93. 1936. doi:10.2307/3259698. JSTOR 3259698.
- "P. N. Harrison, Polycarp's Two Epistles to the Philippians". JBiblLit. 56 (1): 72–75. 1937. doi:10.2307/3259640. JSTOR 3259640.
- "E. C. Colwell – H. R. Willoughby, The Four Gospels of Karahissar (2 vols.)". JBiblLit. 56 (3): 272–73. 1937. doi:10.2307/3259617. JSTOR 3259617.
- "F. G. Kenyon, Our Bible and the Ancient Manuscripts". JBiblLit. 60 (3): 329–31. 1937. doi:10.2307/3262632. JSTOR 3262632.
- "H. J. M. Milne – T. C. Skeat, Scribes and Correctors of the Codex Sinaiticus". CPH. 37 (1): 91–96. 1937. JSTOR 264376.
