= Minuscule 209 =

- New Testament manuscript
- Text: New Testament
- Date: 14th/15th century
- Script: Greek
- Now at: Biblioteca Marciana
- Size: 19.5 cm by 12 cm
- Type: Caesarean, Byzantine
- Category: III/V
- Note: member of the f^{1}

Minuscule 209 (in the Gregory-Aland numbering), δ 457 and α 1581 (Soden), is a Greek minuscule manuscript of the New Testament, on parchment. Paleographically it has been assigned to the 14th century, with an exception to the Book of Revelation which was added to the codex in the 15th century. It has marginalia.

== Description ==
The codex contains the whole text of the New Testament on 411 parchment leaves (size 19.5 cm by 12 cm). The text is written in one column per page, in 27 lines per page.

The text is divided according to the κεφαλαια (chapters), whose numbers are given at the margin (also Latin), and their τιτλοι (titles of chapters) at the top of the pages. The text of the Gospels is also divided according to the smaller Ammonian Sections (in Mark 236 Sections). There are no references to the Eusebian Canons.

It contains the Euthalian Apparatus in the Catholic epistles, and Prolegomena to the Apocalypse.

== Text ==
The Greek text of the codex is a representative of the Caesarean text-type in the Gospels and the Byzantine text-type in rest books of the New Testament. Aland placed it in Category III in Gospels and in Book of Revelation. The text of the rest books of New Testament of this codex belongs to Category V.

The text of the Gospels is close to minuscule 205. But they are different in the Acts and the Epistles. It is a member of the textual family f^{1}.

Matthew 10:12 (see Luke 10:5)

It reads λεγοντες ειρηνη τω οικω τουτω (say peace to be this house) after αυτην. The reading was deleted by the first corrector, but the second corrector restored it. The reading is used by manuscripts: Codex Sinaiticus, Bezae, Regius, Washingtonianus, Koridethi, other manuscript of f ^{1}, 22, 1010 (1424), it vg^{cl}.

The manuscript contains the comma Johanneum, which was added into the margin during the 15th century, however it was written in Latin instead of Greek.

== History ==
The manuscript once belonged to Cardinal Bessarion († 1472), who had it with him at the Council of Florence in 1439, and wrote many notes in it.

Hoskier reported in 1929 that Aldus used it to correct the Erasman text in his Greek New Testament of 1518.

It was examined and described by Birch, Engelbreth, Fleck, Rinck, and Burgon. C. R. Gregory saw it in 1886.

It is currently housed at the Biblioteca Marciana (Fondo ant. 10), at Venice.

== See also ==
- List of New Testament minuscules
- Biblical manuscript
- Textual criticism
