= Minuscule 131 =

- New Testament manuscript
- Text: New Testament (except Revelation)
- Date: 15th-century
- Script: Greek
- Now at: Vatican Library
- Size: 23.5 cm by 17.5 cm
- Type: Caesarean text-type
- Category: III
- Note: remarkable variations, member of ƒ^{1}

Minuscule 131 is a Greek minuscule manuscript of the New Testament, written on parchment. It is designated by the siglum 131 in the Gregory-Aland numbering of New Testament manuscripts, and δ 467 in the von Soden numbering of New Testament manuscripts. Using the study of comparative writing styles (palaeography), it has been dated to the 15th century. The manuscript has marginal notes.

== Description ==
The manuscript is a codex (precursor to the modern book format), containing the complete text of the New Testament except the Book of Revelation, made of 233 parchment leaves (sized 23.5 cm by 17.5 cm). The text is written in two columns per page, with 30-38 lines per page.

The text of the Gospels is divided according to the smaller Ammonian Sections (234 in Mark 234, the last in 16:9), but there is no references to the Eusebian Canons (both early divisions of the Gospels into sections.).

The manuscript contains the Epistle to Carpian, the Eusebian tables, the tables of contents (known as κεφαλαια / kephalaia) before each Gospel, although with an unusual arrangement (Matt 74, Mark 46, Luke 57), the liturgical books with hagiographies known as synaxaria and Menologion, subscriptions at the end, along with the numbers of lines (known as στιχοι / stichoi). Lectionary markings and incipits were added by a later hand. It contains many errors of iotacism and many remarkable variations.

The order of books is usual for Greek manuscripts:

- Gospels
- Acts
- Catholic epistles
- Pauline epistles

Within the Pauline epistles, the Epistle to the Hebrews stands before the 1 Timothy.

== Text ==
The Greek text of the codex is considered to be a representative of the Caesarean text-type in the Gospels. It belongs to the textual family ƒ^{1}. This was confirmed by scholar Frederik Wisse using the Claremont Profile Method (a specific analysis of textual data).

Biblical scholar Kurt Aland placed it in Category III of his New Testament manuscript classification system. Category III manuscripts are described as having "a small but not a negligible proportion of early readings, with a considerable encroachment of [Byzantine] readings, and significant readings from other sources as yet unidentified." The manuscript contains many corrections made by the first hand (known as prima manu).

Some notable readings

John 5:1

η σκηνοπηγια (Sukkot) - 131
εορτη των Ιουδαιων (feast of the Jews) - Majority of manuscripts.

1 Corinthians 2:4

πειθοις ανθρωπινης σοφιας και λογοις (plausible human wisdom and words) - 131
πειθοις σοφιας λογοις (plausible words of wisdom) - Majority of manuscripts.

== History ==
The earliest history of the manuscript is unknown. It was given to Pope Sixtus V (1585–1590). It was examined by biblical scholar Andrew Birch in about 1782, and then by biblical scholar Johann M. A. Scholz. According to Scholz he mistakenly stated it has the Book of Revelation and he assigned to it the siglum 66^{r}. Biblical scholar Caspar René Gregory saw it in 1886.

Birch dated the manuscript to the 11th century, Gregory to the 14th or 15th century. It is currently dated by the INTF dated it to the 14th century. It is presently housed at the Vatican Library (shelf number Vat. gr. 360) in Rome.

== See also ==
- List of New Testament minuscules
- Family 1
- Biblical manuscript
- Textual criticism
