= Papyrus 45 =

- New Testament manuscript
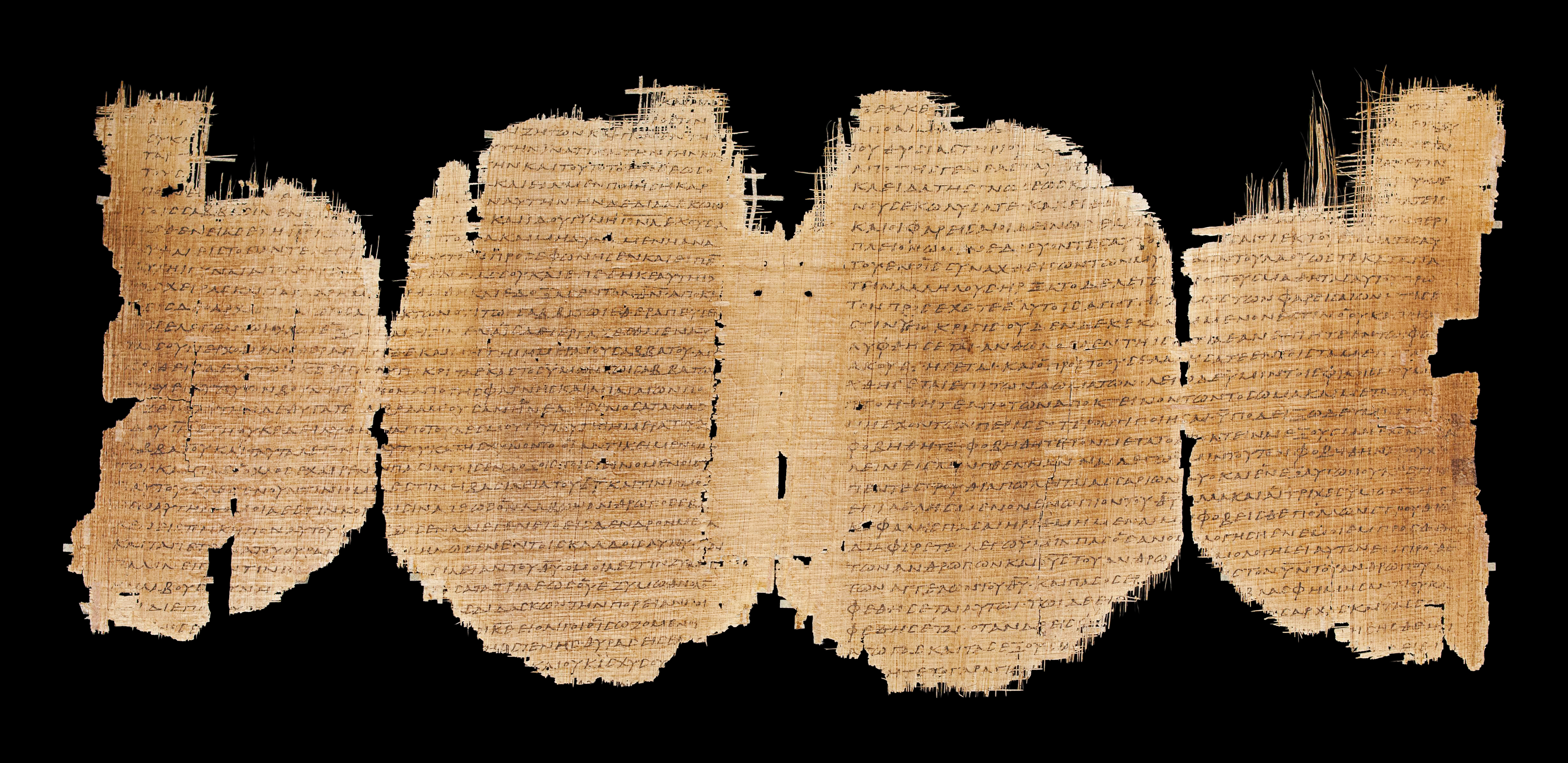
- Folios 13-14 with part of the Gospel of Luke
- Name: P. Chester Beatty I
- Sign: 𝔓^{45}
- Text: Gospels, Acts
- Date: c. ~250
- Script: Greek
- Found: Egypt
- Now at: Chester Beatty Library
- Cite: F.G. Kenyon, The Chester Beatty Biblical Papyri (London: E. Walker), 1933
- Size: 30 leaves; 10 in x 8 in
- Type: eclectic text-type
- Category: I

Papyrus 45 (P. Chester Beatty I) is an early Greek New Testament manuscript written on papyrus, and is one of the manuscripts comprising the Chester Beatty Papyri, a group of early Christian manuscripts discovered in the 1930s, and purchased by business man and philanthropist, Alfred Chester Beatty. It is designated by the siglum 𝔓^{45} in the Gregory-Aland numbering of New Testament manuscripts. Beatty purchased the manuscript in the 1930s from an Egyptian book dealer, and it was subsequently published in The Chester Beatty Biblical Papyri, Descriptions and Texts of Twelve Manuscripts on Papyrus of the Greek Bible by palaeographer, biblical and classical scholar Frederic G. Kenyon in 1933. Manuscripts among the Chester Beatty Papyri have had several places of discovery associated with them, the most likely being the Faiyum in Egypt (the dry sands of Egypt have been a haven for finding very early manuscripts since the late 1800s). Using the study of comparative writing styles (palaeography), it has been dated to the early 3rd century CE. This therefore makes it the earliest example of not only the four Gospels contained in one volume, but also the Acts of the Apostles. It contains verses in fragmentary form from the texts of Matthew chapters 20–21 and 25–26; Mark chapters 4–9 and 11–12; Luke chapters 6–7 and 9–14; John chapters 4–5 and 10–11; and Acts chapters 4–17.

The manuscript is currently housed at the Chester Beatty Library, Dublin, Ireland, except for one leaf containing Matt. 25:41–26:39, which is in the Papyrus Collection of the Austrian National Library in Vienna (Pap. Vindob. G. 31974).

== Description ==
The manuscript is heavily damaged and fragmented. The papyrus was bound in a codex (the forerunner to the modern book), which may have consisted of 220 pages, however only 30 survive (two of Matthew, six of Mark, seven of Luke, two of John, and thirteen of Acts). It was made up of quires of two leaves (four pages) only, which were formed by folding a single sheet of papyrus in half, with the horizontal fibres (due to how papyrus is made from strips of the papyrus plant) facing each other on the inside pages, while the outsides had the vertical fibres. The order of fibres in the quire may thus be designated V-H-H-V, and this sequence is a vital factor in the reconstruction of the manuscript. All of the pages have gaps, with very few lines complete. The leaves of Matthew and John are only extant in small fragments, which have to be pieced together in order to make up a page. The original pages were roughly 10 inches by 8 inches. Unlike many of the other surviving manuscripts from the 3rd century which usually contained just the Gospels, or just the Catholic letters, or just the Pauline epistles, this manuscript possibly contained more than one grouping of New Testament texts. This hypothesis is attributed to the use of gatherings of two leaves, known as a single-quire, whereas most other codices were made from multiple pages in a single quire (all pages put on top of each other, then folded in the middle to make a single block), or of multiple pages split into several quires (groups of 8–10 pages laid on top of each other, then folded in half to make separate blocks), which were then stitched together to make a full volume. It is unknown whether the codex was enclosed in a leather cover or one of another material.

Despite the fragmentary nature, the codex has evidence of the following verses from the New Testament:

Extant Verses in 𝔓^{45}
Book	Chapter and Verse(s)
Matthew	20:24–32; 21:13–19; 25:41–46; 26:1–39
Mark	4:36–40; 5:15–26, 38–43; 6:1–3, 16–25, 36–50; 7:3–15, 25–37; 8:1, 10–26, 34–38; 9:1–8, 18–31; 11:27–33; 12:1, 5–8, 13–19, 24–28
Luke	6:31–41, 45–49; 7:1–7; 9:26–41, 45–62; 10:1, 6–22, 26–2; 11:1, 6–25, 28–46, 50–54; 12:1–12, 18–37, 42–59; 13:1, 6–24, 29–35; 14:1–10, 17–33
John	4:51–54; 5:1–3, 20–25; 10:7–25, 31–42; 11:1–10, 18–36, 43–57
Acts	4:27–36; 5:1–20, 30–39; 6:7–15; 7:1–2, 10–21, 32–41, 52–60; 8:1, 14–25, 34–40; 9:1–6, 16–27, 35–43; 10:1–2, 10–23, 31–41; 11:2–14, 24–30; 12:1–5, 13–22; 13:6–16, 25–36, 46–52; 14:1–3, 15–23; 15:2–7, 19–26, 38–41; 16:1–4, 15–21, 32–40; 17:9–17

== Textual character ==
Because of the extent of the damage, determining the text's relationship to the standard text-type groups has been difficult for scholars (the text-types are groups of different manuscripts which share specific or generally related readings, which then differ from each other group, and thus the conflicting readings can separate out the groups, which are then used to determine the original text as published; there are three main groups with names: Alexandrian, Western, and Byzantine). Kenyon identified the text of the Gospel of Mark in the manuscript as representing the Caesarean text-type, following the definition of the group by biblical scholar Burnett Hillman Streeter. Reverend Hollis Huston criticized Kenyon's transcription of various partially surviving words, and concluded that chapters 6 and 11 of Mark in 𝔓^{45} could not neatly fit into one of the established textual groupings, especially not Caesarean, due to the manuscript predating the distinctive texts for each type from the 4th and 5th centuries. This is due to the definition of a "text-type" being based on readings found in manuscripts dating to after the Edict of Milan (313) by the Emperor Constantine, which stopped the persecution of Christians in the Roman Empire, thus allowing them to make copies of the New and Old Testaments freely, under the auspices of an official copying process. Therefore, these manuscripts were made under a controlled setting, whereas the early papyri weren't, hence the specific text-type groups could be established. The manuscript has a great number of unique (known as singular) readings (this being words/phrases not found in other manuscripts of the New Testament in specific verses). On the origin of these singular readings, E. C. Colwell comments:

"As an editor the scribe of 𝔓^{45} wielded a sharp axe. The most striking aspect of his style is its conciseness. The dispensable word is dispensed with. He omits adverbs, adjectives, nouns, participles, verbs, personal pronouns—without any compensating habit of addition. He frequently omits phrases and clauses. He prefers the simple to the compound word. In short, he favors brevity. He shortens the text in at least fifty places in singular readings alone. But he does not drop syllables or letters. His shortened text is readable."

=== Textual relationship with other New Testament manuscripts ===
𝔓^{45} has a relatively close statistical relationship with Codex Washingtonianus (W) in Mark (this being their unique readings shared with each other, albeit not with other manuscripts), and to a lesser extent those manuscripts within the textual-family group Family 13. Citing biblical scholar Larry Hurtado's study, Text-Critical Methodology and the Pre-Caesarean Text: Codex W in the Gospel of Mark, text-critic Eldon Jay Epp has agreed that there is no connection to a Caesarean or pre-Caesarean text in Mark. There is also no strong connection to the Alexandrian text as seen in Codex Vaticanus (B), the Western text as evidenced by Codex Bezae (D), or the Byzantine text as witnessed by the Textus Receptus. Another hypothesis is that 𝔓^{45} comes from the Alexandrian tradition, but has many readings intended to "improve" the text stylistically, and a number of harmonizations. While still difficult to place historically in a category of texts, contrary to Kenyon, including 𝔓^{45} as a representative of the Caesarean text-type has been undermined.

The textual relationship of the manuscript varies from book to book. In Mark, an analysis of the various readings noted in the textual apparatus of the United Bible Society's Greek New Testament (4th ed.) (a critical edition of the Greek New Testament which has, based on scientific principles, attempted to reconstruct the original text from available ancient manuscripts), places 𝔓^{45} in a group which includes W (for chapters 5-16), Codex Koridethi (Θ), textual group Family 1, and the minuscules 28, 205, 565; the Sinaitic Syriac manuscript, Armenian manuscripts of the New Testament, and Georgian manuscript versions of the New Testament; and the quotations of the New Testament found in early church writer Origen's works. This group corresponds to what Streeter called an "Eastern type" of the text. In Luke, an eleven-way PAM partition (a specific analytical-method) based on Greek manuscript data, associated with the Institute for New Testament Textual Research's (INTF) Parallel Pericopes volume places the manuscript in a group with Codex Ephraemi Rescriptus (C), Codex Regius (L), Codex Zacynthius (Ξ), and the minuscules 33, 892, and 1241. In Acts the Alexandrian text-type is its closest textual relationship.

It is calculated that the codex omitted the Pericope Adulterae (John 7:53–8:11).

=== Some notable readings ===
Below are some readings of the manuscript which agree or disagree with variant readings in other Greek manuscripts, or with varying ancient translations of the New Testament. See the main article Textual variants in the New Testament.

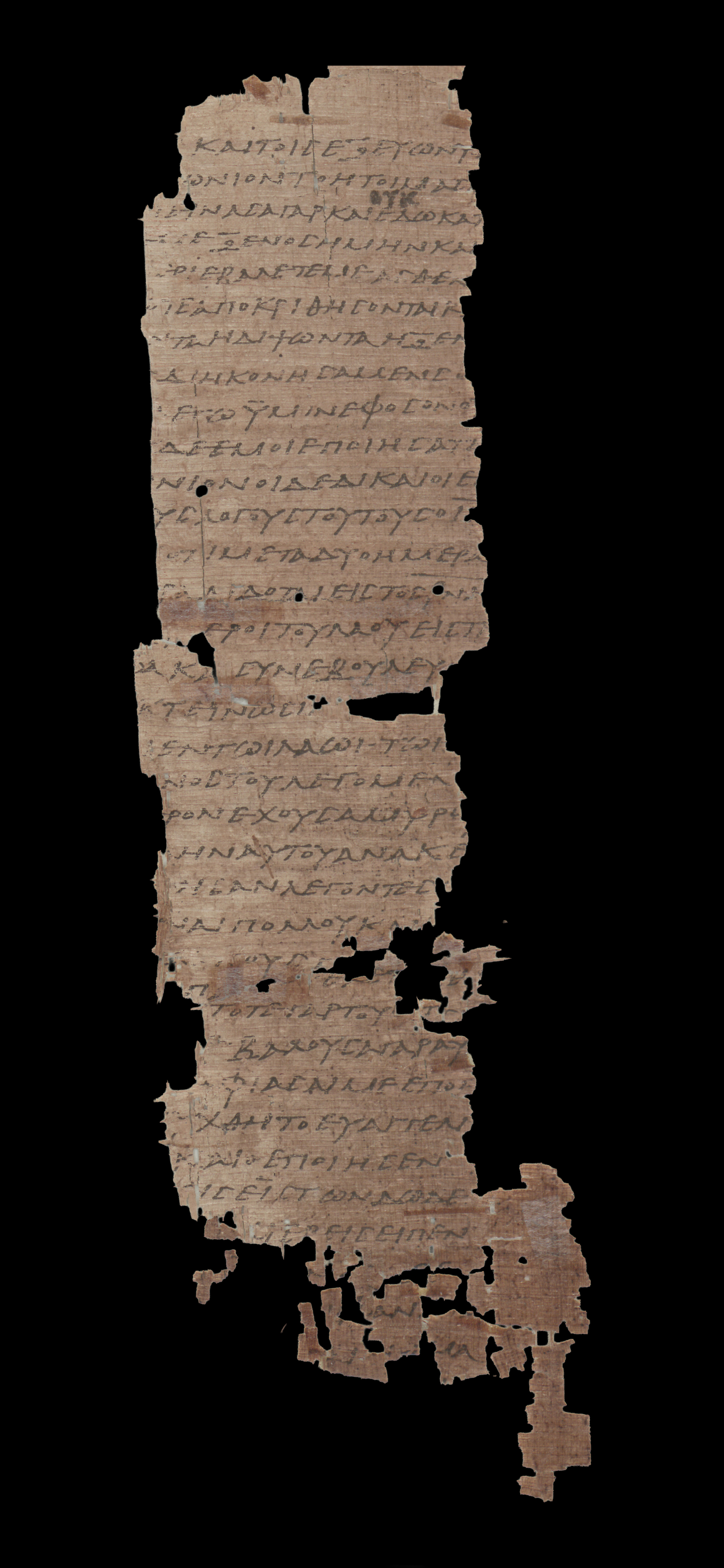
Matthew 25:41–46 in Papyrus 45

Matthew 26:34

ἀλεκτοροφωνίας (rooster crows): 𝔓^{37}^{vid} 𝔓^{45} L ƒ^{1} 2886
ἀλέκτορα φωνῆσαι (rooster has crowed): א B D W 33 𝔐

Mark 6:40

κατὰ ἑκατὸν καὶ κατὰ πεντήκοντα (by hundreds and by fifties):

Omit. : 𝔓^{45} sy^{vf} sy^{h(ms)}
Incl. : א B D (ἀνὰ ἑκατὸν καὶ ἀνὰ – L Θ ƒ^{1 13} 28 565 579 700 892 1424 𝔐)

Mark 6:44

τοὺς ἄρτους (the loaves of bread):

Omit. : 𝔓^{45} א D W Θ ƒ^{1 13} 28 565 700 2542 lat cop
Incl. : A B L 33 𝔐 it^{c f} sy^{p h} bo

Mark 6:45

εἰς τὸ πέραν (to the other side):

Omit. : 𝔓^{45} W ƒ^{1} 118 it^{q} syr^{s}
Incl. : Majority of manuscripts

Mark 8:12

λέγω ὑμῖν (I say to you):

Omit. : 𝔓^{45} W
Incl. (without ὑμῖν): B L 892 pc
Incl. (full): Majority of manuscripts

Mark 8:15

των Ηρωδιανων (of the Herodians): 𝔓^{45} W Θ ƒ^{1 13} 28 565 1365 2542 it^{i k} cop sa^{mss} arm geo
Ἡρῴδου (of Herod): Majority of manuscripts

Mark 8:35

ἐμοῦ καὶ (my, and):

Omit. : 𝔓^{45} D 28 700 it^{a b d i k n r^{1}} syr^{s} arm Origen
Incl. : Majority of manuscripts

Mark 9:27

καὶ ἀνέστη (and stood up):

Omit. : 𝔓^{45}^{(vid)} W it^{k l} sy^{s p}
Incl. : Majority of manuscripts

Luke 6:48

διὰ τὸ καλῶς οἰκοδομῆσθαι αὐτήν (because it had been well built): 𝔓^{75}^{vid} א B L W Ξ 33 157 579 892 1241 1342 2542 sy^{hmg} sa bo^{pt}
τεθεμελίωτο γὰρ ἐπὶ τὴν πέτραν (for it had been built upon the rock): A C D Θ Ψ ƒ^{1 13} 700^{c} Byz latt syr^{p h} cop bo^{pt} arm geo goth
Omit. : 𝔓^{45}^{vid} 700* syr^{s}

Luke 11:33

οὐδὲ ὑπὸ τὸν μόδιον (nor under a basket):

Omit. : 𝔓^{45} 𝔓^{75} L Γ Ξ 070 ƒ^{1} 22 69 700* 788 1241 2542 syr^{s} cop arm geo
Incl. : א A B C D W Θ Ψ ƒ^{13} 𝔐 latt sy^{(c p) h}; (Cl)

Luke 11:44

γραμματεις και Φαρισαιοι υποκριται (scribes and Pharisees, hypocrites!):

Omit. : 𝔓^{45} 𝔓^{75} א B C L ƒ^{1} 33 1241 2542 it^{a aur c e ff^{2} l} vg syr^{s c} sa cop bo^{pt} arm geo
Incl. : A (D) W Θ Ψ ƒ^{13} 𝔐 it sy^{p h} bo^{pt}

Luke 11:54

ινα κατηγορησωσιν αυτου (so they might catch him):

Omit. : 𝔓^{45} 𝔓^{75} א B L 579 892* 1241 2542 syr^{s c} co
Incl. : A C (D) W Θ Ψ ƒ^{1 13} 33 𝔐 lat vg sy^{(p) h}

Luke 12:9

Omit. verse: 𝔓^{45} it^{e} syr^{s} bo^{ms}
Incl. verse: Majority of manuscripts

Luke 12:47

μὴ ἑτοιμάσας ἢ (or prepared, or):

Omit. : 𝔓^{45}
Incl. : Majority of manuscripts

John 11:7

τοῖς μαθηταῖς (to the disciples):

Omit. : 𝔓^{45} 𝔓^{66}* it^{e l}
Incl. : 𝔓^{6}^{(vid)} 𝔓^{66}^{(c)} 𝔓^{75} א A B D K Γ Δ L W Θ Ψ 0250 ƒ^{13} ℓ 844 ''al lat syr co ƒ^{1} 33 𝔐

John 11:25

καὶ ἡ ζωή (and the life):

Omit. : 𝔓^{45} it^{1} syr^{s} Diatessaron syr Cyprian
Incl. : Majority of manuscripts

John 11:51

τοῦ ἐνιαυτοῦ ἐκείνου (of that year):

Omit. : 𝔓^{45} it^{e l} syr^{s}
Incl. : Majority of manuscripts

Acts 5:37

πάντες (all):

Omit. : 𝔓^{45} D it
Incl. : Majority of manuscripts

Acts 8:18

το αγιον (the Holy):

Omit. : א A^{c} B sa mae
Incl. : 𝔓^{45} 𝔓^{74} A* C D E Ψ 33 1739 Byz latt syr cop bo

Acts 9:17

Ἰησοῦς (Jesus):

Omit. : 𝔐
Incl. : 𝔓^{45} 𝔓^{74} א A B C E Ψ 33 81 323 614 945 1175 1739

Acts 9:21

οἱ ἀκούοντες (those who heard):

Omit. : 𝔓^{45} 𝔓^{74} Ψ* pc
Incl. : Majority of manuscripts

Acts 9:38

δύο ἄνδρας (two men):

Omit. : 𝔐
Incl. : 𝔓^{45} 𝔓^{74} א A B C E Ψ 36 81 323 614 945 1175 1739 latt syr co

Acts 10:10

ἐγένετο (became): 𝔓^{74}^{(vid)} א A B C 36 81 323 453 945 1175 1739 Origen
επεπεσεν (fell upon): E Ψ 33 Byz latt syr
ηλθεν (came): 𝔓^{45}

Acts 10:13

Πέτρε (Peter):

Omit. : 𝔓^{45} gig Clement Ambrose
Incl. : Majority of manuscripts

Acts 10:16

εὐθὺς (immediately):

Omit. : 𝔓^{45} 36 453 1175 2818 it^{d} syr^{p} sa^{mss} bo^{ms}
Incl. : 𝔓^{74} א A B C E 81 pc vg sy^{h(mg)} bo

παλιν (again): (D) Ψ 33^{(vid)} 323 614 945 1241 1505 1739 𝔐 it^{p} sy^{h} sa^{mss} mae

Acts 10:33

κυρίου (Lord): 𝔓^{45}^{(vid)} א A B C E Ψ 81* 323 614 945 1175 1739 lat syr^{h} bo
θεου (God): 𝔓^{74} D Byz syr^{p} sa mae bo^{ms}

Acts 11:12

μηδὲν διακρίναντα (making no distinction):

Omit. : 𝔓^{45} D it^{l p*} syr^{h}
Incl. : א(*) A B (E Ψ) 33 81 945 (1175) 1739 al

Acts 13:48

κυρίου (of the Lord): 𝔓^{45} 𝔓^{74} א A C Ψ 33 1739 Byz gig vg sa^{mss} mae
θεου (of God): B D E 049 323. 453 sa^{ms} bo
θεον (to God): 614 syr pc

Acts 13:49

τοῦ κυρίου (of the Lord):

Omit. : 𝔓^{45} pc
Incl. : Majority of manuscripts

Acts 15:20

τῆς πορνείας (from sexual immorality):

Omit. : 𝔓^{45}
Incl. : Majority of manuscripts

Acts 15:40

κυρίου (Lord): 𝔓^{74} א A B D 33 81 it^{d} vg^{st} sa
θεου (God): 𝔓^{45} C E Ψ 1739 Byz gig it^{w} vg^{cl} syr bo

Acts 16:32

κυρίου (Lord): 𝔓^{45} 𝔓^{74} א^{2} A C (D) E Ψ 33 1739 Byz lat syr cop
θεου (God): א* B pc

Acts 17:13

καὶ ταράσσοντες (and stirring up):

Omit. : 𝔓^{45} E Byz
Incl. : 𝔓^{74} א A B D(*) (Ψ) 33 36 81 323 614 945 1175 1505 1739 al lat syr sa (bo)

== Facsimile edition ==
In November 2020, the Center for the Study of New Testament Manuscripts in conjunction with Hendrickson Publishers released a new 1:1 high-resolution imaged facsimile edition of 𝔓^{45} on black and white backgrounds, along with 𝔓^{46} and 𝔓^{47}.

== See also ==
- List of New Testament papyri
- Chester Beatty Papyri
