= Caesarean text-type =

New Testament text type

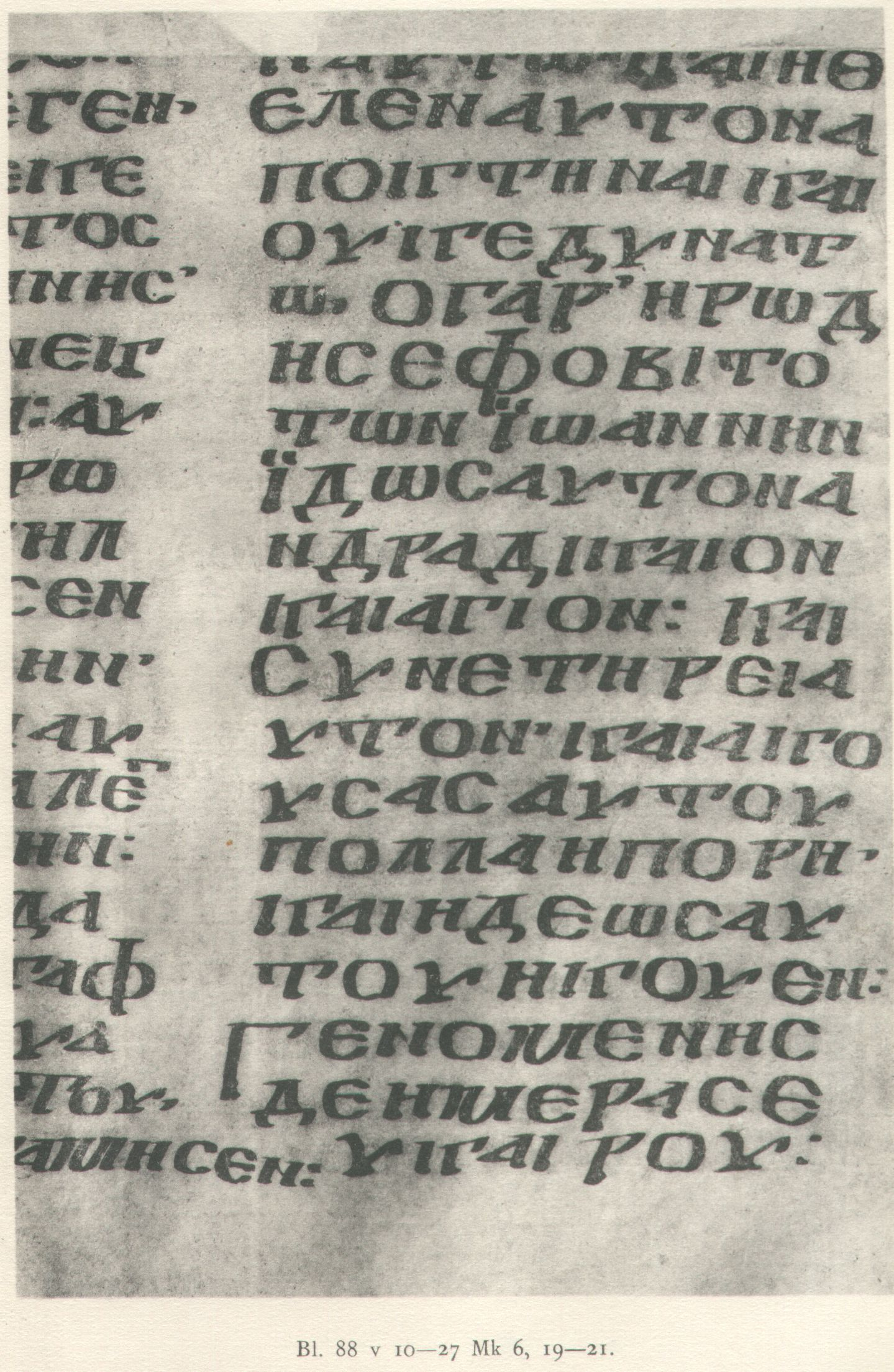
Codex Coridethianus

In textual criticism of the New Testament, Caesarean text-type is the term proposed by certain scholars to denote a consistent pattern of variant readings that is claimed to be apparent in certain Koine Greek manuscripts of the four Gospels, but which is not found in any of the other commonly recognized New Testament text types (Byzantine, Western and Alexandrian).

In particular a common text type has been proposed to be found: in the ninth/tenth century Codex Koridethi; in Codex Basilensis A. N. IV. 2 (a Greek manuscript of the Gospels used sparingly by Erasmus in his 1516 printed Koine New Testament); and in those Gospel quotations found in the third century works of Origen, which were written after he had settled in Caesarea. The early translations of the Gospels in Armenian and Georgian also appear to witness to many of the proposed characteristic Caesarean readings, as do the small group of minuscule manuscripts classed as Family 1 and Family 13. However, some text critics such as Kurt and Barbara Aland have disputed the existence of a Caesarean text-type.

== Description ==
A particularly distinctive common reading of the proposed text-type is in Matthew 27:16-17, where the bandit released by Pontius Pilate instead of Jesus is named as "Jesus Barabbas" rather than—with all other surviving witnesses—just "Barabbas". Origen notes particularly that the form "Jesus Barabbas" was common in manuscripts in Caesarea, whereas he had not found this reading in his previous residence in Alexandria. Otherwise the Caesarean readings have a mildly paraphrastic tendency that seems to place them between the more concise Alexandrian, and the more expansive Western text-types. None of the surviving Caesarean manuscripts is claimed to witness a pure type of text, as all appear to have been to some degree assimilated with readings from the Byzantine text-type.

Some writers have questioned the validity of this grouping, claiming that the classification is the result of poor research. Insofar as the Caesarean text-type does exist, then it does so only in the Gospels, with most studies focusing on readings in Mark; the text-type is not so well defined in Matthew, Luke and John. The proposed Caesarean witnesses do not appear to have any common distinctive readings in the rest of the New Testament. Some of the Caesarean manuscripts have the so-called Jerusalem Colophon.

The Caesarean text-type was discovered and named by Burnett Hillman Streeter in 1924. According to some scholars such as Kurt and Barbara Aland, it is only a hypothetical text-type. There are no pure Caesarean manuscripts. In many cases, it is difficult to decide the original reading of the group, for instance in Mark 1:16:

αμφιβαλλοντας τα δικτυα — ƒ^{13} 565.
αμφιβληστρα βαλλοντας — ƒ^{1}
αμφιβληστρον βαλλοντας — 700.
βαλλοντας αμφιβληστρον — 28.

Classification siglia

- H. von Soden — Iota (Jerusalem) (I), in part (most strong "Caesarean" witnesses are found in Soden's I^{α} group, with family 1 being his I^{η} and family 13 being I^{ι}).
- Kirsopp Lake, an outstanding British textual critic, developed the hypothesis of the relationship between ƒ^{1}, ƒ^{13}, Θ, 565, 700, and 28. Streeter carried Lake's work further by pointing to Caesarea as the original location of the family.
- F. G. Kenyon — Gamma (γ)
- M. J. Lagrange — C

== Supposed witnesses ==
The earliest potential witnesses to something alike the Caesarean manuscripts are Papyrus 45 (𝔓^{45}) and some of the (now non-existent) manuscripts used by Origen. According to biblical scholar Teofilio Ayuso, 𝔓^{45} and the quotations of Origen count as "proto-Caesarean", however the full Caesarean text only appears later in manuscripts such as Koridethi (Θ) and the early Armenian and Georgian manuscripts. Notwithstanding this association of 𝔓^{45} and a "proto" or "pre-Caesarean" text-type, biblical scholar Larry Hurtado quashed any sort of affiliation between 𝔓^{45} and the Caesarean text-type. He argued only that 𝔓^{45} and Codex Washingtonianus (W) had a close relationship in the Gospel of Mark, but not with any other witness considered to represent the Caesarean text-type. Therefore, Hurtado states "the 'pre-Caesarean' witnesses are not Caesarean at all," and accordingly 𝔓^{45} and W "[do] not belong to any major text-type."

Sign
Name
Date
Content
Θ (038)
Codex Koridethi
9th
Mark
565.
Minuscule 565
9th
Gospels
28.
Minuscule 28
11th
Gospel of Mark
700.
Minuscule 700
11th
Gospels
1.

and rest of ƒ^{1}

Minuscule 1,

118, 131, 209

12th

11th-15th

only Gospels
13.

and rest of ƒ^{13}

Minuscule 13,

69, 124, 346

13th

11th-15th

Gospels

only Gospels

Other manuscripts

𝔓^{29}, 𝔓^{38}, 𝔓^{41}, 𝔓^{48}, Uncial 0188, 174, 230, 406 (?), 788, 826, 828, 872 (only in Mark), 1071, 1275, 1424 (only in Mark), 1604, 2437, ℓ 32.

== Textual features ==
(Apparent Caesarean witnesses in Bold)

Matthew 8:13

και υποστρεψας ο εκατονταρχος εις τον οικον αυτου εν αυτη τη ωρα ευρεν τον παιδα υγιαινοντα (and when the centurion returned to his house in that hour, he found the slave well) - א C (N) Θ (0250) ƒ^{1} (33. 1241.) g^{1} syr^{h}
omit. - Majority of MSS

Matthew 13:35

δια Ησαιου του προφητου (through Isaiah the prophet) – Θ ƒ^{1} ƒ^{13} 33.
δια του προφητου (through the prophet) — Majority of MSS

Matthew 20:23

και το βαπτισμα ο εγω βαπτιζομαι βαπτισθησεσθε (and be baptized with the baptism that I am baptized with) - Majority of MSS
omit. — א B D L Z Θ 085 ƒ^{1} ƒ^{13} it syr^{s, c} sa

Matthew 27:16–17

Ιησουν τον Βαραββαν (Jesus Barabbas) — Θ ƒ^{1} 700.* syr^{s, pal} arm geo
τον Βαραββαν (Barabbas) — Majority of MSS

Mark 8:14

ενα μονον αρτον εχοντες (only having one loaf) — 𝔓^{45} Θ ƒ^{1} 565. 700 k sa
omit — Majority of MSS

Mark 8:15

των Ηρωδιανων (of the Herodians) — 𝔓^{45} W Θ ƒ^{1} ƒ^{13} 28. 565. 1365. i k cop^{sa} arm geo
Ηρωδου (of Herod) — majority of mss

Mark 8:17

εν ταις καρδιαις υμων, ολιγοπιστοι (in your hearts, Oh little-faithed ones) — Θ 28. 565. 700. pc syr^{h}
omit. - Majority of MSS

Mark 9:29

προσευχη και νηστεια (prayer and fasting) — 𝔓^{45} A C D L W Θ Ψ ƒ^{1} ƒ^{13} Majority of MSS
προσευχη (prayer) — א B 0274 k

Mark 10:19

μη αποστερησης (do not defraud) — א A B^{2} C D X Θ 565. 892. 1009. 1071. 1195. 1216. 1230. 1241 1253. 1344. 1365. 1646. 2174. Byz Lect
omit. — B* K W Δ Ψ ƒ^{1} ƒ^{13} 28 700 1010. 1079. 1242. 1546. 2148. ℓ 10 ℓ 950 ℓ 1642 ℓ 1761 syr^{s} arm geo

Mark 12:1

ανθρωπος τις εφυτευσεν αμπελωνα (a certain man planted a vineyard) — W Θ ƒ^{13} 565 aur c
αμπελωνα ανθρωπος εφυτευσεν (a man planted a vineyard) — א Β C Δ Ψ 33. 1424.

Mark 12:7

θεασαμενοι αυτον ερχομενον ειπαν προς εαυτους (seeing him coming, he said towards them) — Θ 565. 700. c
θεασαμενοι αυτον ερχομενον ειπον (seeing him coming, he said) — N ƒ^{13} 28.
προς εαυτους ειπαν οτι (he said towards them, "Because...) — א Β C L W Ψ 33. 892.
ειπαν προς εαυτους (he said towards them) — D
ειπον προς εαυτους οτι (he said towards them, "Because...) — A Majority of MSS

Mark 13:6

λέγοντες ὅτι Ἐγώ ο Xρηστός (saying that, "I am the Messiah") — W Θ ƒ^{13} 28 61. 115. 255. 299. 565. 700. 1071. b c g^{2} l vg^{mss} sa bo geo^{b} arm arab^{ms} Cyp
λέγοντες ὅτι Ἐγώ εἰμι (saying that, "I am he") — Majority of MSS

== See also ==
- Andreas text-type
