= Codex Washingtonianus =

Uncial 032
- New Testament manuscript
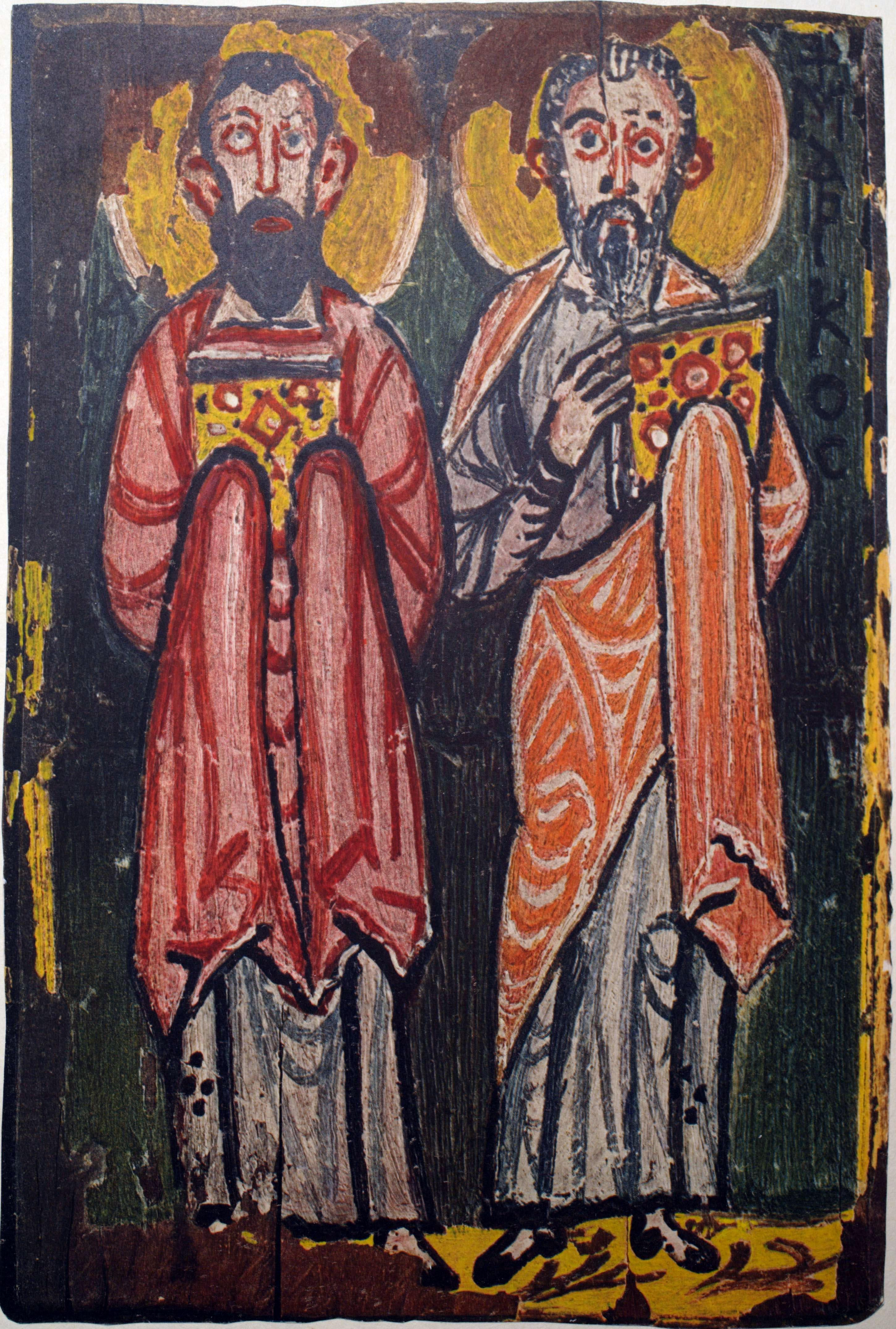
- Painted cover of the Codex Washingtonianus, depicting the evangelists Luke and Mark (7th century)
- Name: Washingtonianus (Freer Gospel)
- Sign: W
- Text: Gospels
- Date: c. 375–500
- Script: Greek
- Found: Egypt (purchased by Charles Lang Freer)
- Now at: Freer Gallery of Art
- Size: 187 leaves; 20.75 x 13.75 cm
- Type: eclectic text-type
- Category: III
- Note: unique insertion following Mark 16:14

Codex Washingtonianus, Codex Washingtonensis, Codex Freerianus, also called the Washington Manuscript of the Gospels, The Freer Gospel and The Freer Codex, is a Greek uncial manuscript of the four Gospels, written on parchment. It is designated by W or 032 in the Gregory-Aland numbering of New Testament manuscripts, and ε014 in the von Soden numbering of New Testament manuscripts. Using the study of comparative writing styles (palaeography), it has been dated to the 4th or 5th century. The manuscript has some gaps. The manuscript was among a collection of manuscripts bought by American industrialist Charles Lang Freer at the start of the 20th century, and first published by biblical scholar Henry A. Sanders.

It has been described as one of the "more important majuscule manuscripts discovered during the 20th century", and "a highly valuable manuscript." In the Gospel of Mark, it shares several distinctive readings with the early 3rd century papyrus, the Chester Beatty codex of the Gospels and Acts (𝔓^{45}). It is considered to be the third oldest Gospel parchment codex in the world.

== Description ==
The manuscript is a codex (precursor to the modern book), containing most of the text of the four Gospels written on 187 parchment leaves (sized 20.5–21 cm by 13–14.5 cm), with painted wooden covers. John 1:1–5:11 is a replacement of a presumably damaged folio, and dates to around the 7th century. Mark 15:13–38 and John 14:26–16:7 are lacking. The text is written in one column per page, 30 lines per page. The letters are written in a small, slightly sloping uncial hand, using dark-brown ink. The words are written continuously without separation. Accents (used to indicate voiced pitch changes) are absent, and the rough breathing mark (utilised to designate vowel emphasis) is written very rarely. There are numerous corrections made by the original copyist and a few corrections dating to the late 5th or 6th century. The copyist has been described as "generally a careful worker", who produced "extremely few nonsense readings" and had very few "other indicators of careless copying." As with Codex Bezae (D), the Gospels follow in the so-called "Western" order: Matthew, John, Luke, Mark.

The nomina sacra (special names/words considered sacred in Christianity, abbreviated usually with the first and last letter, and notified with an overline) are employed throughout the manuscript. The following list is of the nominative case (subject) forms utilised: Θ̅Σ̅ (θεος / God); Κ̅Σ̅ (κυριος / Lord); Χ̅Ρ̅Σ̅ (χριστος / Christ/Messiah); Ι̅Σ̅ (Ιησους / Jesus); Π̅Ν̅Α̅ (πνευμα / spirit); Α̅Ν̅Ο̅Σ̅ (ανθρωπος / man); Π̅Η̅Ρ̅ (πατηρ / father); Μ̅Η̅Ρ̅ (μητηρ / mother); Υ̅Σ̅ (υιος / son); Δ̅Α̅Δ̅, (Δαυιδ / David; Δ̅Δ̅ once); Ι̅Η̅Λ̅ (Ισραηλ / Israel; Ι̅Σ̅Ρ̅Λ̅ once).

== Text ==
The text of the codex is considered to be an admixture of different text-types. It is a "consistently cited witness of the first order" in the critical apparatus of the Nestle-Aland Novum Testamentum Graece (a critical edition of the Greek New Testament). Due to different sections of the text displaying affinities with multiple text-types, the codex has been hypothesised to have been copied from several different manuscripts, possibly pieced together from manuscripts which survived the persecution of Christians by the Emperor Diocletian. The text-types are groups of different New Testament manuscripts which share specific or generally related readings, which then differ from each other group, and thus the conflicting readings can separate out the groups. These are then used to determine the original text as published; there are three main groups with names: Alexandrian, Western, and Byzantine. The text-types of the different sections are as follows:

- Matthew 1–28; Luke 8:13–24:53 – Byzantine text-type;
- Mark 1:1–5:30 – Western text-type, similar to old-Latin Versions;
- Mark 5:31–16:20 – Supposedly Caesarean text-type, nearest to 𝔓^{45};
- Luke 1:1–8:12, and John 5:12–21:25 – Alexandrian text-type;
- John 1:1–5:11 – mixed with some Alexandrian and Western readings. This text was added in the 7th century, probably for replacement of damaged text.

The Caesarean text-type mentioned above (initially identified by biblical scholar Burnett Hillman Streeter) has been contested by several text-critics, such as Kurt and Barbara Aland. Kurt Aland placed the codex in Category III of his New Testament manuscript classification system. Category III manuscripts are described as having "a small but not a negligible proportion of early readings, with a considerable encroachment of [Byzantine] readings, and significant readings from other sources as yet unidentified."

Matthew 16:2b–3 is present and not marked as doubtful or spurious. Luke 22:43-44, John 5:4 and the Pericope de adultera are not present in the manuscript. It lacks Matthew 5:21–22 (like Minuscule 33), and Luke 19:25 (as D, 69, some lectionaries, and other manuscripts). It includes Matthew 23:14 as in most other manuscripts of the Byzantine text-type.

There is a subscription at the end of the Gospel of Mark, written in semi-cursive from the 5th century: "Holy Christ, be you with your servant Timothy and all of his." The similar note appears in Minuscule 579. Textual critic Hermann von Soden cited a number of similar subscriptions in other manuscripts.

Notable Readings

Matthew 10:12

αυτην λεγοντες ειρηνη τω οικω τουτω (...it saying, 'Peace to this house') - W א^{2} D L Θ ƒ^{1} 1010 it vg^{cl}
αυτην (...it) - Majority of manuscripts

Matthew 23:3

τηρειν τηρειται και ποιειται (to observe, observe and do) - W 0107 0138 ƒ^{13} q sy^{p, h} Majority of manuscripts
ποιήσατε καὶ τηρεῖτε - א^{2} B L Z Θ 892

Mark 1:3

πασα φαραγξ πληρωθησεται και παν ορος και βουνος ταπεινωθησεται και εσται παντα τα σκολια εις ευθειαν και η τραχεια εις πεδιον και οφθησεται η δοξα κυριου και οψεται πασα σαρξ το σωτηριον του θεου οτι κυριος ελαλησεν φωνη λεγοντος βοησον και ειπα τι βοησω οτι πασα σαρξ χορτος και πασα η δοξα αυτης ως ανθος χορτου εξηρανθη ο χορτος και το ανθος εξεπεσεν το δε ρημα κυριου μενει εις τον αιωνα (Every valley shall be filled, and every mountain and hill shall be brought low, and all the bent ways shall become straight, and the rough places plains. And the glory of Yahweh shall appear, and all flesh shall see the salvation of God, for Yahweh has spoken. The voice of one saying, "Cry", and I said, "What shall I cry? Because all flesh is grass, and all its glory as the flower of grass. The grass withers, and the flower fades, but the word of Yahweh remains forever.; addition of Isaiah 40:4–8, LXX) - W c
omit - Majority of manuscripts

Mark 2:3

ιδου ανδρες ερχονται προς αυτον βασταζοντες εν κρεβαττω παραλυτικον (Behold, men came to him carrying a paralytic on a bed) - W e bo^{pt}
ερχονται φεροντες προς αυτον παραλυτικον αιρομενον υπο τεσσαρων (they came carrying to him a paralytic, being lifted up by four men) - Majority of manuscripts

Mark 10:19

μη αποστερησης (do not defraud)

omit - W B* K Ψ ƒ^{1} ƒ^{13} 28 700 1010 1079 1242 1546 2148 ℓ 10 ℓ 950 ℓ 1642 ℓ 1761 syr^{s} arm geo
incl. - Majority of manuscripts

Mark 9:49

πας γαρ πυρι αλισθησεται (for everything shall be seasoned by fire) – W א (εν πυρι / with fire) B L Δ ƒ^{1} ƒ^{13} 28 565 700 ℓ260 sy^{s} sa
και πασα θυσια αλι αλισθησεται (and every sacrifice shall be seasoned with salt) - Majority of manuscripts

Mark 10:48

omit - W 1241
incl. - Majority of manuscripts

Mark 13:2

και μετα τριων ημερων αλλος αναστησεται ανευ χειρων (and after three days another will arise) — W D it
omit - Majority of manuscripts

Luke 4:17

καὶ ἀνοίξας τὸ βιβλίον (and opened the book) - W A B L Ξ 33 892 1195 1241 ℓ 547 sy^{s, h, pal} sa bo
καὶ ἀναπτύξας τὸ βιβλίον (and unrolled the book) - א D^{c} K Δ Θ Π Ψ ƒ^{1} ƒ^{13} 28 565 700 1009 1010 Byz

Luke 11:19

εἰ δὲ ἐγὼ ἐν Βεελζεβοὺλ ἐκβάλλω τὰ δαιμόνια (however, if I expel the demons by Beelzeboul...)

omit. - W (singular reading; words likely omitted due to homoeoteleuton, the omission due to similar looking words/letters (ὅτι λέγετε ἐν Βεελζεβοὺλ ἐκβάλλει τὰ δαιμόνια. εἰ δὲ ἐγὼ ἐν Βεελζεβοὺλ ἐκβάλλω τὰ δαιμόνια)
incl. - Majority of manuscripts

Luke 22:43–44

omit - W 𝔓^{75} א A B T 1071
incl. - Majority of manuscripts

Luke 23:34a

Ὁ δὲ Ἰησοῦς ἔλεγεν, Πάτερ, ἄφες αὐτοῖς· οὐ γὰρ οἴδασιν τί ποιοῦσιν (And Jesus said: Father forgive them, they know not what they do.)

omit - W 𝔓^{75} א^{2a} B D* Θ 0124 1241 a d sy^{s} sa bo
incl. - Majority of manuscripts

John 7:1

ου γαρ ειχεν εξουσιαν (for he does not have authority)) - W a b ff² l r^{1} sy^{c}
ου γαρ ηθελεν (for he does not want) - Majority of manuscripts

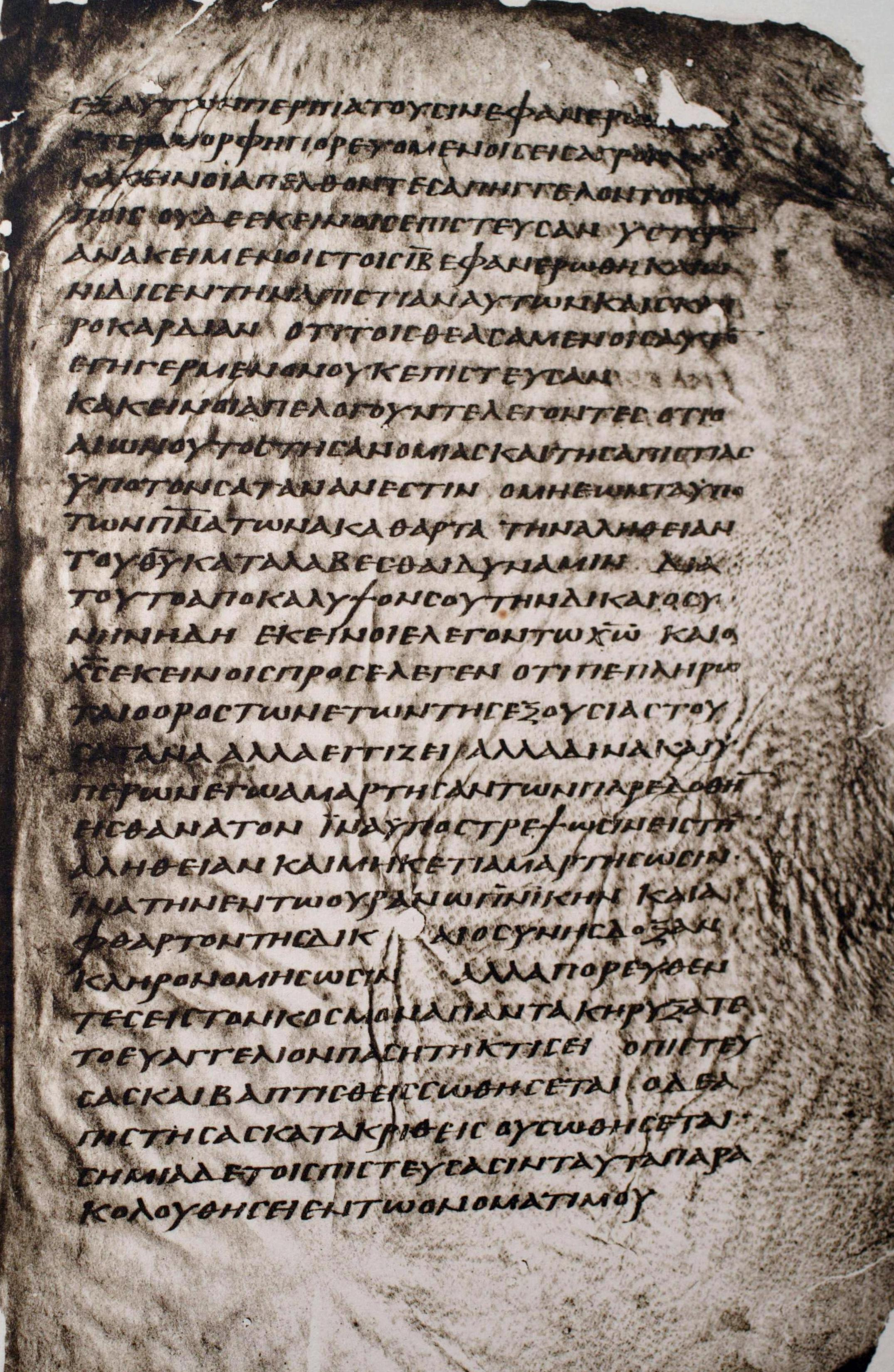
Mark 16:12-17 with the Freer Logion in 16:14

== Freer Logion ==
The ending of Mark in this codex is especially noteworthy because it includes a unique insertion after Mark 16:14, referred to as the "Freer Logion".

Κακεινοι απελογουντο λεγοντες οτι ο αιων ουτος της ανομιας και της απιστιας υπο τον σαταναν εστιν, ο μη εων τα (τον μη εωντα?) υπο των πνευματων ακαθαρτα (-των?) την αληθειαν του θεου καταλαβεσθαι (+ και?) δυναμιν. δια τουτο αποκαλυψον σου την δικαιοσυνην ηδη, εκεινοι ελεγον τω χριστω. και ο χριστος εκεινοις προσελεγεν οτι πεπληρωται ο ὅρος των ετων της εξουσιας του σατανα, ἀλλὰ εγγιζει ἄλλα δεινα. και υπερ ων εγω αμαρτησαντων παρεδοθην εις θανατον ινα υποστρεψωσιν εις την αληθειαν και μηκετι αμαρτησωσιν ινα την εν τω ουρανω πνευματικην και αφθαρτον της δικαιοσυνης δοξαν κληρονομησωσιν.

Translation:

And they excused themselves, saying, "This age of lawlessness and unbelief is under Satan, who does not allow the truth and power of God to prevail over the unclean things of the spirits [or: does not allow what lies under the unclean spirits to understand the truth and power of God]. Therefore reveal thy righteousness now" - thus they spoke to Christ. And Christ replied to them, "The term of years of Satan's power has been fulfilled, but other terrible things draw near. And for those who have sinned I was delivered over to death, that they may return to the truth and sin no more in order to inherit the spiritual and incorruptible glory of righteousness which is in heaven.

This text is not found in any other manuscript, but was partially quoted by Jerome in contra Pelagianos 2.15:

et illi satisfaciebant dicentes: Saeculum istud iniquitatis et incredulitatis substantia (sub Satana?) est, quae non sinit per immundos spiritus veram Dei apprehendi virtutem: idcirco iamnunc revela iustitiam tuam. (and they excused themselves, saying: This century is the essence of iniquity and unbelief, which does not allow the true power of God to be apprehended by unclean spirits: therefore, reveal your righteousness now.)

== History ==
During a trip to Egypt in December 1906, Charles Lang Freer bought the manuscript from an antiques dealer in Cairo, along with three other manuscripts. Biblical scholar Bruce M. Metzger states: "It is the only Greek Gospel manuscript of early date of which we know provenance. Though the exact spot in Egypt where it was found is not known, there are indications that it came from a monastery in the neighbourhood of the Pyramids." The writing style is closely related to the Codex Panopolitanus (Cairo Papyrus 10759), a manuscript containing portions of the first book of Enoch, found in Akhmim in 1886. The initial discovery of the manuscript prompted numerous scholarly articles and studies, however only irregular attention has been paid to the manuscript in the latter half of the 20th century, to which biblical scholar Larry Hurtado could decry in 2006, "the general public today scarcely knows of [it]." Though all the manuscripts bought by Freer were considered significant, and gave America "an important standing in respect of Biblical manuscripts," the manuscript of the Gospels was deemed "by far the most important".

Details of Freer's acquisition and importance of the manuscript was announced by biblical scholar Henry Sanders at the general meeting of the Archaeological Institute and the American Philological Association, held in December 1907. He then went onto publish an initial article on it and the other manuscripts entitled New Manuscripts of the Bible from Egypt, in the 12th volume of the American Journal of Archaeology, Issue 1. Within the article he provided photographs of some of the other manuscripts, and from the Freer Gospels codex a page from the Gospel of Mark, and the two painted covers. He also published the first transcription of a new ending to the Gospel of Mark, later to be named "the Freer Logion."

The manuscript was published in a full critical edition and separate facsimile volume by Sanders in 1912, of which Freer had to use his personal expenses to fund its publication, costing a total of $16,233.77 ($3,204.02 for the 994 copies of the critical edition; $13,029.75 for the 435 copies of the facsimile), or $496,714.87 in today's money.

The codex is currently located in the Smithsonian Institution at the Freer Gallery of Art (06. 274) in Washington, D.C., United States. Complete image replicas of the codex are available from the Rights and Reproductions office at the Freer Gallery of Art. The manuscript is currently dated by the INTF to the 4th or 5th century.

== See also ==
- Codex Monacensis (X / 033)
- Codex Mosquensis II (V / 031)
- List of New Testament uncials
- Biblical Manuscripts in the Freer Collection
- Textual criticism
