= Minuscule 1071 =

- New Testament manuscript
- Text: Gospels
- Date: 12th century
- Script: Greek
- Now at: Mount Athos
- Cite: Bruce M. Metzger, Bart D. Ehrman, The Text of the New Testament: Its Transmission, Corruption and Restoration, (Oxford University Press, 2005), p. 90.
- Type: Caesarean text-type

Minuscule 1071 is a Greek minuscule manuscript of the four Gospels, written on parchment. It is designated as 1071 in the Gregory-Aland numbering of New Testament manuscripts, and as ε1279 in the von Soden numbering of New Testament manuscripts. Using the study of comparative writing styles (palaeography), it is dated to the 12th century. Biblical scholar Kirsopp Lake described it as having "great features of interest." It is one of the many manuscripts from the monasteries on Mount Athos microfilmed for the Library of Congress and the International Greek New Testament project between 1952 and 1953.

== Description ==
The manuscript is a codex (precursor to the modern book), containing the text of the four Gospels written on 181 parchment leaves (size 28,5 x 21,5 cm). The text was written in two columns, with 26-28 lines a page. It was written by two or three copyists, somewhere either in Italy or Sicily. The codex contains the letter to Carpius, Eusebian canons, tables of contents (known as κεφαλαια / kephalaia) before each gospel, pictures of the Evangelists before each gospel, the chapter titles (known as τιτλοι / titloi) written at the top of the pages, the Synaxerion, the menologion, and at the end of each gospel the list of lines (known as στιχοι / stichoi) are noted. According to Lake, the spelling of words in the manuscript is "very bad".

After the gospels of Matthew and Mark there are contained two colophon's, the first of which after Matthew is known as the "Jerusalem colophon", which states that the manuscript was copied and corrected "from the ancient manuscripts in Jerusalem." The subscriptions to Luke and John are absent.

Subscriptions to the Gospels
Gospel	Greek	English
Matthew	ἐυαγγέλιον κατα Ματθαῖον ἐγράφη καἰ ἀντεβλήθη ἐκ τῶν ἐν Ἱεροσολυμοις παλαιῶν ἀντιγράφων τῶν ἐν τῷ ἁγιῳ ὄρει ἀποκειμενων. στχ. ,Β̅Φ̅	Gospel according to Matthew. Copied and corrected from the ancient manuscripts in Jerusalem preserved on the Holy Mountain. 2500 lines.
Mark	ἐυαγγέλιον κατὰ Μάρκον. ἐγράφη καἰ ἀντεβλήθη ὁμοίως ἐκ τῶν ἐσπουδασμένων. στχ. ,Α̅Φ̅ς̅.	Gospel according to Mark. Copied and corrected likewise from the best ones. 1590 lines.

These colophon's are seen in several other manuscripts: Λ (039), 20, 117, 153, 157, 164, 215, 262, 300, 376, 428, 565, 566, 686, 718, 728, 748, 829, 899, 901, 922, 980, 1032, 1071, 1118, 1121, 1124, 1187, 1198, 1355, 1422, 1521, 1545, 1555, 1682, 2145, and 2245.

== Text ==
Biblical scholar Burnett H. Streeter classified its text as a tertiary witness to the Caesarean type. The text-types are groups of different New Testament manuscripts which share specific or generally related readings, which then differ from each other group, and thus the conflicting readings can separate out the groups. These are then used to determine the original text as published; there are three main groups with names: Alexandrian, Western, and Byzantine. The Caesarean text-type however has been contested by several text-critics, such as Kurt and Barbara Aland. Aland placed it in Category III of his New Testament manuscript text classification system. Category III manuscripts are described as having "a small but not a negligible proportion of early readings, with a considerable encroachment of [Byzantine] readings, and significant readings from other sources as yet unidentified." Among Aland's test collation passages (a specific list of verses in the New Testament which have been determined to show to which text-type a manuscript belongs), the codex has 180 variants in agreement with the Byzantine text, 90 with the Byzantine and Nestle-Aland texts, 21 with the Nestle-Aland text, and 33 distinctive readings.

According to the Claremont Profile Method it represents the Alexandrian text-type as a core member. The text of Luke 22:43-44 is not included in the main text, two verses which are also missing in several other manuscripts, however they have been written in the margin.

Lake noted that several readings in the Jesus and the woman caught in adultery story (John 7:53-8:11) had "remarkable similarity" to readings in Codex Bezae, with eight variants which are only shared between the two manuscripts. Especially the reading ἐπὶ ἀμαρτίᾳ (in sin) as opposed to επι μοιχεὶᾳ (in adultery) in 8:3, a reading which was read by the early church father Papias in the uncanonical gospel "the gospel to the Hebrews", as quoted by early church father Eusebius. Lake postulated that it was possible both Bezae and 1071 were in the same location at some point in south Italy, and the copyist of 1071 used Codex Bezae as an exemplar to copy from when copying John 7:53-8:11. However, due to no major similarities between the two in the rest of minuscule 1071, Lake surmised that if it was codex Bezae which was used, it wasn't using for any other section..

== History ==
The early history of the manuscript is unknown. During 1952–1953, the manuscript was one of those microfilmed by a team led by Earnest W. Saunders of the Garrett Biblical Institute over a period of six months for the Library of Congress and the International Greek New Testament project. The team visited the Great Lavra Monastery on April 3, 1953, where they microfilmed 79 manuscripts contained in the monastery library over a period of 28 days. It is currently housed in the Great Lavra Monastery on Mount Athos (shelf number A' 104). It is currently dated to the 12th century CE.

== See also ==
- List of New Testament minuscules
- Textual criticism
- Biblical manuscript
