= Minuscule 406 =

- New Testament manuscript
- Text: Gospels †
- Date: 11th century
- Script: Greek
- Now at: Biblioteca Marciana
- Size: 16.5 cm by 13.5 cm
- Type: Caesarean text-type
- Category: none
- Note: marginalia

Minuscule 406 (in the Gregory-Aland numbering), ε 130 (in Soden's numbering), is a Greek minuscule manuscript of the New Testament, on parchment. Palaeographically it has been assigned to the 11th century. It contains marginalia.

== Description ==
The codex contains the text of the four Gospels on 297 parchment leaves (16.5 cm by 13.5 cm) with some lacunae (Mark 4:41-5:14; Luke 3:16-4:4; John 20:3-21:25). The text is written in one column per page, in 18 lines per page.

The text is divided according to numbers of the κεφαλαια (chapters) at the margin, the τιτλοι (titles) at the top of the pages. There is also a division according to the smaller Ammonian Sections, but it does not contain references to the Eusebian Canons.

It contains tables of the κεφαλαια (tables of contents) before each Gospel. Lectionary markings were added at the margin by a later hand.

== Text ==
The Greek text of the codex is a representative of the Caesarean text-type. Hermann von Soden classified it to the Ι^{α}. Kurt Aland the Greek text of the codex did not place in any Category.

According to the Claremont Profile Method it represents textual family K^{x} in Luke 1 and Luke 20. In Luke 10 no profile was made.

== History ==
Wiedmann and J. G. J. Braun collated portions of the manuscript for Scholz (1794-1852). The manuscript was added to the list of New Testament manuscripts by Scholz. C. R. Gregory saw it in 1886.

The manuscript is currently housed at the Biblioteca Marciana (Gr. I. 11) in Venice.

== See also ==
- List of New Testament minuscules
- Biblical manuscript
- Textual criticism
