= Uncial 0188 =

- New Testament manuscript
- Text: Mark 11:11-17
- Date: 4th century
- Script: Greek
- Now at: Berlin State Museums
- Size: 13 x 11 cm
- Type: Caesarean text-type
- Category: III

Uncial 0188 (in the Gregory-Aland numbering), is a Greek uncial manuscript of the New Testament, dated paleographically to the 4th century.

== Description ==
The codex contains a small parts of the Gospel of Mark 11:11-17, on one parchment leaf (13 cm by 11 cm). It is written in two columns per page, 21 lines per page, in uncial letters.

The Greek text of this codex is a representative of the Caesarean text-type, but with many singular readings. Aland placed it in Category III.

Currently it is dated by the INTF to the 4th century.

The codex currently is housed at the Berlin State Museums (P. 13416) in Berlin.

== See also ==
- List of New Testament uncials
- Textual criticism
