= Lectionary 32 =

11th century Greek New Testament manuscript

Lectionary ℓ 32
- New Testament manuscript
- Name: Cod. Gothanus
- Text: Evangelistarion
- Date: 11th-century
- Script: Greek
- Now at: Gotha
- Size: 34.5 cm by 25 cm
- Type: Caesarean text-type
- Hand: carelessly written

Lectionary 32, designated by siglum ℓ 32 (in the Gregory-Aland numbering). It is a Greek manuscript of the New Testament, on parchment leaves. Palaeographically it has been assigned to the 11th-century.

== Description ==
The codex contains lessons from the Gospels of John, Matthew, Luke lectionary (Evangelistarium). It is written in Greek minuscule letters, on 273 parchment leaves (34.5 cm by 25 cm), in 2 columns per page, 20 lines per page. Carelessly written.

The Greek text of the codex is a representative of the Caesarean text-type.

Text of the codex was edited by Matthaei in 1791. C. R. Gregory saw it in 1889.

The manuscript is cited in the critical editions of the Greek New Testament (UBS3).

Currently the codex is located in the Landesbibliothek (Memb. I 78) in Gotha.

== See also ==
- List of New Testament lectionaries
- Biblical manuscript
- Textual criticism

== Bibliography ==
- Gregory, Caspar René (1900). Textkritik des Neuen Testaments. Vol. 1. Leipzig: J.C. Hinrichs. p. 390.
