= Lectionary 260 =

Lectionary ℓ 260
- New Testament manuscript
- Text: Evangelistarium
- Date: ? century
- Script: Greek
- Now at: Jassy?
- Size: 28.5 cm by 21.5 cm

Lectionary 260, designated by siglum ℓ 260 (in the Gregory-Aland numbering) is a Greek manuscript of the New Testament, on parchment. Palaeographically it has been not assigned to any century. Scrivener labelled it as 198^{e}, Gregory by 83^{a}. The manuscript has been lost.

== Description ==
The codex contains lessons from the Gospels lectionary (Evangelistarium).

In Mark 9:49 it reads πας γαρ πυρι αλισθησεται – as manuscripts (א εν πυρι) B L W Δ f^{1} f^{13} 28 565 700 syr^{s} cop^{sa}.

The age of the codex is still unknown. It was never assigned on the palaeography ground.

== History ==
Eduard de Muralt received the collation of the codex from Odessa.

The manuscript was added to the list of New Testament manuscripts by Scrivener (number 198^{e}) and Gregory (number 260^{e}). Gregory did not see the manuscript.

The manuscript is sporadically cited in the critical editions of the Greek New Testament (UBS3).

Formerly the codex was housed at the State Archaeological Museum in Odessa. The present place of its housing is unknown (Jassy?). The owner of the codex is unknown.

== See also ==
- List of New Testament lectionaries
- Biblical manuscript
- Textual criticism
- Lectionary 259

== Bibliography ==
- Gregory, Caspar René (1900). Textkritik des Neuen Testaments. Vol. 1. Leipzig: Hinrichs. p. 409.
