= Lectionary 10 =

Lectionary ℓ 10
- New Testament manuscript
- Text: Gospels
- Date: 13th-century
- Script: Greek
- Now at: Bibliothèque nationale de France
- Size: 32.2 cm by 24.5 cm

Lectionary 10, designated by siglum ℓ 10 (in the Gregory-Aland numbering). It is a Greek manuscript of the New Testament, on vellum leaves. Palaeographically it has been assigned to the 13th-century. The manuscript is lacunose.

== Description ==
The codex contains lessons from the Gospel of Matthew and Gospel of Luke (Evangelistarium). Lessons from the Gospel of John were lost. The text is written in Greek minuscule letters, on 142 parchment leaves (32.2 cm by 24.5 cm), 2 columns per page, 23 lines per page.

In Mark 10:19 — phrase μη αποστερησης is omitted, as in codices B (added by second corrector), K, W, Ψ, f^{1}, f^{13}, 28, 700, 1010, 1079, 1242, 1546, 2148, ℓ 950, ℓ 1642, ℓ 1761, syr^{s}, arm, geo. This omission is typical for the Caesarean text-type.

It is one of the very few lectionaries (also ℓ 211, ℓ 1642, ℓ 1761) with verse Mark 15:28.

== History ==
F. H. A. Scrivener dated it to the 11th-century. Currently it is dated by the INTF to the 13th century.

The manuscript was examined by Wettstein, Scholz, and Paulin Martin. It was added to the list of the New Testament manuscripts by Wettstein. C. R. Gregory saw the manuscript in 1885.

The manuscript is cited in the critical editions of the Greek New Testament of UBS (UBS3).

The codex now is located in the Bibliothèque nationale de France (Gr. 287).

== See also ==
- List of New Testament lectionaries
- Biblical manuscript
- Textual criticism

== Bibliography ==
- Gregory, Caspar René (1900). Textkritik des Neuen Testaments. Vol. 1. Leipzig: J. C. Hinrichs. p. 388.
