= Minuscule 33 =

- New Testament manuscript
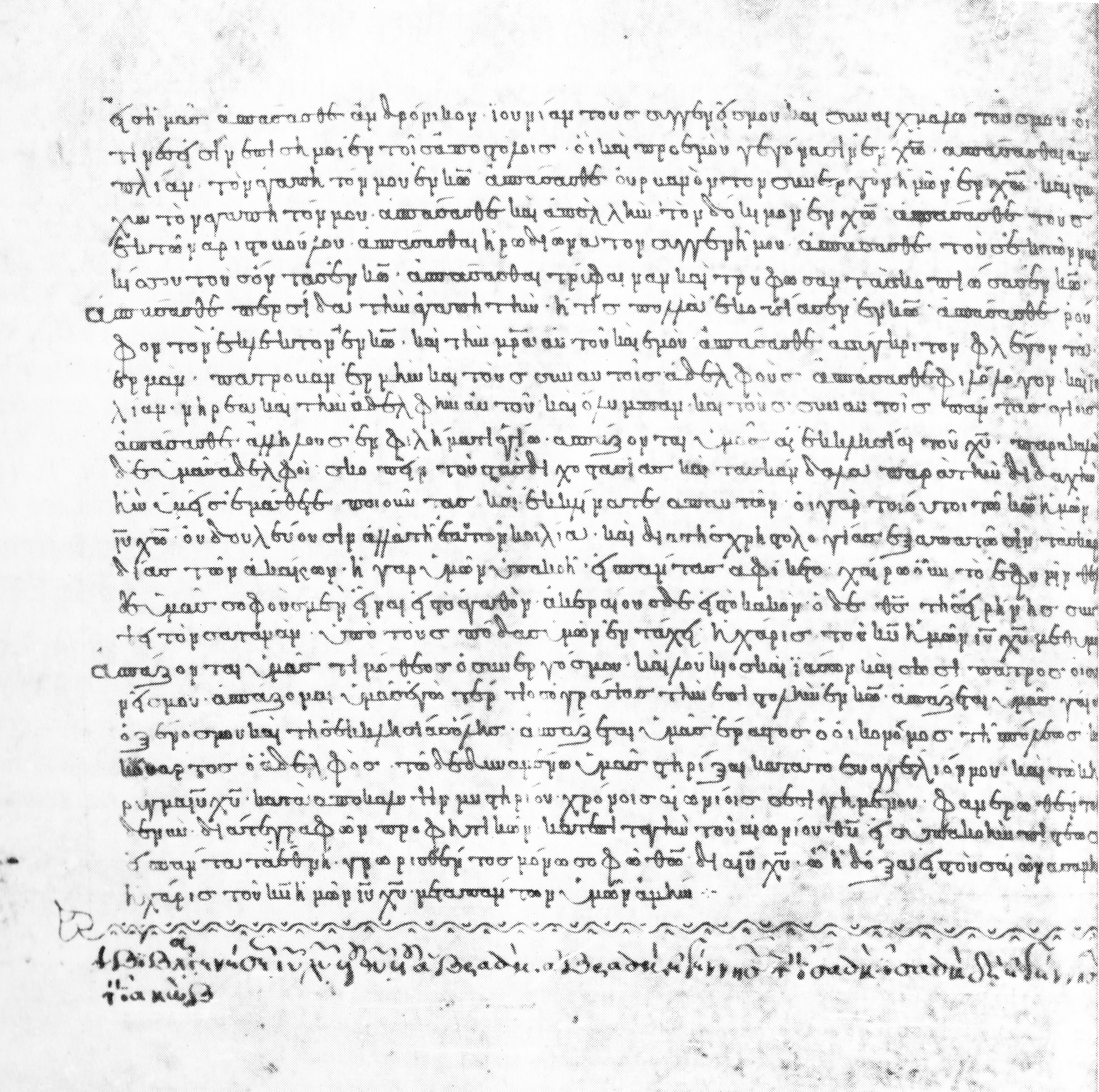
- Folio 100 verso
- Text: New Testament (except Rev)
- Date: 9th century
- Script: Greek
- Now at: National Library of France
- Size: 37.5 cm by 24.8 cm
- Type: Alexandrian text-type
- Category: I/II
- Note: Matthew 21:44 omitted marginalia

Minuscule 33 is a Greek minuscule manuscript of the New Testament, written on parchment. Before the French Revolution was called Codex Colbertinus 2844. It is designated by the siglum 33 in the Gregory-Aland numbering of New Testament manuscripts, and as δ 48 in the von Soden numbering of New Testament manuscripts. Using the study of comparative handwriting styles (palaeography), it has been assigned to the 9th century. The manuscript has several gaps.

It has marginal notes. According to textual critics, it is one of the best minuscule manuscripts of the New Testament.

== Description ==
The manuscript is a codex (precursor to the modern book format), containing part of the Prophets of the Old Testament, and all the books of the New Testament except the Revelation of John, written on 143 parchment leaves (sized 37.5 cm by 24.8 cm) in minuscule letters, with three missing portions in the Gospel of Mark (Mark 9:31-11:11; 13:11-14:60), and Gospel of Luke (Luke 21:38-23:26). The text is written in 1 column per page, 48-52 lines per page.

The text is divided according to the chapters (known as κεφαλαια / kephalaia), whose numerals are given in the margin, and their titles (known as τίτλοι / titloi) written at the top of the pages. It contains Prolegomena (introductions) to the Catholic epistles and the Pauline epistles (folios 73-76), and the Euthalian Apparatus (several additional materials to the Epistles such as summaries, lists, text divisions etc.).

Part of almost every leaf has been destroyed by dampness. The leaves were joined so firmly to each other — especially in the Book of Acts — that when separated, a part of the ink has adhered to the opposite page. Text is replete with errors of iotacism. The ends of the leaves are damaged.

Order of books

- Gospels
- Acts
- Catholic epistles
- Pauline epistles (Hebrews placed before 1 Timothy).

The ending of the Epistle to the Romans has the following order of verses: 16:23, 16:25-27, 16:24. This order is also seen in codices Codex Porphyrianus (P), minuscules 104. 256. 263. 365. 436. 459. 1319. 1573., and 1852., and some armenian manuscripts.

== Text ==
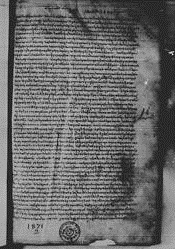

Its Greek text is considered to be a representative of the Alexandrian text-type, but with some Byzantine readings, particularly in Acts of the Apostles and the Pauline epistles. Biblical scholar Kurt Aland placed it in Category II in the Gospels, and to Category I in the rest of books of the New Testament. According to the Claremont Profile Method (a specific analysis of textual data), it represents the Alexandrian text-type as its weak member.

Notable readings

Matthew 8:13

και υποστρεψας ο εκατονταρχος εις τον οικον αυτου εν αυτη τη ωρα ευρεν τον παιδα υγιαινοντα (and when the centurion returned to the house in that hour, he found the slave well) - 33 א C (N) Θ (0250) f^{1} 1241 g^{1} sy^{h}
omit - Majority of manuscripts.

Matthew 16:12

της ζυμης των Φαρισαιων (the leaven of the Pharisees) - 33
της ζυμης των αρτων (the leaven of the breads) - א^{c2} B L 157. 892.
της ζυμης του αρτου (the leaven of the bread) - C L W X 13 700. Majority; Chrys.

Matthew 21:44

omit - 33 𝔓^{104} D b d e ff^{1} ff^{2} r^{1} sy^{s} diatess.
incl. - Majority of manuscripts.

Matthew 27:9

επληρωθη το ρηθεν δια του προφητου (fulfilled what was spoken by the prophet) - 33 Φ a b sy^{s, p} bo
επληρωθη το ρηθεν δια Ιερεμιου του προφητου (fulfilled what was spoken by Jeremiah the prophet) - Majority of manuscripts.

Luke 4:17

καὶ ἀνοίξας τὸ βιβλίον (and opened the book) - 33 A B L W Ξ 892. 1195. 1241. ℓ 547 sy^{s, h, pal} sa bo
καὶ ἀναπτύξας τὸ βιβλίον (and unrolled the book) - א D^{c} K Δ Θ Π Ψ ƒ^{1} ƒ^{13} 28 565 700 1009. 1010.

Acts 20:28

του κυριου (of the Lord) - 33 𝔓^{74} C* D E Ψ 36 453 945 1739 1891
του Θεου (of the God) - א B 614. 1175. 1505. vg sy bo^{mt}; Cyprian
του κυριου και του Θεου (of the Lord and God) - Majority of manuscripts. (Note: For more details about textual variants of this verse see: Textual variants in the Acts of the Apostles.)

Acts 28:29

omit - 33 𝔓^{74} א A B Codex Laudianus Ψ Codex Vaticanus 2061 81. 1175. 1739. 2464.
incl. - Majority of manuscripts.

1 Corinthians 3:4

ουκ ανθρωποι (not to men) - 33 𝔓^{46} א A B C 048 81. 1175. 1506. 1739. 1881.
ουχι σαρκικοι (not to flesh) - א^{2} Ψ Majority of manuscripts.

1 Corinthians 7:5

τη προσευχη (prayer) - 33 𝔓^{11}𝔓^{46} א* A B C D F G P Ψ 6. 81. 104. 181. 629. 630. 1739. 1877. 1881. 1962. it vg sa bo arm eth.
τη νηστεια και τη προσευχη (fasting and prayer) - Majority of manuscripts.

2 Timothy 1:11

καὶ διάκονος (and servant) - 33 pc
καὶ διδάσκαλος ἐθνῶν (and teacher of nations) - Majority of Manuscripts.

== History ==
The earliest history of the manuscript is unknown. It was called "the queen of the cursives" by J. G. Eichhorn (1752-1827), but now it has several rivals (81, 892, 1175, 1739). The manuscript was examined by many scholars, such as Griesbach, who collated its text in Matthew 1-18. It was also studied by Birch and others. The text of the codex was fully collated by S. P. Tregelles in 1850. Tregelles said that, of all the manuscripts he collated (presumably excluding palimpsests), it was the hardest to read.

It was examined and described by Paulin Martin. C. R. Gregory saw the manuscript twice, in 1884 and in 1885. The manuscript was included to a critical apparatus by Kurt Aland in his 25th edition of Novum Testamentum Graece (1963).

Scholz and Martin dated the manuscript to the 11th century. Gregory dated it to the 9th or 10th century. Currently it is dated by the INTF to the 9th century. The codex is now located in the National Library of France (shelf number Cod. Gr. 14) at Paris.

== See also ==
- Minuscule 34
- Minuscule 32
- List of New Testament minuscules
- Biblical manuscript
- Textual criticism
