= Codex Bezae =

Handwritten copy of the New Testament in Greek and Latin

Uncial 05
- New Testament manuscript
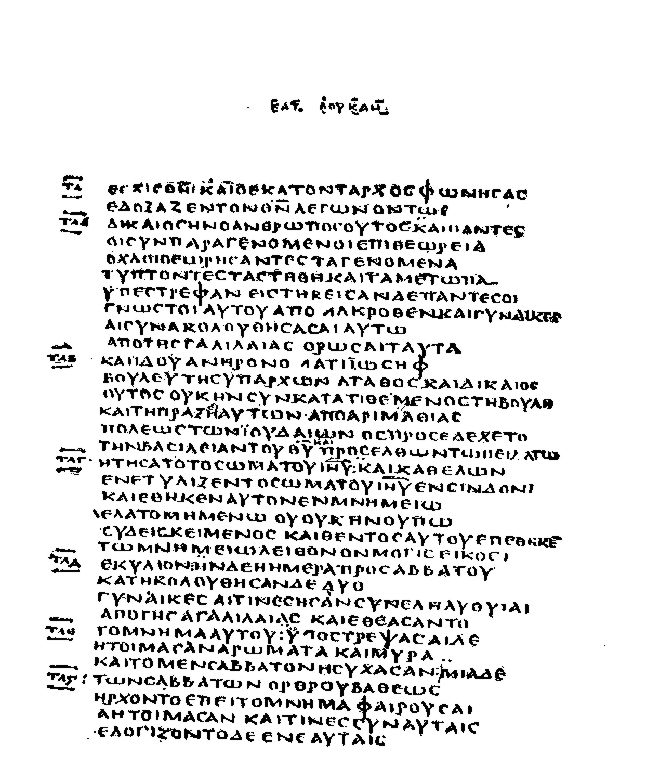
- A sample of the Greek text from the Codex Bezae
- Name: Bezae
- Sign: D^{ea}
- Text: Gospels and Acts of Apostles
- Date: c. ~400
- Script: Greek-Latin diglot
- Now at: University of Cambridge
- Size: 26 × 21.5 cm (10.2 × 8.5 in)
- Type: Western text-type
- Category: IV

The Codex Bezae Cantabrigiensis ('Beza's Cambridge Book') is a bi-lingual Greek and Latin manuscript of the New Testament written in an uncial hand on parchment. It is designated by the siglum D^{ea} or 05 in the Gregory-Aland numbering of New Testament manuscripts, and δ 5 in the von Soden numbering of New Testament manuscripts. It contains most of the four Gospels and Acts, with a small fragment of 3 John. Using the study of comparative writing styles (palaeography), it is currently dated to the 5th century.

Codex Bezae is renowned for having a distinctive text of the four Gospels and Acts, and is a leading member of the "Western" recension. The manuscript has been studied extensively.

A digital facsimile of the codex is available from Cambridge University Library, which holds the manuscript.

== Description ==
The manuscript is a codex (the precursor to the modern book), containing the text of the four Gospels, Acts and 3 John written on 406 extant parchment leaves, from perhaps an original 534 (sized 26 x 21.5 cm). The text is written in one column per page, with the Greek text on the left face and the Latin text on the right. The text is written colometrically and is full of hiatus. The first three lines of each book are in red letters, with black and red ink alternating the title of books. As many as eleven correctors (designated as G, A, C, B, D, E, H, F, J^{1}, L, K) have amended the text of the manuscript between the sixth and twelfth centuries. The Greek text of the codex has some copying errors, e.g., errors of metathesis (the transposition of sounds or syllables in a word), such as seen in John 1:3, where εγενετο (egeneto) was changed into ενεγετο (enegeto); and in Acts 1:9, where υπελαβεν (hypelaben) transforms into υπεβαλεν (hypebalen).

The manuscript employs the following nomina sacra (sacred names/words considered sacred in Christianity); the ones cited here are only nominative case (subject case) examples: Ι̅Η̅Σ̅ (Ιησους / Iēsous / Jesus), Χ̅Ρ̅Σ̅ (Χριστος / Christos / Christ), Π̅Α̅Ρ̅ (πατηρ / patēr / Father), Σ̅Τ̅Η̅ (σταυρωθη / staurōthē / [he] was crucified). Other words which usually feature among the nomina sacra are written out in full: μητερ (mēter / Mother), υιος (huios / Son), σωτηρ (sōter / savior), ανθρωπος (anthrōpos / man), ουρανος (ouranos / sky), Δαυιδ (David), Ισραηλ (Israel), and Ιερουσαλημ (Iērousalēm 'Jerusalem').

== Codex contents ==
The manuscript presents the gospels in the so-called Western order of Matthew, John, Luke and Mark, of which only Luke is complete; after some missing pages the manuscript picks up with the Third Epistle of John (in Latin) and contains part of Acts.

Missing sections
Matthew 1:1–20, 6:20–9:2, 27:2–12; John 1:16–3:26; Acts 8:29–10:14, 21:2–10, 21:16–18, 22:10–20, 22:29–end

Omitted verses
Matthew 5:20; 5:30; 9:34; 10:37b; 10:41b; 21:44; 23:14
Mark 15:28
Luke 5:39; Luke 11:32; Luke 11:36; 12:21; 19:25; 23:34; 24:5; 24:12; 24:40
John 5:4

Supplementations (by a later hand)
Matthew 3:7–16; Mark 16:15–20; John 18:14–20:13

== Text type ==
The Greek text is unique, with many interpolations found in no other manuscript. It has several remarkable omissions, and a capricious tendency to rephrase sentences. Aside from this one Greek manuscript, the type of text is found in Old Latin (pre-Vulgate) versions — as seen in the Latin here — and in Syriac, and Armenian versions. Bezae is the principal Greek representative of the Western text-type.

There is no consensus on the many problems the Greek text presents. Since the Latin text occasionally agrees with Codices Bobiensis and Vercellensis against all others, it "preserves an ancient form of the Old Latin", and is a witness to a text which was current no later than 250 CE. Issues of conformity have dogged the usage of the codex in biblical scholarship. "In general the Greek text is treated as an unreliable witness," but it is "an important corroborating witness wherever it agrees with other early manuscripts."

Some of the outstanding features: Matthew 16:2b–3 is present and not marked as doubtful or spurious. One of the longer endings of Mark is given. Luke 22:43f and the Pericope Adulterae are present and not marked as spurious or doubtful. John 5:4 is omitted, and the text of Acts is nearly 8% longer than the generally received text. It also includes a story of a man working on the Sabbath placed after Luke 6:4 which is not found in any other manuscript.

Acts in Codex Bezae differs quite considerably from other manuscripts, which some argue possibly represents an earlier version directly from Luke.

== Notable readings ==
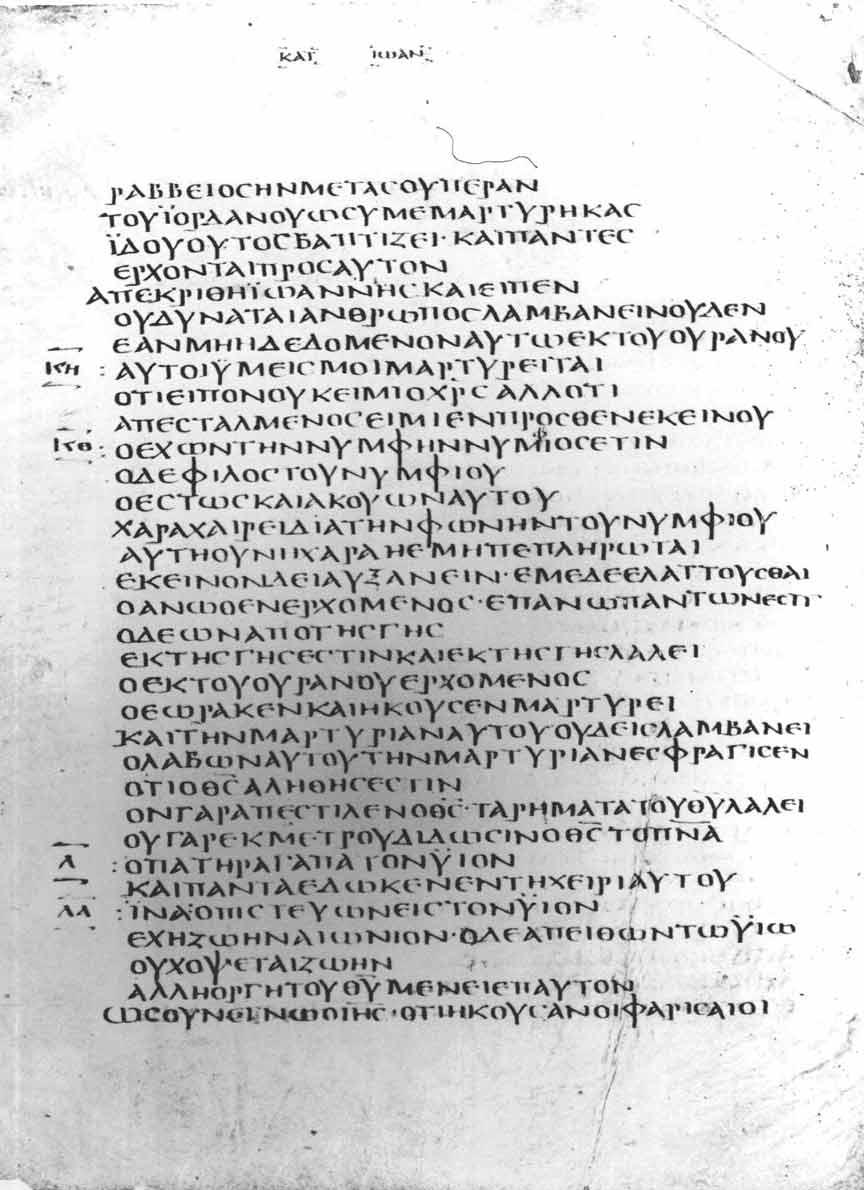
John 3:26–4:1 (Greek text)

Codex Bezae Cantabrigiensis contains some extraordinary readings. Below is a selection of some of the more notable or unsupported readings, with text and translation.

Gospel of Matthew
Matthew 1:22

διὰ Ησαιου τοῦ προφήτου (through Isaiah the prophet) : D it^{mss} vg^{mss} syr^{s,(c),h,pal} sa^{ms} arm Diatessaron^{syr} Irenaeus^{lat}
διὰ τοῦ προφήτου (through the prophet) : Majority Byz

Matthew 2:17

ὑπὸ κυριου διὰ Ἰερεμίου (by the LORD through Jeremiah) : D it^{aur}
διὰ Ἰερεμίου (through Jeremiah) : א B C al
ὑπὸ Ἰερεμίου (by Jeremiah) : Majority Byz

Matthew 3:16

καταβαίνοντα ἐκ τοῦ οὐρανοῦ ὡς περιστερὰν (descending out of heaven like a dove) : D it vg^{mss} syr^{h}
καταβαῖνον ὡσεὶ περιστερὰν (descending like a dove) : Majority Byz

Matthew 4:4

ἐκπορευομένῳ διὰ στόματος (proceeds out through the mouth)

Omit. : D it^{a, b, g^{1}}
Incl. : Majority Byz

Matthew 5:4–5

Matt 5:5, 4: D 17. 33. 130. lat syr^{c} Clement Origen Eusebius
Matt 5:4,5 : Majority Byz

Matthew 5:11

ψευδόμενοι (falsely)

Omit. : D b c d g^{1} h k syr^{s} Tertullian Augustine
Incl. : Majority Byz

ἕνεκεν δικαιοσύνης (for the sake of righteousness) : D it^{mss}
ἕνεκεν ἐμοῦ (for my sake) : Majority Byz

Matthew 5:19

ὃς δʼ ἂν ποιήσῃ καὶ διδάξῃ, οὗτος μέγας κληθήσεται ἐν τῇ βασιλείᾳ τῶν οὐρανῶν (but whoever will do [them] and should teach [them], the same will be called great in the kingdom of the heavens)

Omit. : D א* W bo^{ms}
Incl. : Majority Byz

Matthew 5:32

καὶ ὃς ἐὰν ἀπολελυμένην γαμήσῃ, μοιχᾶται (and whoever should marry her who is divorced, he commits adultery)

Omit. : D it^{a,b,d,k} Origen^{mss}
Incl. : Majority Byz

ὑπὲρ τῶν επηρεαζοντων υμας, καὶ διωκόντων ὑμᾶς : D L W Δ Θ 047 ƒ^{13} 33. 118. 700. 892. Byz lat syr^{p, h,pal} mae-1 goth Clement Eusebius
ὑπὲρ τῶν διωκόντων ὑμᾶς : א B ƒ^{1} 22 279 660* 1192 2786* it^{k} syr^{s, c} sa bo Irenaeus^{lat} Origen Cyprian

Matthew 6:6

πρόσευξαι τῷ πατρί σου ἐν τῷ κρυπτῷ (shut the door and pray to your Father in secret) : D ƒ^{1} ƒ^{13} 700. syr^{s,c} bo^{mss}
πρόσευξαι τῷ πατρί σου τῷ ἐν τῷ κρυπτῷ (shut the door and pray to your Father who is in secret) : Majority Byz

Matthew 6:8

ἀνοῖξαι τὸ στόμα (open your mouth) : D it^{h}
αἰτῆσαι αὐτόν (ask him) : Majority Byz

Matthew 10:3

Λεββαῖος (Lebbaeus) : D it^{k,μ} Origen^{lat}
Θαδδαῖος (Thaddeus) : א B 124 788. 892. 2211. f^{13^{mss}} 17. 130. 892. it^{aur,c,ff^{1}l} vg sa bo
Λεββαῖος ὁ ἐπικληθεὶς Θαδδαῖος (Lebbaeus, called Thaddeus) : C^{2} L W X Δ Θ ƒ^{1} ƒ^{13^{mss}} 22. 33. 565. 579. 700. Byz it^{f} syr^{p, h,pal} arm
Judas Zelotes (Judas the Zealot) : it^{a,b,g^{1},h, q}
omit. : syr^{s}

Matthew 10:14

τῆς οἰκίας ἢ (that house or)

Omit. : D arm
Incl. : Majority Byz

Matthew 10:18

ἐπὶ ἡγεμόνων σταθήσεσθε (you shall be caused to stand before governors)

Incl. : D 0171 it^{mss} syr^{s}
Omit. : Majority Byz

Matthew 10:19

δοθήσεται γὰρ ὑμῖν ἐν ἐκείνῃ τῇ ὥρᾳ τί λαλήσητε (for it will be given to you in that hour what you should speak)

Omit. : D L it^{mss} vg^{mss} Epiphanius
Incl. : Majority Byz

Matthew 11:3

ἐργαζόμενος (Are you the one who is to labor) : D*
ἐρχόμενος (Are you the one who is to come) : Majority Byz

Matthew 11:5

καὶ χωλοὶ περιπατοῦσιν (and the lame are walking)

Omit. : D
Incl. : Majority Byz

Matthew 12:34

λαλεῖ ἀγαθὰ (speaks good) : D* it^{d}
λαλεῖ (speaks) : Majority Byz

Matthew 13:14

Πορεύθητι, καὶ εἰπὲ τῷ λαῷ τούτῳ (Go, and tell the people this)

Incl. : D it^{mss} mae-1 Eusebius
Omit. : Majority Byz

Matthew 13:33

ἐλάλησεν αὐτοῖς (he spoke to them)

Omit. : D it^{d,(k)} syr^{s, c}
Incl. : Majority Byz

Matthew 13:49

κόσμου : (cosmos) D
αἰῶνος τούτου (this age) : N co^{sa^{ms},bo}
αἰῶνος (age) : Majority Byz

Matthew 14:2

ὃν ἐγὼ ἀπεκεφάλισα (whom I beheaded)

Incl. : D it^{a,b,ff^{1},h} vg^{mss}
Omit. : Majority Byz

Matthew 14:3

Φιλίππου (of Philip)

Omit. : D it^{mss} vg^{mss} Augustine
Incl. : Majority Byz

Matthew 14:8
ἐπὶ πίνακι (on a platter)

Omit. : D
Incl. : Majority Byz

Matthew 15:26

οὐκ ἔξεστιν (it is not permitted) : D it^{mss} syr^{s, c} Origen
οὐκ ἐστιν (it is not) : 1293. Tertullian Eusebius
οὐκ καλὸν ἐστιν (right it is not) : 544. 1010. geo
οὐκ ἔστιν καλὸν (it is not right) : Majority Byz

Matthew 15:30

κωφούς (mute)

Omit. : D
Incl. : Majority Byz

ἐθεράπευσεν αὐτούς πάντας (and he healed them all) : D it^{mss} sa bo^{ms}
ἐθεράπευσεν αὐτούς (and he healed them) : Majority Byz

Matthew 15:32

μήποτε ἐκλυθῶσιν ἐν τῇ ὁδῷ (lest they should faint in the way)

Omit. : D*
Incl. : Majority Byz

Matthew 15:39

Μαγαδάν (Magadan) : א* B D
Μαγεδάν (Magedan) : א^{2} Δ^{lat} lat^{mss} syr^{s, c,(p)} co^{sa} Eusebius
Μαγδαλάν (Magdalan) : C N W 33. 565. 579. it^{q} mae-1 co^{bo}
Μαγδαλά (Magdala) : L Δ^{gr} Θ ƒ^{1} ƒ^{13} 22 892. Byz syr^{h}

Matthew 16:4

καὶ μοιχαλὶς (and adulterous)

Omit. : D it^{mss}
Incl. : Majority Byz

Matthew 16:16

ὁ υἱὸς τοῦ θεοῦ τοῦ σῴζοντος (the son of the saving God) : D*
ὁ υἱὸς τοῦ θεοῦ τοῦ ζῶντος (the son of the living God) : Majority Byz

Matthew 16:20

ἐπετίμησεν (rebuked) : D B* it^{e} syr^{c} Origen^{mss}
διεστείλατο (ordered) : Majority Byz

Matthew 17:1

ὄρος ὑψηλὸν λίαν (very high mountain) : D Eusebius
ὄρος ὑψηλὸν κατʼ ἰδίαν (high mountain by themselves) : Majority Byz

Matthew 17:2

λευκὰ ὡς χιών (white as snow) : D lat^{mss} syr^{c} bo^{mss}
λευκὰ ὡς τὸ φῶς (white as the light) : Majority Byz

Matthew 17:12b

οὕτως καὶ ὁ υἱὸς τοῦ ἀνθρώπου μέλλει πάσχειν ὑπʼ αὐτῶν (So also the Son of Man is about to suffer at their hands)
Incl. in 17:12 : Majority Byz
Place in 17:13 : D it^{a,b,c,d,e,ff^{1},ff^{2},g^{1},n,r^{1}}

Matthew 18:10

τῶν μικρῶν τούτων τῶν πιστευόντων εἰς ἐμέ (these little ones who believe in me) : D it^{mss} vg^{mss} syr^{c} co^{sa^{mss}}
τῶν μικρῶν τούτων (these little ones') : Majority Byz

Matthew 18:16

μαρτύρων (witnesses) : Majority Byz
omit : D

Matthew 18:18

omit: D* it^{n}
ἔσται δεδεμένα ἐν οὐρανῷ, καὶ ὅσα ἐὰν λύσητε ἐπὶ τῆς γῆς (will be bound in heaven, and whatever you should loosen upon the earth) : Majority Byz

Matthew 19:25

ἐξεπλήσσοντο καὶ ἐφοβήθησαν σφόδρα (they were astonished and they were afraid exceedingly) : D it^{mss} vg^{mss} syr^{c}
omit : Majority Byz

Matthew 19:29

ἢ πατέρα (or father)

Incl. : Majority Byz
Omit. : D

ἢ γυναῖκα (or wife)

Incl. : Majority Byz
Omit. : D

Matthew 20:28

ὑμεῖς δὲ ζητεῖτε ἐκ μικροῦ αὐξήσαι καὶ ἐκ μείζονος ἔλαττον εἶναι εἰσερχόμενοι δὲ καὶ παρακληθέντες δειπνῆσαι μὴ ἀνὰκλινεσθε εἷς τοὺς ἐξἔχοντας τόπους μήποτε ἐνδοξότερον σου ἐπέλθῃ καὶ προσελθὼν ὁ δειπνοκλήτωρ εἴπῃ σοι ἔτι κάτω χὼρει καὶ καταισχυνθήσῃ ἐὰν δὲ αναπεσής εἷς τόν ἥττονα τόπον καὶ ἐπέλθῃ σου ἥττων ἐρεῖ σοι ὁ δειπνοκλήτωρ σύναγε ἔτι ἄνω καὶ ἔσται σοι τοῦτο χρήσιμον But seek to increase from that which is small, and to become less from that which is greater. When you enter into a house and are summoned to dine, do not sit down at the prominent places, lest perchance a man more honorable than you come in afterwards, and he who invited you come and say to you, "Go down lower"; and you shall be ashamed. But if you sit down in the inferior place, and one inferior to you come in, then he that invited you will say to you, "Go up higher"; and this will be advantageous for you.

Incl. : D Φ it^{a aur b cd e ff^{1} ff^{2}(g^{1}) h(m)n r^{1} r^{2}} vg^{mss} syr^{(c), p^{ms}h^{mg}} Juvencus Hilary
Omit. : Majority Byz

Matthew 21:44

Omit. : D 𝔓^{104} 33 it^{a,b,d,e,ff^{1}, ff^{2}, r^{1}} syr^{s} Irenaeus^{lat} Origen Eusebius
Incl. : Majority Byz

Matthew 22:13

Ἄρατε αὐτόν ποδῶν καὶ χειρῶν καὶ Βάλετε αὐτόν εἰς τὸ σκότος τὸ ἐξώτερον (Take him by his feet and his hands and cast him into the outer darkness) : D it^{a,b,c,d,e,ff^{1},ff^{2},h,q,r^{1}} syr^{s, c} Irenaeus^{lat} Lucifer
Δήσαντες αὐτοῦ πόδας καὶ χεῖρας ἐκβάλετε αὐτὸν εἰς τὸ σκότος τὸ ἐξώτερον (After binding him by his feet and his hands, cast him into the outer darkness) : א B L Θ 085 ƒ^{1} 22 700. 892. it^{aur,f,g^{1},l} vg syr^{p} co Didymus
Δήσαντες αὐτοῦ πόδας καὶ χεῖρας ἄρατε αὐτόν καὶ ἐκβάλετε εἰς τὸ σκότος τὸ ἐξώτερον (After binding him by his feet and his hands, take and cast him into the outer darkness) : C (M) W Δ (Φ) 0102 33. (565.)(579.) (1241.) (1424.) Byz it^{f} syr^{(h)}
Βάλετε εἰς τὸ σκότος τὸ ἐξώτερον (cast^{pl} [him] into the outer darkness) : ƒ^{13}

Matthew 22:17

Εἰπέ οὖν ἡμῖν (Therefore, tell us)

Omit. : D it^{a,b,d,e,ff^{1},ff^{2},q,r^{1}} syr^{s} bo^{ms}
Incl. : Majority Byz

Matthew 22:24

τὴν γυναῖκα αὐτοῦ (his wife)

Omit. : D
Incl. : Majority Byz

Matthew 22:46

ἐκείνης τῆς ὥρας (from that hour) : D W ƒ^{1} 1506 it^{a,d,q} syr^{s, c} bo^{mss} Origen
ἐκείνης τῆς ἡμέρας (from that day) : Majority Byz

Matthew 23:26

καὶ τῆς παροψίδος (and the plate)

Omit. : D Θ ƒ^{1} 2* 700. it^{a,d,e,ff^{2},r^{1}} syr^{s} Irenaeus^{lat} Clement
Incl. : Majority Byz

Matthew 23:34

καὶ ἐξ αὐτῶν μαστιγώσετε ἐν ταῖς συναγωγαῖς ὑμῶν (and of them, ye will scourge in your synagogues)

Omit. : D it^{a} Lucifer
Incl. : Majority Byz

Matthew 24:31

ἀρχομένων δὲ τούτων γίνεσθαι ἀναβλέψατε καὶ ἐπάρατε τὰς κεφαλὰς ὑμῶν διότι ἐγγίζει ἡ ἀπολύτρωσις ὑμῶν (But when these things begin happening, look up and lift up your heads, because that your redemption is approaching)

Incl. : D 1093. it^{b,c,d,h,q,r^{1}}
Omit. : Majority Byz

Matthew 24:41

δύο ἐπὶ κλίνης μιᾶς εἷς παραλαμβάνεται καὶ εἷς ἀφίεται (two upon one bed; one taken, and one left)

Incl. : D ƒ^{13} it^{mss} vg^{mss} Origen^{mss}
Omit. : Majority Byz

Gospel of Mark
Mark 1:6

καὶ ζώνην δερματίνην περὶ τὴν ὀσφὺν αὐτοῦ (and a leather belt roundabout his waist)

Omit. : D it^{a,b,d,ff^{2},r^{1},t} vg^{ms}
Incl. : Majority Byz

Mark 1:7

κύψας (stoop)

Omit. : D Θ ƒ^{13} 28.* 565. ℓ^{844,2211} it^{mss}
Incl. : Majority Byz

Mark 5:9

απεκριτη : D
λεγιων ονομα μοι : א B C L Δ
απεκριθη λεγων : E 565. 700.
λεγεων : A W Θ ƒ^{1} ƒ^{13} Byz

Mark 10

Verse Order 23, 25, 24, 26 : D
Verse Order 23, 24, 25, 26 : Majority Byz

Mark 13:2

και μετα τριων ημερων αλλος αναστησεται ανευ χειρων (and within three days another will arise without hands)

Incl. : D W it^{a,b,c,d,(e),ff^{2},i,(k),n,r^{1}} Cyprian
Omit. : Majority Byz

Mark 15:34 (see Psalms 22:2)

ὠνείδισάς με (insult me) : D it^{c, (i), k} syr^{h}
ἐγκατέλιπές με (forsaken me) : א B Ψ 059. vg Ptolemy Justin Martyr Eusebius
με ἐγκατέλιπες (forsaken me) : Majority Byz

Gospel of Luke
Luke 4:17

ἁπτύξας (touched) : D*
ἀναπτύξας (unrolled) : א D^{c} K Δ Θ Π Ψ ƒ^{1} ƒ^{13} 28. 565. 700. 1009. 1010. 1071. 1079. 1216. 1230. 1242. 1253. 1344. 1546. 1646. 2148. 2174. Byz
ἀνοίξας (opened) : A B L W Ξ 33. 892. 1195. 1241. ℓ 547 syr^{s, h,pal} bo sa

Luke 6:5

τῇ αὐτῇ ἡμέρᾳ, θεασάμενός τινα ἐργαζόμενον τῷ σαββάτῳ, εἶπεν αὐτῷ· Ἄνθρωπε, εἰ μὲν οἴδας τί ποιεῖς, μακάριοις εἶ· εἰ δὲ μὴ οἴδας, ἐπικατάρατος καὶ παραβάτης εἶ τοῦ νόμου. (On that same day, seeing someone working on the Sabbath, he (Jesus) said to him, 'Man, if you know what you do, blessed are you; but if you do not know, you are cursed and a transgressor of the law.')

Incl. : D
Omit. : Majority Byz

Luke 7:1

και εγενετο οτε ετελεσεν ταυτα τα ρηματα λαλων ηλθεν : D (it syr^{h(mg)}
επειδη επληρωσεν παντα τα ρηματα αυτου εις τας ακοας του λαου εισηλθεν : Majority Byz

Luke 7:2

παις (boy servant) : D
δουλος (slave) : Majority Byz

Luke 9:55–56

και ειπεν, Ουκ οιδατε ποιου πνευματος εστε (But He turned and rebuked them and He said: You do not know what manner of spirit you are of) : D (ℓ 1127^{m}) D geo Epiphanius
καὶ εἶπεν, Οὐκ οἰδατε οἵου πνεύματός ἐστε ὑμεῖς : Byz
Omit. : א A B C L Δ Ξ 28. 33. 71. 157. al

Luke 11:2

ἐφ ἡμᾶς ἐλθέτω σου ἡ βασιλεία (Let thine kingdom come upon us) : D
ἐλθέτω τὸ πνεῦμα σου τὸ ἄγιον εφ ημας και καθαρισατω ημας (May your Holy Spirit come upon us and cleanse us) : 162. 700.
ἐλθέτω ἡ βασιλεία σου (May your kingdom come) : Byz
ἐλθάτω ἡ βασιλεία σου (May your kingdom come) : C P W Δ ƒ^{13} 1241
Omit. : geo

Luke 22:1

ηγγισεν : D Codex Regius
εγγιζεν : Majority Byz

Luke 23:34

ὁ δὲ Ἰησοῦς ἔλεγεν πάτερ, ἄφες αὐτοῖς, οὐ γὰρ οἴδασιν τί ποιοῦσιν (Then Jesus said, "Father, forgive them, for they know not what they are doing")

Omit. : 𝔓^{75} א^{a} B D W Θ 0124 31.* 38. 435. 597.* 1241. 1808.* it^{a,b^{c},d} syr^{s} co
Incl. : Majority Byz

Luke 24:1

ἀρώματα (aromatics)

Omit. : D it^{mss} syr^{s, c} co^{sa}
Incl. : Majority Byz

Luke 24:2

ἐλθοῦσαι δὲ εὗρον (Then, upon arriving, they found)

Omit. : D 070 it^{c} sa
Incl. : Majority Byz

Luke 24:3

τοῦ κυρίου Ἰησοῦ (of the Lord Jesus)

Omit. : D it^{a,b,d,e,ff^{2},l,r^{1}}
Incl. : Majority Byz

Luke 24:6

οὐκ ἔστιν ὧδε, ἀλλὰ ἠγέρθη

Omit. : D it^{a,b,d,e,ff^{2},l,r^{1}} arm^{mss} geo^{mss}
Incl. : Majority Byz

Luke 24:7

ἁμαρτωλῶν (sinful)

Omit. : D it^{a,b,d,e,ff^{2},l,r^{1}}
Incl. : Majority Byz

Luke 24:9

ἀπὸ τοῦ μνημείου (from the tomb)

Omit. : D it^{a,b,d,e,ff^{2},l,r^{1}} arm geo
Incl. : Majority Byz

Luke 24:10

ἦσαν δὲ (Now they were)

Omit. : A D W Γ 788. 1241. ℓ^{mss} it^{d,e} syr^{s, c}
Incl. : Majority Byz

Luke 24:17

καὶ ἐστάθησαν (and they stood still)

Omit. : D Cyril
Incl. : Majority Byz

Luke 24:36

καὶ λέγει αὐτοῖς εἰρήνη ὑμῖν (and said to them, "Peace be unto you")

Omit. : D it^{a,b,e,ff^{2}},l,r^{1}
Incl. : Majority Byz

Luke 24:37

φαντασμα (phantasma) : D Marcion^{Tert}
πνευμα (spirit) : Majority Byz

Luke 24:42

και απο μελισσιου κηριου (and honeycomb of the beehive)

Omit. : 𝔓^{75} א A B D L W P 579. 1079. 1377.* 2411. it^{d,e} syr^{s} sa bo^{mss}
Incl. : Majority Byz

Luke 24:46

ἐκ νεκρῶν (from the dead)

Omit. : D sa
Incl. : Majority Byz

Luke 24:49

τοῦ πατρός (of the Father)

Omit. : D it^{e}
Incl. : Majority Byz

Luke 24:51

καὶ ἀνεφέρετο εἰς τὸν οὐρανόν (and he was being uplifted into the sky)

Omit. : א* D it^{a,b,d,e,ff^{2},l}
Incl. : Majority Byz

Luke 24:52

προσκυνήσαντες αὐτὸν (upon worshiping him)

Omit. : D it^{a,b,d,e,ff^{2},l} syr^{s}
Incl. : Majority Byz

Luke 24:53

αἰνοῦντες (praising) D it^{a,b,d,e,ff^{2},l,r^{1}} vg^{mss}
εὐλογοῦντες (eulogizing) 𝔓^{75} א B C* L syr^{s,pal} sa bo geo
αἰνοῦντες καὶ εὐλογοῦντες (praising and eulogizing) A C^{2} W Δ Θ Ψ ƒ^{1} ƒ^{13} 33 157 579 Byz it^{aur,c,f,q} vg^{mss} syr^{p,h} arm

Gospel of John
John 1:4

ἐν αὐτῷ ζωὴ ἐστίν (in Him is life) : D א it sa^{mss}
ἐν αὐτῷ ζωὴ ᾓν (in Him was life) : Majority Byz

John 4:51

υιος σου : D^{gr}
υιος αυτου : D^{lat}

John 4:9

οὐ γὰρ συγχρῶνται Ἰουδαῖοι Σαμαρίταις (for Jews have no dealings with Samaritans)

Omit. : *א D it^{a,b,d,e,j}
Incl. : Majority Byz

John 5:39

καὶ ἐκεῖναί εἰσιν ἁμαρτάνουσαι περὶ ἐμοῦ· (and they are the ones who sin concerning Me) : D
καὶ ἐκεῖναί εἰσιν αἱ μαρτυροῦσαι περὶ ἐμοῦ· (and they testify concerning Me) : Majority Byz

John 6:1

της θαλασσης της Γαλιλαιας εις τα μερη της Τιβεριαδος : D Θ 892. 1009. 1230. 1253. it^{b,d,e}
τῆς θαλάσσης τῆς Γαλιλαίας τῆς Τιβεριάδος : Majority Byz

John 7:8

εγω ουκ αναβαινω (I am not going) : א D K 1241.
εγω ουπω αναβαινω (I am not yet going) : B L T W Θ Ψ 0105 0180 0250 ƒ^{1} ƒ^{13} Byz

John 8:46

Omit. : D
Incl. : Majority Byz

John 11:54

εἰς τὴν χώραν Σαμφουριν ἐγγὺς τῆς ἐρήμου (into the region of Sepphoris near the wilderness) : D
εἰς τὴν χώραν ἐγγὺς τῆς ἐρήμου (into the region near the wilderness) : Majority Byz

John 12:8

Omit. : D
Incl. : Majority Byz

John 17:11

καὶ οὐκέτι εἰμὶ ἐν τῷ τούτῳ τῷ κόσμῳ (and no longer am I in this world) : D b c f ff^{2} q
καὶ οὐκέτι εἰμὶ ἐν τῷ κόσμῳ (and no longer am I in the world) : Majority Byz

ουκετι ειμι εν τω κοσμω· και εν τω κοσμω ειμι (no longer am I in this world, and I am in the world)

Incl. : 𝔓^{107}^{(vid)} D (a c) r^{1}
Omit. : Majority Byz

John 20:8

και ιδεν και ουκ επιστευσεν (and saw and did not believe) : D
και ιδεν και επιστευσεν (and saw and believed) : Majority Byz

Acts of the Apostles
Acts 20:28

του κυριου (of the Lord) : D 𝔓^{74} C* E Ψ 33. 36. 453. 945. 1739. 1891.
του θεοῦ (of God) : א B 614. 1175. 1505. vg syr bo^{ms}; Cyprian
τοῦ κυρίου καὶ θεοῦ (of the Lord and of God) : C^{c3} L 323 1241 Byz

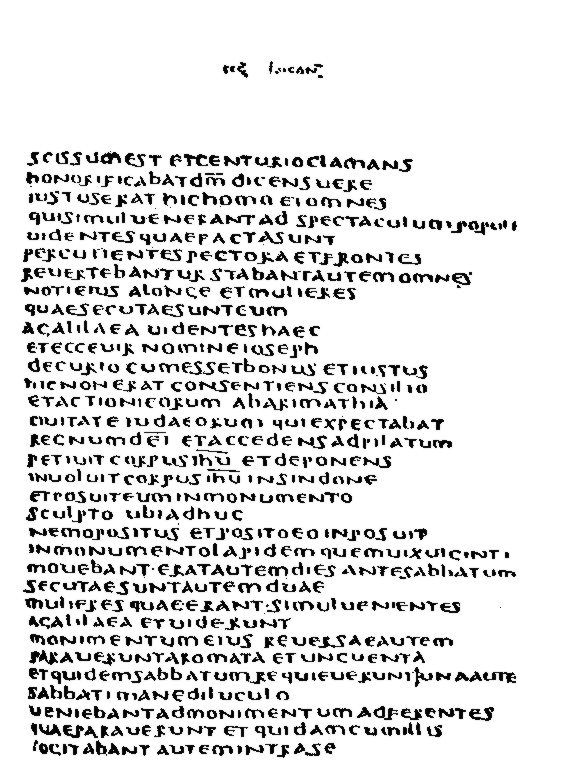
A sample of the Latin of the Codex Bezae

== History ==
The codex's place of origin is still disputed; both Gaul (France) and southern Italy have been suggested. Other proposed places of origin include Egypt, Palestine and Beirut.

The manuscript is believed to have been repaired at Lyon (France) in the ninth century, as revealed by a distinctive ink used for supplementary pages. It was closely guarded for many centuries in the monastic library of St Irenaeus at Lyon. The manuscript was consulted, perhaps in Italy, for disputed readings at the Council of Trent, and was at about the same time collated for Stephanus's edition of the Greek New Testament. During the upheavals of the Wars of Religion in the 16th century, when textual analysis had a new urgency among the Reformation's Protestants, the manuscript was stolen from the monastic library in Lyon when French Huguenots ransacked the library in 1562. It was delivered to the Protestant scholar Theodore Beza, the friend and successor of Calvin, who gave it in 1581 to the University of Cambridge, in the comparative security of England, which accounts for its double name. It remains in the Cambridge University Library (Nn. II 41).

Scholar John Mill collated and biblical scholar Johann Jakob Wettstein transcribed (in 1716) the text of the codex. Both did their editions of the Greek Testament, but both did their work carelessly. A much better collation was made about 1732 by John Dickinson.

In 1787, the University of Cambridge appointed Dr Thomas Kipling to edit a facsimile edition which appeared in two volumes in 1793.

The English cleric Frederick H. A. Scrivener edited the text of the codex in 1864 (rewritten text of the codex) and published a photographic facsimile in 1899.

The importance of the manuscript is such that a colloquium held at Lunel, Hérault, in the south of France on 27–30 June 1994 was entirely devoted to it. Papers discussed the many questions it poses to our understanding of the use of the Gospels and Acts in early Christianity, and of the text of the New Testament.

== See also ==
- Biblical manuscript
- Codex Glazier
- List of New Testament Latin manuscripts
- List of New Testament uncials
- Western non-interpolations
