= Minuscule 28 =

Greek minuscule manuscript of the New Testament

- New Testament manuscript
- Text: Gospels
- Date: 11th-century
- Script: Greek
- Now at: National Library of France
- Size: 23.1 cm by 18.7 cm
- Type: Caesarean text-type, Byzantine text-type
- Category: III / V
- Hand: carelessly written
- Note: marginalia

Minuscule 28, formerly known as Colbertinus 4705, is a Greek minuscule manuscript of the New Testament, written on vellum. It is designated by the siglum 28 in the Gregory-Aland numbering of New Testament manuscripts, and ε 168 in the von Soden numbering of New Testament manuscripts. Using the study of comparative writing styles (palaeography), it has been dated to the 11th-century. It contains marginal notes (marginalia), and has several gaps.

== Description ==
The manuscript is a codex (precursor to the modern book format), containing the text of the four Gospels on 292 parchment leaves (23.1 cm by 18.7 cm), with numerous gaps. The text is written in one column per page, 19 lines per page. The words are written continuously without any separation. Biblical scholar Frederick H. A. Scrivener describes the letters as "written carelessly by an ignorant scribe... but has many unique readings and interpolations", a sentiment echoed by biblical scholar F. G. Kenyon: "[Min. 28 is] carelessly written, but containing many noticeable readings". The initial letters are written in red ink.

The text is divided according to chapters (known as κεφαλαια / kephalaia), whose numbers are given at the margin, and the titles (known as τιτλοι / titloi) written at the top of the pages. There is also a division according to the Ammonian Sections (in Mark 234, the last section in 16:9), with references to the Eusebian Canons added by later hand (these were an early system of dividing the four Gospels into different sections). It contains the tables of the κεφαλαια / tables of contents before each Gospel (however these are inaccurate), and subscriptions at the end of each Gospel. It also contains the Synaxarion (an index to the weekly lessons to be read out in a church). The manuscript was extensively altered by a later hand.

A collation of the manuscript was published by biblical scholars Kirsopp Lake and Silva Lake.

Gaps in the manuscript

Matthew 7:19-9:22, 14:33-16:10, 26:70-27:48, Luke 20:19-22:46, John 12:40-13:1; 15:24-16:12, 18:16-28, 20:19-21:4, 21:19-end). John 19:11-20:20, 21:5-18 were added by a later hand in the 15th century.

== Text ==
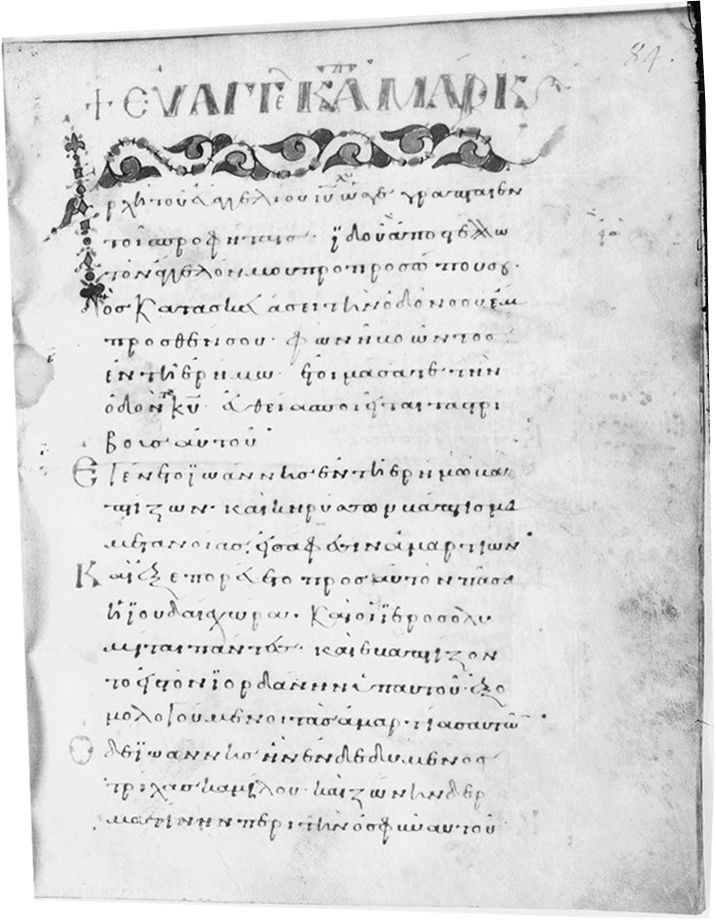
Beginning of Mark's Gospel in Minuscule 28

The Greek text of this codex is considered a representative of the Caesarean text-type in the Gospel of Mark, and the Byzantine text-type in rest of the Gospels. The text-types are groups of different New Testament manuscripts which share specific or generally related readings, which then differ from each other group, and thus the conflicting readings can separate out the groups. These are then used to determine the original text as published; there are three main groups with names: Alexandrian, Western, and Byzantine. Textual critic Kurt Aland placed it in Category III of his New Testament manuscript text classification system, but only in Gospel of Mark, and in the rest of the Gospels placed it in Category V. Category III manuscripts are described as having "a small but not a negligible proportion of early readings, with a considerable encroachment of [Byzantine] readings, and significant readings from other sources as yet unidentified", and Category V manuscripts are "Manuscripts with a purely or predominantly Byzantine text." The manuscript is described as containing "many noteworthy readings, especially in Mark[.]"

According to the Claremont Profile Method (a specific analysis method of textual data), it represents the textual family K^{x} in Luke 10 and Luke 20. In Luke 1 it has mixture of the Byzantine families.

It contains the Pericope Adulterae (John 7:53–8:11).

Some Notable readings

Matthew 10:34

μάχην καὶ μάχαιραν (warfare and a sword) : 28
μάχαιραν (a sword) : Majority of manuscripts

Mark 1:1

Ἰησοῦ (Jesus) : 28*
Ἰησοῦ χριστοῦ (Jesus Christ) : 28^{c} א* Θ ℓ 2211 sa^{ms}
Ἰησοῦ Χριστοῦ υἱοῦ θεοῦ (Jesus Christ, Son of God) : א^{c1} B D L W Γ sy co
Ἰησοῦ χριστοῦ, υἱοῦ τοῦ θεοῦ (Jesus Christ, Son of [the] God) : Majority of manuscripts

Mark 9:49

πᾶς γὰρ πυρὶ ἁλισθήσεται (for all shall be salted by fire) : 28 א (εν πυρι) B L W Δ ƒ^{1} ƒ^{13} 565 700 ℓ 260 sy^{s} sa
πᾶς γὰρ πυρὶ ἁλισθήσεται, καὶ πᾶσα θυσία ἁλὶ ἁλισθήσεται. (for all shall be salted by fire, and every sacrifice shall be salted with salt) : Majority of manuscripts

Mark 10:19

μη αποστερησης (do not defraud)

omit. : 28 B* K W Δ Ψ ƒ^{1} ƒ^{13} 579 700 ℓ 10 ℓ 950 ℓ 1642 ℓ 1761 al sy^{s} arm geo
incl. : B^{c2} Majority of manuscripts

Mark 10:47

Ναζωρηνός (Nazorine) : 28 D l* q^{c}
Ναζαρηνός (Nazarene) : Majority of manuscripts

== History ==
The manuscript is dated by the INTF to the 11th-century.

It was added to the list of the New Testament manuscripts by biblical scholar Johann Jakob Wettstein, who gave it the number 28. It was examined and described by biblical scholar and theologian John Mill, Wettstein, biblical scholar Johann M. A. Scholz, and Paulin Martin. C. R. Gregory saw the manuscript in 1885.

It is currently housed at the Bibliothèque nationale de France (Gr. 379) at Paris.

== See also ==
- List of New Testament minuscules
- Biblical manuscript
- Textual criticism
