= Codex Sangallensis 48 =

Uncial 037
- New Testament manuscript
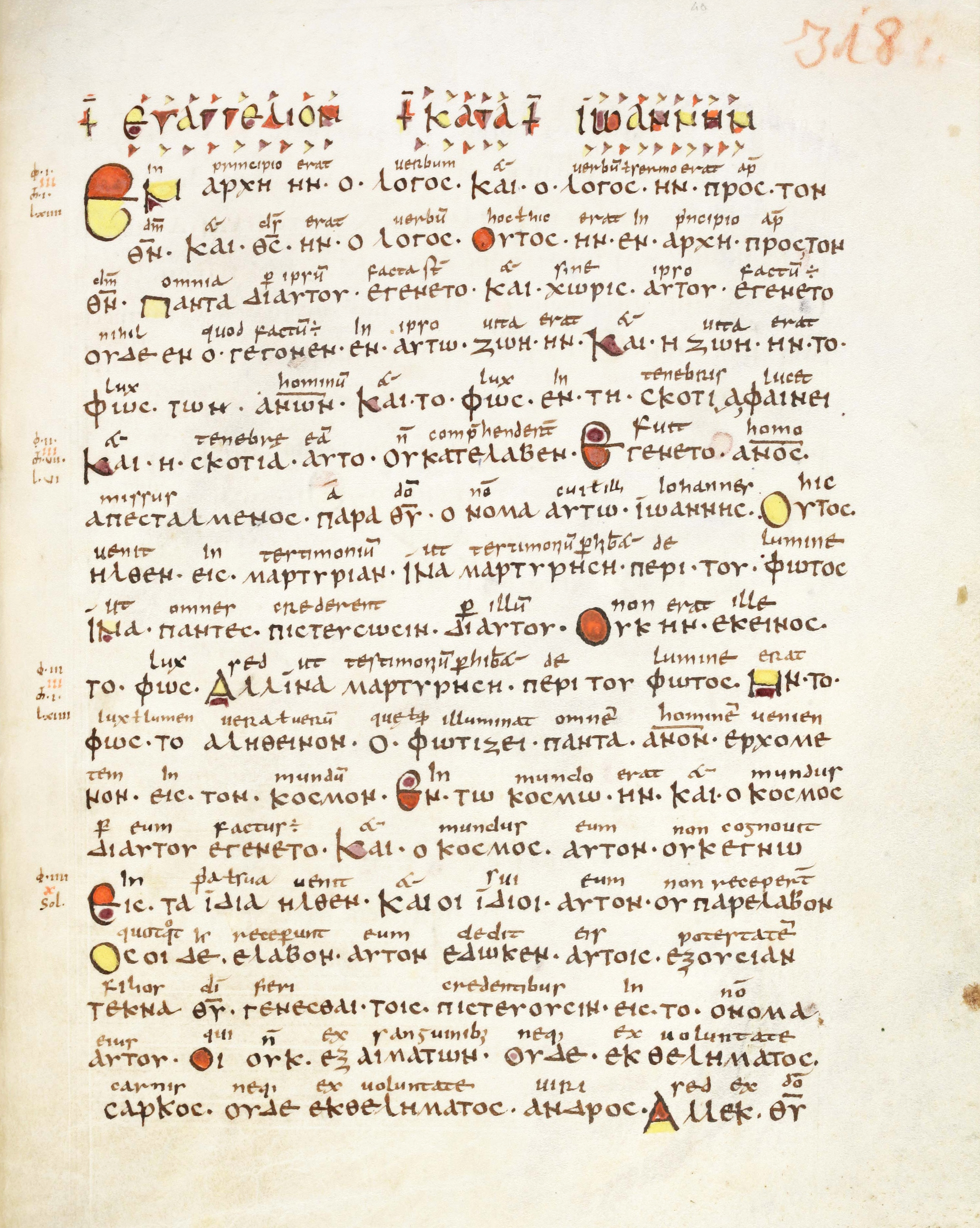
- The beginning of John
- Name: Sangallensis
- Sign: Δ
- Text: Gospels
- Date: 9th century
- Script: Greek-Latin
- Now at: Abbey library of Saint Gall
- Size: 23 cm by 18.5 cm
- Type: Alexandrian / Byzantine
- Category: III

Codex Sangallensis is a Greek-Latin diglot uncial manuscript of the four Gospels. It is designated by Δ or 037 in the Gregory-Aland numbering of New Testament manuscripts, and ε76 in the von Soden numbering of New Testament manuscripts. The Latin text is written above the Greek text, interlinear style.

Using the study of comparative writing styles (palaeography), it is usually dated to the 9th century CE, though a few palaeographers would place it in the 10th century CE. It was given its current name by biblical scholar Johann Martin Augustin Scholz in 1830.

== Description ==
The manuscript is a codex (precursor to the modern book format), containing a near complete text of the four Gospels on 198 parchment leaves (sized 23 cm by 18.5 cm), with one missing section: John 19:17-35. The text is written in one column per page, 17-28 lines per page, in large semi-uncial letters using brown and black ink. The Latin text is written above the Greek (as in Codex Boernerianus (G^{p})), and in minuscule letters. Each word (in both the Greek and Latin lines) is separated by a middot (·). No breathing or accent marks are utilised. Many initial letters are decorated using mixtures of red, yellow, purple, or bluish-green ink. It is decorated, but the decorations were made by an inartistic hand. The manuscript from which Sangallensis was copied (known as its Vorlage/exemplar) was likely written stichometrically. Quotations from the Old Testament are indicated.

The text is divided according to the Ammonian Sections, whose numbers are given in the margin, with references to the Eusebian Canons (both early systems of dividing the four Gospels into different sections) in Roman letters written below the Ammonian Section numbers. The top of the pages contain the chapter titles (known as τιτλοι / titloi). It contains Prologues, the Epistle of Jerome to Pope Damasus I (a letter outlining Jerome's Latin translation of the Gospels), the Eusebian Canon Tables, and the tables of contents (known as κεφαλαια / kephalaia) before each gospel in both Greek and Latin. Brief subscriptions are written after each gospel. Jerome's Preface to Matthew is also included before the first Gospel.

The text of Mark 7:16 was originally omitted but inserted by a later hand, and Mark 11:26 is omitted without being added later. The Pericope Adulterae (John 7:53-8:11) is omitted, but a blank space was left for the remainder of the 348th page. The texts of Matthew 16:2b–3 and John 5:4 are included without any indications of spuriousness, but Luke 22:43 is marked by asterisks to express doubt as to its inclusion.

== Text ==
Greek Text

The Greek text is considered a representative of the Alexandrian text-type, with a similar text to Codex Regius (L) in the Gospel of Mark, but the Byzantine text-type in the rest of the gospels (as in Codex Athous Lavrensis (Ψ)). The text-types are groups of different New Testament manuscripts which share specific or generally related readings, which then differ from each other group, and thus the conflicting readings can separate out the groups. These are then used to determine the original text as published; there are three main groups with names: Alexandrian, Western, and Byzantine. Biblical scholar Kurt Aland placed it in Category III of his New Testament manuscript classification system. Category III manuscripts are described as having "a small but not a negligible proportion of early readings, with a considerable encroachment of [Byzantine] readings, and significant readings from other sources as yet unidentified."

Latin text

The Latin version seems a mixture of the Vulgate with Old Latin Itala readings, and altered and accommodated to the Greek as to be of little critical value. The interlinear Latin text of the codex is remarkable for its alternative readings in almost every verse, e.g. uxorem vel coniugem (wife or spouse) for την γυναικα (the wife) in Matthew 1:20.

Some Textual variants

Matthew 1:12

Ζορομβαβαβελ (Zorombababel) - Δ
Ζοροβαβελ (Zorobabel) - All other witnesses.

Matthew 27:35

τὰ ἱμάτιά μου ἑαυτοῖς καὶ ἐπὶ τὸν ἱματισμόν μου ἔβαλον κλῆρον (my clothes for themselves, and for my cloak they cast lots) - Δ Θ 0250 ƒ^{1} ƒ^{13} 537 1424
omit - All other witnesses.

Mark 4:19

η αγαπη του πλουτου (the love of wealth) - Δ
απαται του πλουτου (deceived by wealth) - D Θ 565 it
απαται του κοσμου (deceived by the world) - W 1424 f
η απατη του πλουτου (the deception of wealth) - All other witnesses.

Mark 9:49

πᾶς γὰρ πυρὶ ἁλισθήσεται (for all shall be salted with fire) – Δ B L W ƒ^{1} ƒ^{13} 28 565 700 ℓ 260 syr^{s} sa
πᾶς γὰρ πυρὶ ἁλισθήσεται καὶ πᾶσα θυσία ἁλὶ ἁλισθήσεται (for all shall be salted with fire, and ever sacrifice shall be salted with salt) – All other witnesses.

John 1:42

ἐμβλέψας δὲ (Then, having looked) - Δ 𝔓^{75} Θ ƒ^{13} 33 892 1241. 1424 pm pc
ἐμβλέψας (Having looked) - 𝔓^{66} א A B K L Γ Ψ ƒ^{1} 565 579 700 pm

== History ==
The earliest history of the manuscript is unknown, however it is likely that it was written in the West, possibly by an Irish monk in the St. Gallen monastery at some point during the 9th century. It can not be dated earlier, because it has a reference to the (heretical) opinions of Gottschalk of Orbais (died 868) at Luke 13:24 and John 12:40.

The siglum Δ was given to it by biblical scholar Johann Scholz. It was examined by Martin Gerbert (1773), Scholz, H. C. M. Rettig, biblical scholar J. Rendel Harris, and Oscar von Gebhardt. Rettig thought that Codex Sangallensis is a part of the same manuscript as Codex Boernerianus. The text of the codex was edited and published by Rettig in 1836, but with some mistakes (e.g. in Luke 21:32 οφθαλμους (eyes) instead of αδελφους (brothers)).

There are references made to the opinions of Gottschalk (died 868) in Luke 13:24; John 12:40, and to Hand Aragon (died 941). The codex is currently located in the Abbey library of St. Gallen (shelf number 48) at St. Gallen in Switzerland.

== Gallery ==
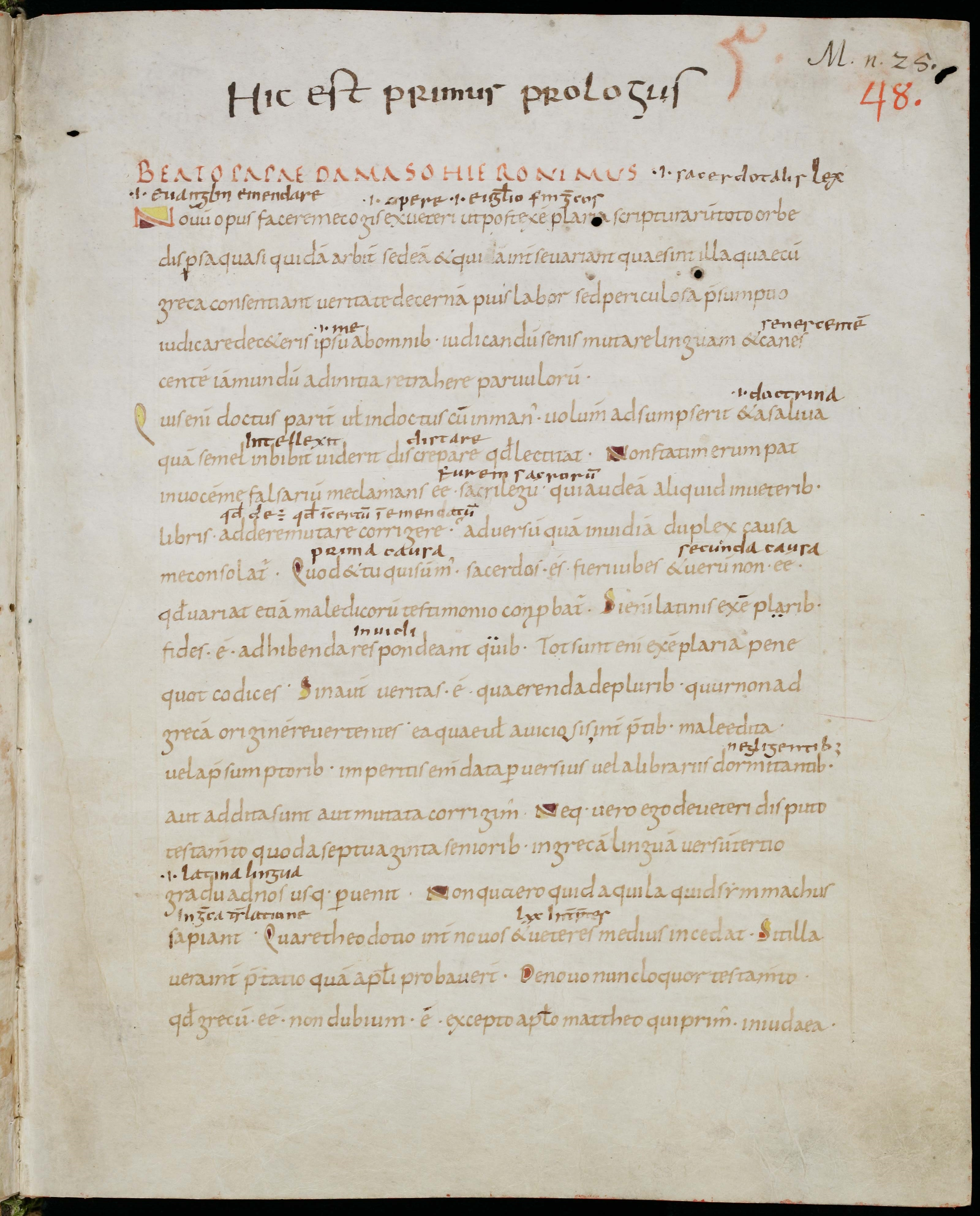
The epistle of Jerome to Pope Damasus I

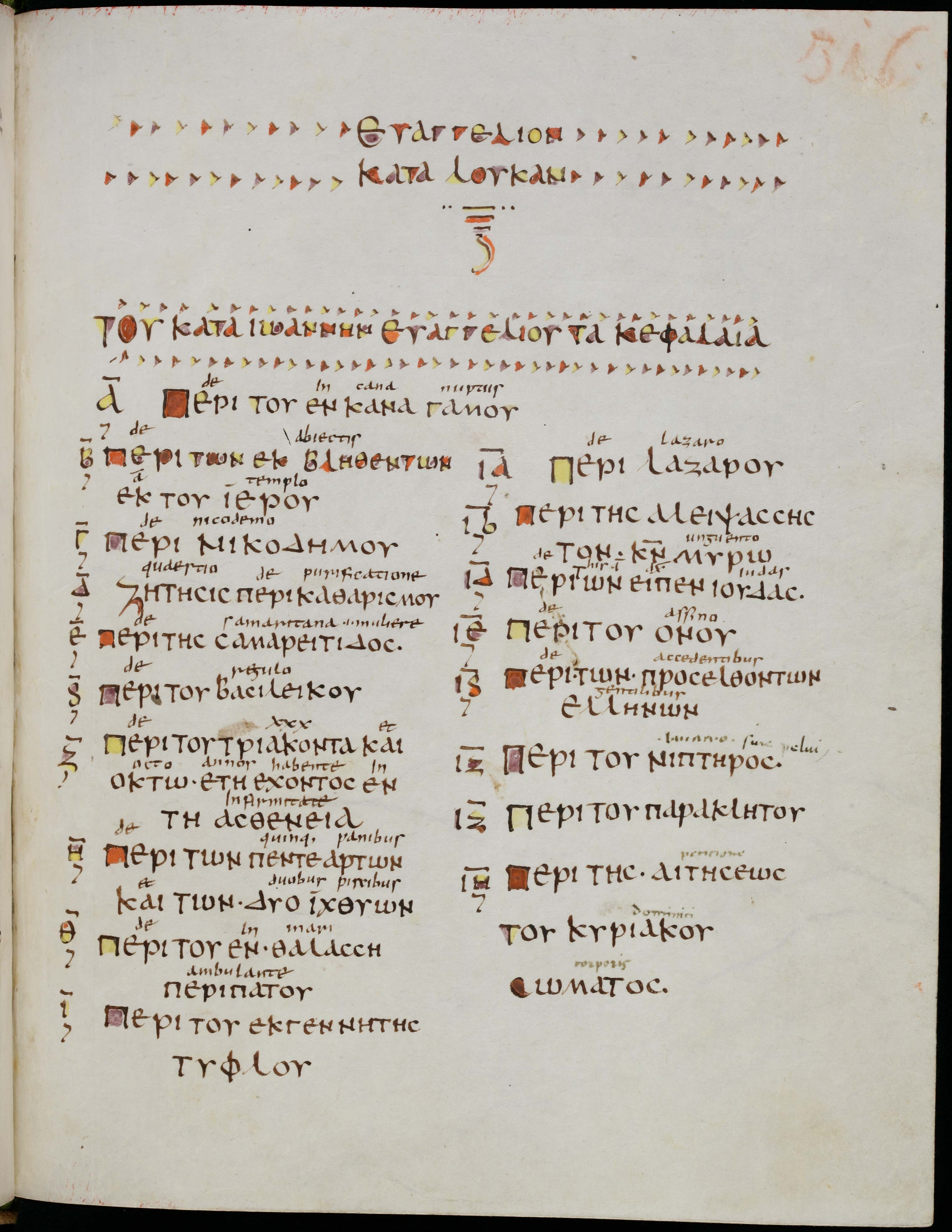
Tables of κεφαλαια for John

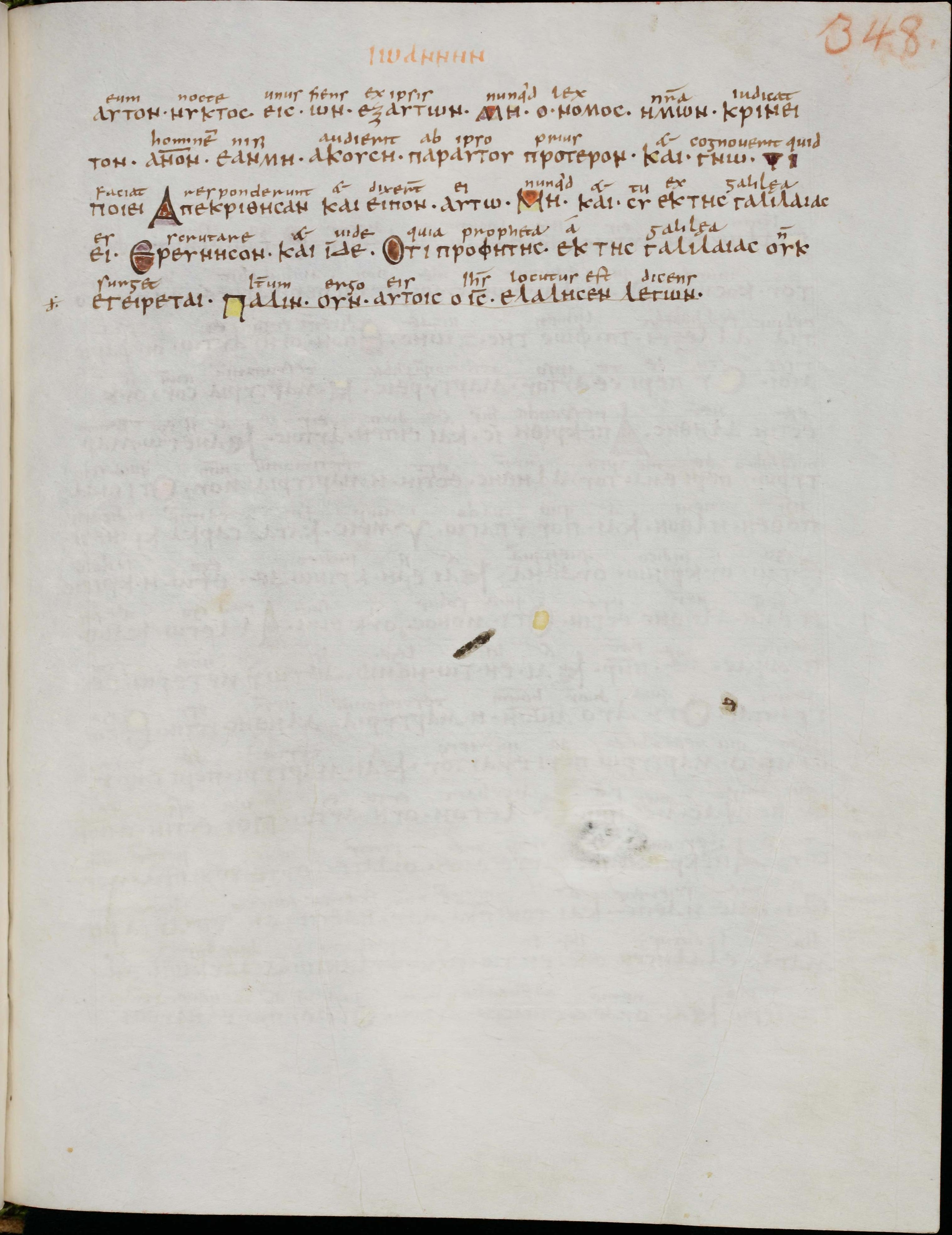
It lacks John 7:53-8:11

== See also ==
- List of New Testament Latin manuscripts
- List of New Testament uncials
- Textual criticism
