= Codex Colbertinus =

Codex Colbertinus is a manuscript of the Latin New Testament. It contains the entirety of the New Testament and includes the apocryphal Epistle to the Laodiceans. It is designated by 6 or c in the Beuron register of Latin New Testament manuscripts. Using the study of comparative writing styles (palaeography), it has been assigned to the 11th or 12th century. It was probably produced in southern France.

== Description ==
The manuscript is a codex (precursor to the modern book format), containing the text of the entire Latin New Testament including the Epistle to the Laodiceans written on 146 folios (292 pages), sized 17.5 x 9.5 cm. The text is written in two columns of 40 lines in black ink. There are decorations in red, green and blue ink, along with illustrations before each of the four gospels.

Prologues precede all of the books, with chapter lists preceding each gospel and Acts. Following the book of Acts is a note regarding the apocryphal Passion of Peter and Paul, similar to that seen in Codex Complutensis I.

== Text ==
Its version of the four Gospels and Book of Acts follows the Old Latin, while the rest of the New Testament follows the Vulgate. Thus the codex represents a mixed form of the Latin New Tesament text. It is generally a European Old Latin text, named Itala, strongly interpolated by Afra. Both texts were contaminated by Jerome's Vulgate.

In Matthew 27:38, the two robbers who were crucified on either side of Jesus are named as Zoatham (right-hand) and Camma (left-hand), but in Mark 15:27 they are named Zoatham and Chammatha.

== History ==
The earliest history of the manuscript is unknown. The text of the codex was edited by scholar Johannes Belsheim in 1888, scholar Heinreich Vogels in 1953, and by Jülicher. The manuscript is currently housed at the National Library of France (shelf number Latin 254) in Paris.

== See also ==
- List of New Testament Latin manuscripts
