= Minuscule 1689 =

13th century New Testament manuscript

- New Testament manuscript
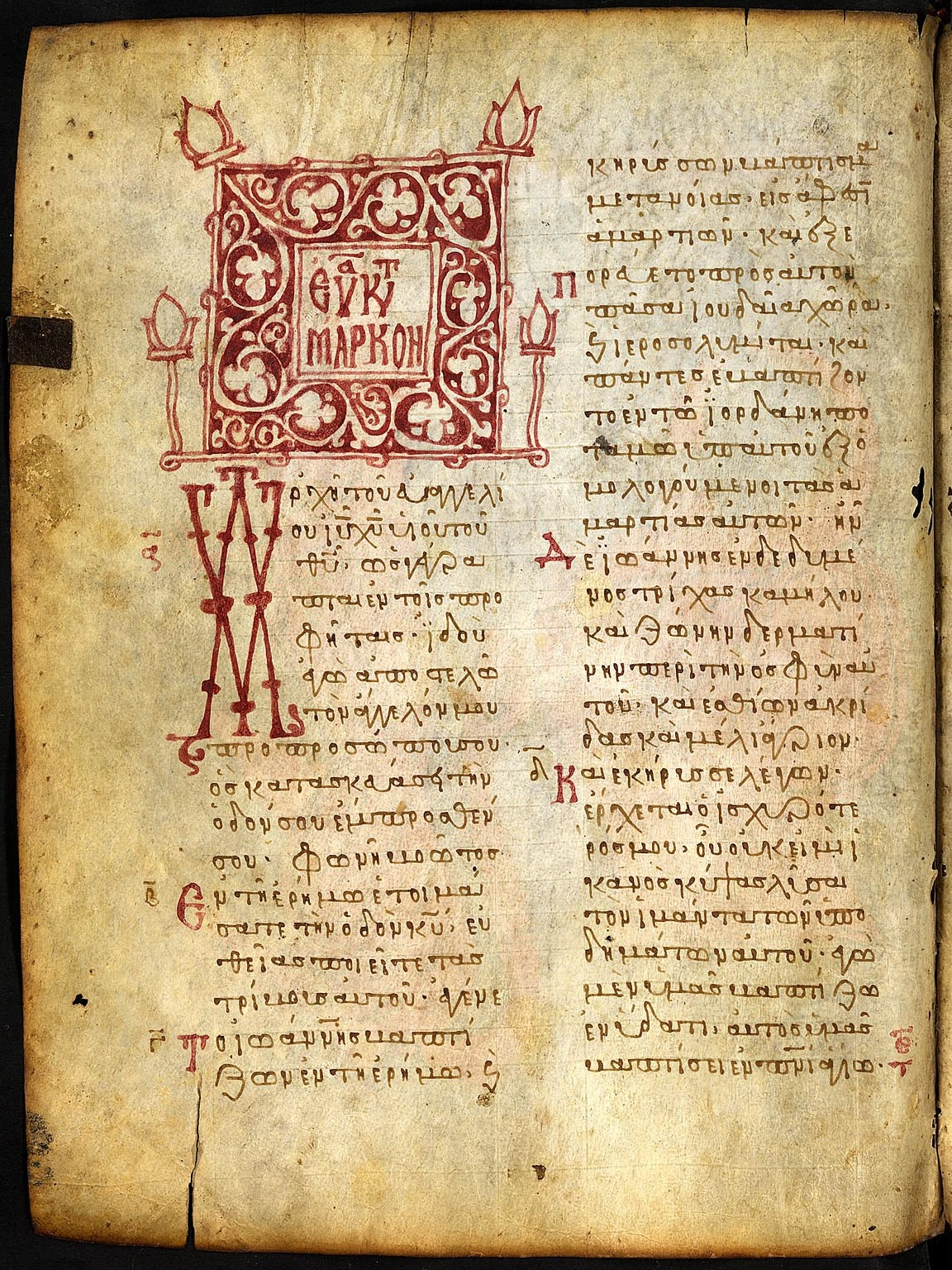
- Text: Gospels
- Date: 13th century
- Script: Greek
- Now at: Academy of Sciences Library, Czech Republic
- Size: 20 cm by 15.8 cm
- Type: Caesarean text-type
- Category: III
- Note: ƒ^{13}

Minuscule 1689 is a 13th-century Greek minuscule manuscript of the New Testament on parchment. It is designated by the siglum 1689 in the Gregory-Aland numbering of New Testament manuscripts, and ε1054 in the von Soden numbering of New Testament manuscripts.The manuscript is in very good condition. It is part of a group of New Testament manuscripts known as Family 13 (ƒ^{13}).

The manuscript went missing after World War I when it and other manuscripts were moved by Bulgarian troops, but was no longer found among the collection when the manuscripts were sent to be housed in the National Library of Greece. It was rediscovered in 2006 among the manuscripts at the Academy of Sciences Library in Prague.

== Description ==
The manuscript is a codex (precursor to the modern book), containing the text of the four Gospels, written on 197 parchment leaves (sized 20 cm by 15.8 cm). The text is written in two columns per page, 25 lines per page.

The hand has been described as "beautiful and professional", and the parchment as "beautifully clear and clean". The main text is written in a brownish-black ink colour, and contains lectionary notes beginning (αρχη / arche) and ending (τελος / telos) marks throughout in red ink. All three types of Greek accents (used to indicate voiced pitch changes) are written, along with breathing marks (utilised to designate vowel emphasis) which are almost always rounded. It also contains the Eusebian apparatus, but not the Ammonian (both early systems of dividing the four Gospels into different sections).

Supposedly "spurious" material (readings considered unoriginal to the text) is marked by symbols in the left margin, next to where the spurious line begins. The tables of contents (known as κεφαλαια / kephalaia) are included before each Gospel, except for the Gospel of Matthew, which appears lost. At the end of each Gospel is a horizontal red vine illustration written across the last column, followed by a subscription which notes the number of pages, lines (known as στιχοι / stichoi), and phrases (known as ρηματα / rhemata) written in the Gospel. The only exception is the Gospel of John, which rather than having a subscription is immediately followed by the Synaxarion (a list of saint's days).

== Text ==
The Greek text of the codex has been considered as a representative of the Caesarean text-type. The text-types are groups of different New Testament manuscripts which share specific or generally related readings, which then differ from each other group, and thus the conflicting readings can separate out the groups. These are then used to determine the original text as published; there are three main groups with names: Alexandrian, Western, and Byzantine. The Caesarean text-type however (initially identified by biblical scholar Burnett Hillman Streeter) has been contested by several text-critics, such as Kurt and Barbara Aland.

Due to the manuscript going missing for nearly a century (see History below), readings from the manuscript had to be gleaned from the apparatus of textual critic Hermann von Soden's Die Schriften des neuen Testaments, in ihrer ältesten erreichbaren Textgestalt / hergestellt auf Grund ihrer Textgeschichte (volume 1), but due to lack of confidence in the accuracy of von Soden's apparatus, how the manuscript compared to other Family 13 members was debatable, and von Soden's list of readings of the manuscript were stated to be "too unreliable to be used". In their reconstruction of Family 13's archetype for the Gospel of Mark, biblical scholars Kirsopp Lake and Silva Lake therefore didn't cite any reading from 1689, and it was based only on the nine remaining Family 13 manuscripts (13, 69, 124, 346, 543, 788, 826, 828, 983).

Unlike other members of Family 13, the manuscript doesn't include the Pericope Adulterae after Luke 21:38, but instead (along with other Family 13 manuscripts minuscule 174 and 230) in its usual place after John 7:52. It might betray knowing this relocation of the pericope due to a red obelus written at the start of John 7:53, however there is only a usual lectionary ending mark after John 8:11. It further breaks the norm from other Family 13 manuscripts, as it includes the text of Matthew 16:2b–3, and the text of Luke 22:43-44 is kept at its usual place, and not put after Matthew 26:39. There is a marginal note after Matt 26:39 which refers the reader to look at Luke 22:43, and there is an obelus at the start of Luke 22:43 and another at the end of Luke 22:44, with another marginal note which refers the reader to Matt 22:39.

== History ==
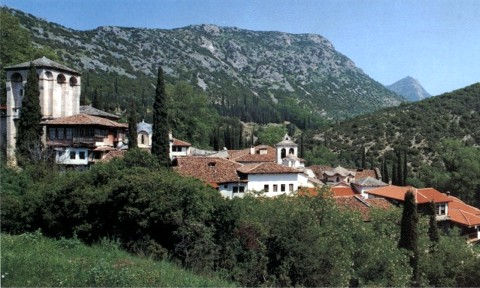
Monastery of Timios Prodromos, original location of Minuscule 1689

Textual critic Caspar René Gregory saw the manuscript in 1902, and read the colophon as indicating the date of copying as ͵ϛ̅ψ̅η̅ (1200 CE, literally 6708 years after Creation). In the same year it was seen by Kirsopp Lake, who read the colophon as indicating the date of copying as ͵ϛ̅ψ̅ϙ̅ (1282 CE = 6790 after Creation). The manuscript is therefore dated by the INTF to the 13th century.

The colophon indicates the codex was written by a copyist named David Megglaboiton.

The manuscript was originally housed at the Library of the Monastery of Timios Prodromos near Serres, Greece, but during World War I, all its manuscripts were taken to Sofia by Bulgarian troops. After the end of the war, the Greek government claimed all the manuscripts, and had them all brought back where the majority were placed in the National Library of Greece in Athens. However the codex was no longer found among the collection and was thought lost. It was subsequently identified in 2006 at its current location at the Academy of Sciences Library (shelf number 1 TG 3), in Prague.

Since its rediscovery, readings from its Gospel of Mark portion have appeared in the ECM of Mark.

== See also ==
- List of New Testament minuscules
- Biblical manuscript
- Textual criticism
- Family 13
- Macedonian front
- Greece during World War I
