= A Collation of Four Important Manuscripts of the Gospels =

1877 book

A Collation of Four Important Manuscripts of the Gospels, full title: A Collation of Four Important Manuscripts of the Gospels: With a View to Prove Their Common Origin, and to Restore the Text of Their Archetype. The book was published in 1877 by Thomas Kingsmill Abbott on behalf of his deceased colleague William Hugh Ferrar.

William Hugh Ferrar (1826–1871) before his death collated four minuscules (Greek handwritten cursive texts) to demonstrate that they shared a common provenance. The four collated minuscules are: 13, 69, 124, 346 (known as Family 13 or Ferrar Family). Ferrar intended to establish that these four codices are derived from a common archetype, and to exhibit as nearly as possible the actual text of this archetype of these four minuscules, a text, therefore, more ancient and authoritative than of any of these manuscripts separately.

The book was published in 1877 by T. K. Abbott on behalf of William Hugh Ferrar, who had died six years previous.

Sigla
L – codex 69
M – 346
P – 13
V – 124
S – Stephanus' text edited by Scrivener
L_{1} – L prima manu
L_{2} – L secunda manu
