= William Hugh Ferrar =

Irish classical scholar (1826–1871)

William Hugh Ferrar (1826–1871), a Latinist, was an Irish classical scholar at Trinity College Dublin.

Ferrar studied at Trinity College Dublin, successfully completing the scholarship exams in 1855. He was a senior moderator and top of his class in mathematics in 1856. In 1859 he was elected as a fellow of Trinity College Dublin and served as Junior Dean from 1864-1866.

In 1868, Ferrar discovered that four medieval manuscripts, namely minuscules 13, 69, 124, and 346, were closely related texts. They are descendants of an archetype from Calabria in southern Italy or Sicily. Now they are known as Ferrar Group or Family 13.

He became Professor of Latin at Trinity College Dublin in 1870. Ferrar died in Sydney, New South Wales on 15th May 1871.

A Ferrar Memorial Scholarship was founded in his memory in 1874 for students taking a course in comparative philology. As this programme is no longer run, the scholarship is now used to support a postgraduate research student working in ancient philology.

== Works ==
- W. H. Ferrar, A Comparative Grammar of Sanskrit, Greek and Latin (London, 1869)
- W. H. Ferrar, A Collation of Four Important Manuscripts of the Gospels, ed. T. K. Abbott (Dublin: Macmillan & Co., 1877) - edited posthumoustly.

== See also ==
- Ferrar Group
