= Minuscule 826 =

- New Testament manuscript
- Text: Gospels
- Date: 12th century
- Script: Greek
- Now at: Biblioteca della Badia
- Size: 22.8 cm by 17.5 cm
- Type: Caesarean text-type
- Category: III
- Note: beautiful

Minuscule 826 is a Greek minuscule manuscript containing the New Testament Gospels written on parchment. It is designated as 826 in the Gregory-Aland numbering of New Testament manuscripts, and ε218 in the von Soden numbering of New Testament manuscripts. Using the study of comparative writing styles (palaeography), it has been assigned to the 12th century. It contains marginal notes (known as marginalia). It is one of the manuscripts which comprises the text-ual family group known as the Ferrar group or Family 13.

== Description ==
The manuscript is a codex (precursor to the modern book), containing the text of the four Gospels written on 233 parchment leaves (sized 22.8 cm by 17.5 cm). The text is written in two columns per page, 25–26 lines per page. The text is divided according to the chapters (known as κεφαλαια / kephalaia), and according to the smaller Ammonian Sections (in Mark 234 sections, the last numbered section in 16:9). The numerals of the κεφαλαια are given in the margin, and their titles (known as τιτλοι / titloi) are written at the top of the pages. The Ammonian Sections are given with a reference to the Eusebian Canons (written under the Ammonian Section numbers). It contains the Eusebian Canon tables at the beginning, tables of contents (also known as κεφαλαια) before each Gospel, lectionary markings for liturgical use, incipits, liturgical books: Synaxarion and Menologion, subscriptions at the end each of the Gospels with the numbers of lines (known as στιχοι / stichoi). According to biblical scholar and textual critic Frederick Henry Ambrose Scrivener, it is a beautiful codex.

Biblical scholar Kirsopp added the manuscript to the list of Family 13 members in 1941. Along with the minuscules 13, 346, 543, and 828, the manuscript forms a sub-group within the Ferrar family known as a, which according to Lake "if 826 were printed verbatim its text would only differ from the reconstructed text of a in perhaps half a dozen readings."

== Text ==
The Greek text of the codex has been considered as a representative of the Caesarean text-type. The text-types are groups of different New Testament manuscripts which share specific or generally related readings, which then differ from each other group, and thus the conflicting readings can separate out the groups. These are then used to determine the original text as published; there are three main groups with names: Alexandrian, Western, and Byzantine. The Caesarean text-type however (initially identified by biblical scholar Burnett Hillman Streeter) has been contested by several text-critics, such as Kurt and Barbara Aland. Hermann von Soden classified it to the textual family I^{ιc}.

According to Kurt and Barbara Aland, in a number of test-passages it supports the Byzantine text against the "original" 157 times, original against the Byzantine 27 times, and 77 times it agrees with both. It also has 60 independent or distinctive readings. Kurt Aland placed it in Category III of his New Testament manuscript classification system. Category III manuscripts are described as having "a small but not a negligible proportion of early readings, with a considerable encroachment of [Byzantine] readings, and significant readings from other sources as yet unidentified." According to the Claremont Profile Method (a specific analysis of textual data), it represents textual family ƒ^{13} (the Ferrar Family) in Luke 1, Luke 10, and Luke 20, as a perfect member of the family.

In its main text it lacks the passage of Matthew 16:2b–3, however this was added by a later hand in the margin. It lacks the text of the Christ's agony at Gethsemane (Luke 22:43–44). The text of the Pericope Adulterae (John 7:53–8:11) is relocated and placed after Luke 21:38, as seen in other members of ƒ^{13}.

== History ==
The manuscript was examined and described by scholar Antonio Rocci in 1882. William Henry Simcox collated a major part of Luke as per Gregory's request. It was examined by biblical scholars Kirsopp Lake and Jacob Geerlings. According to Geerlings it is the archetype of family 13 (the Ferrar Family). The manuscript was written in Calabria, in Rhegium. Lake photographed the whole manuscript in 1900. The whole manuscript was collated for textual critic Herman von Soden, however it unknown as to whom did the collation.

Biblical scholar Caspar René Gregory dated the manuscript to the 12th century, whereas other palaeographers dated it to the 11th century. The manuscript is currently dated by the INTF to the 12th century. It was added to the list of New Testament manuscripts by Scrivener (as 624) and Gregory (as 826^{e}). Gregory saw it in 1886. The manuscript is currently housed at the Biblioteca della Badia (A' α. 3), in Grottaferrata.

== See also ==
- List of New Testament minuscules
- Biblical manuscript
- Textual criticism
- Minuscule 828
