= Minuscule 828 =

- New Testament manuscript
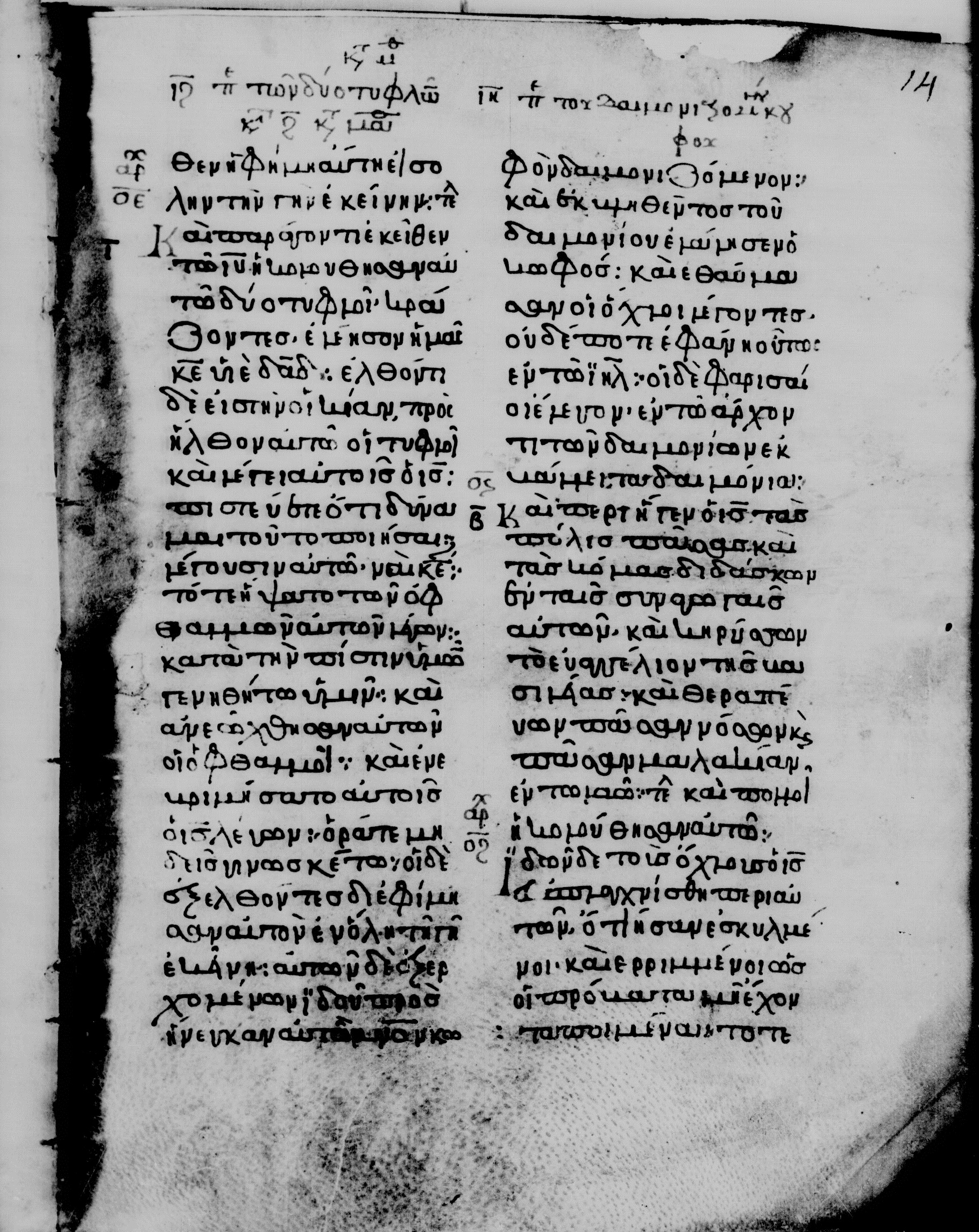
- Page of the codex with text of Matthew 9:26-36
- Text: Gospels
- Date: 12th century
- Script: Greek
- Now at: Biblioteca della Badia
- Size: 26.5 cm by 19.5 cm
- Type: Caesarean text-type
- Category: III
- Note: beautiful; ƒ^{13}

Minuscule 828 is a Greek minuscule manuscript of the New Testament on parchment. It is designated by the siglum 828 in the Gregory-Aland numbering of New Testament manuscripts, and ε219 in the von Soden numbering of New Testament manuscripts. The manuscript has survived in a complete condition. It contains marginal notes. Using the study of comparative writing styles (palaeography), the manuscript has been assigned to the 12th century.

== Description ==
The manuscript is a codex (precursor to the modern book format), containing the text of the four Gospels on 176 parchment leaves (sized 26.5 cm by 19.5 cm). The text is written in two columns per page, 27 lines per page.

The text is divided according to the chapters (known as κεφαλαια / kephalai), and according to the smaller Ammonian Sections (234 sections in Mark, the last numbered section in 16:9). The numerals of the κεφαλαια are given in the left margin, and their titles (known as τιτλοι / titloi) at the top of the pages. The Ammonian Sections are given with a references to the Eusebian Canons (written under the Ammonian Sections).

It contains the Eusebian Canon tables at the beginning, tables of contents (also known as κεφαλαια) before each Gospel, lectionary markings, the Synaxarion (liturgical book with hagiographies), subscriptions at the end of each of the Gospels, numbers of phrases (known as ρηματα / rhemata), numbers of stichoi, and pictures. According to biblical scholar Frederick H. A. Scrivener, the Eusebian Canon tables are written beautifully.

== Text ==
The Greek text of the codex has been considered as a representative of the Caesarean text-type. The text-types are groups of different New Testament manuscripts which share specific or generally related readings, which then differ from each other group, and thus the conflicting readings can separate out the groups. These are then used to determine the original text as published; there are three main groups with names: Alexandrian, Western, and Byzantine. The Caesarean text-type however (initially identified by biblical scholar Burnett Hillman Streeter) has been contested by several text-critics, such as Kurt and Barbara Aland. Textual critic Hermann von Soden classified it to the textual family I^{ιc}. Biblical scholar Kirsopp Lake placed the manuscript in the Family 13 group of minuscules, and in a sub-group along with minuscules 13, 346, and 826 which he designated as group a.

According to textual critics Kurt and Barbara Aland, it supports the Byzantine text 148 times against the original, the original 27 times against the Byzantine, and agrees 77 times with both texts; it has 64 independent or distinctive readings. Kurt Aland placed it in Category III of his New Testament manuscript classification system. Category III manuscripts are described as having "a small but not a negligible proportion of early readings, with a considerable encroachment of [Byzantine] readings, and significant readings from other sources as yet unidentified."

According to the Claremont Profile Method (a specific analysis of textual data), it represents textual family ƒ^{13} in Luke 1, Luke 10, and Luke 20. It is fragmentary in Luke 10.

In Matthew 9:35 it has the additional reading ἐν τῲ λαῷ καὶ πολλοὶ ἠκολούθησαν αὐτῷ "among the people, and many followed after Him". It lacks the text of Matthew 16:2b–3, and the text of the Pericope Adulterae (John 7:53-8:11).

== History ==
The earliest history of the manuscript is unknown. The manuscript was likely written in Calabria, possibly in Rhegium.

The manuscript was examined and described by Antonio Rocci in 1882, and later by biblical scholar Kirsopp Lake. It was added to the list of New Testament manuscripts by Scrivener (626) and biblical scholar Caspar René Gregory (828^{e}). Gregory saw it in 1886.

Gregory dated the manuscript to the 12th century, whereas other palaeographers dated it to the 11th century. The manuscript is currently dated by the INTF to the 12th century. The manuscript is currently housed at the Biblioteca della Badia (A' α. 5), in Grottaferrata.

== See also ==
- List of New Testament minuscules
- Biblical manuscript
- Textual criticism
- Minuscule 826
