= Family 13 =

Group of Greek Gospel manuscripts

List of Family 13 manuscripts
Minuscule 13	Minuscule 69
Minuscule 124	Minuscule 346
Minuscule 543	Minuscule 788
Minuscule 826	Minuscule 828
Minuscule 983	Minuscule 1689
Lectionary 547	Lectionary 574
Lectionary 1080	

Family 13, also known as the Ferrar Group, is a group of Greek Gospel manuscripts, dating from the 11th to the 15th centuries, which share a distinctive pattern of variant readings. Textual critic Hermann von Soden labelled the family as I^{i}). All are thought to derive from a lost majuscule Gospel manuscript, probably from the 7th century. The group takes its name from minuscule 13, now in Paris.

The common characteristics of Family 13 were initially identified in a group of four witnesses (minuscules 13, 69, 124, and 346); but the category has subsequently been extended, and some authorities list thirteen family members. The most obvious characteristic of the group is that these manuscripts place John 7:53-8:11 after Luke 21:38, or elsewhere in Luke's Gospel, with the text of Luke 22:43-44 placed after Matt 26:39, and the text of Matthew 16:2b–3 being absent.

Using the study of comparative writing styles (palaeography), most of the manuscripts in the family (with the exception of Minuscule 69) appear to have been written by scribes trained in Southern Italy. The group also has an affinity with Syriac manuscripts, of which a notable example is Matthew 1:16, where the Ferrar group has the same reading as Curetonian Syriac.

== History ==
Textual critic Johann Jakob Wettstein observed close affinity between minuscules 13 and 69. The affinity between minuscules 124 and 13 was remarked by Treschow and its resemblance to minuscule 69 by Andreas Birch.

The first published account of Family 13 appeared in the year 1877, in a book published by T. K. Abbott on behalf of his deceased colleague (and discoverer of Family 13), William Hugh Ferrar. Before his death, Ferrar collated four minuscules (Greek handwritten cursive texts) to definitively demonstrate that they all shared a common origin. His work, A Collation of Four Important Manuscripts of the Gospels, would be the first scientific attempt to discover the lost archetype of these four minuscules.

The four minuscules Ferrar collated are:

- Minuscule 13 (in the Bibliothèque nationale de France at Paris, France),
- Minuscule 69 (in the Leicestershire County Record Office, Leicester, UK),
- Minuscule 124 (in Vienna, Austria), and
- Minuscule 346 (in the Ambrosian Library in Milan, Italy).

Ferrar transcribed two of these minuscules himself, accepting a previous transcription of 69 done by another person as trustworthy and adequate. He accepted a handmade copy of 124 from the hand of Dr. Ceriani, the Conservator of the Ambrosian Library at the time. The result of his work demonstrates the members of Family 13 do indeed seem to share a common pattern of distinctive shared readings not seen in other manuscripts. In 1913, von Soden’s work on the Greek New Testament seemed to confirm the assertion this family descended from a common archetype.

In 1924 biblical scholar Burnett Hillman Streeter proposed that Family 13 should be classified as one branch of a distinct Caesarean text-type, differing in a number of common respects from the then established Byzantine, Western and Alexandrian text-types. This view is supported by some, but not all, subsequent scholars.

By 1941, biblical scholar and textual critic Kirsopp and his wife Silva Lake turned their attention to this important family of manuscripts. In their work on the Gospel of Mark entitled Family 13 (The Ferrar Group): The Text According to Mark, the family is characterized as consisting of 10 manuscripts (13, 69, 124, 346, 543, 788, 826, 828, 983, and 1689).

In this monograph, the Lakes thoroughly cover all that was then known about the origin of each of these manuscripts. Some of the manuscripts proposed as belonging to Family 13 appear to have links to Calabria in Southern Italy (mss 13, 124, 174, 230), and one to Albania (ms. 1689); manuscripts 124 and 174 are recorded as having been written in Calabria, and most of the family members recording menologion (verses from the New Testament arranged by month) readings for Calabrian saints. Some family members have common supplemental geographical material that appears to derive from a 7th-century original.

In 1961, Jacob Geerlings published three monographs (Matthew, Luke, and John) on the family, although some scholars regard this work as flawed by serious methodological problems. In 1982, Yvonne Burns confirmed two lectionaries, ℓ547 and ℓ574 both belong to Family 13, in subgroup B with 69, 124, and 788. In 2026 it was announced that another lectionary might also belong to Family 13, with scholar Darrell Post noting that ℓ1080 agrees with the family in John 11; however a full collation needs to be done to determine whether it is a family member throughout the manuscript.

Today, the family supposedly consists of at least sixteen members (13, 69, 124, 174, 230, 346, 543, 788, 826, 828, 983, 1346, 1689, 1709, L547 and L574), although the most recent work of Drs. Barbara Aland, Klaus Wachtel, and others at the Institut für neutestamentliche Textforschung in Münster, Germany, imply that some of these family members are more similar to the majority Byzantine Text, and therefore should not be included in this family at all. Research recently completed using phylogenetic software by Dr. Jac Perrin (through the auspices of ITSEE - Institute for Textual Scholarship and Electronic Editing at the University of Birmingham, UK) agrees with the conclusions of the Münster team that although the Albanian manuscripts 1141 and 2900 both contain some F13 readings, neither meet the full criteria of F13 membership. In his dissertation on the topic, Perrin lists the current continuous-text family members as GA 13, 69, 124, 346, 543, 788, 826, 828, 983, and 1689 (he did not interact with Lectionaries L547 and L574). All of these manuscripts (except 1689) are without the Pericope Adulterae in St. John's Gospel. Most of them relocate the passage after Luke 21:38. This agrees with the historical criteria first established by Ferrar-Abbott in their 1887 publication. Perrin lists 590 distinct and significant non-Majority Text readings in St. John's Gospel which identify F13 and contends in his dissertation, that relocation of the PA from John to Luke is an inadequate criterion for F13 filiality. Prior to the publication of biblical scholar Reuben Swanson's "New Testament Greek Manuscripts" in 1995, Swanson misidentified minuscule 1346 as a member of family 13.

Codex 1709 is held in the national archive at Tirana, Albania; which also holds some 46 other medieval Greek New Testament manuscripts, most of which remained uncollated and unpublished until 2008 - when they were photographed by a team from the Center for the Study of New Testament Manuscripts (Dallas, Texas). A press release from CSNTM in March 2008 reported that "one or two" of these previously unstudied manuscripts may also belong to family 13; in which case they would be the earliest surviving witnesses to this text.

== Notable readings ==
Matthew 1:16

ω μνηστευθεισα παρθενος Μαριαμ εγεννησεν Ιησουν τον λεγομενον χριστον (to whom the virgin Mary had been betrothed, begat Jesus, the one called Christ) — ƒ^{13} Θ

Matthew 27:35

τα ιματια μου εαυτοις, και επι τον ιματισμον μου εβαλον κληρον — ƒ^{13} Δ Θ 0250 ƒ^{1} 537. 1424.

Mark 9:41

επι τω ονοματι μου (upon my name) — ƒ^{13} 1344. 𝑙 44^{mg} syr^{pal}
εν ονοματι (in the name) — א^{c} A B C* K L Π Ψ ƒ^{1} 892. Peshitta
εν τω ονοματι μου (in my name) — D Δ Θ 28 565 700 1009. 1216. 1242. 2174. 𝑙 10 𝑙 32 𝑙 185 𝑙 313 𝑙 950 𝑙 1231 𝑙 1579^{mg} 𝑙 1599^{mg}
εν ονοματι μου (in my name) — א* C^{3} W X Π^{2} 1010. 1195. 1230. 1253. 1365. 1646. 2148. 𝔐 Lect

Luke 11:4

καὶ μὴ εἰσενέγκῃς ἡμᾶς εἰς πειρασμοί (and may we not be brought into temptation) — 1346.

John 8:7

αναβλεψας - ƒ^{13} U Λ 700 1424.^{mg}

John 12:5

διακοσιων - ƒ^{13} 579. 1424.

John 15:16

τουτο ποιησω, ινα δοξασθη ο πατηρ εν τω υιω (this I shall do, so the Father may be glorified by the Son) - ƒ^{13}

== See also ==
- List of New Testament minuscules
- Biblical manuscript
- Textual criticism
- Family 1
- Caesarean text-type

== Bibliography ==
- T.K. Abbott, On an Attempt to Restore Uncial Ms. of the Gospels, Hermathena vol. I, 1874, pp. 313–331.
- Burns, Yvonne. “A Newly Discovered Family 13 Manuscript and the Ferrar Lection System.” In Studia Patristica, vol. XVII, part 1, edited by Elizabeth A. Livingstone, 278– 289. Oxford: Pergamon Press, 1982.
- J. Rendel Harris, On the Origin of the Ferrar Group, (Cambridge, 1893).
- J. Rendel Harris, Further researches into the history of the Ferrar-group (1900)
- Soden, Hermann. Die Schriften des Neuen Testaments in ihrer ältesten erreichbaren Textgestalt hergestellt auf Grund ihrer Textgeschichte. Göttingen: Vandenhoeck & Ruprecht, 1913.
- Geerlings, Jacob. Family 13 – The Ferrar Group: The Text According to Matthew, Studies and Documents 19, 1961.
- Ibid for Luke, Studies and Documents 20, 1961.
- Ibid for John, Studies and Documents 21, 1962.
- Barbara Aland and Klaus Wachtel. Text und Textwert der Griechischen Handschriften des Neuen Testaments, Volume V., Das Johannesevangelium, Testellenkollation der Kapital 1-10 Band 1.1, and 1.2. New York: De Gruyter, 2005.
- Bruce M. Metzger, The Caesarean Text of the Gospels, Journal of Biblical Literature, Vol. 64, No. 4 (Dec., 1945), pp. 457–489.
- Reuben Swanson, , Title: New Testament Greek Manuscripts - Luke, Publisher: William Carey Int'l Univ Press (August 1, 1998), ISBN 0865850534, ISBN 978-0865850538, pp. ix.
