= Minuscule 124 =

- New Testament manuscript
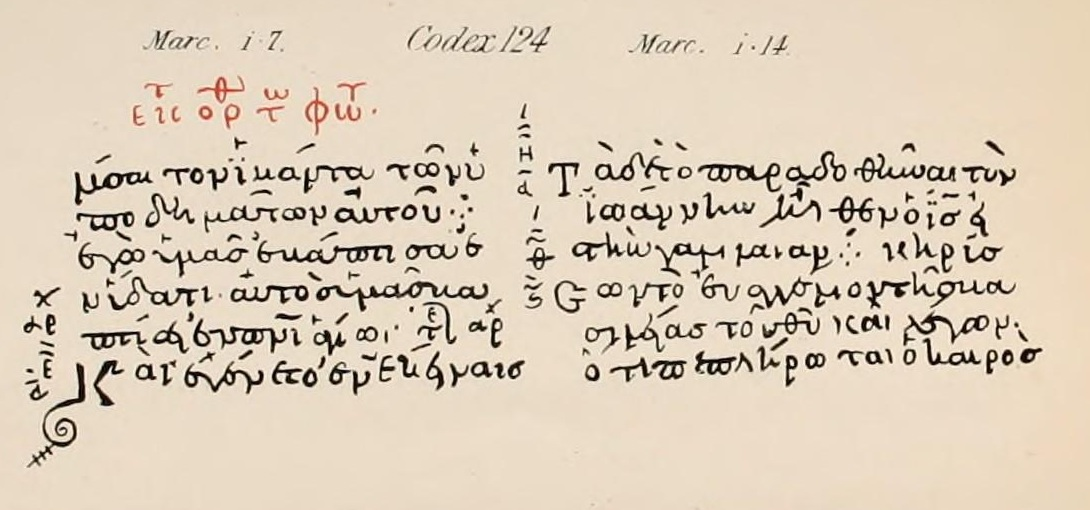
- Abbot's facsimile
- Name: Caesar-Vindobonensis
- Text: Gospels
- Date: 11th-century
- Script: Greek
- Found: 1564
- Now at: Austrian National Library
- Size: 21.7 cm by 18.8 cm
- Type: Caesarean/Byzantine text-type
- Category: III/V
- Note: member of ƒ^{13}

Minuscule 124 is a Greek minuscule manuscript of the New Testament, written on parchment. It is designated by the siglum 124 in the Gregory-Aland numbering of New Testament manuscripts, and ε 1211 in the Von Soden numbering of New Testament manuscripts. Using the study of comparative writings styles (palaeography), it has been assigned to the 11th century. It has marginalia and liturgical matter (see below).

Readings from the manuscript are cited in editions of the Novum Testamentum Graece, a critical edition of the Greek New Testament. It is considered to be a member of a group of minuscule manuscripts known as Family 13 (ƒ^{13}).

== Description ==
The manuscript is a codex (precursor to the modern book), containing the text of the four Gospels written on 188 thick parchment leaves, sized 21.7 by 18.8 cm. The text is written in two columns per page, with 25-28 lines per page. The initial letters of the different sections are written in red and blue ink, with the initial letters of each gospel being written in red, blue, brown, and green ink. It was corrected by the first hand.

The text is divided according to the chapters (known as κεφαλαια / kephalaia), whose numbers are given in the margin, with the chapter titles (known as τιτλοι / titloi) written at the top of the pages. There is also a division according to the smaller Ammonian Sections (an early division of the Gospels), with references to the Eusebian Canons written below the Ammonian Section numbers, along with information on parallel passages in other gospels written at the bottom.

It contains the Epistle to Carpianus (a letter from the early church father Eusebius of Caesarea outlining his gospel harmony system, his chapter divisions of the four gospels, and their purpose), the Eusebian Canon tables (list of chapters) at the beginning, lists of the tables of contents (also known as κεφαλαια) before each Gospel, subscriptions (end titles) at the close of each Gospel, and the liturgical books with hagiographies known as the synaxaria (a list of saint's days) and the Menologion (a reference list of monthly readings from the gospels).

According to the colophons at the end of their respective gospels, the Gospel of Matthew was written in Hebrew 8 years after the Lord's Ascension, that of Mark was written in Latin 10 years after the Ascension, Luke, in Greek, 15 years after, and John 32 years after. The colophons also state that Matthew has 2522 phrases (known as ῥήματα / rhemata), and 2560 lines (known as στίχοι / stichoi); Mark has 1675 phrases and 1604 lines; Luke has 3803 phrases and 2750 lines; and John has 1938 phrases.

Though containing the text of the Gospels, a binder has muddled up the folia, causing Matthew 18:25-23:35 to be placed after Matt 8:3, Mark 9:39-13:34 to be placed between John 14:18-19, and Luke 23:31-24:28 to be after Matt 23:35 before it returns to Matt 8:4, resulting in several issues of pagination.

== Text ==
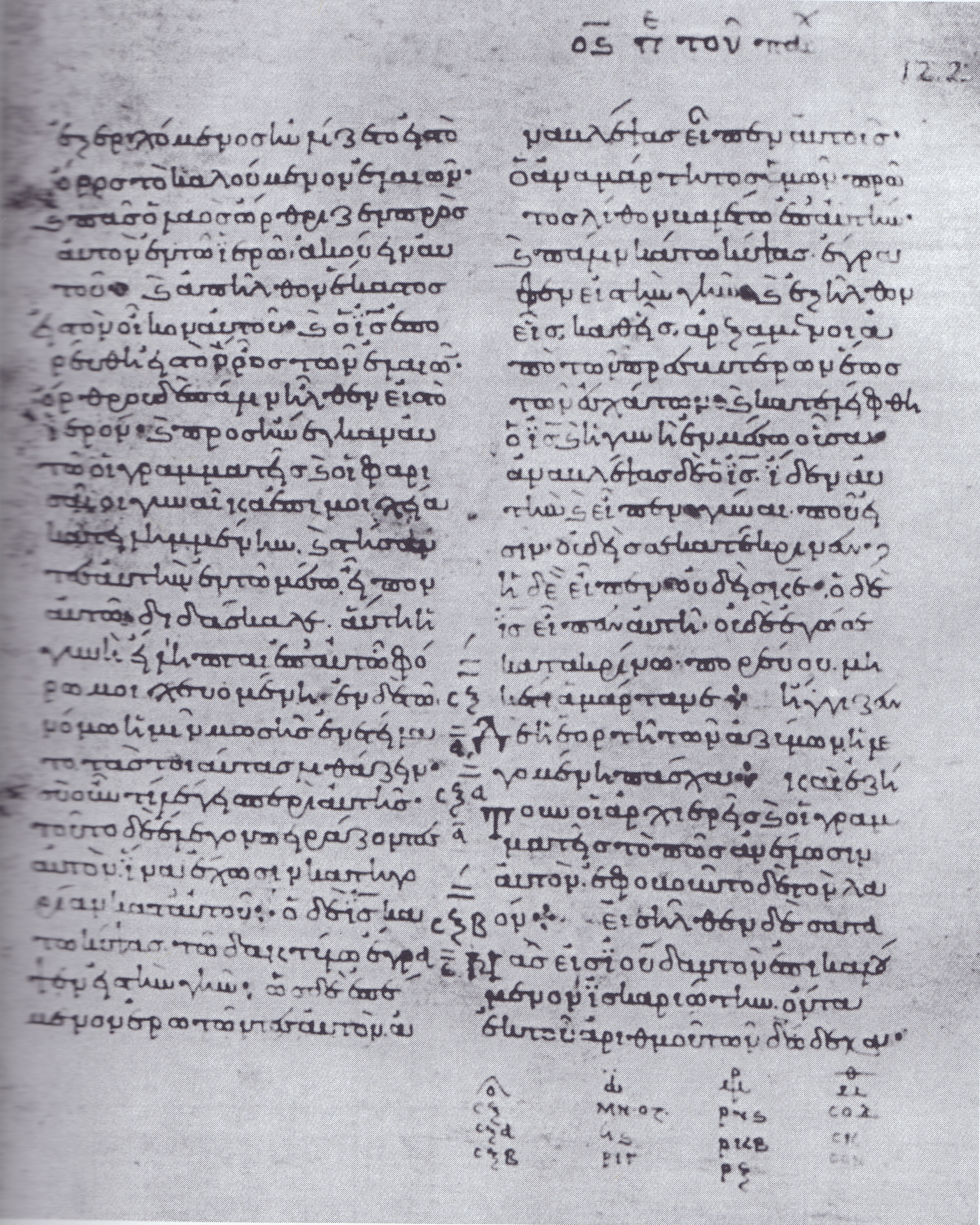
Folio 122 recto

Family 13

The manuscript is considered to belong to the textual family known as the Ferrar Group or Family 13 (ƒ^{13}). Readings from the codex and minuscule 69 were noted by Herman Treschow, a Professor of Theology at the University of Copenhagen, in 1773 in his publication, Tentamen descriptionis Codicum Veterum Graecorum Novi Foederis, to which William Hugh Ferrar, Professor of Latin at the University of Dublin, compared the texts of minuscule 13, minuscule 69, minuscule 124, and minuscule 346 in the Gospels, and discovered a new textual-family group. This comparison was published after Ferrar's early death by his friend, T. K. Abbot, in 1887 as A Collation of Four Important Manuscripts of the Gospels. Further manuscripts of ƒ^{13} would be identified, and biblical scholars Kirsopp Lake and Silva Lake would categorise them into three sub-groups, a, b, and c, with minuscule 124 coming under group b alongside the minuscules 69, 174, and 788, with the minuscules in the group being the closest to each other in the Gospel of Mark, as opposed to other ƒ^{13} manuscripts.

Text of minuscule 124

The Greek text of this codex has been considered a representative of the Caesarean text-type, as with the other members of ƒ^{13}. Textual critic Kurt Aland placed it in Category III of his New Testament manuscripts classification system. Category III manuscripts are described as having "a small but not a negligible proportion of early readings, with a considerable encroachment of [Byzantine] readings, and significant readings from other sources as yet unidentified." According to the Claremont Profile Method (a specific analysis of textual data), it is a weak member of ƒ^{13} in Luke chapters 1, 10, and 20. The manuscript was considered by biblical scholar Andreas Birch as the best of the Vienna codices.

As with other members of ƒ^{13}, the text of Luke 22:43-44 is transferred to follow after Matthew 26:39. The pericope de adulterae (John 7:53-8:11) is not placed in the Fourth Gospel, but after Luke 21:38.

== History ==
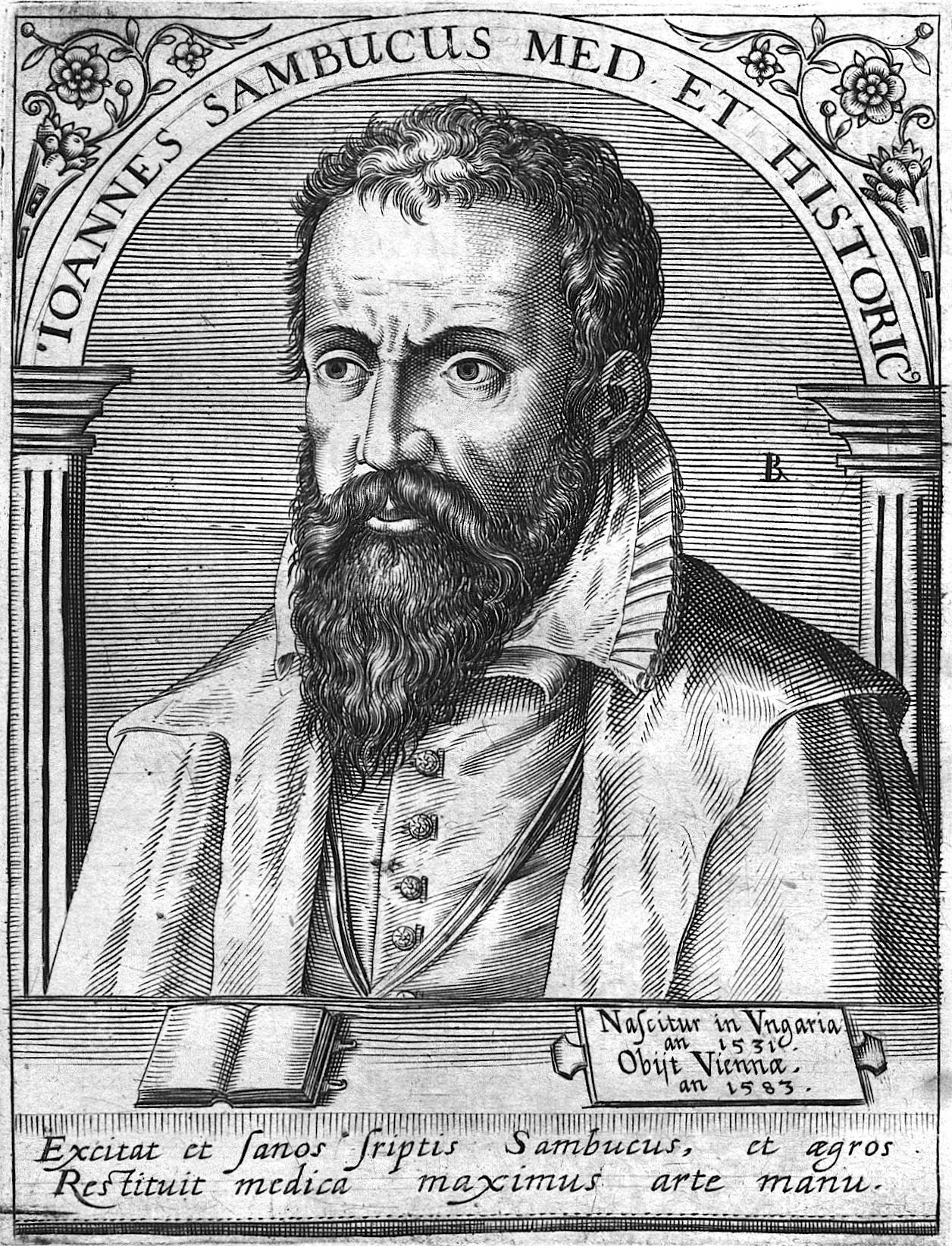
Sambucus brought the manuscript to Vienna

The manuscript was written in southern Calabria. According to biblical scholar Frederick H. A. Scrivener, "the manuscript was written in Calabria, where it belonged to a certain Leo [i.e. Leo "Hamartolos"], and was brought to Vienna probably in 1564". The person responsible for bringing it to Vienna was János Zsámboky (known as "Sambucus"), the imperial librarian, who brought it from Naples. On the reverse side of folio 188, a comment notes it once belonged to Zacharias of Taranto.

The manuscript was added to the list of New Testament manuscripts by biblical scholar Johann Jakob Griesbach. It was examined by Treschow, the biblical scholars Francis Karl Alter, Birch, William Hugh Ferrar, Thomas Kingsmill Abbott, Caspar René Gregory (in 1887), and Kirsopp & Silva Lake. Alter used it in his edition of the Greek text of the New Testament. It was collated by Ferrar. Biblical scholar J. Rendel Harris found some affinities with the Old Syriac version. Alter's initial collection of the manuscript was made against another manuscript located in Vienna, however as no one at the time had access to this manuscript, Alter's collation was considered "unintelligible". A recollation of minuscule 124 was made by Kirsopp and Silva Lake from the original manuscript.

The codex is located in the Austrian National Library (shelf number Theol. Gr. 188) at Vienna. The manuscript is currently dated by the INTF to the 11th century.

== See also ==
- List of New Testament minuscules
- Biblical manuscripts
