= List of New Testament minuscules (1301–1400) =

A New Testament minuscule is a copy of a portion of the New Testament written in a small, cursive Greek script (developed from Uncial).

== Legend ==
- The numbers (#) are the now standard system of Caspar René Gregory, often referred to as the Gregory-Aland numbers.
- Included among the cataloged minuscules are the following types of manuscripts, color coded:

Grey represents continuous text manuscripts containing only New Testament portions
Beige represents manuscripts with New Testament portions and a catena (quotations from church fathers)
Light cyan represents manuscripts of single-author commentaries who included the full Scripture text.
Light red represents manuscripts of single-author commentaries who included both the full Scripture text and a catena.
Light purple represents manuscripts of commentaries where the Scripture text was abridged.
White represents manuscript numbers no longer in use.

- Dates are estimated to the nearest 100 year increment where specific date is unknown.
- Content generally only describes sections of the New Testament: Gospels, The Acts of the Apostles (Acts), Pauline epistles, and so on. Sometimes the surviving portion of a codex is so limited that specific books, chapters or even verses can be indicated. Linked articles, where they exist, generally specify content in detail, by verse.
- Digital images are referenced with direct links to the hosting web pages, with the exception of those at the INTF. The quality and accessibility of the images is as follows:

Gold color indicates high resolution color images available online.
Tan color indicates high resolution color images available locally, not online.
Light tan color indicates only a small fraction of manuscript pages with color images available online.
Light gray color indicates black/white or microfilm images available online.
Light blue color indicates manuscript not imaged, and is currently lost or ownership unknown.
Light pink color indicates manuscript destroyed, presumed destroyed, or deemed too fragile to digitize.
Violet color indicates high resolution ultraviolet images available online.

† Indicates the manuscript has damaged or missing pages.
^{P} Indicates only a portion of the books were included.
^{K} Indicates manuscript also includes a commentary.
^{S} Indicates lost portions of manuscript replaced via supplement of a later hand.
^{abs} (abschrift) Indicates manuscript is copy.
[ ] Brackets around Gregory-Aland number indicate the manuscript belongs to an already numbered manuscript, was found to not be a continuous text manuscript, was found to be written in modern Greek versus Koine Greek, was proved a forgery, or has been destroyed.

== Minuscules 1301-1400 ==
#	Date	Contents	Pages	Institution and refs.	City, State	Country	Images
1301	12th	Gospels†	173	National Library, Supplement Grec 1266	Paris	France	BnF
1302	12th	Theophylact Commentary on the Gospels	575	Greek Orthodox Patriarchate, 88	Alexandria	Egypt	INTF
1303	1660	Gospels^{K}	431	Riom Library, 9 bis	Riom	France	INTF
1304	13th	Theophylact Commentary on the Gospels	302	Lost: Formerly Panagia Hozoviotissa Monastery, 6	Amorgos	Greece	
1305	1244	Gospels	269	Benaki Museum, MS 69	Athens	Greece	CSNTM
1306	13th	Gospels†	193	Panagia Hozoviotissa Monastery, 2	Amorgos	Greece	INTF
1307	14th	Gospels	204	Lost: Formerly, Panagia Hozoviotissa Monastery, 3	Amorgos	Greece	
1308	13th	Gospels	226	Lost: Formerly, Panagia Hozoviotissa Monastery, 4	Amorgos	Greece	
1309	11th	Gospels	277	State Historical Museum, F. 270. 1a.8 (Gr. 10)	Moscow	Russia	INTF
1310	12th/13th	Gospels†	174	State Historical Museum, S. 4	Moscow	Russia	INTF
1311	1090	Acts, General Epistles, Pauline epistles	330	Berlin State Library, Ham. 625	Berlin	Germany	INTF
1312	11th	Gospels†	264	Library of the Greek Orthodox Patriarchate, Taphos 25	Jerusalem		LOC, INTF, CSNTM
1313	11th	Gospels	212	Library of the Greek Orthodox Patriarchate, Taphos 28	Jerusalem		LOC, INTF, CSNTM
1314	11th	Gospels	295	Library of the Greek Orthodox Patriarchate, Taphos 31	Jerusalem		LOC, INTF, CSNTM
1315	12th	Gospels†, Acts†, General Epistles†, Pauline Epistles†	355	Library of the Greek Orthodox Patriarchate, Taphos 37	Jerusalem		LOC, CSNTM, INTF, CSNTM
1316	12th	Gospels	298	Library of the Greek Orthodox Patriarchate, Taphos 41	Jerusalem		LOC, INTF, CSNTM
1317	11th	Gospels†	248	Library of the Greek Orthodox Patriarchate, Taphos 42	Jerusalem		LOC, INTF, CSNTM
1318	12th	Gospels	275	Library of the Greek Orthodox Patriarchate, Taphos 46	Jerusalem		LOC, INTF, CSNTM
1319	12th	Gospels†, Acts†, General Epistles†, Pauline Epistles†	216	Library of the Greek Orthodox Patriarchate, Taphos 47	Jerusalem		LOC, INTF, CSNTM
1320	11th	Gospels	258	Library of the Greek Orthodox Patriarchate, Taphos 48	Jerusalem		LOC, INTF, CSNTM
1321	11th	Gospels	306	Library of the Greek Orthodox Patriarchate, Taphos 49	Jerusalem		LOC, INTF, CSNTM
1322	11th	Gospels	218	Library of the Greek Orthodox Patriarchate, Taphos 56	Jerusalem		LOC, CSNTM
1323	12th	Gospels	380	Library of the Greek Orthodox Patriarchate, Taphos 59	Jerusalem		LOC, INTF, CSNTM
1324	11th	Gospels	239	Library of the Greek Orthodox Patriarchate, Taphos 60	Jerusalem		LOC, INTF, CSNTM
1325	1724	Gospels	396	Library of the Greek Orthodox Patriarchate, Taphos 62	Jerusalem		LOC, INTF, CSNTM
1326	14th	Gospels	124	Library of the Greek Orthodox Patriarchate, Taphos 139	Jerusalem		LOC, INTF, CSNTM
1327	18th	Gospels (possibly copied from print ed.)	287	Library of the Greek Orthodox Patriarchate, Taphos 149	Jerusalem		LOC, CSNTM
1328	14th	Gospels, Revelation	210	Library of the Greek Orthodox Patriarchate, Sabas 101	Jerusalem		LOC, INTF, CSNTM
1329	12th	Gospels	137	Library of the Greek Orthodox Patriarchate, Sabas 166	Jerusalem		LOC, INTF, CSNTM
1329	12th	Gospels	2	Russian National Library	Saint Petersburg	Russia	INTF
1330	14th	Matthew†, Mark† Luke†	192	Library of the Greek Orthodox Patriarchate, Sabas 200, fol. 1-192	Jerusalem		LOC, CSNTM
1331	14th	Gospels	229	Library of the Greek Orthodox Patriarchate, Sabas 201	Jerusalem		LOC, INTF, CSNTM
1332	11th	Matthew†	239	Library of the Greek Orthodox Patriarchate, Sabas 232	Jerusalem		LOC, INTF, CSNTM
1333	11th	Gospels	189	Library of the Greek Orthodox Patriarchate, Sabas 243	Jerusalem		LOC, INTF, CSNTM
1334	13th/14th	Gospels†	357	Library of the Greek Orthodox Patriarchate, Sabas 244	Jerusalem		LOC, CSNTM
1334	13th/14th	Gospels†	2	Russian National Library, GR. 300	Saint Petersburg	Russia	INTF
1335	12th/13th	Gospels†	192	Library of the Greek Orthodox Patriarchate, Sabas 248	Jerusalem		LOC, INTF, CSNTM
1336 + [2170]	1331-2	Theophylact Commentary on the Gospels	442	Library of the Greek Orthodox Patriarchate, Sabas 262	Jerusalem		LOC, CSNTM
1336 + [2170]	1331-2	Theophylact Commentary on the Gospels	8	Russian National Library, Gr. 407	Saint Petersburg	Russia	INTF
1337	13th	Theophylact Commentary on Gospel of Mark, Gospel of Luke	288	Library of the Greek Orthodox Patriarchate, Sabas 263	Jerusalem		LOC, INTF, CSNTM
1338 + [2154]	12th	Gospels†	220	Library of the Greek Orthodox Patriarchate, Sabas 357	Jerusalem		LOC, INTF, CSNTM
1338 + [2154]	12th	Gospels†	3	Russian National Library, Gr. 295	Saint Petersburg	Russia	INTF
1339	13th	Gospels	331	Library of the Greek Orthodox Patriarchate, Sabas 358	Jerusalem		LOC, CSNTM
1340	11th	Gospels	195	Library of the Greek Orthodox Patriarchate, Sabas 359	Jerusalem		LOC, INTF, CSNTM
1341	12th/13th	Gospels	189	Library of the Greek Orthodox Patriarchate, Sabas 410	Jerusalem		LOC, CSNTM
1342	13th/14th	Gospels	258	Library of the Greek Orthodox Patriarchate, Sabas 411	Jerusalem		LOC, INTF, CSNTM
1343	11th	Gospels †	385	Library of the Greek Orthodox Patriarchate, Sabas 412	Jerusalem		LOC, INTF, CSNTM
1344	12th	Gospels †	219	Library of the Greek Orthodox Patriarchate, Sabas 413	Jerusalem		INTF, CSNTM
1345	14th	Gospels	422	Library of the Greek Orthodox Patriarchate, Sabas 572	Jerusalem		LOC, CSNTM
1346 + [2150]	10th/11th	Gospels	169	Library of the Greek Orthodox Patriarchate, Sabas 606	Jerusalem		LOC, INTF, CSNTM
1346 + [2150]	10th/11th	Gospels	2	National Library of Russia, Gr. 285	Saint Petersburg	Russia	INTF
1347	10th	Gospels †	289	Library of the Greek Orthodox Patriarchate, Sabas 644	Jerusalem		LOC, INTF, CSNTM
1348 + [2169]	15th	Gospels†	389	Library of the Greek Orthodox Patriarchate, Sabas 645	Jerusalem		LOC, CSNTM
1348 + [2169]	15th	Gospels†	4	National Library of Russia, Gr. 400	Saint Petersburg	Russia	INTF
1349	11th	Gospels†	130	Library of the Greek Orthodox Patriarchate, Stavros 45	Jerusalem		LOC, INTF, CSNTM
1350	12th	Gospels	311	Library of the Greek Orthodox Patriarchate, Stavros 46	Jerusalem		LOC, INTF, CSNTM
1351	10th	Gospels†	183	Library of the Greek Orthodox Patriarchate, Stavros 74	Jerusalem		LOC, INTF, CSNTM
1352	13th	Gospels, Acts, General Epistles, Pauline Epistles	235	Library of the Greek Orthodox Patriarchate, Stavros 94	Jerusalem		LOC, INTF, CSNTM
1353	12th/13th	Gospels	254	Library of the Greek Orthodox Patriarchate, Stavros 95	Jerusalem		LOC, INTF, CSNTM
1354	14th	Gospels, Acts, General Epistles, Pauline Epistles	237	Library of the Greek Orthodox Patriarchate, Stavros 101	Jerusalem		LOC, INTF, CSNTM
1355	12th	Gospels	330	Library of the Greek Orthodox Patriarchate, Stavros 104	Jerusalem		LOC, INTF, CSNTM
1356	14th	Gospels	303	Walters Art Museum, Ms. W. 532	Baltimore, MD	United States	WAM
1356	14th	Gospels	303	Walters Art Museum, Ms. W. 532	Baltimore, MD	United States	INTF, CSNTM
1357	10th	Gospels	192	Princeton University, Scheide Library, Scheide Ms. 70	Princeton, NJ	United States	INTF
1357	10th	Gospels	192	Princeton University, Scheide Library, Scheide Ms. 70	Princeton, NJ	United States	SL
1358	11th/12th	Gospels	258	Church of the Holy Sepulchre, Skevophylakion, 15	Jerusalem		INTF
1359 = [2327]	12th	Gospels, Acts, General Epistles, Pauline Epistles	336	National Library, Supplement Grec 1335	Paris	France	BnF, CSNTM
1360	12th	Acts, General Epistles, Pauline epistles	321	National Library, 207	Athens	Greece	CSNTM
1360	12th	Acts, General Epistles, Pauline epistles	321	National Library, 207	Athens	Greece	CSNTM (28)
1360	12th	Acts, General Epistles, Pauline epistles	7	Odesa National Scientific Library, 555	Odesa	Ukraine	INTF
1361	1156	Gospels	342	Museum of the Bible, G.C.MS.000484	Washington, DC	United States	CSNTM
1362	1539	Gospels	213	Zoodochos Pigi Monastery (Hagias), 53	Andros	Greece	INTF
1363	14th	Gospels	226	Zoodochos Pigi Monastery (Hagias), 56	Andros	Greece	INTF
1364	12th	Gospels	348	Library of the Greek Orthodox Patriarchate, Nea Syllogi (Photiu), 23	Jerusalem		LOC, INTF, CSNTM
1365	12th	Gospels	226	Library of the Greek Orthodox Patriarchate, Nea Syllogi (Photiu), 28	Jerusalem		LOC, INTF, CSNTM
1366	13th	Luke, John	127	Vatican Library, Ross.211	Vatican City	Vatican City	INTF
1367	15th	Gospels, Acts, General Epistles, Pauline Epistles	133	National Library, 1882	Athens	Greece	CSNTM
[1368] = 807							
[1369] = 2097							
1370	1542	John	295	Berlin State Library, Phil. 1420	Berlin	Germany	INTF
1371	16th/17th	Gospels, Pauline epistles	68	Berlin State Library, Phil. 1422	Berlin	Germany	INTF
1372	13th	Gospels†	278	National Library, Taphu 369	Athens	Greece	INTF
1373	11th	Gospels†	260	Turkish Historical Society, 26	Ankara	Turkey	INTF
1374	16th	Theophylact Commentary on Matthew, Mark	239	Berlin State Library, Phill. 1465	Berlin	Germany	INTF
1375	12th	Gospels	239	Russian State Library, F. 304/W.28 (Gr. 11)	Moscow	Russia	INTF
[1376]=1521							
1377	14th	Gospels	288	Ecclesiastical Byzantine Museum of Mytilene	Mytilene, Lesbos	Greece	EBMM
1377	14th	Gospels	288	Ecclesiastical Byzantine Museum of Mytilene	Mytilene, Lesbos	Greece	INTF
[1378]	10th	Gospels	349	Burnt? Formerly Lesbos, Mytilini, Symeon			
1379	10th	Gospels†	193	High School, 41	Mytilene, Lesbos	Greece	
1380	13th	Gospel of John^{P}	7	Jagiellonian Library, Graec. Qu. 68, fol. 1-7	Kraków	Poland	
1381	16th	Gospel of Matthew, John	286	Owner unknown, formerly: St. Nicholas Monastery, 2	Andros	Greece	
1382	14th	Gospels, Acts, General Epistles, Pauline Epistles	527	St. Nicholas Monastery, 26	Andros	Greece	
1383	15th	Gospels	250	Panachrantos Monastery, 11	Andros	Greece	INTF
1384	11th	New Testament†	296	Panachrantos Monastery, 13	Andros	Greece	INTF
1385	12th	Gospels	304	Monastery of Saint John the Theologian, 274	Patmos	Greece	INTF
1386	12th	Matthew, Mark, Luke, John 1:1-18:27†	241	Monastery of Saint John the Theologian, 276	Patmos	Greece	CSNTM
1386	12th	Matthew, Mark, Luke, John 1:1-18:27†	241	Monastery of Saint John the Theologian, 276	Patmos	Greece	INTF
1387	15th/16th	Theophylact Commentary on the Gospels†	378	Monastery of Saint John the Theologian, 360	Patmos	Greece	INTF
1388	15th	Gospels	167	Monastery of Saint John the Theologian, 698	Patmos	Greece	INTF
1389	15th	Gospels	254	Monastery of Saint John the Theologian, 699	Patmos	Greece	INTF
1390	14th	Gospels, Acts, General Epistles, Pauline Epistles	294	Stavronikita Monastery, 45	Mount Athos	Greece	MAR
1391	13th	Gospels	251	Pantokratoros Monastery, 34	Mount Athos	Greece	INTF
1392	10th	Gospels	328	Pantokratoros Monastery, 39	Mount Athos	Greece	INTF, CSNTM
1393	12th	Gospels	88	Pantokratoros Monastery, 45	Mount Athos	Greece	INTF, CSNTM
1394	1301	Gospels	345	Pantokratoros Monastery, 47	Mount Athos	Greece	INTF, CSNTM
1395	1366	Gospels	374	Borowski Collection (formerly Pantokratoros Monastery, 48)	Toronto	Canada	INTF, CSNTM
1396	14th	Gospels	271	Pantokratoros Monastery, 51	Mount Athos	Greece	INTF
1397	14th	Gospels	284	Pantokratoros Monastery, 52	Mount Athos	Greece	INTF
1397	14th	Gospels	2	Princeton University, y1956-118	Princeton, NJ	United States	PUAM
1398	13th	Gospels†, Acts†, General Epistles†, Pauline Epistles†	276	Pantokratoros Monastery, 56	Mount Athos	Greece	INTF
1399	13th	Gospels†	158	Pantokratoros Monastery, 57	Mount Athos	Greece	INTF
1400	13th	Gospels, Acts, General Epistles, Pauline Epistles	374	Pantokratoros Monastery, 58	Mount Athos	Greece	INTF

[top]

== See also ==
- List of New Testament papyri
- List of New Testament uncials
- List of New Testament minuscules (1–1000)
- List of New Testament minuscules (1001–2000)
- List of New Testament minuscules (2001–)
- List of New Testament minuscules ordered by Location/Institution
- List of New Testament lectionaries

== Bibliography ==
- Aland, Kurt; M. Welte; B. Köster; K. Junack (1994). Kurzgefasste Liste der griechischen Handschriften des Neues Testaments. Berlin, New York: Walter de Gruyter. p. 95. ISBN 3-11-011986-2.
- "Liste Handschriften". Münster: Institute for New Testament Textual Research.
