= MS 13 =

MS 13 or MS-13 may refer to:

- Mara Salvatrucha (MS-13), a criminal street gang in North, Central, and South America
- Mississippi Highway 13, a state highway in Mississippi, United States
- Minuscule 13, a Greek minuscule manuscript of the New Testament
- Soyuz MS-13, a Soyuz spaceflight launched on 20 July 2019 to the International Space Station
