= Scéla Conchobair =

12th century Irish text

Scéla Conchobair maic Nessa (Scéla Conchobuir meic Nessa) or the Tidings of Conchobar mac Nessa is a title invented by Whitley Stokes for a short prose piece from the Ulster Cycle preserved in the 12th-century manuscript, the Book of Leinster. It is interpolated with lore not found elsewhere regarding the branches (halls) of the Ulster court at Emain Macha and the shields of the Ulstermen.

== Description ==
In the codex (Book of Leinster, TCD 1339 olim H.2.18), the piece is bound in leaves immediately following the recension of the Táin Bó Cúailnge, and in the Catalogue is listed among the "Prose tales of Conchobar Mac Nessa, Cuchulaind, Athirne, Celtchair.".

The beginning portion recapitulates the conception of Conchobair, and for this reason, the tale has also been referred to as a variant text of the Compert Conchobair
Others class the tale as a variant of the tract on "How Conchobar obtained the Kingship of Ulster."

In this tale is a description of the three halls, or branches of Conchobar. Croebrúad (Stokes: the Cróeb-ruad, O'Curry: the Royal Branch, Kinsella: Craebruad, the Red Branch), Téite Brecc (Stokes: the Téite Brecc, O'Curry: Speckled Branch, Kinsella: Téte Brec, the Twinkling Hoard ), Croibderg (Stokes: the Red Branch, O'Curry: the Red Branch, Kinsella: Craebderg, the Ruddy Branch). The first being the palace hall of the Ulstermen. The second was the armoury where the shields, weapons, and goblets were kept. The third stored all the heads and spoils.

There follows a listing of the shields of the Ulstermen, eighteen in all, beginning with the Ochain of Conchobar. Some of the personages are difficult to identify since neither patronymics nor nicknames are given alongside the names. This portion was also treated by O'Curry in his lectures. Some of the shields are construed to be swords by contemporary translators and dictionarists

The lore regarding the great ale/wine vat, Ol n-guala, and the rod with apples/balls for calling the crowd to attention, can be compared with the accounts found in the LU recension of Tochmarc Emer.

This work has also been incorporated as one of the foretales in Kinsella's translation of The Táin. This editorial decision is potentially confusing, since for the Tain Bo Cuailnge proper, he uses the first recension and not the Book of Leinster version.

The work also contains interesting passage of hyperboles regarding the heptad of Fergus (Irish: sechtae), omitted by Kinsella, which states how Fergus had the appetite of seven men, a libido that could only be satisfied by seven women in the absence of his wife Flidas, and that the size of his phallus measured seven fists. On the last reference, it may be borne in mind that the upright stone on Tara Hill, by some considered the Lia Fail, was "still popularly called Bod Fhearghais, that is, Penis Fergusii" in the days of antiquarian George Petrie,

== Manuscript sources ==
(Tidings/Story of Conchobar)

- Book of Leinster (LL): p 106a 1 -107b 21 (RIA).

(How Conchobar obtained the kingship)

- Book of Ballymote (BB): f 167Va-b (fragment)
- Book of Lismore: p 247a-248a (f 125b 1) (fragment)

== Editions and translations ==
(Tidings/Story of Conchobar)[LL]

- Stokes, Whitley (1910b), "Scéla Conchobair maic Nessa: The Tidings of Conchobar son of Ness" (google), Ériu, 4: 18–38
- O'Curry, Eugene (1873), "Lect. XV, List of celebrated Shields, in the Book of Leinster", On the Manners and Customs of the Ancient Irish, vol. 2, pp. 332–3, ISBN 9780876960103
- Kinsella, Thomas (1969), "Chapter: How Conchobar was Begotten, and How he took the Kingship of Ulster", The Táin, Oxford: Oxford University Press, pp. 3–8, ISBN 978-0-19-280373-3

(How Conchobar obtained the kingship)

- Stokes, Whitley (1910a), "How Conchobar mac Nessa got the Kingship of the Ulaid when he was seven years old" (Internet Archive), Lives of saints, from the Book of Lismore, Oxford: Clarendon Press, pp. xxxiv–xxxv
- Vernam Hull (1956), "How Conchobar Gained the Kingship of Ulster", Zeitschrift für celtische Philologie, 25: 243–5 [short text from BB].

== Secondary literature ==
- Kuno Meyer (1884), "Anecdota from the Stowe Ms. N 992" (google), Revue Celtique, 6: 173–86 (Coimpert Concobuir in so / The Conception of Conchobur, pp. 173–82)
- Abbott, Thomas Kingsmill (1900), Catalogue of the manuscripts in the Library of Trinity College, Dublin (google), Dublin: Hodges, Figgis & Co., p. 361
  - Abbott, Thomas Kingsmill; Gwynn, E. J. (1921), Catalogue of the manuscripts in the Library of Trinity College, Dublin (Internet Archive), Dublin: Hodges, Figgis & Co., p. 159
- Petrie, George (1839), "[Memoir] on the History and Antiquities of Tara Hill" (Internet Archive), Transactions of the Royal Irish Academy: 25–232 The paper was "read 24th April, etc..., 1837". The particular mention regarding Fergus's stone occurs on p. 159.
