= Minuscule 106 =

- New Testament manuscript
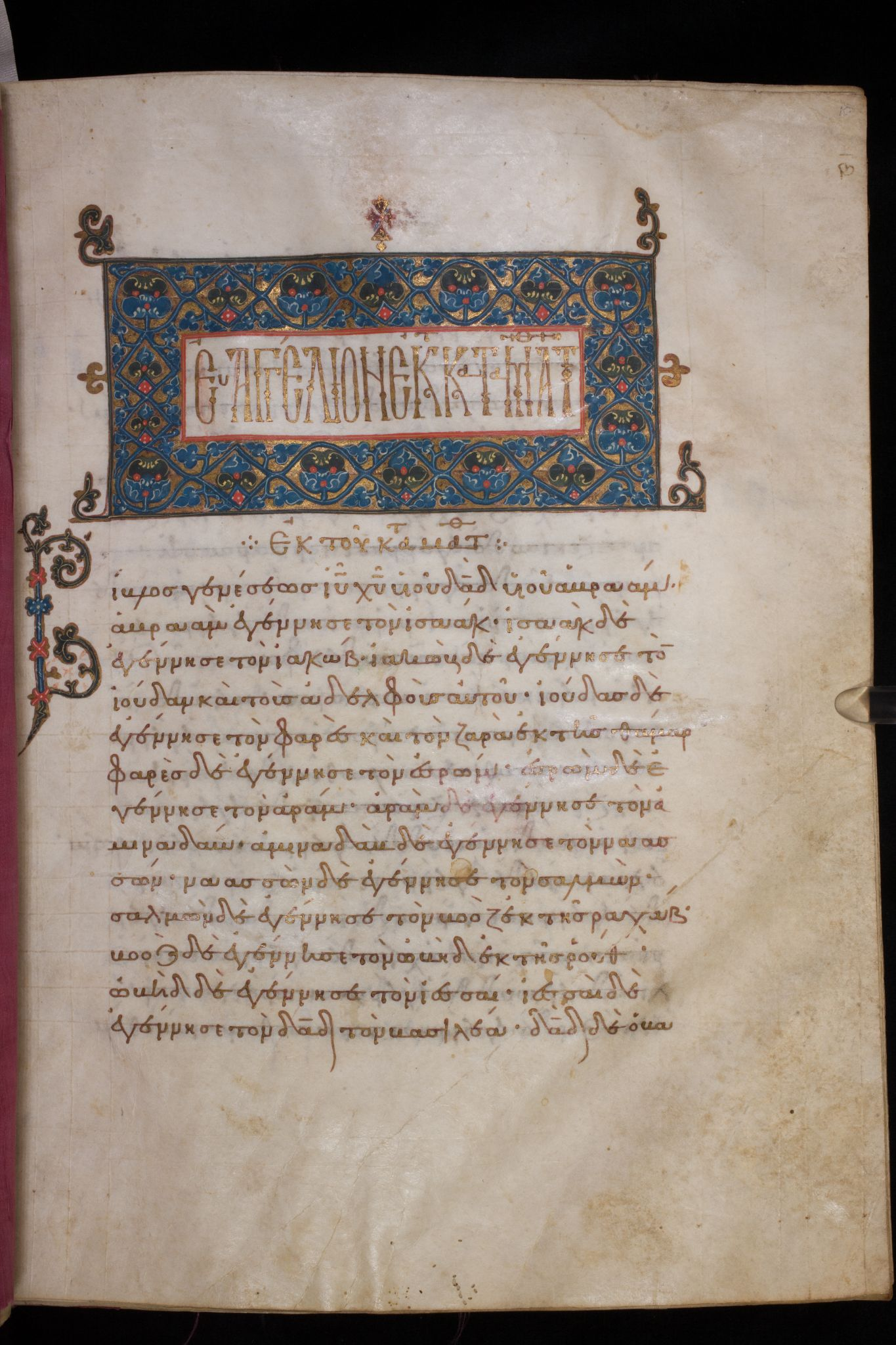
- Name: Codex Winchelsea
- Text: Gospels
- Date: 10th century
- Script: Greek
- Now at: Chester Beatty Library
- Size: 27 cm by 20.5 cm
- Type: Byzantine text-type/mixed
- Category: none
- Note: close to Syriac Philoxenian

Minuscule 106 (in the Gregory-Aland numbering), ε 1380 (Soden), is a Greek minuscule manuscript of the New Testament, on parchment leaves. Palaeographically it has been assigned to the 10th century.

== Description ==
The codex contains a complete text of the four Gospels on 212 parchment leaves 27 cm by 20.5 cm. The text is written in one column per page, in 22 lines per page.

The Greek text of the codex Kurt Aland did not place in any Category. According to the Claremont Profile Method it belongs to the textual group M106 in Luke 1, Luke 10, and Luke 20.

It contains many readings close to Syriac Philoxenian.

It has unique reading in Matthew 27:62.

In John 7:40 it lacks the phrase των λογων τουτων; the reading is supported only by Lectionary 44 and Syriac Sinaitic.

== History ==
Griesbach dated the manuscript to the 10th century.

The manuscript once belonged to César de Missy.

Jackson collated the text of the manuscript for Wettstein in 1748. It was examined by Griesbach and wrongly classified by him as a representative of the Alexandrian text-type.

According to Scrivener it was held in the Earl of Winchelsea's Library, but in 1883 Earl of Winchelsea wrote to Gregory that he did not have any Gospel manuscripts.

Currently the manuscript is housed in the Chester Beatty Library (Ms. W 135), in Dublin.

== See also ==
- List of New Testament minuscules
- Biblical manuscript
- Textual criticism
