= Minuscule 983 =

- New Testament manuscript
- Text: Gospels
- Date: 12th century
- Script: Greek
- Now at: Esphigmenou Monastery
- Size: 21.5 cm by 15.5 cm
- Type: Caesarean text-type
- Category: III
- Note: ƒ^{13}

Minuscule 983 (in the Gregory-Aland numbering of New Testament manuscripts), ε3017 (in the von Soden numbering of New Testament manuscripts), is a 12th-century Greek minuscule manuscript of the New Testament on parchment. It is missing John 11:33-19:9. The manuscript is part of a group of New Testament manuscripts known as Family 13 (ƒ^{13}).

Despite its current location being known, access to see the manuscript to take new colour images of its pages has been hampered due to an ongoing dispute between the monastery where it is housed, and the Greek government.

== Description ==
The manuscript is a codex (precursor to the modern book), containing the text of the four Gospels, on 208 parchment leaves (sized 21.5 cm by 15.5 cm). The text is written in two columns per page, 25 lines per page. The manuscript is generally complete, except for a large gap (John 11:33-19:9).

Large initial letters begin each Gospel, and smaller ones mark out the paragraphs. Lectionary (weekly church reading portions) beginning (αρψη / arche) and ending (τελος / telos) marks appear throughout, as well as the Eusebian canon numbers (an early systems of dividing the four Gospels into different sections). The three common Greek accents (used to indicate voiced pitch changes) are employed, and breathing marks (utilised to designate vowel emphasis) are abundant.

The chapters (known as κεφαλαια / kephalaia) are written in the upper margins above each column, though sometimes in the bottom margin too.

Subscriptions are written at the end of the Gospels of Matthew, Mark, and Luke, along with the number of lines (known as στιχοι / stichoi), and phrases (known as ρηματα / rhemata). There is no subscription at the end of the Gospel of John, but instead commences with the synaxarion.

== Text ==
The Greek text of the codex has been considered as a representative of the Caesarean text-type. The text-types are groups of different New Testament manuscripts which share specific or generally related readings, which then differ from each other group, and thus the conflicting readings can separate out the groups. These are then used to determine the original text as published; there are three main groups with names: Alexandrian, Western, and Byzantine. The Caesarean text-type however (initially identified by biblical scholar Burnett Hillman Streeter) has been contested by several text-critics, such as Kurt and Barbara Aland. Hermann von Soden classified it to the textual family I^{ια}.

According to Kurt and Barbara Aland, it supports the Byzantine text against the "original" 157 times, original against the Byzantine 76 times, and 29 times it agrees with both. It has also 62 independent or distinctive readings. Kurt Aland placed it in Category III of his New Testament manuscript classification system. Category III manuscripts are described as having "a small but not a negligible proportion of early readings, with a considerable encroachment of [Byzantine] readings, and significant readings from other sources as yet unidentified."

According to the Claremont Profile Method, it represents textual family ƒ^{13} (the Ferrar Family) in Luke 1, Luke 10, and Luke 20.

== History ==
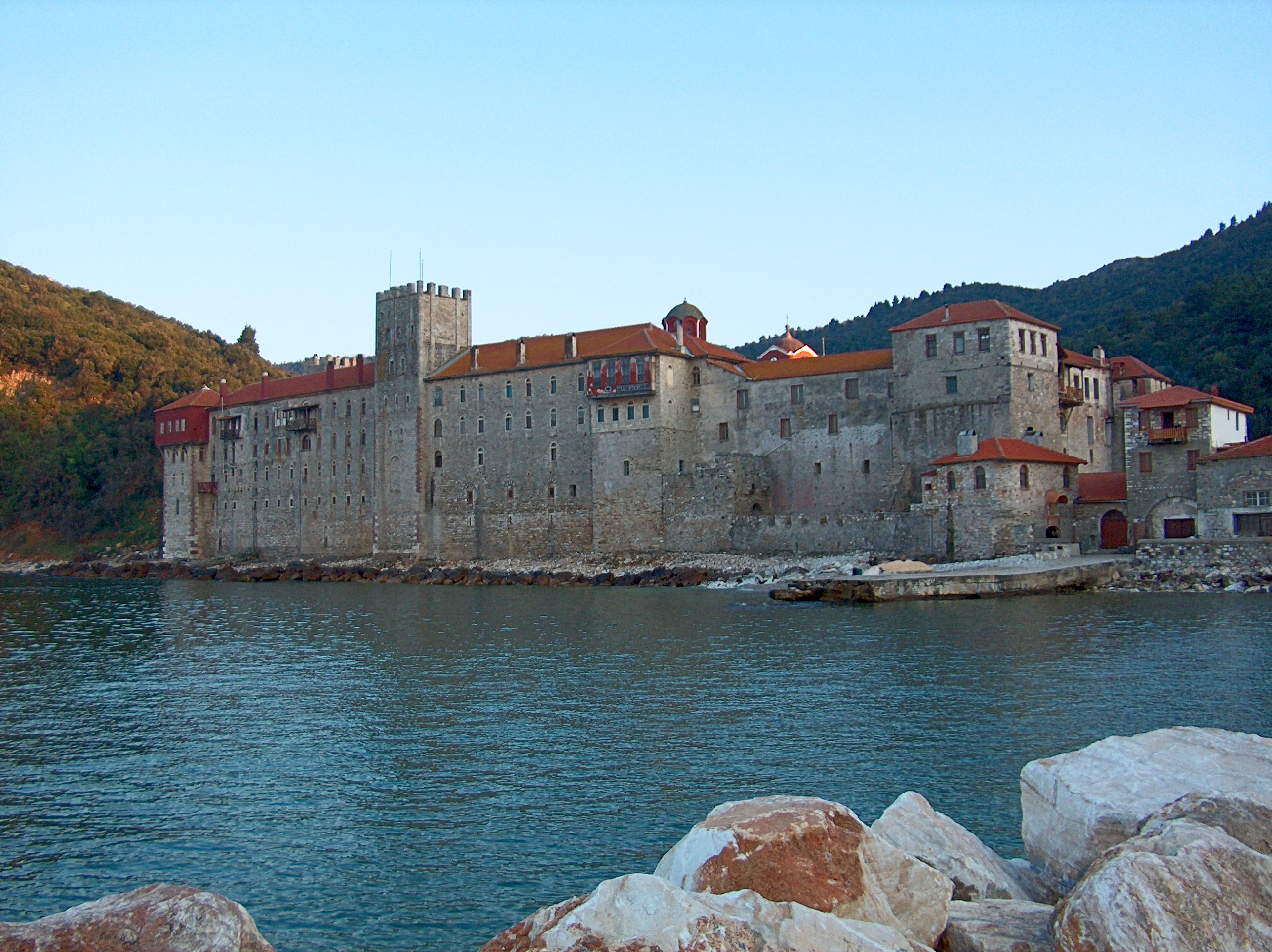
The Esphigmenou monastery, where Minuscule 983 is currently housed and largely inaccessible

Textual critic Caspar René Gregory dated the manuscript to the 12th century. The manuscript is currently dated by the INTF to the 12th century.

The manuscript is currently housed at the Esphigmenou Monastery (shelf mark 29), on Mount Athos in Greece.

Due to long-standing issues between the Esphigmenou Monastery and the Greek Government, government troops have been stationed there since 2005, which has prevented anyone from personally seeing the codex, with only black and white microfilm images of it available to consult.

== See also ==
- List of New Testament minuscules
- Biblical manuscript
- Textual criticism
