= Minuscule 268 =

- New Testament manuscript
- Text: Gospels
- Date: 12th century
- Script: Greek
- Now at: National Library of France
- Size: 24.7 cm by 19.5 cm
- Type: Byzantine text-type
- Category: V
- Note: marginalia

Minuscule 268 (in the Gregory-Aland numbering), ε 1163 (Soden), is a Greek minuscule manuscript of the New Testament, on parchment. Paleographically it has been assigned to the 12th century. It has marginalia.

== Description ==
The codex contains the text of the four Gospels on 396 parchment leaves (24.7 cm by 19.5 cm). The text is written in two columns per page, in 25 lines per page.

The text is divided according to numbers of the κεφαλαια (chapters), whose numbers are given at the margin, and their τιτλοι (titles of chapters) at the top of the pages. There is also a division according to the smaller Ammonian Sections (Matthew 356, Mark 234 – the last section in 16:9, Luke 342, John 232), with references to the Eusebian Canons (written below Ammonian Section numbers).

It contains the Epistula ad Carpianum, Eusebian Canon tables, tables of the κεφαλαια (tables of contents) before each Gospel, lectionary markings at the margin (for liturgical use), synaxaria, and Menologion. Incipits and pictures were added by a later hand.

== Text ==
The Greek text of the codex is a representative of the Byzantine text-type. Aland placed it in Category V.

According to the Claremont Profile Method it represent the textual family Π268 in Luke 1 and Luke 20. In Luke 20 no profile was made. It creates textual pair with Minuscule 787.

== History ==
The manuscripts was added to the list of New Testament manuscripts by Scholz (1794-1852). It was examined and described by Paulin Martin. C. R. Gregory saw the manuscript in 1885.

The manuscript is currently housed at the Bibliothèque nationale de France (Gr. 73) at Paris.

== See also ==
- List of New Testament minuscules
- Biblical manuscript
- Textual criticism
