= Minuscule 788 =

- New Testament manuscript
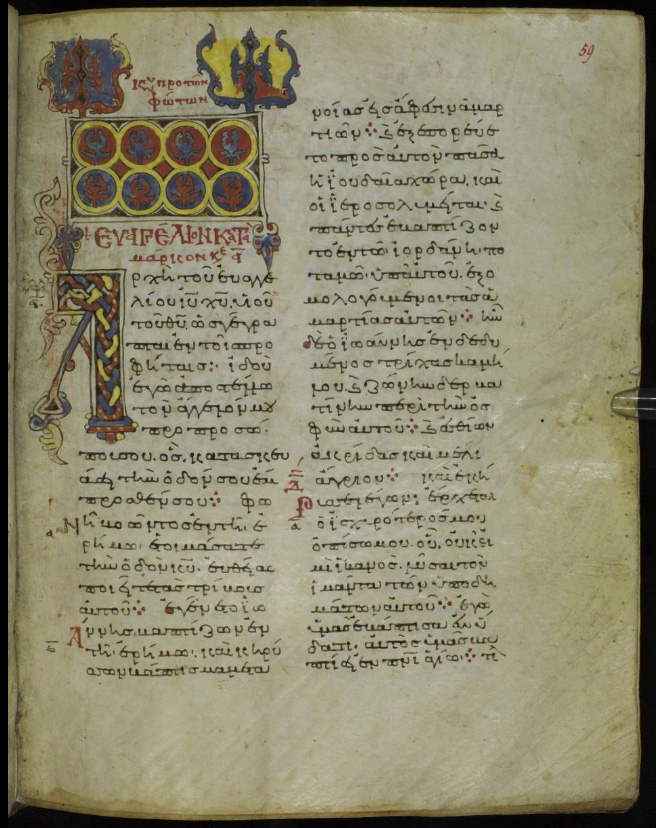
- GA 788, showing the opening verses to the Gospel of Mark
- Text: Gospels
- Date: 11th century
- Script: Greek
- Now at: National Library of Greece
- Size: 22 cm by 17 cm
- Type: Caesarean text-type
- Category: III
- Note: ƒ^{13}

Minuscule 788 is a Greek minuscule manuscript of the New Testament written on parchment. It is designated by the siglum 788 in the Gregory-Aland numbering of New Testament manuscripts, and ε1033 in the von Soden numbering of New Testament manuscripts Using the study of comparative handwriting styles (palaeography), it has been assigned to the 11th century.

It is one of the manuscripts comprising the group known as Family 13 (ƒ^{13}). According to scholar Didier Lafleur it is the closest manuscript in its textual character to the archetype of the family.

== Description ==
The manuscript is a codex (precursor to the modern book), containing the text of the four Gospels on 219 parchment leaves (sized 22 cm by 17 cm),, with only one gap (John 21:20-25). The text is written in two columns per page, 26 lines per page.

The text is divided according to the chapters (known as κεφαλαια / kephalaia), whose numbers are given in the margin, with their chapter titles (known as τιτλοι / titloi) at the top of the pages. There is also another division according to the smaller Ammonian Sections (in Mark there are 234 sections, ending at 16:9), with references to the Eusebian Canons (an early system of dividing the four Gospels into different sections). There is also a Gospel Harmony included at the bottom of the pages in the Gospel of John.

It contains the Epistle to Carpian (a letter from the early church writer Eusebius of Caesarea, outlying his gospel harmony system, his chapter divisions of the four gospels, and their purpose), tables of contents (also known as κεφαλαια / kephalaia) before each Gospel, Prolegomena (introductions) to the four Gospels, lectionary markings (to indicate what verse was to be read on a specific day in the church's yearly calendar) in the margin, liturgical books with hagiographies, a Synaxarion (a list of saint's days), and Menologion (a list of readings to be read each calendar month), subscriptions at the end of each of the Gospels, and pictures. The manuscript also includes lists of how many phrases (known as ρηματα / rhemata) are used in each gospel, and how many lines (known as στιχοι / stichoi) are written in each gospel, but after the end of each Gospel's table of contents, as opposed to the usual location after the end of each Gospel's text.

== Text ==
The Greek text of the codex has been considered as a representative of the Caesarean text-type. The text-types are groups of different New Testament manuscripts which share specific or generally related readings, which then differ from each other group, and thus the conflicting readings can separate out the groups. These are then used to determine the original text as published; there are three main groups with names: Alexandrian, Western, and Byzantine. The Caesarean text-type however (initially identified by biblical scholar Burnett Hillman Streeter) has been contested by several text-critics, such as Kurt and Barbara Aland. Textual critic Hermann von Soden classified it within his textual family I^{ιb}. Kurt Aland placed it in Category III of his New Testament manuscript classification system. Category III manuscripts are described as having "a small but not a negligible proportion of early readings, with a considerable encroachment of [Byzantine] readings, and significant readings from other sources as yet unidentified."

According to the Claremont Profile Method (a specific analysis of textual data), it represents the textual family ƒ^{13} in Luke 1, Luke 10, and Luke 20 as a core member.

It lacks the text of Matthew 16:2b–3. The text of Luke 22:43-44 is placed after Matthew 26:39, and the text of the Pericope Adulterae is placed after Luke 21:38.

Scholar Didier Lafleur claims that the Greek text of minuscule 788 is the closest to the archetype (the originating manuscript from which all others are descended) of Family 13, publishing a new transcription and collation of the family 13 manuscripts in Mark in 2013.

== History ==
According to biblical scholar Caspar René Gregory, the manuscript was written in the 11th century, a dating adopted by the Institute for New Testament Textual Research. It was written in Calabria for a man named Leo and was added to the list of New Testament manuscripts by Gregory, who saw the manuscript in 1886.

It was formerly housed in the monastery Porta Panagia 26. The monastery is said to have been raided in 1823 by the Albanian Soultza Korutz, who after killing most of the monks took its treasures and burnt the library there, however there is a distinct lack of evidence about this supposed raid. Whatever the reason the manuscript left the monastery, it and several others were deposited in the National Library of Greece in Athens. In 1876, the manuscript was noticed as being mentioned in a catalogue of the manuscripts which were originally located at Porta Panagia. The manuscript is now housed at the National Library of Greece (74).

== See also ==
- List of New Testament minuscules
- Biblical manuscript
- Textual criticism
- Minuscule 787
