= Lectionary 44 =

Lectionary ℓ 44
- New Testament manuscript
- Name: Havniensis 3
- Text: Apostolos
- Date: 12th-century
- Script: Greek
- Now at: Det Kongelige Bibliotek
- Size: 26.6 cm by 19.1 cm

Lectionary 44, designated by siglum ℓ 44 (in the Gregory-Aland numbering). It is a Greek manuscript of the New Testament, on parchment leaves. Palaeographically it has been assigned to the 12th-century.

== Description ==
The codex contains lessons from the Acts of the Apostles and Catholic epistles lectionary (Apostolos), on 195 parchment leaves (26.6 cm by 19.1 cm), with some lacunae. The text is written in two columns per page, 24-26 lines per page, in Greek uncial letters. Some parts were added by two later hands. Added 81-123 leaves are written in one column per page, 30-32 lines per page.

In Mark 9:41 in margin note it has textual variant επι τω ονοματι μου supported by the manuscripts of the f^{13} 1344, and syr^{pal} instead of εν ονοματι (Alexandrian mss), εν τω ονοματι μου (D Δ and Caesarean manuscripts) or εν ονοματι μου (Byzantine mss).

In John 7:40 it lacks phrase των λογων τουτων, the reading is supported only by minuscule 106 and Syriac Sinaitic.

== History ==
The manuscript was bought by Frederic Rostgaard. It was examined and described by C. G. Hensler and Birch.

The manuscript is sporadically cited in the critical editions of the Greek New Testament (UBS3).

Currently the codex is located in the Det Kongelige Bibliotek (GKS 1324, 4°) in Copenhagen.

== See also ==
- List of New Testament lectionaries
- Biblical manuscript
- Textual criticism
