= Minuscule 1346 =

Minuscule 346
- New Testament manuscript
- Text: Gospels
- Date: 10th/11th century
- Script: Greek
- Now at: Patriarchate of Jerusalem
- Type: Caesarean text-type, possibly mixed with Byzantine text-type (Gospels)

Minuscule 346 (in the Gregory-Aland numbering), is a Greek minuscule manuscript of the New Testament. The manuscript palaeographically has been assigned to the 10th or 11th century. It is a member of Ferrar Group.

== Text ==
In Luke 11:4 it reads καὶ μὴ εἰσενέγκῃς ἡμᾶς εἰς πειρασμοί (with "temptations" in the plural), rather than καὶ μὴ εἰσενέγκῃς ἡμᾶς εἰς πειρασμόν (with "temptation" in the singular).

== History ==
Prior to the publication of Reuben Swanson's series "New Testament Greek Manuscripts", Swanson identified minuscule 1346 to be a member of Family 13. This manuscript is not enumerated in index of Novum Testamentum Graece.

== Bibliography ==
- Reuben Swanson, , Title: New Testament Greek Manuscripts - Luke, Publisher: William Carey Int'l Univ Press (August 1, 1998), ISBN 0865850534, ISBN 978-0865850538, pp. ix.
