= Minuscule 787 =

- New Testament manuscript
- Text: Gospels
- Date: 12th century
- Script: Greek
- Now at: National Library of Greece
- Size: 18.5 cm by 13 cm
- Type: Byzantine text-type
- Category: V
- Note: –

Minuscule 787 (in the Gregory-Aland numbering), ε471 (von Soden), is a Greek minuscule manuscript of the New Testament written on parchment. Palaeographically it has been assigned to the 12th century. The manuscript has complex contents.

== Description ==
The codex contains the text of the four Gospels, on 305 parchment leaves (size 18.5 cm by 13 cm).

The text is written in one column per page, 24 lines per page.

The text is divided according to the κεφαλαια (chapters), whose numbers are given at the margin, with their τιτλοι (titles) at the top of the pages. There is also another division according to the smaller Ammonian Sections, but without references to the Eusebian Canons.

It contains tables of the κεφαλαια and subscriptions. Lectionary markings at the margin, incipits, αναγνωσεις (lessons), liturgical books with hagiographies, Synaxarion and Menologion were added by a later hand.

== Text ==
The Greek text of the codex is a representative of the Byzantine text-type. Hermann von Soden classified it to the textual family I^{κ}. Aland placed it in Category V.

According to the Claremont Profile Method it represent the textual family Π268 in Luke 1 and Luke 20. In Luke 20 no profile was made. It creates textual pair with minuscule 268.

== History ==
According to Gregory the manuscript was written in the 12th century. The manuscript is currently dated by the INTF to the 12th century.

Formerly it was housed in the monastery μεγαλων πυλων 23. The manuscript was noticed in catalogue from 1876.

It was added to the list of New Testament manuscripts by Gregory (787). Gregory saw the manuscript in 1886.

The manuscript is now housed at the National Library of Greece (108) in Athens.

== See also ==
- List of New Testament minuscules
- Biblical manuscript
- Textual criticism
- Minuscule 786
