= Minuscule 13 =

Greek minuscule manuscript of the New Testament

- New Testament manuscript
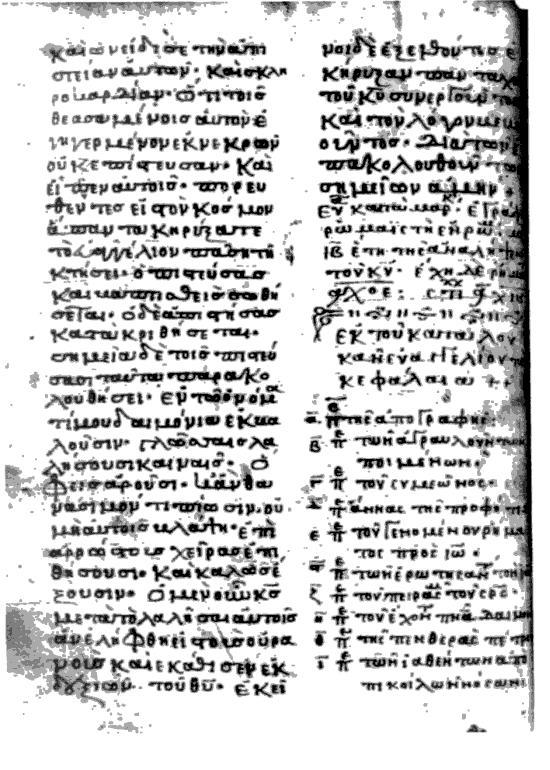
- Ending of Mark
- Text: Gospels
- Date: 13th century
- Script: Greek
- Now at: National Library of France
- Size: 23.9 cm by 18.2 cm
- Type: Caesarean text-type
- Category: III
- Note: marginalia

Minuscule 13 is a Greek minuscule manuscript of the New Testament, containing the four Gospels. It is designated by the siglum 13 in the Gregory-Aland numbering of New Testament manuscripts, and ε 368 in the von Soden numbering of New Testament manuscripts. Using the study of comparative writing styles (palaeography), it has been dated to the 13th century. The manuscript has some missing pages. The text of the manuscript is important for New Testament textual criticism. It has several marginalia (notes in the margins), and was adapted for liturgical use.

== Description ==
The manuscript is a codex (forerunner to the modern book format), containing the text of the four Gospels on 170 parchment leaves (23.9 cm by 18.2 cm), with some gaps (missing Matt 1:1-2:20; 26:33-52; 27:26-28:9; Mark 1:20-45; John 16:19-17:11; 21:2-25). The text is written in two columns per page, 28-30 lines per page, in minuscule letters. The binder incorrectly placed the pages containing Luke 9:19–50 after Mark 10:18, and those containing Luke 1:5–25 after Luke 10:22. According to biblical scholar and textual critic Frederick H. A. Scrivener "it is not correctly written".

The text is divided according to the 'chapters' (κεφαλαια / kephalaia), whose numbers are given at the margin, and their titles (τιτλοι / titloi) at the top of the pages. There is also another division according to the smaller Ammonian Sections (in Mark 234 sections, the last in 16:9). It has no references to the Eusebian Canons (both early divisions of the Gospels into referenceable sections).

According to classicist William Hugh Ferrar, it has 1523 errors of itacisms and another errors, but not more than in other manuscripts of that time. The letter omicron (ο) is frequently written for the letter omega (ω); the diphthong ου is once written for upsilon (υ) (in Matthew 25:9). The copyist has sometimes omitted words due to carelessness, with even parts of words omitted (ηδυ for ηδυνηθη) Nu-moveable is usually included, however in four places it is omitted causing hiatus.

The manuscript contains the nomina sacra (special names/words considered sacred in Christianity - usually the first and last letters of the name/word in question are written, followed by an overline; sometimes other letters from within the word are used as well), which are employed throughout (the following list is for nominative case (subject) forms): ι̅ς̅ (Ιησους / Jesus); κ̅ς̅ (κυριος / Lord); χ̅ς̅ (χριστος / Christ; once for χρηστος / useful); δ̅α̅δ̅ (Δαυιδ / David); ι̅η̅λ̅ (Ισραηλ / Israel); ι̅λ̅η̅μ̅ (Ιερουσαλημ / Jerusalem); ο̅υ̅ν̅ο̅ς̅ (ουρανος / heaven); α̅ν̅ο̅ς̅ (ανθρωπος / man); σ̅η̅ρ̅ (σωτηρ / saviour); π̅η̅ρ̅ (πατηρ / father); μ̅η̅ρ̅ (μητηρ / mother); π̅ν̅α̅ (πνευμα / spirit); σ̅τ̅ρ̅ο̅ς̅ (σταυρος / cross).

It contains tables of the chapters before each Gospel, lectionary markings in the margin for liturgical use, Synaxarion (list of Saint's Days), Menologion (weekly readings for the Church's yearly calendar), and subscriptions at the end of each Gospel. Numbers of phrases (ρηματα / rhemata) are given in the subscriptions, and numbers of lines (στιχοι / stichoi). The subscription to Matthew states that Matthew was written in Hebrew eight years after our Lord's Ascension, and contained 2522 ρηματα and 2560 στιχοι; the subscription to Mark states Mark was written in Latin ten years after the Ascension with 1675 ρηματα and 1604 στιχοι; the subscription to Luke states Luke was written in Greek fifteen years after the Ascension with 3803 ρηματα and 2750 stichoi; and the subscription to John states John was written thirty two years after the Ascension with 1838 ρηματα.

The text of Pericope Adulterae (John 7:53–8:11) follows after Luke 21:38. The text of Matthew 16:2b–3 (signs of the times) is omitted. Luke 22:43-44 (Christ's agony at Gethsemane) is placed after Matthew 26:39.

== Text ==
The Greek text of the codex is considered to be a representative of the Caesarean text-type. The text-types are groups of different manuscripts which share specific or generally related readings, which then differ from each other group, and thus the conflicting readings can separate out the groups, which are then used to determine the original text as published; there are three main groups with names: Alexandrian, Western, and Byzantine. It belongs to the textual family known as family 13, or Ferrar group. This textual relationship to Family 13 was confirmed by the Claremont Profile Method (a specific analysis method of textual data). The manuscripts of the Ferrar group were derived from an uncial ancestor once located in southern Italy (Calabria) or Sicily in the 7th century.

According to New Testament scholars Kurt and Barbara Aland, it contains readings which agree with the Byzantine text 150 times as opposed to the reconstructed text of the original New Testament, readings with original against the Byzantine 31 times, and readings which agree with both 71 times. It also has 54 independent or distinctive readings. Kurt Aland placed the text of the codex in Category III of his New Testament manuscript text classification system. Category III manuscripts are described as having "a small but not a negligible proportion of early readings, with a considerable encroachment of [Byzantine] readings, and significant readings from other sources as yet unidentified."

In Matthew 1:16 it reads ω μνηστευθεισα παρθενος, Μαριαμ εγεννησεν Ιησουν τον λεγομενον Χριστον (to whom was betrothed a virgin, Mary, begat Jesus, the one called Messiah), as also witnessed by Codex Koridethi (Θ), the Curetonian Syriac, and the rest of the manuscripts of Family 13. In John 12:5 it reads διακοσιων (two hundred) for τριακοσιων (three hundred) along with other manuscripts of family 13 and family 1424.

== History ==
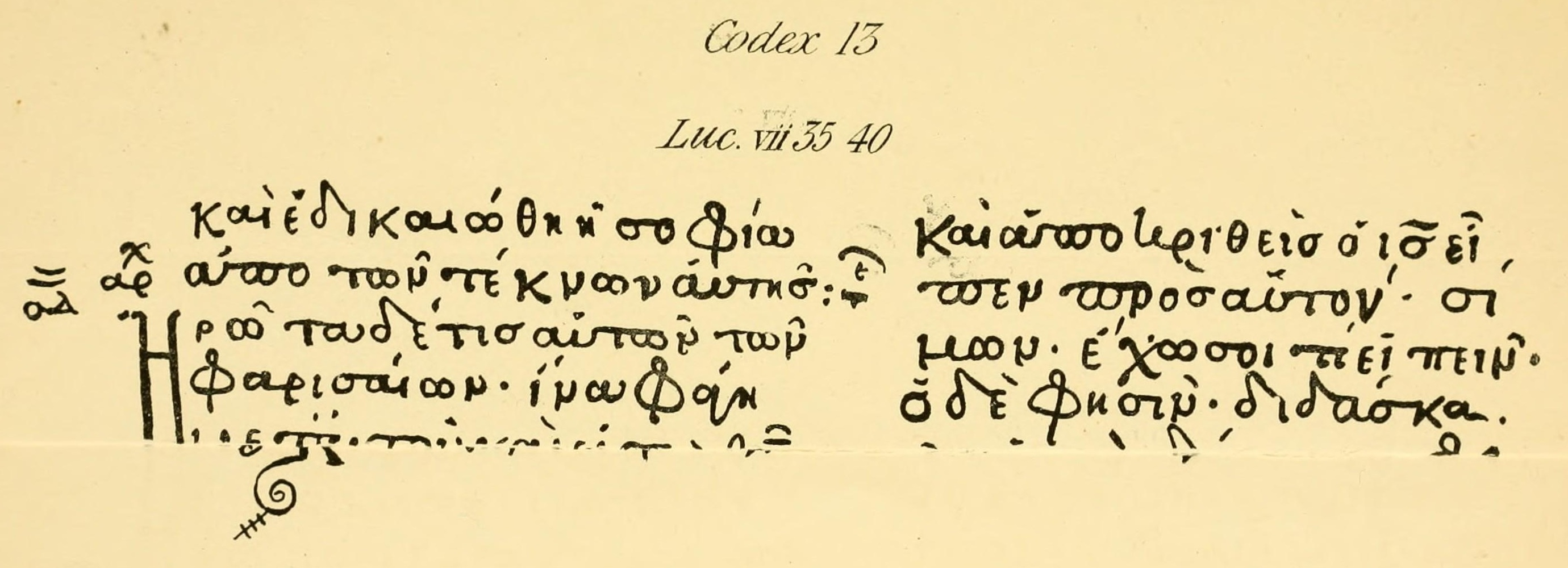
Abbot's facsimile with the text of Luke 7:35-40

It is believed the manuscript was written in Calabria or Sicily. It was in private hands, and belonged to Archbishop of Reims, Charles Maurice Le Tellier (1671–1710) (along with codices 10, 11). It was originally collated by the Abbé de Louvois for scholar Ludolph Kuster, who used it in his edition of theologian John Mill's edition of the Greek New Testament, Novum Testamentum (variants cited as Paris 6). It was subsequently collated by biblical scholar and textual critic Johann Jakob Wettstein, who gave it the number 13. (This number is still in use.) It has also been collated by textual critic Johann Jakob Griesbach, used by professor Andrew Birch for his edition of the Greek New Testament, studied again by Paulin Martin, and by Ferrar, and biblical scholar J. Rendel Harris. Biblical scholar C. R. Gregory saw the manuscript in 1884. Griesbach highly esteemed the text of this manuscript.

Though it was collated in 1868 by Ferrar, it was published posthumously by T. K. Abbott in the book A Collation of Four Important Manuscripts of the Gospels. Ferrar regarded codices 13, 69, 124, 346 as transcripts of the same archetype. Biblical scholar Kirsopp Lake built upon Ferrar's conclusions, and used the manuscript for an edition of the Gospel of Mark in Greek, reconstructing an archetype for the manuscripts which came to be known as the Ferrar Group or Family 13. The codex is now located at the National Library of France (shelf number Gr. 50) in Paris.

== See also ==
- Minuscule 14
- Minuscule 12
- List of New Testament minuscules
- Family 13
- Textual criticism
