= Minuscule 346 =

- New Testament manuscript
- Text: Gospels
- Date: 12th century
- Script: Greek
- Now at: Biblioteca Ambrosiana
- Cite: Scholz, Biblisch-kritische Reise (1823)
- Size: 22.3 cm by 16.5 cm
- Type: Caesarean text-type
- Category: III
- Hand: carelessly written
- Note: member of ƒ^{13}

Minuscule 346 is a Greek minuscule manuscript of the New Testament, written on parchment. It is designated by the siglum 346 in the Gregory-Aland numbering of New Testament manuscripts, and ε 226 in the von Soden numbering of New Testament manuscripts. Using the study of comparative handwriting styles (palaeography) it has been assigned to the 12th century. It has notes in the margin (known as marginalia).

== Description ==
The manuscript is a codex (precursor to the modern book format), containing the complete text of the four Gospels on 168 parchment leaves (22.3 cm by 16.5 cm), with one large gap (John 3:26–7:52). It also has the liturgical book with hagiographies: Synaxarion (a list of saint's days) and Menologion (a list of readings to be read each calendar month).

The text is written in one column per page, with 31–32 lines per page. According to Biblical scholar F. H. A. Scrivener, it was carelessly written.

The text is divided according to the chapters (known as κεφαλαια / kephalaia), whose numbers are given at the margin, and their titles (known as τιτλοι / titles) at the top of the pages. There is also a division according to the Ammonian Sections (in Mark 234 Sections – the last in 16:9), whose numbers are given at the margin, but without references to the Eusebian Canons (an early system of dividing the four Gospels into different sections).

It contains the tables of contents (also known as κεφαλαια) before each Gospel, lectionary markings in the margin (for liturgical use), subscriptions at the end of each Gospel, numbers of "remata", and numbers of στιχοι / stichoi (the list of lines written in each gospel).

== Text ==
The Greek text of the codex has been considered a representative of the Caesarean text-type. The text-types are groups of different New Testament manuscripts which share specific or generally related readings, which then differ from each other group, and thus the conflicting readings can separate out the groups. These are then used to determine the original text as published; there are three main groups with names: Alexandrian, Western, and Byzantine. The Caesarean text-type however (initially identified by biblical scholar Burnett Hillman Streeter) has been contested by several text-critics, such as Kurt and Barbara Aland. Aland placed it in Category III of his New Testament manuscript classification system. Category III manuscripts are described as having "a small but not a negligible proportion of early readings, with a considerable encroachment of [Byzantine] readings, and significant readings from other sources as yet unidentified."

It is a member of the textual family ƒ^{13}. According to the Claremont Profile Method it belongs to ƒ^{13} as a core member.

It has many unusual readings (e.g. Matt 1:16 — ω μνηστευθεισα παρθενος Μαριαμ εγεννησεν Ιησουν τον λεγομενον χριστον (to whom the virgin Mary had been betrothed, begat Jesus, the one called Christ)).

== History ==
Gregory dated the manuscript to the 12th century. It is currently dated by the INTF to the 12th century.

The manuscript was bought in 1606 at "Callipoli in Salentinis" (Calabria). The manuscript was examined by Scholz and Burgon. It was added to the list of New Testament manuscripts by Scholz (1794–1852). Text of the codex was collated by Abbott and edited by Ferrar. C. R. Gregory saw it in 1886.

The manuscript is currently housed at the Biblioteca Ambrosiana (S. 23 sup.) in Milan.

== See also ==
- List of New Testament minuscules
- Biblical manuscript
- Textual criticism
