= Thomas Kingsmill Abbott =

Irish scholar, educator, and clergyman

The Reverend Thomas Kingsmill Abbott
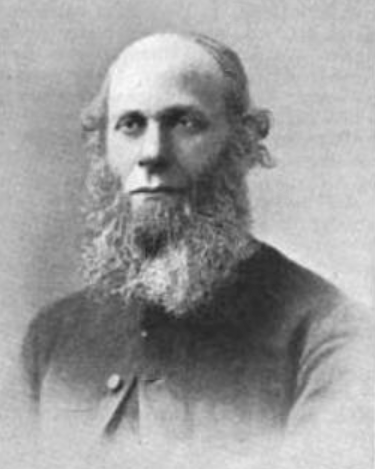
- In The Sketch, 18 December 1895
- Born: 26 March 1829; Dublin, Ireland
- Died: 18 December 1913 (aged 84); Killiney, Ireland
- Education: Trinity College, Dublin
- Occupations: Scholar, educator, clergyman
- Spouse: Caroline Kingsmill (m. 1859)

Thomas Kingsmill Abbott (26 March 1829 – 18 December 1913) was an Irish scholar, educator, and Church of Ireland clergyman.

== Biography ==
Abbott was born in Dublin and was educated at Trinity College. He was elected a scholar in 1848, graduated in 1851 as a senior moderator in mathematics and was made a fellow of the college in 1854. He obtained an M.A. and a D.Litt. (1891) from Trinity, and was ordained a minister in the Church of Ireland.

In 1852 he solved a geometrical problem posed by J. J. Sylvester.

He occupied the chair of moral philosophy (1867–72), of biblical Greek (1875–88), and of Hebrew (1879–1900). In 1887 he was elected librarian in Trinity and, in 1900, completed catalogues of the library's manuscript holdings. He became a senior fellow in 1897. He was one of a group of Irish scholars, including J. P. Mahaffy, who made significant contributions to the dissemination and study of the works of Immanuel Kant. His translation of Kant's Critique of Practical Reason remained the standard English version of the text well into the 20th century.

In June 1901, he received an honorary doctorate in Divinity from the University of Glasgow.

In 1859 he married Caroline Kingsmill, eldest daughter of the penologist Rev. Joseph Kingsmill.

He died in Killiney in Dublin on 18 December 1913.

== Select bibliography ==
- On a Greek Biblical Fragment Hermathena vol. XVII 1891, pp. 233–235.
- A collation of four important manuscripts of the Gospels: with a view to prove their common origin, and to restore the text of their archetype (Dublin: 1877)
- Kant's Introduction to Logic (fifth edition, 1878)
- The Elements of Logic (First Edition, 1883)
- Evangeliorum versio antihieronymiana ex codice Usseriano, 2 vols., 1884.
- Kant's Critique of Practical Reason and Other Works on the Theory of Ethics (London 1889)
- Essays chiefly on the original texts of the Old and New Testaments (1891)
- ed., The Book of Trinity College, Dublin, 1591–1891, 1892.
- The Elements of Logic (third edition, 1895)
- Fundamental Principles of the Metaphysics of Ethics (London 1895)
- A Critical and exegetical commentary on the Epistles to the Ephesians and to the Colossians (1897)
- Catalogue of the manuscripts in Trinity College, Dublin, 7, 1900.
- Elementary Theory of the Tides (second edition, 1901)
- Catalogue of Fifteenth Century Books in the Library of Trinity College, Dublin, etc. (1905)
- A translation of Kant's Ethics, with a memoir (sixth edition, 1909)
- Catalogue of the Irish manuscripts in the library of Trinity College, Dublin (1921)
