= Barbara Aland =

German theologian and professor (1937–2024)

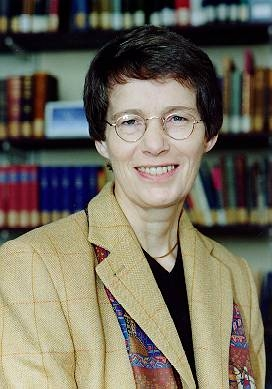
- Aland in 1998
- Born: 12 April 1937; Hamburg, Germany
- Died: 10 November 2024 (aged 87); Herdecke, North Rhine-Westphalia, Germany

Academic work
- Discipline: Biblical studies
- Sub-discipline: New Testament studies
- Notable ideas: Categories of New Testament manuscripts

Barbara Aland (née Ehlers, 12 April 1937 – 10 November 2024) was a German theologian and professor of New Testament Research and Church History at the University of Münster until 2002. She was internationally recognized for her work on the Novum Testamentum Graece and the Greek New Testament, which she undertook with her husband, Kurt Aland.

== Life and career ==
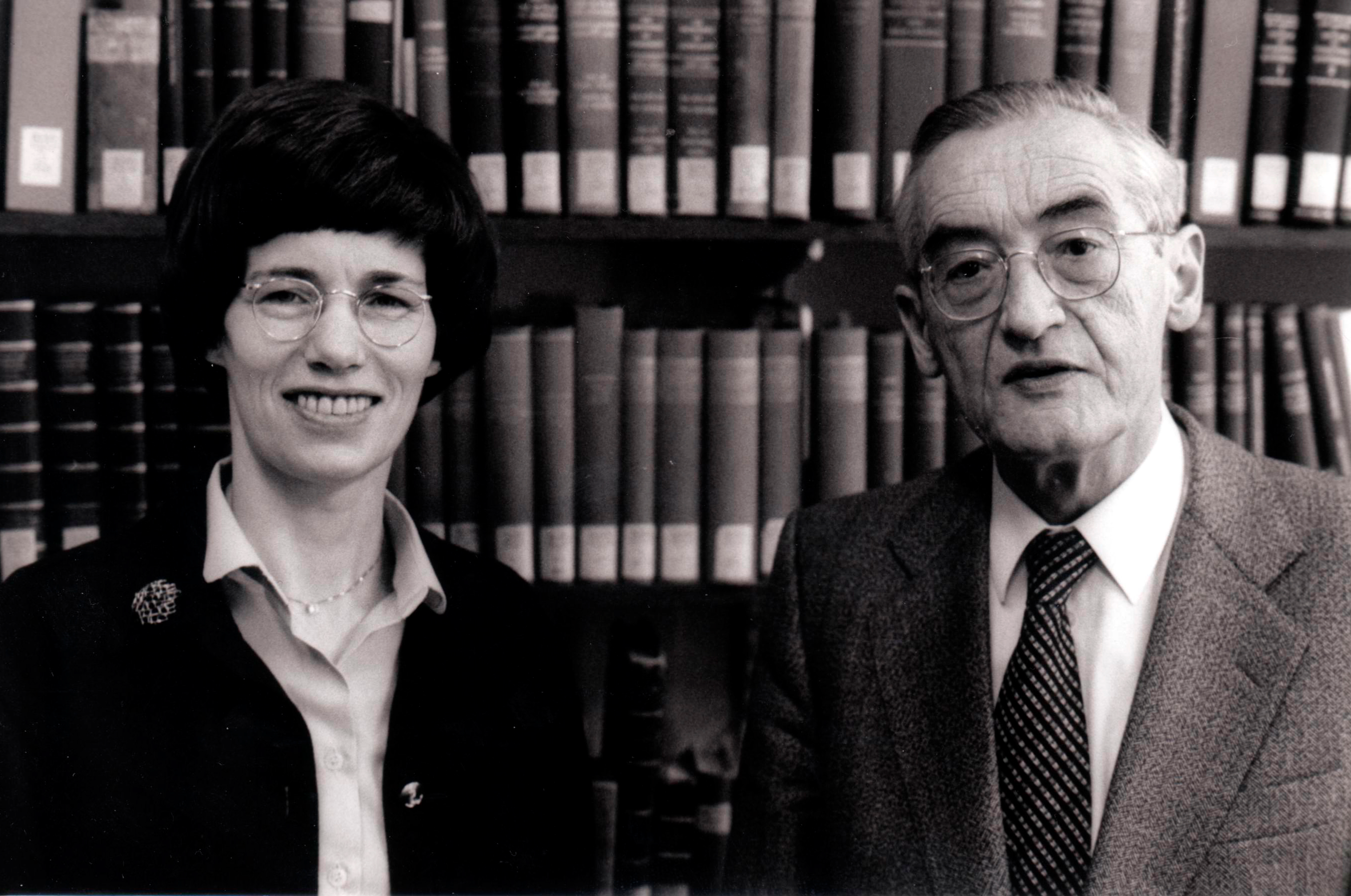
Barbara and Kurt Aland in 1988

Barbara Ehlers was born in Hamburg on 12 April 1937. After completing her degree in Theology and Classical Philology in Frankfurt, Marburg, and Kiel, she received her Ph.D. (dissertation on the Socratic Aeschines) in 1964 in Frankfurt. In 1969, she earned her licentiate from the Oriental faculty of the Pontificio Istituto Biblico in Rome.

In 1972, she completed her habilitation in Göttingen on the Syrian Gnostic Bardesanes of Edessa. From 1972, she worked as a lecturer at the University of Münster. She was appointed professor of Church History and New Testament research, with a focus on the Christian Orient, at the Protestant Theological Faculty there in 1980.

In 1983, she became director of the Institute for New Testament Textual Research, founded in 1959 by her husband, Kurt Aland, as well as of the associated Bible Museum Münster. The institute gained worldwide significance through its publication of the Novum Testamentum Graece, known as the Nestle–Aland, and the UBS Greek New Testament. Until her retirement, Aland also directed the Hermann Kunst-Stiftung to promote New Testament research. She retired in 2002 but continued to head the institute until 2004.

Aland died on 10 November 2024, at the age of 87.

== Relevance ==
Aland gained an international profile through her work on the Novum Testamentum Graece and the Greek New Testament, which she conducted with her husband, Kurt Aland. Together, they collaborated extensively with an international and interfaith group of theologians to update the Novum Testamentum Graece and the Greek New Testament. These editions, published by the institute in Münster, serve as foundational texts for education and research worldwide.

In 1997, she published the first installments of the Editio Critica Maior. This edition was the first to be based on the complete tradition of Greek manuscripts, patristic citations, and ancient versions.

In 1999, she became a founding member of the Academia Platonica Septima Monasteriensis, which focuses not only on the works of Plato but also on the writings of his early interpreters, spanning from ancient times to the Renaissance. The academy's goal is to promote the study of Platonist writings.

== Honours ==
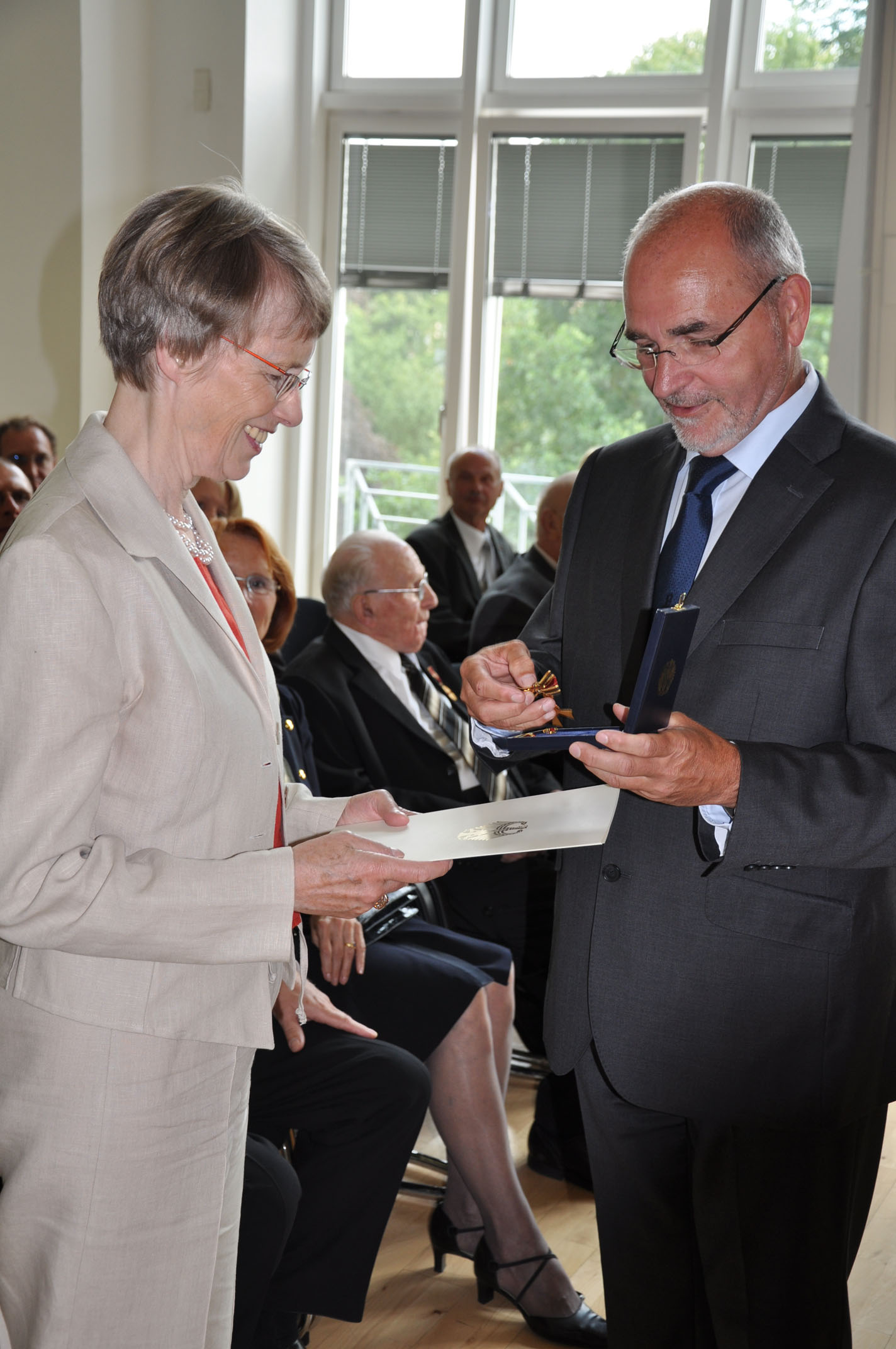
Aland receiving the Order of Merit of the Federal Republic of Germany, 2011

Aland achieved the following honorary doctoral degrees:

- 1988: "D.Litt." (Doctor of Literature), Wartburg College (Waverly/Iowa)
- 1989: "D.D." (Doctor of Divinity), Mount Saint Mary's College (Emmitsburg/Maryland)
- 2008: "Dr. theol. h.c.", (Doctor of Theology), University of Halle-Wittenberg, Germany

She received following awards:

- 1998: Paulus-Plakette of Münster
- 2005: Fellow of Clare Hall, Cambridge
- 2006: Member of the Royal Netherlands Academy of Arts and Sciences
- 2011: Order of Merit of the Federal Republic of Germany
- 2016: Burkitt Medal for Biblical Studies

== Works ==
Dissertation

- (as Barbara Ehlers): Eine vorplatonische Deutung des sokratischen Eros. Der Dialog Aspasia des Sokratikers Aischines. Dissertation. Frankfurt am Main 1964, published 1966 (Zetemata, issue 41).

Monographs

- (with Kurt Aland): Der Text des Neuen Testaments. Einführung in die wissenschaftlichen Ausgaben sowie in Theorie und Praxis der modernen Textkritik, 1982.
  - English translation: The text of the New Testament. An introduction to the critical editions and to the theory and practice of modern textual criticism. 1987.
- Erziehung durch Kirchengeschichte? Ein Plädoyer für mehr Kirchengeschichte im Religionsunterricht. Published: Idea e.V., 1984. OCLC 74630516
- Frühe direkte Auseinandersetzung zwischen Christen, Heiden und Häretikern. 2005. ISBN 978-3-11-018912-4
- Was ist Gnosis? Studien zum frühen Christentum, zu Marcion und zur kaiserzeitlichen Philosophie. 2009 ISBN 978-3-16-149967-8

Editions of the New Testament

- A Textual Commentary on the Greek New Testament. A Companion Volume to the United Bible Societies Greek New Testament (third edition) by B. M. Metzger on behalf of and in cooperation with the Editorial Committee of the United Bible Societies Greek New Testament K. Aland, M. Black, C. M. Martini, B. M. Metzger and A. Wikgren, 1971. ISBN 978-3-438-06010-5
- Novum Testamentum Graece post Eberhard Nestle et Erwin Nestle communiter ed. K. Aland, M. Black, C. M. Martini, B. M. Metzger, A. Wikgren, apparatum criticum recens. et editionem novis curis elaborav. K. Aland et B. Aland una cum Instituto studiorum textus Novi Testamenti Monasteriensi (Westphalia), 26th edition, 1979. ISBN 978-3-438-05158-5
- Novum Testamentum Latine. Novam Vulgatam Bibliorum Sacrorum Editionem secuti apparatibus titulisque additis ediderunt Kurt Aland et Barbara Aland una cum Instituto studiorum textus Novi Testamenti Monasteriensi, 1984. ISBN 978-3-438-05300-8
- Griechisch-deutsches Wörterbuch zu den Schriften des Neuen Testaments und der frühchristlichen Literatur by Walter Bauer. 6th edition, Institut für Neutestamentliche Textforschung Münster, with Viktor Reichmann, ed. by Kurt Aland and Barbara Aland, 1988. ISBN 978-3-11-010647-3

Publications

- Gnosis. Festschrift für Hans Jonas, with Ugo Bianchi, ed. by Barbara Aland, 1978. ISBN 978-3-525-58111-7
- Günther Zuntz: Lukian von Antiochien und der Text der Evangelien. ed. Barbara Aland and Klaus Wachtel. With an obituary for the author by Martin Hengel, 1995. ISBN 978-3-8253-0342-6
- Die Weltlichkeit des Glaubens in der Alten Kirche. Festschrift für Ulrich Wickert zum siebzigsten Geburtstag. With Barbara Aland and Christoph Schäublin, ed. by Dietmar Wyrwa, 1997. ISBN 978-3-11-015441-2
- Literarische Konstituierung von Identifikationsfiguren in der Antike, ed. by Barbara Aland, 2003.
