= The Calling discography =

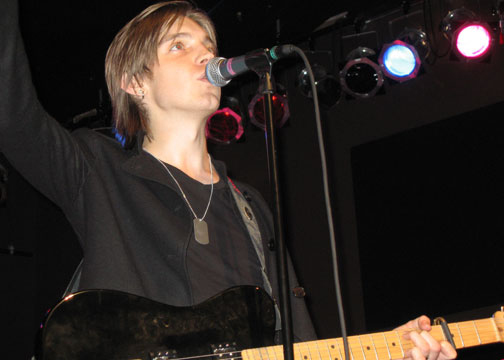
- Lead singer Alex Band in 2007
- Studio albums: 3
- Compilation albums: 1
- Singles: 10
- Music videos: 10

The discography of The Calling, an American alternative rock band, consists of three studio albums, one compilation album, and ten singles.

== Albums ==
=== Studio albums ===
List of studio albums, with selected chart positions and certifications
Title	Album details	Peak chart positions										Certifications
Title	Album details	US	AUS	AUT	FRA	GER	ITA	NLD	SWE	SWI	UK	Certifications
Camino Palmero	Released: July 10, 2001 (US); Label: RCA; Formats: CD, cassette, digital download	36	23	9	10	8	16	46	11	26	12	RIAA: Platinum; BPI: Platinum
Two	Released: June 8, 2004 (US); Label: RCA; Formats: CD, digital download	54	96	19	40	17	17	66	51	23	9	BPI: Silver
Before the World Turns to Dust	Released: September 25, 2026; Label: TLG Rock; Formats: CD, digital download	—	—	—	—	—	—	—	—	—	—	

=== Compilation albums ===
List of compilation albums
Title	Album details
The Very Best of The Calling	Released: February 11, 2011 (US); Label: Camden; Formats: CD

== Singles ==
List of singles, with selected chart positions, showing year released and album name
Title	Year	Peak chart positions										Certifications	Album
Title	Year	US	US Adult	AUS	AUT	GER	ITA	NLD	NZ	SWI	UK	Certifications	Album
"Wherever You Will Go"	2001	5	1	5	8	16	1	31	1	7	3	RIAA: 2× Platinum; ARIA: Platinum; BPI: 2× Platinum; BVMI: Gold; FIMI: Platinum; RMNZ: 3× Platinum	Camino Palmero
"Adrienne"	2002	— (Note: "Adrienne" did not enter the Billboard Hot 100, but peaked at number 16 on the Bubbling Under Hot 100 Singles chart, which acts as an extension to the Hot 100.)	22	60	50	68	21	81	—	64	18		Camino Palmero
"Could It Be Any Harder"	2002	—	35	—	—	—	—	—	—	—	—		Camino Palmero
"For You"	2003	—	41	—	—	80	19	45	—	91	—		Daredevil: The Album
"Our Lives"	2004	— (Note: "Our Lives" did not enter the Billboard Hot 100, but peaked at number 25 on the Bubbling Under Hot 100 Singles chart, which acts as an extension to the Hot 100.)	16	63	72	63	11	65	—	72	13		Two
"Things Will Go My Way"	2004	—	—	—	—	—	49	99	—	—	34		Two
"Anything"	2004	—	23	—	—	—	—	100	—	—	—		Two
"Fallin' Apart"	2023	—	—	—	—	—	—	—	—	—	—		Non-album single
"Stand Up Now"	2024	—	—	—	—	—	—	—	—	—	—		Before the World Turns to Dust
"Dust"	2026	—	27	—	—	—	—	—	—	—	—		Before the World Turns to Dust
"—" denotes a recording that did not chart or was not released in that territory.

== Music videos ==
Year	Song	Director(s)
2001	"Wherever You Will Go"	Gregory Dark
2002	"Adrienne"	Nigel Dick
2002	"Could It Be Any Harder"	Meiert Avis
2003	"For You"	Meiert Avis
2004	"Our Lives"	Liz Friedlander
2004	"Things Will Go My Way"	Craig D’Entrone and Dylan Verrechia
2004	"Anything"	N/A
2023	"Fallin' Apart"	Jake Nam
2024	"Stand Up Now"	N/A
2026	"Dust"	Tom Flynn
