= Before the World Turns to Dust =

Studio album by the Calling
- Released: September 25, 2026
- Recorded: 2023–2026
- Genres: Alternative rock; pop rock; rock
- Length: 50:04
- Labels: TLG Rock; Virgin
- Producers: The Calling; John Fields

The Calling chronology
Two (2004)	Before the World Turns to Dust (2026)

Singles from Before the World Turns to Dust
- 1. "Stand Up Now" Released: May 3, 2024; 2. "Dust" Released: July 10, 2026

Before the World Turns to Dust is the third studio album by the American alternative rock band the Calling. It was released in 2026 through TLG Rock and distributed by the Virgin Music Group. The album marks the band's first full-length studio release in over 22 years, following their 2004 album Two and a subsequent extended hiatus.

The record was written collaboratively by the core lineup of lead vocalist Alex Band, guitarist Daniel Damico, and bassist Dom Liberati. The album's release is being supported by the international Before the World Turns to Dust Tour, which also coincides with the 25th anniversary of their multi-platinum debut album, Camino Palmero (2001), and its hit single "Wherever You Will Go".

== Background and composition ==
Following the release of their second album Two, The Calling entered an extended hiatus in 2005. Over the next decade, frontman Alex Band pursued a solo career, releasing two EPs and a solo album, though the venture was ultimately stalled by label bankruptcy.

In 2011, Band was diagnosed with Parkinson's disease, which severely restricted his physical mobility and forced a temporary halt to his musical career; he later revealed the condition was initially misdiagnosed, allowing him to regain mobility after extensive medical management. Band revived the band's moniker for international touring in 2016 as the sole remaining original member and established a stable touring lineup that included Daniel Thomson, Travis Loafman, and Joey Clement.

In 2023, Band reconfigured the Calling with new permanent members Daniel Damico and Dom Liberati. In early 2026, during the Southeast Asian leg of their promotional tour, the band announced that they had been accumulating and writing new material together over the previous two years. Band noted that while previous records relied heavily on outside songwriters and studio musicians, Before the World Turns to Dust marks the first time the core trio wrote an entire record collaboratively.

== Album title and cover ==
The title of the album is derived from a lyric in the lead single, "Dust," which states: "Before the world turns to dust, love will find us."

The artwork depicts band members Alex Band, Daniel Damico, and Dom Liberati standing amidst the ruins of a grand cathedral whose ceiling has dissolved into a swirling, vibrant cosmic nebula, with a rain of glowing geometric shards and debris falling around them, reflecting the album's title.

== Promotion and singles ==
The band officially began teasing the album era in late 2025 and early 2026 with the "Before the World Turns to Dust Tour," hitting markets across South America and the Philippines. During live sets on the tour, the band premiered two new tracks live: "Hold On Me" and "Don't You Cry."

In May 2026, the band announced that the official lead single from the album, titled "Dust", would be released on July 10, 2026. The announcement was accompanied by a slate of rescheduled North American tour dates spanning August and September 2026, which were strategically shifted to align with the record label's rollout of the new single.

== Track listing ==
All tracks are written by Alex Band, Daniel Damico, and Dominic Liberati, except where noted.

No.	Title	Length
1.	"Stand Up Now" (Band, Damico)	3:58
2.	"Finally"	3:51
3.	"Dust"	3:35
4.	"Don't You Cry"	3:25
5.	"Runyon Skies" (Damico, Liberati)	1:08
6.	"Hold On Me"	3:19
7.	"Strange"	3:35
8.	"Stay"	4:02
9.	"11th Hour" (Damico, Liberati)	0:58
10.	"Won't Let You Down"	3:39
11.	"Heaven"	4:30
12.	"Crystal Ball"	3:57
13.	"Saudade" (Damico, Liberati)	0:52
14.	"The Fool That You Are" (Band, Sean Kipe)	5:00
15.	"How Long"	4:22
Total length:		50:04

== Personnel ==
Credits are adapted from Tidal.

=== The Calling ===
- Alex Band – vocals (tracks 1–12, 14, 15), co-production (1–4, 6–8, 10–12, 14, 15), production (5, 9, 13)
- Daniel Damico – guitars (1–12, 14, 15), co-production (1–4, 6–8, 10–12, 14, 15), keyboards (1, 3, 4, 6, 13), piano (5, 8, 11, 14), production (5, 9, 13), background vocals (11)
- Dominic Liberati – programming (1–13); bass, co-production (1–4, 6–8, 10–12, 14, 15); background vocals (2–4, 6–8, 10, 11, 14), keyboards (2, 3, 6, 10, 12, 15); production, mixing (5, 9, 13)

=== Additional contributors ===
- John Fields – production (1–4, 6–8, 10–12, 14, 15)
- Justin Shurtz – mastering
- Tom Lord-Alge – mixing (1)
- Chris Lord-Alge – mixing (2–4, 6–8, 10–12, 14, 15)
- Brian Judd – mixing assistance (2–4, 6–8, 10–12, 14, 15)
- Dorian Crozier – drums (1, 3)
- Tim Pierce – guitars (1)
- Chris McHugh – drums (2, 8, 10, 11, 14, 15)
- Dan Lawonn – cello (3, 4, 12)
- Steve Goold – drums (4, 6, 7, 12)
- Tommy Barbarella – keyboards, string ensemble (14)

== Charts ==
Chart performance for Before the World Turns to Dust
Chart (2026)	Peak position
UK Album Downloads (Official Charts)	27
