= Yasmin Lucas =

Brazilian singer and songwriter (born 1990)

Laís Yasmin
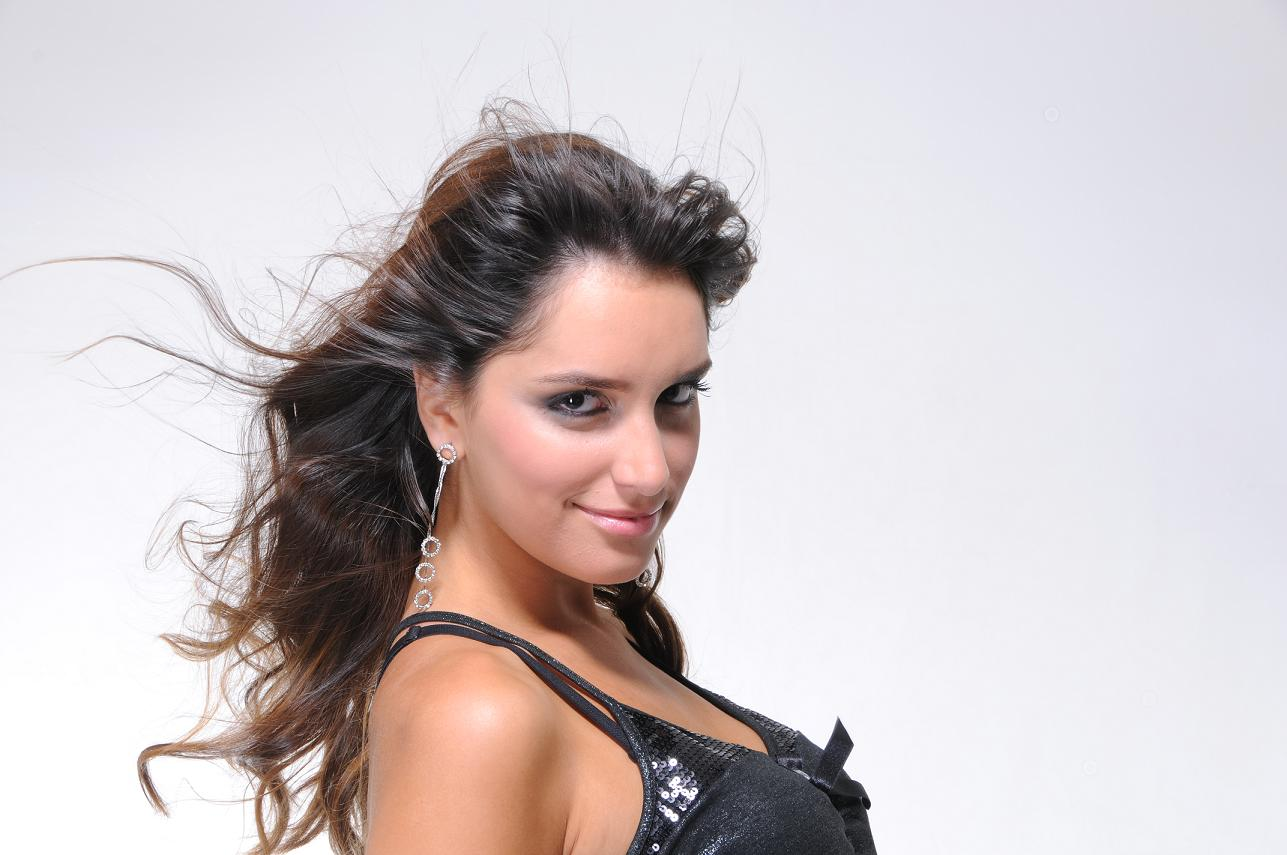

Background information
- Born: Laís Yasmin Lucas Gontijo; 16 December 1990 (age 35); Cuiabá, Mato Grosso, Brazil
- Genres: Pop, MPB, sertanejo, jazz
- Occupation: Singer
- Instruments: Vocals, piano
- Years active: 1995–present

Laís Yasmin Lucas Gontijo (Cuiabá, 16 December 1990) is a Brazilian singer and songwriter.

== Biography ==
Yasmin Lucas began her career at age 5 by recording music for a Brazilian soap opera, in 2004 Yasmin traveled to Greece to record the theme song of Greek Paralympic Games in Brazil.

In 2008, Yasmin Lucas represented Brazil in the New Orleans Jazz & Heritage Festival in New Orleans singing the song "Fever" and impress many critics of music, recorded music that was the subject of the movie Pokémon 3: The Movie, became known in Europe due to the overwhelming success of the song "Acontece Esquece", and made her name in the international market singing with Alex Band, former lead singer of The Calling.

== Discography ==
Studio albums

- 1997: Yasmin
- 2000: Declaração
- 2002: O Mundo dos Sonhos de Yasmin
- 2013: Lais

Singles

| Ano | Título | Melhor posição | | Álbum |
| Ano | Título | BRA | BRA Kids | Álbum |
|---|---|---|---|---|
| 2000 | "Declaração" | — | 4 | Yasmin |
| 2002 | "Eu Gosto de Você" (I Wanna Be With You)" | — | 22 | O Mundo dos Sonhos de Yasmin |
| 2002 | "O Que É o Amor" (On My Own)" | 44 | 34 | O Mundo dos Sonhos de Yasmin |
| 2005 | "With You" (feat. Kyle Wyley) | 84 | — | Prova de Amor |
| 2009 | "In Your Heart I'm Home" (feat. Alex Band) | 47 | — | —N/a |
| 2013 | "Eu Só Queria Te Amar" | 32 | — | Laís |
| 2017 | "Previsível pra Você" | — | — | —N/a |
| 2020 | "Em Busca das Flores" | — | — | —N/a |
| 2021 | "Minha Voz" | — | — | —N/a |
