= Anything (The Calling song) =

Single by the Calling

from the album Two
- Released: 2004
- Genre: Alternative rock
- Length: 4:05
- Label: RCA
- Songwriters: Alex Band, Aaron Kamin
- Producers: Alex Band, Aaron Kamin, Clif Magness

The Calling singles chronology
"Things Will Go My Way" (2004)	"Anything" (2004)	"Fallin' Apart" (2023)

Music video
- "Anything" on YouTube

"Anything" is the third and final single released by the rock band the Calling from their second album Two. It was their last single to be released before they split up in 2005. The music video portrays the members of the band performing a live concert in front of a girl's house (portrayed by the Alex Band's wife Jennifer Sky).

== Critical reception ==
Chuck Taylor from Billboard praised the song for being both "expertly crafted" and "a crisp musical breath of fresh air", concluding that "With this played beside Bowling for Soup's "1985," adult top 40 will be having more fun than anyone else on the dial."

== Charts ==
Chart (2004)	Peak position
Netherlands (Single Top 100)	100
