= We've All Been There =

Studio album by Alex Band
- Released: June 29, 2010
- Recorded: 2005–2007
- Genre: Alternative rock, post-grunge
- Length: 53:17
- Label: AMB/EMI
- Producer: John Fields, Chuck Reed, Matt Serletic, Tal Herzberg

Alex Band chronology
Alex Band EP (2008)	We've All Been There (2010)	After the Storm (2012)

Alternative cover
- International cover

Alternative cover
- Japanese cover

Professional ratings
Review scores
Source	Rating
BlogCritics	(favourable)
Melodic.net	4/5 stars
allmusic.com	3/5 stars

We've All Been There is the debut solo album by American singer-songwriter Alex Band, best known for being the former lead vocalist and songwriter of rock band The Calling. The album was released on June 29, 2010, through Band's own label, AMB Records, in a distribution deal with EMI Records.

The album was delayed numerous times since recording was originally completed back in 2007. Band had initially signed a deal with Geffen Records, but later ventured onto his own label after eventually buying back the rights to the master tapes after Geffen had gone through major restructuring.

Lead single "Tonight", was released along with a music video on February 15, 2010.

== Background ==
After The Calling had released their second album Two (2004), bandmate Aaron Kamin had amicably decided to work on separate projects with Band being left to do "pretty much everything on my own". This caused Band to put The Calling on hiatus and venture into a solo career. Soon afterward, the vocalist had signed a deal with Geffen Records to record a solo album.

Recording took place over a two-year period, eventually encompassing five co-producers, primarily including John Fields (Switchfoot), Daniel Damico and engineer Tal Herzberg, with Chuck Reed and Matt Serletic also working on tracks. Several session musicians were brought in to play on the record alongside Band, who himself contributed guitar and bass. Musicians such as Abe Laboriel Jr. (drums), Jamie Muhoberac (keyboards) and Tim Pierce (guitar) were also drafted in. Paul Buckmaster (Elton John) contributed string arrangements to several tracks, while Chris Lord-Alge mixed the album, having previously done so with The Calling.

"Fans should expect to hear a more mature sound with big anthemic songs that have tons of meaning behind them. I put everything I had into this album and had plenty of time to make each song as perfect as it could be. Needless to say, I am very proud of it."
— Alex Band describing We've All Been There.

Later in 2007, Geffen went through major restructuring, this coupled with the death of Band's long-term Manager Stu Sobol, meant the album was left in limbo. Band explained, "At the same time, Stu Sobol, my manager for 10 years passed away, which was incredibly sad. So, between Geffen going through major changes and Stu passing away, I realised then that I had to make a serious leap of faith and believe in myself. I decided that, if I’m gonna fail, I’d rather fail doing what I want to do." Band would spend a year negotiating with Geffen to buy back the master tapes.

Band later described the recording process as, "a huge challenge due to all the drama within the label". Alex named his favourite songs on the album as "Please" and "Leave", while also stating that for future albums the recording process would be much more enjoyable as he is now releasing his music independently. Speaking of the troubles he faced with Geffen among other labels, he explained that they wanted to make such "different sounding music" to what he was writing at the time, which eventually led him to set up his own independent label. Almost three years after recording had been initially finished, he agreeing a partnership deal with EMI Records for distribution of the album throughout the world. The music video for lead single, "Tonight" was filmed in double time to achieve the desired slowed down effects in the editing stages. Band's new fiancée features in the video.

== Track listing ==
All songs written by Alex Band.

No.	Title	Length
1.	"We've All Been There"	4:00
2.	"What Is Love"	3:53
3.	"Tonight"	3:57
4.	"Forever Yours"	3:12
5.	"Please"	3:53
6.	"Will Not Back Down"	4:04
7.	"Euphoria"	3:54
8.	"Never Let You Go"	3:52
9.	"Only One"	3:36
10.	"Leave (Today Is the Day)"	3:34
11.	"Holding On"	3:18
12.	"Without You"	4:20
13.	"Love"	3:38
14.	"Start Over Again"	4:06

Deluxe Edition Bonus Track
No.	Title	Length
15.	"Cruel One" (feat. Chantal Kreviazuk & Emmy Rossum)	4:32

=== International edition ===
No.	Title	Length
1.	"We've All Been There"	4:01
2.	"Tonight"	4:01
3.	"Forever Yours"	3:13
4.	"Will Not Back Down"	4:06
5.	"Please"	3:53
6.	"Without You"	4:20
7.	"Only One"	3:40
8.	"Leave (Today Is the Day)"	3:35
9.	"Never Let You Go"	3:52
10.	"Euphoria"	3:55
11.	"What Is Love"	3:54
12.	"Start Over Again"	4:06

Bonus Track
No.	Title	Length
13.	"Love"	3:39

Japanese Bonus Tracks
No.	Title	Length
14.	"Tonight" (Acoustic Version)
15.	"Rest Of Our Lives"

== Personnel ==
The following personnel contributed to We've All Been There:

- Alex Band — lead vocals, backing vocals, rhythm guitar, bass guitar, lyrics
- Daniel Damico – songwriting, guitar, piano, programming, strings, engineering
- Jamie Muhoberac — keyboard, piano
- Tim Pierce — lead guitar
- Abe Laboriel Jr. — drums, percussion
- Paul Buckmaster — string arrangement
- Dorian Crozier — additional drums
- Kenny Aronoff — additional drums
- John Fields — record producer
- Chuck Reed — producer
- Matt Serletic — producer
- Tal Herzberg – producer
- Chris Lord-Alge — mixing

== Charts ==
Chart (2010)	Peak position
Austrian Albums Chart	17
European Top 100 Albums	47
German Albums Chart	12
Swiss Albums Chart	46
US Albums Chart	42
