= Josie DiVincenzo =

American television and film actress

- Born: Buffalo, New York, USA
- Occupation: Actress
- Years active: 1995–present

Josie DiVincenzo is an American television and film actress. She has had roles in series such as CSI: Crime Scene Investigation and Beverly Hills, 90210, and has appeared in films including Daredevil (2003). She also appeared in episode 16 of series 2 of Friends as the Tattoo artist.
