= Clubhouse (TV series) =

American drama television series

- Genre: Drama
- Created by: Daniel Cerone
- Written by: Daniel Cerone; Leonard Dick; Joseph Dougherty; Ashley Gable; Matt McGough; Jonathan Moskin; David Mulei; Gavin O'Connor
- Directed by: Frederick King Keller; Joanna Kerns; Jerry Levine; Steve Gomer; Gavin O'Connor; Oz Scott; Bryan Spicer
- Starring: Jeremy Sumpter; Dean Cain; Mare Winningham; Christopher Lloyd; Kirsten Storms; John Ortiz; J. D. Pardo; Dan Byrd
- Opening theme: "Our Lives" by The Calling
- Country of origin: United States
- Original language: English
- No. of seasons: 1
- No. of episodes: 11

Production
- Executive producers: Daniel Cerone; Bruce Davey; Mel Gibson; Aaron Spelling; Ken Topolsky; E. Duke Vincent
- Producers: Paul Marks; Nancy Cotton; Leonard Dick
- Production locations: Los Angeles, California
- Running time: 60 minutes
- Production companies: Icon Productions; Spelling Television

Original release
- Network: CBS; HDNet (episodes 6–11)
- Release: September 26, 2004 – August 4, 2005

Clubhouse is an American drama television series starring Jeremy Sumpter, Dean Cain, Christopher Lloyd, Mare Winningham and Kirsten Storms and produced by Icon Productions in association with Spelling Television. The theme song is "Our Lives" by The Calling.

Clubhouse originally aired in the United States on CBS on September 26 to November 6, 2004, leaving 6 of the 11 episodes from the first season unaired. The remaining episodes later aired on HDNet from June 30 to August 4, 2005.

== Premise ==
The series is about a boy who gets his dream job working as a batboy for his favorite major-league baseball team, the fictional New York Empires. Throughout the story, 15-year-old Pete Young (played by Sumpter) goes through normal and not so normal problems of a teenager. Pete's sister (played by Storms) is a rebellious teen who deals with drinking, sex, and drugs.

The show is based on the experiences of Matthew McGough, a batboy for the New York Yankees who graduated from Williams College and Fordham University School of Law, and lives in New York City. His book Bat Boy: Coming of Age with the New York Yankees was published by Doubleday in 2005. ISBN 978-0-307-27864-7

== Cast ==
=== Main ===
- Jeremy Sumpter as Pete Young
- Dean Cain as Conrad Dean
- Dan Byrd as Mike Dougherty
- Kirsten Storms as Betsy Young
- Mare Winningham as Lynne Young
- Christopher Lloyd as Lou Russo
- J. D. Pardo as Jose Marquez
- John Ortiz as Carlos Tavares

=== Recurring ===
- Michael Jai White as Ellis Hayes
- Gabriel Salvador as Chris Pontecorvo
- Kevin G. Schmidt as Brad Saminski
- Tony Ervolina as Bobby
- Leah Pipes as Jesse
- Steve Trombly as Bulldog
- Brian Tahash as Chuck
- Al White as Joe Ross
- Nancy Cassaro as Gwen
- Spencer Grammer as Sheila
- Cherry Jones as Sister Marie
- Jim Nantz as himself
- Richard Steinmetz as General Manager
- Greg Bond as Rudnick
- Christopher Wiehl as Kenny Baines
- Charles S. Dutton as Stuart Truman
- Derrick McMillon as Detective Turnbull

== Episodes ==
No.	Title	Directed by	Written by	Original release date
1	"Pilot"	Gavin O'Connor	Teleplay by : Daniel Cerone; Story by : Daniel Cerone & Matthew McGough	September 26, 2004
2	"Breaking a Slump"	Frederick King Keller	Daniel Cerone	September 28, 2004
3	"Chin Music"	Oz Scott	Paul Manning	October 12, 2004
4	"Trade Talks"	Joanna Kerns	Sheila Lawrence	October 19, 2004
5	"Spectator Interference"	Martha Mitchell	Joseph Dougherty	November 6, 2004
6	"Road Trip"	Jeff Bleckner	Teleplay by : Daniel Cerone & Sheila Lawerence; Story by : Matthew McGough	June 30, 2005 (on HDNet)
7	"Between First and Home"	Steve Gomer	Ilana Bar-Din Giannini	July 7, 2005 (on HDNet)
8	"Stealing Home"	Jerry Levine	Leonard Dick	July 14, 2005 (on HDNet)
9	"Save Situation"	Scott Brazil	Ashley Gable	July 21, 2005 (on HDNet)
10	"Old Timers Day"	Bryan Spicer	Jonathan Moskin & David Mulei	July 28, 2005 (on HDNet)
11	"Player Rep"	Bob Singer	Joseph Dougherty	August 4, 2005 (on HDNet)
