= Jennifer Sky =

American actress and model

- Occupations: Actress and model
- Years active: 1994-2010 (actress); 2014-present (photographer)
- Spouse: Alex Band (m. 2004; div. 2009)

Jennifer Sky (born 13 October 1976) is a retired American actress and model and currently a photographer. She has General Hospital (1997–1998), Xena: Warrior Princess in 1999 and starred as the title character in Cleopatra 2525 (2000–2001). She has also appeared in Fastlane (2002), CSI: Miami (2004/05) and in the final episode of Columbo (2003).

== Career ==
Sky was raised in Jensen Beach, Florida. At 15, she was offered two months of summer modeling in Japan. She left for New York City at 17 to study acting under the tutelage of several acclaimed acting coaches, and became well-versed in the Meisner technique.

Sky has appeared on television in Buffy the Vampire Slayer in 1997. She has portrayed Sarah Webber on the ABC daytime soap opera General Hospital (1997–1998) and Amarice in Xena: Warrior Princess (1999), and starred as the title character in the American syndicated science-fiction television series Cleopatra 2525 (2000/01). She also appeared in Fastlane (2002), in Charmed (2003), in "Columbo Likes the Nightlife", the final episode of Columbo (2003) and in CSI: Miami (2004/05). Sky appeared

In 2003, she was ranked number 90 on the Maxim Hot 100 Women.

After retiring from acting, she studied media. Since 2014, she has worked as a fine art photographer, and posts on Instagram under the accounts "jenniferskyreal" and the art account "artbyjennifersky".

=== Working conditions in the fashion industry ===
In an op-ed entitled "My Life as a Warrior Princess", published on September 10, 2013 in the The New York Times, Sky compared the working conditions as a teenage fashion model, which she experienced as abusive and exploitative, with the much superior working conditions as an actress. She described how inspirational she found her work on the show Xena: Warrior Princess.

In a February 2014 YouTube video, Sky denounced the fashion industry as systematically abusive and described the emotional, professional, and sexual mistreatment she suffered over the course of her career. She called upon viewers to fight for the creation of labor unions for models, stricter regulations on the employment of children.

== Personal life ==
Sky married Alex Band of The Calling on July 25, 2004. The couple split in 2009.

In 2005, she was diagnosed with benign tumors taking up 60 percent of her liver. She underwent four years of experimental treatments and an operation that left a big scar, in effect ending her acting and modelling career.

== Filmography ==
=== Film ===
Year	Title	Role	Notes
2001	Trigger Happy	Jane	
2001	Shallow Hal	Nightclub Goer #2	
2002	Shop Club	Tina	
2002	My Little Eye	Charlie	
2003	Fish Without a Bicycle	Hot Girl	
2004	Never Die Alone	Janet	
2005	The Helix... Loaded	Lola	
2008	Meet Market	Courtney	
2010	Somewhere	Pretty Girl at Loud Table	Uncredited

=== Television ===
Year	Title	Role	Notes
1994	SeaQuest DSV	Shop Girl	Episode: "Sympathy for the Deep"
1996	Our Son, the Matchmaker	Judy Adams	Television film
1997	Buffy the Vampire Slayer	Heidi Barrie	Episode: "The Pack"
1997	Pacific Blue	Bree Hopkins	Episode: "Rumplestiltskin"
1997–1998	General Hospital	Sarah Webber	Recurring role
1998	Sins of the City	Callie	Episode: "Blind Eye for Hire"
1999	Xena: Warrior Princess	Amarice	Recurring role, 6 episodes
2000–2001	Cleopatra 2525	Cleopatra 'Cleo'	Main role
2002	Boomtown	Laura / Vanessa Griggs	Episode: "Possession"
2002	CSI: Crime Scene Investigation	Matilda	Episode: "Abra Cadaver"
2002–2003	Fastlane	Cassidy Shaw	Episodes: Pilot, "Slippery Slope"
2003	Columbo	Vanessa Farrow	Episode: "Columbo Likes the Nightlife"
2003	Charmed	Mabel Stillman	Episode: "The Power of Three Blondes"
2003	Dragnet	Melissa Edgar	Episode: "The Magic Bullet"
2004–2005	CSI: Miami	Cookie Devine / Sara Piper	Episodes: "Innocent", "Game Over"
