= Cleopatra 2525 =

American science fiction television series

- Genre: Science fiction
- Created by: R.J. Stewart; Robert G. Tapert
- Starring: Gina Torres; Victoria Pratt; Jennifer Sky
- Opening theme: "In the Year 2525", performed by Gina Torres
- Composer: Joseph LoDuca
- Country of origin: United States
- Original language: English
- No. of seasons: 2
- No. of episodes: 28

Production
- Executive producers: Sam Raimi; R.J. Stewart; Robert G. Tapert
- Production locations: Auckland, New Zealand
- Camera setup: Single-camera
- Running time: 22–24 minutes (2000); 45–48 minutes (2001)
- Production company: Renaissance Pictures

Original release
- Network: Syndication
- Release: January 17, 2000 – March 5, 2001

Cleopatra 2525 is an American science fiction television series that aired in syndication for two seasons, from January 2000 to March 2001. Produced by Renaissance Pictures and distributed by Studios USA Television Distribution, many stations aired it as part of the Back2Back Action Hour, along with Jack of All Trades.

== Plot ==
Five hundred years into the future, she will enter a world where machines rule the earth. Mankind has been driven underground. And Cleopatra is about to discover—there's no place like home!

— opening narration

Cleo, a 20th-century exotic dancer, is put into suspended animation after complications during breast augmentation surgery. Waking 525 years in the future, Cleo joins two women in their fight against the Baileys, armed flying machines that now control Earth's surface. Her team leader, Hel is commanded by a mysterious female entity called "Voice", who relays orders via a communications implant under Hel's right ear. Voice controls many other teams and gives them their orders in a similar fashion, in effect, forming a resistance to the Baileys, with their ultimate goal to retake the Earth's surface. Their final team member is Sarge, whose sister belongs to a cult that regards the Baileys with reverence and willingly sacrifices themselves to them.

Humanity has moved underground and built a complex of elaborate shafts, and tunnels, created by the "shaft builders" to survive the Bailey menace. Cleo wows the 26th-century denizens with her philosophical sayings, many of which come from 20th-century popular culture.

== Cast ==
- Jennifer Sky as Cleo, Cleopatra
- Gina Torres as Helen "Hel"
- Victoria Pratt as Rose "Sarge"
- Patrick Kake as Mauser
- Elizabeth Hawthorne as The Voice
- Danielle Cormack as Raina
- Joel Tobeck as Creegan
- Stacey Edgar as Lara
- Stephen Lovatt as Schrager
- Mark Ferguson as Confessor
- Colin Moy as Quint
- Paolo Rotondo as Porter

== Production ==
The series' theme song is based on Zager and Evans' 1969 hit "In the Year 2525 (Exordium and Terminus)", albeit with altered lyrics.

== Episodes ==
=== Season 1 (2000) ===
No.	Title	Directed by	Written by	Original release date
1	"Quest For Firepower"	Greg Yaitanes	Story by : Rob Tapert & R.J. Stewart; Teleplay by : R.J. Stewart	January 17, 2000
Hel, Sarge, and Horst venture to the surface to test new shields against the Baileys. Upon their successful return, it is revealed that Horst is, in fact, a Betrayer. Although they escape, Sarge (Victoria Pratt) is injured, and thus they seek medical attention – and it is there that they meet Cleopatra, an exotic dancer from the 21st century who was cryogenically frozen after a cosmetic surgery operation went wrong. When the Betrayer catches up to them, Hel and Sarge flee the scene, bringing Cleo with them. Eventually, they face the Betrayer one last time, but with Cleo's help, and through the use of technology stolen from the Bailey at the beginning of the episode, it is defeated.
2	"Creegan"	Greg Yaitanes	Carl Ellsworth	January 24, 2000
Mauser is kidnapped (in pieces) by the villain Creegan, who was responsible for the death of Hel's family. It is up to the team to get Mauser back in one piece before Creegan learns all of their secrets.
3	"Flying Lessons"	Rick Jacobson	Hilary J. Bader	January 31, 2000
While teaching Cleo to fly in the shafts, Hel and Sarge reluctantly get dragged into rescuing a kidnapped girl. The three go to a slave-trader bar and join a high-stakes game to win her back for her father, but to join the game, they have to ante up their own freedom.
4	"Mind Games"	Andrew Merrifield	Adam Armus & Nora Kay Foster	February 7, 2000
A telepathic criminal and former Voice team member named Raina escapes prison to wreak havoc by turning the team against each other.
5	"Home" (Part 1)	Rick Jacobson	R.J. Stewart	February 14, 2000
To discover the whereabouts of a Betrayer factory, the trio stakes out a village of humans who give themselves to the Baileys willingly. Unfortunately, the next human in line to be taken is Lily, Sarge's sister.
6	"Rescue" (Part 2)	Rick Jacobson	Chris Black	February 21, 2000
Cleo and Lily are taken to a Betrayer factory. It is up to Hel and Sarge to rescue them.
7	"Run Cleo Run"	T.J. Scott	T.J. Scott & Kevin Lund	February 28, 2000
It is up to Cleo to save Sarge from a certain death via an explosive collar locked around her neck.
8	"Choices"	Rick Jacobson	Carl Ellsworth	March 6, 2000
The trio is sent on a rescue mission to aid another of Voice's teams trapped in a Christmas-themed Underground level. Hel, Sarge, and Cleo must discover which of the innocent-seeming villagers is the Betrayer before it is too late.
9	"Perceptions"	Wayne Rose	Carl Ellsworth	April 10, 2000
Hel sees her father's ghost, but following him leads to a trap set by Creegan.
10	"Trial And Error"	Andrew Merrifield	Tom O'Neill & George Strayton	April 17, 2000
When it is discovered that Raina can control Betrayers, it is decided to try Raina on the Baileys. While Hel and Sarge take Raina to the surface, Cleo remains behind, in case Raina attempts to betray them.
11	"Double"	Wayne Rose	Chris Black	April 24, 2000
A second Cleo arrives and claims to have escaped from the Baileys. One of the two Cleos must be a Betrayer – but which one?
12	"The Last Stand"	T.J. Scott	Jessica Scott & Mike Wollaeger	May 1, 2000
One of Sarge's heroes, Jake Lawson, calls for help, and Sarge, Hel, and Cleo are dispatched to assist. He is discovered protecting a batch of plutonium from the mutants.
13	"Hel And High Water (Part 1)"	Andrew Merrifield	Chris Black	May 8, 2000
Following a distress signal, the team journey underwater and find a hidden society.
14	"Hel And High Water (Part 2)"	Andrew Merrifield	Carl Ellsworth	May 15, 2000
Sarge's life is threatened, and the team discover a captured Bailey. Cleo performs CPR on Sarge, compressing her chest and gives mouth-to mouth-resuscitation.

=== Season 2 (2000–01) ===
No.	Title	Directed by	Written by	Original release date
15	"The Watch"	Rick Jacobson	Story by : Zoe I. Finkel & Rich Fox; Teleplay by : Carl Ellsworth & Chris Black	October 2, 2000
Sarge is forced to choose between the life of her little sister Lily and that of a reformed petty criminal who is now a leader of the Underground.
16	"Baby Boom"	John Laing	Melissa Blake	October 9, 2000
Hel, Sarge, and Cleopatra race against time to save an infant who has been programmed by the Baileys to detonate in the Underworld.
17	"Brain Drain"	T.J. Scott	T.J. Scott & Kevin Lund	October 16, 2000
The team must deal with a parasitic bio-mech device sent by the Baileys, which steals information from the host's mind and then kills its host.
18	"Mauser's Day Out"	Rick Jacobson	Chris Black	October 30, 2000
Mauser goes ballistic and reverts to his old Betrayer form when Sarge attempts to reprogram him to meet her needs.
19	"Reality Check"	John Laing	Carl Ellsworth	November 6, 2000
Cleo is back in the year 2001 with her boyfriend Johnny, who tells her that her futuristic life with Hel and Sarge was all a dream.
20	"Pod Whisperer"	T.J. Scott	Chris Black	November 13, 2000
The team tries to negotiate peace with the Baileys, with predictable results. They escape from danger, however, using an unexpected new twist - a hovercraft powered by the Bailey pod that Cleo bonded with in the underwater city.
21	"Out Of Body"	Chris Graves	Joel Metzger	November 20, 2000
Raina returns without her telepathic powers, but she wants them back. Cleo, however, has bigger problems - she is a ghost and she wants her body back!
22	"Juggernaut Down"	Mark Beesley	Keith Damron	November 27, 2000
The team tests a device to capture Baileys. When it fails, the Bailey follows the Team into the Underground!
23	"Truth Be Told"	Chris Graves	Part One: Carl Ellsworth; Part Two: Melissa Blake	January 29, 2001
Hel goes AWOL in order to find her father, but can she trust Creegan to help her?
24	"In Your Boots"	Mark Beesley	Jeff Vlaming & Chris Black	February 5, 2001
Creegan is on trial for his crimes, but he pulls a fast one on Hel by switching bodies with her.
25	"The Soldier Who Fell From Grace"	T.J. Scott	Chris Black	February 12, 2001
The team does not know how to react when Voice sends a new team leader to take over, especially when Hel leaves.
26	"No Thanks For The Memories"	Chris Graves	Carl Ellsworth	February 19, 2001
Sarge is accused of murdering several of Marla's guards on her way to killing an important informer from the Black Watch, but she just does not remember what happened.
27	"Noir Or Never"	Garth Maxwell	Jeff Vlaming	February 26, 2001
An agent from the sinister Bureau of Health is assigned to track down a "thaw" named Cleopatra.
28	"The Voice"	Chris Graves	Carl Ellsworth	March 5, 2001
Hel's Team is sent by Voice to take out another Team gone rogue - unfortunately, the other Team has the same instructions about them! They discover that they have been tricked by Creegan, and recapture him. Creegan is slated to die for his crimes, so a Confessor asks him to confess his sins, which he does with astonishing results. Voice orders an all-out attack on the Baileys in a final effort to retake the surface. As this was the last episode, the series ended on a permanent cliffhanger.

== Reception ==
Don Houston of DVD Talk describes the show as fun, with interesting elements and themes, and a kind of sly sense of camp so often missing in syndicated television shows. He said the DVD release gave good value for money, and that the show was, despite its limitations, "a worthwhile bit of entertainment".

== Home media ==
The series was released on Region 1 DVD by Universal Pictures Home Entertainment in the United States on July 19, 2005.
