= Things Will Go My Way =

2004 single by the Calling

Single by the Calling

from the album Two
- B-side: "When It All Falls Down"
- Released: August 16, 2004
- Length: 4:01
- Label: RCA
- Songwriters: Alex Band, Aaron Kamin
- Producers: Clif Magness, Marc Tanner, Aaron Kamin, Alex Band

The Calling singles chronology
"Our Lives" (2004)	"Things Will Go My Way" (2004)	"Anything" (2004)

"Things Will Go My Way" is a song by American rock band the Calling. It was released on August 16, 2004, as the second single from their album Two. It peaked at number 34 on the UK Singles Chart.

== Charts ==
Chart (2004)	Peak position
Italy (FIMI)	49
Netherlands (Single Top 100)	99
Scotland (OCC)	33
UK Singles (Official Charts)	34
