= Two (The Calling album) =

Studio album by the Calling
- Released: June 8, 2004
- Recorded: 2003–2004
- Genres: Alternative rock; post-grunge
- Length: 49:28
- Label: RCA
- Producers: Alex Band; Aaron Kamin; Clif Magness; Marc Tanner

The Calling chronology
Camino Palmero (2001)	Two (2004)	Before The World Turns To Dust (2026)

Singles from Two
- 1. "Our Lives" Released: March 30, 2004; 2. "Things Will Go My Way" Released: August 16, 2004; 3. "Anything" Released: October 25, 2004

Two (stylized as II) is the second studio album by American rock band the Calling, released on June 8, 2004 (lead vocalist Alex Band's 23rd birthday), through RCA Records. The record only features original members Alex Band and guitarist Aaron Kamin, along with several session musicians. Similarly to its predecessor, Two primarily discusses romantic love and relationships.

Despite radio-friendly singles and incessant touring by the band, the album was under-promoted by RCA Records and commercially deemed a sophomore slump compared to Camino Palmero. Critical reception, however, saw a minor incline.

== Reception ==
Professional ratings
Review scores
Source	Rating
AllMusic	1.5/5 stars
Melodic.net	4/5 stars
musicOMH	(favourable)
RTÉ.ie	4/5 stars

"Our Lives" was a minor hit, but the album was not as successful as their debut album Camino Palmero with sales totaling two million worldwide. Johnny Loftus at AllMusic, who gave it one and half out of five stars, said the album is "never adding enough of anything to be memorable or personal", and, that it is "the alternative to having an opinion."

Two didn't do as well in the charts as their debut album, as it only peaked at No. 54 on Billboard 200. In UK it peaked higher than their first album as it reached No. 9.

== Track listing ==
All songs written and composed by Alex Band and Aaron Kamin.

No.	Title	Length
1.	"One by One"	5:07
2.	"Our Lives"	3:55
3.	"Things Will Go My Way"	4:01
4.	"Chasing the Sun"	3:45
5.	"Believing"	3:57
6.	"Anything"	4:05
7.	"If Only"	4:41
8.	"Somebody Out There"	4:08
9.	"Surrender"	5:26
10.	"Dreaming in Red"	4:52
11.	"Your Hope"	5:24

Japan Bonus Tracks
No.	Title	Length
12.	"For You"	3:42

Europe Reissue Bonus Tracks
No.	Title	Length
12.	"For You" (Acoustic)	3:30
13.	"London Calling" (Live)	2:10

== Personnel ==
- Alex Band – arranger, keyboards, programming, vocals, producer
- Paul Bushell – bass
- The Calling – video producer
- Bob Clearmountain – mixing
- Clive Davis – executive producer
- Stephen Ferrera – A&R
- Shaina Fewell – video director
- FJH – art direction
- Josh Freese – drums
- Marc Greene – engineer
- Tal Hertzberg – engineer
- Kurt Iswarienko – photography
- Aaron Kamin – bass, percussion, piano, strings, arranger, programming, producer, engineer, spoken word, group member
- Chris Lord-Alge – mixing
- Clif Magness – producer
- Jamie Muhoberac – piano, strings
- Gary Novak – drums
- Alan Steinberger – keyboards, Hammond organ
- Marc Tanner – producer
- Matthew Welch – photography
- Joe Yannece – mastering

== Charts ==
Chart performance for Two
Chart (2004)	Peak position
Argentine Albums (CAPIF)	20
Australian Albums (ARIA)	96
Austrian Albums (Ö3 Austria)	19
Canadian Albums (Nielsen SoundScan)	95
Dutch Albums (Album Top 100)	66
European Albums (Billboard)	22
French Albums (SNEP)	40
German Albums (Offizielle Top 100)	17
Irish Albums (IRMA)	49
Italian Albums (FIMI)	17
Italian Albums (Musica e Dischi)	18
Japanese Albums (Oricon)	25
Scottish Albums (Official Charts)	7
Swedish Albums (Sverigetopplistan)	51
Swiss Albums (Schweizer Hitparade)	23
UK Albums (Official Charts)	9
UK Rock & Metal Albums (Official Charts)	1
US Billboard 200	54

== Certifications ==
Certifications for Two
Region	Certification	Certified units/sales
Brazil (Pro-Música Brasil)	Gold	50,000^{*}
United Kingdom (BPI)	Silver	60,000^{*}
^{*} Sales figures based on certification alone.
