= Daredevil (film) =

2003 film by Mark Steven Johnson

- Theatrical release poster
- Directed by: Mark Steven Johnson
- Screenplay by: Mark Steven Johnson
- Based on: Daredevil by: Stan Lee; Bill Everett
- Produced by: Arnon Milchan; Gary Foster; Avi Arad
- Starring: Ben Affleck; Jennifer Garner; Michael Clarke Duncan; Colin Farrell; Joe Pantoliano; Jon Favreau; David Keith
- Cinematography: Ericson Core
- Edited by: Dennis Virkler; Armen Minasian
- Music by: Graeme Revell
- Production companies: Regency Enterprises; Marvel Enterprises; New Regency; Horseshoe Bay Productions
- Distributed by: 20th Century Fox
- Release date: February 14, 2003
- Running time: 103 minutes
- Country: United States
- Language: English
- Budget: $78 million
- Box office: $180 million

Daredevil is a 2003 American superhero film written and directed by Mark Steven Johnson, based on the Marvel Comics character of the same name created by Stan Lee and Bill Everett. The film stars Ben Affleck as Matt Murdock, a blind lawyer who fights for justice in the courtroom and on the streets of New York as the masked vigilante Daredevil. Jennifer Garner, Michael Clarke Duncan, Colin Farrell, Joe Pantoliano, Jon Favreau, and David Keith also star in supporting roles.

The film began development in 1997 at 20th Century Fox and in 1999 transferred to Columbia Pictures, before New Regency acquired the rights to the character in 2000. Johnson shot the film primarily in Downtown Los Angeles despite the Hell's Kitchen, Manhattan setting of the film and comics. Rhythm and Hues Studios were hired to handle the film's CGI. Graeme Revell composed the score, which was released on cassette and CD in March 2003, whereas the various artists' soundtrack album, Daredevil: The Album, was released in February.

Daredevil was released in the United States on February 14, 2003, by 20th Century Fox. The film received mixed reviews from critics. It became the second-biggest February release to that time and went on to a worldwide total gross of $180 million against a production budget of $78 million, becoming a box-office success. In 2004, an R-rated director's cut of Daredevil was released, reincorporating approximately 30 minutes of the film, and reviews were more positive than for the theatrical version.

A spin-off film, Elektra, with Garner reprising her role as Elektra Natchios, was released in 2005 to critical and commercial failure. The rights to the character eventually reverted to Marvel, who rebooted him in the Marvel Cinematic Universe (MCU) with Charlie Cox in the role, starting with the Netflix self-titled television series. Garner reprised her role as Elektra in the 2024 film Deadpool & Wolverine.

== Plot ==
In 1982, young Matt Murdock is accidentally blinded by radioactive waste. This is shortly after he witnesses his father, washed-up boxer Jack "The Devil" Murdock, extorting money for local mob boss Eddie Fallon. Despite this, Matt's remaining senses are dramatically enhanced, giving him superhuman agility and sonar-like hearing.

Feeling responsible for his son's accident, Jack is inspired to abandon his life of crime and recommit to his boxing career. This leads to a dramatic comeback. Later, after Fallon reveals that he enabled Jack's comeback by bribing his previous opponents to let him win, he attempts to bribe Jack to throw his next match, then has him murdered once he refuses.

20 years later, an adult Matt works as an attorney in Hell's Kitchen with his friend Franklin "Foggy" Nelson, providing legal representation pro bono to clients whom he believes are actually innocent. By night, he fights crime as the costumed vigilante "Daredevil". Ben Urich, a New York Post reporter who chronicles Daredevil's exploits, attracts attention for a series of articles on "The Kingpin", a shadowy underworld figure who allegedly controls all of the city's organized crime. Unbeknownst to Urich, the Kingpin is actually Wilson Fisk, a brutal mobster who poses as a legitimate businessman.

Matt falls in love with Elektra Natchios, a Greek-American woman skilled in martial arts, unaware that she is the daughter of Fisk's lieutenant Nikolas Natchios. Later, when Nikolas attempts to end his relationship with Fisk, Fisk hires Bullseye, a hitman with preternatural aim, to kill him. Bullseye steals Daredevil's weaponized baton and impales Nikolas with it, killing him and framing Daredevil. Afterward, Urich deduces that Matt is Daredevil after realizing that he disguises his baton as a white cane.

Meanwhile, Bullseye is next assigned by Fisk to kill Elektra. Believing Daredevil to be responsible for her father's murder, she attempts to take revenge by killing him. Elektra tracks him down and challenges him to a fight before incapacitating him by stabbing him through the shoulder. Daredevil protests that he did not kill her father, but she does not listen until she forcibly unmasks him and discovers that he is Matt. Moments later, when Bullseye finds Elektra, Matt is helpless as the assassin seemingly kills her.

Wounded, Matt takes refuge in a church, but Bullseye ambushes him by exploiting his weakness to loud sound. When the police swarm the church, Bullseye reveals that Kingpin killed Matt's father, leaving behind a rose on his body as a calling card. Soon, Matt gains the upper hand and throws him from the bell tower after an NYPD ESU sniper shoots him through both hands, depriving him of his powerful aim.

Determined to avenge Elektra and his father, Matt ambushes Fisk in his office. In the ensuing fight, he ultimately triumphs against Fisk's brute strength by using his sonar hearing to see him after he is drenched in water from a sprinkler head. During their confrontation, Fisk admits that he killed Jack on Fallon's orders and that Elektra's death was nothing but a casualty. As the police arrive to arrest Fisk, he threatens to reveal Daredevil's identity to the world, but Matt points out that no one will ever believe that Daredevil is a blind man.

Some time after Elektra's death, Matt visits the roof of his apartment, where the two of them first kissed. There he unexpectedly finds Elektra's necklace with her name engraved upon it in braille, hinting that she might still be alive. Urich prepares to publish an article revealing Daredevil's identity, but decides against it at the last minute, finally accepting that Daredevil's efforts have improved the city.

Urich exits the New York Post office into the night outside and sees Matt on a roof, saying "Go get 'em, Matt", to which Daredevil nods his head and takes off, leaping off the building to pursue his nightly crimefighting routine. Elsewhere, a heavily bandaged Bullseye awakens in a heavily guarded hospital room and kills a fly with a syringe needle.

== Cast ==
- Ben Affleck as Matt Murdock / Daredevil:
  An attorney-at-law who was blinded as a youth in an accident with bio-waste that drastically heightened his remaining senses and gave him a "sonar-sense", which allowed him to perceive his surroundings, and makes a silent promise with his father to "stick up for the long shots". His father is killed not long after, and at that moment, he vows to seek justice. At night, he becomes a devil-modeled vigilante who takes justice into his hands. Affleck was cast in October 2001. Vin Diesel was considered to portray Daredevil before him, but he opted to take a role in The Fast and the Furious. In a February 2011 interview, Guy Pearce said that he was offered the role but turned it down, stating that "comic-strip stuff isn't really my cup of tea, really." Matt Damon also revealed that he was offered the role. He claimed that he and Ben "loved that comic book but I just didn't quite believe in the script or the director at the time." Edward Norton, Matthew Davis and Colin Farrell (who would play Bullseye), were also considered until Affleck signed. As a fan, Affleck made sure he had read every single issue of Daredevil, commenting that it was about taking what he knew as a fan and faithfully getting it on the screen. Joe Quesada considered it "serendipity in action" that Affleck is the lead role, as when he and Kevin Smith created the Guardian Devil series, they had modeled it on Affleck. Affleck said Daredevil was his favorite comic book as a child, and explained why he took the role by saying "Everybody has that one thing from childhood that they remember and that sticks with them. This story was that for me." Additionally, he said, "I didn't want someone else to do it, because I was afraid that they would go out and do it different from the comic and screw it up."
  - Scott Terra as Young Matt Murdock: Terra was officially announced as a part of the cast in March 2002.
- Jennifer Garner as Elektra Natchios:
  The daughter of billionaire Nikolas Natchios and the love interest of Matt Murdock. At a very young age, she witnessed the murder of her mother, and since then, her father has had her become highly trained in martial arts. For the role of Elektra, many actresses were looked into with considerations including Kate Winslet, Penélope Cruz, Salma Hayek, Natalie Portman, Lucy Liu, Jessica Alba, and Katie Holmes. A short-list was eventually made, giving the choices of Jennifer Garner, Jolene Blalock, Mía Maestro and Rhona Mitra, with Garner finally becoming the actress to land the role while having known in the television series Alias. Garner said of the character, "I think she's strong and cool and beautiful and smart. She'd be a good role model." Garner noted the costume would be different, as Elektra in comics often wears red satin but in the film wears black leather. Garner explained, "[T]he red would never have worked for hiding a harness, and I know this sounds ridiculous, but you have to protect your skin a little bit. They throw me around so much on the rooftop [that] I got cut through the leather, so imagine if I hadn't had anything." Garner would reprise her role in the 2005 film Elektra and later in the 2024 MCU film Deadpool & Wolverine.
- Michael Clarke Duncan as Wilson Fisk / Kingpin:
  By appearance, he is an overweight corporate head that takes the name Wilson Fisk, but in fact, he is the sole person running organized crime, under the moniker of Kingpin. Kingpin is the murderer of Matt's father and the man responsible for the hiring of Bullseye, with the intention of having the Natchios family murdered. Michael Clarke Duncan signed on for the role in January 2002, though he had been attached far earlier. When Duncan was cast, he weighed 290 pounds. He was asked to gain 40 pounds for the role in order to fit the physique of Kingpin. To do this, he would lift weights for 30 minutes a day, and power-lifted with one or two reps a day, as well as eating whatever he wanted. Duncan's biggest concern was that he was black, while Kingpin has always been portrayed as white. Also, Duncan provided the voice for Kingpin in Spider-Man: The New Animated Series. He spoke on the fan's loyalty to the source material by saying "they watch movies to say, 'Hey, that's not like the comic book.' But I want them to get past that and just see the movie for what it is and see me for what I am—an actor."
- Colin Farrell as Bullseye:
  An assassin with perfect accuracy and deep-rooted pride of it who is hired by Kingpin to kill Nikolas and Elektra Natchios, but when Daredevil gets involved and causes him to miss his target, he makes it his own personal vendetta to take Daredevil down. Farrell was attached to the role in December 2001. Mark Steven Johnson credits Joe Quesada with talking him out of using the traditional Bullseye costume for the film, and Farrell was encouraged to keep his Irish accent as this version of Bullseye is from Ireland. Farrell had to read Frank Miller's Daredevil comics to understand Bullseye "because the expression on the character's faces in the comic books, and just the way they move sometimes, and the exaggerations of the character I'm playing [...] he's so over-the-top that you do draw from that. But it's not exactly a character you can do method acting for ... you know, running around New York killing people with paper clips."
- Joe Pantoliano as Ben Urich:
  An investigative journalist whose articles notably relate to Daredevil, and the Kingpin. During the film, he goes on to uncover a lot of information about the two. Pantoliano was cast in March 2002. Urich works for the New York Post rather than the fictional Daily Bugle as in the comics, because the film rights to the Bugle were held by Sony Pictures at that time due to it being associated with Spider-Man.
- Jon Favreau as Franklin "Foggy" Nelson:
  Matt Murdock's legal partner and best friend, he is also used as a form of comic relief. Seth Rogen auditioned for the role, but he was rejected as he was deemed "too young" for the role. Favreau joined the cast in February 2002.
- David Keith as Jack Murdock:
  Father of Matt Murdock and a boxer, he is murdered by the Kingpin when he does not take a fall for a fight. Keith was officially announced as a part of the cast in March 2002.
- Leland Orser as Wesley Owen Welch:
  The number two of Wilson Fisk, but he does not like to be involved in the activities of the Kingpin.
- Ellen Pompeo as Karen Page:
  The secretary at Matt Murdock and Franklin Nelson's law firm.
- Lennie Loftin as Detective Nick Manolis:
  A NYPD cop who considers Daredevil an urban legend.
- Erick Avari as Nikolas Natchios:
  The father of Elektra, who is murdered by Bullseye on behalf of the Kingpin.
- Derrick O'Connor as Father Everett:
  A priest of Matt Murdock's local church, where he sometimes goes to find solace.

Stan Lee, Frank Miller, and Kevin Smith, each notable for their work on the Daredevil comics, also have cameo roles throughout the film with the latter playing a forensics assistant named "Jack Kirby". Paul Ben-Victor portrays Jose Quesada, a criminal Daredevil hunts who is named after Joe Quesada. Mark Margolis has an uncredited role as Eddie Fallon, a mobster who once employed Fisk as a hitman. Kane Hodder makes an appearance as Fallon's bodyguard. Claudine Farrell, Colin Farrell's sister and personal assistant on the film, has an uncredited vocal cameo as Heather Glenn on Matt Murdock's answering machine and cameos in the pub scene. Josie DiVincenzo portrays Josie, a character from the comics who is the owner of Josie's Bar, a regular hangout in Hell's Kitchen. The director's cut version also features Coolio as Dante Jackson and features Jude Ciccolella in a subplot removed from the theatrical version. Tanoai Reed appears uncredited as a thug in Josie's Bar.

== Production ==
=== Development ===
In 1997, 20th Century Fox optioned the film rights of the character Daredevil from Marvel Comics, and Chris Columbus was set to direct the film adaptation. In 1998, Marvel was facing bankruptcy. During this time, 20th Century Fox allowed the option to expire, so Disney, which later went on to purchase Marvel's rights to all of its property in 2012, began negotiations in order to acquire the rights. In 1999, the negotiations failed to work out, so Marvel set the project up with Columbia Pictures. During this time, Columbus and Carlo Carlei co-wrote a script together, before Mark Steven Johnson got signed to write the screenplay. By 2000, Columbia decided to cancel the project, as the two companies reportedly could not come to an agreement over digital rights.

New Regency entered negotiations with a more satisfying offer, attaining the character rights from Marvel in 2000 to produce the film, with 20th Century Fox handling the distribution. Mark Steven Johnson was rehired and his script was turned in during 2001, which was praised by Ain't It Cool News' Harry Knowles. Before shooting, producer Gary Foster said that, in comparison to other comic book-based films before it, the film would be "more character-driven ... darker ... edgier," while Marvel Studios executive Kevin Feige felt the script was one of the strongest Marvel had received. 20th Century Fox raised the budget for the film, after the success of Sam Raimi's Spider-Man.

=== Filming ===
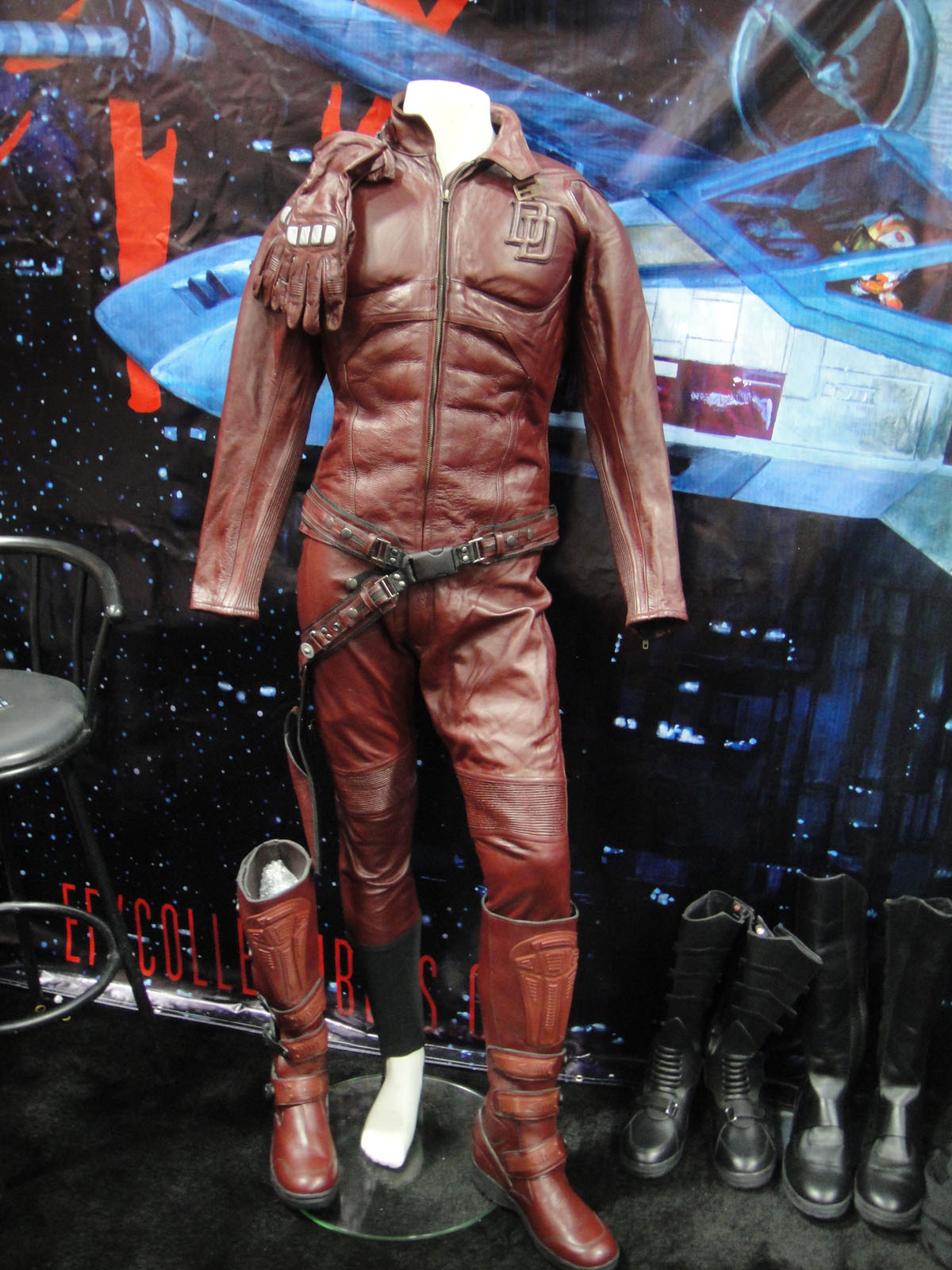
The Daredevil costume used in the film

Filming began in March 2002. Fox wanted to start filming in Canada in order to save money. This plan was contended by Johnson, and the film's cinematographer, Ericson Core, after they found a preferred area for shooting around downtown Los Angeles' Arcade Building. Core noted that the appeal came from the "beautiful, old brick buildings and great rooftops," which they felt was perfect for a depiction of Hell's Kitchen, Manhattan, in comparison to the studio's choice, where the filming would be done in Montreal or Vancouver. Due to their insistence, coupled with Ben Affleck's disinterest in filming in Canada (after having filmed there for his previous film, The Sum of All Fears), they were able to change the studio's mind.

A side-by-side view of the scene from the Guardian Devil graphic novel, and the film. Several scenes were taken shot-for-shot from comic books.

When the look of the film was being decided, Mark Steven Johnson opted to use direct scenes from the Daredevil comics. Joe Quesada's artistic take in Guardian Devil (Daredevil vol. 2, #1–#8) was an influence on the film, with Johnson noting that they would "literally take out a scene from the comic book that Joe did [...] Here's Daredevil on the cross, you know, it's that scene from 'Guardian Devil'. You just shoot that." Throughout the film, Ben Affleck had to wear "cataract milky-blue" contacts, which would effectively make him blind. This was considered great by Johnson, as it would aid his performance.

The sound plays an integral part in the film, as the superhero relies on it to form his 'sonar sense'. Post-production sound was done by supervising sound editor John Larsen and sound designer Steve Boeddeker, and is heard taking place immediately after Matt's optic nerve is seen mutating. The mutating of the nerve was done by Rhythm and Hues Studios, who also worked on the sonar-sense, which became referred to as the "shadow world". The shadow world was made using just CGI except in a scene where Elektra and Matt Murdock are in the rain, which was done using CGI over film.

== Music ==
The soundtrack to the film, Daredevil: The Album, was released in February 2003. It features songs from various artists, including "Bring Me to Life" and "My Immortal" by Evanescence, "Won't Back Down" by Fuel, and "For You" by the Calling.

The score to Daredevil was written by Graeme Revell, and released on March 4, 2003. He was attracted to the focus of "human-ness" on Daredevil, torn emotionally and physically by his superhero status. Avi Arad asked Revell to concentrate more on the emotions of Daredevil and Elektra, while Mark Steven Johnson wanted to stay clear of any gothic and action movie clichés. Revell tried to avoid too much individual motifs, but some characters would have an identifiable sound, like Bullseye would have guitar undertones, while Kingpin would have bass beats. Guitarist Mike Einziger of Incubus collaborated with Revell for any additional rock elements. Revell described the director as "positive" and "responsive" when it came to experimenting (as opposed to feeling "locked in a box of preconceptions"), which he felt led to "cool stuff". Varèse Sarabande put together the score record.

== Release ==
=== Marketing ===
Aside from expected TV commercials during such TV hits as Friends and Law & Order, as well as one in the second quarter of Super Bowl XXXVII, there was also a tie-in with Kraft, an in-store promotion at Wal-Mart, a marketing campaign with Hamilton Watch Company, who designed the watch Matt wears in the film, and a weeklong Daredevil segment on Entertainment Tonight. As part of an online form of marketing, a viral e-mail drive was started, where participants would be entered in a contest where they could win prizes such as Daredevil T-shirts, Game Boy Advance games, and cufflinks. To enter the drawing, the user had to book tickets for the film online, then pass an email on to someone else. The idea was to encourage online ticket booking, which at the time was seen as a growing trend.

=== Censorship ===
Due to the film's violent scenes, the Film Censorship Board of Malaysia banned Daredevil in that country. 20th Century Fox unsuccessfully appealed to Malaysia's censorship board to change its decision, hoping to release the film in Malaysia on February 27, 2003. The deputy prime minister told the press films were banned if they contained what the board felt was "excessive violence and sexual material or elements which can create chaos in the community".

=== Director's Cut ===
A director's cut of the film was announced for a spring 2004 DVD release. This version contained new additions like previously unseen footage and a removed subplot, and was to be a bit darker with an R rating. The film, released in 2.35:1 widescreen format, was released with DTS and Dolby Digital sound. The new version of the film has newly recorded commentary to accompany it, featuring Mark Steven Johnson and Avi Arad. A "Making of Director's Cut" featurette also accompanied the film. The release date of the DVD was later pushed back to November 30, 2004. On September 30, 2008, the director's cut was released on Blu-ray. The DVD release of the director's cut removed the bonus material included on the theatrical cut's DVD release, but that content was restored for the Blu-ray release (although the Blu-ray release only contains the director's cut).

One of the biggest changes to the film was the addition of a subplot involving a drug addict played by Coolio, who was charged with killing a prostitute informant who was feeding Urich info on the Kingpin. This subplot is missing from the theatrical version of the film, but is present in the novelization by Greg Cox, published in 2003.

Executive producer Kevin Feige commented on this version of the film, believing "the people who had other opinions [of Daredevil] will be won over by this new version." Reviewer Danny Graydon of Empire called it a "considerable improvement on the original version," notably preferring the more violent undertones, a lesser focus on the romance, and the equal focus of Daredevil and his lawyer alias Matt Murdock and the subplot involving Coolio. Some critics continued to feel Affleck was unsuitable as Daredevil and that Duncan portrayed the Kingpin in an over-the-top manner. IGN's Jeff Otto and Andy Patrizio deemed this version an improvement over the original: They felt this version was more loyal to the Frank Miller feel of the Daredevil world, with more focus on themes such as Murdock's struggle with his Catholic upbringing. On the whole, they felt the film would be far more pleasing to fans and overall better than the theatrical release. Comic-book enthusiasts have gauged the director's cut as one of the better recuts of a superhero film.

== Reception ==
=== Box office ===
The film opened theatrically on February 14, 2003, on 3,471 screens in North America and took first place in its opening weekend, grossing $40.3 million. At the time, it became the second-biggest February release, behind Hannibal. By the second weekend the film saw a 55.1% decline in takings but managed to maintain the number one spot, beating new release Old School by $639,093. By the third weekend, Daredevil saw a further 38.5% drop in sales, and so fell to third place at the box office. The film grossed $103 million in North America, and $77 million in the rest of the world, totalling the film's worldwide takings at just $180 million, grossing over double its budget of $78 million. Avi Arad addressed the top spot success by saying "we are five for five with record-breaking box office successes [with Blade, X-Men, Blade II then Spider-Man] and have two more Marvel releases slated for this summer [which are X2: X-Men United and Hulk]. It's a testament to the broad appeal of these characters before mainstream audiences outside of the core comic fans. These superheroes have been successful within the Marvel pantheon for decades; it only makes sense that their translations to the big screen are just as fruitful."

=== Critical response ===
On review aggregation website Rotten Tomatoes 42% of critics gave the film positive feedback, based on 229 reviews, with an average rating of 5.2/10. The critical consensus reads, "While Ben Affleck fits the role and the story is sporadically interesting, Daredevil is ultimately a dull, brooding origin story that fails to bring anything new to the genre." On the website Metacritic the film has an average score of 42 out of 100, based on 35 critics, indicating "mixed or average" reviews. Audiences polled by CinemaScore gave the film an average grade of "B" on an A+ to F scale.

Roger Ebert of the Chicago Sun-Times gave Daredevil three out of four stars, saying it was “actually pretty good” despite some genre clichés. He praised the visuals and said Affleck and Garner offered restrained and realistic performances, while also noting Michael Clarke Duncan was a menacing villain. The Houston Chronicle's Bruce Westbrook considered it "the best Marvel movie to date, it's as well-written and character-driven as some of today's Oscar contenders, and its story doesn't stall with hollow flamboyance." The Austin Chronicle's Kimberly Jones praised the film, the actors, and felt that though an unproven director, "Johnson has just signed his meal ticket with this marriage of big brains, big brawn, and–most happily–big heart."

Kim Newman of Empire magazine gave the film four out of five stars, and felt people "will like the characters more than the film," before adding that there are enough strong moments to guarantee a good viewing. The Guardian's Peter Bradshaw stated that the film had "unconvincing touches" but was more enjoyable than Spider-Man and as dark as Tim Burton's Batman. BBC film critic Nev Pierce believed the film had spectacular set-pieces, but felt there was no strong narrative arc to keep the viewer interested. The Wall Street Journal's Joe Morgenstern considered the film to be neither original nor great but felt it maintained "many grace notes and interesting oddities." The Globe and Mail's Rick Groen said the film was "not woeful, not wonderful, merely watchable." The Philadelphia Inquirer's Steven Rea thought the film brought a variance of humor and violence, but felt it didn't work as well as it could have. James Berardinelli felt it was merely a satisfactory superhero film. TV Guide's Frank Lovece said Daredevil "makes clear that superhero films are the next evolutionary generation of action movies: Now that Schwarzenegger-styled heroes have upped the action ante as far as the human body can go and remain even marginally believable, it's up to superheroes ... to take it further." He also felt it was "a movie for grown-ups, not kids."

Negative reviews included that of The New York Times' Elvis Mitchell, who said the film was "second-rate and ordinary," while Variety's Todd McCarthy considered it "a pretender in the realm of bona-fide superheroes." Entertainment Weekly's Owen Gleiberman gave the film a "C−", criticizing the story as "sloppy" and "slipshod", saying, "Daredevil is the sort of half-assed, visually-lackadaisical potboiler that makes you rue the day that comic-book franchises ever took over Hollywood." Time Out's Trevor Johnston praised Ben Affleck, feeling he "persuades us of the pain of sightlessness and supersensitive hearing," but also felt writer/director Johnson's construction fails all involved in the film. Slate's David Edelstein wrote that the film was derivative of Batman, but concluded by saying "that's not so bad: The movie looks best when it looks like other, better movies." The Chicago Tribune's Michael Wilmington thought the film grabs the attention, but felt it does not reward it. Character co-creator Stan Lee himself said, "[T]hey just wrote the whole thing wrong. They made him too tragic." Ben Affleck won the Golden Raspberry Award for Worst Actor for his work in the movie along with Gigli and Paycheck.

Affleck himself disliked and disowned the film, and said that it inspired him to take on the role of Batman in Batman v Superman: Dawn of Justice. "That's the movie I want to do. I want to be a part of that [Batman v Superman]. Part of it was I wanted for once to get one of these movies and do it right—to do a good version. I hate Daredevil so much." Affleck also called the film "kinda silly".

For the 20th anniversary of the film, Mark Steven Johnson said:

"Looking back on it, one of the mistakes I made with the film was wanting to put everything in! I wanted to do Daredevil's origin story, and I wanted to do the Elektra Saga, and I wanted to introduce Bullseye and Foggy. I wanted everything to be in there, but the film could only support so much. And then when you're told to cut a half-hour out and make it more of a love story, things start to feel rushed and not quite right. It's a fan thing: when you love something so much, you want to tell it all."

== Video game ==
The Game Boy Advance Daredevil game was released on February 14, 2003, and was created by Encore, a subsidiary of Navarre Corporation. Another game, titled Daredevil: The Man Without Fear, was in development for PS2, Xbox and PC before being cancelled in 2004.

== Franchise ==
=== Spin-off ===
During 2004, Ben Affleck shot a cameo role for the spin-off film, Elektra, at the request of Daredevil co-star Jennifer Garner, but the scene was ultimately cut from the film.

=== Cancelled sequel ===
In October 2004, Affleck stated he would only return in the lead role if Fox would renegotiate to tell the darker stories of Daredevil, and showed interest in the Guardian Devil graphic novel, as well as the Born Again storyline. In November 2006, Affleck stated that he would never reprise the role, having felt "by playing a superhero in Daredevil, I have inoculated myself from ever playing another superhero ... Wearing a costume was a source of humiliation for me and something I wouldn't want to do again soon." Despite this, Affleck would portray Batman in the DC Extended Universe films Batman v Superman: Dawn of Justice, Suicide Squad (both 2016), Justice League (2017) and its director's cut (2021), and The Flash (2023).

In July 2006, Michael Clarke Duncan showed interest in returning for the role of the Kingpin, but stated that he would not be willing to gain weight as he felt "comfortable" being down to 270 pounds. He jokingly showed willingness to change his mind if he was offered $20 million. Duncan suggested that the character is portrayed as having been training a lot in jail in order to become faster in combat against Daredevil, also working as a way to fit his weight loss into the story. Duncan would later go on to reprise his role as the Kingpin in an episode of the animated series Spider-Man: The New Animated Series. He has also moved on to appear in other comic book films like the 2005 crime film Sin City as Manute and the 2011 DC superhero film Green Lantern as Kilowog. Duncan died on September 3, 2012.

=== Marvel Cinematic Universe ===
In 2004, Feige had stated on potential future Daredevil films, "There are many more stories to be told with old Hornhead, and we'd love to tell them someday." Avi Arad has also said that a sequel will begin development once the rights go from 20th Century Fox to Marvel Studios. Director Mark Steven Johnson showed interest in returning to direct with the Born Again storyline, as well as suggesting Mr. Fear as a possible villain. as Johnson liked the concept of the "Man Without Fear" taking on a villain who embodies fear itself.

In July 2008, Jason Statham expressed interest in appearing as Daredevil in the future. Statham requested, "Just give me the chance, I would love to be Daredevil." Frank Miller commented in agreement, "I think he should be Daredevil too." In October 2008, 20th Century Fox executive Tom Rothman said "a Daredevil reboot is something we are thinking very seriously about." Rothman added that "what it really needs is, it needs a visionary at the level that Chris Nolan was. It needs someone, it needs a director, honestly, who has a genuine vision." By February 2010, 20th Century Fox and New Regency were looking to develop the reboot with News Corp., with Peter Chernin producing and David Scarpa writing the script. On March 15, 2011, it was announced that filmmaker David Slade would be directing the reboot, but he later had to drop out due to other obligations. Fringe writer and producer Brad Caleb Kane was hired to pen the Slade-directed film.

Later, it was announced that in the event that a sequel or reboot had not started filming by October 10, 2012, the rights to the Daredevil franchise would revert from Fox back to Marvel. In early August 2012, Fox scrambled to find a replacement for David Slade. The studio briefly met with Joe Carnahan, but Carnahan said that his pitch, Daredevil as a hard-boiled '70s-style thriller, had gone up in smoke. Several sources commented that Fox had given up on the reboot, and were prepared to let the rights revert to Marvel and their parent company, The Walt Disney Company. On April 23, 2013, Kevin Feige confirmed that the rights for Daredevil returned to Marvel Studios and Disney, opening the possibility of including the character into the Marvel Cinematic Universe. That speculation was confirmed with the announcement of an original Netflix Daredevil television series, which premiered on the streaming service in April 2015, with English actor Charlie Cox in the title role. Following the cancellation of Daredevil in 2018, Cox and D'Onofrio reprised their roles for Marvel Studios projects starting in 2021. A new Daredevil series entered development in early 2022, with Corman and Ord attached as head writers by May. A revival and continuation of the 2015 TV series, the first season of Daredevil: Born Again premiered in March 2025, sharing continuity with the films and television series of the Marvel Cinematic Universe. The second season premiered in March 2026 and consists of eight episodes.

Garner reprised the role of Elektra in the MCU film Deadpool & Wolverine (2024), which deals with the concept of the multiverse. A line in the film mentions that Daredevil was killed by Cassandra Nova. While Affleck’s Daredevil appears in concept art for the film it was never explicitly stated to be that version of the character that was mentioned.
