= For You (The Calling song) =

2003 single by the Calling

Single by the Calling

from the album Daredevil: The Album
- Released: February 10, 2003
- Length: 3:42
- Label: Wind-up; Epic
- Songwriters: Alex Band; Aaron Kamin
- Producers: Marc Tanner; Aaron Kamin; Alex Band

The Calling singles chronology
"Could It Be Any Harder" (2002)	"For You" (2003)	"Our Lives" (2004)

"For You" is a song by American rock band the Calling that was recorded for the soundtrack to American superhero film Daredevil (2003). It was also featured in the film's closing credits. "For You" was released as a single in February 2003 and reached the top 50 in Italy and New Zealand.

== Charts ==
Chart (2003)	Peak position
Germany (GfK)	80
Italy (FIMI)	19
Italy (Musica e dischi)	21
New Zealand (Recorded Music NZ)	45
Switzerland (Schweizer Hitparade)	91
