= Adrienne (song) =

2002 single by the Calling

Single by the Calling

from the album Camino Palmero
- B-side: "The One"; "Lost"
- Released: April 15, 2002
- Genre: Post-grunge
- Length: 4:31
- Label: RCA
- Songwriters: Aaron Kamin; Alex Band
- Producer: Marc Tanner

The Calling singles chronology
"Wherever You Will Go" (2001)	"Adrienne" (2002)	"Could It Be Any Harder" (2002)

Music video
- "Adrienne" on YouTube

"Adrienne" is the second single from American rock band the Calling's debut album, Camino Palmero (2001). When Aaron Kamin and Alex Band wrote the song, they both had girls in mind, but according to the band, they changed the name in the song to "Adrienne" because they did not want to get sued. Released on April 15, 2002, "Adrienne" reached number 16 on the US Billboard Bubbling Under Hot 100 and was a minor hit in Europe and Australia.

== Music video ==
In the music video, the band members perform outside while a group of people stand in line taking turns "singing" a duet with Alex Band. At the end of the video, a girl goes up and falls, and everyone else in line falls like dominoes.

== Track listings ==
UK CD and cassette single

1. "Adrienne" (radio mix) – 3:59
2. "The One" – 3:46
3. "Adrienne" (acoustic version) – 3:47

European CD single 1

1. "Adrienne" (radio edit) – 3:59
2. "Adrienne" (video) – 4:30

European CD single 2

1. "Adrienne" (radio edit) – 3:59
2. "Adrienne" (acoustic version) – 3:47
3. "Adrienne" (video) – 4:30

European maxi-CD single

1. "Adrienne" (radio edit) – 3:59
2. "Adrienne" (acoustic version) – 4:42
3. "The One" – 3:46
4. "Adrienne" (video) – 4:30

Australian CD single

1. "Adrienne" (radio edit) – 3:59
2. "Adrienne" (adult mix) – 3:59
3. "Lost" – 3:48
4. "Adrienne" (acoustic version) – 4:42

== Charts ==
=== Weekly charts ===
Chart (2002–2003)	Peak position
Australia (ARIA)	60
Austria (Ö3 Austria Top 40)	50
Belgium (Ultratip Bubbling Under Flanders)	14
Belgium (Ultratip Bubbling Under Wallonia)	11
Europe (Eurochart Hot 100)	59
European Radio Top 50 (Music & Media)	38
Germany (GfK)	68
Ireland (IRMA)	32
Italy (FIMI)	21
Italy (Musica e dischi)	25
Latvia (Latvijas Top 40)	31
Netherlands (Dutch Top 40)	24
Netherlands (Single Top 100)	81
Poland Airplay (PiF PaF)	3
Scottish Singles Sales (Official Charts)	24
Spain Airplay (Top 40 Radio)	34
Switzerland (Schweizer Hitparade)	64
UK Singles (Official Charts)	18
UK Airplay (Music Week)	25
UK Rock & Metal (Official Charts)	2
US Bubbling Under Hot 100 (Billboard)	16
US Adult Pop Airplay (Billboard)	22
US Pop Airplay (Billboard)	34

=== Year-end charts ===
Chart (2002)	Position
US Adult Top 40 (Billboard)	66

== Release history ==
Region	Date	Format(s)	Label(s)	Ref.
United States	April 15, 2002	Contemporary hit; hot AC; alternative; triple A radio	RCA	
Australia	July 15, 2002	CD	RCA	
Denmark	September 16, 2002	CD	RCA; BMG	
United Kingdom	October 21, 2002	CD; cassette	RCA; BMG	
