= Our Lives (song) =

2004 single by the Calling

Single by the Calling

from the album Two
- B-side: "For You" (acoustic); "London Calling" (live)
- Released: March 29, 2004
- Genre: Alternative rock; pop rock
- Length: 3:55
- Label: RCA
- Songwriters: Aaron Kamin; Alex Band
- Producers: Clif Magness; Marc Tanner; Aaron Kamin; Alex Band

The Calling singles chronology
"For You" (2003)	"Our Lives" (2004)	"Things Will Go My Way" (2004)

Music video
- "Our Lives" on YouTube

"Our Lives" is a song by American rock band the Calling. It was released on March 29, 2004, as the lead single from their second studio album, Two (2004). The single peaked at number 13 on the UK Singles Chart, reached number two on the UK Rock Singles Chart, and entered the top 20 in Denmark and Italy. It was used as the theme song to the short lived series Clubhouse on CBS.

== Track listings ==
UK CD1

1. "Our Lives" – 3:56
2. "For You" (acoustic) – 3:27
3. "London Calling" (live) – 2:09
4. "Our Lives" (video) – 3:50

UK CD2 and European CD single

1. "Our Lives" – 3:56
2. "London Calling" (live) – 2:09

Australian CD single

1. "Our Lives" – 3:56
2. "For You" (acoustic) – 3:27
3. "London Calling" (live) – 2:09

== Charts ==
=== Weekly charts ===
Chart (2004)	Peak position
Australia (ARIA)	63
Austria (Ö3 Austria Top 40)	72
Denmark (Tracklisten)	17
France (SNEP)	65
Germany (GfK)	63
Ireland (IRMA)	38
Italy (FIMI)	11
Italy (Musica e dischi)	14
Netherlands (Dutch Top 40)	32
Netherlands (Single Top 100)	65
Scottish Singles Sales (Official Charts)	10
Sweden (Sverigetopplistan)	50
Switzerland (Schweizer Hitparade)	72
UK Singles (Official Charts)	13
UK Airplay (Music Week)	42
UK Rock & Metal (Official Charts)	2
US Bubbling Under Hot 100 Singles (Billboard)	25
US Adult Top 40 (Billboard)	16

=== Year-end charts ===
Chart (2004)	Position
Brazil (Crowley)	70

== Release history ==
Region	Date	Format(s)	Label(s)	Ref.
United States	March 29, 2004	Hot adult contemporary radio	RCA	
United States	April 19, 2004	Contemporary hit radio	RCA	
Denmark	May 3, 2004	CD	RCA; BMG	
United Kingdom	May 17, 2004	CD	RCA; BMG	
Australia	May 24, 2004	CD	RCA; BMG	
