= Wherever You Will Go =

2001 single by the Calling

Single by the Calling

from the album Camino Palmero
- B-side: "Adrienne"
- Released: May 22, 2001
- Studio: Cherokee (Hollywood, California)
- Genre: Post-grunge; alternative rock
- Length: 3:29
- Label: RCA; BMG
- Songwriters: Alex Band; Aaron Kamin
- Producer: Marc Tanner

The Calling singles chronology
"Wherever You Will Go" (2001)	"Adrienne" (2002)

Music video
- "Wherever You Will Go" on YouTube

"Wherever You Will Go" is a song by American band the Calling. It was released on May 22, 2001, as the first single from their debut studio album, Camino Palmero (2001). It remains their most successful hit, peaking at number five on the US Billboard Hot 100 and topping the Adult Top 40 for 23 weeks, tied for the third-longest-running number one in the chart's history, along with Taylor Swift's "Cruel Summer" (2023). Outside the United States, the song topped the music charts of Italy, New Zealand, and Poland, reached number three in the United Kingdom, peaked at number five in Australia, and became a top-10 hit in several European countries.

== Background and writing ==
Songwriter Aaron Kamin talked about "Wherever You Will Go" in a radio interview. He said: "At the time my grandmother's best friend had passed away and she left behind a husband of 50 or more years and I was at the funeral and afterwards I just started thinking of what it would be like to be him and have your whole life change so dramatically and not for the best in a matter of moments. Somebody that you live and grow with and are one with, just to be gone, is crazy and I figured all he ever thinks about probably is finding a way to get back to her or be with her or make sure she's alright or something like that. That was the sentiment behind that."

According to Kamin, "Wherever You Will Go" was overlooked until it was heard by Kathy Nelson, who was president of film music for the Walt Disney Motion Picture Group at the time. "Kathy apparently said, 'That song is a fucking monster. I need it in this movie I'm working on,'" Kamin told Billboard. The film in question was Coyote Ugly (2000). Lead singer Alex Band also said that after the track's inclusion in Coyote Ugly, Ron Fair, manager of A&R at RCA Records, invited the Calling to make an album.

== Music video ==
Two videos were shot for this song. The first was set in Mexico. The other version, which is more popular, was directed by Gregory Dark, and has the band performing in the concrete channel of the Los Angeles River, while a teenage soap opera plays in the foreground. A teenage girl gets her boyfriend's name tattooed on her shoulder, but when she finds him cheating with another girl, she flies into a rage, destroying most of his belongings. At the end of the video, she is seen with a new boyfriend (male model and then-fledgling actor Drew Fuller) with a flower tattoo covering the name, as her jealous ex watches her from his car. The group's lead singer, Alex Band, can also be seen in some scenes singing in the foreground of some of the storyline, such as when the girl is seen destroying the belongings.

== Track listings ==
US 7-inch single

A. "Wherever You Will Go" – 3:28
B. "Adrienne" – 4:30

UK CD single

1. "Wherever You Will Go" (radio edit) – 3:28
2. "Lost" – 3:48
3. "Wherever You Will Go" (acoustic) – 3:24
4. "Wherever You Will Go" (director's cut video) – 3:26

UK cassette single

1. "Wherever You Will Go" – 3:28
2. "Lost" – 3:48
3. "Wherever You Will Go" (acoustic) – 3:24

European CD single

1. "Wherever You Will Go" (radio edit) – 3:28
2. "Lost" – 3:48

European limited-edition maxi-CD single

1. "Wherever You Will Go" – 3:28
2. "Nothing's Changed" – 4:04
3. "Lost" – 3:48
4. "Wherever You Will Go" (video) – 3:26

Australian CD single

1. "Wherever You Will Go" – 3:28
2. "Nothing's Changed" – 4:04
3. "Lost" – 3:48

== Credits and personnel ==
Credits are adapted from the UK CD single liner notes.

Studios

- Recorded at Cherokee Studios (Hollywood, California)
- Mixed at Image Recording (Hollywood, California)

Personnel

- Alex Band – writing, vocals
- Aaron Kamin – writing, guitar, sitar, mandolin, loops, percussion
- Matt Laug – drums, percussion
- Bob Glaub – bass
- Ron Fair – synth strings
- Satnam Ramgotra – tabla, percussion
- Paul Mirkovich – additional keys
- Marc Tanner – production
- David Thoener – recording
- Marc Greene – recording
- Tiago Becker – recording assistance
- Valente Torres – recording assistance
- Chris Lord-Alge – mixing
- Matt Silva – mixing assistance

== Charts ==
=== Weekly charts ===
2001–2002 weekly chart performance for "Wherever You Will Go"
Chart (2001–2002)	Peak position
Australia (ARIA)	5
Austria (Ö3 Austria Top 40)	8
Belgium (Ultratop 50 Flanders)	29
Belgium (Ultratop 50 Wallonia)	18
Canada (Nielsen SoundScan)	20
Canada CHR (Nielsen BDS)	4
Colombia (Notimex)	3
Denmark (Tracklisten)	7
Denmark Airplay (Tracklisten)	14
Europe (Eurochart Hot 100)	6
Europe (European Hit Radio)	2
France (SNEP)	7
France Airplay (SNEP)	5
Germany (GfK)	16
Greece (IFPI)	18
Ireland (IRMA)	8
Italy (FIMI)	1
Italy (Musica e dischi)	4
Latvia (Latvijas Top 40)	6
Netherlands (Dutch Top 40)	14
Netherlands (Single Top 100)	31
Netherlands Airplay (Music & Media)	13
New Zealand (Recorded Music NZ)	1
Norway (VG-lista)	4
Poland Airplay (Nielsen Music Control)	1
Romania (Romanian Top 100)	10
Scottish Singles Sales (Official Charts)	4
Spain Airplay (Top 40 Radio)	33
Sweden (Sverigetopplistan)	14
Switzerland (Schweizer Hitparade)	7
UK Singles (Official Charts)	3
UK Airplay (Music Week)	14
US Billboard Hot 100	5
US Adult Alternative Airplay (Billboard)	6
US Adult Contemporary (Billboard)	21
US Adult Pop Airplay (Billboard)	1
US Alternative Airplay (Billboard)	14
US Mainstream Rock (Billboard)	37
US Pop Airplay (Billboard)	4
US Top 40 Tracks (Billboard)	3

2011 weekly chart performance for "Wherever You Will Go"
Chart (2011)	Peak position
Ireland (IRMA)	42
Scottish Singles Sales (Official Charts)	15
UK Singles (Official Charts)	16

2025 weekly chart performance for "Wherever You Will Go"
Chart (2025)	Peak position
Philippines (Philippines Hot 100)	81

=== Year-end charts ===
2001 year-end chart performance for "Wherever You Will Go"
Chart (2001)	Position
US Adult Top 40 (Billboard)	53
US Modern Rock Tracks (Billboard)	73

2002 year-end chart performance for "Wherever You Will Go"
Chart (2002)	Position
Australia (ARIA)	45
Belgium (Ultratop 50 Wallonia)	69
Brazil (Crowley)	5
Canada (Nielsen SoundScan)	119
Canada Radio (Nielsen BDS)	3
Europe (Eurochart Hot 100)	42
Europe (European Hit Radio)	10
France (SNEP)	56
Ireland (IRMA)	52
Italy (FIMI)	9
Latvia (Latvijas Top 50)	52
Netherlands (Dutch Top 40)	96
New Zealand (RIANZ)	7
Sweden (Hitlistan)	60
Switzerland (Schweizer Hitparade)	35
Taiwan (Hito Radio)	90
UK Singles (OCC)	59
UK Airplay (Music Week)	39
US Billboard Hot 100	5
US Adult Contemporary (Billboard)	39
US Adult Top 40 (Billboard)	1
US Mainstream Top 40 (Billboard)	4
US Top 40 Tracks (Billboard)	3
US Triple-A (Billboard)	23

2003 year-end chart performance for "Wherever You Will Go"
Chart (2003)	Position
US Adult Top 40 (Billboard)	64

2011 year-end chart performance for "Wherever You Will Go"
Chart (2011)	Position
UK Singles (OCC)	164

== Certifications ==
Certifications and sales for "Wherever You Will Go"
Region	Certification	Certified units/sales
Australia (ARIA)	Platinum	70,000^{^}
Denmark (IFPI Danmark)	Platinum	90,000^{‡}
Germany (BVMI)	Gold	250,000^{‡}
Italy (FIMI)	Platinum	50,000^{‡}
New Zealand (RMNZ)	3× Platinum	90,000^{‡}
Spain (Promusicae)	Gold	30,000^{‡}
United Kingdom (BPI)	2× Platinum	1,200,000^{‡}
United States (RIAA)	2× Platinum	2,000,000^{‡}
^{^} Shipments figures based on certification alone.^{‡} Sales+streaming figures based on certification alone.

== Release history ==
Release dates and formats for "Wherever You Will Go"
Region	Date	Format(s)	Label(s)	Ref.
United States	May 22, 2001	Mainstream rock; active rock; alternative radio	RCA	
United States	August 27, 2001	Hot adult contemporary radio	RCA	
United States	September 25, 2001	Contemporary hit radio	RCA	
Australia	March 11, 2002	CD	RCA; BMG	
New Zealand	March 18, 2002	CD	RCA; BMG	
Europe	June 17, 2002	CD	RCA; BMG	
United Kingdom	June 24, 2002	CD; cassette	RCA; BMG	

== Charlene Soraia version ==
"Wherever You Will Go"

Single by Charlene Soraia

from the album Moonchild and Love Is the Law
- Released: September 30, 2011
- Length: 3:17
- Label: Peacefrog
- Songwriters: Alex Band; Aaron Kamin
- Producer: Paul Stacey

Charlene Soraia singles chronology
"Wherever You Will Go" (2011)	"Bipolar" (2011)

The song was covered by English singer-songwriter Charlene Soraia for use in a Twinings advert in the United Kingdom. It was released in the UK as a digital download on September 30, 2011. On October 9, 2011, the song entered the UK Singles Chart at number 20 and peaked at number three two weeks later. It served as the lead single from Soraia's debut studio album, Moonchild (2011).

=== Music video ===
A music video for the song was uploaded to YouTube on October 3, 2011, at a total length of three minutes and thirty-eight seconds. The video shows Soraia in the studio performing the song.

=== Track listing ===
Digital download (released October 3, 2011)

1. "Wherever You Will Go" – 3:17
2. "Lightyears" – 3:03

=== Charts ===
==== Weekly charts ====
Weekly chart performance for "Wherever You Will Go"
Chart (2011–2014)	Peak position
France (SNEP)	127
Ireland (IRMA)	20
Scottish Singles Sales (Official Charts)	3
UK Singles (Official Charts)	3
UK Indie (Official Charts)	1
UK Streaming (OCC)	81

==== Year-end charts ====
Year-end chart performance for "Wherever You Will Go"
Chart (2011)	Position
UK Singles (OCC)	51
Chart (2012)	Position
UK Singles (OCC)	147

=== Certifications ===
Certifications for "Wherever You Will Go"
Region	Certification	Certified units/sales
United Kingdom (BPI)	Platinum	600,000^{‡}
^{‡} Sales+streaming figures based on certification alone.

=== Release history ===
Release dates and formats for "Wherever You Will Go"
Region	Date	Format(s)	Label(s)	Ref.
United Kingdom	September 30, 2011	Digital download	Peacefrog	

== In popular culture ==
The song was featured in the 2000 film Coyote Ugly in the scene where Violet first sees Kevin. The Calling performs the song live.

In 2001, the CBS network used the song and video to promote the debut of The Guardian.

The song was used in a commercial promoting the National Hockey League's 2001 Stanley Cup playoffs.

The song was featured in the 2003 British comedy-drama film Love Actually during a scene in which Colin (Kris Marshall) participates in an orgy with a group of Wisconsinite girls shortly after arriving in the United States.

The song plays during the final scenes of the series finale of Saving Grace.

The song plays in Smallville during the final scene of the episode "Metamorphosis" (Season 1 episode 2).

The song was parodied in Mad TV by several of the cast playing the Calling, Scott Stapp of Creed, Eddie Vedder of Pearl Jam, and Ray Charles, making fun of how all the singers' voices sound the same and they accuse each other of getting famous by imitating them.

This song is also featured in the popular South Korean drama I'm Sorry, I Love You, starring So Ji-sub and Im Soo-jung, and its soundtrack as well.

A cover of this song is also featured in the movie Unravel: A Swiss Side Love Story.

In JK Rowling's Cormoran Strike series, the song is used for Robin Ellacott's first dance with Matthew Cunliffe at their wedding in Lethal White. In the TV adaptation, the song is also played at their wedding reception.
