= Camino Palmero =

Studio album by the Calling
- Released: July 10, 2001
- Studio: Cherokee (Hollywood, California)
- Genre: Post-grunge
- Length: 46:06
- Label: RCA
- Producer: Marc Tanner

The Calling chronology
Camino Palmero (2001)	Two (2004)

Singles from Camino Palmero
- 1. "Wherever You Will Go" Released: May 22, 2001; 2. "Adrienne" Released: April 15, 2002; 3. "Could It Be Any Harder" Released: August 19, 2002

Camino Palmero is the debut studio album recorded by American rock band the Calling, released by RCA Records on July 10, 2001. It contains their hit single "Wherever You Will Go". The title of the album comes from a Los Angeles street where band members Alex Band and Aaron Kamin first met. The record has many grunge influences and guitar solos.

Lyrically, the album explores topics dealing with romantic love, relationships, heartache, and misplaced loyalty. The cover art of the album represents the platforms 5 and 6 of the Santa Maria Novella railway station in Florence, Italy.

Camino Palmero peaked at number 36 on Billboard 200 and was certified platinum by the Recording Industry Association of America (RIAA). The album was generally panned by music critics for its subject matter and unoriginality, but the arrangement and vocal performance of its lead singer were praised.

== Critical reception ==
Professional ratings
Review scores
Source	Rating
AllMusic	1.5/5 stars
Entertainment Weekly	C
Hot Press	(4/12)
Melodic	3.5/5 stars

Camino Palmero garnered mostly negative reviews from music critics. Johan Wippsson of Melodic saw potential in the band based on "Wherever You Will Go" and an amount of constant energy throughout the album despite generic lyrics about relationships, concluding with, "Except for that this is a very impressing debut from a group that have all the chances to be the next Lifehouse." Bob Waliszewski of Plugged In commended the album for delivering positive messages of forgiveness and self-realization but found it a little indulgent in its unsavoury delights, concluding that "Camino Palmero acknowledges God, celebrates lifelong love and speaks up for the destitute. But several cuts show bad form in their approach to women by modeling lust, bitterness and sexual immorality."

David Browne, writing for Entertainment Weekly, said that despite checking off all the requirements of arena rock he criticized Alex Band for writing songs that are self-indulgent in their tales of on-and-off again relationships, saying that "The Calling are so stiflingly earnest that their love song playing off the Who Wants to Be a Millionaire catchphrase – "Final Answer" – is dead serious." Hannah Hamilton of Hot Press panned the album for its overly simplistic musicianship and lyrics about unoriginal romances, calling it "a mild, meek, pathetic excuse for a record that goes nowhere, says nothing and charges you twenty euro for the pleasure. Guilty? Oh hell yes."

== Commercial performance ==
The album peaked at number 36 on the Billboard 200 and number 12 on the UK Albums Chart, while also reaching numbers 118 and 84 on their respective year-end charts. The album was also certified gold in Canada by November 2002, having sold over 50,000 units. Camino Palmero also did well on several international charts; it reached the top 10 in Austria, France, Germany, New Zealand, and Norway. In Brazil, it has been certified platinum by Associação Brasileira dos Produtores de Discos (ABPD).

"Could It Be Any Harder" peaked at number 35 on the US Billboard Adult Top 40 Tracks chart that September.

== Track listing ==
All tracks are written by Alex Band and Aaron Kamin, except "Stigmatized" which was co-written with Eric Bazilian.

No.	Title	Length
1.	"Unstoppable"	3:59
2.	"Nothing's Changed"	4:44
3.	"Wherever You Will Go"	3:28
4.	"Could It Be Any Harder"	4:41
5.	"Final Answer"	4:34
6.	"Adrienne"	4:30
7.	"We're Forgiven"	4:31
8.	"Things Don't Always Turn Out That Way"	4:11
9.	"Just That Good"	3:54
10.	"Thank You"	2:58
11.	"Stigmatized"	4:31
Total length:		46:06

Australian and UK bonus track
No.	Title	Length
12.	"Wherever You Will Go" (live)	3:18

Japan bonus track
No.	Title	Length
12.	"Lost"	3:49

iTunes bonus track
No.	Title	Length
12.	"For You"	3:41

Additional track
No.	Title	Length
12.	"When It All Falls Down"	3:36

== Personnel ==
Credits adapted from the Camino Palmero liner notes.

The Calling

- Alex Band – lead vocals
- Aaron Kamin – lead guitar, backing vocals
- Sean Woolstenhulme – rhythm guitar, backing vocals
- Billy Mohler – bass
- Nate Wood – drums, backing vocals

Additional musicians

- Ron Fair – synthesizer
- Bob Glaub – bass guitar
- Paul Mirkovich – keyboards
- Zac Rae – organ
- Satnam Ramgotra – percussion, tabla

Technical

- Ron Fair – executive producer
- Tiago Becker – assistant engineer
- Marc Greene – engineer
- Robert Hadley – mastering
- Frank Harkins – art direction, design
- Chris Lord – mixing
- Stephen Marcussen – mastering
- Doug Sax – mastering
- Matt Silva – mixing
- Marc Tanner – producer
- David Thoener – engineer, mixing

== Charts ==
=== Weekly charts ===
Weekly chart performance for Camino Palmero
Chart (2002)	Peak position
Australian Albums (ARIA)	23
Austrian Albums (Ö3 Austria)	9
Canadian Albums (Nielsen SoundScan)	35
Danish Albums (Hitlisten)	11
Dutch Albums (Album Top 100)	46
Europe (European Top 100 Albums)	19
French Albums (SNEP)	10
German Albums (Offizielle Top 100)	8
Irish Albums (IRMA)	21
Italian Albums (FIMI)	16
Italian Albums (Musica e Dischi)	27
New Zealand Albums (RMNZ)	9
Norwegian Albums (VG-lista)	10
Scottish Albums (Official Charts)	12
Swedish Albums (Sverigetopplistan)	11
Swiss Albums (Schweizer Hitparade)	26
UK Albums (Official Charts)	12
US Billboard 200	36

=== Year-end charts ===
Year-end chart performance for Camino Palmero
Chart (2002)	Position
Canadian Albums (Nielsen SoundScan)	198
Canadian Alternative Albums (Nielsen SoundScan)	65
Europe (European Top 100 Albums)	81
French Albums (SNEP)	120
German Albums (Offizielle Top 100)	91
Swiss Albums (Schweizer Hitparade)	97
UK Albums (OCC)	84
US Billboard 200	118

== Certifications ==
Certifications for Camino Palmero
Region	Certification	Certified units/sales
Brazil (Pro-Música Brasil)	Platinum	125,000^{*}
Canada (Music Canada)	Gold	50,000^{^}
New Zealand (RMNZ)	Gold	7,500^{‡}
United Kingdom (BPI)	Platinum	300,000^{*}
United States (RIAA)	Platinum	1,000,000^{‡}
^{*} Sales figures based on certification alone.^{^} Shipments figures based on certification alone.^{‡} Sales+streaming figures based on certification alone.
