= Alex Band =

American singer (born 1981)

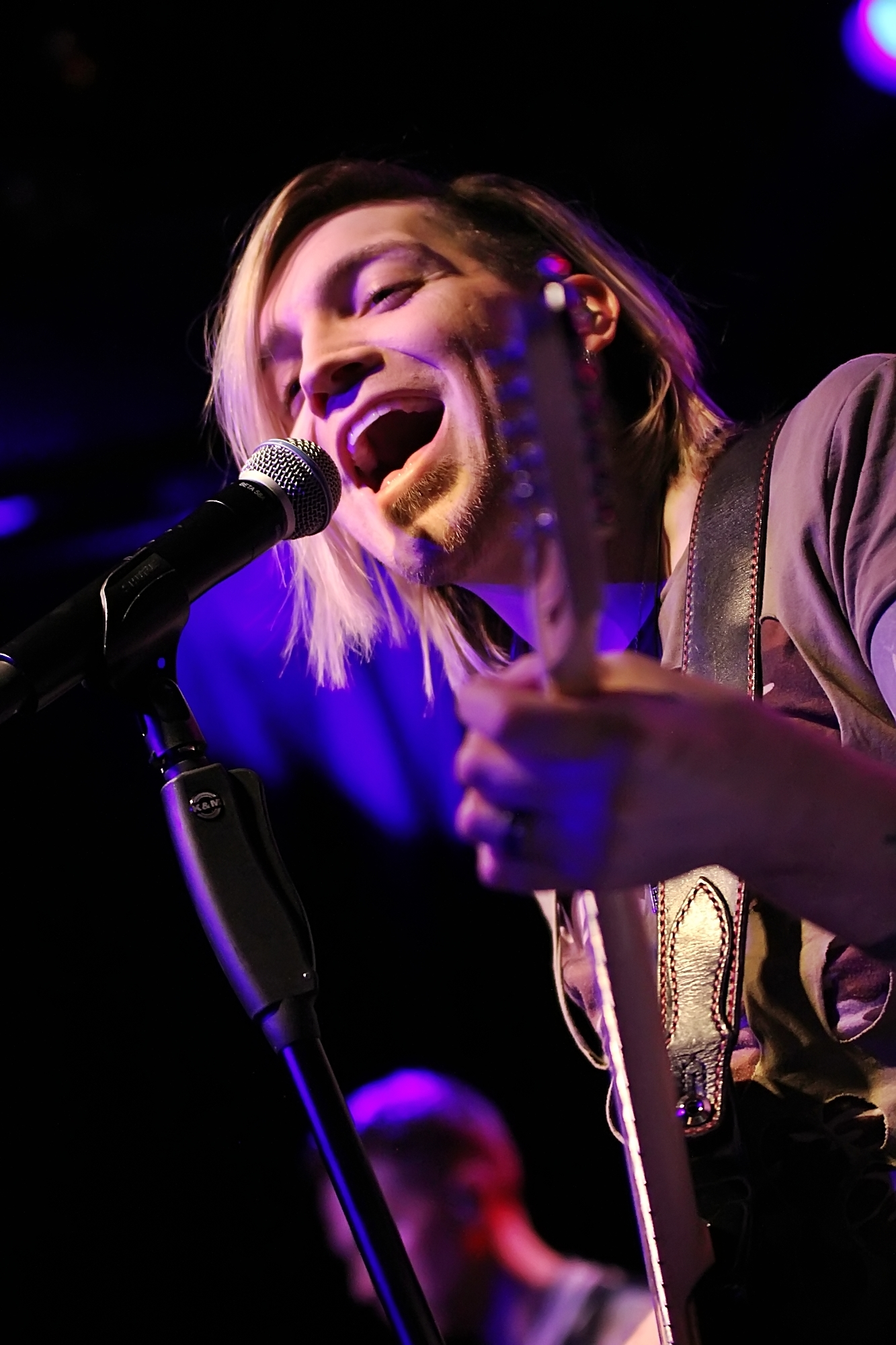
- Band performing in 2020
- Born: Alexander Max Band; June 8, 1981 (age 45); Los Angeles, California, U.S.
- Occupations: Singer; songwriter
- Years active: 1999–present
- Spouses: Jennifer Sky (m. 2004; div. 2009) Kristin Blanford (m. 2011; div. 2012) Shayna Weber (m. 2013)
- Children: 1
- Father: Charles Band
- Relatives: Richard Band (uncle); Albert Band (grandfather); Max Band (great-grandfather)
- Musical career
- Genres: Rock; alternative rock; post-grunge; pop rock
- Instruments: Vocals; guitar
- Labels: RCA; Geffen; AMB; EMI
- Member of: The Calling
- Website: alexbandmusic.com

Alexander Max Band (born June 8, 1981) is an American singer and songwriter. He is best known as the vocalist for the Los Angeles-based rock band the Calling. He performed their hit song "Wherever You Will Go," which topped the Adult Top 40 for 23 weeks, making it the second-longest-running number one single in the chart's history. Furthermore, it was later named the number one song of the 2000s decade on the Adult Pop Charts by Billboard.

Along with the band's lead guitarist and fellow songwriter Aaron Kamin, they achieved success with the release of their first two studio albums; Camino Palmero (2001), which sold over 5 million copies worldwide and was certified Gold by Recording Industry Association of America (RIAA), as well as their second album Two (2004), which sold over 1.5 million copies. The former spawned a successful follow-up single, "Adrienne" while the latter spawned the singles "Our Lives" and "Things Will Go My Way."

As a solo artist, Band is known for his guest performance on Santana's 2003 hit single "Why Don't You & I." In 2008, he formed his own record label AMB Records and released a five-song eponymous extended play (EP). Band later released his debut full-length album, We've All Been There, in June 2010 with "Tonight" as its lead single—which was used as the theme song for the 2010 World Cup. He released his second EP, After the Storm in 2012.

== Early life ==
Alex Band was born in Los Angeles, California, into an entertainment family. His mother is Meda Band (née Robertson), and his father, Charles Band, is a horror film director. His grandfather Albert Band was also another well-known director. Band's father is Jewish and his mother is Christian. Both his parents were raised in Italy and they owned a castle in Giove, Umbria. Band explores spiritual themes in several of his songs, though he claims to be of no particular faith himself. Of the song "Please", Band said;

"...I grew up with a Jewish father who didn't practice and a Christian mother whose only tie to Jesus was celebrating Christmas. Needless to say I had to find my own religion. And in this song I'm asking God what that should be...what should I believe? In a world so full of different religions and so many people fighting over whose belief is the correct one, it frustrates me to think that they all really boil down to the same thing."

At a young age, Band's parents divorced and his father remarried. He grew up with two of his half-brothers, Harlan and Zalman, and his sister, Taryn. In 2020, his younger half-brother Harlan died after battling with addiction for over a decade. After his parents' divorce, his mother moved to Germany where she remarried and still resides. Band was about 8 at the time. She had three sons after her move, who Band eventually met when he toured Germany. The single "Could It Be Any Harder" explains some of his feelings towards his mother's move.

Growing up, Band made small appearances in his father's films. He grew up on Camino Palmero street, which would later inspire his first album of the same name. He began playing guitar and songwriting at the age of 8. Musically, Band was influenced by Pearl Jam, Bon Jovi, Live, Train and U2. At the age of 14, he had a kokopelli tattooed on his wrist. This would later become a symbol for the Calling.

== The Calling ==
=== 1996–1999: Early formation ===
He soon formed his first band with friend and filmmaker, Jethro Rothe-Kushel, called "Maybe Solitude". Rothe-Kushel also directed his first music video for a song called "Dormant Prayer". After the band disbanded, Band met Aaron Kamin when Kamin was dating Band's sister. They both began writing songs and jamming as far back as 1996 and soon formed the band Generation Gap that consisted of him and Kamin, and a few much older musicians. At this stage, the band also had saxophonist, Benny Golbin, giving the songs a more jazzy sound reminiscent of Dave Matthews Band.

Eventually, Band and Kamin ditched the "Gap" lineup, and briefly switched their name to "Next Door", which itself was a nod to Ron Fair, a veteran music business executive and Band's neighbor.

Kamin and Band began focusing on songwriting more, and as Band's signature baritone voice began to mature, the duo began leaving demo tapes of new songs and ideas for Fair in his mailbox. They quickly found a similar sound amongst such ready-for-radio rock acts of the early 21st century as Matchbox Twenty, Third Eye Blind, Train, and Fastball.

By 1999, Fair was impressed enough by the demos to sign them to a record deal with RCA. They changed their name to the Calling, which reflected the band's renewed sense of purpose.

=== 1999–2005: Camino Palmero and Two ===
At the age of 17, Band signed with RCA Records with the band he had created with Kamin, now named the Calling. At this time, he dropped out of school, though he later received a diploma through home schooling. The Calling released their first single "Wherever You Will Go" to much acclaim. The song soon reached number 1 on the Billboard Hot AC charts for 23 weeks and peaked at number 5 on the Hot 100 charts as well as becoming an international hit. The band's first album, Camino Palmero, soon followed, peaking at number 36 on the Billboard Sales charts and eventually went Platinum. The band's next singles, "Adrienne" and "Could It Be Any Harder" soon followed, charting in the AC top 40.

However, by 2004, the second album, titled Two, failed to live up to expectations, charting at number 54 on Billboard Top 200. The album suffered from a lack of label support, though the singles fared slightly better. The first single, "Our Lives," was featured in the 2004 Olympics ceremony and charted at number 34 in the Billboard top 40. A final single, "Anything," performed decently with little promotion, charting at number 23 in the Adult Top 40.

After the lack of label support with Two, the band announced a hiatus. On June 4, 2005, they performed their last concert to date in Temecula, CA.

=== 2013–present: Reunion and upcoming album ===
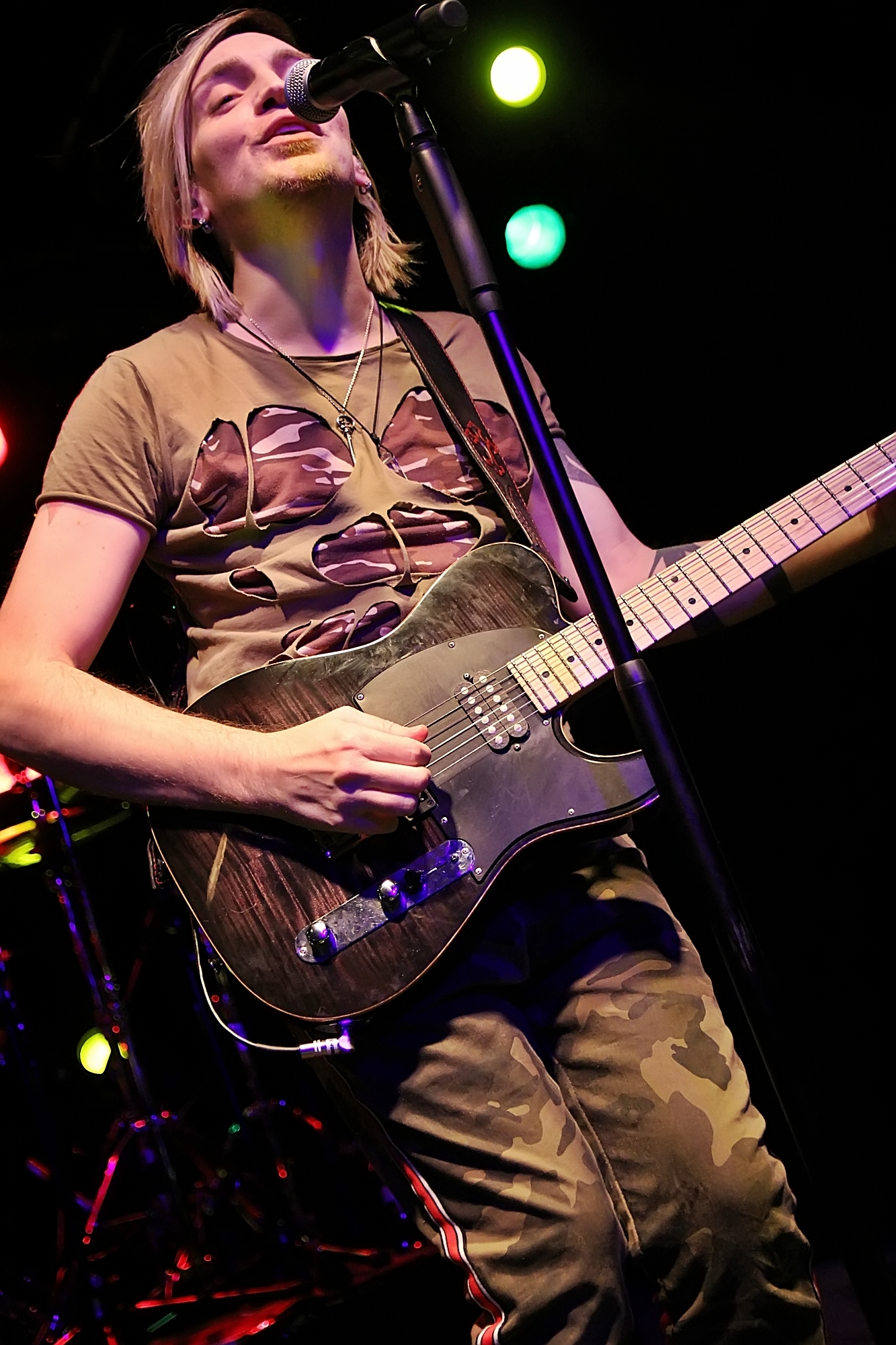
Band with The Calling in Nuremberg, Germany, 2020

On August 15, 2013, Alex Band reformed the Calling with new members. The group performed their comeback gig at Bally's Atlantic City on August 17. After only a few shows, the group broke up again.

In October 2016, the Calling reformed with a new lineup and performed in Manila, Philippines, the following month. The Australian company Unbreakable Touring announced that the band were to perform in cities that included Adelaide, Sydney, Brisbane, Melbourne, and Fremantle, along with the rock band Juke Kartel and newcomer Mike Waters, but this was later postponed due to visa issues. In July 2017, it was announced that the Calling would be joining Lifehouse as support acts for Live's Australian leg of their world reunion tour.

Band said in an interview with the Australian music website May the Rock Be with You in November 2017 that the Calling would be releasing new music soon.

In February 2020, in a YouTube video interview with Gareth Burrough of the Welsh podcast Steegcast, Band spoke of the future, including a plan to release new music as well as eventually releasing orchestral reworkings of some of the group's back catalogue.

The Calling released a brand new track, "Fallin' Apart", on August 7, 2023. The song was written and produced for a campaign in association with Singapore-based company Income Insurance and was made available on streaming platforms.

== Solo career ==
=== 2005–2008: Alex Band EP ===
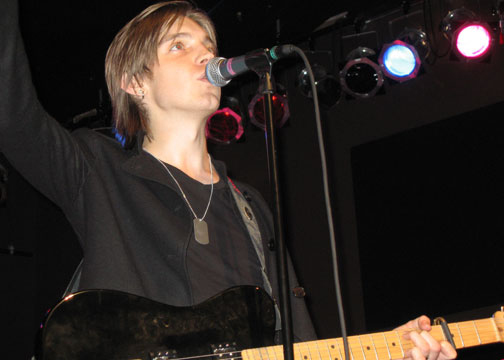
Band in 2007

In November 2005 it was announced Band had signed as a solo artist with Ron Fair as part of Geffen Records. A new album had been recorded and was said to be released in late 2007, but was delayed several times. Band left the Geffen label in 2008. Band also contributed the song "The Truth" to the soundtrack of the 2005 movie "Doll Graveyard" which was directed by his father.

During this time Band had a few releases. One of his songs titled, "It Doesn't Get Better Than This" for Bratz: The Movie soundtrack. Band performed and co-wrote the song, "Coming Home" which was featured in the film, The Final Season in late 2007.

In October 2007 Band performed at the first Alex Band's Donate Life Rocks charity concert for "Donate Life America" in Los Angeles, CA. The concert was taped and will air on DISH Network. Band also taped an appearance on The Real World: Hollywood which filmed at the concert. The second Alex Band Donate Life concert was held in Richmond, VA on August 21, 2008. The first music video in his solo career was again directed by lifelong friend and director / producer, Jethro Rothe-Kushel, for a song called "Only One". On April 25, 2008, Band released a 5-song EP titled, "Alex Band EP". The EP contained four new songs in addition to the song "Coming Home". The EP is sold via his official fan site. A new version of the EP was created for his tour in Brazil. On May 13 it was announced that the track, "Only One" would be the official single, for Brazil only, with both single and video available through Band's official fan site.

=== 2008–2011: We've All Been There ===
Band expressed displeasure with the continued delayed release of his debut album. On April 16, 2008, Band announced via his official fan site that he had left Geffen and created his own label called AMB Records under which the album in the US will be released, after buying back the rights to the master tapes after Geffen had gone through major restructuring. Band states:

I've been working on leaving my label for a while now, and moving to somewhere else to put this record out finally and give it the push it deserves... and I'm happy to announce that I will be putting the record out on my own! With help from good friends in the business and an amazing team, I'm putting together my own label. This gives me the freedom to make my own decisions, to invest in myself, and to do what I want, when I want. This is the way to go these days in the music business and I am so lucky to be able to do it. There are no firm details as to when exactly the record will be released, but I am doing everything in my power to make the process as speedy as possible. I will let you all know of course as soon as I find out more.

The first single "Tonight" was released on February 15, 2010, and entered the US Adult Pop charts at thirty one, also charting in countries including Austria, Germany, and Japan.

His debut solo album We've All Been There was released on June 29, 2010, in a distribution deal with EMI Records. The album entered the US Heatseekers charts at forty-two. The album achieved success in Germany, charting at number twelve.

Band released three more singles; "Without You", the second single from the album, was released digitally. The European exclusive third single "Only One" (a track originally released on his self titled EP) entered the German charts at sixty-six and was featured in American TV shows Melrose Place and The Vampire Diaries. The music video was directed by long time friend Jethro Rothe-Kushel. The fourth and final single "Euphoria" was released in Germany only. The music video featured home footage of Band and his former partner Kristin Blanford.

=== 2012: After the Storm ===
Band released his second EP titled After the Storm through the Killer Tracks label. The track "Shape of Your Heart" was featured in a Korean commercial for the Kia Sorento, and the track "Take Me Back" was featured in an episode of the Spanish Netflix show Cable Girls.

== Other projects ==
=== Songwriting ===
During and after his time in the Calling, Band and Kamin co-wrote all of the band's songs. They also wrote songs for several other artists as well as for several movie soundtracks, most of which Band would perform on. One of the first such tracks was the single, "For You" which appeared on the Daredevil soundtrack. The OST peaked at number 9 on the Billboard Top 200.

A cover of "Keep Your Hands to Yourself" was recorded for the movie Sweet Home Alabama. Band recorded a song "Take Hold of Me" for use in his wife's movie Fish Without a Bicycle in which he has a small part. He also Appeared on the Bratz: Motion Picture Soundtrack.

Band wrote the track "Always on My Mind" with American singer songwriter Jon McLaughlin for his second studio album OK Now, where Band also provided backing vocals.

=== Collaborations ===
He was personally chosen by Chad Kroeger to perform on the Carlos Santana single "Why Don't You & I" in 2003. Originally, Kroeger wrote and sang on "Why Don't You & I" for Santana's Shaman. However, when Arista Records decided to release the song as a single, Kroeger's record label refused permission, citing concerns that Kroeger appearing on a "high-profile single" that could conflict with his own newly released comeback album.

Band's version became extremely successful charting at number 3 on the Billboard Top 40, and number 8 on the Billboard Top 100. It was also recently named the number 5 song of the decade on the Adult Pop charts by Billboard. It reached number 1 on the AC charts and continues to be played on AC stations to this day. Band's version appears on Santana's special release album, Ceremony: remixes & rarities and Ultimate Santana.

In 2009, Band collaborated with Brazilian singer-songwriter Yasmin Lucas on the song "In Your Heart, I'm Home". The song entered the Brazilian charts at forty-seven and was featured on the Brazilian telenova Bela, a Feia, based on the American series Ugly Betty.

In 2010, the song "Cruel One" featured Canadian singer-songwriter Chantal Kreviazuk and American actress Emmy Rossum, which features as a bonus track to Band's solo album We've All Been There.

Band collaborated with Joanna Pacitti on the track "A Part of Me".

Band was featured on the season one finale of the reality TV series Flex & Shanice, where he collaborated with Shanice on a track. The episode, titled "It's My Party...", aired December 20, 2014. The track, however, has not been released.

In October 2016, Band was featured as a guest artist for the song "Donde Quiera Que Vayas Yo Iré" (a Spanish version to the hit song "Wherever You Will Go") by Venezuelan actress Gabriela Spanic. The song was released digitally on October 28, 2016.

=== Acting career ===
Band appeared in the 2000 movie Coyote Ugly as a musician on the stage of the club.

Band also appeared on the CSI: NY episode "Help", which aired January 14, 2009. Band played a drugged-out musician who is the suspect in a murder case. The songs he performed were his own (as did fellow guest star Bonnie McKee). He has said there will be more acting in the future.

=== Charity work ===
Band has worked with several charities. After an illness his ex-wife dealt with, Band became a supporter of organ donation, working closely with the charity Donate Life America. Annually, he performs at "Alex Band's Donate Life Rocks Concert" to raise money and awareness for the cause.

Each year Debbie Hagerman, who ran his official fan site, organized a birthday charity project in Band's name, asking that, in lieu of gifts, fans donate to a charity instead. In addition, a calendar was produced each year showcasing Band in concert. All proceeds went to the Alex Band Education Fund for Donate Life America. The projects have raised over $30,000 in honor of Band.

Band is also active in promoting awareness and involvement in The Michael J. Fox Foundation for Parkinson's Disease. He was diagnosed in 2012 with young onset Parkinson's disease, which he announced during a benefit show performed on Stageit from Ryan Cabrera's home on March 23, 2013.

== Personal life ==
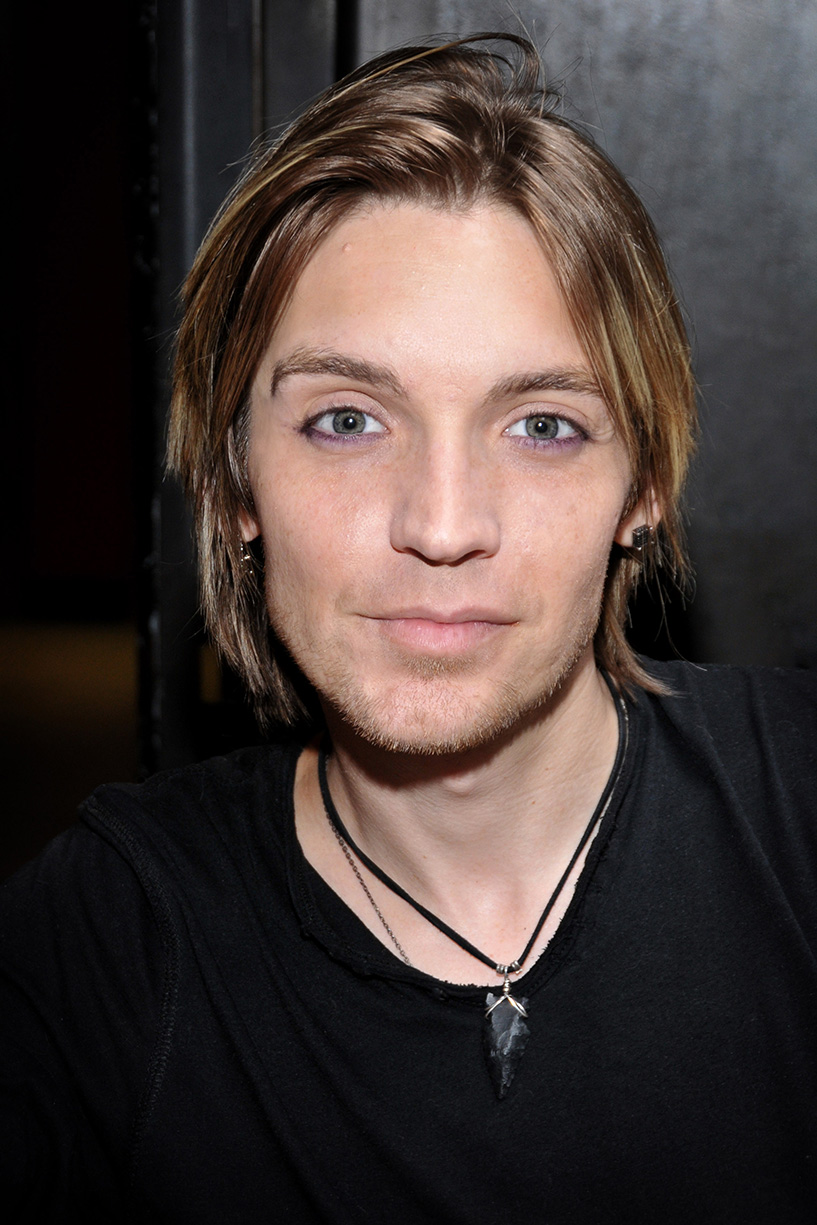
Band in 2015

Band currently resides in Los Angeles.

Band married actress Jennifer Sky, on July 25, 2004. The couple split in 2009. In February 2010, he became engaged to Kristin Blanford. She appeared in music videos for his songs "Tonight" and "Euphoria". They married on May 1, 2011, and divorced in April 2012.

Band married his girlfriend, Shayna Weber, in October 2013, which was confirmed on the Twitter account of each. Via Twitter, he confirmed in early 2016 that they were expecting their first child in the summer. Their son was born on September 3, 2016.

Band was abducted on August 18, 2013, by two men who robbed him, beat him severely and dumped him on the train tracks in Lapeer, Michigan. He was taken to an emergency room at a nearby hospital, where he was treated and released.

== Discography ==
=== Studio albums ===
Title	Album details	Peak chart positions				
Title	Album details	US	US Heat.	AUT	GER	SWI
We've All Been There	Released: June 29, 2010; Label: AMB/EMI	—	42	17	12	46
"—" denotes a release that did not chart.

=== EPs ===
Title	Album details
Alex Band EP	Released: May 2008 (US Edition), June 2008 (Brazil Edition)
After the Storm	Released: May 22, 2012; Label: Killer Tracks

=== Singles ===
Title	Year	Peak chart positions				Album
Title	Year	US Adult Pop	AUT	GER	JPN	Album
"Coming Home"	2007	—	—	—	—	Alex Band EP
"Only One"	2008	—	—	—	—	Alex Band EP
"Silent Night" (digital release)	2009	—	—	—	—	Non-album single
"Tonight"	2010	31	37	27	97	We've All Been There
"Without You"	2010	—	—	—	—	We've All Been There
"Only One" (European release)	2010	—	—	66	—	We've All Been There
"Euphoria" (German release)	2011	—	—	—	—	We've All Been There
"—" denotes a recording that did not chart or was not released in that territory.

==== As featured artist ====
Title	Year	Peak chart positions						Album
Title	Year	US	US Main	US AC	US Adult Pop	GER	NZ	Album
"Why Don't You & I" (Santana feat. Alex Band)	2003	8	3	16	1	76	21	Shaman
"In Your Heart, I'm Home" (Yasmin Lucas feat. Alex Band) (Note: Only released in Brazil)	2009	—	—	—	—	—	—	Bela, a Feia: Soundtrack
"Donde Quiera Que Vayas Yo Iré" (Gaby Spanic feat. Alex Band)	2016	—	—	—	—	—	—	Non-album single
"—" denotes a recording that did not chart or was not released in that territory.
