= The Calling (band) =

American rock band

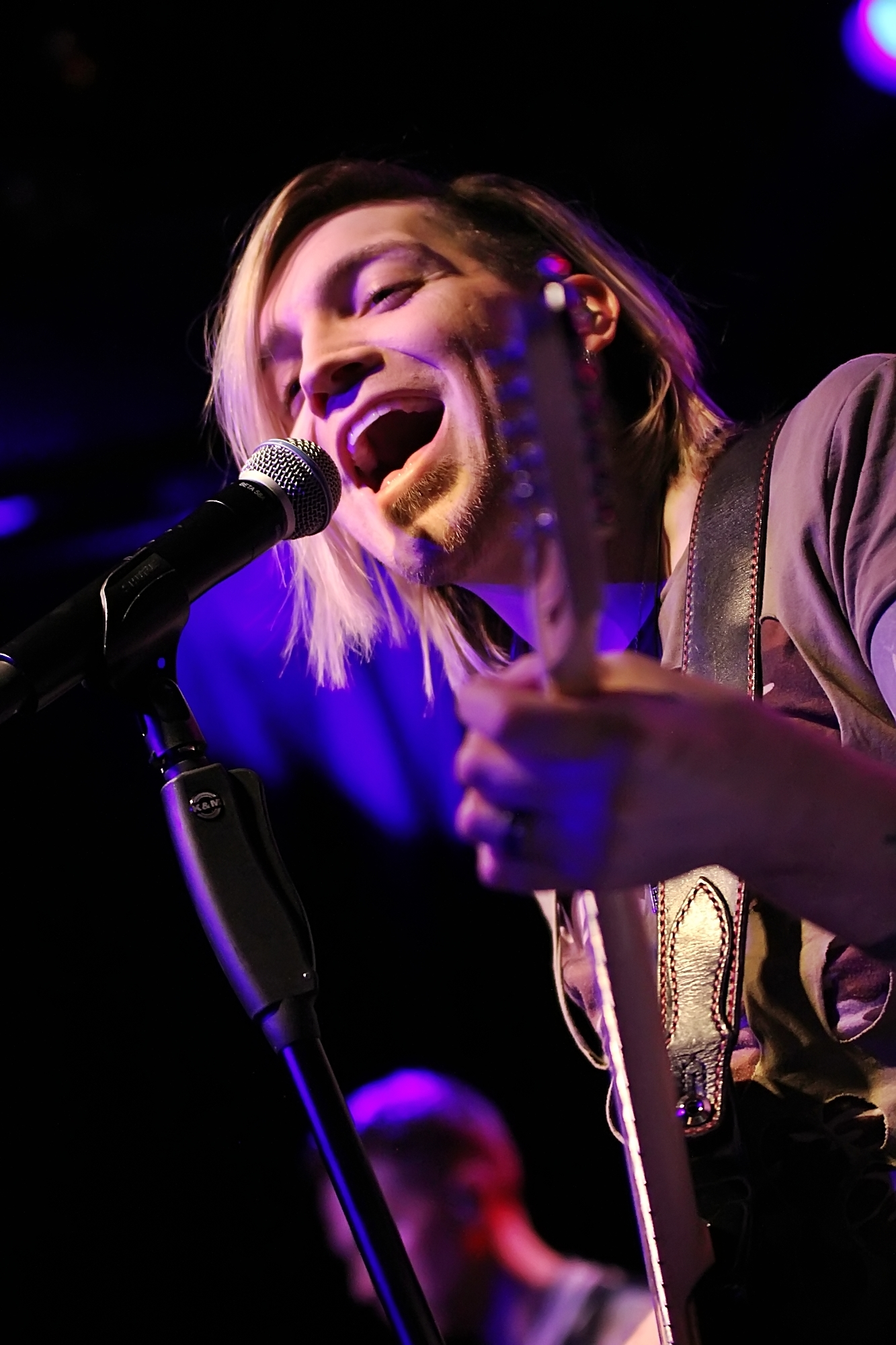
- Alex Band performing in 2020

Background information
- Also known as: Generation Gap (1996); Next Door (1996–1999)
- Origin: Los Angeles, California, U.S.
- Genres: Post-grunge; alternative rock; pop rock
- Years active: 1996–2005; 2013; 2016–present
- Labels: Sony BMG; RCA; TLG/Rock; Virgin
- Members: Alex Band; Daniel Damico; Dom Liberati
- Past members: Aaron Kamin; Sean Kipe; Jake Fehres; Art Pacheco; Nate Wood; Billy Mohler; Sean Woolstenhulme; Dino Meneghin; Daniel Thompson; Travis Loafman
- Website: www.thecallingmusic.com

The Calling is an American rock band from Los Angeles, California, formed in 1996 by lead singer and guitarist Alex Band and guitarist Aaron Kamin. They are best known for their 2001 single "Wherever You Will Go", which topped the US Billboard Adult Top 40 for 23 weeks—making it the second longest running number one in the chart's history—and was later named the number-one song of the 2000s on the chart, preceding the release of the band's debut studio album, Camino Palmero (2001). Though commercially successful, critical responses to both the song and album were generally negative.

Their second album, Two (2004), was supported by the lead single "Our Lives", which was featured in the closing ceremonies of the 2004 Summer Olympics as well as the opening song for the 78th Academy Awards. The band broke up in the year following its release, and reformed in 2016 following a failed attempt to do so in 2013. Since the formation of the band, there had been several lineup changes, with Band remaining its sole original member.

== History ==
=== Formation (1996–1999) ===
The band was formed by Alex Band and Aaron Kamin when Kamin was dating Band's sister. Kamin and Band initially began jamming and writing songs as far back as 1996, and began gigging under the band name "Generation Gap" with a drummer who was twice their age. At this stage, the band also included saxophonist Benny Golbin, giving the songs a more jazzy sound reminiscent of Dave Matthews Band. Eventually, Band and Kamin ditched the "Gap" lineup, and briefly switched their name to "Next Door", which itself was a nod to Ron Fair, a veteran music business executive and Band's neighbor.

They quickly found their own sound amongst radio rock acts of the early 21st century such as Matchbox Twenty, Third Eye Blind, Train, and Fastball. By 1999, Fair was impressed enough by the demos to sign them to a development deal with RCA. They changed their name to The Calling.

=== Wherever You Will Go, Camino Palmero and departures of Woolstenhulme, Mohler, and Wood (2000–2002) ===
While the RCA deal was a huge boost, it also created a new problem for Band and Kamin: they had no solid band and, thus, had hardly toured and built a fanbase. Band and Kamin also struggled to get the attention of label heads amid the pop explosion of the new millennium.

Once Coyote Ugly wanted it, the label was like, ‘Oh, this is a hit’. That was absolutely the catalyst — it woke up Ron Fair at RCA to go, ‘Okay, I guess this is good. Let’s make a record.’

— Alex Band on the beginning of recording their debut album

Kathy Nelson, then president of film music for The Walt Disney Motion Picture Group, heard the demo to their song "Wherever You Will Go" and decided to include it in the film Coyote Ugly, with the group also performing in the background as cameos. Because of this, Fair worked intensely with Band and Kamin on perfecting the debut album, which took over two years.

Five years after being signed to their record deal and nine months after the film's release, The Calling released their first single "Wherever You Will Go" on May 22, 2001. The song immediately brought them worldwide recognition, peaking at number five on the Billboard Hot 100 and topping the Adult Top 40 for 23 weeks, the second-longest-running number one in the chart's history, behind "Smooth" by Santana and Rob Thomas. The song was named the No. 1 Adult Pop song of the decade by Billboard magazine. The song was featured prominently in the television series Smallville's first-season episode "Metamorphosis". It was also featured in early trailers in 2001 for the Star Trek prequel series Enterprise. In an episode of the CBS television drama Cold Case, "Frank's Best", the song is played at the end of the episode.

Their debut album, Camino Palmero, was issued on July 10, 2001, and peaked at number 36 on Billboard 200 and was certified Gold by Recording Industry Association of America (RIAA), However, the album received generally negative reviews.

Approximately a year later, on April 15, 2002, The Calling released their second single, "Adrienne," which achieved moderate success.

Later, on August 19, 2002, The Calling released their third single, "Could It Be Any Harder", which achieved very little promotion, only charting at number 35 on the Adult Top 40 charts.

In June 2002, Woolstenhulme left The Calling. His replacement was Dino Meneghin. Mohler and Wood left in October 2002.

=== Two and first breakup (2003–2005) ===
In 2003, the Calling announced that they began work on their sophomore album, along with a new lineup. On February 10 the same year, the Calling recorded a track for the superhero movie Daredevil, titled "For You". It was released as the third single for the soundtrack album, while also appearing in the EP version. It was used as the closing credits to the film. The band performed the song live on The Tonight Show with Jay Leno in the February 13, 2003, episode. While the song failed to enter the US charts, it did fairly well in Italy, just past the Top 20 at number 19.

On March 29, 2004, they released their lead single "Our Lives" from their upcoming second album, which made its debut on hot adult contemporary radio the same day. It was featured in the 2004 Olympics ceremony, it was used as the opening song of the 78th annual Academy Awards and used as the theme song to the short lived series "Clubhouse" on CBS. The song was well received and charted at number 34 in the Billboard Top 40. It also reached the Top 20 in countries like Denmark and Italy.

In June 2004, the group returned with their sophomore album titled Two. However, Two had disappointing sales compared to their first album and failed to live up to expectations, charting at number 54 on Billboard Top 200.

A final single, "Anything," performed decently with little promotion, charting at number 23 in the Adult Top 40.

After a lengthy world tour in support of the album, despite the lack of support from the label, Kamin and Band decided to disband the Calling. They played a farewell show in Temecula, California on June 6, 2005. Alex then began pursuing a solo career and played occasional shows.

=== Temporary reunion and second breakup (2013) ===
On August 15, 2013, Alex Band reformed the Calling with new members; Sean Kipe on lead guitar, Jake Fehres on bass, and Art Pacheco on drums. The band performed their comeback gig at Bally's Atlantic City on August 17. Work on a new album began in early 2012 and took 10 months to complete, with a planned 2013 release through Universal.

The Calling performed at the Lapeer Days Festival in Lapeer, Michigan, where they performed their old hits, along with new music, including a song titled "Better", which was rumored to be their first single.

On August 18, Band was reportedly abducted by two men that robbed him, beat him severely, and dumped him on train tracks in Lapeer, Michigan. He was taken to an emergency room at a nearby hospital, where he was treated and released. Band reportedly lost a tooth, suffered a mild concussion and needed fifteen stitches to close a wound on his chin.

The abduction gained nationwide notoriety, while the locals at Lapeer were skeptical, as they believed that the abduction was a "hoax" and a "publicity stunt". Band denied all claims that the abduction was planned to promote The Calling's comeback.

After only a few shows, the group had drawn virtually no further publicity and later broke up again.

=== Third reunion, lineup changes, and touring (2016–2022) ===
In June 2016, Band created a Patreon page to share his work, including demos, unreleased music, covers, upcoming tracks, and behind the scenes footage. His first release from the page was an unmixed demo of a solo track titled "Place Inside of You", a track he performed on a livestream back in 2013.

In October 2016, The Calling reformed with a new lineup and performed in Manila, Philippines the following month. The Australian company "Unbreakable Touring" announced that the band were to perform in areas such as Adelaide, Sydney, Brisbane, Melbourne and Fremantle along with the rock band Juke Kartel and newcomer Mike Waters, but this was later postponed due to visa issues. In July 2017 it was announced that The Calling would be joining Lifehouse as support acts for Live's Australian leg of their world reunion tour.

Band said in an interview with Australian music website "may the rock be with you" in November 2017 that The Calling will be releasing new music soon.

The Calling began to tour around Europe in the beginning of 2020, with locations including the UK, Germany, Spain, Italy, and Austria. Whilst on tour in February, Band spoke in a video interview presentation with Welsh podcast SteegCast. In the video, Band speaks of his future music plans and talks of new material, including even at some point releasing orchestral workings of some of the Calling's best known songs.

The Calling announced their Latin America Tour on their social media to celebrate their 20th anniversary of their debut album, with dates starting in December 2022 in Brazil, Argentina, Costa Rica, and Mexico. Some of the dates were later pushed to May 2023.

=== New lineup, and Before the World Turns to Dust (2023–present) ===
In April 2023, The Calling announced a new lineup of the band once again; Band being the lead singer; Daniel Damico returning on lead guitar, and Dom Liberati on bass. The following month they teased production of new music, playing a snippet of a new track titled "Dust".

In July, 2023, The Calling announced that they will be playing an acoustic set for the Pop 2000 Tour in Palms Casino Resort, Las Vegas on August 19, 2023, along with Chris Kirkpatrick, Smash Mouth, O-Town and LFO.

On August 10, 2023, The Calling collaborated with Singaporean ad agency BBH Singapore to headline Income Insurance's new "Protection" campaign with their new song titled "Fallin' Apart", which was later released as a single; this marks The Calling's first official release of any new material since their last single "Anything" back in 2004. A music video was created and released on August 16, 2023.

The works of a third album began in September 2023. On December 11, 2023, The Calling posted teasers on their social media of the band working in Minneapolis, Minnesota with award-winning record producer John Fields (who had worked on Alex Band's solo album), further confirming that new music is being made, with an expected release date in 2024.

The Calling announced a 25-date Latin tour. Their first single from their upcoming third album, Stand Up Now, was released independently on May 3, 2024. During their tour, they teased another song, titled "Hold On Me", which is confirmed to be their next single.

In August 2024, during a livestream on Instagram, Band announced that The Calling have signed with UTA for management and with CTK Enterprises for representation, and had signed with an undisclosed record label. Band also confirmed that The Calling will release new music in the first quarter of 2025.

On May 19, 2026, The Calling celebrated the 25th anniversary of their debut single "Wherever You Will Go" through a live stream. During the stream, Band announced their official signing with the indie record label TLG|Rock, with distribution through Virgin Music Group. Band also announced the lead single "Dust" will be released on July 10. Their third album Before the World Turns to Dust will be released on September 25, 2026.

== Legal issues ==
=== Band structure and financial disputes ===
When the Calling was formed by the label, the executives pushed the image of a five-member rock band; however, lead members Band and Kamin have stated that the band have "always been a two-man group at its core since its foundation, with the other members hired as session and touring musicians."

In November 2003, Wood and Mohler, former members of the Calling, filed a lawsuit against Band, Kamin, and the group's management. They accused them of mismanagement, fraud, and demanded an audit of the funds used during their time in the band. Wood and Mohler alleged that they were promised a portion of the royalties and profits from touring and merchandise. Band and Kamin disputed their right to access any royalty records. Kamin called the suit “totally without merit” and says it was “settled very quickly” with him, Band and their managers. Band and Kamin claimed that the two were not entitled to any records of the royalties.

=== Trademark rights for the name and absence of Kamin ===
According to a report from The Hollywood Reporter, when the Calling was reformed in 2013, excluding Kamin, lead singer Alex Band filed a lawsuit against Kamin, claiming that he has “essentially disappeared from the public eye” and that any trademark rights over the band that Kamin held have "effectively been abandoned".

The complaint was that Kamin "simply refused to support the Calling on tour" when promoting Camino Palmero. The lawsuit also states that "Kamin prioritized his work on projects with other artists, refused to devote himself to writing and recording with the Calling, and fought Band’s decisions on every aspect of the album."

Kamin disputes the allegations, responding "I don’t know why I was supposed to give him the rights to something that was a representation of our collective talent. I’m sure I could find you proof of all the tours that I was out and about on."

The lawsuits between Band and Kamin have strained the relationship, but despite this, Kamin says he "couldn’t say no" to rejoining The Calling if asked.

== Band members ==
=== Current ===
- Alex Band – lead vocals (1996–2005, 2013, 2016–present), rhythm guitar (2016–present), bass (2016–2023)
- Daniel Damico – lead guitar, keyboards, backing vocals (2004–2005, 2016, 2023–present)
- Dom Liberati – bass (2023–present)

==== Current touring musicians ====
- Marc Slutsky – drums, percussion (2026–present)

=== Former ===
- Aaron Kamin – lead guitar, backing vocals (1996–2005), bass (2002–2005), rhythm guitar (2003–2005)
- Sean Woolstenhulme – rhythm guitar, backing vocals (1996–2002)
- Billy Mohler – bass (1996–2002)
- Nate Wood – drums, percussion, backing vocals (1996–2002)
- Dino Meneghin – rhythm guitar (2002–2003)
- Sean Kipe – lead guitar, rhythm guitar, backing vocals (2013)
- Jake Fehres – bass (2013)
- Art Pacheco – drums, percussion (2013)
- Daniel Thomson – drums, percussion, backing vocals (2016–2022)
- Travis Loafman – lead guitar, backing vocals (2016–2022)

==== Former touring musicians ====
- Kaveh Rastegar – bass (2004)
- Corey Britz – bass, keyboards, backing vocals (2004–2005)
- Justin Derrico – lead guitar (2004–2005)
- Justin Meyer – drums, percussion (2004–2005)
- Al Berry – bass (2016)
- Cubbie Fink – bass, backing vocals (2016–2020)
- Ryan Levant – keyboards, backing vocals (2016–2022)
- Joey Clement – bass guitar, backing vocals (2020–2022)

== Discography ==
Studio albums

- Camino Palmero (2001)
- Two (2004)
- Before the World Turns to Dust (2026)

== Awards ==
Year	Association	Work	Category	Result
2002	Smash Hits Poll Winners Party	Themselves	Best Rock Act	Won
2002	Smash Hits Poll Winners Party	Themselves	Best International Act	Nominated
2002	Smash Hits Poll Winners Party	Themselves	Best Newcomer on Planet Pop	Nominated
2002	MTV Europe Music Award	Themselves	Best New Act	Won
2002	NRJ Music Award	Themselves	International Duo/Group of the Year	Won
2002	Teen Choice Awards	Themselves	Choice Music: Breakout Artist	Nominated
2002	Teen Choice Awards	"Wherever You Will Go"	Choice Music: Love Song	Nominated
2002	Teen Choice Awards	"Adrienne"	Choice Music: Rock Track	Won
2002	Billboard Music Awards	Themselves	Hot 100 Singles Duo/Group of the Year	Nominated
2002	Billboard Music Awards	Themselves	New Pop Artist of the Year	Nominated
2002	Billboard Music Awards	Themselves	Top Hot Adult Top 40 Artist	Won
2002	Billboard Music Awards	"Wherever You Will Go"	Top Adult Top 40 Track	Won
2002	Billboard Music Awards	"Wherever You Will Go"	Top Hot 100 Song	Nominated
2002	Billboard Music Awards	"Wherever You Will Go"	Top Hot 100 Airplay Track	Nominated
2002	Billboard Music Awards	"Wherever You Will Go"	Top 40 Track of the Year	Nominated
2002	MTV Video Music Brazil	"Wherever You Will Go"	Best International Video	Nominated
2003	BDSCertified Spin Awards	"Wherever You Will Go"	500,000 Spins	Won
2003	BMI Pop Awards	"Wherever You Will Go"	Award-Winning Song	Won
2003	APRA Music Awards	"Wherever You Will Go"	Most Performed Foreign Work	Nominated
2004	MTV Video Music Brazil	"Our Lives"	Best International Video	Nominated
