= Moonchild =

Moonchild or Moon child may refer to:

== Literature ==
- Moonchild (novel), a 1917 novel by the British occultist Aleister Crowley
- Moon Child (manga), a 1989 manga series by Reiko Shimizu
- Another name for the Childlike Empress, a character in the 1979 children's book The Neverending Story

== Media ==
=== Film ===
- Moonchild (1974 film), an American horror film
- Moon Child (1989 film), a Spanish film
- Moon Child (2003 film), a Japanese film starring Gackt and Hyde

=== Television ===
- Child of the Moon, an episode of the American fantasy drama TV series Once Upon a Time

== Music ==
=== Artists ===
- MC the Max, also known as Moon Child, K-pop band
- Moonchild (American band), an alternative R&B band
- Moonchild Sanelly, South African electronic artist and pioneer of future ghetto punk
- Moonchild (Japanese group)

=== Albums ===
- A Moon Child in the Sky, a 2005 album by Tsukiko Amano
- Moonchild: Songs Without Words, by John Zorn
- Moon Child (Johnny Lytle album)
- Moon Child (Pharoah Sanders album)
- Moonchild (Celtus album) (1997)
- Moonchild (Charlene Soraia album)
- Moonchild (NIKI album) (2020)
- Moonchild Mixes (2022), album by Selena

=== Songs ===
- "Child of the Moon", the B-side of "Jumpin' Jack Flash" by the Rolling Stones
- "Moonchild", a song by Captain Beefheart and His Magic Band (1966)
- "Moonchild" (King Crimson song) (1969)
- "Moonchild", a song by blues songwriter Rory Gallagher from the album Calling Card (1976)
- "Moonchild", a song by Rick James from the album Glow (1985)
- "Moonchild", a song by Fields of the Nephilim from the album The Nephilim (1988)
- "Moonchild", a song by Iron Maiden from the album Seventh Son of a Seventh Son (1988)
- "Moonchild", a song by Shakespears Sister from the album Hormonally Yours (1992)
- "Moonchild", a song by Deborah Gibson from the album Deborah (1996)
- "Moonchild", a song by Chris Cornell from the album Euphoria Morning (1999)
- "Moonchild" (Cibo Matto song) (1999)
- "Moonchild", a song by M83 from the album Before the Dawn Heals Us (2005)
- "Moonchild", a song by rapper RM from the album Mono (2018)
- ”Moonchild”, a song by Neon Eyes (2020)
- "Moonchild Domain", a song by Dimmu Borgir from the album Godless Savage Garden (1998).
- "Moonchild", a song by Elysian (2020)

== Other uses ==
- Someone whose astrological sign is Cancer, since the sign is "ruled by the Moon"
- Moon Child (video game), a 1997 video game by Team Hoi

== See also ==
- Mooncalf
