= Battle of Ravenna (1512) =

1512 war of the League of Cambrai event

Coordinates: 44°25′N 12°12′E

- Part of the War of the League of Cambrai
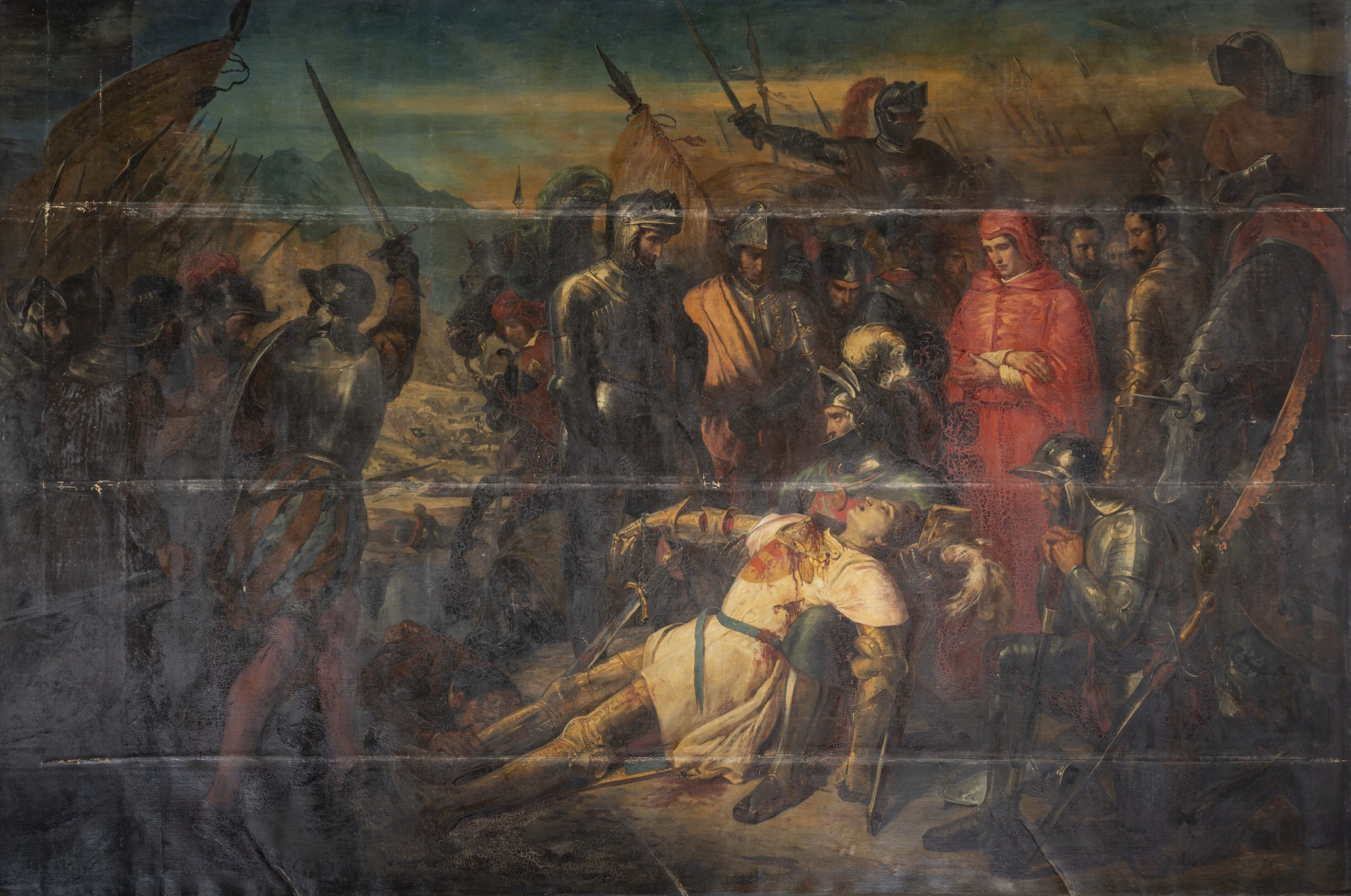
- Mort de Gaston de Foix à Ravenne, 11 avril 1512, oil on canvas by Ary Scheffer, 1824, Palace of Versailles
| Date | 11 April 1512 |
| Location | Near Ravenna, present-day Emilia-Romagna, Italy |
| Result | Franco-Ferrarese victory |

Belligerents
| Kingdom of France; Duchy of Ferrara | Spain; Papal States |

Commanders and leaders
| Gaston de Foix †; Jacques de La Palice; Alfonso I d'Este | Ramón de Cardona; Fabrizio Colonna (surrendered); Pedro Navarro (POW) |

Strength
| 2,000 men left to hold Ravenna; 21,000 men engaged against the relief army 54 artillery pieces | Garrison at Ravenna: 5,000 men Relief army: 16,000 men 30 artillery pieces 30 war wagons |

Casualties and losses
| 3,000–4,500 dead 4,500 wounded | 7,000 dead Unknown wounded 17,000 civilians killed |

The Battle of Ravenna, fought on 11 April 1512, was a major battle of the War of the League of Cambrai. It saw a Spanish-Papal army under Viceroy of Naples Ramón de Cardona (the Holy League) defeated by France and their Ferrarese allies under Gaston of Foix, who was killed during the battle.

The battle was exceptionally bloody and saw both sides making a previously unseen usage of artillery. The Spanish artillery inflicted massive casualties, after which Ferrarese general Alfonso d'Este responded with a decisive French flanking of the Holy League with their own guns, hitting the exposed enemy cavalry and making their line collapse. The Spanish infantry beat back the first French advances, but with their cavalry routed, the Holy League army was ultimately surrounded and defeated. Gaston of Foix then died in action when he attempted to rout the retreating Spanish with a cavalry charge.

The French and Ferrarese eliminated the main army of Naples as a serious threat, although their triumph was overshadowed by the loss of their young general. The victory therefore did not help them secure northern Italy, leading the French to withdraw entirely from Italy in the summer of 1512, as Swiss mercenaries hired by Pope Julius II and Imperial troops under Emperor Maximilian I arrived in Lombardy. The Sforza were restored to power in Milan.

== Background ==
=== Monster of Ravenna ===
A month before the battle, multiple sources reported a monstrous birth which became known as the Monster of Ravenna. This child's terrifying features included a horn on its forehead, wings, an eye on its knee, and a clawed foot, according to Florentine chronicler Luca Landucci. Its appearance was a cause for alarm, and news spread across Europe in the diaries of contemporary writers.

Most accounts, including that of Landucci's, associate the "monster's" appearance with the battle it preceded; its appearance was taken for a bad omen of future suffering, and the French medical professional Ambroise Paré opined that the creature's birth was a direct sign of God's wrath, brought to bear in the form of Louis XII's army. Regardless, the Monster of Ravenna acquired theological implications which evolved beyond the one battle and persisted well into the Protestant Reformation.

=== Prelude ===
Beginning in February 1512, the French forces in Italy, newly commanded by Gaston de Foix, Duc de Nemours, had been engaged in capturing cities in the Romagna and the Veneto, in an attempt to deny control of those regions to the forces of the Holy League. Although he had been successful in a number of sieges, Nemours was aware that the impending invasion of France by Henry VIII of England would cause much of his army to be withdrawn, and he was determined to force the main army of the Holy League into battle before that occurred. Thus, in late March, Nemours, together with an Italian contingent under Alfonso I d'Este, Duke of Ferrara, marched east from Bologna. The French army reached Ravenna on April 8 and started a bombardment of the city on the following day. A general assault was launched after a breach was made, but the attack was repulsed by Papal troops who defended the city. Over the next couple of days, the French forces attempted three "fruitless assaults".

Julius II, alarmed at the prospect of losing his last stronghold in the Romagna, demanded that an army be sent to relieve the city; Spanish viceroy Ramón de Cardona had to comply, and the Spanish army set out for Ravenna with a company of Papal troops in tow. By 9 April, they had passed Forlì and were advancing north along the Ronco River towards the city, and on the next day had reached Molinaccio, only a mile south of the French positions, but still separated from them by the Ronco. Marcantonio I Colonna, at the time in Spanish service, forced his way into the city with 600 men and brought the news. Gaston of Foix, short on supplies and increasingly anxious to give battle before he was forced to withdraw from Italy, ordered that a general attack be launched. On the morning of Easter day, April 11, the French army left camp, crossed the Ronco, and approached the Spanish–Papal position. Foix issued an embassy and challenged Cardona to decide the battle through a duel, but it was rejected.

== Battle ==
=== Dispositions ===
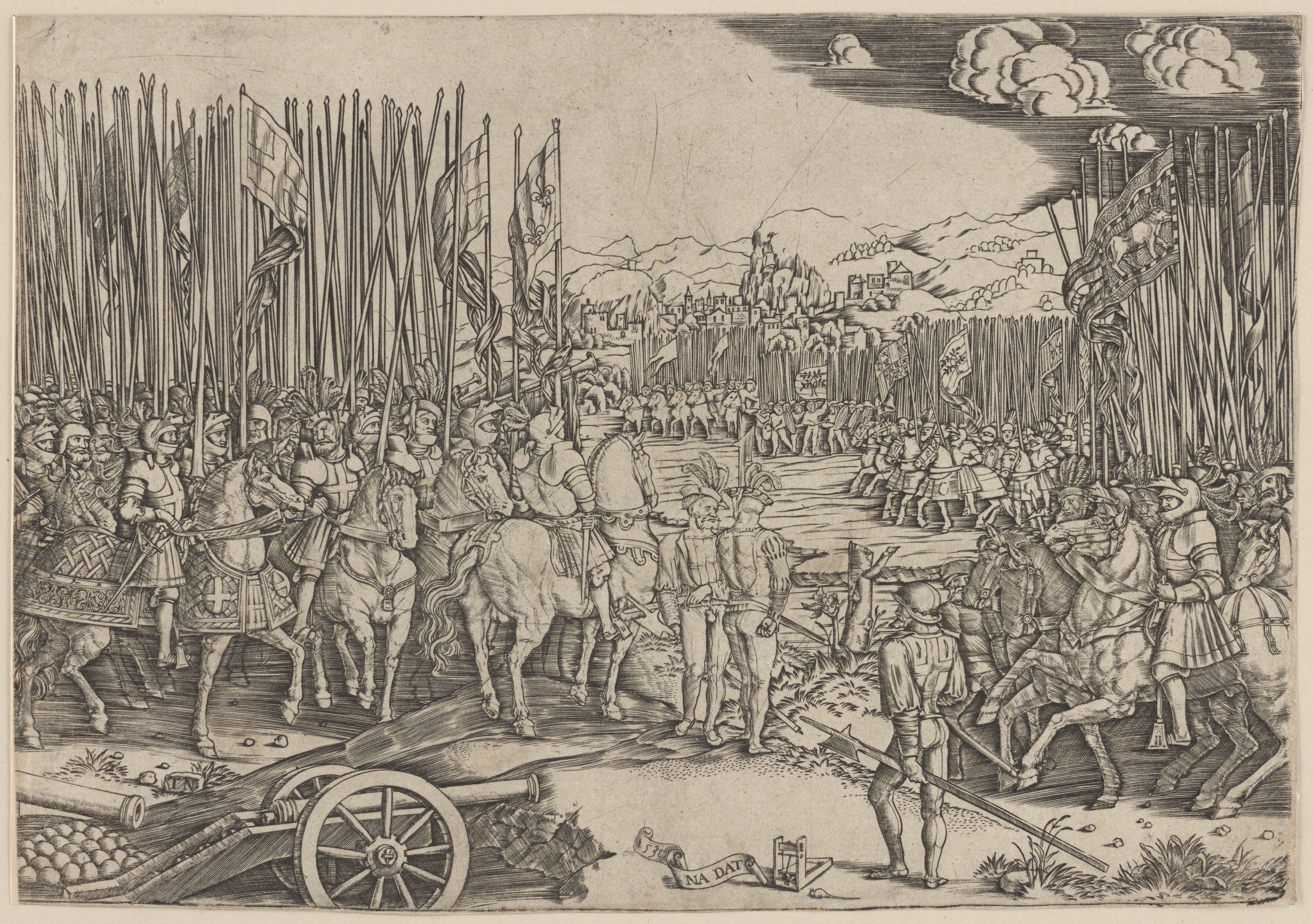
The Two Armies at the Battle of Ravenna (1530 woodcut)

The strengths, relative positions, and commanders of the component elements of both armies are unclear, and different arrangements are given by historians. The French army formed up in an arc to the east of Cardona's fortified camp; closest to the river were about 900 men-at-arms of the "vaward", under Jacques de La Palice and Alfonso d'Este. Next to this cavalry was the bulk of the infantry. According to Charles Oman, it consisted of three separate units: 3,500 Gascon crossbowmen, 5,000 landsknechts under Jacob Empser, and 3,000 Picards and Gascons under Thomas Bohier, the Seneschal of Normandy. Frederick Taylor groups the infantry into only two units: 9,500 landsknechts under Empser and 8,000 "Gascon archers and Picard pikemen" under the Seigneur de Molart. The men-at-arms of the "main-battle", consisting of 780 men, was commanded by either Bohier alone, or by Bohier together with the Vicomte de Lautrec, Louis d'Ars, and the Chevalier de Bayard.

The cavalry occupied one of two positions: according to Oman and Thomas Arnold, it was placed in the arc to the left of the French infantry, while Taylor has it behind the cavalry of the "vaward", next to the river. Farther to the left of the French line—beyond the cavalry of the "main-battle", according to Arnold and Oman, or directly flanking the infantry, according to Taylor—was the "rearward" corps of the army, commanded by Yves d'Alégre. It consisted of about 4,000 mostly Italian infantry under Frederigo de Bozzolo, flanked, on the extreme left, by about 2,000 light cavalry under Gian Bernardo Caracciolo. The French force also included 50 "modern cannons," built and brought by Alfonso I d'Este, Duke of Ferrara and considered the best in Europe at the time. These cannons fired all-metal cannonballs and had a faster rate of fire compared to older guns

Meanwhile Cardona entrenched the Holy League army in a semi-circular fortification following Navarro's advice, most likely based on his experience on Cerignola. However, the resultant fortified camp was cramped and did not adequately provide protection against artillery. The arrangement of their army is similarly a matter of dispute; Oman comments that "the array of Cardona's army, though elaborately described by more than one narrator, is not very easy to make out." At the north end of the camp, near the river, was the cavalry of the "vaward", consisting of about 670 Papal men-at-arms under Fabrizio Colonna. Farther along the river were two more bodies of men-at-arms: the "main-battle", consisting of 565 men under the Marquis of La Palude, and the rearguard, consisting of 490 men under Alfonso Carvajal.

Taylor divides the Holy League infantry into four blocks: three divisions of Spanish infantry, each consisting of four colunellas of 500–600 men each, and one formation of Papal infantry, numbering about 2,000, all under the general command of Pedro Navarro; Taylor places the formations of infantry in a deep column parallel to the river, on the far side of the cavalry, and perpendicular to the entrenchments. Oman and Arnold place the infantry in three lines running along the length of the entrenchments; no number is given for the first of these, but the second is given as consisting of 4,000 men, and the third, placed as a reserve, as including "three Spanish foot regiments" as well as the 2,000 Papal infantry. Beyond the infantry—to the far side of it from the river, according to Taylor, or at the end of its line, according to Oman and Arnold—was the light cavalry, consisting of 1,500–1,700 Spanish jinetes and Italian mounted arquebusiers under the command of Fernando d'Avalos, Marquis of Pescara. The Spanish also had at least thirty war wagons armed with scythe blades, forward-projecting spears and organ guns, a contraption used in Spain since the 15th century.

=== Artillery exchange ===
The advancing French troops halted about two hundred paces from the enemy lines. The sporadic exchange of artillery fire that had been taking place since the French had begun to cross the Ronco now developed into a full-scale artillery duel between the two armies that lasted more than two hours. A new tactic, the open-field exchange of artillery fire was "the most violent cannonade between armies in the field that the world had yet seen", according to Taylor, and "the first of its kind in the historical record", according to Bert Hall.

De Foix placed the bulk of his artillery in front of the French right wing, directing its fire into the Holy League's camp. Navarro ordered his infantry to take cover—the troops hid in the trenches, or lay prone on the slopes of the river embankments—but Colonna's men-at-arms had no shelter available, and began to take heavy casualties from the cannon fire. The Spanish artillery, meanwhile, ignored the French cavalry and concentrated its fire on the massed Gascons and landsknechts in the French center. The Spanish fire was, according to Oman, "excessively murderous", and casualties among the French infantry were substantial; as many as 2,000 men were killed, and the Gascons were so shaken by the fire that the landsknechts were forced to push them back with pikes in order to keep them in line.

The Duke of Ferrara, who had apparently been acting independently of the main army since the crossing of the Ronco, noticed that they were achieving little effect by bombarding the camp from one side. He also observed the Spanish war chariots were acting as an improvised barrier against his cannonballs. Determining to enfilade the camp from the flanks, he moved twenty-four of his cannon around the rear of the French position, bringing them up on the left flank against Pescara's light cavalry. From this position, d'Este's guns inflicted heavy casualties on Pescara and Carvajal's cavalry; so intense was the fire that some of it overshot the camp, inflicting casualties on the French troops on the other side. When his artillerymen warned him they were hitting their own allies, d'Este reportedly ordered them to keep firing, stating the French were his enemies too. Yves d'Alègre, meanwhile, followed a similar plan on the other flank; re-crossing the Ronco with two heavy guns, he positioned them across the river from the Spanish camp—directly to the rear of Colonna's position.

The fire of these two guns inflicted massive casualties on Colonna's closely packed cavalry. Not being experienced in the usage of land artillery, Cardona offered no answer to the French repositioning, even when he could have attempted to mirror the movement and reorient his own artillery to the flanks. Colonna meanwhile clashed with Navarro, noting that their cavalry was taking losses defenselessly without making a move, but Navarro ordered him to remain in his post. A verbal fight broke among them, with Colonna chastising him and asking, "Is the honor of Italy and Spain lost because of a Navarre?"

=== Cavalry fight ===
Pressed from both sides by the fire of the French and Ferrarese artillery, the Holy League's cavalry could not hold their positions indefinitely. The first to move were the heavy cavalry of the rearguard under Carvajal, riding out from the entrenchments towards the Ferrarese guns on the French left; according to Taylor, Carvajal's advance was disorderly and possibly spontaneous. Carvajal was quickly joined by Pescara's light cavalry and by the Marquis of La Palude, both having been sent forward by Cardona; together, these bodies of cavalry advanced on the French line, Palude moving directly forwards while Pescara attempted a flanking movement. The target of the cavalry attack is inconsistently named among contemporary sources; both Oman and Taylor agree that it must have been the heavy cavalry of the French "main-battle", commanded by Foix, Lautrec, and the Seneschal of Normandy, which had apparently moved towards the French left.

Carvajal, Pescara, and Palude converged on the French cavalry, which split into two bodies and met both Spanish attacks head-on. The initial Spanish charges were unsuccessful in breaking the French line; Taylor attributes their failure to the depleted morale of the Spanish cavalry after the artillery bombardment, the effect of "ditches and vegetation" on the Spanish formations, the better tactics of the French, and the arrival of reinforcements sent by La Palice from the French vanguard. The bodies of French and Spanish cavalry then engaged in a lengthy fight along the left of the French positions.

Meanwhile, Fabrizio Colonna, having seen the other Spanish cavalry engaged, rode out between the Ronco and the Spanish trenches and charged the French line; his target is similarly the subject of disagreement among contemporary sources, but Oman and Taylor agree that he must have attacked the portion of the French vanguard under La Palice which the latter had not sent to assist Foix in the center. As Colonna and La Palice fought along the French right, d'Alègre, who had earlier been summoned by La Palice, arrived with 400 fresh heavy cavalry, as well as the infantry of the French reserve. Colonna's formation, pressed from multiple directions, began to disintegrate, with some of his men-at-arms fleeing the field and others retreating south to where the other Spanish cavalry was engaged.

D'Alègre followed the retreating Spanish troops to the center, where the remnants of the Spanish cavalry were engaged in a desperate melee against the French. Finally, when a part of the French vanguard joined the fight as well, the Spanish cavalry broke; Pescara and La Palude were taken prisoner, Colonna retreated back into the Spanish entrenchments, and Carvajal and Cardona fled south-west towards Cesena. A large part of the French cavalry pursued the retreating Spanish, while the others turned to take part in the infantry fight which had unfolded in the meantime.

=== Infantry fight ===
As the Spanish cavalry was making its initial attack, Foix had sent orders for the French infantry to advance on the Holy League's camp. A mixed group of 2,000 Gascon crossbowmen and 1,000 Picard pikemen, gathered from Molart's and Bozollo's troops, advanced towards the camp; according to Taylor, they moved along a path between the embankment and the river, and were shielded from view by the former. The Gascons advanced to the edge of the Spanish entrenchments and began to fire onto the Spanish infantry; according to Oman, they were immediately driven back by "a blistering fire of arquebuses and swivel guns", while Taylor writes that Navarro moved the Papal infantry forward to engage them.

The main column of landsknechts had meanwhile made its way to the edge of the Spanish entrenchments, and begun to force its way into the fortified camp. Jacob Empser and his lieutenant Fabian von Schlabendorf were both killed in the initial push, but parts of the German column finally crossed the ditch and engaged the waiting Spanish infantry hand-to-hand. The Spanish rodeleros inflicted massive casualties among the landsknechts—who were unable to defend themselves with long pikes at such close quarters—and the German column recoiled back across the trenches, having suffered more than a thousand casualties.

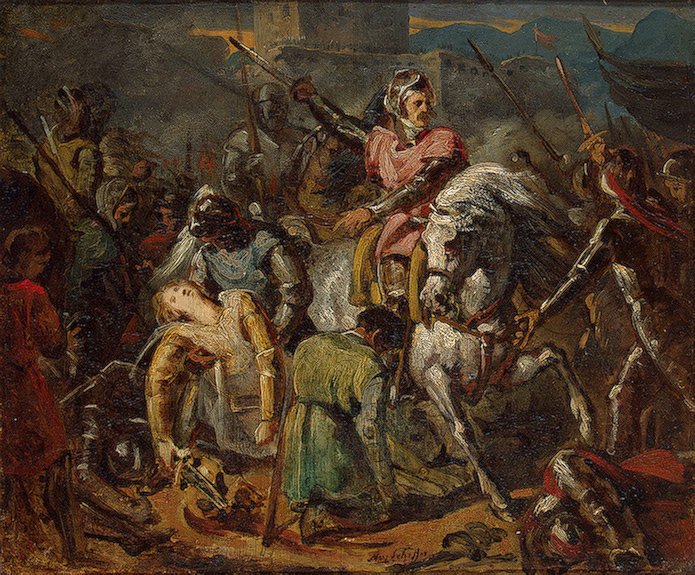
The Death of Gaston de Foix in the Battle of Ravenna on 11 April 1512 (oil on canvas by Ary Scheffer, c. 1824)

The landsknechts and the Gascons proceeded to attack once more, with even greater casualties. Fabrizio Colonna, who had by this time returned to the camp with the remnants of his cavalry, charged into the flank of the attacking infantry; he would write that "with 200 lances he could have retrieved the fortune of the day". Two companies of Spanish infantry attacked the Gascons engaged on the riverbank, breaking their formation, killing Molart, and pursuing them back towards the French artillery positions. The remaining infantry on both sides continued meanwhile to struggle across the entrenchments.

=== Endgame ===
At this juncture, the French cavalry—both those that had returned from the pursuit of Cardona and those that had remained on the field—descended on the Spanish infantry from all sides. Part of the attack was led by d'Alègre, set on a frenzy when his son Viverois was killed in front of him, although he was killed too in the resultant melee. Together with the German and Gascon infantry, which had reformed and now renewed its attacks, the French cavalry overwhelmed the Spanish formations, inflicting terrible casualties; Colonna and Navarro were both wounded as they tried to rally the defenders, with Navarro being captured and Colonna surrendering to d'Este on the condition he would not be handed to the French. A few thousand of the Spanish infantry managed to escape, fleeing towards Cesena and Forlì; the others were "ridden over and trampled down", according to Oman.

The two Spanish companies which had earlier routed the Gascons, having found their path north barred by the French rearguard under the Bastard du Fay, had meanwhile retraced their path along the river back towards the camp. Marching south along the embankment, they remained orderly and compact, covering their retreat by a sleeve of arquebusiers who inflicted losses on their pursuers. Attempting to break them, Gaston de Foix and his personal staff, numbering about fifteen, attacked them. In the ensuing melee, the French knights were scattered and Foix was surrounded, being killed by the Spanish infants, after which the latter proceeded to withdraw from the field. His cousin Odet de Foix was also gravely wounded but survived. A few miles from the battlefield, the Spanish infantry encountered Bayard, returning from his pursuit of Cardona; lacking the numbers to break them, Bayard let them pass, unaware that they had just killed his commander.

== Aftermath ==
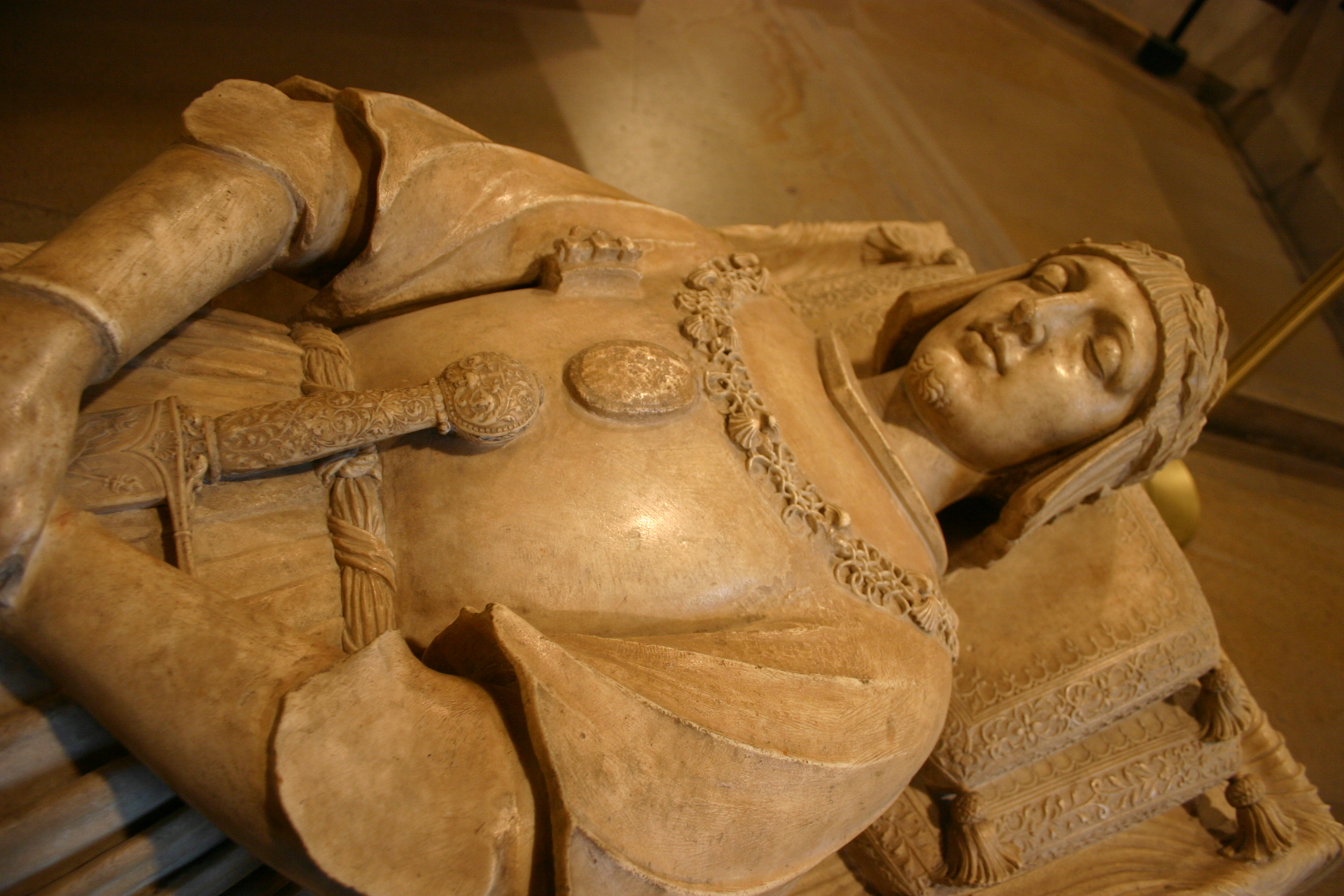
Funerary monument to Gaston de Foix, commander of the French army, killed at Ravenna

The battle went on for eight hours and left, by contemporary accounts, more than 10,000 dead between both sides. The death of Gaston de Foix was a huge blow to the French, and his men were very sad to hear of his death. The young, talented general had a very high command level and had masterminded a remarkable string of victories in Italy, and was inspiring and faithful to his men. The Italian Wars might have taken a very different course had he survived the battle. According to Guicciardini, without him, "the valor and ferocity of his army were completely lost", with Bayard similarly writing to his uncle the Archbiship of Grenoble, "now it would seem we were the ones who lost the battle."

Following the death of Gaston de Foix, command of the French army fell to La Palice, who had little interest in pursuing the retreating Spanish forces, preferring instead to return to the siege of Ravenna. Intimidated by the loss, the authorities of the city decided to surrender against the advice of Marcantonio Colonna, who feared the French would retaliate for their losses in the battle. As he had warned, the French proceeded to thoroughly sack it for three days, worsened by the fact that most of their captains had been killed or wounded in the battle and therefore could not restrain their men. 17,000 civilians were massacred, more than the casualties on both sides of the battle itself. According to Italian sources, the French did "much worse than Turks", killing the men and taking the women as slaves even whenever their ransoms were paid.

Much of the French army was withdrawn to France following the battle, and La Palice, unable to march towards Rome due to his losses, was forced to extricate himself from Italy in August by renewed efforts on the part of the Holy League. The Spanish forces in Italy were almost entirely destroyed at Ravenna, but Cardona would raise another army and appear in Lombardy, reconquering it with the help of the Papal troops in 1513. In the meantime, both Navarro and Colonna would see combat, Colonna in command of an Italian army and Navarro in the service of Francis I of France.

== Bibliography ==
- Arántegui Sanz, José, Apuntes históricos sobre la artillería española en la primera mitad del siglo XVI: segunda parte de la obra de igual titulo referente á los siglos XIV y XV, Imprenta del Cuerpo de artillería, 1891
- Arnold, Thomas F. The Renaissance at War. Smithsonian History of Warfare, edited by John Keegan. New York: Smithsonian Books / Collins, 2006. ISBN 0-06-089195-5.
- Baumgartner, Frederic J. Louis XII. New York: St. Martin's Press, 1994. ISBN 0-312-12072-9.
- Black, Jeremy. "Dynasty Forged by Fire." MHQ: The Quarterly Journal of Military History 18, no. 3 (Spring 2006): 34–43. ISSN 1040-5992.
- ———. European Warfare, 1494–1660. Warfare and History, edited by Jeremy Black. London: Routledge, 2002. ISBN 0-415-27532-6.
- Bowd, Stephen D. (2018). Renaissance Mass Murder: Civilians and Soldiers during the Italian Wars. Oxford University Press.
- Daston, Lorraine; Park, Katharine (1998). Wonders and the Order of Nature, 1150–1750. New York: Zone Books, distributed by MIT Press. ISBN 0-942299-90-6.
- de Cadenas y Vicent, Vicente (1978). La herencia imperial de Carlos V en Italia: El milanesado (España en Italia). Instituto Salazar y Castro (C.S.I.C.). ISBN 978-8400037284.
- Guicciardini, Francesco. The History of Italy. Translated by Sydney Alexander. Princeton: Princeton University Press, 1984. ISBN 0-691-00800-0.
- Hall, Bert S. Weapons and Warfare in Renaissance Europe: Gunpowder, Technology, and Tactics. Baltimore: Johns Hopkins University Press, 1997. ISBN 0-8018-5531-4.
- Mallett, M. E. and J. R. Hale. The Military Organization of a Renaissance State: Venice c. 1400 to 1617. Cambridge: Cambridge University Press, 2006. ISBN 0-521-03247-4.
- Muñoz Lorente, Carlos V a la conquista de Europa, Ediciones Nowtilus, 2015. ISBN 9788499675893
- Najemy, John M. A History of Florence: 1200–1575. Malden, Mass.: Blackwell Publishing, 2006. ISBN 1-4051-1954-3.
- Niccoli, Ottavia (1990). Prophecy and People in Renaissance Italy. Translated by Cochrane, Lydia G. Princeton University Press. ISBN 0-691-05568-8.
- Norwich, John Julius. A History of Venice. New York: Vintage Books, 1989. ISBN 0-679-72197-5.
- Oman, Charles. A History of the Art of War in the Sixteenth Century. London: Methuen & Co., 1937.
- Paré, Ambroise (1982). On Monsters and Marvels. Translated by Pallister, Janis L. University of Chicago Press. ISBN 0-226-64563-0. Based on the Malgaigne edition of 1840.
- Phillips, Charles and Alan Axelrod. Encyclopedia of Wars. Volume 2. New York: Facts on File, 2005. ISBN 0-8160-2851-6.
- Spada, Sergio. La battaglia di Ravenna. Il gran fatto d'arme del 1512, Ponte Vecchio, 2011. ISBN 978-8865411766
- Taylor, Frederick Lewis. The Art of War in Italy, 1494–1529. Westport, Conn.: Greenwood Press, 1973. First published 1921 by Cambridge University Press. ISBN 0-8371-5025-6.
