= Celtus (disambiguation) =

Celtus may refer to various Greek mythology figures. Celtus may also refer to:

- Celtus Dossou Yovo (born 1986), Beninese judoka
- Celtus (band), band

== See also ==
- Celtuce
