= Lectionary 278 =

Lectionary ℓ 278
- New Testament manuscript
- Text: Evangelistarium
- Date: 11th century
- Script: Greek
- Now at: Venice
- Size: 29.5 cm by 21.7 cm
- Type: Byzantine text-type
- Note: illuminated

Lectionary 278, designated by siglum ℓ 278 (in the Gregory-Aland numbering) is a Greek manuscript of the New Testament, on parchment. Palaeographically it has been assigned to the 11th century. Frederick Henry Ambrose Scrivener labelled it as 186^{e},

The manuscript has complex contents.

== Description ==
The codex contains lessons from the Gospel of John, Matthew, and Luke (Evangelistarium).

The text is written in Greek minuscule letters, on 221 parchment leaves (29.5 cm by 21.7 cm), in two columns per page, 19 lines per page. The manuscript contains weekday Gospel lessons from Easter to Pentecost and Saturday/Sunday for the other weeks.

The manuscript is bound in red velvet, and according to Scrivener in excellent preservation.

== History ==
Scrivener dated the manuscript to the 13th century, and Gregory to the 13th or 14th century. It has been assigned by the Institute for New Testament Textual Research (INTF) to the 11th century.

The manuscript was added to the list of New Testament manuscripts by Scrivener (number 186^{e}) and Gregory (number 278^{e}). Gregory saw the manuscript in 1886.

The manuscript is not cited in the critical editions of the Greek New Testament (UBS3).

The codex is housed at the Istituto Ellenico di Studi Bizantini e Postbizantini (B') in Venice, Italy.

== See also ==
- List of New Testament lectionaries
- Biblical manuscript
- Textual criticism
- Lectionary 277

== Bibliography ==
- Gregory, Caspar René (1900). Textkritik des Neuen Testaments. Vol. 1. Leipzig: Hinrichs. p. 411.
