= Lectionary 283 =

Lectionary ℓ 283
- New Testament manuscript
- Text: Evangelistarium
- Date: 11th century
- Script: Greek
- Now at: Biblioteca Communale (Siena)
- Size: 36.5 cm by 30.5 cm
- Type: Byzantine text-type
- Note: musical notes

Lectionary 283, designated by siglum ℓ 283 (in the Gregory-Aland numbering) is a Greek manuscript of the New Testament, on parchment. Palaeographically it has been assigned to the 11th century. Scrivener labelled it as 162^{e}.

The manuscript has complex contents, without any lacunae.

== Description ==
The codex contains lessons from the Gospel of John, Matthew, and Luke (Evangelistarium). The manuscript contains weekday Gospel lessons.

The text is written in Greek minuscule letters, on 313 parchment leaves (36.5 cm by 30.5 cm), in two columns per page, 23 lines per page. The large initial letters are decorated.

The first five columns of the manuscript are written in gold. It contains musical notes and pictures.

The text of Christ's agony at Gethsemane (Luke 22:43-44) is marked by an obelus as a doubtful.

== History ==
Scrivener and Gregory dated the manuscript to the 11th or 12th century. It has been assigned by the Institute for New Testament Textual Research (INTF) to the 11th century.

According to the note on the page 288 the manuscript was bought in Constantinople by Peter, merchant from Florence, who was agent of the Emperor John Cantacuzenus (1341–1355). Andrew di Grazia, curator of the hospital of Santa Maria della Scala in Siena bought it in 1359 and it was housed in this hospital. In 1785 it came to the library Communale in Siena.

The manuscript was added to the list of New Testament manuscripts by Scrivener (number 162^{e}) and Gregory (number 283^{e}). Gregory saw the manuscript in 1886.

The manuscript is not cited in the critical editions of the Greek New Testament (UBS3).

The codex is housed at the Biblioteca Communale (X. IV. 1) in Siena.

== See also ==
- List of New Testament lectionaries
- Biblical manuscript
- Textual criticism
- Lectionary 275

== Bibliography ==
- Gregory, Caspar René (1900). Textkritik des Neuen Testaments, Vol. 1. Leipzig: J.C. Hinrichs’sche Buchhandlung. p. 411.
