= Moon Child (video game) =

1997 video game

- Developer: The Games Department
- Publishers: Valkieser Publishing (Windows); Klaar Mobile Entertainment (Windows Mobile)
- Designers: Metin Seven; Reinier van Vliet
- Programmers: Reinier van Vliet; Peter Schaap
- Artist: Metin Seven
- Composers: Ramon Braumuller; Stefan Alfrink (Windows Mobile)
- Platforms: Windows; Windows Mobile iOS macOS
- Release: October 4, 1997 (Windows); July 1, 2004 (Windows Mobile); 2012 (iOS); July 20, 2018 (macOS)
- Genres: Side-scrolling, platformer
- Mode: Single-player

Moon Child is a 1997 side-scrolling platform video game developed by Team Hoi and published by Valkieser Publishing for Microsoft Windows. Initially developed for the Amiga, the game was moved to Windows due to the declining popularity of the platform. The game's story follows a small elf, who is tasked with saving the planet Utopia from a destructive techno-virus.

== Plot ==
Moon Child, a green elf, is sent by the moon to protect the planet Utopia. One night, a meteor crashes on the planet. The meteor carries an infectious techno-virus that starts to transform the planet's environment into a lifeless, mechanical world. Moon Child sets off on a quest to stop the spread of the virus and save the planet.

== Gameplay ==
The player controls Moon Child to guide him through four environmental worlds. Moon Child moves when the "Left" and "Right" cursor keys are pressed or the joystick is moved left or right. Pressing the space bar or joystick button makes him jump. The first three environments are each split into themed levels with obstacles, hazards, and enemies: Environment 1 is set in an uninfected area of Utopia when the meteor has not yet crashed on the planet; Environment 2 takes place at a decaying construction site, emphasising the incoming threat of the techno-virus; and Environment 3 is set in a "Techno-Fortress", in which Moon Child flies using a jetpack. Moon Child will encounter gimmicks like hydraulic levers, which can be switched to open doors; "Warps" to transport himself to a different location, and "Jumpers" and "Pushers" to reach higher places and launch him forwards. Scattered around each level are "Dark Diamonds", which Moon Child must collect. Collecting 77 out of 84 Dark Diamonds is required to progress to Environment 4, which contains a psychedelic level where Moon Child uses the Diamonds to fight the virus' abstract heart.

== Development ==
In late 1991, while Team Hoi were finalizing the development of their Amiga game Hoi, graphics artist Metin Seven drew his first concept designs for an elf character. Following bad experiences with publishers Innerprise Software and Hollyware Entertainment not paying them royalties, the developers were determined to make a platform game based around the elf. Development of the game began in 1992–1993, initially planned as a spiritual successor to Hoi. (Note: Attributed to multiple references:) The game was designed by Seven and Reinier van Vliet; Seven handled the graphics and Van Vliet did the programming. Peter Schaap programmed the game's title intro. The visual look of the game was inspired by Three Wonders' Midnight Wanderers and Ghosts 'n Goblins. Seven initially planned an animation of Moon Child jumping into the foreground for the game's title screen, but this concept went unused. The game was originally planned to have a darker story, in which Moon Child was to live in a Gothic castle. Seven designed artwork for the story in Imagine and Deluxe Paint. The story would have also included a "Moon Princess" character. Moon Child originally had a tunic, shoes, an elvish hat and a tuft of hair, but was redesigned to wear a onesie in order to keep the character "minimalistic" and fit the game's smooth scrolling mechanics. His running and jumping sprites were animated using guides from Preston Blair's Cartoon Animation book as reference. To make the character blink without multiplying the number of sprites, Van Vliet reserved a specific shade of magenta for Moon Child's eye sockets and projected an independent blink animation onto that color during gameplay. Moon Child's sprites were used as a template for Benny, the protagonist in Peanutbutter Power Game, due to that game's tight deadline. The game's initial intro theme music was composed by Van Vliet. The titular character from Hoi was planned to appear as Moon Child's sidekick, but was later scrapped. The jetpack concept was repurposed from the developers' cancelled game Ragnov. A shooter level with a bird and bats was planned for inclusion in the game, but went unused.

Ramon Braumuller composed the title theme music, taking inspiration from Amiga demoscene music trackers and producing house music with his brother Ruud Braumuller as "The R". He also performed the vocals for the theme and recorded them onto a VHS tape with an ADAT multitrack-recorder, then loaded the sample into Digital Mugician on the Amiga, a music editor created by the developers. Other samples used in the theme included dialogue from The Adventures of Superman and Dragnet, and a vocal from "Me and Baby Brother" by War, all lifted from the sample CDs Beats, Breaks & Scratches Volume 5 and Beats, Breaks & Scratches Volume 6 by Simon Harrris.

During Team Hoi's attendance at The Party, Seven created a drawing for the team's development table that depicted Moon Child restraining Sega's Sonic the Hedgehog. According to Seven, the illustration was done because of the team's frustration with the recently released Sonic the Hedgehog for the Sega Genesis. He noted that Sonic had similar gameplay elements to Hoi, but heavily emphasized speed, and its release coincided with a period where Team Hoi was not receiving royalties from Innerprise. Moon Child would also be included in Team Hoi's demo Hoi sAGA Demo III: The Final Chapter in 1994.

The game was initially pitched to Psygnosis and planned for release on the AGA models of the Amiga platform. However, in 1994, it was cancelled due to a lack of budget as a result of publisher Rasputin Software not paying them royalties for Clockwiser, and the decreasing popularity and discontinuation of the Amiga. In the autumn of 1995, Seven and Van Vliet made an agreement with Valkieser Publishing to start a game development division called "The Games Department", and switched development of the game to Windows, (Note: Attributed to multiple references:) which lasted for 18 months. The Amiga demo's graphics and engine would be used for an interactive "micro-game" for the Dutch educational TV series Typisch Techniek. The developers used a high resolution of 640x480 pixels for Moon Child to allow for more detailed graphics. The game was programmed in C++ using Microsoft DirectX 5.0, running at a smooth 60 frames per second. The game's components, including the levels, animations, and audio, were driven by external configuration files (text and binary). Van Vliet developed an "actor"-based system for sprite management, in which every character had their own AI programming separate from the animation. To demonstrate the system, the developers created a walking construction helmet enemy for Environment 2 (a construction site), nicknamed "Helmut", who shared the same movement code as Moon Child. Moon Child's original design would make a cameo appearance in Environment 1. The game's 3D cutscenes were written, storyboarded and directed by Seven and animated in Alias Wavefront on Silicon Graphics systems by Viktor Rietveld and Riccardo Russo.

Braumuller was hired as a freelancer to compose a techno arrangement of the theme and original music and sound effects in the CD-ROM audio format for the Windows version, using a Roland Jupiter-8, an Elka Synthex, a Korg MS-20, a Dynacord ADS sampler, a Roland TB-303, and a Korg Wavestation and recording it on VHS with the ADAT recorder. Braumuller composed a track for the intro for the game's darker storyline, which went unused. Seven provided the vocals saying, "Game over!" in the track and Moon Child's grunt during gameplay when he hits an obstacle. One of the game's sound effects (a witch laughing) was taken from a stock sound effect CD.

Prior to Moon Child's release, Valkieser hired the Seattle-based company ST-Labs to playtest the game, and produced a commercial using gameplay footage, the 3D cutscenes and cover art, and raw in-game audio. Seven and Van Vliet gave a lecture and a two-week workshop on game development at the Faculty of Art, Media and Technology of the HKU University of the Arts Utrecht in Hilversum. The following month, the two developers ran a workshop during the annual Cinekid Festival at De Balie in Amsterdam.

== Release ==
Valkieser was looking for international distributors for Moon Child, with Sony and Fujitsu showing interest. However, the company ran into financial issues due to a failed investment in the CD-i, and later closed their publishing division. Moon Child was published by Valkieser in the Netherlands on October 4, 1997. Despite not being released internationally, pirated copies of the game were later found to have been distributed worldwide. Valkieser would later be absorbed into the facilities company United in 2002.

On July 1, 2004, Klaar Mobile Entertainment released the game on Windows Mobile/Pocket PC. The music was composed by Stefan Alfrink using Van Vliet's music editor Syntrax. The game was released for iOS in 2012, and on the macOS App Store on July 20, 2018.

== Reception ==
Moon Child received positive reviews upon release. In September 1997, one month prior to its release, the game was nominated for an EMMA Award at MIPTV's MILIA festival in Cannes. CD-ROM Special praised the game's animations and gimmicks, describing it as "all really fun and, above all, remarkably easy to play". TV-Krant gave the game a rating of 9/10. The Windows Mobile version also received positive reviews.

== Resurgence ==
In April 2026, Metin Seven sent the Amiga demo to the website Games That Weren't. The website also uploaded a video of the demo's gameplay with the theme song. The video and song became viral on Bluesky, and led to Internet memes, videos and fan art. The game received positive reviews, being praised for its visuals and gameplay, and gaining recognition among enthusiasts of retro and abandonware titles. Seven, Van Vliet and Braumuller appreciated the game's unexpected resurgence, feeling that it made up for their bad luck with the publishers of their previous games. Seven and Van Vliet released the source code on the Internet Archive and Bitbucket. The game received a modern port for Microsoft Windows and Linux, titled Moon Child FE ("Friend Edition") and released by programmer Mors. The port would be made playable on Mac by Mac Source Port. In May–August 2026, an MS-DOS port named Moon Child DE ("DOS Edition") was released by programmer FrenkelS.
