= Charlene Soraia =

English musician (born 1988)

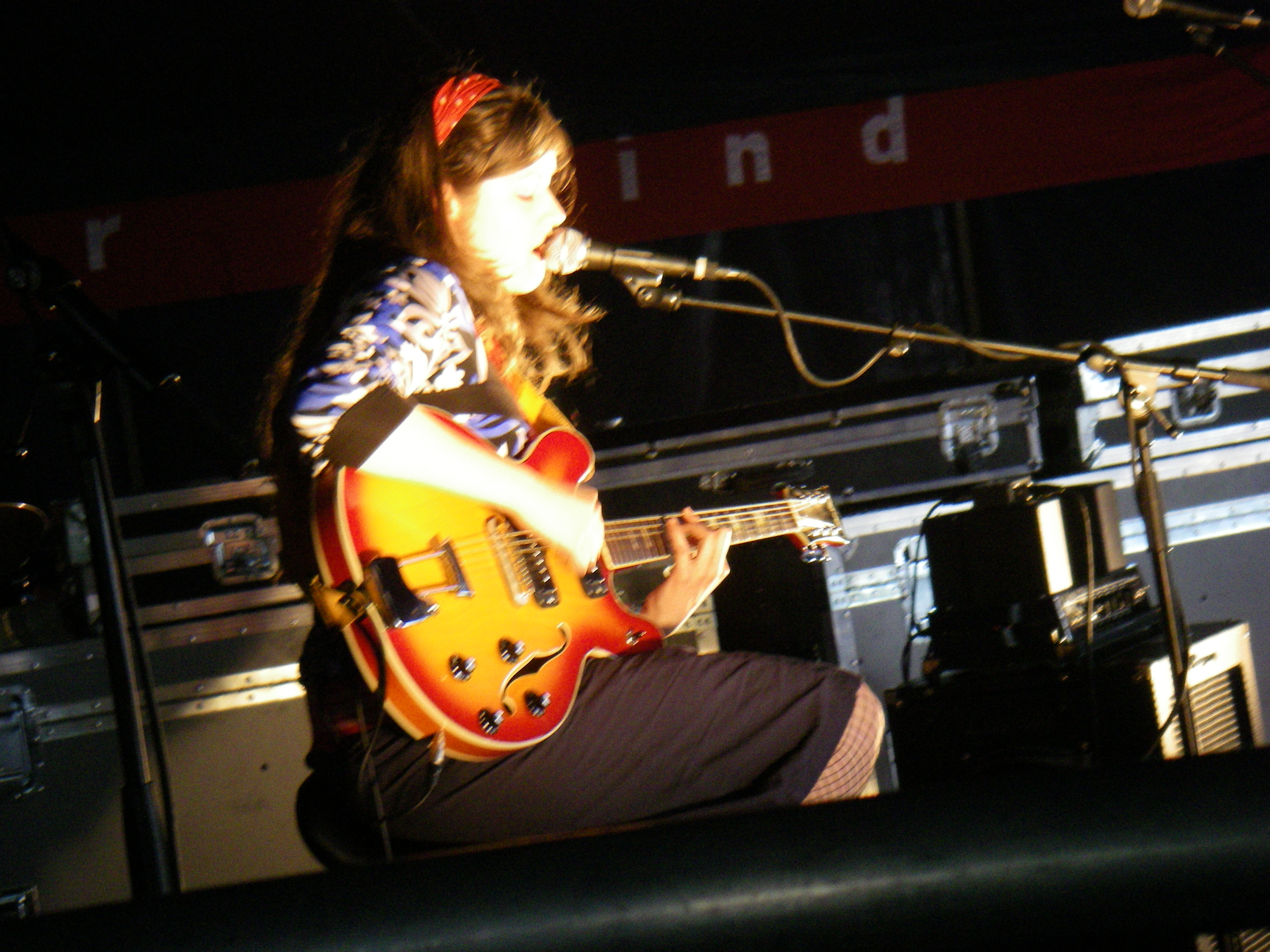
- Soraia performing in 2007

Background information
- Born: Charlene Soraia Santaniello Jones; 19 July 1988 (age 38); Sydenham, Lewisham, London, England
- Genres: Pop, acoustic, folk
- Occupation: Singer-songwriter
- Instruments: Vocals, guitars, piano
- Years active: 2004—present
- Label: Peacefrog
- Website: charlenesoraia.com

Charlene Soraia Santaniello Jones (born 17 July 1988) is an English singer-songwriter. She first became known with a cover of the Calling's "Wherever You Will Go", which peaked at number 3 in the UK Singles Chart. She released her debut studio album, Moonchild, in November 2011, which features "Wherever You Will Go" as a bonus track. She released her second studio album, Love Is the Law, in September 2015, which features the singles "Ghost", "Broken", "Caged", and "I'll Be There".

== Early life ==
Born and raised in Sydenham, London Borough of Lewisham in London, Charlene Soraia grew up with her parents. She first picked up her father's guitar at the age of 5, and played her first show at 8. She was inspired by artists such as David Bowie, The Beatles, Pink Floyd and King Crimson, and was very interested in the prog-rock genre.

While still at school, Soraia used to appear at open mic night at The Studio, Beckenham, Bromley in London around 2004, where her style and songwriting were still developing. She used the time before her performances to do her homework.

She attended into the BRIT School alongside future chart artists Adele and Kate Nash. While being there, she formed a rock band called Retrospect, with whom she released an EP entitled Long Hair, Short Memories. She also joined a psychedelic blues band, Electriq Mistress. At the same time she released a solo EP, "Lemonade", which was mainly created to get her bookings. She began performing as a solo artist in 2008, releasing further EPs Daffodils and Other Idylls (March 2008); Postcards from iO later in the year and third in the series, One of the Sun. The former reached the top of the UK Folk Chart on iTunes. An iTunes Live Sessions EP was also released after she performed at the festival in early 2008.

== Career ==
Soraia became noticed by a mainstream audience in 2011 when her cover of "Wherever You Will Go" by the Calling was featured in a Twinings commercial. The song was subsequently released as a digital download on iTunes and reached number 2 on the UK Singles Downloads Chart and number 3 in the UK Singles Chart. The original version of the song, which itself peaked at number 3 in the UK in June 2002 from the album "Camino Palmero", also re-entered the top 40 as a result, this time reaching number 16. Her debut album Moonchild, featuring the song as a bonus track, was released on 21 November 2011. On 10 January 2013, Soraia released the video for her song "Ghost". On 21 July 2014, she released another video for her song "Caged". And on 11 September 2015, she released her second studio album Love Is the Law.

== Personal life ==
Soraia has been diagnosed with bipolar disorder, specifically stating that she has cyclothymia. which she describes as a less severe form of bipolar disorder. [..] I wrote [a song on the LP called] 'Bipolar' and it came out really upbeat and funny despite the fact I was actually in pieces. [...]

== Discography ==
=== Studio albums ===
Title	Album details	Peak chart positions
Title	Album details	UK
Moonchild	Released: 21 November 2011; Label: Peacefrog Records; Formats: CD, digital download	83
Love Is the Law	Release: 11 September 2015; Label: Peacefrog Records; Formats: CD, digital download	—
Where's My Tribe	Release: 25 January 2019; Label: Peacefrog Records; Formats: CD, digital download	—

=== Singles ===
Year	Song	Peak chart positions			Certifications	Album
Year	Song	UK	FR	IRE	Certifications	Album
2011	"Wherever You Will Go"	3	145	20	UK: Platinum	Moonchild and Love Is the Law
2011	"Bipolar"	—	—	—		Moonchild
2013	"Ghost"	—	—	—		Love Is the Law
2013	"Broken"	—	—	—		Love Is the Law
2014	"Caged"	—	—	—		Love Is the Law
2015	"I'll Be There"	—	—	—		Love Is the Law
2018	"Where's My Tribe"	—	—	—		Where's My Tribe
2019	"Tragic Youth"	—	—	—		Where's My Tribe
2019	"Now You Are with Her"	—	—	—		Where's My Tribe
2019	"Temptation"	—	—	—		Where's My Tribe
"—" denotes releases that did not chart or not released yet.
