= Lectionary 274 =

Lectionary ℓ 274
- New Testament manuscript
- Text: Evangelistarium
- Date: 16th century
- Script: Greek
- Now at: Biblioteca Marciana
- Size: 21.5 cm by 15.5 cm
- Type: Byzantine text-type

Lectionary 274, designated by siglum ℓ 274 (in the Gregory-Aland numbering) is a Greek manuscript of the New Testament, on paper. Palaeographically it has been assigned to the 16th century. It used to be known as Nanianus 202. The manuscript has complex contents.

== Description ==
The codex contains lessons from the Gospel of John, Matthew, Luke (Evangelistarium), and from the Acts, Catholic epistles, and Pauline epistles (Apostolarion). It contains text of the Pericope Adulterae.

The text is written in Greek minuscule letters, on 501 paper leaves (21.5 cm by 15.5 cm), in one column per page, 19 lines per page.

The manuscript contains weekday Gospel/Apostolos lessons from Easter to Pentecost and Saturday/Sunday Gospel lessons for the other weeks.

== History ==
The manuscript has been assigned by the INTF to the 16th century.

According to the colophon it was written by Emanuel Casimati in 1580.

The manuscript was added to the list of New Testament manuscripts by and Gregory (number 274^{e}). Gregory saw the manuscript in 1886.

The manuscript was examined and described by Carlo Castellani (as lectionary 264).

The manuscript is not cited in the critical editions of the Greek New Testament (UBS3).

The codex is housed at the Biblioteca Marciana (Gr. II,143 (1381)) in Venice.

== See also ==
- List of New Testament lectionaries
- Biblical manuscript
- Textual criticism
- Lectionary 273

== Bibliography ==
- Gregory, Caspar René (1900). Textkritik des Neuen Testaments. Vol. 1. Leipzig: Hinrichs. p. 410.
- Carlo Castellani, Catalogus codicum graecorum qui in bibliothecam D. Marci Venetiarum inde ab anno MDCCXL ad haec usque tempora inlati sunt, Venedig 1895, pp. 76–78
