= Moonchild (Celtus album) =

Studio album by Celtus
- Released: 1997
- Genre: Celtic music
- Label: Sony Records
- Producer: Rupert Hine

Celtus chronology
Moonchild (1997)	Portrait (1999)

Moonchild is the 1997 debut album of Irish folk rock band Celtus, led by the McManus brothers Pat and John. The album is dedicated to their brother Tommy of the Mama's Boys who appears in previously unused recording footage on two tracks. Celtus performed tracks from the album opening for Sheryl Crow at three U.K. dates of her 1997 tour including the Royal Albert Hall show.

== Track listing ==
1. Strange Day in the Country
2. Moonchild
3. Every Step of the Way
4. Some Kind of Wonder
5. Brother's Lament
6. Beyond the Dark
7. Love Turns to Dust
8. Rosa-Ree
9. The Pilgrim
10. Trikuti
11. We Two Are One
