= Lectionary 273 =

Lectionary ℓ 273
- New Testament manuscript
- Text: Evangelistarium
- Date: 13th century
- Script: Greek
- Now at: Biblioteca Marciana
- Size: 23.5 cm by 18.5 cm
- Type: Byzantine text-type

Lectionary 273, designated by siglum ℓ 273 (in the Gregory-Aland numbering) is a Greek manuscript of the New Testament, on parchment. Palaeographically it has been assigned to the 13th century.

It used to be known as Nanianus 38. The manuscript has no complex contents.

== Description ==
The codex contains some lessons from the Gospel of Matthew (Evangelistarium). The text is written in Greek minuscule letters, on 9 parchment leaves (23.5 cm by 18.5 cm), in two columns per page, 23 lines per page. The manuscript contains weekday Gospel lessons.

== History ==
Gregory dated the manuscript to the 13th century. It has been assigned by the Institute for New Testament Textual Research (INTF) to the 13th century.

The manuscript was added to the list of New Testament manuscripts by Gregory (number 273^{e}). Gregory saw the manuscript in 1886.

The manuscript is not cited in the critical editions of the Greek New Testament (UBS3).

The codex is housed at the Biblioteca Marciana (Gr. II,17 (1295), fol. 5-13) in Venice, Italy.

== See also ==
- List of New Testament lectionaries
- Biblical manuscript
- Textual criticism
- Lectionary 272

== Bibliography ==
- Gregory, Caspar René (1900). Textkritik des Neuen Testaments. Vol. 1. Leipzig: Hinrichs. p. 410.
