= Lectionary 277 =

Lectionary ℓ 277
- New Testament manuscript
- Text: Evangelistarium
- Date: 15th century
- Script: Greek
- Now at: Biblioteca Marciana
- Size: 32 cm by 25.2 cm
- Type: Byzantine text-type
- Note: illuminated

Lectionary 277, designated by siglum ℓ 277 (in the Gregory-Aland numbering) is a Greek manuscript of the New Testament, on paper. Palaeographically it has been assigned to the 15th century. Frederick Henry Ambrose Scrivener labelled it as 183^{e},

The manuscript has complex contents.

== Description ==
The codex contains lessons from the Gospel of John, Matthew, and Luke (Evangelistarium).

The text is written in Greek minuscule letters, on 387 paper leaves (32 cm by 25.5 cm), in two columns per page, 19 lines per page. The manuscript contains weekday Gospel lessons.

== History ==
According to the colophon the manuscript was written in 1459. It has been assigned by the Institute for New Testament Textual Research to the 15th century.

The name of the scribe was Sophronius at Ferrara. The manuscript came from Constantinople.

The manuscript was added to the list of New Testament manuscripts by Scrivener (number 183^{e}) and Gregory (number 276^{e}). The manuscript was examined by Dean Burgon. Gregory saw the manuscript in 1886.

The manuscript is not cited in the critical editions of the Greek New Testament (UBS3).

The codex is housed at the Biblioteca Marciana (Gr. I,55 (967)) in Venice.

== See also ==
- List of New Testament lectionaries
- Biblical manuscript
- Textual criticism
- Lectionary 276

== Bibliography ==
- Gregory, Caspar René (1900). Textkritik des Neuen Testaments. Vol. 1. Leipzig: Hinrichs. p. 410.
