= Biblioteca Comunale degli Intronati =

Library in Italy

- Biblioteca Comunale degli Intronati
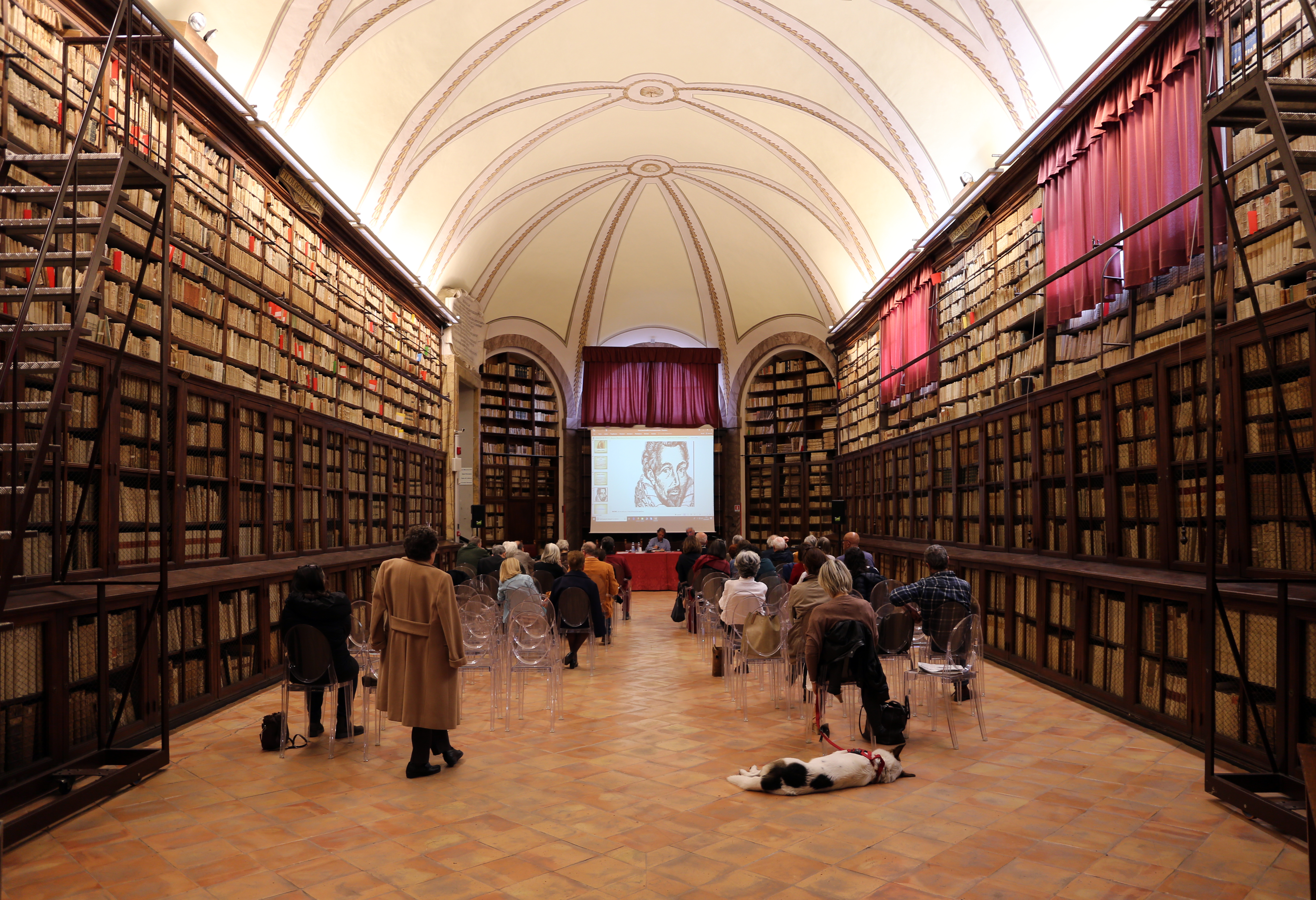
- The old reading room
- 43.3206°N 11.3295°E
- Location: Via della Sapienza 3, 53100 Siena, Italy
- Established: 1758, 1959

Collection
- Size: over 500,000

Other information
- Website: www.bibliotecasiena.it

The Biblioteca Comunale degli Intronati is the public library located at Via della Sapienza #3 of the comune of Siena, in Tuscany, Italy.

== History ==
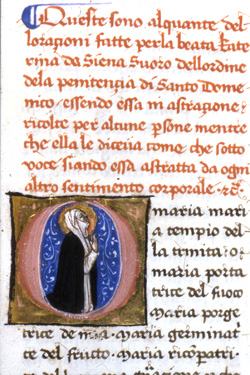
Saint Catherine praying, from Orazioni in volgare italiano, 15th century, Biblioteca Comunale Ms. T. II. 7, f. 161r

The library's origins date to 1758, when the archdeacon and local economist Sallustio Bandini donated his library to the University of Siena, on the condition that it grant public access. The university at this time lacked a formal library. In 1774, the library already included 13,000 objects. In 1798 an earthquake closed the library; it soon reopened but was closed by the French in 1808, along with the University of Siena. The library was restarted by the commune in 1810, and amassed further manuscripts from the suppressed convent of Sant'Agostino.

The collection over the centuries has been greatly enhanced by additional donors, including the manuscripts and designs owned by Giuseppe Ciaccheri (1724-1804), pupil of Bandini, and the first librarian of the collection. In 1786 the library received works housed in the Santa Maria della Scala (Siena), among them the precious Byzantine lectionary Gospels (designated by ℓ 283 on the list Gregory-Aland) already part of the treasure of the same institution (X. IV. 1). In 1866, the editor Giuseppe Porri left to the library his collection of stamps, signatures, coins, medals and signature seals. In 1932 the podestà of Siena, Fabio Bargagli Petrucci, became the administrator and added his collection of public documents, christening it with the name "Intronati", in memory of the Accademia degli Intronati of the 18th century.

Atop the entrance to the Historical Reading room of the library is a plaque with the six statutes of the old Accademia in Latin:

1. Deum colere (Revere God)
2. Studere (Study)
3. Gaudere (Rejoice)
4. Neminem lædere (Damage nobody)
5. Nemini credere (Believe nobody)
6. De mundo non curare (Worry not about the world).

In the 1990s reconstruction led to designation of a specific hall. Some material of the Museo archeologico nazionale was transferred to the former monastery adjacent to Santa Maria della Scala.

== Collection ==
In 1935 the collection of the library was estimated at 120,000 volumes, 86,000 brochures, 820 incunabula, 5,226 manuscripts, 20,000 autographs, and stamps. Currently, the library's collection of printed books and manuscripts is estimated at over half a million units. The archive of the library is divided in twenty-nine series. Special value have documents from the time of Renaissance and Reformation.

Among the collections are:

- Giuliano da Sangallo’s Sienese (ms. S. IV. 8) drawings and manuscripts made by the hand of Antonio di Pietro Averlino called Filarete (Trattato di architettura civile, ms. L. V. 9)
- Francesco di Giorgio Martini (Trattato d’architettura civile e militare, ms. S. IV. 4, and others) Notebooks with architectural and military designs
- Drawings and designs by Baldassarre Peruzzi and his school (the so-called Taccuino senese di Baldassarre Peruzzi, ms. S. IV. 7, and others)
- Drawings and designs by Beccafumi
- Saint Catherine of Siena's Spiritual Document (letter) (T. II. F - cc. 29-30)
- Luca Landucci's diary
- Papyrus document from Ravenna (7th century)
- Epistles of St Paul (11th-century) in Latin
- Quinto Curzio (15th-century)
- Roman Missal of Pope Enea Silvio Piccolomini (1456)
- Pontificale romano with French illumination added (15th-century)
- Monte Santo di Dio (15th-century incunabolo)
- Divine Comedy, incunabulum with illustrations designed by Sandro Botticelli (1481)
- Illuminated Antiphonary by Giovanni di Paolo
- Franciscan Breviary (15th-century) illuminated by Sano di Pietro
- Libro d'ore fiorentino miniato da Filippo de' Corbizzi (1494)
- Bust of Federigo Tozzi, by Ercole Drei on reading room.

== Bibliography ==
- Ennio Sandal (1990). "Endowed Municipal Public Libraries". Libraries & Culture. 25 (3: Libraries and Librarianship in Italy). USA: 358–371. JSTOR 25542275.
