= Mooncalf =

Monstrous birth, the abortive fetus of a cow or other farm animal

A mooncalf (or moon-calf) is a monstrous birth, the abortive fetus of a cow or other farm animal. The term was occasionally applied to an abortive human fetus.

The term derives from the once widespread superstition, present in many European folk traditions, that such malformed creatures were the product of the sinister influence of the Moon on fetal development. The earliest recorded use of the term was in 1565, referring to a human false pregnancy.

== Modern usage ==
The term came to refer to any monstrous or grotesque thing. Shakespeare, for instance, used the term to describe Caliban, the deformed servant of Prospero, in The Tempest.

In H. G. Wells's 1901 novel The First Men in the Moon, large creatures domesticated by the Selenites are referred to as "mooncalves".

"Mooncalf" is used as a derogatory term indicating someone is a dullard, fool, or otherwise not particularly bright or sharp. For example, W. C. Fields in The Bank Dick (1940) advises his prospective son-in-law to avoid being a "mooncalf" by buying shares he has been conned into believing are worth much more than the proffered price.

A mooncalf is also a magical creature in the world of the Harry Potter series. Fantastic Beasts and Where to Find Them describes a mooncalf as a shy, nocturnal creature with a smooth, pale-gray body, bulging eyes, and four spindly legs with large flat feet. Mooncalves perform dances in the moonlight and are apparently responsible for crop circles. In the film of the same name and its sequel, Newt Scamander's collection of creatures in his suitcase includes a herd of mooncalves.

In the fourth episode of the seventh season of The Big Bang Theory, Sheldon calls Amy a "dewy-eyed mooncalf".

Wilfred Maxwell, narrator and protagonist of occultist Dion Fortune's 1938 novel The Sea Priestess, refers several times to a mentally disabled character who falls into the sea and disappears as a "mooncalf".

This concept is also used by Christian Morgenstern in his Galgenlieder (1905).

In Embassytown (2011) by China Miéville, the protagonist refers to two characters as "mooncalf and quite impossible".

Arnold Bennett used the term in his novel These Twain (1916).

In chapter 24 of A Dance With Dragons, Jon Connington refers to himself as a mooncalf for not guarding Tyrion Lannister in Selhorys.

In "The Blue Cross," G.K. Chesterton's Father Brown speaks "with a mooncalf simplicity."

== See also ==
- Moonchild
- Homunculus
- Cambion
- Changeling
- Deformity
- Maternal impression
- Astrology
