= Lectionary 275 =

Lectionary ℓ 275
- New Testament manuscript
- Text: Evangelistarium
- Date: 12th century
- Script: Greek
- Now at: Biblioteca Marciana
- Size: 29.5 cm by 22.5 cm
- Type: Byzantine text-type
- Note: illuminated

Lectionary 275, designated by siglum ℓ 275 (in the Gregory-Aland numbering) is a Greek manuscript of the New Testament, on parchment. Palaeographically it has been assigned to the 12th century. Scrivener labelled it as 181^{e},

The manuscript has complex contents.

== Description ==
The codex contains lessons from the Gospel of John, Matthew, and Luke (Evangelistarium).

The text is written in Greek minuscule letters, on 303 parchment leaves (29.5 cm by 22.5 cm), in two column per page, 23 lines per page. It is "splendidly illuminated and bound in silver and enamel", but it is damaged by moisture.

The manuscript contains weekday Gospel lessons.

== History ==
Dean Burgon and Scrivener dated the manuscript to the 13th century, and Gregory to the 12th century. It has been assigned by the INTF to the 12th century.

The manuscript used to be held in the church of Saint Mark (as lectionary 276).

The manuscript was added to the list of New Testament manuscripts by Scrivener (number 181^{e}) and Gregory (number 275^{e}). Gregory saw the manuscript in 1886.

The manuscript is not cited in the critical editions of the Greek New Testament (UBS3).

The codex is housed at the Biblioteca Marciana (Gr. I,53 (966)) in Venice.

== See also ==
- List of New Testament lectionaries
- Biblical manuscript
- Textual criticism
- Lectionary 274

== Bibliography ==
- Gregory, Caspar René (1900). Textkritik des Neuen Testaments. Vol. 1. Leipzig: Hinrichs. p. 410.
