= Lectionary 271 =

Lectionary ℓ 271
- New Testament manuscript
- Text: Evangelistarium
- Date: 17th century
- Script: Greek
- Now at: Biblioteca Marciana
- Size: 17.9 cm by 13.8 cm
- Type: Byzantine text-type
- Note: poor condition

Lectionary 271, designated by siglum ℓ 271 (in the Gregory-Aland numbering) is a Greek manuscript of the New Testament, on paper. Palaeographically it has been assigned to the 17th century. Scrivener labelled it as 177^{e}, Gregory by 271^{e}. Formerly it was known as Nanianus 222. The manuscript has survived in a fragmentary condition.

== Description ==
The codex contains some lessons from the Gospel of Matthew (Evangelistarium).

The text is written in Greek minuscule letters, on 11 paper leaves (17.9 cm by 13.8 cm), in one column per page, 23-24 lines per page. Scrivener described the manuscript as "eleven poor leanes".

== History ==
Scrivener dated the manuscript to the 15th century, Gregory dated it to the 17th century. It is presently assigned by the INTF to the 17th century.

The manuscript was added to the list of New Testament manuscripts by Scrivener (number 177^{e}) and Gregory (number 271^{e}). Gregory saw the manuscript in 1886.

The manuscript is not cited in the critical editions of the Greek New Testament (UBS3).

Currently the codex is housed at the Biblioteca Marciana (Gr. I.51 (1419)) in Venice.

== See also ==
- List of New Testament lectionaries
- Biblical manuscript
- Textual criticism
- Lectionary 270

== Bibliography ==
- Gregory, Caspar René (1900). Textkritik des Neuen Testaments. Vol. 1. Leipzig: Hinrichs. p. 410.
