= Monster of Ravenna =

Mythical creature

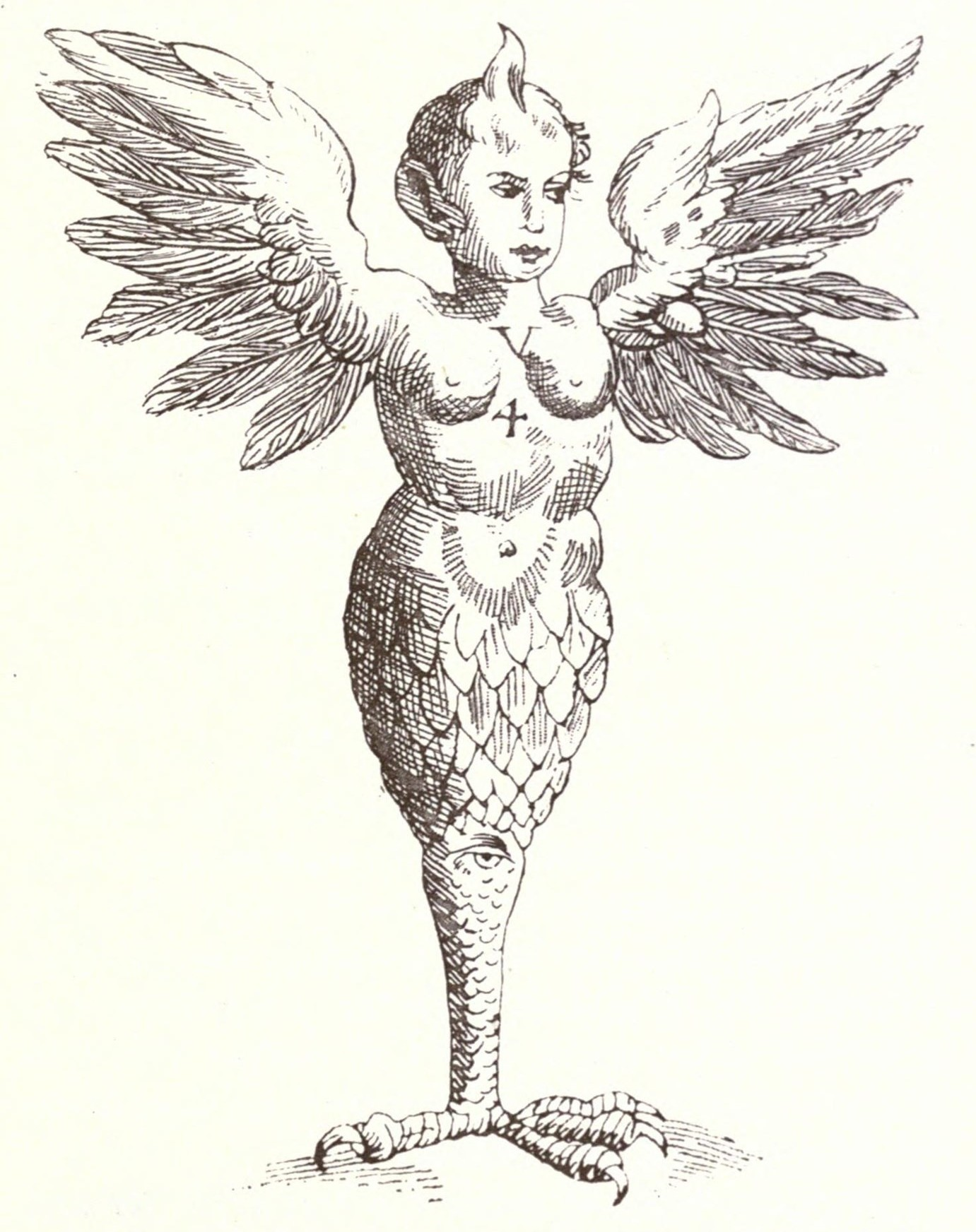
The Monster of Ravenna as depicted in Curious Creatures, John Ashton, 1890.

The Monster of Ravenna was a possibly apocryphal late Renaissance-era monstrous birth whose appearance in early 1512 near the city of Ravenna was widely reported in contemporary European pamphlets and diaries. Images of its grotesque features were interpreted symbolically by opponents of both the Catholic Church and the Protestant Reformation, although a more common explanation at the time was that the beast was an omen regarding the outcome of the Battle of Ravenna (1512). Modern medical consensus identifies the monster as a child with some variety of severe congenital disorder.

== History ==
The earliest account of the monster's existence is from the diarist Sebastiano di Branca Tedallini, who recorded on March 8 that news of a strange infant's birth had reached Pope Julius II in Rome. According to his account, the child was said to have been born of a nun and a friar, and was marked by a horned head, the letters YXV on its chest, and with one leg hairy and cloven-hoofed while the other leg's midsection grew a human eye. On March 11, the apothecary Luca Landucci documented how word of this incident had reached Florence; having apparently received a drawing of the monster, Landucci described it to possess features such as a single horn, the wings of a bat, hermaphroditic genitalia, an eye on its right knee and a clawed left foot like an eagle's. The tale was subsequently immortalized by further chroniclers of the era, including Johannes Multivallis, Jacques Rueff, Conrad Lycosthenes, Caspar Hedio, Pierre Boaistuau, Fortunio Liceti, and Ambroise Paré. Landucci's physical description seems to have been considered authoritative, as later chroniclers, particularly Boaistuau, largely reproduced his account word-for-word. (Note: Boaistuau's account includes the description of the eye on the knee and the clawed foot, but he has combined the two into a single leg. The text is otherwise nearly identical to Landucci's.)

In medieval Europe, it was common practice for malformed infants, especially those with little chance of survival, to be abandoned and left to die by starvation; this was done in Ravenna on the order of the Pope.

Even after its reported death, however, news of the monstrous birth continued to sweep Europe, often in stories greatly embellished by the storyteller. In a popular poem given by Marcello Palonio relatively soon after its birth, the monster is implied to possess two heads. With more time, the description of the Ravenna monster evolved, changing its number of legs from two to one and eventually syncretizing with the morality figure of Frau Welt. Giovanni Battista Bissoni was contracted to design the illustrations for the second edition of Fortunio Liceti's account, with the Monster of Ravenna centrally displayed on the frontispiece; by this point, the creature was well-established as possessing a single clawed foot.

A major element in the popularity of the "monster" was its appearance alongside similar signs and portents; the occurrence of other preternatural events was a major factor in convincing Landucci that this was not an isolated incident. In 1514, with the example of Ravenna still fresh in public memory, a so-called "Monster of Bologna" was reported. This child was born with two faces, three eyes, and a woman's vulva on its forehead. She lived long enough to be baptized as "Maria" but died four days later.

== Interpretation ==
The horn [indicates] pride; the wings, mental frivolity and inconstancy; the lack of arms, a lack of good works; the raptor's foot, rapaciousness, usury, and every sort of avarice; the eye on the knee, a mental orientation solely toward earthly things; the double sex, sodomy. And on account of these vices, Italy is shattered by the sufferings of war, which the King of France has not accomplished by his own power, but only as the scourge of God.

— Johannes Multivallis, Eusebii Caesariensis episcopi chronicon, 1512

Contemporary accounts sought to explain the "monster" and its unusual features in religious terms. The version proposed by Multivallis was fairly typical of the age; the recent Battle of Ravenna was a common theme in most texts produced very soon after the initial incident, being mentioned in both Landucci's report and that of Ambroise Paré, who tersely listed the Monster of Ravenna as an "Example of the Wrath of God" upon Pope Julius II and the people of Italy. Others emphasized the specific vice of sexual immorality, as Pietro Martire d'Anghiera recorded the belief that the monster was born the illegitimate child of a married mother.

During the Protestant Reformation, monstrous births and similar incidents were cited with political intent, most notably in the example of Luther's mooncalf. In the fifth volume of the anti-Lutheran Centvrien by Johann Nas, Martin Luther is himself identified with the Monster of Ravenna. Early woodcuts were produced by Protestants which depicted the child as having been born in a Florentine convent, the offspring of a nun and the Pope himself. This was followed by the more established narrative that the birth presaged the invasion of Louis XII as an agent of God's displeasure with Catholic power.

The Monster of Ravenna is referenced briefly in Mateo Alemán's novel Guzmán de Alfarache, which was published at the end of the seventeenth century. After protracted criticism of his own father for being sexually and religiously immoral, Guzmán invokes the grotesque imagery of the Monster as a being which transcends the societal norms of sex.

== Speculation on origins ==
Analyzing the later account of Ambroise Paré, Walton et al. proposed a tentative diagnosis of sirenomelia with related factors; (Note: This is based on Paré's assertion that the child had only one leg, per the later accounts of the Monster's appearance.) additionally, they emphasize possible indicators of hydrocephalus causing a bulging anterior fontanelle, radial hypoplasia with pterygium to give the impression of wings, and caudal regression, the latter of which may have been caused by diabetes mellitus in the mother. The "horned" forehead can alternatively be considered an instance of cyclopia. Finally, it is plausible that some of the more vivid features were caused by Roberts syndrome, which could have affected the development of the limbs and genitals.
