= Love Is the Law (Charlene Soraia album) =

Studio album by Charlene Soraia
- Released: 11 September 2015
- Recorded: 2012–2014
- Genre: Pop; acoustic; folk; synthpop
- Label: Peacefrog

Charlene Soraia chronology
Moonchild (2011)	Love Is the Law (2015)

Singles from Love Is the Law
- 1. "Ghost" Released: 18 March 2013; 2. "Broken" Released: 4 August 2013; 3. "Caged" Released: 21 July 2014; 4. "I'll Be There" Released: 9 March 2015

Love Is the Law is the second studio album by English singer-songwriter Charlene Soraia. It was released on 11 September 2015 by Peacefrog Records. The album features the singles "Ghost", "Broken", "Caged", and "I'll Be There".

== Singles ==
- "Ghost" was released as the album's lead single on 18 March 2013. This song was co-written by the performer's ex-boyfriend, Jon Allen.
- "Broken" was released as the album's second single on 4 August 2013. This song was co-written by Ricky Ross and Francis White.
- "Caged" was released as the album's third single on 21 July 2014. This song was co-written by Jim Eliot.
- "I'll Be There" was released as the album's fourth single on 9 March 2015.

== Track listing ==
No.	Title	Length
1.	"I'll Be There"	3:49
2.	"Caged"	3:32
3.	"Innocent"	3:32
4.	"Treasure"	3:15
5.	"Love Is the Law"	3:26
6.	"Ghost"	3:58
7.	"Jekyll & Hyde"	3:21
8.	"Halo"	3:15
9.	"Change"	4:45

Deluxe Edition
No.	Title	Length
10.	"Without Your Love"	3:28
11.	"The Space Between Us"	3:23
12.	"Alibi"	4:08
13.	"The Beast"	3:38
14.	"Hold Me"	4:02
15.	"Broken"	3:15
16.	"Standing Stone"	4:02
17.	"Wherever You Will Go"	3:18
