= Lectionary 272 =

Lectionary ℓ 272
- New Testament manuscript
- Text: Evangelistarium
- Date: 16th century
- Script: Greek
- Now at: Biblioteca Marciana
- Size: 26 cm by 19.5 cm
- Type: Byzantine text-type

Lectionary 272, designated by siglum ℓ 272 (in the Gregory-Aland numbering) is a Greek manuscript of the New Testament, on paper. Palaeographically it has been assigned to the 16th century. Scrivener labelled it as 178^{e}, Gregory as 272^{e}. Formerly it was known as Nanianus 223. The manuscript has complex contents.

== Description ==
The codex contains lessons from the Gospel of John, Matthew, and Luke (Evangelistarium). It contains text of the Pericope Adulterae.

The text is written in Greek minuscule letters, on 276 paper leaves (26.5 cm by 19.5 cm), in one column per page, 23 lines per page. It contains music notes.

The manuscript contains weekday Gospel lessons.

== History ==
Scrivener and Gregory dated the manuscript to the 16th century. It is presently assigned by the INTF to the 16th century.

Formerly it belonged to Papas Zankarol from Corfu.

The manuscript was added to the list of New Testament manuscripts by Scrivener (number 178^{e}) and Gregory (number 272^{e}). Gregory saw the manuscript in 1886.

The manuscript is not cited in the critical editions of the Greek New Testament (UBS3).

Currently the codex is housed at the Biblioteca Marciana (Gr. I.52 (1200)) in Venice.

== See also ==
- List of New Testament lectionaries
- Biblical manuscript
- Textual criticism
- Lectionary 271

== Bibliography ==
- Gregory, Caspar René (1900). Textkritik des Neuen Testaments. Vol. 1. Leipzig: Hinrichs. p. 410.
