= Hoi (video game) =

1992 video game

- Developer: Team Hoi
- Publishers: NA: Hollyware Entertainment; EU: Software Business
- Designers: Metin Seven; Reinier van Vliet
- Programmer: Reinier van Vliet
- Artist: Metin Seven
- Composer: Ramon Braumuller
- Platforms: Amiga, Microsoft Windows, macOS
- Release: Amiga: NA/EU: August 1992; Microsoft Windows, macOS: WW: May 2026
- Genre: Platform
- Mode: Single-player

Hoi is a 1992 platform video game developed by Team Hoi and published by Hollyware Entertainment in North America and Software Business in Europe for the Amiga. In the game, players assume the role of the titular lime green "Saur" character venturing into the "Madlands", an area within Hoi's home planet populated with obstacles, to face a ritual test of maturity and find a female partner.

Hoi received mostly favourable reception from the Amiga gaming press. Critics praised the audiovisual presentation, gameplay, character animations and puzzle-like elements but some felt mixed in regards to the controls while others criticized its idea, level design, forced memorization approach and collision detection.

In May 2026, programmer Reinier van Vliet released Hoi on Microsoft Windows and macOS, including with it several quality of life improvements; such as bugfixes, an improved camera view, a trainer allowing for unlimited lives, and a level select.

== Gameplay ==
Gameplay screenshot

Hoi is a platform game in a similar style as Super Mario Bros. and Sonic the Hedgehog. The plot revolves around the titular "Saur" character living on a planet in a far away solar system. As soon as the male inhabitants of his planet have reached maturity, each of them cannot escape to face the ultimate ritual test. They have to defy the "Madlands", a large area of Hoi's planet littered with all kinds of dangers. If they survive the quest and manage to reach the other side, they will enter the female part of the planet, with predominantly pleasant consequences. The ritual maturity test was established by Hoi's forefathers and serves as a trial to separate the real men from the boys. Hoi sets his teeth and stoutheartedly enters the ultimate challenge.

The player takes control of Hoi through five stages of varying thematic. Some of the stages featured are linear in nature, populated with obstacles and enemies, requiring the player to traverse the stage by running, jumping and climbing while avoiding harmful enemies and obstacles, while other levels that are featured later in the game become more maze-like and exploratory, making the player take different routes and teleports to reach the end. The third and fourth stages requires Hoi to equip himself with a jet-pack and scuba diving. Along the way, the player collects diamonds and gold for bonus points and extra lives. The title uses a checkpoint system in which a downed single player will respawn at the beginning of the checkpoint they managed to reach before dying. Getting hit by enemies, colliding against stage obstacles, falling off the stage, running out of air or being blown up by a bomb will result in losing a live and once all lives are lost, the game is over.

== Development and release ==
Game situation concepts for Hoi, showing ideas that would later be used or scrapped in the final game, such as a two-player mode.

Hoi was developed by Team Hoi (previously Soft Eyes), a group of three young Dutch game developers: programmer Reinier van Vliet, artist Metin Seven and composer Ramon Braumuller, who worked on the shoot 'em up Venom Wing for the Amiga and recounted its creation process and history through various publications. (Note: Attributed to multiple references:) The project was conceived in 1990 during a gathering at Seven's house. Seven owned a cat named Mickey, whom he would greet by saying, "Hoi, Mickey!" (Dutch for "Hi, Mickey!"), later simply referring to him as "Hoi". He was playing with Deluxe Paint and drew a green character that would become the protagonist of their next release titled Hoi: Let's Play!. The team were determined to create their "pièce de resistance" and settled with a cute platform game after Venom Wing programmer Pieter Opdam left the team to work at Team17.

Work on the project bearing the name of the character began in autumn of 1990, with Seven sketching game ideas on paper notepad pages using ballpen, some of which were never implemented in the final release, including a split-screen two-player mode. Seven stated that the team created and implemented new ideas on-the-fly without the use of storyboards or other elements that would have constrained the team with marking the game during development. He stated that the development period of the title "marked one of the best times of our lives", as the team had fun creating several game situations and reinforced their friendship but he also claimed that the group did not realize how difficult the final product turned out. The game was programmed in 68000 Assembly. The music was made using Digital Mugician, a music editor created by the developers. The game's fifth and final stage, a psychedelic level, was inspired by the Amiga demoscene and house/dance party culture, which resulted in Hoi becoming the first video game with an epilepsy warning.

Hoi was initially let down by publisher Innerprise Software, but was eventually released by Hollyware Entertainment (formerly MicroIllusions) in North America and Software Business in Europe in August 1992. However, Team Hoi did not receive much money from their contract with Hollyware and decided to release a special freeware remix version for the AGA Amiga system range in 1993.

== Reception ==
Reception

Review scores
Publication	Score
Aktueller Software Markt	8/12
Amiga Action	76%
Amiga Format	72%
Amiga Power	60%
Joystick	86%
VideoGames & Computer Entertainment	8/10
Amiga Joker	50%
Amiga Mania	87%
The One for Amiga Games	90%

Hoi received mostly favourable reception from the Amiga gaming press. Aktueller Software Markt's Klaus Trafford commended the audiovisual presentation and gameplay but criticized the level design. Joystick's Derek de la Fuente praised the graphics, sound, character animations and controls. Amiga Action's Alan Bunker said the game was adequate for beginners, but that more advanced players should look elsewhere, stating that it plays like an edutainment title intended for a younger audience. Amiga Format felt it was playable and fun during a preview article, however Marcus Dyson criticized its forced memorization approach and unintelligent level design, stating that it failed with being an "addictively playable" title, but gave positive remarks to the character and graphics.

Amiga Joker's Richard Löwenstein commended the colorful graphics, music and puzzle-like elements but criticized its controls and overall idea, stating that "Hoi simply has too little good and new to offer, even if you include the "stroboscopic effect" that the (English) instructions for the final level promise." Amiga Mania's Huw Pryce thought a lot of effort was put into every aspect of the game. Amiga Power's Gary Penn called it "amazingly frustrating junk", criticizing its frustrating design and poor collision detection but ultimately liked playing the game. Amiga World's Peter Olafson regarded it as a very good "Super Mario Bros./Sonic the Hedgehog-type" title, praising the smooth scrolling, animated intro and colorful visuals but noted that more could be done to the main character's sprite. The One for Amiga Games' Jim Douglas concluded "Graphically, it's pretty standard fare. Regulation parallax backdrops scroll behind stone and wood foregrounds that we've seen many times before. But even here there are plenty of innovative touches, such as the stage where platforms are hidden in the parallax background and only available when Hoi moves, making an otherwise predictable ascent up a narrow shaft positively gripping." Douglas also added positive comments to the sound, arcade-like playability and longevity.
