= Clockwiser =

1994 video game

- Developer: Team Hoi Games
- Publisher: Rasputin Software
- Platforms: Amiga, CD32, MS-DOS, Java, Android, iOS
- Release: EU: 1994
- Genre: Puzzle

Clockwiser is a video game, developed by Team Hoi for the Amiga, MS-DOS and Microsoft Windows. It was published in 1994 by Rasputin Software.

There are over hundred levels, which consist of various arrangements of blocks. Each level is divided into two sections, an active one on the left and a static one on the right. The player's task is to make the section on the left look exactly like the one on the right. The player cannot move individual blocks directly; instead, the player can select a rectangle-shaped group of blocks and move them along the rectangle's edge, either clockwise or counterclockwise. The blocks are subject to gravity, so moving a block on top of empty space makes it fall down. On later levels, various other objects come into play, such as metal blocks that can't be moved, teleporters, and bombs which destroy blocks they fall on.

== Legacy ==
In 2008, the game was ported to Java and published online. In 2010, the game was ported to Android. In 2014, the game was ported to iOS, making the game available on post iPad, iPhone and iPod Touch devices.
