= Celtus (band) =

Celtis new age band

Celtus was a Celtic new age band founded by brothers Pat and John McManus of Mama's Boys. Their sound was described by their manager as "Pink Floyd meets Clannad meets Enigma." The band worked with Nick Beggs, Rupert Hine, Gary Barnacle, Stephen W Tayler, Neil Bennett and have been on the list of Ayreon guest musicians. Celtus have been hosted by the Classic Rock Society. After recording two studio albums for Sony S2, the band were dropped by the label. They recorded two further studio albums and a live album on the Shamrock label before disbanding.

John McManus retired but Pat returned to hard rock and started "The Pat McManus Band" which play regular shows containing original material, Mama's Boys songs and covers of classics. John McManus has occasionally joined the band on stage, notably as guest vocalist and bass player for the Mama's Boys standard "Needle In The Groove".

== Discography ==
Albums:

- Moonchild, 1997
- Portrait, 1999
- Rooted, 2000
- Live 2000, 2000
- What Goes Around..., 2001
