= Team Hoi =

Defunct Dutch video game developer team

- Formerly: Electronic Audio Recordings (1988); Soft Eyes (1988–1992)
- Type: Private
- Industry: Video games
- Founded: 1988; 38 years ago
- Defunct: 2003
- Fate: Dissolved
- Headquarters: Netherlands
- Products: Hoi; Clockwiser; Moon Child
- Number of employees: 4 (1988–2003)
- Website: teamhoi.com

Team Hoi (originally Soft Eyes) was a Dutch team of video game developers that was active from the 1980s to the 2000s. Formed by and consisting of graphics artist Metin Seven, programmers Reinier van Vliet and Pieter Opdam, and composer Ramon Braumuller, the group became one of the earliest independent developers to produce commercial titles for the Amiga and other 16-bit systems in the Netherlands.

The team gained international recognition with their 1992 platform game Hoi, which was praised by computer magazines, and created their own custom music editors, SIDmon and Digital Mugician. They developed many other games in the 1980s and 1990s, including Peanutbutter Power Game, one of the first Dutch video games created specifically for corporate marketing; the puzzle games Cognition and Clockwiser, and the side-scrolling platformer Moon Child.

== History ==
Growing up in Bussum, Metin Seven (born in Brussels, Belgium) developed an interest in films, music and comics. In 1985, he was part of a Commodore 64 demoscene group called the Bithacker Cracking Team (BCT). He started making pixel art on the Commodore 64 using the editor Koala Painter. In 1987, Seven got in contact with Reinier van Vliet (born on 28 August 1971), a programmer in Alphen aan den Rijn, through Arnold van der Veen Meerstadt, who responded to a newspaper advertisement where Seven offered his Amiga 1000 for sale to buy the then-recently released Amiga 2000. As early Amiga owners, Veen Meerstadt and Seven stayed in touch, and the former went to high school with Van Vliet and Pieter Opdam, who were already programming games for the Amiga. Van Vliet had already developed several internationally-released games by then, such as the Amiga game Bouncer, published by Diamond Software in 1987. Seven's experience of playing Commodore 64 games like Impossible Mission inspired him to become a game designer. He was looking for people to form a team, and wrote a letter to Van Vliet about it. Van Vliet and Opdam agreed, and they, along with Seven and Naarden-based composer Ramon Braumuller (born on 7 January 1972), formed a team named Electronic Audio Recordings (E.A.R.), aiming to produce music for computer games using their self-made music editor, SIDmon. The team was later renamed Soft Eyes (also written as "SoftEyes"). Seven came up with the name, which was a pun on "soft ice" and a reference to visually appealing graphics, and inspired by other game developers using "soft" (from "software") in their names. Seven and Van Vliet travelled to London on weekends to establish contact with British publishers, including Ocean Software, Elite Systems, and Hewson Consultants, at the Personal Computer World Show and European Computer Trade Show. Seven sent letters and demo diskettes to potential foreign publishers, since there was no game publisher in the Netherlands at that time. However, they learned that the publishers were looking for developers of completed games in addition to music, so they became a game development team.

In addition to developing their first games, Seven, Van Vliet and Braumuller were also active as members of the Amiga demogroup The Digital Force International (DFI), creating a popular series of a cappella raps in the form of tracker modules in Protracker, composed of vocal sound samples. In 1990, Seven worked at Radarsoft, designing graphics for a Philips video wall at the Firato expo in the RAI Amsterdam, and Sleutelpositie ("Key Position"), a custom-made MS-DOS game for one of Radarsoft's clients. The assignments were managed by Cees Kramer and mediated by the Amsterdam-based agency Comic House. Seven worked at Comic House's studio on Mannetje and Mannetje, based on the photo comic of the same name by Hanco Kolk and Peter de Wit and broadcast on VPRO's Villa Achterwerk block from 1990 to 1994. He also created a Christmas greeting video with Wilbert Plijnaar, another artist at Comic House.

=== Ragnov ===
In 1988, Soft Eyes were developing their first Amiga game named Ragnov, a maze-based game in which the player was to control a character navigating a multi-directional scrolling environment using a jetpack. Ragnov had a split-screen multiplayer mode. They distributed a demo version of the game to several publishers. At the time, software distribution was done by copying floppy disks at meetings, sending them by mail, and via bulletin board systems. However, the game was canceled when Van Vliet lost all his source files due to a backup accident. Soft Eyes decided not to restart Ragnov and began development of Venom Wing in 1989. The game's concept was later repurposed for Hoi and Moon Child's third levels in 1992 and 1997, respectively, where the titular characters each use a jetpack to fly.

=== SIDmon and Digital Mugician ===
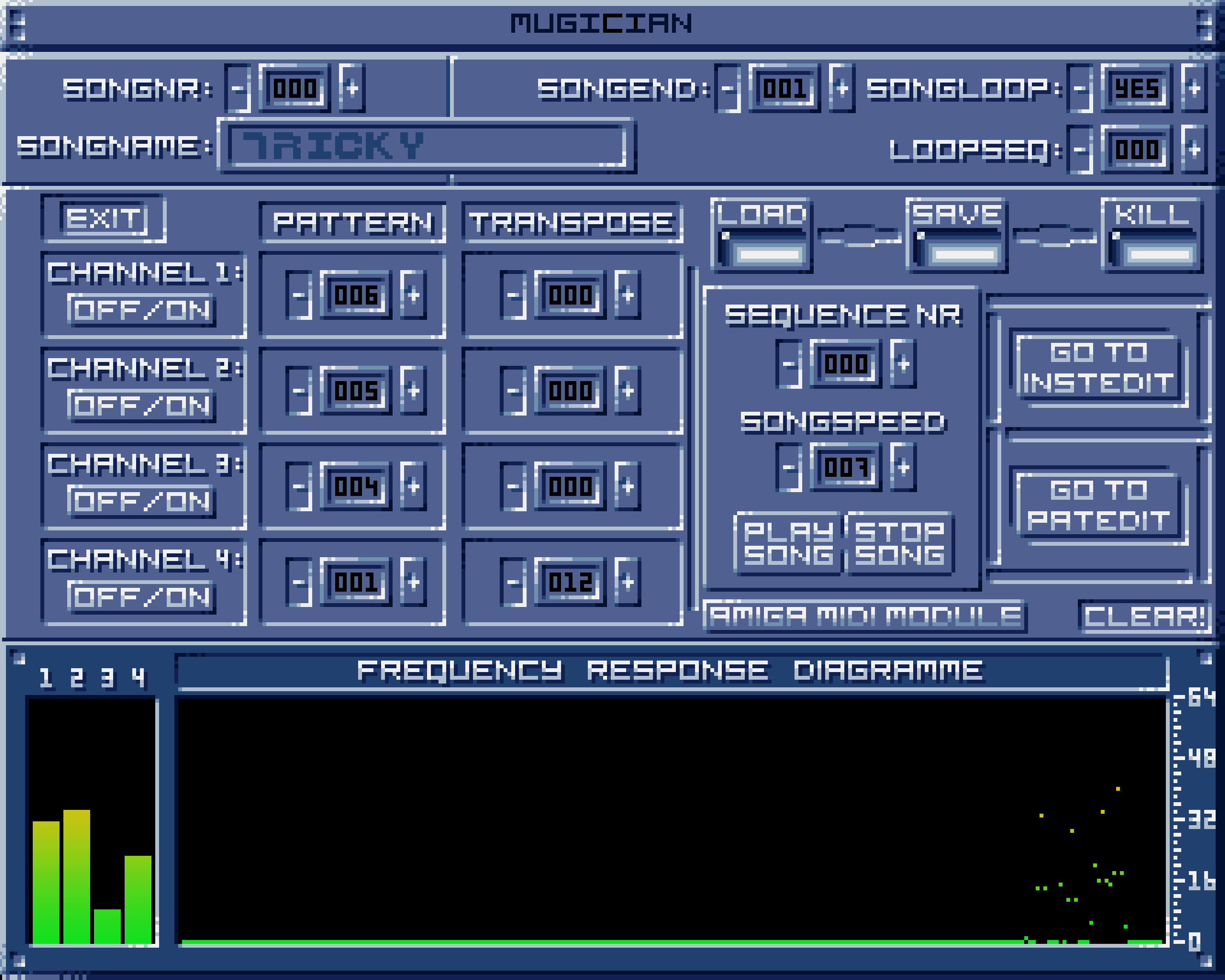
Main interface of Digital Mugician.

Soft Eyes also developed two Amiga music editors in the late 1980s, initially for use in their own games: SIDmon, named after the Commodore 64's Sound Interface Device audio chip, and Digital Mugician.

SIDmon was the first music editor for the Amiga to use synthethised sounds alongside sound samples, the former of which consumed much less RAM than the latter, making SIDmon very useful for composing music in games. Seven wrote the manual for the editor. SIDmon was published in 1989 by the German company Turtle Byte, who never paid any royalties for it. Seven and Van Vliet travelled to the Ami Expo in Cologne to approach Turtle Byte regarding the unpaid compensation, but this led to nothing. In 1991, Turtle Byte published an unauthorized second instalment of SIDmon with the help of programmer Michael Kleps (also known as "Unknown") from the demogroup Doctor Mabuse Orgasm Crackings. Digital Mugician, which was more technically and visually refined compared to SIDmon, was published in 1990 by Thalamus Ltd. Seven wrote the manual for Digital Mugician and made some refinements to its user interface, developed by Van Vliet. Version 2 of Digital Mugician featured a technique that allowed the four channels of the Amiga's Paula audio chip to be expanded with three extra channels using the 68000 CPU. This was achieved without the audible loss of quality associated with splitting the four Amiga audio channels. The only other Amiga music editor that utilized the 7-channel technique was Chris Hülsbeck's TFMX editor, used to compose the music of Turrican II: The Final Fight, among others.

Soft Eyes initially used SIDmon and later Digital Mugician to compose the music in their games. Following its release, Digital Mugician was also used by other game developers, such as Codemasters for The Quest of Agravain. Digital Mugician was reviewed by the Dutch Amiga Magazine for its June/July 1991 issue. Many years later in 1998, Van Vliet developed a third music editor named Syntrax (also known as Jaytrax), released for Windows, Pocket PC and Symbian in the early 2000s. Syntrax used the improved hardware to generate more synthesised sounds. Seven designed graphics for the intro.

=== Venom Wing ===
Soft Eyes finished developing their shoot 'em up game Venom Wing (also spelled Venomwing and initially called Hawkind), and managed to attract the interest of Thalamus, which released the game worldwide in 1990. Oliver Frey was commissioned to do the cover and advertising artwork. The Games Machine gave Venom Wing a score of 80%.

=== Borobodur: The Planet of Doom ===
In 1992, Soft Eyes developed Borobodur: The Planet of Doom, released by Thalamus. It was one of the last games in which Van Vliet and Opdam would collaborate together, the other being a racing game named Bump 'N' Burn, published by Grandslam Interactive in 1994. Opdam would leave to work at Team17, where he would work on the Worms series.

=== Hoi ===
In 1990, Soft Eyes began development on Hoi, which was released for the Amiga in the summer of 1992, by Hollyware Entertainment in the United States and Software Business in Europe. Hoi received positive reception from various international computer magazines, including The One, which gave the game a score of 90%. Around the time of the game's release, Soft Eyes, now renamed Team Hoi, was interviewed on national television in Club Veronica.

After a US$ 200 advance, Hollyware promised that the next transfer would follow soon, but stopped paying royalties to Team Hoi. The developers decided to release a special freeware remix version for the AGA Amiga system range in 1993.

=== Peanutbutter Power Game ===
In 1992, Amsterdam-based agency Top Drawers commissioned Team Hoi to develop a computer game for Ogilvy & Mather, which had been hired by Calvé and Unilever. The game, titled Peanutbutter Power Game, was the first Dutch computer game made specifically for marketing and promotional purposes. Because of the game's tight deadline, Team Hoi used the sprites of the titular character of their later game Moon Child as a template for the game's protagonist, Benny. A commercial was produced and filmed in a studio in Amsterdam, marking the debut of a young Lieke van Lexmond in the role of Anja, the girl playing the game. Van Vliet and Seven attended the shooting of the commercial, and played the game off-screen instead of Van Lexmond and the child actor playing Benny, whom Seven later stated was forgetting his lines out of nervousness. The Peanutbutter Power Game was played by children on the television programme Telekids, where players could win their height in stacked jars of Calvé peanut butter. Van Vliet and Seven attended the filming of the programme to boot up the game live for the children from the Amiga Assembler. The source code was later lost due to a backup accident.

In 2018, the game was included in the national Dutch Games Canon.

=== Hoi sAGA ===
In early 1993, Team Hoi released the first two parts of a demo trilogy named Hoi sAGA for the new generation of AGA Amigas, Planet Groove and Mindwarp. At the time, Commodore had not yet published documentation for the AGA chipset, and wanted to encourage developers to use the Amiga's operating system instead of programming the hardware directly. Van Vliet discovered new chip registers through experimentation and utilised them in the demos, such as an expanded "dual-playfield" mode with more bitplanes. The third part, The Final Chapter, was planned to be released at The Party, but was not completed in time and was later released in January 1994 instead.

=== Cognition and Clockwiser ===
In 1994, Team Hoi developed two puzzle games, Cognition and Clockwiser. Cognition was published by Divo, the Dutch publisher of Amiga Magazine, STart, and later MacFan, while Clockwiser was published by Rasputin Software for the Amiga, MS-DOS and Microsoft Windows, the latter receiving positive reception from international computer magazines. CU Amiga gave Clockwiser a score of 82%. The MS-DOS and Windows versions were programmed by Peter Schaap. Rasputin failed to pay Team Hoi any royalties, despite the developers' formal demands.

=== Moon Child ===
In late 1991, Seven created the first concept designs for a small elf, who would become the protagonist for Team Hoi's next game, Moon Child. In 1992–1993, Team Hoi began developing Moon Child as an unofficial sequel to Hoi. (Note: Attributed to multiple references:) The game is a 2D side-scrolling action-platformer set in a science fiction–fantasy world, in which Moon Child is tasked with saving the planet Utopia from a destructive techno-virus. The player controls Moon Child to guide him through four environmental worlds, each containing multiple themed levels. Moon Child avoids hazards and enemies while collecting "Dark Diamonds", 77 out of 84 of which are required to progress to the final level of the game.

The visual look of Moon Child was inspired by Three Wonders' Midnight Wanderers and Ghosts 'n Goblins. Seven initially planned an animation of Moon Child jumping into the foreground for the game's title screen, but this concept went unused. He also had a darker story for the game in mind, in which Moon Child was to live in a Gothic castle, and designed artwork for the story in Imagine and Deluxe Paint. The story would have also included a "Moon Princess" character. Moon Child originally had a tunic, shoes, an elvish hat and a tuft of hair, but was redesigned to wear a onesie in order to keep the character "minimalistic" and fit the game's smooth scrolling mechanics. His running and jumping sprites were animated using guides from Preston Blair's Cartoon Animation book as reference. To make the character blink without multiplying the number of sprites, Van Vliet reserved a specific shade of magenta for Moon Child's eye sockets and projected an independent blink animation onto that color during gameplay. Moon Child's sprites were used as a template for Benny in Peanutbutter Power Game, due to that game's tight deadline. The game's initial intro theme music was composed by Van Vliet. The titular character from Hoi was planned to appear as Moon Child's sidekick, but was later scrapped. The jetpack concept from Team Hoi's cancelled game Ragnov was repurposed for Moon Child. A shooter level with a bird and bats was planned for inclusion in the game, but went unused.

Braumuller composed the title theme music. He took inspiration from demoscene music trackers and producing house music with his brother Ruud Braumuller (b. 1967) as "The R". He also performed the vocals and recorded them onto a VHS tape with an ADAT multitrack-recorder, then loaded the sample into Digital Mugician on the Amiga. Other samples used in the theme included dialogue from The Adventures of Superman and Dragnet, and a vocal from "Me and Baby Brother" by War, all lifted from the sample CDs Beats, Breaks & Scratches Volume 5 and Beats, Breaks & Scratches Volume 6 by Simon Harrris. While attending The Party in Denmark, Seven displayed a drawing at the team's table, showing Moon Child stopping Sonic the Hedgehog from running. Seven stated that the drawing was done out of frustration toward the first Sonic game for its emphasis on speed and gameplay similarities to Hoi, and the fact that it was released while Team Hoi was facing unpaid royalties from Innerprise Software. Moon Child himself would be included in Team Hoi's demo Hoi sAGA Demo III: The Final Chapter in 1994.

The game was initially pitched to Psygnosis and planned for release on the AGA models of the Amiga platform, but was cancelled due to a lack of budget and the discontinuation of the Amiga. In the autumn of 1995, Team Hoi switched to Windows during development, and made an agreement with Valkieser Publishing to start a game development division called "The Games Department". (Note: Attributed to multiple references:) The Amiga demo's graphics and engine were repurposed for an interactive "micro-game" for the Dutch educational TV series Typisch Techniek. The developers used a high resolution of 640x480 pixels for Moon Child to allow for more detailed graphics, in contrast to other games in the 1990s which used a low resolution of 320x240 pixels. The game was programmed in C++ using Microsoft DirectX 5.0, running at a smooth 60 frames per second. Its components, including the levels, animations, and audio, were data-driven, generated by external configuration files (text and binary). The developers created an "actor"-based system for sprite management, in which every character had their own AI programming separate from the animation. The developers showed off the system by creating a walking construction helmet in Environment 2, nicknamed "Helmut". Due to Helmut sharing the same movement code with Moon Child himself, this allowed for the former to follow the latter by jumping from platforms. Moon Child's original design would make a cameo appearance in Environment 1. The game's 3D cutscenes were written, storyboarded and directed by Seven and animated in Alias Wavefront on Silicon Graphics systems by Viktor Rietveld and Riccardo Russo. Braumuller was hired as a freelancer to compose a techno arrangement of the theme and original music and sound effects in the CD-ROM audio format for the Windows version, using a Roland Jupiter-8, an Elka Synthex, a Korg MS-20, a Dynacord ADS sampler, a Roland TB-303, and a Korg Wavestation and recording it on VHS with the ADAT recorder. Braumuller composed a track for the intro for the game's darker storyline, which went unused. Seven provided the vocals saying, "Game over!" in the track and Moon Child's grunt during gameplay when he hits an obstacle. One of the game's sound effects (a witch laughing) was taken from a stock sound effect CD.

Valkieser hired Seattle-based company ST-Labs to playtest the game, and produced a commercial using gameplay footage, the 3D cutscenes and cover art, and raw in-game audio. Van Vliet and Seven gave a lecture and a two-week workshop on game development at the Faculty of Art, Media and Technology of the HKU University of the Arts Utrecht in Hilversum. Valkieser was also looking for international distributors for the game, with Sony and Fujitsu showing interest, but later closed their publishing division, as well as "The Games Department", due to financial issues from a failed investment in the CD-i. In September 1997, Moon Child was nominated for an EMMA Award at MIPTV's MILIA festival in Cannes. CD-ROM Special praised the game's animations and gimmicks, describing it as "all really fun and, above all, remarkably easy to play". The game was published by Valkieser in the Netherlands on October 4, 1997. It received positive reviews, but did not receive widespread critical attention. TV-Krant gave the game a rating of 9/10. Around this time, Van Vliet and Seven gave a workshop to children during the annual Cinekid Festival at De Balie in Amsterdam. Team Hoi were interviewed by the Dutch magazine Power Unlimited in 1998. Despite its lack of an international release, pirated copies of Moon Child were later found to have been distributed worldwide. Valkieser continued to exist for a few more years until it was absorbed into the facilities company United in 2002.

On July 1, 2004, Klaar Mobile Entertainment released Moon Child on Windows Mobile/Pocket PC. The music was composed by Stefan Alfrink using Van Vliet's music editor Syntrax. The game received positive reviews. In 2012, the game was released for iOS. In 2018, it was released on the macOS App Store. In April 2026, Seven sent the Amiga demo to the website Games That Weren't, who wrote an article about the game. The website also included a video with the theme song, which became viral on Bluesky, and led to Internet memes, videos and fan art of Moon Child and Hoi. Retrospective commentary has generally described the title as a "charming" but obscure example of late-1990s platform design, praising its visual style and traditional gameplay while noting its niche status. (Note: Attributed to multiple references:) The game received a modern port via the source code, titled Moon Child FE ("Friend Edition") and released by programmer Mors. The source code for Hoi, Clockwiser and Digital Mugician was also released. The port would be made playable on Mac by Mac Source Port. In May–August 2026, an MS-DOS port named Moon Child DE ("DOS Edition") was released by programmer FrenkelS.

=== Brand Slakkenrace and Yin Hung ===
Van Vliet and Seven left Valkieser to work at the Weesp-based company Spin Multimedia, where they continued their collaboration in the company's multimedia development department named Jaytown, developing games for commercial promotional campaigns among other things. Among the titles developed for Jaytown was Brand Slakkenrace ("Brand Snail Race"), a game for Brand Brewery released for WIndows in 1998 as a continuation of one of their commercials, in which a snail plays the leading role. Seven returned to his freelance career after that. In 2003–2004, he collaborated one last time with Van Vliet, who by then was developing mobile games for the Amsterdam-based company Overloaded. Together, they developed Yin Hung for Overloaded on Symbian, which was used by devices like the N-Gage and Sony Ericsson.

=== After Team Hoi ===
Seven, Braumuller and Van Vliet remained friends, but split up and each went their separate ways in the 2000s. Van Vliet continued to work for Overloaded for some time, later shifting from developing mobile games to producing mobile applications for various companies. Braumuller continues making music, collaborating with his partner Tom Sijmons at Visual Noise on projects including commercials, documentaries, and videos by Minecraft YouTubers, and playing in the party band Sonny's with Sonny Hoogwerf. Seven worked as a 3D freelancer on projects such as VPRO's interactive animation series Tattletoons. He illustrated for various magazines, including PC-Active (1999–2004), Computable, Intermediair (2002–2005), Computer!Totaal (2004–2007), Elsevier Weekblad (2006–2014), Emerce, and Esquire. From the mid-2000s, he worked as a cartoonist for NRC Next (2006–2010) and NU.nl (2006–2013) under his company name and pseudonym "Seven's Heaven", creating the comic strip Seamour Sheep using Autodesk 3ds Max. In the 2010s, he designed and visualised toy figures for various international promotional campaigns. In the early 2020s, he was a Technical Artist for the Blender Foundation.

== Games ==
Games and applications developed by Team Hoi:

Name	Year	Publisher
Ragnov (demo)	1988	Soft Eyes
SIDmon	1989	Turtle Byte
Venom Wing	1990	Thalamus Ltd
Digital Mugician	1990	Thalamus Ltd
Borobodur: The Planet of Doom	1992	Thalamus Ltd
Hoi	1992	Hollyware Entertainment
Peanutbutter Power Game	1992	Calvé/Unilever
Hoi AGA Remix	1993	Team Hoi
Cognition	1994	Divo
Clockwiser	1994	Rasputin Software
Moon Child	1997	Valkieser
Brand Slakkenrace	1998	Brand Brewery
Yin Hung	2003	Overloaded

Demoscene demos developed by Team Hoi:

Name	Year	Publisher
Planet Groove	1993	Team Hoi
Mindwarp	1993	Team Hoi
Hoi sAGA III: The Final Chapter	1994	Team Hoi
