= Moonchild (Charlene Soraia album) =

Studio album by Charlene Soraia
- Released: 21 November 2011
- Recorded: 2009–2011
- Genre: Pop, acoustic, folk
- Label: Peacefrog
- Producer: Paul Stacey

Charlene Soraia chronology
Moonchild (2011)	Love Is the Law (2015)

Singles from Moonchild
- 1. "Wherever You Will Go" Released: 30 September 2011; 2. "Bipolar" Released: 18 November 2011

Moonchild is the debut studio album by British solo artist Charlene Soraia. It was released on 21 November 2011 by Peacefrog Records. A cover of "Wherever You Will Go", by American rock band The Calling, acted as the album's lead single, which is something of a 10 years old hit song already.

== Singles ==
- "Wherever You Will Go" was released as the album's lead single on 30 September 2011. The song is a cover and was originally released by American rock band, The Calling. The version was used in a Twinings advert in the UK. It peaked at number 2 on the UK Songs Chart iTunes, number 3 on the UK Singles Chart and number 20 on the Irish Singles Chart.

== Track listing ==
No.	Title	Length
1.	"When We Were Five"	6:28
2.	"Daffodils"	4:08
3.	"Lightyears"	3:03
4.	"Rowing"	4:19
5.	"Meadow Child"	3:08
6.	"Twas Lovely"	3:13
7.	"Bipolar"	3:42
8.	"Postcards From iO"	3:50
9.	"Bike"	2:58
10.	"Midsummer Moon In June"	1:55
11.	"Wishing You Well"	2:44
12.	"Almost Stole A Book"	3:43
13.	"Wherever You Will Go The Calling cover 2001"	3:17

== Chart performance ==
Chart (2011)	Peak position
UK Albums Chart	83

== Release history ==
Country	Date	Format	Label
United Kingdom	21 November 2011	Digital download, CD	Peacefrog Records
