= Luca Landucci =

Italian apothecary and writer

Luca Landucci (1436–1516) was an Italian apothecary from Florence, best known as the writer of a diary which later became an important primary source about the history of Florence.

The older of two sons of a prosperous citizen of Florence, Landucci was trained as a bookkeeper, and became the apprentice to an apothecary at the age of sixteen. Six years later, he formed a partnership with a friend and opened a shop, but was forced to dissolve the partnership when the friend proved too spendthrift and exhausted all of their capital. Landucci married a woman named Salvestra at the age of thirty, and used his wife's dowry to open a new shop. The business prospered, and after fourteen more years he was able to move his shop to a better spot across from the soon-to-be-constructed Strozzi Palace. The Landuccis had twelve children together, and Luca remained at this location until his death in 1516.

In 1450, Landucci began keeping the diary that would posthumously prove his claim to fame, diligently recording events of the day until his death. Among the events documented in this manner by Landucci was the birth of the Monster of Ravenna. The diary was continued after his death by an unknown writer until 1542. The first English language translation, performed by Alice de Rosen Jervis, was published in 1927 as A Florentine diary from 1450 to 1516. Landucci's original manuscript is preserved in the Biblioteca Comunale in Siena.

A street in modern Florence, Via Luca Landucci, is named in his honor. It connects the Via Capo di Mondo and the Cavalcavia dell'Affrico.
