= Lectionary 276 =

Lectionary ℓ 276
- New Testament manuscript
- Text: Evangelistarium
- Date: 13th century
- Script: Greek
- Now at: Biblioteca Marciana
- Size: 27.7 cm by 21.3 cm
- Type: Byzantine text-type
- Note: illuminated

Lectionary 276, designated by siglum ℓ 276 (in the Gregory-Aland numbering) is a Greek manuscript of the New Testament, on parchment. Palaeographically it has been assigned to the 13th century. Scrivener labelled it as 182^{e},

The manuscript has complex contents.

== Description ==
The codex contains lessons from the Gospel of John, Matthew, and Luke (Evangelistarium).

The text is written in Greek minuscule letters, on 168 parchment leaves (27.7 cm by 21.3 cm), in two columns per page, 24 lines per page. The manuscript contains weekday Gospel lessons.

According to Scrivener it was "once a fine codex, now tied up in a parcel by itself". It is destroyed by moisture.

== History ==
Dean Burgon dated the manuscript to the 11th century, Scrivener to the 12th century, and Gregory to the 13th century. It has been assigned by the Institute for New Testament Textual Research to the 13th century.

The manuscript belonged to Hieronymus Venus in 1722. It has been held in the church of Saint Mark.

The manuscript was added to the list of New Testament manuscripts by Scrivener (number 182^{e}) and Gregory (number 276^{e}). Gregory saw the manuscript in 1886.

The manuscript is sporadically cited in the critical editions of the Greek New Testament (UBS3).

The codex is housed at the Biblioteca Marciana (Gr. I,54 (1146)) in Venice.

== See also ==
- List of New Testament lectionaries
- Biblical manuscript
- Textual criticism
- Lectionary 275

== Bibliography ==
- Gregory, Caspar René (1900). Textkritik des Neuen Testaments. Vol. 1. Leipzig: Hinrichs. p. 410.
