= Monstrous birth =

Birth of a monstrously defective child

A monstrous birth is a birth in which a defect renders the animal or human child so malformed that it is considered "monstrous". Historically, such births were often interpreted as omens, signs of God, or moral warnings, and used by society as a tool for manipulation. The development of obstetrics helped to dispel spurious associations with evil, but the historical significance of these fetuses remains noteworthy. In early and medieval Christianity, monstrous births were presented as posing difficult theological problems about humanity and salvation.

== Overview ==
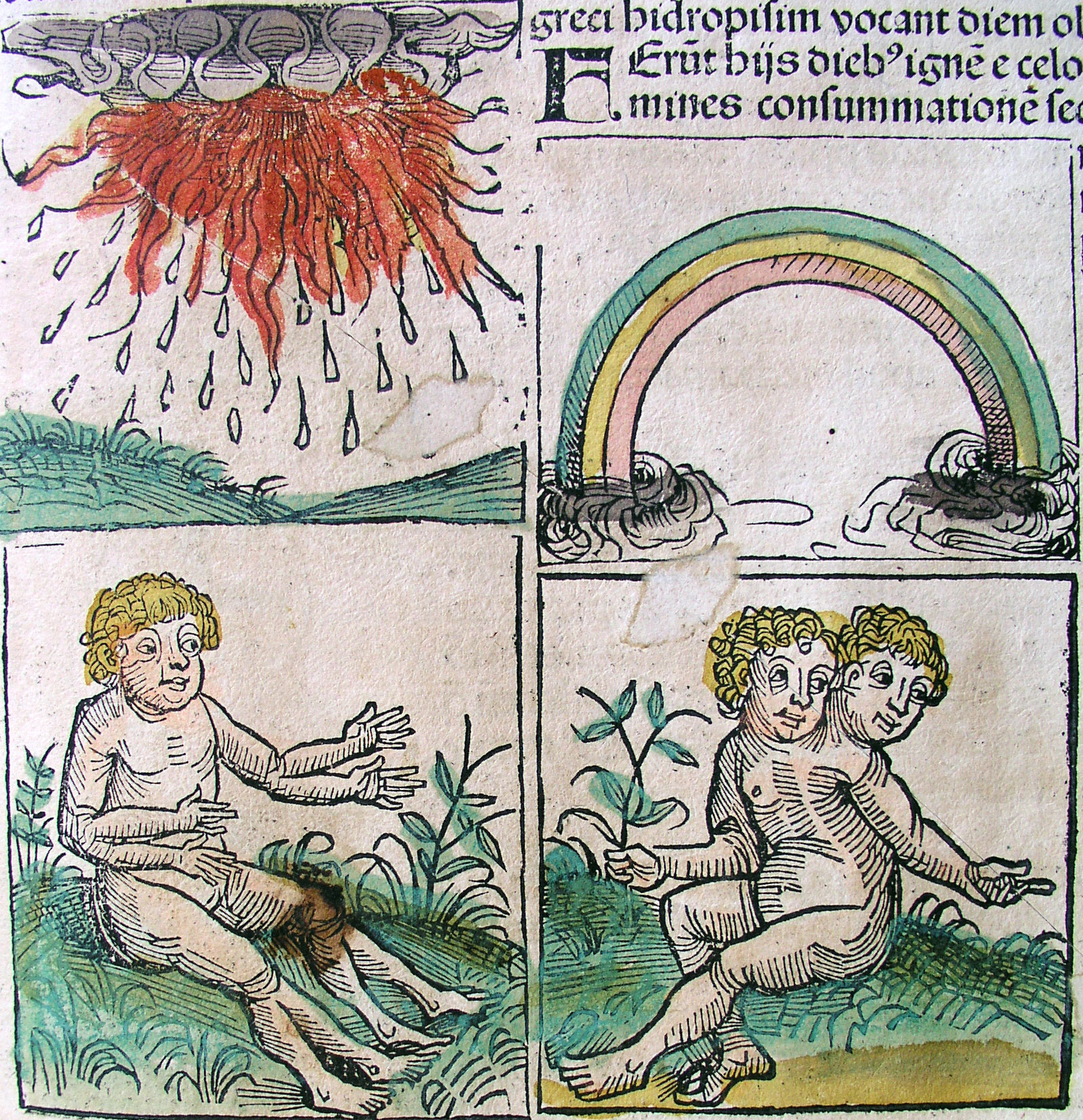
Monstrous births and omens in the Nuremberg Chronicle.

An early reference to monstrous birth is in the apocryphal biblical text 2 Esdras, where it is linked to menstruation: "women in their uncleanness will bear monsters." Often placed in a religious context, monstrous births are frequently interpreted as signs and symbols, as evidenced in the 1493 Nuremberg Chronicle. According to David Hume's The Natural History of Religion, they are among the first signs that arouse the barbarian's interest. Monstrous human births raise questions about the difference between humans and animals, and anthropologists have described varying interpretations of and behaviors toward such births. Among the East African Nuer people, monstrous births are dealt with in a way that restores the division between humans and animals: "the Nuer treat monstrous births as baby hippopotamuses, accidentally born to humans, and, with this labelling, the appropriate action is clear. They gently lay them in the river where they belong."

The nature of monstrous births—whether natural, unnatural, or supernatural—remained a topic of discussion. Saint Augustine argued that nothing "done by the will of God could be contrary to nature," while Thomas Aquinas considered some miracles to be against nature.

=== Medieval explanations ===
Reasons for monstrous births given in early medieval penitentials (concerned with sexual sin) and thirteenth-century medical texts (concerned with physical purity) include pollution through menses and intercourse during menstruation. Such explanations appear in many medieval literary texts, including Jean Maillart's fourteenth-century Roman du Comte Anjou and Geoffrey Chaucer's Man of Law's Tale.

=== Early modern explanations ===
Sixteenth- and seventeenth-century medical texts, which treat pregnancy as a disease, suggest that monstrous births may result from the mother's sickness or distress. They also perpetuate the myth of intercourse (bestial or otherwise) during pregnancy as a cause. The mother's role is paramount, with the presupposition being the possibility of emotional transference from mother to fetus, referred to as the "theory of the maternal imagination":

According to most of the authors of the sixteenth through early eighteenth centuries, an expectant mother's cravings, desires, and experiences—especially experiences that aroused strong passions such as fear and lust—were capable of directly inscribing themselves upon the body of the fetus, producing deformities and monstrosities that retained the semantic content of the original impression.

Simultaneously, an epistemological shift occurred, changing monstrous births from "signs to facts". These births were now often publicized in pamphlets and broadsides and became subjects of scientific investigation, with the early sixteenth century seeing an "apparent upsurge of interest in monstrous births".

== Animal births ==
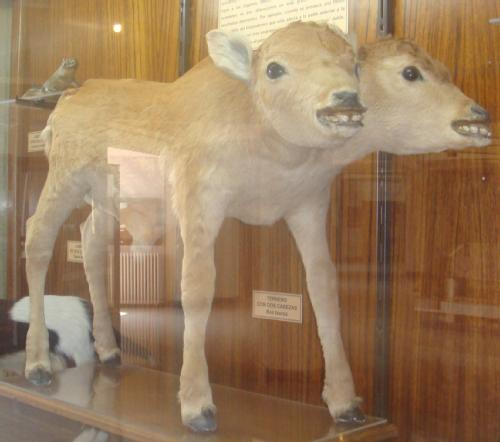
A two-headed cow.

Monstrous animal births often appear during times of religious upheaval. Many occurred in Reformation-era Europe: the advent of Luther was supposedly announced by the 1522 birth of a monstrous calf (a mooncalf) in Saxony, and the accession of Elizabeth I of England was supposedly indicated by monstrous births as well, as a warning to "Catholics and other sinners".

=== Luther's mooncalf ===
Born in Freiberg, Saxony, on 8 December 1522, a misshapen calf quickly became significant in the German Reformation. Its hind legs were straight like a human's, and a fold of skin over its head resembled a cowl, leading to its comparison with a monk. An illustration reached a Prague astrologer, who "discovered that the monster did indeed signify something terrible, indeed the most awful thing possible—Martin Luther". Luther responded with a pamphlet containing a mock exegesis of the creature, Monk Calf, in which the calf represents the Catholic church in all its monstrosity. Luther's anti-papist pamphlet was published with a tract by Philipp Melanchthon about a fictional monster, the Pope-Ass, a hybrid between a man and a donkey supposedly found near Rome after the 1496 flood. Circulated in 1523, Martin Luther and Philipp Melanchthon's pamphlet was titled The Meaning of Two Horrific Figures, the Papal Ass at Rome and the Monk Calf Found at Freyberg in Meissen. Lucas Cranach the Elder and his workshop provided the illustrations of the Papal Ass and the Monk Calf for the pamphlet. Variations of Luther and Melanchthon's pamphlet were eventually circulated, including one depicting the Papal Ass and the Monk Calf in "an encounter between the two creatures", adding "with signs of the Day of Judgement" to the title.

== Human births ==
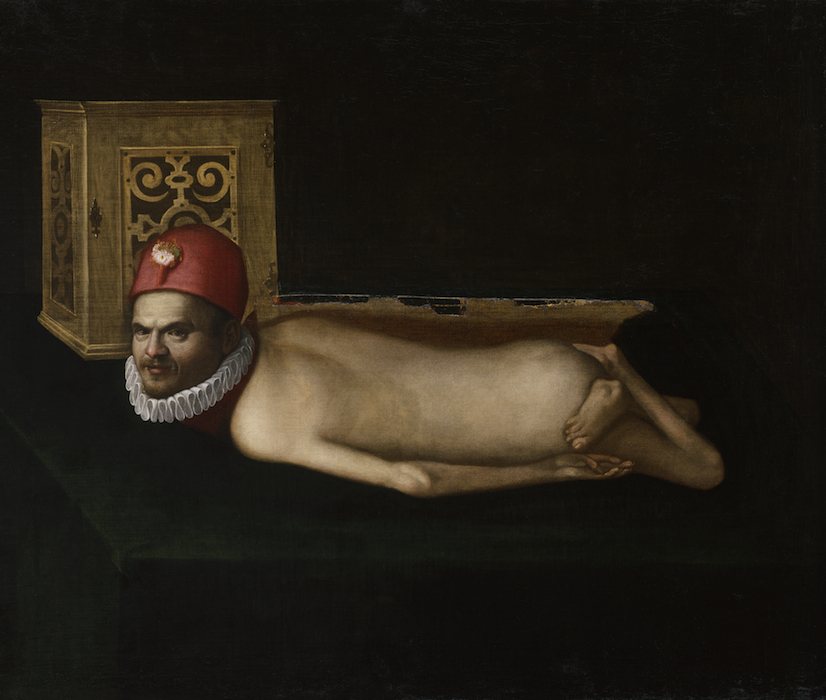
Sixteenth-century oil painting, Painting of a handicapped man.

From the early Middle Ages onward, especially monstrous human births were seen as signifying God's interaction with the world: "a monstrous birth is the shape of wickedness, not only the result of original sin but of more local and immediate forms as well." One of the best-known examples of such births was the Monster of Ravenna.

Although connections between monstrous births and improper maternal behavior were eventually dismissed by reliable authorities, a late incident involving such allegations occurred in the Massachusetts Bay Colony. Mary Dyer, later a Quaker martyr, gave birth to a deformed child in October 1637. Anne Hutchinson, a noted religious dissenter acquainted with the Dyer family and present at that birth, herself delivered a "monster" the following year. John Winthrop, who was bringing legal proceedings against both women for heresy, publicized both cases.

== See also ==
- Teratoma
- Parasitic twin
- Conjoined twins
