= Lectionary 270 =

Lectionary ℓ 270
- New Testament manuscript
- Text: Evangelistarium
- Date: 14th century
- Script: Greek
- Now at: Biblioteca Marciana
- Size: 29 cm by 20.8 cm
- Type: Byzantine text-type

Lectionary 270, designated by siglum ℓ 270 (in the Gregory-Aland numbering) is a Greek manuscript of the New Testament, on paper. Palaeographically it has been assigned to the 14th century. Scrivener labelled it as 176^{e}, Gregory by 270^{e}. Formerly it was known as Nanianus 184. The manuscript has complex contents.

== Description ==
The codex contains lessons from the Gospel of John, Matthew, and Luke (Evangelistarium). It contains text of the Pericope Adulterae.

The text is written in Greek minuscule letters, on 403 paper leaves (29 cm by 20.8 cm), in two columns per page, 20 lines per page.

The manuscript contains weekday Gospel lessons from Easter to Pentecost and Saturday/Sunday Gospel lessons for the other weeks.

== History ==
Scrivener and Gregory dated the manuscript to the 14th or 15th century. It is presently assigned by the INTF to the 14th century.

The manuscript was added to the list of New Testament manuscripts by Scrivener (number 176^{e}) and Gregory (number 270^{e}). Gregory saw the manuscript in 1886.

The manuscript is not cited in the critical editions of the Greek New Testament (UBS3).

Currently the codex is housed at the Biblioteca Marciana (Gr. I.50 (1436)) in Venice.

== See also ==
- List of New Testament lectionaries
- Biblical manuscript
- Textual criticism
- Lectionary 269

== Bibliography ==
- Gregory, Caspar René (1900). Textkritik des Neuen Testaments. Vol. 1. Leipzig: Hinrichs. p. 410.
