= Mama's Boys =

Northern Irish hard rock/heavy metal band

- Origin: County Fermanagh, Northern Ireland
- Genres: Traditional Irish music (early) hard rock/heavy metal/melodic rock (later)
- Years active: 1978–1993
- Label: Jive
- Past members: Pat McManus; John McManus; Tommy McManus; Rick Chase; Keith Murrell; Mike Wilson; Alan Williams; Jimmy DeGrasso
- Website: Pat McManus' Homepage

Mama's Boys were a 1980s hard rock/heavy metal group from County Fermanagh in Northern Ireland. The band included the three McManus brothers Pat, a.k.a. "The Professor", (guitar, fiddle), John (bass, vocals), and Tommy (drums). Later in their career they became a four-piece, adding Rick Chase on vocals in 1986, who was replaced by Keith Murrell in 1987 due to Chase's ill health. Murrell was replaced by Connor McKeon in 1989, who was himself replaced by Mike Wilson in 1990.

== History ==
=== Formation ===
The McManus brothers grew up on a farm near the village of Derrylin, County Fermanagh, and started their musical career as award-winning traditional Irish musicians; but were inspired by the Irish celtic rock band, Horslips, as well as younger brother Tommy's passion for the drums to form a rock band. In the late 1970s, the brothers had become fans of Horslips and attended their gigs at every possible opportunity. They eventually got to know and became friends with the band members. It was around that time that they started their own band, which was originally called Pulse, before they changed it to Mama's Boys. Barry Devlin of Horslips heard about their band and went to see them rehearse at their home. He was suitably impressed and offered them a support slot for Horslips' 1979 tour.

=== Career ===
Although their heroes Horslips mixed traditional music with hard rock, and the McManus brothers were top notch traditional musicians, Mama's Boys did not really go for the Celtic fusion sound, apart from the occasional fiddle solo by Pat, but went for a harder edged heavy metal sound.

They recorded their first self-funded album Official Album (re-released in 1981 as Official Bootleg) in 1980 in only four hours. In 1981 they were invited to support Hawkwind on their UK tour. They recorded and self-financed their second album, entitled Plug It In in 1982, and achieved a hit single in Ireland with the most pop-oriented song on the album, "Needle in the Groove".

The third album Turn It Up was released in 1983. The same year they toured with Thin Lizzy on that band's farewell tour, played at the Reading Rock Festival and signed a worldwide record deal with Jive Records. The first album released on Jive contained some songs previously released on early albums, but completely re-recorded with a few new songs. One of the new songs, a cover of Slade's "Mama Weer All Crazee Now" was released as a single and reached number 54 in the American chart. The video for the song got airplay on MTV and helped the band to become known in the US, which they then toured in 1984. Coincidentally, the American heavy metal band Quiet Riot also released their cover version of the song at the same time as Mama's Boys, but Quiet Riot's version gained more airplay.

1985's Power and Passion album broke into the Billboard 200 chart in the US and the band toured in the US, Europe and Japan. During the European leg of the tour Tommy had a relapse of leukemia, which he had been treated for as a child, and a replacement drummer Jimmy DeGrasso was brought in to complete the tour. The recovering Tommy re-joined the tour in Ireland but had to be rushed back to hospital after another relapse.

In 1987, former Airrace vocalist Keith Murrell was brought in after Rick Chase started having trouble with his vocal cords and they recorded the album Growing Up The Hard Way. Murrell left in 1988 to join Cliff Richard as a backing singer. Connor McKeon replaced Murrell in 1989, but this was short lived and he was replaced by Mike Wilson.

In 1990, with the new vocalist, and under new management, they moved their base to the UK. The live album Live Tonite was released in 1991, and the band toured extensively in Europe. They released the album Relativity in 1992.

=== Dissolution and aftermath ===
While on tour in Italy in 1993, Tommy became ill again and the tour had to be cancelled. The following year Tommy underwent a bone marrow transplant but he did not survive. His brothers were devastated and Mama's Boys did not continue. On the first anniversary of Tommy's death, John composed a traditional lament on the low whistle for his brother and this led to himself and Pat revisiting their traditional Irish music roots and forming a Celtic/new age group called Celtus.

In 2003, Pat McManus joined with Irish rock band 'Indian' for two albums and live shows. After this he joined the Painkillers for a short while, and then formed "Pat McManus and High Voltage" which, in 2007, became the Pat McManus Band with Marty McDermott on bass and Paul Faloon on drums.

The Pat McManus Band released Tattooed in Blue in 2018, and an acoustic guitar based album called Rewind in 2019, alongside a European tour.

== Band members ==
=== Former members ===
- Patrick Francis "Pat" McManus – lead guitar, fiddle, backing vocals (1978–1993) (born 1960, Derrylin)
- John McManus – bass, lead vocals, backing vocals, low whistle, tin whistle, uilleann pipes (Irish bagpipes) (1978–1993) (born 24 March 1961, Enniskillen)
- Thomas "Tommy" McManus – drums, bodhran (Irish drum), backing vocals (1978–1993) (25 March 1966 – 16 November 1994, aged 28)
- Rick Chase – lead vocals (1986)
- Keith Murrell – lead vocals (1987–1989)
- Connor McKeon – lead vocals (1989)
- Mike Wilson – lead vocals (1990–1993)
- Alan Williams – keyboards (1989–1993)
- Dillon Tonkin – keyboards (1991)
- Jimmy DeGrasso – drums (1985)

== Discography ==
=== Albums ===
- Official Bootleg (1980)
- Plug It In (1982)
- Turn It Up (1983)
- Mama's Boys (compilation album) (1984)
- Power and Passion (1985)
- Growing Up the Hard Way (1987)
- Live Tonite (1991)
- Relativity (1992)

=== Singles ===
- "Rollin' On" (1980)
- "High Energy Weekend" (1980)
- "Silence is out of Fashion" (1981)
- "Belfast City Blues" / "Reach for the Top" (1982)
- "In the Heat of the Night" (1982)
- "Needle in the Groove" (1982)
- "Telephone Teaser" (1983)
- "Loose Living" (1983)
- "Too Little of You to Love" (1983)
- "Midnight Promises" (1984)
- "Face to Face" (1984)
- "Mama We're All Crazee Now" (1984)
- "Runaway Dreams" (1985)
- "If the Kids are United" (1984)
- "Needle in the Groove" (1985)
- "Hard 'N' Loud" (1985)
- "Lettin' Go" (1985)
- "Waiting for a Miracle" (1987)
- "Higher Ground" (1987)
- "Spirit of America" (1987)
- "This Flight Tonight" (1991)
- "Laugh About It" (1992)

=== DVDs ===
- "Mama We're All Crazee Now" (2006)

== See also ==
- List of new wave of British heavy metal bands
