= Apocalypse of Paul =

4th-century Christian text

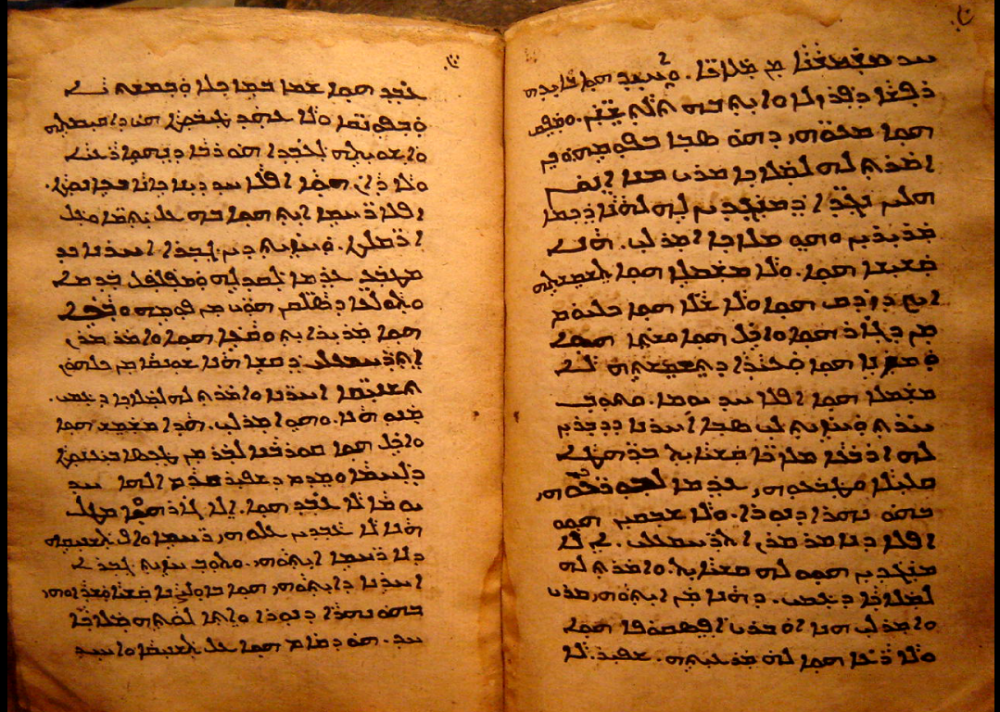
A 7th century Iranian codex containing a Syriac version, from St. Joseph's Cathedral, Tehran

The Apocalypse of Paul (Apocalypsis Pauli, literally "Revelation of Paul"; more commonly known in the Latin tradition as the Visio Pauli or Visio Sancti Pauli) is a fourth-century non-canonical apocalypse and part of the New Testament apocrypha. The full original Greek version of the Apocalypse of Paul is lost, although fragmentary versions still exist. Using later versions and translations, the text has been reconstructed, notably from Latin and Syriac translations of the work.

The text, which is pseudepigraphal, purports to present a detailed account of a vision of Heaven and Hell experienced by Paul the Apostle. While the work was not accepted among Church leaders, it was quite commonly read in the Middle Ages and helped to shape the beliefs of many Christians concerning the nature of the afterlife. Numerous surviving manuscripts in many languages attest to its popularity. In particular, Dante likely was familiar with the work, and it influenced The Divine Comedy.

According to the Apocalypse, Christians will be judged immediately after their death and sent to either heaven or hell based on a report of their deeds from a guardian angel. Monastics such as monks and ascetics receive special attention, with the possibility of both much better and much worse fates than the average Christian based on whether they kept the correct theology, kept to their appointed fasts, practiced what they preached, and so on. At the end of the text, Paul or the Virgin Mary (depending on the manuscript) manages to persuade God to give everyone in Hell a day off every Sunday.

== Authorship and date ==
The Roman Empire around 400 AD. The author was a Greek-speaking Christian, suggesting an origin in the eastern half of the Empire; scholars suggest Roman Egypt as likely. The reign of Emperor Theodosius I saw Christianity's stature greatly burnished, with it becoming the state religion of the Empire in 380.

The author of the work is unknown. The work opens with a discovery narrative that explains that while the Apostle Paul wrote it, the book was then buried beneath the foundations of a house in Tarsus (Paul's hometown) for centuries until an angel ordered the compiler to dig it up. The work claims this discovery happened during the reign of Emperor Theodosius I (reigned 379–395), giving a good estimate of roughly when the narrative appeared. (The Christian author Sozomen wrote that he investigated this claim, and an elderly priest of Tarsus had no recollection of such a bizarre event occurring; rather, it was transparently an attempt to explain how a "new" work of Paul could be published.) The author may have been familiar with 2 Corinthians Chapter 12, where Paul discusses how he knew of a person who visited the third heaven; the work implies that person was Paul himself.

The author of the Apocalypse of Paul was probably Egyptian. (Note: Constantin von Tischendorf argued that it might originate from Jerusalem or Palestine; Carl Hermann Kraeling suggested Syria as a possibility. Theodore Silverstein dismisses both of these possibilities as unlikely. Jan Bremmer conurs that Egypt is the most likely origin, citing an assumed milieu of monks and monasteries that largely did not exist until the 4th century, as well as a Coptic translation of the Apocalypse that refers to the Powers of Darkness as having "crocodile faces" (crocodiles were found in Egypt but not elsewhere) among other elements.) Some scholars such as Emiliano Fiori have argued that it was more specifically composed at a Pachomian monastery in Egypt, although other scholars think the evidence is insufficient. Constantin von Tischendorf, M. R. James, Bart Ehrman, Jan N. Bremmer, and others all date it to the late 4th century, perhaps c. 388–400 CE. The text had to exist by 415, as Augustine of Hippo makes a disparaging comment about it in his Tractates on the Gospel of John. A few scholars date the book earlier, to the middle of the 3rd century, and suggest that only the introduction was written in the late 4th century in a "second edition" of the work.

== Earlier influences ==
The author seems to be familiar with the "Book of the Watchers" in the Book of Enoch, the Apocalypse of Zephaniah, and the Apocalypse of Peter as influences on the work. Nevertheless, the accounts of Heaven and Hell in the Apocalypse of Paul differ from its predecessors in some major ways. The Apocalypse of Peter was written during a period when Christians were a minority struggling to gain adherents, and tensions with pagans and Jews were a major issue. The Apocalypse of Paul was written much later when Christianity had become the accepted and majority religion of the Roman Empire. As such, much of its focus is not on external issues, but rather issues internal to Christianity. More devout and ascetic Christians will be rewarded additionally in heaven beyond what is given to more passive Christians; Christians who err in some manner, whether by heresy, or a failure to uphold ascetic vows, will be condemned to hell. The text gives little to no discussion to non-Christians, seemingly considering them irrelevant; its Hell is one of punishment for faulty Christians.

As a work written in Greek, the author was likely influenced by the general cultural milieu of Hellenistic philosophy of the era. The world's structure as described seemingly implies that heaven is across a vast ocean at the edges of the world, and similar ideas are seen in other Greek works. More generally, fantastic tales involving Greek gods were often set across the seas as places where difficult-to-verify wild tales could occur, such as the works of Homer (the Odyssey), Plato's Timaeus (featuring the story of Atlantis), and the 2nd-century Lucian of Samosata's satirical A True Story. The Apocalypse of Paul can be seen as something of a Christian update to the trope, although it is far more confident in the truth of its revelations than the less-certain stance of the Greek predecessor works.

The author was likely familiar with the Pauline epistles, most clearly 2 Corinthians due to its mention of someone visiting the third heaven, but also other letters of Paul. Some of the ideas, such as Paul's idea of a purified "body" (soma) for the righteous, clearly influence the Apocalypse. However, the Apocalypse of Paul's theology does not always entirely align with the 1st-century epistles, notably its angelology. Paul's work says nothing of angels being custodians of souls in the afterlife, and indicates instead that believers will be the future judges of angels themselves. The Apocalypse of Paul's names for angels were likely influenced by the Apocalypse of Peter, including Temeluchus and the tartaruchi.

== Content ==
The text is primarily focused on a detailed account of Heaven and Hell. The chapters of the Latin manuscript of the text found in Paris are roughly organized as:

- 1–2. Discovery of the revelation.
- 3–6. Prologue: Appeal of creation to God against the sin of man.
- 7–10. The report of the angels to God about the good and wicked deeds of humanity.
- 11–18. Deaths and judgements of the righteous and the wicked.
- 19–30. First vision of Paradise.
- 31–44. Hell. Paul obtains a day of rest on Sunday for the damned.
- 45–51. Second vision of Paradise.

Other manuscripts differ, such as not including the introductory explanation of the discovery, or omitting the second vision of Paradise.

=== Introduction: The sinfulness of man ===
After a discovery narrative that explains the work was found under a house in Tarsus, Paul visits the third heaven. There, the sun, moon, stars, sea, and land complain to God of mankind's sinfulness. God has shown forbearance only to allow humanity to convert and repent. Guardian angels monitor men and describe to God these human activities every morning and every night. Paul watches as both a righteous man and a sinner die, and the reports of the dead sinner's watcher angel are used against him. Paul then turns to the gates and is led by the angel into the third heaven, where he meets the prophets Elijah and Enoch, and is given a tour.

=== Heaven ===
The Apocalypse of Paul goes into considerably more detail than the Apocalypse of Peter on the nature of heaven. In chapters 20–30, heaven has three divisions. "Paradise" is the third heaven and where Paul arrives first, but it is not closely described. Paul then descends into the second heaven afterward, the "Land of Promise", a reinterpretation of the "land of milk and honey" (in heaven, rather than the land of Israel) which is seemingly a holding area for deceased saints who are waiting on the Second Coming of Jesus and the millennial kingdom of God. The Land of Promise is where Jesus will return at the end of time, and is said in some manuscripts to be nebulously to the "east". It is even nicer and more bountiful for ascetics and virgins.

Paul then finds a river or lake, the Acherusian Lake, where the Archangel Michael purifies repentant sinners before allowing them further along. Paul takes a richly decorated boat full of precious metals and stones across it to the first heaven, the "City of Christ". This is where the blessed will reside for eternity, presumably after the millennial age. The city is surrounded by four rivers: a river of honey, a river of milk, a river of wine, and a river of oil. (Note: Possibly this is influenced by Genesis 2 describing four rivers in Eden, suggesting a link between Eden and a future Jerusalem.) Paul does find some dwelling in the City already, such as the Biblical prophets of Judaism and the patriarchs of the twelve tribes. Outside the city are wailing ascetics who were too proud of their asceticism, and are forced to wait for entry until Christ returns and their pride is appropriately chastened. The city itself is subdivided into twelve layers divided by twelve walls with twelve gates, with things becoming continually better and better the closer to the center inhabitants get. Those who deny themselves physical pleasure in the mortal world are rewarded wildly in the afterlife with better places in the City of Christ, closer to the center.

Finally, after the tour of hell (chapters 31–44), Paul returns to "Paradise" in chapters 45–51, but it is unclear if this means the third layer again, heaven in general, or a new fourth layer. It is identified with Eden, and four rivers flow from a tree in which the Spirit of God rests above the tree since the Creation. There Paul meets other Biblical figures, some of which were described as already being in other layers in the earlier passages. It is possible that this account was originally from a separate story that was combined into the Apocalypse of Paul, as it does not entirely cohere with the earlier vision of Heaven. It also includes an anti-Jewish element: Moses tells Paul that Paul was blessed by God as something of a "replacement" for Moses after the Jews betrayed God by murdering Jesus, one of the only times non-Christians are acknowledged explicitly.

=== Hell ===
In hell, those punished are Christians who have erred. While some usual sins such as usury, adultery, and women having sex before marriage are condemned, the Apocalypse of Paul goes beyond this. Various "bad" Christians are made to stand in a river of fire, including Christians who left the church and argued; Christians who took the Eucharist but then fornicated; and Christians who "slandered" other Christians while in church. Christians who did not trust in the Lord are buried in deep pits. Christians who failed to pay attention as the word of God was read in Church are forced to gnaw on their tongues eternally. Christians who commit infanticide are torn to shreds by beasts eternally while also on fire. Church leaders and theologians who preached incorrect doctrine or were simply incompetent in their positions are punished with torture. For example, a church reader who failed to implement the word of God he read during church services in his own life is thrown into a river of fire while an angel slashes his lips and tongue with a razor. Unholy nuns are thrown into a furnace of fire along with a bishop as punishment (in one Latin manuscript, likely a later addition). Failed ascetics are also punished; those who ended their fasts before their appointed time are taunted by abundant food and water just out of reach as they lie parched and starving in hell. Those who wore the habit of a monk or nun while failing to show charity are given new habits of pitch and sulphur, serpents are wrapped around their necks, and fiery angels physically beat them. The worst punishments ("seven times worse" than those described so far) are reserved for theologically deviant Christians, such as those who believe that Jesus's Second Coming will be a "spiritual" resurrection rather than a "physical" resurrection, or who deny that Jesus came in the flesh (docetism). The exact nature of their punishment is left to the imagination; an awful stench rises from a sealed well that hints of their torment below.

One theological oddity is that the text portrays Christians, the angels, and Paul as more merciful than God. Paul expresses pity for those suffering in Hell, but Jesus rebukes him and says that everyone in Hell truly deserves their punishment. The Archangel Michael says he prays continuously for Christians while they are alive, and weeps for the torments the failed Christians endure after it is too late. The twenty-four elders on thrones (presumably the 12 apostles and the 12 patriarchs) as well as the four beasts described in God's throne room in the Book of Revelation also make intercession for the inhabitants of hell. The Christian friends and family of those in Hell also make prayers for the dead that their suffering might be lessened. In responses to the pleas of Paul (or the Virgin Mary in the Apocalypse of the Virgin), Michael, the elders, and the living Christians on Earth, Jesus agrees to release those in hell from their suffering on the day of his resurrection—presumably every Sunday. Manuscripts include variants of the ending: A Coptic manuscript instead describes it as specifically Easter, albeit with a 50-day period afterward, possibly in addition to the Sunday off; the Greek Apocalypse of the Virgin specifically excludes damned Jews from this mercy; and an Armenian manuscript has all sinners released from hell unconditionally.

=== Asceticism ===
Sozomen wrote that the text was popular with monks, which makes sense given the work's sharp focus on them and how their fates differ from ordinary Christians. Those who successfully live an ascetic lifestyle are rewarded far beyond ordinary Christians; those who live an ascetic lifestyle but are too proud are forced to wait for their reward; and those who attempt but fail at an ascetic lifestyle are punished with eternal torture.

== Manuscripts and versions ==
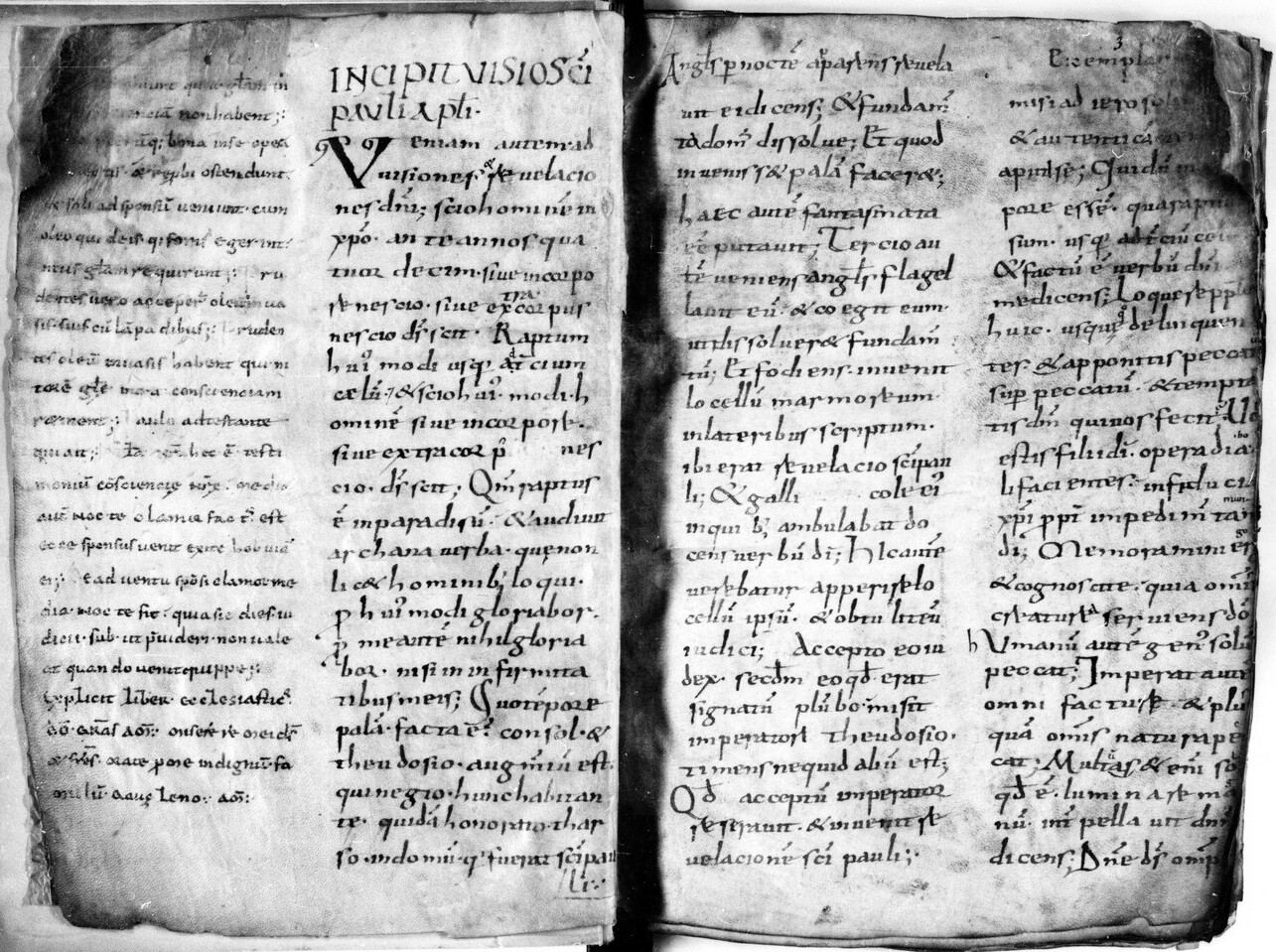
An 8th or 9th century French codex containing a Latin version. The title reads INCIPT VISIO SANCTI PAVLI APOSTOLI. This Paris manuscript was used as the basis for M. R. James's translation and analysis.

Compared to many apocryphal works, the Apocalypse of Paul has an unusually large number of manuscripts to draw from, evincing its popularity. Greek copies of the text are rare, however; those that exist contain many omissions. Of the Eastern versions – Syriac, Coptic, Amharic, Georgian, and Karshuni (Arabic) – the Syriac are considered to be the most reliable. (Note: Not all scholars agree; Lautaro Roig Lanzillotta has argued that the Coptic language version of the Apocalypse should be taken as a reliable witness to the original Greek.) There is an Ethiopic version of the work which features the Virgin Mary in the place of Paul the Apostle, as the receiver of the vision, known as the "Apocalypse of the Virgin". The earliest surviving manuscript is a seventh-century Iranian Syriac codex known as Fonds Issayi 18.

The lost Greek original was translated into Latin as the Visio Pauli, and was widely copied, with extensive variation coming into the tradition as the text was adapted to suit different historical and cultural contexts; by the eleventh century, there were perhaps three main independent editions of the text. From these diverse Latin texts, many subsequent vernacular versions were translated, into most European languages, prominently including German and Czech.

== Reception and influence ==
Ancient writers are generally hostile to the Apocalypse. Augustine called it a fraud that the true church does not accept; Sozomen wrote he investigated it personally and also found it inauthentic; and the 6th-century Gelasian Decree lists it as an apocryphal writing to be rejected. Samuel Anetsi denounces the Armenian version as the work of heretics. Despite this, the Visio Pauli maintained its popularity, hence the large numbers of copies, especially Latin ones. Its importance was great in the 8th–15th centuries. It was one of the most influential sources of medieval thought on the nature of the afterlife.

The Apocalypse was part of an adjustment in how Christians thought about the Last Judgment. In earlier works such as the Apocalypse of John (better known as the Book of Revelation) and the Apocalypse of Peter, the Second Coming of Christ was thought to be imminent, and the judgment of all souls would happen then. The Apocalypse of Paul's conception of a particular judgment where individual Christians are judged immediately after their death would prove more popular and enduring; Anthony Hilhorst writes that this change "explains [the Apocalypse of Paul]'s twelve centuries of success in the Christian world".

The Visio Pauli also influenced a range of other texts. It is particularly noted for its influence on The Divine Comedy of Dante Alighieri, who seems to have been familiar with the work. In Inferno (ii. 28-32), Dante mentions the visit of the "Chosen Vessel" to Hell, presumably a reference to Paul's earlier trip. Other motifs are shared between the Apocalypse of Paul and Dante; for example, both involve sinners standing in rivers (of blood in Inferno, of fire in Paul), with how far up the river reaches on their body corresponding to the severity of the sins being punishment. The Visio is also considered to have influenced the description of Grendel's home in the Old English poem Beowulf. This influence may have been direct or indirect, possibly via the Old English Blickling Homily XVI. The Legend of the Purgatory of St. Patrick seems to draw from the Apocalypse of Paul, which itself then influenced the works of Geoffrey Chaucer.

Tamás Adamik has suggested other influences on fantastic literature in the medieval era. The Dialogues of Gregory the Great, written in 593, may have been a reply to the Apocalypse of Paul but with a more "orthodox" theology. The fourth book of it shares a number of motifs with the Apocalypse of Paul and similar structure, discussing the otherworldly fates of famous people, meetings with prophets, struggles by angels over the good and bad sides of a human soul, and so on. Adamik suggests that the Visio Wettini, the Voyage of Saint Brendan, and the Visio Tnugdali all were likely influenced by the Apocalypse of Paul as well.

== Translations ==
Selected modern English translations of the Latin Paris manuscript of the Apocalypse of Paul (the most studied manuscript) can be found in:

- Duensing, Hugo; Santos Otero, Aurelio de (2003) [1989]. "Apocalypse of Paul". In Schneemelcher, Wilhelm (ed.). New Testament Apocrypha: Volume Two: Writings Relating to the Apostles; Apocalypses and Related Subjects. Translated by Wilson, Robert McLachlan (Revised ed.). Louisville: Westminster Press. pp. 712–748. ISBN 0-664-22722-8. (Duensing made the original translation to German; Santos Otero made the 1989 update to the German translation; Wilson made the translation from German to English)
- Elliott, James Keith (1993). The Apocryphal New Testament. Oxford University Press. pp. 616–644. ISBN 0-19-826182-9.
- Gardiner, Eileen (1989). Visions of Heaven and Hell Before Dante. New York: Italica Press. pp. 13–46. ISBN 9780934977142. (an update of the 1924 M. R. James translation, removing archaic phrasings)

Translations of other manuscripts can be found in:

- "Revelation of Paul" . Ante-Nicene Fathers. Vol. VIII. Translated by Walker, Alexander. Christian Literature Company. 1886. pp. 575–581 – via Wikisource. (Greek text)
- Perkins, Justin (1866). "The Revelation of the Blessed Apostle Paul: Translated from an Ancient Syriac Manuscript". Journal of the American Oriental Society. 8: 183–212. (Syriac text)
- Miscellaneous Coptic texts in the dialect of Upper Egypt. Translated by Budge, E. A. Wallis. 1977 [1915]. pp. 534–574, 1043–1084. (Coptic text)
- Silverstein, Theodore; Hilhorst, Anthony (1997). Cramer, Patrick (ed.). Apocalypse of Paul: A New Critical Edition of Three Long Latin Versions. Cahiers d'orientalisme 21. Geneva. (Latin Arnhem manuscript, Middle German version, other Latin texts)
- Lanzillotta, Lautaro Roig; Van der Vliet, Jacques (2022). The Apocalypse of Paul (Visio Pauli) in Sahidic Coptic: Critical Edition, Translation and Commentary. Brill.
