= Tartaruchi =

Keepers of Tartarus according to the Apocalypse of Paul

Tartaruchi (singular: tartaruchus, meaning "holder of Tartarus") are the keepers of Tartarus (hell), according to the 4th century, non-canonical Apocalypse of Paul. The author describes them as using one hand to choke damned souls, and the other using an "iron of three hooks". Temeluchus is the only tartaruchus named in the work. Tartaruchus is mentioned in the Vision of Saint Paul in chapters 16 and 18

...Let him therefore be delivered unto the angel Tartaruchus that is set over the torments, and let him cast him into the outer darkness where is weeping and gnashing of teeth... [...] ...And I heard a voice saying: Let that soul be delivered into the hands of Tartaruchus, and he must be taken down into hell....

The Tartaruchi are also mentioned in 2 Meqabyan (12:13) "...And before he had finished saying this, the Angels of Death - whose name are called the Thilimyakos [Tartaruchi] - alit and struck him in the heart, dead..."

The Italian and Portuguese word tartaruga ("turtle" or "tortoise") derives from this noun, as may English tortoise and turtle.
