= Adamik =

Adamik or Adámik is a Slavic surname.

Notable people with the surname include:

- Jozef Adámik (born 1985), Slovak footballer
- Katarzyna Adamik (born 1972), Polish film director
- Sabine Adamik, or Sabine Bothe (born 1960), German handball player
- Tamás Adamik (born 1937), Hungarian linguist and professor
- Zoltán Adamik (1928–1992), Hungarian Olympic sprinter
