= Codex Climaci Rescriptus =

Uncial 0250
- New Testament manuscript
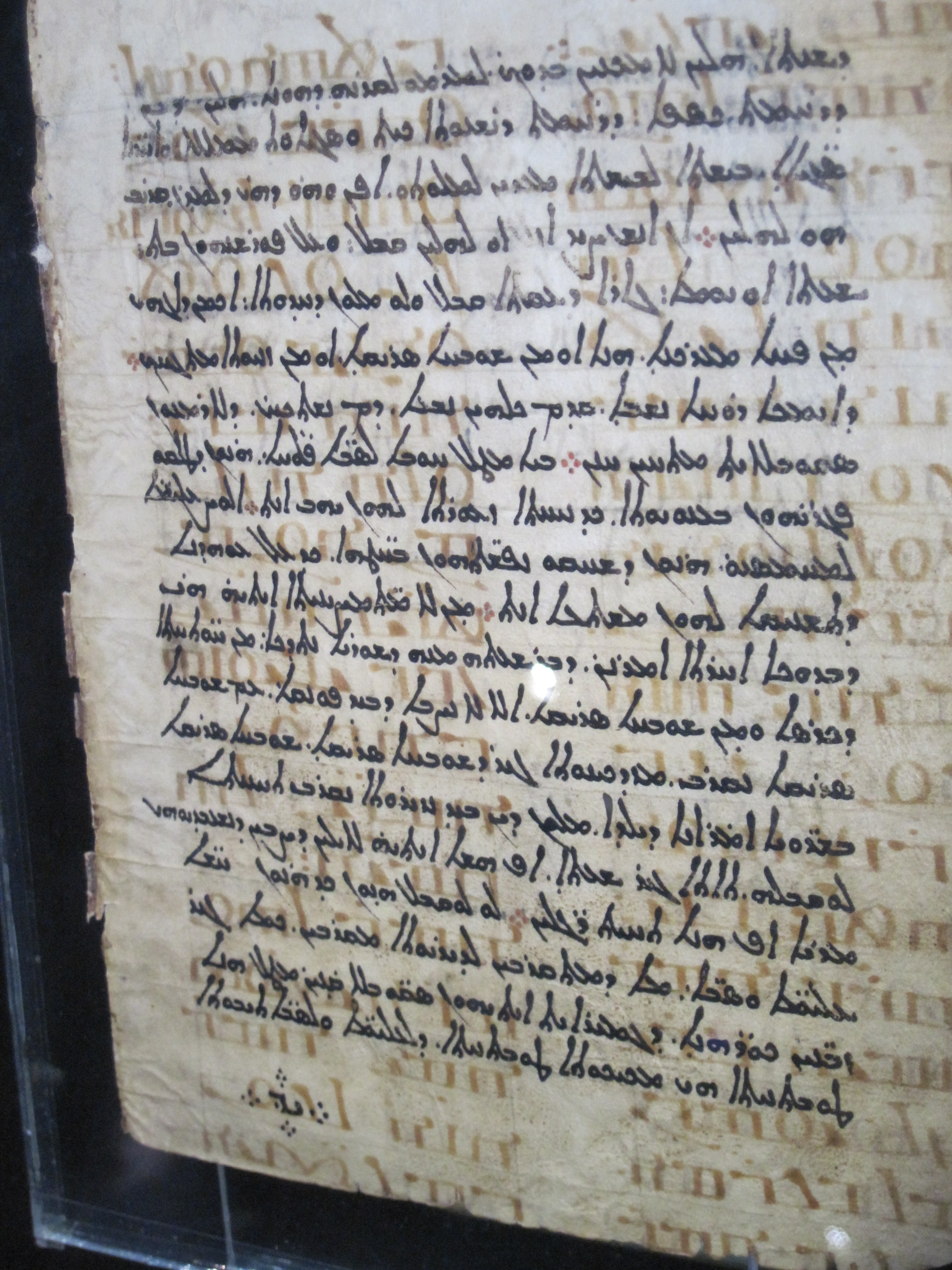
- Name: Codex Climaci Rescriptus
- Text: Gospel of Matthew 21:27–31
- Date: 6th century
- Script: Syriac, Christian Palestinian Aramaic
- Found: Saint Catherine's Monastery Sinai
- Now at: The Green Collection
- Cite: A. S. Lewis, Codex Climaci rescriptus, Horae semiticae, VIII (1909), p. 42; Christa Müller-Kessler and M. Sokoloff, The Christian Palestinian Aramaic New Testament Version from the Early Period. Gospels, Corpus of Christian Palestinian Aramaic, IIA (1998), p. 21.
- Size: 23 cm by 18.5-15.5 cm
- Type: mixed
- Category: III

Codex Climaci Rescriptus is a collective palimpsest manuscript consisting of several individual manuscripts underneath, Christian Palestinian Aramaic texts of the Old and New Testament as well as two apocryphal texts, including the Dormition of the Mother of God, and is known as Uncial 0250 (in the Gregory-Aland numbering) with a Greek uncial text of the New Testament and overwritten by Syriac treatises of Johannes Climacus (hence name of the codex): the scala paradisi and the liber ad pastorem. Paleographically the Greek text has been assigned to the 7th or 8th century, and the Aramaic text to the 6th century. It originates from Saint Catherine's Monastery going by the New Finds of 1975. Formerly it was classified for CCR 5 and CCR 6 as lectionary manuscript, with Gregory giving the number ℓ 1561 to it.

== Description ==
The codex is a 146 folio remnant of ten separate manuscripts, eight of which are in Christian Palestinian Aramaic, which have been dated to the 5th or 6th century CE; and three of which are in Greek, which have been dated to the 7th or 8th century CE.

The Christian Palestinian Aramaic sections contain biblical manuscripts of two Gospels Matthew and Mark, as well as of the Acts of the Apostles and the Epistles, remnant parts of the Old Jerusalem lectionary (CCR 3) with Old and New Testament pericopes, and sections of the early Christian apocryphal Dormition of the Mother of God (Liber Requiei Mariae) as well as one or two unknown homilies on 112 folios (23 by 18.5 cm), written in two columns per page, 18 to 23 lines per page in an adapted Syriac Estrangela square script. This manuscript is the second largest early corpus of Christian Palestinian Aramaic after Codex Sinaiticus Rescriptus from Saint Catherine's Monastery, Sinai for the early period of transmission (5th to 7th CE).

The Greek section contains the text of the four Gospels, with numerous lacunae, on 34 parchment folios (23 by 15.5 cm). Written in two columns per page, 31 lines per page, in uncial letters. According to Ian A. Moir this manuscript contains a substantial record of an early Greek uncial manuscript of the Gospels once at Caesarea, which would have been the sister of Codex Sinaiticus, Codex Vaticanus and Codex Alexandrinus, but is now lost. The Christian Palestinian Aramaic texts were read and edited by Agnes Smith Lewis and the Greek texts by Ian A. Moir,. A few pages remained unidentified until recently. Many of the readings for the Christian Palestinian Aramaic part could be improved for the reeditions by Christa Müller-Kessler and Michael Sokoloff. Two folios are attributed to the Dormition of the Mother of God and were reedited. The missing eighteenth quire could recently be added from the New Finds (1975) in Saint Catherine's Monastery.

== Contents ==
In Christian Palestinian Aramaic:

CCR 1
a Gospel manuscript including texts of Matthew and Mark

Matt. 21:23-41; 27-31; 22:40-23:1; 23:1-25; 24:42-46; 24: 25:14; 26:24-32; 26:40-49; 27:9-19; 27:39-48; 27:64-28:3; 28:4-10

Mark 1:1-10; 1:20-30; 2:2-11; 17-24

CCR 2A
a Gospel of John in Christian Palestinian Aramaic, plus

the Acts and Epistles

Acts 19:31-36; 20:1; 20:2-7; 20:8-14; 21:3-8; 21:9-14; 24:25-25:1; 25:3-26; 26:23-29; 27:1-13; 27:14-27

CCR 2B

Romans 4:17-22; 5:4-15; 6:14-19; 7:2-11; 8: 9-21; 9:30;10:3-9; 15:11-21

I Corin. 1:6-23; 2:10-3:5; 4:1-15; 5:7-6:5; 10:18-31; 12:12-24; 13:4-11; 14:4-7; 14:8-14; 14:14-24; 14:24-37; 15:3-10; 15:10-24; 15:24-49; 16:3-16; 16:16-24

II Corin. 1:1-3; 1:23-2:11; 2:11-3:5; 4:18-5:6; 5:6-12; 6:3-16; 7:3-8

Galat. 1:1-23; 3:20-24; 4:2; 4:4-29; 5:1; 5:24; 6:4-12; 6: 4

Eph. 1:18-2:8; 4:14-27; 5:8-16; 5:17-24

Phil. 2:12-26

Coloss. 4: 6-17

I Thess.1:3-9; 5:15-26

II Thess. 1:3-2:2

II Timothy 3:2-14

Titus 2:7-3:3

Philemon 11-25

1 John 1:1-9

II Peter 1:1-12; 3:16-18

CCR 3
Old Jerusalem lectionary

Exodus 4:14-18

Deut. 6: 4-21; 7:1-26

I Kgds. 1:1; 2:19-29; 4:1-6; 6:5-18

Job 6:1-26; 7: 4-21

Psalms 2:7; 40(41):1; 50(51):1; 56(57):1; 109(110):1; 131(132):1

Proverbs 1:20-22

Isaiah 40:1-8

Jerem. 11:22-12: 4-8

Joel 2:12-14; 2:20

Micah 4:1-3; 4:3-5

Matt. 1:18-25; 2:1-2; 2:2-8; 2:18-23

Luke 1: 26-38

Galatians 4:1-7

Titus 2:11–15

CCR 7
biblical manuscript:

Leviticus 8:18-30; 11:42-12:2-8

CCR 8
Old Jerusalem lectionary

Isaiah 63:9b-11a

Matt. 27:27-41

Mark 15:16-19

John 13:15-29

John 15:19-26; 16:9

Hebrews 3:6; 9:11-28; 10:19-20

CCR 4

Fragment of an unknown apocryphal homily about the life of Jesus;

Dormition of the Mother of God (Liber Requiei Mariae) with chapters 121-122; 125–126 (Ethiopic transmission).

In Greek (CCR 5 & 6)

Matt. 2:12-23; 3:13-15; 5:1-2.4.30-37; 6:1-4.16-18; 7:12.15-20; 8:7.10-13.16-17.20-21; 9:27-31.36; 10:5; 12:36-38.43-45; 13:36-46; 26:75-27:2.11.13-16.18.20.22-23.26-40;

Mark 14:72-15:2.4-7.10-24.26-28;

Luke 22:60-62.66-67; 23:3-4.20-26.32-34.38;

John 6:53-7:25.45.48-51; 8:12-44; 9:12-10:15; 10:41-12:3.6.9.14-24.26-35.44-49; 14:22-15:15; 16:13-18; 16:29-17:5; 18:1-9.11-13.18-24.28-29.31; 18:36-19:1.4.6.9.16.18.23-24.31-34; 20:1-2.13-16.18-20.25; 20:28-21:1.

== Text ==
The Greek text of the codex 0250 is mixed with a predominant element of the Byzantine text-type. Aland placed it in Category III.

Gregory classified it as lectionary (ℓ 1561).

Matthew 8:12

it has ἐξελεύσονται (will go out) instead of ἐκβληθήσονται (will be thrown). This variant is supported only by one Greek manuscript Codex Sinaiticus, by Latin Codex Bobiensis, syr^{c, s, p, pal}, arm, and Diatessaron.

Matthew 8:13

It has additional text (see Luke 7:10): και υποστρεψας ο εκατονταρχος εις τον οικον αυτου εν αυτη τη ωρα ευρεν τον παιδα υγιαινοντα (and when the centurion returned to the house in that hour, he found the slave well) along with א, C, (N), Θ, f^{1}, (33, 1241), g^{1}, syr^{h}.

Matthew 27:35

It has additional text (see John 19:24): Διεμερίσαντο τα ιματια μου εαυτοις, και επι τον ιματισμον μου εβαλον κληρον (they divided my clothes among themselves, and for my clothing they cast lots) along with Δ, Θ, f^{1}, f^{13}, 537, 1424.

== Discovery and present location ==
One folio of the codex was purchased by Agnes Smith Lewis in Cairo in 1895, 89 folios were received from an undisclosed Berlin scholar in 1905, and 48 further ones were acquired in Port Tewfik in 1906. One folio was bought by Alphonse Mingana. This folio had been already in the hand of Agnes Smith Lewis in 1895. Eight leaves (Sinai, Syriac NF 38) surfaced among the New Finds in Saint Catherine's Monastery from 1975.

Until 2010, the codex was housed at the Westminster College in Cambridge, formerly donated by Agnes S. Lewis and Margaret D. Gibson to this College. It was listed for sale at a Sotheby's auction, where it failed to sell on July 7, 2009. In 2010, Steve Green, president of Hobby Lobby, bought the codex directly from Sotheby's after their auction ended unsuccessfully. The codex now resides in the Green Collection. but one folio is still kept in the Mingana Collection, Birmingham, and eight more folios are stored from the New Finds (1975) in the library at Saint Catherine's Monastery, Sinai.

In 2021 parts of the previously lost star catalogue of Hipparchus of Nicaea were discovered in the manuscript.

== See also ==
- List of New Testament uncials
- Textual criticism

== Text editions ==
- Agnes Smith Lewis, Codex Climaci rescriptus, Horae Semiticae, VIII (Cambridge, 1909).
- Hugo Duensing, Zwei christlich-palästinisch-aramäische Fragmente aus der Apostelgeschichte, Zeitschrift für die neutestamentliche Wissenschaft 37, 1938, pp. 42–46.
- Matthew Black, A Palestinian Syriac Leaf of Acts XXI, Bulletin of the John Rylands Library 23, 1939, pp. 201–214.
- Ian A. Moir, Codex Climaci rescriptus grecus (Ms. Gregory 1561, L), Texts and Studies NS, 2 (Cambridge, 1956).
- Christa Müller-Kessler and M. Sokoloff, The Christian Palestinian Aramaic Old Testament and Apocrypha, A Corpus of Christian Palestinian Aramaic, I (Groningen, 1997). ISBN 90-5693-007-9
- Christa Müller-Kessler and M. Sokoloff, The Christian Palestinian Aramaic New Testament Version from the Early Period. Gospels, A Corpus of Christian Palestinian Aramaic, IIA (Groningen, 1998). ISBN 90-5693-018-4
- Christa Müller-Kessler and M. Sokoloff, The Christian Palestinian Aramaic New Testament Version from the Early Period. Acts of the Apostles and Epistles, A Corpus of Christian Palestinian Aramaic, IIB (Groningen, 1998). ISBN 90-5693-019-2
- Christa Müller-Kessler, An Overlooked Christian Palestinian Aramaic Witness of the Dormition of Mary in Codex Climaci Rescriptus (CCR IV), Collectanea Christiana Orientalia 16, 2019, pp. 81–98. https://doi.org/10.21071/cco.v16i0.1101.
- Christa Müller-Kessler, The Missing Quire of Codex Climaci rescriptus Containing 1–2 Corinthians in Christian Palestinian Aramaic (Sin. syr. NF M38N), in Claudia Rapp, Guilia Rossetto, Jana Grusková, Grigory Kessel (eds.), New Light on Old Manuscripts The Sinai Palimpsests and Other Advances in Palimpsest Studies, Veröffentlichungen zur Byzanzforschung, 45; Denkschriften der philosophisch-historischen Klasse, 547, (Vienna: Austrian Academy of Science Press, 2023), pp. 147–170. https://doi.org/10.1553/978OEAW91575s147.
