= Temeluchus =

Angel in Christianity

Temeluchus (also Temelouchus and Temlakos) is an angel described in various early Christian texts. He first appears in the 2nd-century Apocalypse of Peter as a care-taking angel who looks after children who died of infanticide. The phrase may well have literally simply meant "care-taking one" as a description without intending it as a name. Nevertheless, later works refer to an angel by that name, whether from the Apocalypse of Peter or perhaps the Greek "Telémakhos" (literally, "far-away fighter"). He prominently appears in the Apocalypse of Paul, which was popular and influential for centuries in the Middle Ages. There, he largely tortures souls in hell. Temeluchus may have been loosely based on the Greek god Poseidon, as he is depicted as wielding a "great fork" (a trident?) in the Apocalypse of Paul. He and an angel named Tatirokos ("keeper of Tartarus") may have been a matched pair, or even two titles for the same angel. Some later sources refer to him as the leader of the tartaruchi, the angels of torment (probably Satan himself).

== Original sources ==
In the Apocalypse of Peter, an angel looks after dead children slain by their parents. While "Temlakos" probably just meant "care-taking" originally, it is later interpreted as a name:

As for their children, they shall be delivered unto the angel Temlākos (i.e. a care-taking angel). And they that slew them shall be tormented eternally, for God willeth it so.

In the Apocalypse of Paul, he is mentioned in chapter 15 and chapter 18 as God is rendering judgment on sinners:

15 [...] Just is the judgment of God, and there is no respect of persons with God, for whoever has done his mercy he will have mercy on him, and who has not had mercy, neither will God have mercy on him. Let him therefore be delivered unto the angel Tartaruchus (Gr. Temeluchus) that is set over the torments, and let him cast him into the outer darkness, where is weeping and gnashing of teeth, and let him be there until the great day of judgement.

18 [...] Let that soul be delivered into the hands of Temeluchus, and he must be taken down into hell. Let him take him into the lower prison and let him be cast into torments and be left there until the great day of judgment.

In chapter 34, he is seen torturing the soul of a gluttonous and lustful priest:

34 Yet again I looked upon the river of fire, and I saw there an old man who was being dragged along, immersed up to the knees. And Temeluchus came with a great fork of fire with which he pierced the entrails of that old man.

In chapter 40, he is seen tormenting men and women who committed abortion and infanticide:

40 [...] I looked and I saw other men and women upon a spit of fire, and beasts tearing at them, and they were not suffered to say: Lord, have mercy on us. And I saw the angel of torments Temeluchus laying most fierce torments upon them saying: Acknowledge the Son of God. For it was told you before, but when the scriptures of God were read to you, you paid no attention: where the judgment of God is just, for your evil doings have taken hold of you, and brought you into these torments.

His mention in chapter 40 of the Apocalypse of Paul is potentially a callback to the earlier Apocalypse of Peter, although the Apocalypse of Peter attributes this line to Tatirokos, the keeper of Tartarus (potentially seen as another title for the same angel):

In one voice all of those who are in punishment will say, 'Have mercy on us because now we have understood the judgment of God, which he previously proclaimed to us but we did not believe.' And the angel of Tartarus will come and rebuke them with more punishment. And he will say to them, 'Now you would repent, when there is no time for repentance and no life has remained.'

Temeluchus' name is sometimes rendered as Aftemelouchos, Aftemeloukhos, Tartaruchus, Temelouchos, and T'ilimyakos.

He appears in 2 Meqabyan 12:13 (considered canonical in the Ethiopian Orthodox Church), just as the evil king Tsirutsaydan is proclaiming his own immortality:

And before he finished speaking this thing, the Angel of Death whose name is called T'ilimyakos alighted and struck his heart. He died in that hour. As he didn't praise his Creator, he was separated from his beautiful lifestyle and perished, arising from the abundance of his arrogance and the evil of his works.

== In popular culture ==
In the animated series Dead End: Paranormal Park, Temeluchus, voiced by Alex Brightman, is a royal demon who spends much of the show possessing Pugsley, the pet pug of one of the main characters, granting him the ability to speak and other magical powers. He starts out as a power-hungry antagonist bent on taking over the human world, but becomes kinder and more sympathetic as he experiences Pugsley's love for humans.

== See also ==
- List of angels in theology
