= Annals of St Neots =

- Language: Latin
- Date: c. 1120 – c. 1140
- Provenance: Bury St Edmunds Abbey
- Manuscript(s): Cambridge, Trinity College, MS R.7.28 (770), pp. 1-74
- Genre: chronicle
- Length: 75 leaves, five quires; approximately 165 x 113 mm (originally larger format, but the margins have been cut down)
- Period covered: 60 BC – AD 914
- Sources: include Bede's Ecclesiastical History; Cuthbert's Epistola de Obitu Bedae ("Letter on the Death of Bede"); Anglo-Saxon Chronicle; West-Saxon king-lists; Asser's Life of Alfred; Abbo's Passio Sancti Eadmundi ("The Passion of St Edmund"); Norman annals; Annals of the Kings of France; Flodoard's Chronicle; Visio Eucherii ("Vision of Eucherius"); Vision of Charles the Fat; Visio Rollonis ("Vision of Rollo"); Vita Sancti Neoti ("Life of St Neot"); John of Worcester's Chronicle

The Annals of St Neots is a Latin chronicle compiled and written at Bury St Edmunds Abbey in Suffolk, England, sometime around the range from 1120 to 1140. It covers the history of Britain, extending from its invasion by Julius Caesar in 55 BC to the establishment of Normandy in AD 914. Like the Anglo-Saxon Chronicle, it is chiefly concerned with Anglo-Saxon history, but it differs from it in adopting a distinct East Anglian perspective on certain events and weaving a significant amount of Frankish history into its narrative.

== Content ==
The Annals of St Neots are to a large extent 'a patchwork of quotations from the [Anglo-Saxon] Chronicle, Asser, Bede, and other sources. Its dating of events avoids an inaccuracy shared by other Anglo-Saxon Chronicle manuscripts, but it is not clear if this is because it derives from an earlier and more accurate archetype of the Anglo-Saxon Chronicle than do the other Chronicle manuscripts or if they represent astute correction by the compiler of the Annals of St Neots cross referencing the Anglo-Saxon Chronicle with other sources.

== Manuscript ==
Contrary to what the modern title may suggest, the work was not compiled at St Neots in Huntingdonshire. It owes its present title to antiquary John Leland discovered the sole surviving manuscript at St Neots Priory in the 1540s around the time of the Dissolution of the Monasteries. Palaeographical analysis has shown that two hands using Late Caroline script were at work, Scribe A for the first quire (pp. 1–18) and Scribe B for the remaining part. The script is typical of the first half of the 12th century and both hands have been detected in other manuscripts from Bury St Edmunds Abbey in Suffolk . According to Dumville, the evidence thus suggests the manuscript was compiled at Bury St Edmunds Abbey sometime between or around the years 1120 to 1140.

After Leland's discovery, the manuscript passed into the possession of Matthew Parker (d. 1575), Archbishop of Canterbury, who supplied various annotations. Later, the dean of the college, Thomas Nevile (d. 1615), donated the manuscript to Trinity College, Cambridge, where it is preserved under the shelfmark R.7.28. It is bound together with several unrelated documents, which form the first 74 leaves of the compilation.
