= Minuscule 537 =

Religious document

- New Testament manuscript
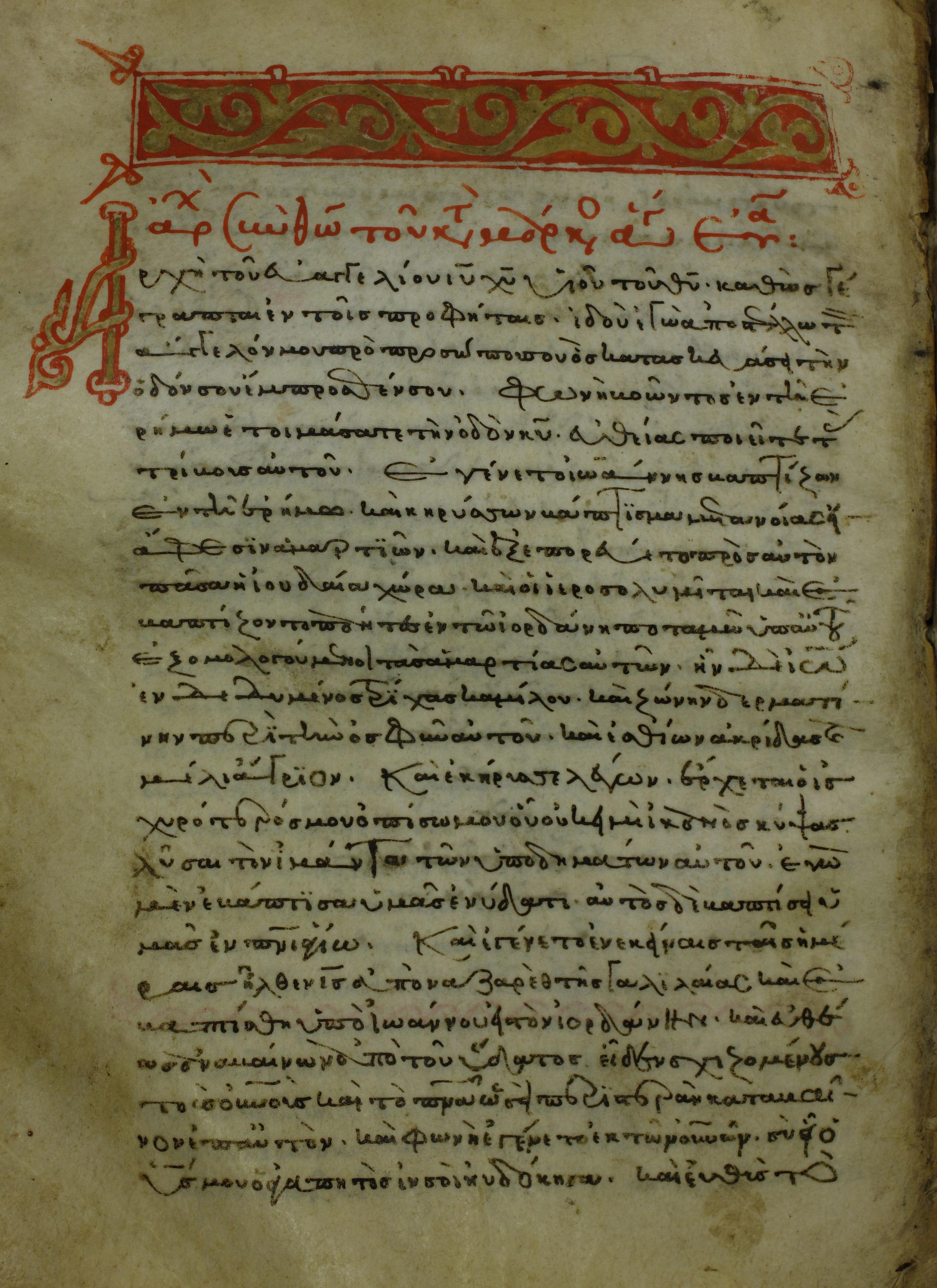
- The first page of Mark
- Text: Gospels
- Date: 12th century
- Script: Greek
- Now at: University of Michigan
- Size: 17.8 cm by 13.2 cm
- Type: Byzantine text-type / mixed
- Category: none
- Hand: carelessly written
- Note: marginalia

Minuscule 537 (in the Gregory-Aland numbering), ε 334 (in Soden's numbering), is a Greek minuscule manuscript of the New Testament, on a parchment. Palaeographically it has been assigned to the 12th century. Scrivener labelled it by number 550. The manuscript was prepared for liturgical use, its marginalia are not complete. It has survived until the present day in complete condition.

Currently it is housed at the University of Michigan. It is available in a digital form on the internet.

== Description ==
The codex contains a complete text of the four Gospels, on 144 parchment leaves (size 17.8 cm by 13.2 cm). The text is written in one column per page, 29 lines per page. The headpieces and large initial letters are decorated. It has breathings (spiritus asper and spiritus lenis) and accents.

It is carelessly written; the error of itacism is very common (983 in all), especially ε for αι, ο for ω, οι for η, η for ει, etc. According to Scrivener it has 16 omissions by ομοιορτελευτον (with the same beginning twice), iota adscriptum twice, iota subscriptum 52 times. N εφελκυστικον occurs 578 times, a hiatus 6 times.

It contains Lectionary markings at the margin (for liturgical service), a few τιτλοι (in red) were added by a later hand, many numbers of the Ammonian Sections (in Mark 237 Sections, the last section in 16:14), more often without references to the Eusebian Canons at the margin (written below Ammonian Section numbers), which are only partially inserted.

At the end of the Gospel of John it contains foreign matter: αρ της φυσεως των ζωων και ερμηνειας του εν αγιοις πρς ημων ιω του χρυσοστομου περι φυσιολογιας. Ο φυσιολογος καλος ελεγξει περι του λεοντος κ.τ.λ.

== Text ==
The Greek text of the codex is a representative of the Byzantine, but with numerous alien readings. Hermann von Soden classified it to the textual family I^{κ}. Aland did not place it in any Category. According to the Claremont Profile Method it is represents textual family K^{x} in Luke 10 and Luke 20, but in Luke 1 it has Π^{a} text.

The Genealogy of Jesus in Luke presents many variations from the common text (vv. 19, 26, 30; 26–34 confused). According to F. H. A. Scrivener it has notable readings in Matthew 11:17; 13:22; 27:49; Luke 18:2; John 6:57; 8:38.

It lacks the text of the Pericope Adulterae (John 7:53-8:12).

Matthew 27:35 is given in full (τα ιματια μου εαυτοις, και επι τον ιματισμον μου εβαλον κληρον), as in codices Δ, Θ, 0250, f^{1}, f^{13}, 1424.

There are many corrections in a margin.

Textual variants

The words after the bracket are the readings of the codex.

Matthew 11:17 εκοψασθε ] ευξασθε
Matthew 13:22 απαθη ] αγαπη
Matthew 27:49 – verse omitted
Mark 7:33 omit – εις τα ωτα αυτου
Luke 2:25 ευλαβης ] ευσεβης
Luke 14:5 ανασπασει ] αναστησει
Luke 18:2 πολει ] τοπω
Luke 20:41 λεγουσι ] λεγουσι τινες
John 6:40 δε ] γαρ
John 6:57 ζων ] omit
John 8:38 ποιειτε ] νοειτε

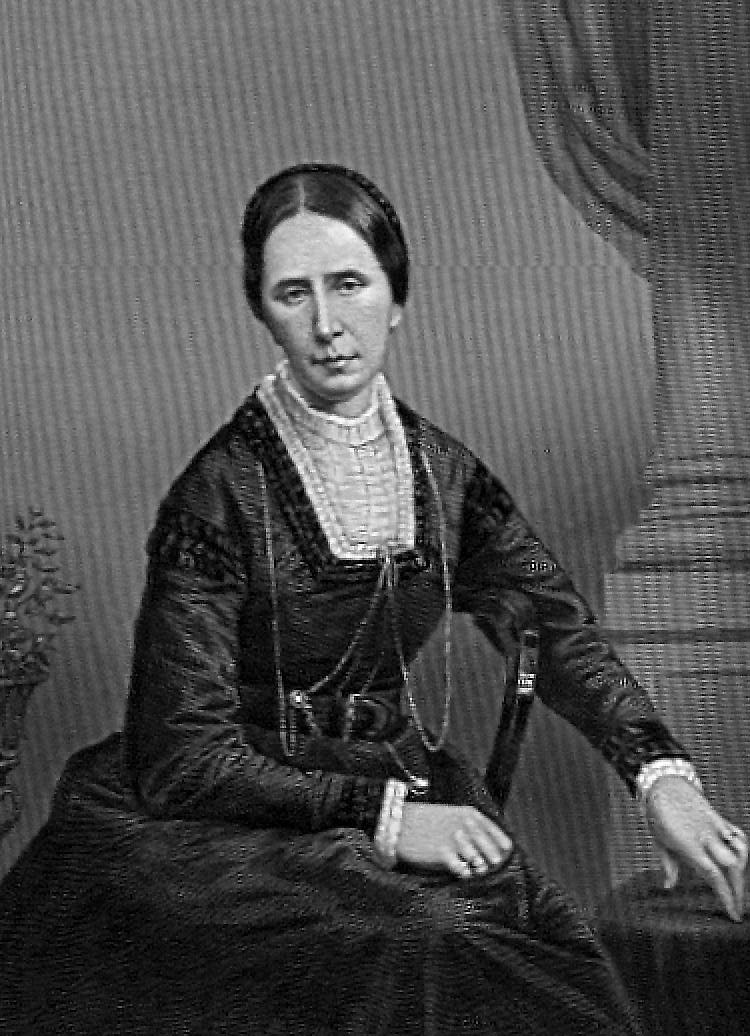
The Lady Burdett-Coutts

== History ==
Scrivener dated the manuscript to the 12th century, C. R. Gregory to the 13th century. Currently the manuscript is dated by the INTF to the 12th century.

Of the history of the codex 537 nothing is known until the year 1864, when it was in the possession of a dealer at Janina in Epirus. In 1864 the manuscript was purchased by Baroness Burdett-Coutts (1814–1906), a philanthropist, together with other Greek manuscripts (among them codices 532-546). They were transported to England in 1870–1871.

The manuscript was presented by Burdett-Coutts to Sir Roger Cholmely's School, and was housed at the Highgate (Burdett-Coutts II. 13), in London. In 1922 it was acquired for the University of Michigan. The manuscript was described by K. W. Clark in 1937.

The manuscript was added to the list of New Testament manuscripts by F. H. A. Scrivener (550) and C. R. Gregory (537). It was examined and collated by Scrivener. Gregory saw it in 1883.

It is currently housed at the University of Michigan (Ms. Inv. No. 19) in Ann Arbor.

== Gallery ==
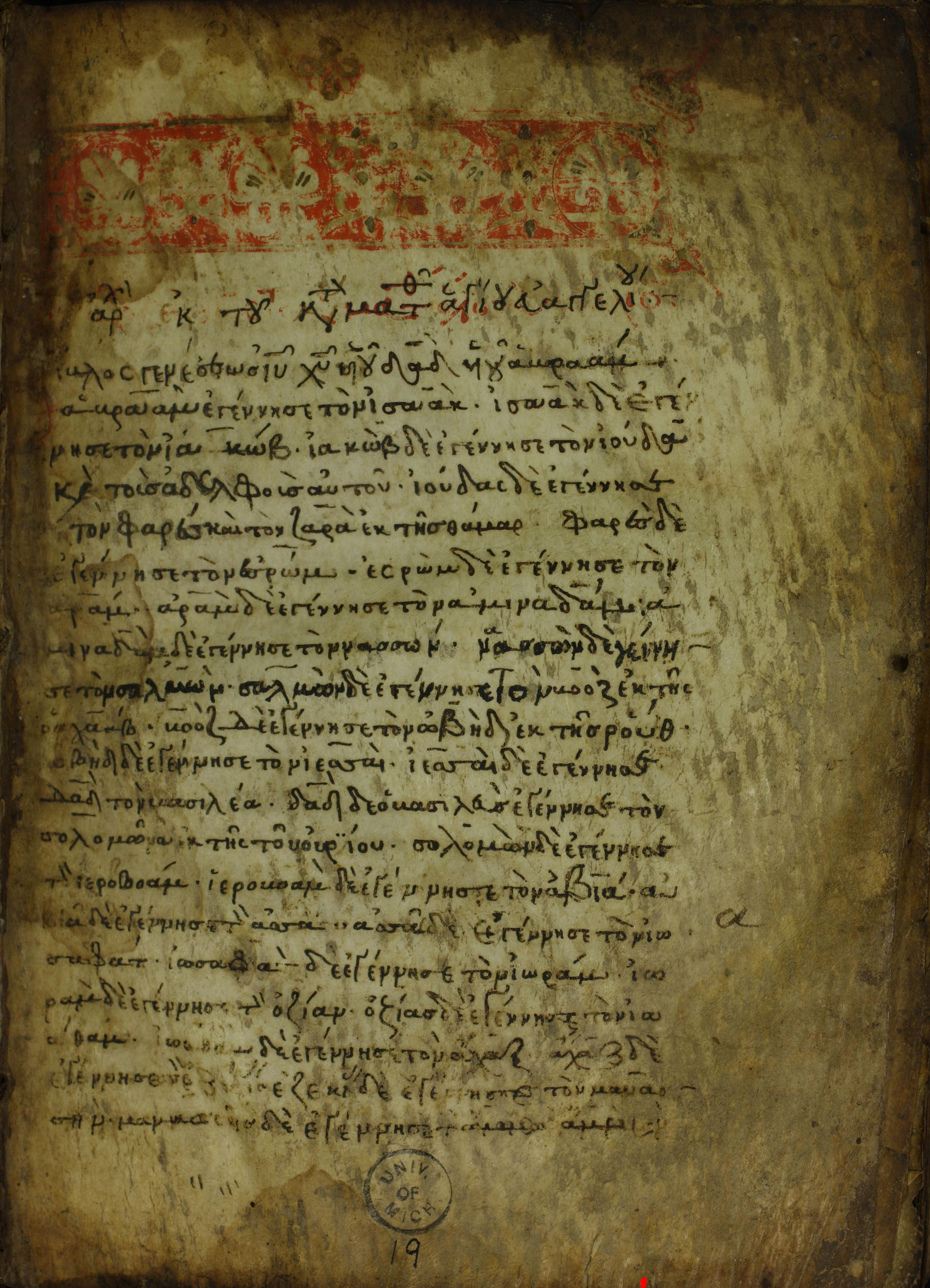
Folio 2 recto; the first page of Matthew

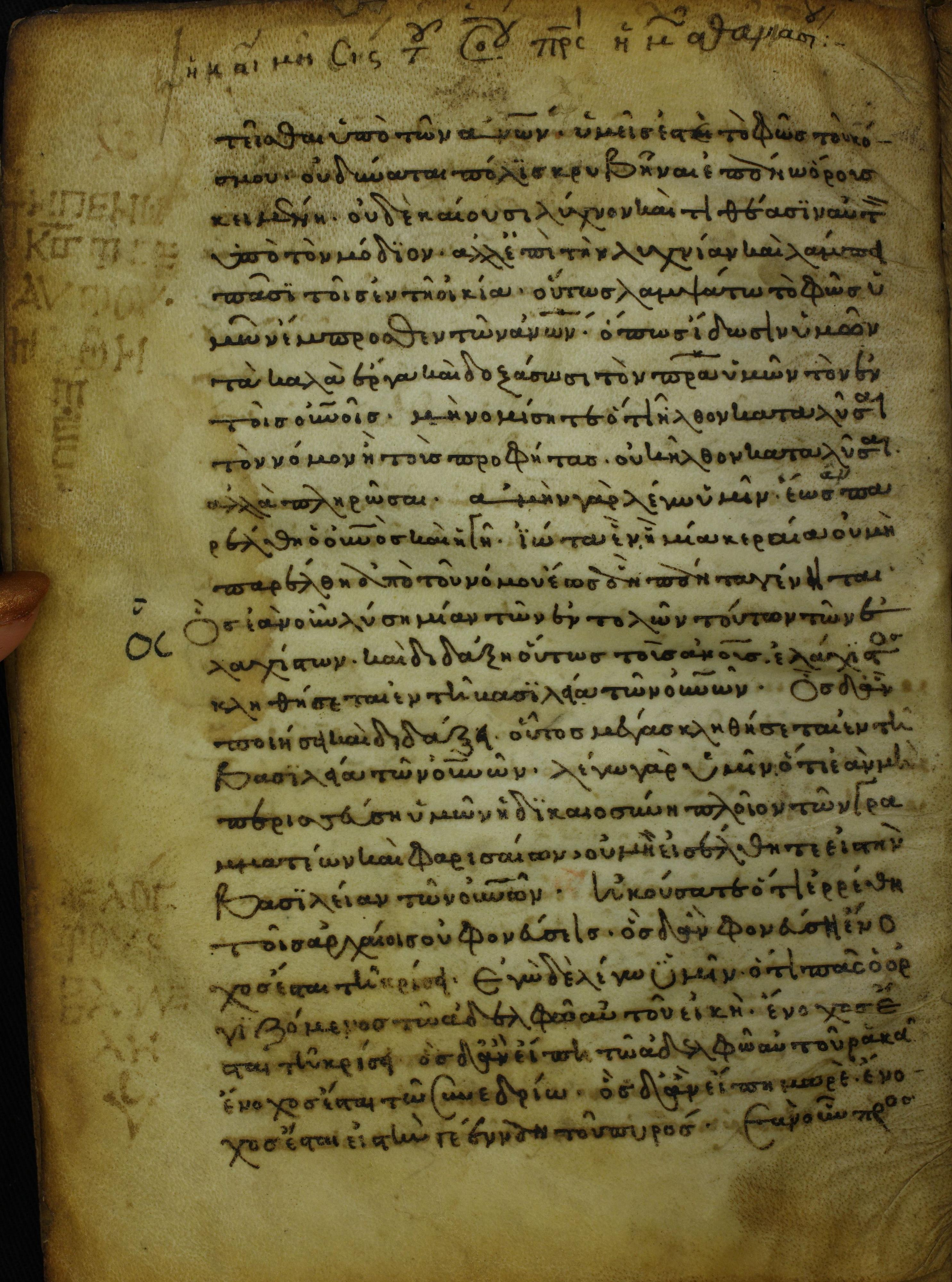
Folio 6 verso; some uncial notes at the left margin

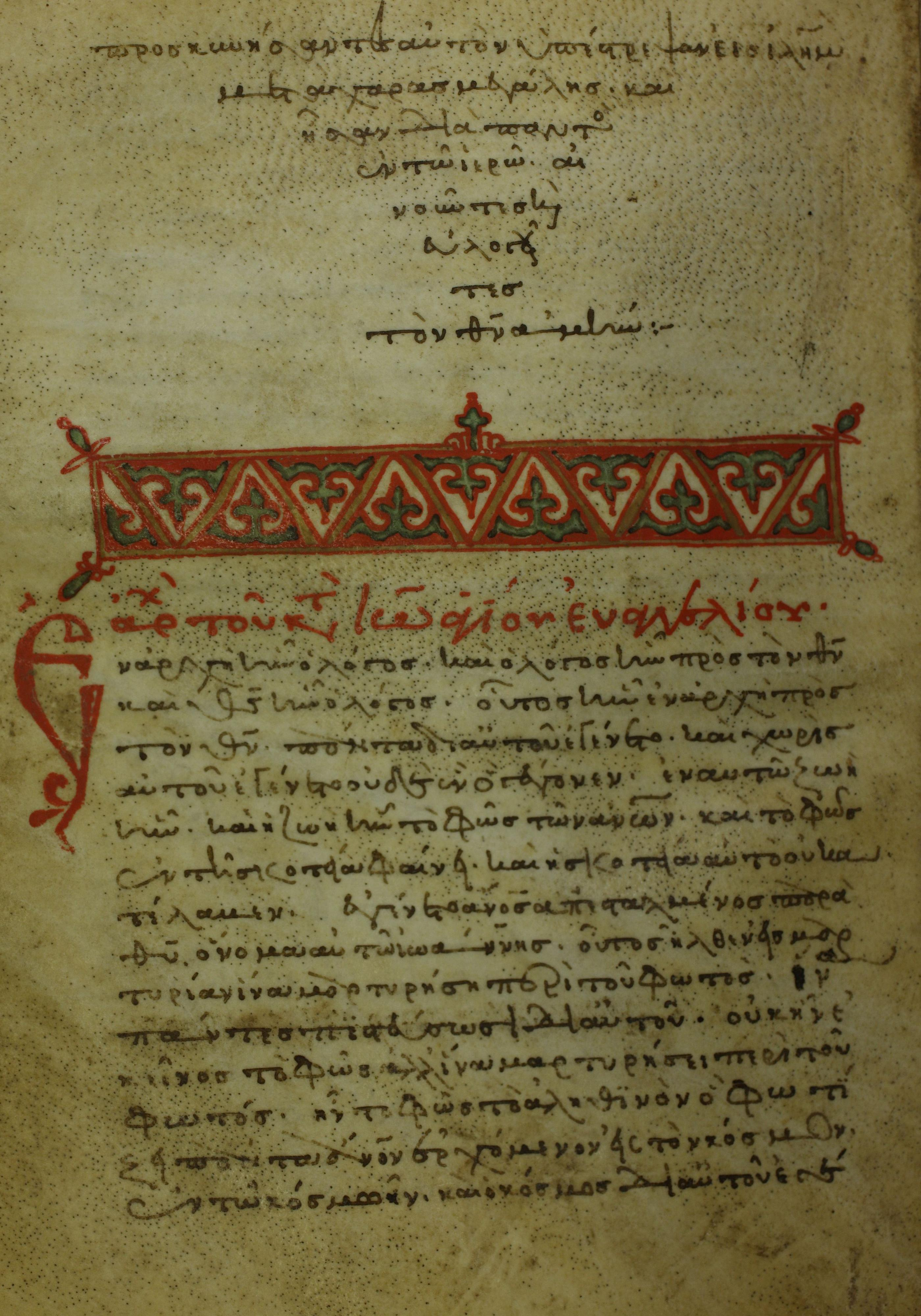
The first page of John

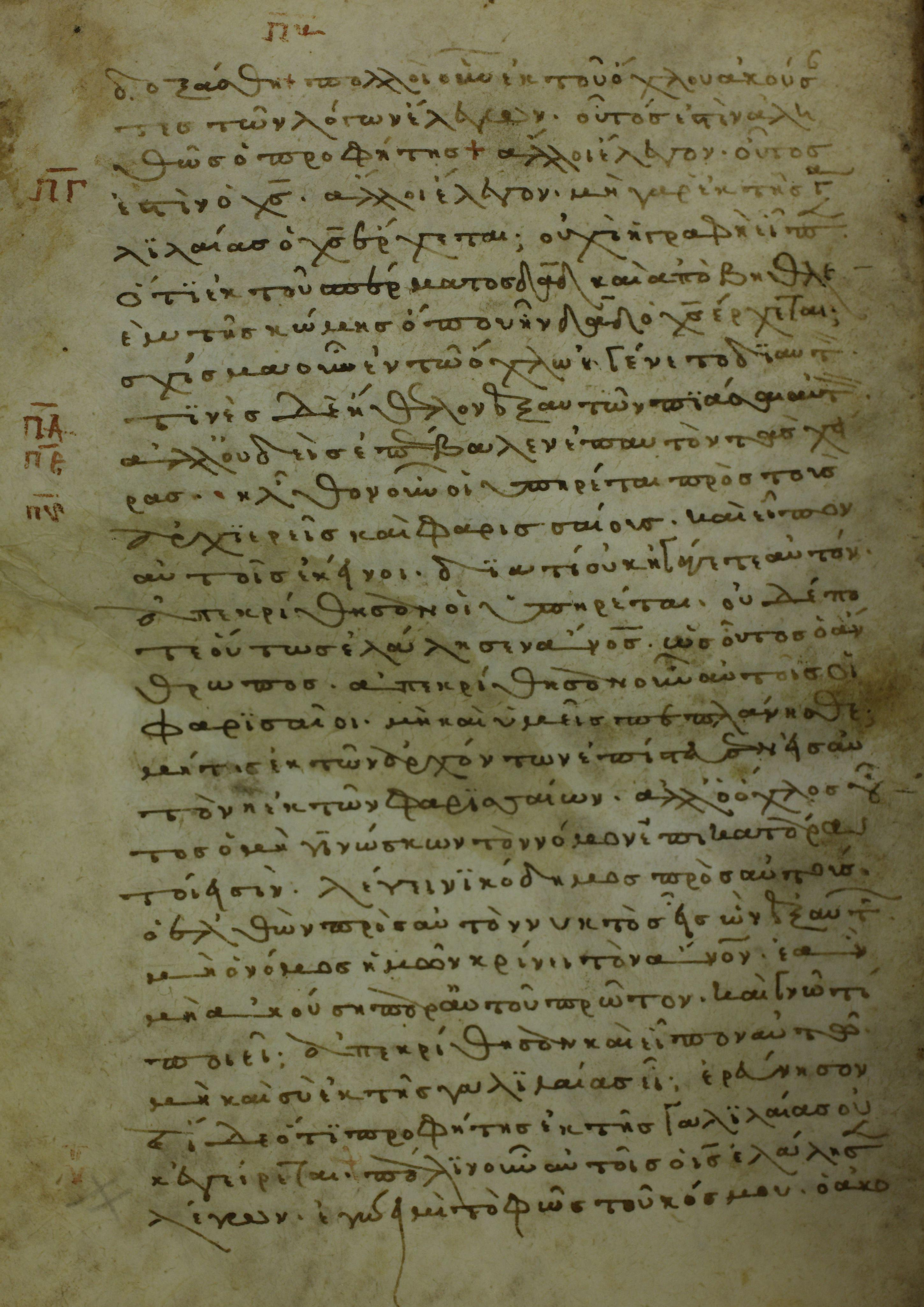
Folio 121 verso with text of John 7:40–8:12; 7:53–8:11 is omitted (second line from the bottom)

== See also ==
- List of New Testament minuscules
- Biblical manuscript
- Textual criticism
