= Theodore Silverstein =

American professor of medieval literature (1904–2001)

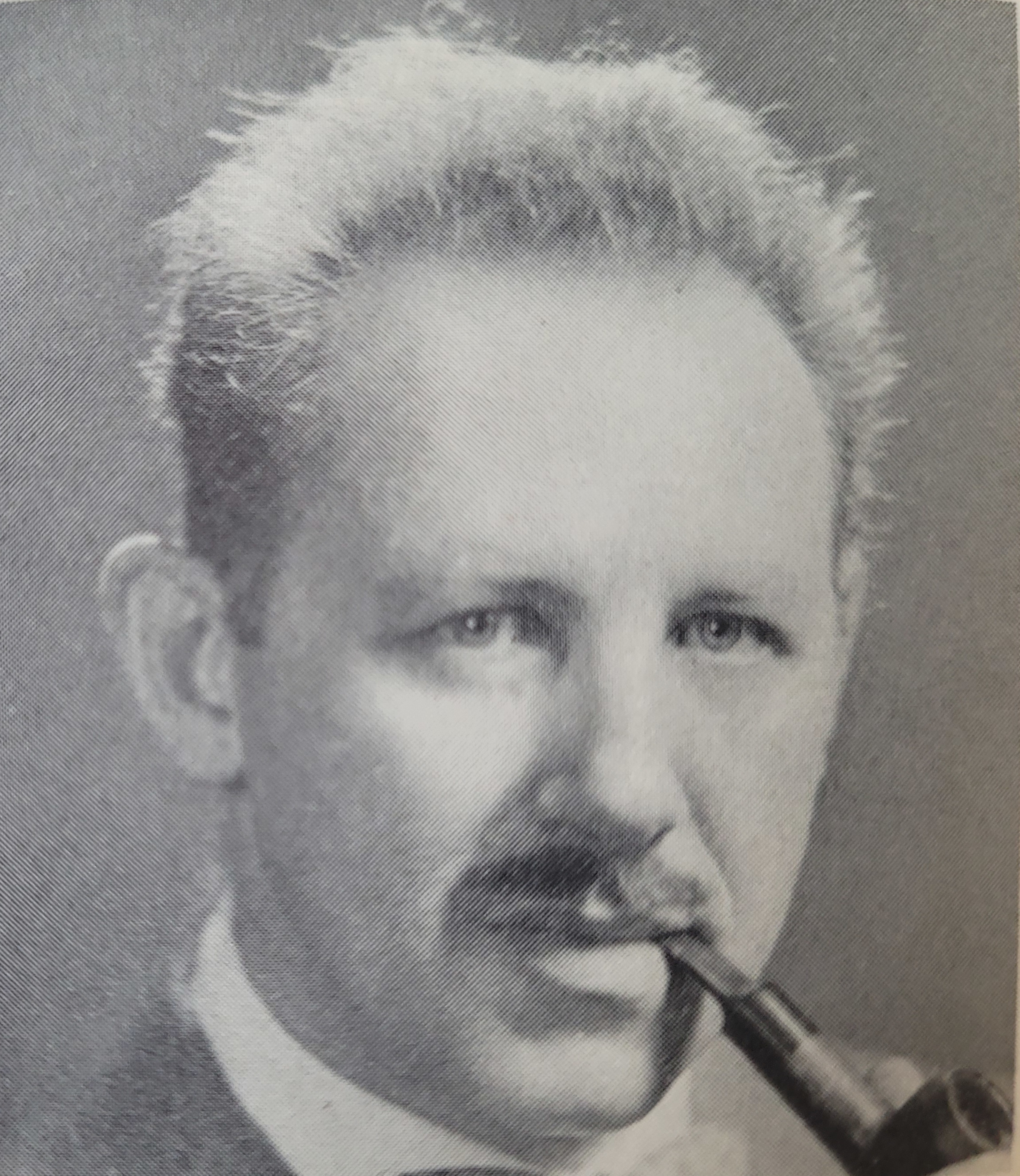
Theodore Silverstein, picture from around 1950–1951

Theodore Silverstein (October 11, 1904 – September 1, 2001) was a British-born American scholar of medieval literature. His focuses for research included Middle English poetry and medieval poetry in general; Dante's The Divine Comedy; the story of Sir Gawain and the Green Knight; and the 4th-century Apocalypse of Paul (Visio Pauli), a popular and influential work in the Middle Ages. Silverstein initially taught at the University of Kansas City. He then served in the United States Army Air Forces as an intelligence officer from 1942 to 1945 during World War II, specializing in interrogating captured German and Italian pilots and analyzing intercepted Luftwaffe communications. He was a Professor of English at the University of Chicago from 1947 to 1973, after which he took emeritus status.

== Biography ==
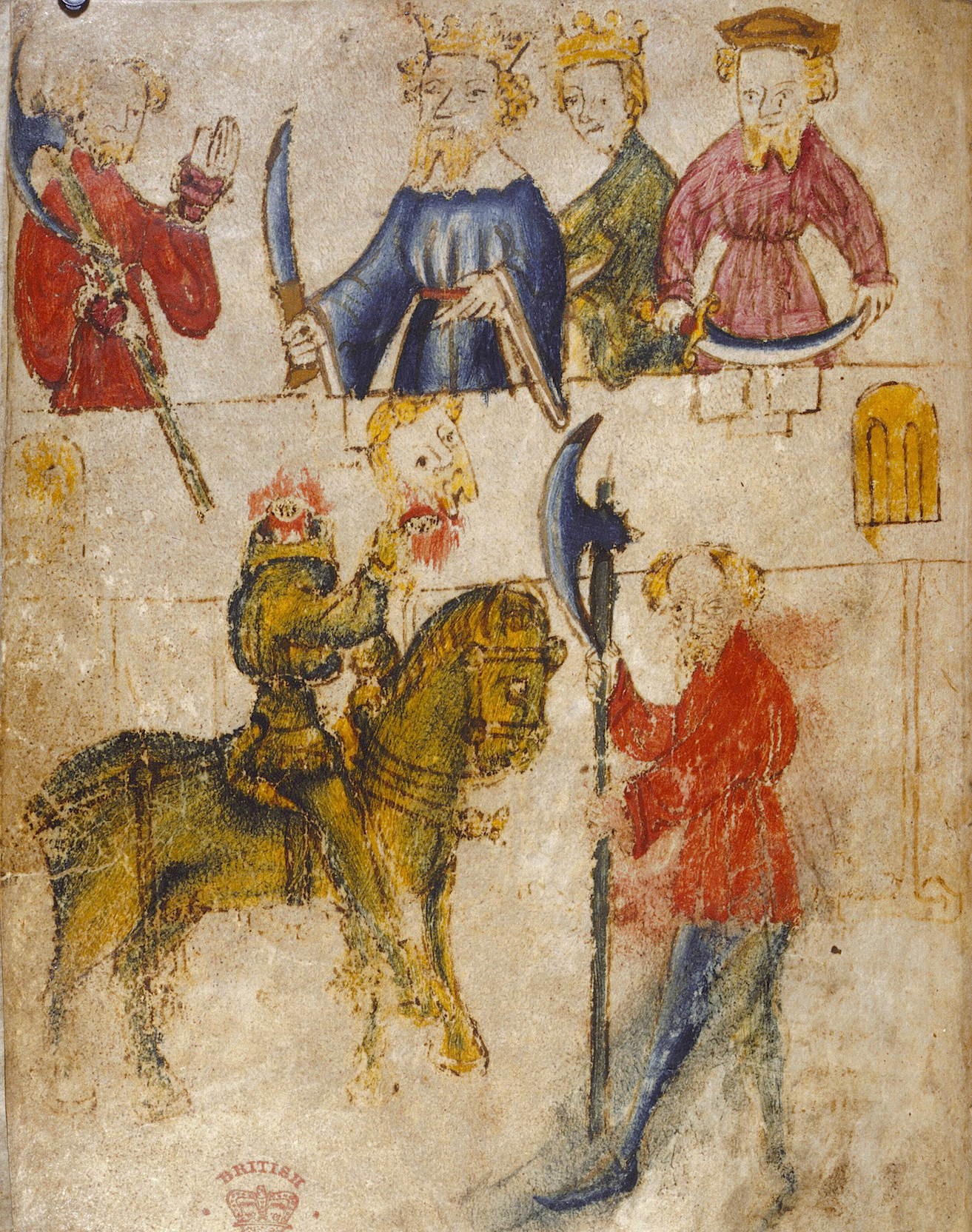
Silverstein published a journal article on the art of Sir Gawain and the Green Knight in 1964, one of his scholarly research areas.

Hymen Theodore Silverstein was born on October 11, 1904, to David Silverstein and Nellie Dobson in Liverpool, England. His family emigrated to Boston in 1910. He attended the Boston Latin School, which gave him an early grounding in a classical education. He attended nearby Harvard University for both college and graduate studies. He earned his bachelor's degree in 1926, a master's degree in 1927, and a PhD in 1930. He also taught while a graduate student. He both worked with and studied under literary scholars John Livingston Lowes, Edward Kennard Rand, and George Lyman Kittredge. In 1930, he married his first wife, Bertha Alexander.

Much of his early scholarship was on the Apocalypse of Paul, an apocryphal work attributed to Paul the Apostle that was quite popular in the Middle Ages as a guide to how the afterlife works, as it included tours of both heaven and hell. After publishing several journal articles on the topic in the early 1930s, in 1935 he published Visio Sancti Pauli: The History of the Apocalypse in Latin, Together with Nine Texts, one of the definitive books on it and its Latin recensions. He also published several works on Dante's The Divine Comedy, including its potential points of inspiration from the Apocalypse of Paul and the Visio Karoli Grossi. Despite his skill, Harvard did not offer him a tenured position; it has been speculated this might be related to informal Jewish quotas of the period that prevented "too many" Jews from being hired. In 1938, he left for the University of Kansas City to take a position as assistant professor of English. The University of Kansas City was then a private college; it later became part of the public University of Missouri. There, he met his future second wife Mary Poindexter.

The United States entered World War II in December 1941, and Silverstein enlisted in the United States Army Air Forces in 1942. There, using his fluency of Italian and German, he first worked in North Africa and Italy interrogating captured German and Italian pilots; he later worked in a unit that dealt with intercepted communications of Luftwaffe pilots, and relayed them to Allied pilots. The unit even briefly requisitioned the Eiffel Tower for its work late in the war to better intercept German radio signals. He reached the rank of major and unit commander. During his time in the Army, he was involved in a gun mishap where he accidentally shot his superior officer in the groin. It was apparently a measure of respect for his value to the unit that his superior laughed it off and kept him around; the officer called Silverstein "the finest intelligence officer in the Western Theater."

After the war, Silverstein and his first wife divorced, and he and Mary Poindexter married. At his wife's request, he dropped his first name "Hymen". Silverstein was awarded a Guggenheim Fellowship in 1946 in medieval literature; this was enough to attract the interest of the University of Chicago, which hired him as an assistant professor of English in 1947. His work as a medievalist was praised for showing the more cultured and respectable part of an era widely considered the "Dark Ages" to the public at the time.

Silverstein took emeritus status and retired from teaching in 1973, but stayed in the Chicago area. He continued to work, however; he published a well-regarded modern English translation of Sir Gawain and the Green Knight in 1974 and a Middle English critical edition in 1984. In 1997 at the age of 93, he and co-author Anthony Hilhorst published Apocalypse of Paul: A New Critical Edition of Three Long Latin Versions, a return to the subject of his 1935 book while a fresh Ph.D, and one he had published journal articles on in the decades since.

Silverstein died on September 1, 2001, in Chicago.

== Appraisal ==
Silverstein was praised for coming at medieval English literature from a different perspective than many medievalists, who often were Anglo-Saxon (Old English) scholars. Silverstein instead concentrated more on the Latin precedents and influences for medieval "vernacular" literature, as Latin texts were a major influence in the period. For Silverstein, medieval Latin was never a dead language.

== Selected works ==
- Silverstein, Theodore (1931). "The Weeping Statue and Dante's Gran Veglio". Harvard Studies and Notes in Philology and Literature 13. Cambridge: Harvard University Press. pp. 165–184.
- Silverstein, Theodore (1935). Visio Sancti Pauli: The history of the Apocalypse in Latin, together with nine texts. London: Christophers.
- Silverstein, Theodore (1936). "Did Dante Know the Vision of St. Paul?". Harvard Studies and Notes in Philology and Literature 19. Cambridge: Harvard University Press. pp. 231–247.
- Silverstein, Theodore (1948). "The Fabulous Cosmogony of Bernardus Silvestris". Modern Philology. 46 (2): 92–116. doi:10.1086/388791. JSTOR 434621. S2CID 162102729.
- Silverstein, Theodore (1955). "Liber Hermetis Mercurii Triplicis De Vi Rerum Principiis". Archives d'histoire doctrinale et littéraire du Moyen Age. 22: 217–302. JSTOR 44403659.
- Silverstein, Theodore (1957). Medieval Latin Scientific Writings in the Barberini Collection: A provisional catalogue. Chicago: University of Chicago Press.
- Silverstein, Theodore (1971). Medieval English Lyrics. York medieval texts. London: Edward Arnold. (Published in the United States under the title English Lyrics Before 1500)
- Silverstein, Theodore (1974). Sir Gawain and the Green Knight: A Comedy for Christmas. Chicago: University of Chicago Press. (translation into modern English)
- Silverstein, Theodore (1984). Sir Gawain and the Green Knight: A New Critical Edition. Chicago: University of Chicago Press. (Middle English edition)
- Silverstein, Theodore; Hilhorst, Anthony (1997). Cramer, Patrick (ed.). Apocalypse of Paul: A New Critical Edition of Three Long Latin Versions. Cahiers d'orientalisme. Geneva.
- Silverstein, Theodore (2002). Jacobs, John C. (ed.). Literate Laughter: Critical Essays in Medieval Narrative. Bern: P. Lang. ISBN 0-8204-5051-0. (posthumous collection)
