= Codex Sinaiticus Rescriptus =

Collection of ancient manuscripts

Codex Sinaiticus Rescriptus, mostly originating in Saint Catherine's Monastery, Sinai, is a collection of nineteen Christian Palestinian Aramaic palimpsest manuscripts containing Old Testament, Gospel and Epistles pericopes of diverse Lectionaries, among them two witnesses of the Old Jerusalem Lectionary, various unidentified homilies along with two by John Chrysostom, hagiographic texts such as the Life of Pachomios, the Martyrdom of Philemon Martyrs, and the Catecheses by Cyril of Jerusalem. The palimpsests manuscripts are recycled parchment material that were erased and reused by the tenth-century Georgian scribe Ioane-Zosime for overwriting them with homilies and a Iadgari (979–980 AD). Part of the parchment leaves (Sin. Georg. 34) had been brought by him from the Monastery of Saint Sabas, south of Jerusalem in the Kidron Valley, when he moved to St Catherine's Monastery and became their librarian. In the nineteenth century most of the codex was removed from the monastery at two periods. C. Tischendorf took two thirds in 1855 and 1857 with the Codex Sinaiticus to St Peterburg and handed it over to the Imperial Library, now the National Library of Russia, and the remaining third left on a clandestine route [so-called collection of Dr Friedrich Grote (1862-1922)] and found its way into various European and later also into US collections, at present in a Norwegian collection. From the New Finds of 1975 in the Monastery of Saint Catherine missing folios of some of the underlying manuscripts could be retrieved (Sinai, Georgian NF 19; 71), with one connected to Princeton, Garrett MS 24.

== Manuscripts ==
CSRa
Old Jerusalem Lectionary with Old Testament and Epistles pericopes
CSRb
Old Jerusalem Lectionary with Old Testament pericopes
CSRc
Gospel Lectionary with Eusebian Canons and Ammonian sections
CSRd
Lectionary with Gospel pericopes
CSRe
Lectionary with Gospel pericopes
CSRf
Gospel manuscript
CSRg
Gospel manuscript
CSRh
Praxapostolos (Acts of the Apostles)
CSRi
Catecheses of Cyril of Jerusalem
CSRj
Unknown homily (Ezechiel 3:18; 33:13); John Chrysostom's homily of the Prodigal Son
CSRk
Unknown homily (1 Kingdoms 17)
CSRl
Vita of Pachomios (Paralipomena)
CSRm
Martyrdom of Philemon
CSRn
Unidentified
CSRo
Unidentified
CSRp
Unidentified
[CSRq]
Dormition of the Mother of God Transitus Mariae
[CSRr]
Dormition of Mother of God Transitus Mariae(unclear classification)
[CSRs]
John Chrysostom, Homily de poenitentia

== See also ==
- Biblical manuscript – Handwritten copy of a portion of the Bible
- Codex Sinaiticus – 4th-century handwritten Bible copy in Greek
- Differences between codices Sinaiticus and Vaticanus
- Eusebian Canons – System of dividing the Gospels used in the Middle Ages
- Fifty Bibles of Constantine – Set of books commissioned in 331
- John Chrysostom – Archbishop of Constantinople (347–407)
- Lectionary – Book of approved scripture readings in Abrahamic religions
- List of New Testament uncials

== Text editions ==
- Jan Pieter Nicolaas Land, Anecdota Syriaca IV (Leiden, 1875), pp. 177–233 [Latin], 103–224 [Syropalestinian], pls. I–VI.
- Hugo Duensing, Christlich-palästinisch-aramäische Texte und Fragmente (Göttingen, 1906).
- Hugo Duensing, Nachlese christlich-palästinisch aramäischer Fragmente, NAWG, phil.-hist. Kl. 5 (Göttingen, 1955).
- Hugo Duensing, Neue christlich-palästinische-aramäische Fragmente, NAWG, phil.-hist. Kl. 9 (Göttingen, 1944).
- Christa Müller-Kessler and Michael Sokoloff, The Christian Palestinian Aramaic Old Testament and Apocrypha, Corpus of Christian Palestinian Aramaic, I (Groningen, 1997). ISBN 90-5693-007-9
- Alain Desreumaux, Codex sinaiticus Zosimi rescriptus, Histoire du Texte Biblique 3 (Lausanne, 1997). ISBN 2-9700088-3-1
- Christa Müller-Kessler and Michael Sokoloff, The Christian Palestinian Aramaic New Testament Version from the Early Period. Gospels, Corpus of Christian Palestinian Aramaic, IIA (Groningen, 1998). ISBN 90-5693-018-4
- Christa Müller-Kessler and Michael Sokoloff, The Christian Palestinian Aramaic New Testament Version from the Early Period. Acts of the Apostles and Epistles, Corpus of Christian Palestinian Aramaic IIB (Groningen, 1998). ISBN 90-5693-019-2
- Christa Müller-Kessler and Michael Sokoloff, The Catechism of Cyril of Jerusalem in the Christian Palestinian Aramaic Version, A Corpus of Christian Palestinian Aramaic, V (Groningen, 1999). ISBN 90-5693-030-3
- Christa Müller-Kessler, Codex Sinaiticus Rescriptus. A Collection of Christian Palestinian Aramaic Manuscripts, Le Muséon 127, 2014, pp. 263–309.
- Christa Müller-Kessler, Neue Fragmente zu den Katechesen des Cyrill von Jerusalem im Codex Sinaiticus Rescriptusi (Georg. NF 19, 71) mit einem zweiten Textzeugen (Syr. NF 11) aus dem Fundus des St. Katherinenklosters, Oriens Christianus 104, 2021, pp. 25–66.
- Christa Müller-Kessler, Piecing together Christian Palestinian Aramaic Texts under Georgian Manuscripts (St Petersburg, NLR, Syr. 16; Sinai, Georg. NF 19, 71; Oslo, Martin Schøyen MS 35, 37; Princeton, Garrett MS 24; Göttingen, Syr. 17, 19, 23, 25), Digital Kartvelology 1, 2022, pp. 25–49. https://doi.org/10.62235/dk.1.2022.7265
- Christa Müller-Kessler, The Early Jerusalem Lectionary Tradition in Christian Palestinian Aramaic (5th–7th Centuries AD): Lections Containing Unattested Old and New Testament Pericopes in Unpublished Palimpsests (Sinai, Greek NF MG 32; Georgian NF 19, 71), Le Muséon 134, 2023, pp. 201–263.
- Christa Müller-Kessler, Addendum to John Chrysostom’s Homily de poenitentia (CPG 4631; PG 60, 765–768) in Christian Palestinian Aramaic, Digital Kartvelology 2, 2023, pp. 170–176. https://doi.org/10.62235/dk.2.2023.7475
