= Tartarus =

Place and deity in Greek mythology

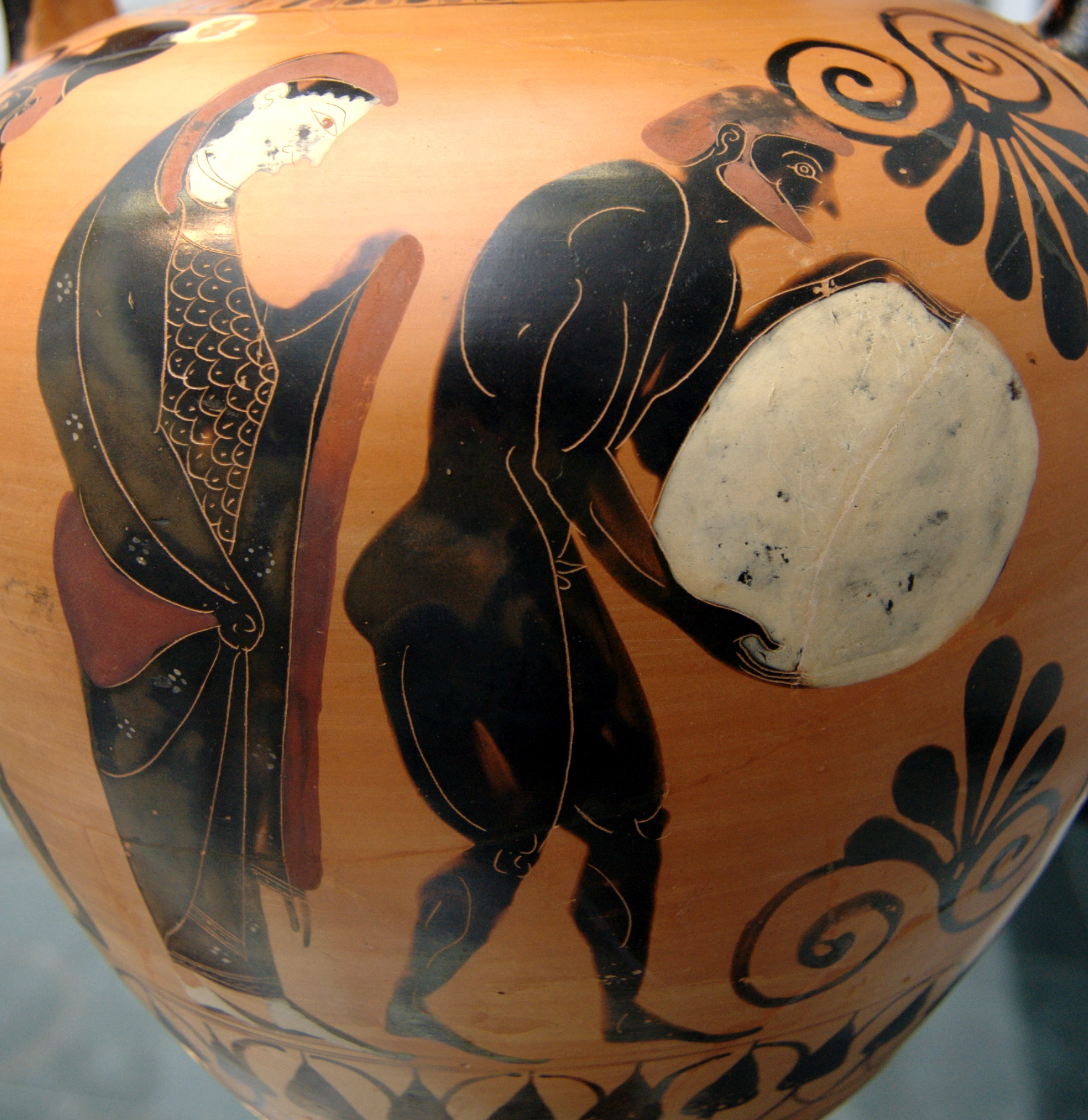
Persephone supervising Sisyphus in the underworld, Attic black-figure amphora, c. 530 BC

In Greek mythology, Tartarus (/ˈtɑːrtərəs/; Ancient Greek: Τάρταρος, romanized: Tártaros) is the deep abyss that is used as a dungeon of torment and suffering for the wicked and as the prison for the Titans. Tartarus is the place where, according to Plato's Gorgias (c. 400 BC), souls are judged after death and where the wicked received divine punishment. Tartarus appears in early Greek cosmology, such as in Hesiod's Theogony, where the personified Tartarus is described as one of the earliest beings to exist, alongside Chaos and Gaia (Earth).

== Greek mythology ==
In Greek mythology, Tartarus is both a deity and a place in the underworld.

=== As a deity ===
In the Greek poet Hesiod's Theogony (c. late 8th century BC), Tartarus was the third of the primordial deities, following after Chaos and Gaia (Earth), and preceding Eros, and was the father, by Gaia, of the monster Typhon. According to Hyginus, Tartarus was the offspring of Aether and Gaia.

=== As a location ===
Hesiod asserts that a bronze anvil falling from heaven would fall nine days before it reached the earth. The anvil would take nine more days to fall from earth to Tartarus. In the Iliad (c. 8th century BC), Zeus asserts that Tartarus is "as far beneath Hades as heaven is above earth." Similarly the mythographer Apollodorus, describes Tartarus as "a gloomy place in Hades as far distant from earth as earth is distant from the sky."

While the realm of Hades is the realm of the dead in Greek mythology, Tartarus also has a number of inhabitants. When Cronus came to power as ruler of the Titans, he imprisoned the three ancient one-eyed Cyclopes and the hundred-armed Hecatoncheires in Tartarus and appointed the monster Campe as their guard. Campe was part scorpion and had a ring of animal heads around her waist that snapped at anyone who dared to approach. She also carried a whip with which she tortured the Cyclopes and Hecatoncheires. Zeus killed Campe and released the imprisoned giants to aid him in his war against the Titans. The Olympian gods eventually triumphed. Cronus and many other Titans were banished to Tartarus, although Prometheus, Epimetheus, and female Titans such as Metis were spared. Other gods could also be sentenced to Tartarus. In the Homeric Hymn to Hermes, Apollo threatens to cast Hermes into Tartarus. Apollo himself was nearly condemned to Tartarus by Zeus for killing the Cyclopes. The Hecatoncheires subsequently became the guardians of Tartarus's prisoners. Later, after Zeus defeated the monster Typhon, he cast him into "wide Tartarus".

==== Residents ====
Originally, Tartarus was used only to confine dangers to the gods of Olympus and their predecessors. In later mythologies, Tartarus became a space dedicated to the imprisonment and torment of mortals who had sinned against the gods, and each punishment was unique to the condemned. For example:

- King Sisyphus was sent to Tartarus for killing guests and travelers at his castle in violation of his hospitality, seducing his niece, and reporting one of Zeus's sexual conquests by telling the river god Asopus of the whereabouts of his daughter Aegina (who had been taken away by Zeus). But regardless of the impropriety of Zeus's frequent conquests, Sisyphus overstepped his bounds by considering himself a peer of the gods who could rightfully report their indiscretions. When Zeus ordered Thanatos to chain up Sisyphus in Tartarus, Sisyphus tricked Thanatos by asking him how the chains worked and ended up chaining Thanatos; as a result there was no more death. This caused Ares to free Thanatos and turn Sisyphus over to him. Sometime later, Sisyphus had Persephone send him back to the surface to scold his wife for not burying him properly. Sisyphus was forcefully dragged back to Tartarus by Hermes when he refused to go back to the underworld after that. In Tartarus, Sisyphus was forced forever to try to roll a large boulder to the top of a mountain slope, which, no matter how many times he nearly succeeded in his attempt, would always roll back to the bottom. This constituted the punishment (fitting the crime) of Sisyphus for daring to claim that his cleverness surpassed that of Zeus. Zeus's cunning punishment demonstrated quite the opposite to be the case, condemning Sisyphus to a humiliating eternity of futility and frustration.
- King Tantalus also ended up in Tartarus after he cut up his son Pelops, boiled him, and served him as food when he was invited to dine with the gods. He also stole the ambrosia from the Gods and told his people its secrets. Another story mentioned that he held onto a golden dog forged by Hephaestus and stolen by Tantalus's friend Pandareus. Tantalus held onto the golden dog for safekeeping and later denied to Pandareus that he had it. Tantalus's punishment for his actions (now a proverbial term for "temptation without satisfaction") was to stand in a pool of water beneath a fruit tree with low branches. Whenever he reached for the fruit, the branches raised his intended meal from his grasp. Whenever he bent down to get a drink, the water receded before he could get any. Over his head towered a threatening stone like that of Sisyphus.
- Ixion was the king of the Lapiths, the most ancient tribe of Thessaly. Ixion grew to hate his father-in-law and ended up pushing him onto a bed of coal and wood, committing the first kin-related murder. The princes of other lands ordered that Ixion be denied the cleansing of his sin. Zeus took pity on Ixion and invited him to a meal on Olympus. But when Ixion saw Hera, he fell in love with her and did some under-the-table caressing until Zeus signaled him to stop. After finding a place for Ixion to sleep, Zeus created a cloud-clone of Hera named Nephele to test him to see how far he would go to seduce Hera. Ixion had sex with her, which resulted in the birth of Centaurus, who mated with some Magnesian mares on Mount Pelion and thus begot the race of Centaurs (who are called the Ixionidae from their descent). Zeus drove Ixion from Mount Olympus and then struck him with a thunderbolt. He was punished by being tied to a winged flaming wheel that was always spinning: first in the sky and then in Tartarus. Only when Orpheus came down to the underworld to rescue Eurydice did it stop spinning because of the music Orpheus was playing. Ixion's being strapped to the flaming wheel represented his burning lust.
- In some versions, the Danaïdes murdered their husbands and were punished in Tartarus by being forced to carry water in a jug to fill a bath which would thereby wash off their sins. But the jugs were filled with cracks, so the water always leaked out.
- The giant Tityos attempted to rape Leto on Hera's orders, but was slain by Apollo and Artemis. As punishment, Tityos was stretched out in Tartarus and tortured by two vultures who fed on his liver. This punishment is extremely similar to that of the Titan Prometheus.
- King Salmoneus was also mentioned to have been imprisoned in Tartarus after passing himself off as Zeus, causing the real Zeus to smite him with a thunderbolt.
- Arke is the sister of Iris who sided with the Titans as their messenger goddess. Zeus removed her wings following the gods' victory over the Titans and she was thrown into Tartarus with the Titans.
- Ocnus was condemned in Tartarus perpetually to weave a rope of straw which, as fast as he weaves it, is just as quickly eaten by a donkey. There is no mention of what he did to deserve this fate.
- When his pregnant daughter Coronis was killed by either Artemis or Apollo, King Phlegyas set fire to the Apollonian temple at Delphi and was killed by Apollo. He was punished in Tartarus by being entombed in a rock and starved in front of an eternal feast as he shouts to the other inhabitants not to despise the gods.

According to Plato (c. 427 BC), Rhadamanthus, Aeacus and Minos were the judges of the dead and chose who went to Tartarus. Rhadamanthus judged Asian souls, Aeacus judged European souls and Minos was the deciding vote and judge of the Greek. Souls regarded as unjust or perjured would go to Tartarus. Those who committed crimes seen as curable would be purified there, while those who committed crimes seen as uncurable would be eternally damned, and demonstrate a warning example for the living. In Gorgias, Plato writes about Socrates telling Callicles, who believes might makes right, that doing injustice to others is worse than suffering injustice, and most uncurable inhabitants of Tartarus were tyrants whose might gave them the opportunity to commit huge crimes. Archelaus I of Macedon is mentioned as a possible example of this, while Thersites is said to be curable, because of his lack of might. According to Plato's Phaedo, the uncurable consisted of temple robbers and murderers, while sons who killed one of their parents during a status of rage but regretted this their whole life, and involuntary manslaughterers, would be taken out of Tartarus after one year, so they could ask their victims for forgiveness. If they should be forgiven, they were liberated, but if not, would go back and stay there until they were finally pardoned. In the Republic, Plato mentions the Myth of Er, who is said to have been a fallen soldier who resurrected from the dead, and saw their realm. According to this, the length of a punishment an adult receives for each crime in Tartarus, who is responsible for a lot of deaths, betrayed states or armies and sold them into slavery or had been involved in similar misdeeds, corresponds to ten times out of a hundred earthly years (while good deeds would be rewarded in equal measure).

There were a number of entrances to Tartarus in Greek mythology. One was in Aornum.

== Roman mythology ==
In Roman mythology, evildoers are sent to Tartarus for punishment after death. Virgil describes Tartarus in great detail within the Aeneid, Book VI. At the foot of a cliff, fortified by walls, flows a raging river of fire named Phlegethon. At the entrance-hall, a hydra with fifty black, gaping jaws sits atop a gate that screeches when opened. It contains a pit inside extending down into the earth twice as far as the distance from the lands of the living to Olympus. The twin sons of the Titan Aloeus were said to be imprisoned at the bottom of this crevice.

== Biblical pseudepigrapha ==
Tartarus occurs in the Septuagint translation of Job (40:20 and 41:24) and Proverbs (30:16) into Koine Greek, and in Hellenistic Jewish literature from the Greek text of the Book of Enoch, dated to 400–200 BC. This states that God placed the archangel Uriel "in charge of the world and of Tartarus" (20:2). Tartarus is generally understood to be the place where 200 fallen Watchers (angels) are imprisoned. The fallen angels being bound in fiery pits and the abyss is also alluded to in other parts of Enoch (10:4–6, 18:11–16 and 21:7–10), and 5 Jubilees (6–10) where they are similarly imprisoned in the depths of the earth.

Reference to the Watchers of the book of Enoch is also observed in Jude 1:6–7 where scripture describes Angels being bound by chains under everlasting darkness, and 2 Peter 2:4 which further describes fallen angels committed to chains in Tartarus.

In Hypostasis of the Archons (also translated 'Reality of the Rulers'), an apocryphal gnostic treatise dated before 350 AD, Tartarus makes a brief appearance when Zōē (life), the daughter of Sophia (wisdom) casts Ialdabaōth (demiurge) down to the bottom of the abyss of Tartarus.

In The Book of Thomas, Tartaros is claimed by Jesus to be the place where those who hear the word of Judas Thomas and "turn away or sneer" are to be sent. These damned will be handed over to the angel or power Tartarouchos.

Others include the Sibylline Oracles (II.303-310), which mentions the angel Tartarouchos ("keeper of Tartarus"). Testament of Solomon (26), where Beelzebub claims he was the first angel, but now reigns over those bound in Tartarus. As well as the Gospel of Nicodemus (4:2), where Satan is described as the "prince of Tartarus".

== New Testament ==
In the New Testament, the noun Tartarus does not occur but tartaroō (ταρταρόω, "throw to Tartarus"), a shortened form of the classical Greek verb kata-tartaroō ("throw down to Tartarus"), does appear in 2 Peter 2:4. Liddell–Scott provides other sources for the shortened form of this verb, including Acusilaus (5th century BC), Joannes Laurentius Lydus (4th century AD) and the Scholiast on Aeschylus's Eumenides, who cites Pindar relating how the earth tried to tartaro "cast down" Apollo after he overcame the Python. In classical texts, the longer form kata-tartaroo is often related to the throwing of the Titans down to Tartarus.

The English Standard Version is one of several English versions that gives the Greek reading Tartarus as a footnote:

For if God did not spare angels when they sinned, but cast them into hell(a) and committed them to chains(b) of gloomy darkness to be kept until the judgment;

— 2 Peter 2:4 (Footnote a: Greek Tartarus)

Adam Clarke reasoned that Peter's use of language relating to the Titans was an indication that the ancient Greeks had heard of a Biblical punishment of fallen angels. Some Evangelical Christian commentaries distinguish Tartarus as a place for wicked angels and Gehenna as a place for wicked humans on the basis of this verse. Other Evangelical commentaries, in reconciling that some fallen angels are chained in Tartarus, yet some not, attempt to distinguish between one type of fallen angel and another.

Within the Judeo-Christian conceptions of Tartarus, they maintained the Greek mythological imagery, including its location physically beneath the earth, a dark place with prisoners in chains, and its inhabitants having been "thrust down".

== See also ==
- Charon
- Duat
- Erebus
- Greek mythology in popular culture
- Hell
- Lake of fire
- Underworld
- Orcus
- Sheol
- Tartaruchi
- The Golden Bough (mythology)
- Tzoah Rotachat
