= Tartaruga =

Tartaruga may refer to:

== Biology ==
The term Tartaruga is a word in Italian, Portuguese and Galician that may refer to:

- Testudines, including:
  - Turtle, an aquatic reptile
  - Tortoise, a land-dwelling reptile

== Places ==
- Praia da Tartaruga / Tartaruga Beach in Rio das Ostras
- Tartarugas River, a river on the Brazilian island Marajó

== Other ==
- Saurer Tartaruga, a swiss armored personnel carrier
- Tartaruga, nickname for FS Class E.444 locomotives
