= Jan Pieter Nicolaas Land =

Dutch philosopher and orientalist (1834–1897)

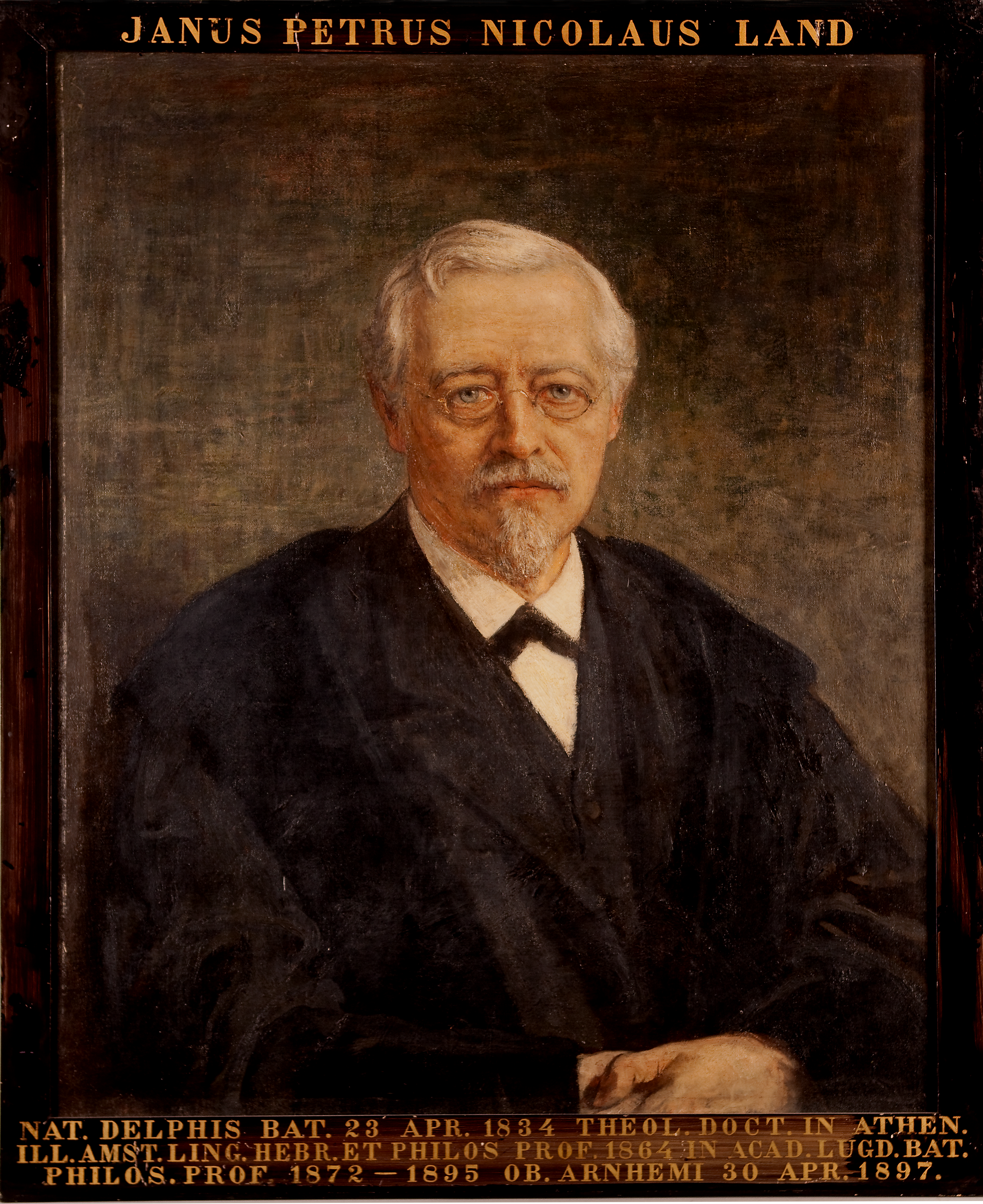
- Born: April 23, 1834; Delft, Netherlands
- Died: April 30, 1897 (aged 63); Arnhem, Netherlands

Education
- Education: University of Leiden

Philosophical work
- Era: 19th-century philosophy
- Region: Western philosophy
- Main interests: Philosophy, Oriental studies, Semitic languages, musicology

Jan Pieter Nicolaas Land (23 April 1834 – 30 April 1897) was a Dutch philosopher, orientalist, linguist and musicologist. He served as professor of philosophy at Leiden University and was known for his work on Syriac literature, early modern philosophy, and the history of music.

== Early life and education ==
Land was born in Delft in 1834 to Axel Lourents Land of Norwegian descent and Catharina Elisabeth Hulsbeek. After his father’s early death, the family relocated several times in the northern Netherlands. He received part of his education at a Moravian school in Neuwied (Germany) and later attended the gymnasium in Leeuwarden.

In 1850 he enrolled at the University of Leiden, where he studied theology and philosophy. He earned his doctorate in theology in 1857 with a dissertation on the Blessing of Jacob in Genesis 49.

== Academic career ==
Following his doctorate, Land was commissioned by the Leiden University Library to examine Syriac manuscripts at the British Museum in London. This research formed the basis of his major editorial project Anecdota Syriaca, published between 1862 and 1875.

From 1859 to 1864 he served as general secretary of the Nederlandsch Bijbelgenootschap. In 1864 he was appointed professor of Oriental languages and philosophy at the Athenaeum Illustre in Amsterdam. In 1872 he accepted a chair in philosophy at Leiden University, where he taught until illness forced his retirement in 1895.

== Scholarly work ==
Land’s scholarly output covered Oriental philology, philosophy, and musicology. His Anecdota Syriaca made a substantial number of previously unpublished Syriac texts accessible to Western scholarship and remained influential well into the 20th century.

In philosophy, Land focused on logic, epistemology, and the history of early modern thought. Together with Johannes van Vloten, he prepared a critical edition of the works of Baruch Spinoza (1882–1883). He also edited and studied the writings of Arnold Geulincx, contributing to renewed scholarly interest in Dutch Cartesianism.

Land was also active as a musicologist, publishing on early European music and engaging with non-Western musical traditions, notably Javanese gamelan. He played an important role in the Maatschappij tot Bevordering der Toonkunst. He wrote English almost as easily as Dutch; but he also used German and French without much difficulty.

== Personal life ==
In 1870 Land married Wilhelmina Cremer. The couple had two children, one of whom died in infancy. In 1895 Land suffered a severe stroke that ended his academic career. He died in Arnhem in 1897.

== Legacy ==
Land is remembered as a polymathic figure in 19th-century Dutch scholarship. His work bridged philosophy, Oriental studies, and musicology, and his editions of Syriac and philosophical texts continue to be cited in modern academic literature.

== Selected works ==
- Dissertatio theologica de carmine Jacobi (1857)
- Anecdota Syriaca (4 vols., 1862–1875)
- Inleiding tot de wijsbegeerte (1889)
- Opera posthuma Spinozae (with J. van Vloten, 1882–1883)
