= Hugo Duensing =

German scholar of early Christianity

Hugo Berthold Heinrich Duensing (15 April 1877–28 November 1961) was a German scholar of early Christianity and a Lutheran pastor. He specialized in Eastern Christianity and oriental studies, including documents in Ethiopian; Syriac and Aramaic; and Arabic.

== Biography ==
Hugo Duensing was born in Hanover, then part of the German Empire, on 15 April 1877 to his parents Friedrich and Henriette. In Hanover, he attended the Kaiser Wilhelm Gymnasium. In 1896, he attended the University of Greifswald, where he studied theology and the Arabic and Ethiopian languages. He traveled to Berlin and later to the Georg August University of Göttingen where he completed his studies under Julius Wellhausen. On August 6, 1906, he acquired a degree in theology from Göttingen. He was ordained a pastor in 1907, and served from 1907 to 1909 in Bad Rehburg; from 1909 to 1926 in Dassensen-Wellersen; and from 1926 until his retirement in 1947 in Goslar at the Market Church St. Cosmas and Damian. In April 1909, he married Anna Schürer, the daughter of the famous historian Emil Schürer. The couple would have five children together: Friedrich, Ernst, Reinhard, Hildegard, and Gertrud. Duensing suffered from occasional spates of ill health and exhaustion, and committed himself to a sanitarium for rest in 1905, 1914, 1920, 1928, and 1936.

From January to May 1914, Duensing visited Jerusalem (then under control of the Ottoman Empire) and took pictures of manuscripts held by the Greek Orthodox Patriarchate of Jerusalem which would be used by the Göttingen Septuagint Company. Some of these photographs would be used to help make Alfred Rahlfs' edition of the Septuagint. While he never achieved a faculty position, he remained an active scholar, especially in the field of Ethiopian studies. He was given an honorary doctorate by the Theology Faculty of the University of Göttingen in 1951.

Duensing died on 28 November 1961.

== Selected works ==
- Liefert das äthiopische Synaxar Materialien zur Geschichte Abessiniens? Für den zweiten, die Monate Magābīt bis Pāguemēn enthaltenden Teil des Synaxars untersucht. Göttingen 1900, OCLC 612943430.
- Christlich – palästinisch – aramäische Texte und Fragmente nebst einer Abhandlung über den Wert der palästinischen Septuaginta. Göttingen 1906, OCLC 250532178. (Contained documents on the Codex Sinaiticus Rescriptus, among others)
- Epistula apostolorum. Nach dem äthiopischen und koptischen Texte. Bonn 1925, OCLC 1158120381. (On the Epistula Apostolorum)
- Zwei christlich-palästinisch-aramäische Fragmente aus der Apostelgeschichte, Zeitschrift für die neutestamentliche Wissenschaft 37, 1938. (Contained documents on Codex Climaci Rescriptus, among others)
- Verzeichnis der Personen- und der geographischen Namen in der Mischna. Auf Grund der von Emil Schürer hinterlassenen einschlägigen Materialien. Stuttgart 1960, OCLC 797702040. (A work on the Mishnah based on old papers from his father-in-law Emil Schürer)
