= Tamás Adamik =

Hungarian philologist (born 1937)

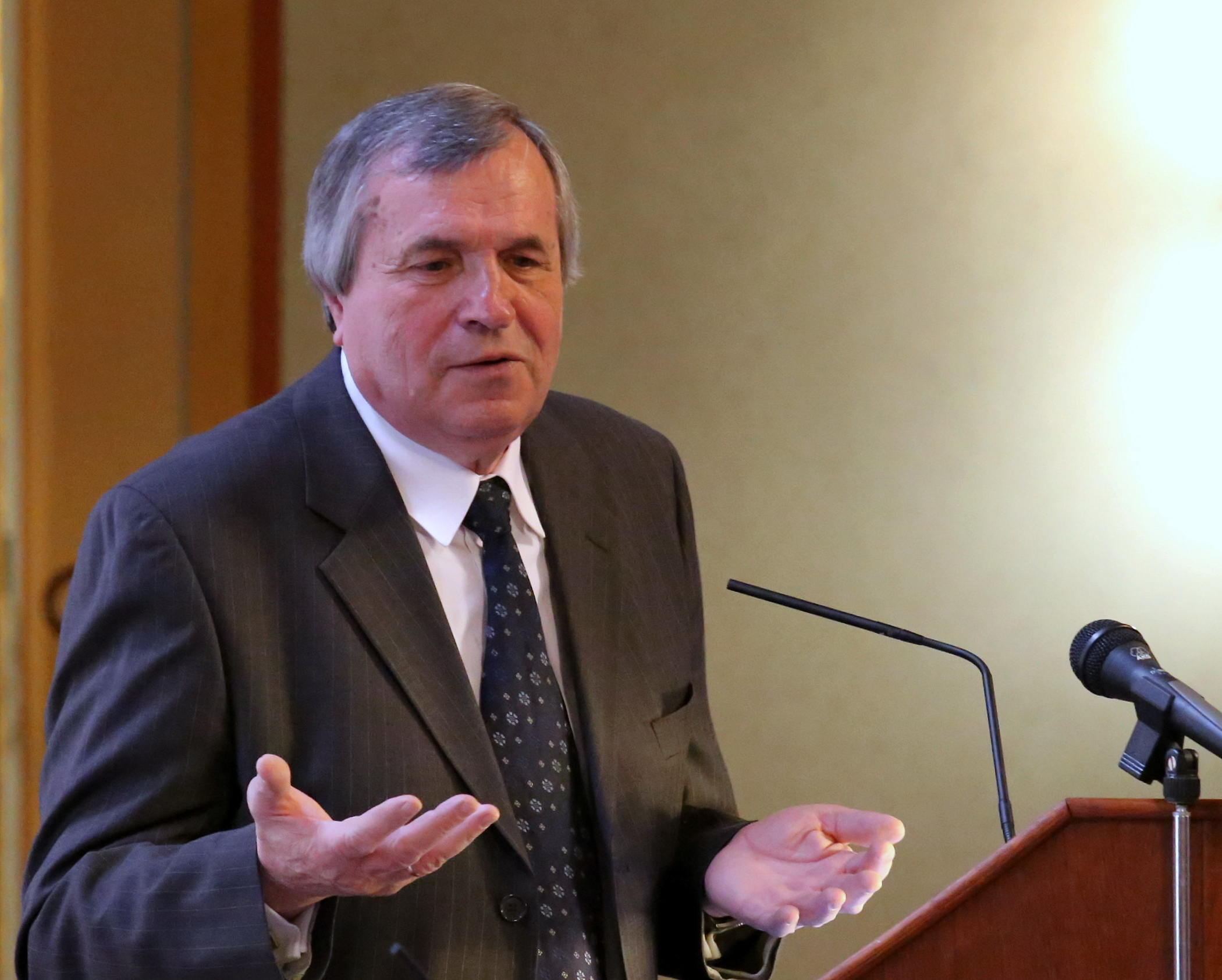
Tamás Adamik in 2013

Tamás Adamik (born August 6, 1937) is a Hungarian classical philologist and linguist, literary historian, and translator. He joined Eötvös Loránd University in Budapest as a professor in 1973, where he worked in its Latin department until he took emeritus status in 2002. Adamik's areas of research focus have included Roman literature in Latin, Vulgar Latin, and Koine Greek; as well as early Christian literature.

== Biography ==
Tamás Adamik was born in 1937 in Kecskemét in the Kingdom of Hungary. He attended a high school run by the Piarists in Kecskemét. He showed an early interest in languages, with his areas of special focus being Latin and Russian. He was so impressed by the Piarists that he considered joining the order as a monk, and studied theology with them for four years, but decided that giving up marriage would be a mistake. He left the Piarists and attended Eötvös Loránd University (ELTE) where he studied Latin and Russian further, graduating with a dual major in both. He earned a master's degree in 1966, and defended his doctoral dissertation in 1967.

He worked as a translator and editor of textbooks after university. Due to political pressures to gain a credential in something Marxism-related, Adamik applied for a correspondence postgraduate course where he could both fulfill his interest in languages but also get any Marxist philosophy requirements out of the way. Slavic languages was not offered as a correspondence course that year, ruling out Russian, but classical philology was, so he took that. The course rekindled his love of Latin and the classical world, and he received an invitation to join the Latin department of Eötvös Loránd University in 1973, initially as an adjunct, but quickly becoming an assistant professor.

In the academic year 1990–1991, he taught as a distinguished visiting professor at Millersville University in Lancaster County, Pennsylvania. From 1991 to 2002, he served as the head professor of the Latin department of ELTE. He took emeritus status in 2002.

Adamik's wife, Anna Adamikné Jászó, is also a linguist and university professor. The couple has 4 children together.

In 1982, he received a prize for his translation of Aristotle's Rhetoric, and in 1984, a prize for his monograph on Martial, Martialis és költészete. He was awarded the Commander's Cross of the civilian branch of the Hungarian Order of Merit in 2012.

== Selected works ==
- A korszerű orosznyelv-oktatásért. Az I. Országos Orosznyelv-oktatási Konferencia anyaga; szerk. Adamik Tamás; Tankönyvkiadó, Budapest, 1968
- Móritz György–Csengery Zoltánné: Olasz nyelvkönyv. A gimnáziumok IV. osztálya számára; szerk. Adamik Tamás; Tankönyvkiadó, Budapest, 1968
- Móritz György: Olasz társalgás; szerk. Adamik Tamás; Tankönyvkiadó, Budapest, 1969 (Tanuljunk nyelveket!)
- Hlavács József–Rhédey Györgyné: Orosz nyelvkönyv 6. Az általános iskola 6. osztálya számára; szerk. Adamik Tamás; Tankönyvkiadó, Budapest, 1971
- Catullus versei. Catulli Veronensis liber (egyetemi tankönyv, kritikai kiadás); sajtó alá rend., jegyz. Adamik Tamás; Tankönyvkiadó, Budapest, 1971 (Auctores Latini, 15.)
- Herczeg Gyula, Kotzián Tamás: Képes olasz nyelvkönyv gyermekeknek 1.; szerk. Miseje Attiláné, Adamik Tamás; Tankönyvkiadó, Budapest, 1972
- Tanári kézikönyv az orosz nyelv tanításához a 6. osztályban; Tankönyvkiadó, Budapest, 1972
- Kosaras István: Orosz nyelvtan. A középiskolák számára; szerk. Adamik Tamás; Tankönyvkiadó, Budapest, 1972
- Banó István–Nagy Ferenc–Waczulik Margit: Latin nyelvkönyv; szerk. Adamik Tamás; Tankönyvkiadó, Budapest, 1973 (Tanuljunk nyelveket!)
- Latin költészet. Kézirat gyanánt; szerk. Adamik Tamás, B. Révész Mária; ELTE, Budapest, 1974 (Klasszika-filológiai tanulmányok, 1.)
- Latin prózaírók; szerk. Adamik Tamás, B. Révész Mária; ELTE, Budapest, 1976 (Klasszika-filológiai tanulmányok, 2.)
- Martialis és költészete; Akadémiai, Budapest, 1979 (Apollo könyvtár, 10.)
- Vergilius: Aeneis I-VI. (egyetemi segédkönyv); szöveggond. Adamik Tamás, bev. Adamik Tamás, Bollók János, jegyz. Adamik Tamás, B. Révész Mária, Bollók János; Tankönyvkiadó, Budapest, 1987 (Auctores Latini, 21.)
- Ammianus Marcellinus: Róma története; ford. Szepesy Gyula, jegyz., utószó Adamik Tamás; Európa, Budapest, 1993
- Római irodalom az archaikus korban; Seneca, Pécs, 1993 (Seneca könyvek)
- Római irodalom az aranykorban; Seneca, Pécs, 1994 (Seneca könyvek)
- Római irodalom az ezüstkorban; Seneca, Pécs, 1994
- N. Horváth Margit–Nagy Ferenc: Latin nyelvkönyv I.; szerk. Adamik Tamás; Nemzeti Tankönyvkiadó, Budapest, 1995
- Római irodalom a késő császárkorban; Seneca, Budapest, 1996 Pécs (Seneca könyvek)
- Catullus versei. Catulli Veronensis liber; 3. jav. kiad.; szöveggond., bev., jegyz. Adamik Tamás; Nemzeti Tankönyvkiadó, Budapest, 1998 (Auctores Latini, 15.)
- Antik stíluselméletek Gorgiastól Augustinusig. Stílus, kritika, értelmezés; Seneca, Budapest, 1998 (Seneca könyvek)
- Vergilius: Aeneis I-VI.; 2. jav. kiad.; szöveggond. Adamik Tamás, bev. Adamik Tamás, Bollók János, jegyz. Adamik Tamás, B. Révész Mária, Bollók János; Nemzeti Tankönyvkiadó, Budapest, 2001 (Auctores Latini, 21.)
- Hajdu Péter: Claudius Claudianus eposzai; szerk. Adamik Tamás, Eperjessy László; Argumentum, Budapest, 2002 (Apollo Könyvtár, 23.)
- Harmatta János–Rimóczi-Hamar Márta: Horatius, Vergilius és Maecenas. Barátság és hűség Augusztus Rómájában; szerk. Adamik Tamás, Borzsák István; Akadémiai, Budapest, 2003 (Apollo Könyvtár, 20.)
- Adamik Tamás–Aczél Petra–A. Jászó Anna: Retorika; Osiris, Budapest, 2004 (Osiris tankönyvek)
- József Attila: Medáliák című ciklusának szerkezete. Elhangzott a Szent István Társulat régi székházának dísztermében 2005. március 4-én; Szent István Akadémia, Budapest, 2006 (A Szent István Tudományos Akadémia székfoglaló előadásai)
- Római irodalom. A kezdetektől a Nyugatrómai Birodalom bukásáig; Kalligram, Pozsony, 2009
- Retorikai lexikon; szerk. Adamik Tamás, A. Jászó Anna; Kalligram, Pozsony, 2010
- Cicero összes retorikaelméleti művei; szerk. Adamik Tamás; ford. Adamik Tamás, Csehy Zoltán, Gonda Attila, Kisdi Klára, Krupp József, Mezei Mónika, Polgár Anikó, Simon L. Zoltán; Kalligram, Pozsony, 2012
- Sanctissima religio. Vallás- és irodalomtudományi tanulmányok; Szent István Társulat, Budapest, 2012
- Miért írunk verset? Költői est négyesben; Adamik Tamás, Baka Györgyi, B. Tóth Klára, Deák-Sárosi László; Üveghegy, Százhalombatta, 2013
- Latin irodalom a kora középkorban: 6–8. század. Budapest: Kalligram. 2014. ISBN 978-80-8101-821-3
- Irodalmi karácsony. Adamik Tamás, Baka Györgyi, B. Tóth Klára, Deák-Sárosi László és Kasó Tibor szakrális és karácsonyi versei; Üveghegy, Százhalombatta, 2016
- Latin irodalom a Karoling-korban: 8–9. század. Budapest: Kalligram. 2017. ISBN 978-963-468-001-7
- Carmina Rustica. Versek és műfordítások; Üveghegy, Százhalombatta, 2018
- Latin irodalom az átmeneti korban, 9-11. sz. A keresztény Európa kiteljesedése; Kalligram, Budapest, 2020. ISBN 9789634681793
- Latin irodalom az érett középkorban, 12-13. század. A keresztény Európa virágkora; Pest Kalligram, Budapest, 2022
- Carmina Fructifera. Versek és műfordítások; Üveghegy, Százhalombatta, 2023

=== Translations ===
- Aristotle: Rétorika; ford., jegyz., utószó Adamik Tamás; Gondolat, Budapest, 1982
- Lactantius: Az isteni gondviselésről. A keresztényüldözők halála. Isten művei. Isten haragja; ford., jegyz., utószó Adamik Tamás; Helikon, Budapest, 1985 (Prométheusz könyvek, 6.)
- Cornificius: A C. Herenniusnak ajánlott rétorika. Latinul és magyarul / Cornifici Rhetorica ad C. Herennium; ford., bev., jegyz. Adamik Tamás; Akadémiai, Budapest, 1987 (Görög és latin írók, 18.)
- Jerome (Hieronymus): "Nehéz az emberi léleknek nem szeretni". A keresztény életről, irodalomról és tudományról; ford., jegyz., utószó Adamik Tamás; Helikon, Budapest, 1991 (Harmonia mundi könyvek)
- A szofista filozófia. Szöveggyűjtemény; összeáll., utószó Steiger Kornél, ford. Adamik Tamás et al.; Atlantisz, Budapest, 1993 (A kútnál)
- Az apostolok csodálatos cselekedetei; ford. Adamik Tamás et al., szerk. Dörömbözi János, utószó Adamik Tamás; Telosz, Budapest, 1996 (Apokrif iratok)
- Csodás evangéliumok; ford. Adamik Tamás et al.; vál., utószó Adamik Tamás, szerk. Dörömbözi János; Telosz, Budapest, 1996 (Apokrif iratok)
- Apokalipszisek; szerk. Dörömbözi János, vál., utószó Adamik Tamás, ford. Adamik Tamás et al.; Telosz, Budapest, 1997 (Apokrif iratok)
- Apokrif levelek; ford. Adamik Tamás et al., vál., utószó Adamik Tamás, szerk. Dörömbözi János; Telosz, Budapest, 1999 (Apokrif iratok)
- Martial: Válogatott epigrammák. Electa epigrammata; ford. Adamik Tamás et al., vál., szerk., jegyz., utószó Adamik Tamás; Magyar Könyvklub, Budapest, 2001 (Írók, költők, gondolkodók)
- Quintus Cornificius: A szónoki mesterség. A C. Herenniusnak ajánlott retorika; ford., utószó, jegyz. Adamik Tamás; Magyar Könyvklub, Budapest, 2001
- Lysias beszédei; ford. Adamik Tamás, Agócs Péter, Horváth László, Ittzés Máté; Osiris–Balassi, Budapest, 2003 (Sapientia Humana)
- Ioannes Saresberiensis (John of Salisbury): Metalogicon; ford., jegyz. Adamik Tamás; Szent István Társulat, Budapest, 2003 (Középkori keresztény írók, 4.)
- Jerome: Levelek; szerk. Takács László, ford. Adamik Tamás, Puskely Mária, Takács László; Szenzár, Budapest, 2005
- Quintilianus: Szónoklattan; szerk., jegyz. Adamik Tamás, ford. Adamik Tamás, Csehy Zoltán, Gonda Attila, Kopeczky Rita, Krupp József, Polgár Anikó, Simon L. Zoltán, Tordai Éva; Kalligram, Pozsony, 2008
