= Christian Aramaic =

Christian Aramaic may refer to:

- Syriac language
- Christian Palestinian Aramaic
