= Syro-Palestinian =

Syro-Palestinian or Syropalestinian may refer to several things:

- for the region sometimes called Syro-Palestine, see Levant
- for the archaeological field sometimes called Syro-Palestinian, see Levantine archaeology
- for the ancient language sometimes called Syro-Palestinian Aramaic, see Christian Palestinian Aramaic
- for the modern language sometimes called Syro-Palestinian or Syro-Palestinian Arabic, see Levantine Arabic
