= Christian Palestinian Aramaic =

Melkite Aramaic

- CPA in uncial script: underwriting of Matthew 26:72–27:2 in a palimpsest
- Region: Palestine, Transjordan, Sinai
- Era: ca. 400–1200 AD
- Language family: Afro-Asiatic: Semitic; Central; Northwest Semitic; Aramaic; Western Aramaic; Palestinian Aramaic; Christian Palestinian Aramaic
- Early forms: Proto-Afroasiatic: Proto-Semitic; Old Aramaic; Middle Aramaic; Western Middle Aramaic
- Writing system: Christian Palestinian Aramaic Alphabet

Language codes
- ISO 639-3: None (mis)
- Glottolog: chri1239

Christian Palestinian Aramaic was a Western Aramaic dialect that began as a vernacular between the first and third centuries CE, and emerged as a written language used by the Melkite Christian community in Palestine, Transjordan and Sinai between the fifth and thirteenth centuries. (Note: This period may be described as Middle Aramaic or Late Aramaic.) It is preserved in inscriptions, manuscripts (mostly palimpsests, less papyri in the first period) and amulets.

All the medieval Western Aramaic dialects are defined by religious community. CPA is closely related to its counterparts, Jewish Palestinian Aramaic (JPA) and Samaritan Aramaic (SA), but distinguished by its lack of direct borrowing from Hebrew and incorporation of Greek syntax, as well as Old Arabic substrate influence. CPA shows a specific vocabulary that is often not paralleled in the adjacent Western Aramaic dialects.

== Name ==
No primary source contemporary with its use gives CPA a name as a distinct dialect or language. According to Barhebraeus writing in the 13th century, "the people of Damascus and of the mountains of Lebanon and of the rest of Inner Syria" spoke an Aramaic dialect he called al-falasṭīniyya ("the Palestinian") between the 1st and 3rd centuries CE. Inscriptions in that area during that time period are classified mostly as Haurani Aramaic and Nabataean Aramaic, and in the 6th century those inscribed in stone are mostly in Greek, though there are several Syriac manuscripts produced by monasteries associated with the Ghassanids.

Modern scholarship uses names like "Palestinian Syriac" and "Syro-Palestinian Aramaic" because of the modified Syriac Esṭrangēlā script in which CPA texts are written. Another cause for the association of CPA with Syriac is the fact that in later Rabbinic literature, the term "Syriac" was often used to describe Aramaic in general. Egeria, in the account of her pilgrimage to Palestine at the end of the 4th century, refers to Syriac, which was probably what is now Christian Palestinian Aramaic.

The term syrica Hierosolymitana ("Jerusalemite Syriac") was introduced by Johann David Michaelis based on the appearance of the Arabic name of Jerusalem, al-Quds, (Note: This itself was a correction of adquds by the editors Assemani.) in the colophon of a Gospel lectionary of 1030 AD (today Vat. sir. 19). It was also used in the first edition by Franciscus Miniscalchi Erizzo.

The terms "Christian Palestinian Aramaic" and "Melkite Aramaic" (Note: The term "Melkite Aramaic" was coined by Alain Desreumaux.) refer to the Christian group in Palestine deploying this dialect for their written sources.

== History ==
CPA emerged as a written language in Melkite Christian communities in the Byzantine provinces of Palaestina Prima, Palaestina Secunda, and Arabia Petraea (Palaestina Salutaris) around the fifth century, and possibly in the fourth. It existed as a vernacular prior to being written, alongside several other related Western Aramaic dialects, part of a continuum of Late Antiquity Aramaic, used from Palestine to Mesopotamia for daily speech in the region.

It appears to have developed as a written form to convey religious ideas and texts that were more transcribed in Greek (and Syriac) to the common people in the language of their daily life, so it could be more accessible to them. Its emergence coincides with the increasing Christianization of Arabic-speaking populations in the fourth and fifth centuries, in the Negev (such as the Nabataeans), and particularly in the Northern Jordanian highlands, where this was accompanied by a sedentarization process. The intermingling between these Arabic-speaking and Aramaic-speaking Christianized populations and the lack of widespread fluency in Greek spawned the need for a popular literary form to bring the liturgy to the people.

CPA is preserved in inscriptions, manuscripts, mostly palimpsests in the early period, and amulets. The history of CPA writing can be divided into three periods: early (5th–7th/8th centuries), middle (8th–9th) and late (10th–13th). The existence of a middle period has only recently been suggested.

Only inscriptions, fragmentary manuscripts and the underwriting of palimpsests survive from the early period. Of the inscriptions, only one can be dated with any precision. The fragments are both Biblical and Patristic. The oldest complete (non-fragmentary) manuscript dates to 1030. All the complete manuscripts are liturgical in nature.

CPA declined as a spoken language because of a gradual language shift and increased Arabization following the early Muslim conquests. Its use as a spoken language, among many other Western Aramaic dialects, was in a diglossic context, whereby it was the vernacular used, with Greek employed primarily for writing, and the vernacular gradually gave way to the continuum of Levantine Arabic dialects. From the tenth century onwards it was mainly a liturgical language in the Melkite churches, with the Melkite community mostly speaking Arabic. Even as a written language, it went extinct around the fourteenth century and was only identified or rediscovered as a distinct variety of Aramaic in the nineteenth century.

== Corpus ==
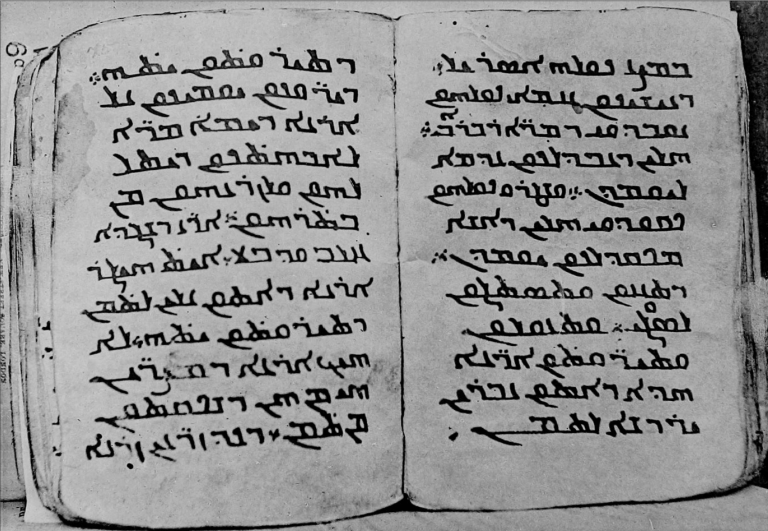
Deuteronomy 11:7–10 from the Lewis lectionary, 11th century (Westminster College, Cambridge)

The only surviving original texts in CPA are inscriptions in mosaics and rock caves (lavras), magical silver amulets and a single short magical booklet. All other surviving manuscript compositions are translations of Greek originals.

Many of the palimpsests come from Saint Catherine's Monastery in the Sinai Peninsula (e.g., the Codex Climaci Rescriptus), but some also from Mar Saba (e.g., part of the Codex Sinaiticus Rescriptus), the Cairo Genizah (Note: Today in the Taylor-Schechter Collection, University Library of Cambridge; Bodleian Library, Oxford; and Museum of Pennsylvania, Philadelphia) and the Umayyad Mosque in Damascus. They often transmit rare texts lost in the Greek transmission (e.g. the Transitus Mariae; the hitherto unknown martyrdom of Patriklos of Caesarea, one of the eleven followers of Pamphilus of Caesarea; and a missing quire of Codex Climaci Rescriptus), or offer valuable readings for the textual criticism of the Septuagint.

Two palimpsests found at Saint Catherine's represented the Palestinian Syriac version of the Bible. This Bible was originally known as the Jerusalem Syriac version, from a Vatican codex dating to 1030. The palimpsests have been dated by their colophons to 1104 and 1118. It's believed that by that time, Palestinian Aramaic had been supplanted by Arabic and even priests were barely able to read and understand the sacred texts.

Inscriptions have been found in Palestine in the area of Jerusalem at the Church of Saint Anne, and to the east in the Judaean Desert at ʿEn Suweinit, near ʿAbūd, as well as ʿUmm er-Rūs, and at Mevo Modiim. In the Negev, four find spots are in its north: Khirbet Qaṣra (to the south of Bet Guvrin/Eleutheropolis), Giv’ot Bar (south of Rahat), Anab al-Kabīr, and Hūrah. Nessana, an important Byzantine era town along the border with Egypt, yielded several CPA papyrus fragments, alongside those in Greek, Latin, and Arabic. Other find spots include those in the vicinity of Hippos at Uyun Umm el-ˁAẓām in Galilee, and at Khirbet Qastra near Haifa, the latter of which can be clustered with three others from the Upper Western Galilee at Evron, Shlomi and Kabri/Khirbet el-Khazneh. Uyun Umm el-Azam is considered a northern outlier of the Northern Jordanian Highlands cluster (outlined below), along with Deir al-Adas in Syria.

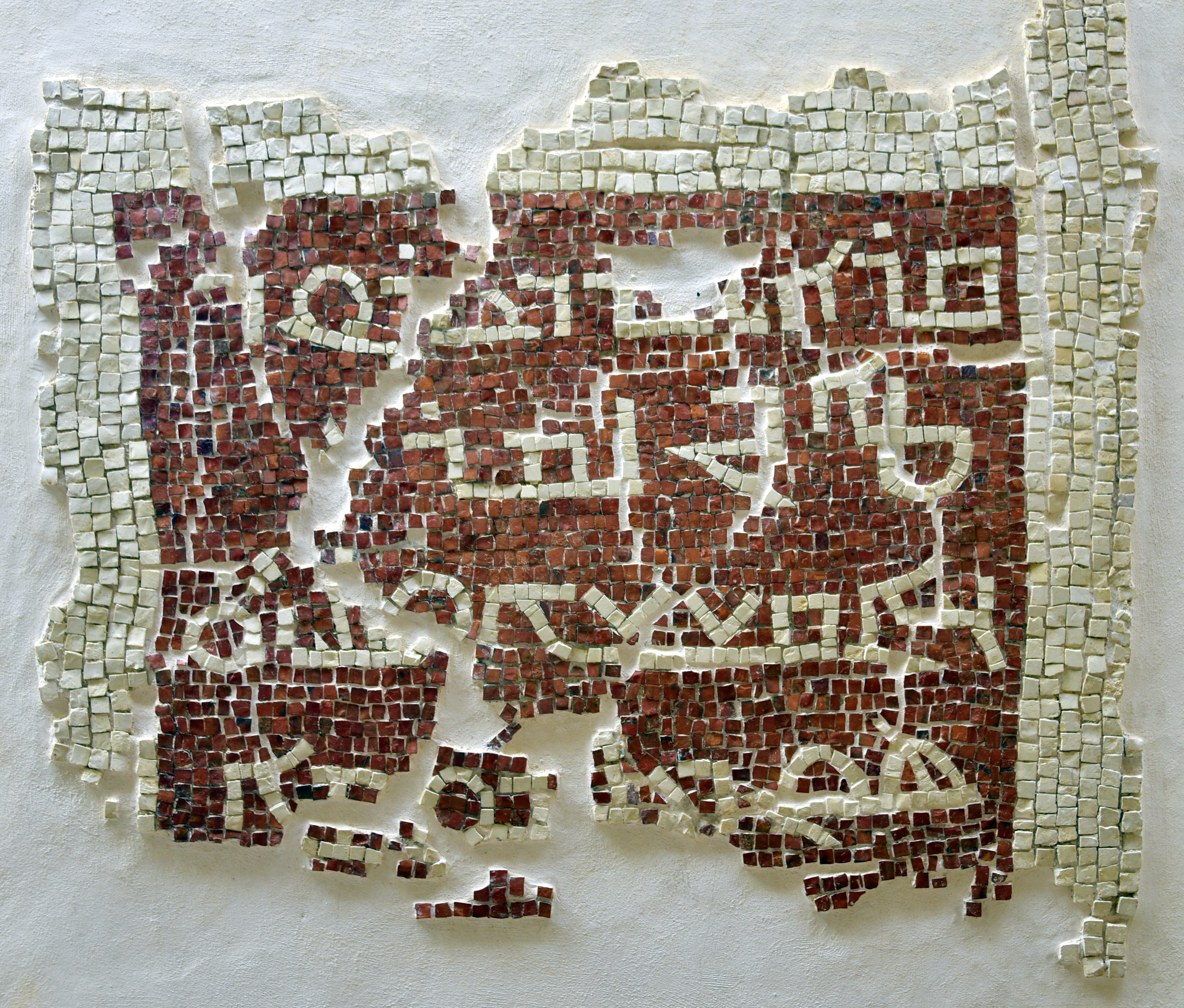
CPA inscription in a mosaic discovered in the Kayanos Church, displayed in the museum on Mount Nebo

In the Transjordan, inscriptions are clustered in the area of the Northern Jordanian Highlands. They have been found in the north of what was once the Decapolis, around Irbid, in el-Burz, Qam, and Dayr el-Saˁneh, as well as in Wadi Rājib west of Ajloun. In the Jerash/Gerasa area, inscriptions were found in the old city, as well as in the steppe region to the east, specifically in Riḥāb, Khayyān el-Mushrif, and on tombstones in Khirbet el-Samrā. In the south of the Decapolis, around Amman, finds were in el-Quwaysmeh, Khirbet el-Kursī, as well as further south in the area of Mount Nebo, in Ayūn Mūsa and Khirbet el-Mukhayyat. Finds outside of the Highlands area include one of graffiti much farther to the east around Qasr Burqu', as well as two from the southeastern end of the Dead Sea; one an inscription in stone at the monastic complex of Qaṣr el-ˀAbyad, and the other a fragment of parchment from the area of Lot's cave at ˁAyn ˁAbāṭah.

The manuscripts include a short letter on papyrus from Khibert Mird and at least one wooden board. The parchment manuscript fragments are Biblical (mostly in the form of lectionaries), Patristic, theological (e.g. the catecheses by Cyril of Jerusalem and homilies by John Chrysostom), hagiographic (mostly martyrs' lives) or apocryphal (e.g., the Transitus Mariae). There are only three dated manuscripts, the Gospel lectionaries of 1030, 1104, and 1118.

== Features ==
CPA can be distinguished from JPA and SA by the lack of direct influence from Hebrew and new Hebrew loanwords, its Hebrew loanwords being retained from an earlier symbiosis of Hebrew and Aramaic. It is also distinguished by the presence of Greek syntax (by partial retention in translation). Also, unlike JPA and SA, CPA is attested only in primary texts (mostly in palimpsests). There was no transmission of manuscripts after the language itself went out use as liturgical language. In comparison with its counterparts, therefore, the CPA corpus represents an older, more intact example of Western Aramaic from when the dialects were still living, spoken languages.

There is an evident Arabic substrate to CPA, indicating the influence of Old Arabic on its lexicon and structure, which explains why speakers of this dialect were among the first to transition towards using Levantine Arabic dialects.

== Editions of texts ==
=== Manuscripts ===
- Jan P. N. Land, Anecdota Syriaca IV (Leiden, 1875), pp. 177–233 [Latin], pp. 103–224 [Syropalestinian], pls. I–VI.
- James Rendall Harris, Biblical Fragments from Mount Sinai (Cambridge, 1890), pp. 65–68.
- Paul de Lagarde, Evangeliarum Hierosolymitanum (Bibliothecae syriacae; Göttingen, 1892), pp. 257–402.
- George H. Gwilliam, The Palestinian Version of the Holy Scriptures (Anecdota Oxoniensia, Semitic Series Vol. I Part V; Oxford, 1893).
- George H. Gwilliam, Francis Crawford Burkitt, John F. Stenning, Biblical and Patristic Relics of the Palestinian Syriac Literature, (Anecdota Oxoniensia, Semitic Series Vol. I, Part IX; Oxford, 1896).
- G. Margoliouth, The Liturgy of the Nile, Journal of the Royal Asiatic Society 1896, pp. 677–727, pls. I–II.
- Agnes S. Lewis and Margaret D. Gibson, The Palestinian Syriac Lectionary of the Gospels (London, 1899).
- Agnes S. Lewis and Margaret D. Gibson, Palestinian Syriac Texts from Palimpsest Fragments in the Taylor-Schechter Collection (London, 1900).
- Agnes S. Lewis and Margaret D. Gibson, An Appendix of Palestinian Syriac Texts (Studia Sinaitica XI; London, 1902), pp. XXVIII–XXIX, XLVII.
- Friedrich Schulthess, Christlich-palästinische Fragmente, Zeitschrift der Deutschen Morgenländischen Gesellschaft 56, 1902, pp. 249–261.
- Friedrich Schulthess, Christlich-palästinische Fragmente aus der Omajjaden-Moschee zu Damaskus (Berlin, 1905).
- Pavel K. Kokowzoff, Nouveaux fragments syropalestiniens de la Bibliothèque Impériale Publique de Saint-Pétersbourg (St. Petersburg, 1906).
- Hugo Duensing, Christlich-palästinisch-aramäische Texte und Fragmente (Göttingen, 1906).
- Agnes S. Lewis, A Palestinian Syriac Lectionary: Containing Lessons from the Pentateuch, Job, Proverbs, Prophets, Acts, and Epistles (Cambridge, 1897).
- Agnes S. Lewis, Supplement to a Palestinian Syriac Lectionary (Cambridge, 1907).
- Agnes S. Lewis, Codex Climaci Rescriptus (Horae Semiticae VIII; Cambridge, 1909).
- Agnes S. Lewis, The Forty Martyrs of the Sinai Desert and the Story of Eulogios (Horae Semiticae IX; Cambridge, 1912).
- Matthew Black, Rituale Melchitarum. A Christian Palestinian Euchologion (Stuttgart, 1938).
- Matthew Black, "A Palestinian Syriac Palimpsest Leaf of Acts XXI (14–26)," Bulletin of the John Rylands Library 23, 1939, pp. 201–214, pls. 1–2.
- N. Pigoulewski, "Fragments syro-palestiniens des Psaumes CXXIII–IV," Revue Bibilque 43 (1934), pp. 519–527, pl. XXX.
- Hugo Duensing, Neue christlich-palästinische-aramäische Fragmente, NAWG, phil.-hist. Kl. 9 (Göttingen, 1944).
- Matthew Black, A Christian Palestinian Syriac Horologion (Texts and Studies N.S. 1; Cambridge, 1954).
- Hugo Duensing, Nachlese christlich-palästinisch aramäischer Fragmente, NAWG, phil.-hist. Kl. 5 (Göttingen, 1955).
- Charles Perrot, "Un fragment christo-palestinien découvert à Khirbet Mird," Revue Biblique 70, 1963, pp. 506–555, pls. XVIII–XXIX.
- Moshe Goshen-Gottstein with the Assistance by H. Shirun (ed.), The Bible in the Syropalestinian Version. Part I. Pentateuch and Prophets (Publications of the Hebrew University Bible Project Monograph Series; Jerusalem, 1973).
- Christa Müller-Kessler and Michael Sokoloff, The Christian Palestinian Aramaic Old Testament and Apocrypha (Corpus of Christian Palestinian Aramaic I; Groningen, 1997). ISBN 90-5693-007-9
- Maurice Baillet, "Un livret magique en christo-palestinien à l’Université de Louvain," Le Muséon 76, 1963, pp. 375–401.
- Sebastian P. Brock, A Fragment of the Acta Pilati in Christian Palestinian Aramaic, Journal of Theological Studies N.S. 22, 1971, pp. 157–158.
- Sebastian P. Brock, Catalogue of the New Finds (Athens, 1995).
- Alain Desreumaux, Codex sinaiticus Zosimi rescriptus (Histoire du Texte Biblique 3; Lausanne, 1997). ISBN 2-9700088-3-1
- Alain Desreumaux, "Une inscription araméenne melkite sous une peinture copte du musée du Louvre. Le texte araméen melkite," Oriens Christianus 86, 1996, pp. 82–97.
- Christa Müller-Kessler and Michael Sokoloff, The Christian Palestinian Aramaic New Testament Version from the Early Period. Gospels (Corpus of Christian Palestinian Aramaic IIA; Groningen, 1998). ISBN 90-5693-018-4
- Christa Müller-Kessler and Michael Sokoloff, The Christian Palestinian Aramaic New Testament Version from the Early Period. Acts of the Apostles and Epistles (Corpus of Christian Palestinian Aramaic IIB; Groningen, 1998). ISBN 90-5693-019-2
- Sebastian P. Brock, Fragments of PS-John Chrysostom, Homily on the Prodigal Son, in Christian Palestinian Aramaic, Le Muséon 112, 1999, pp. 335–362.
- Christa Müller-Kessler and Michael Sokoloff, The Catechism of Cyril of Jerusalem in the Christian Palestinian Aramaic Version (A Corpus of Christian Palestinian Aramaic V; Groningen, 1999). ISBN 90-5693-030-3
- Christa Müller-Kessler, Codex Sinaiticus Rescriptus. A Collection of Christian Palestinian Aramaic Manuscripts, Le Muséon 127, 2014, pp. 263–309.
- Alin Suciu, "An Addition to Christian Palestinian Aramaic Literary Corpus: Logos XV of Abba Isaiah of Scetis," Journal of Semitic Studies 61, 2016, pp. 449–461.
- Christa Müller-Kessler, "Three Early Witnesses of the «Dormition of Mary» in Christian Palestinian Aramaic: Palimpsests from the Cairo Genizah (Taylor-Schechter Collection) and the New Finds in St Catherine's Monastery," Apocrypha 29 (2018), pp. 69–95.
- Laurent Capron, Deux fragments d’épittres pauliniennes (1 Thess. et 1 Cor.) en araméen christopalestinien, Semitica 61, 2019, 117–127.
- Christa Müller-Kessler, "An Overlooked Christian Palestinian Aramaic Witness of the Dormition of Mary in Codex Climaci Rescriptus (CCR IV)," Collectanea Christiana Orientalia 16, 2019, pp. 81–98.
- C. Müller-Kessler, "The Unknown Martyrdom of Patriklos of Caesarea in Christian Palestinian Aramaic from St Catherine's Monastery (Sinai, Arabic NF 66)," Analecta Bollandiana 137, 2019, pp. 63–71.

=== Inscriptions ===
- M. Halloun and R. Rubin, "Palestinian Syriac Inscription from ‘En Suweinit," Liber Annuus 31, 1981, pp. 291–298, pls. 59–62.
