= Alain Desreumaux =

French historian of religion

Alain Desreumaux (born 1944) is a French historian of religion, specializing on Syrian and Aramaic christo-palestinian communities. He has uncovered manuscripts and inscriptions and published works on codicology and epigraphy.

He is president and cofounder of the Société d'études syriaques.

== Early life ==
Desreumaux was born in 1994 in Stains, Seine-Saint-Denis, France.

== Works ==
- 1997: Doctrine de l’Apôtre Addaï, dans Les Écrits Apocryphes Chrétiens I - Bibliothèque de la Pléiade 442 - Éditions Gallimard, Paris
- Histoire du roi Abgar et de Jésus : Presentation and translation of the full Syrian text of the Addai doctrine (Brepols)
- Khirbet Es-Samra I: the first volume is entitled Khirbet es-Samra I. It was prepared under the direction of Jean-Baptiste Humbert and Alain Desreumaux, and under the aegis of the "École biblique et archéologique française de Jérusalem" and the "Centre d'études des religions du Livre du CNRS".
- 2003: Manuscrits chrétiens du Proche-Orient - [printed text] / Françoise Briquel-Chatonnet, Alain Desreumaux, Maria Gorea ... [et al.]; published by the Centre de conservation du livre (Arles) and the Manumed
- 2004: Les Études syriaques - publiées par la Société d'études syriaques; dir. Alain Desreumaux, Françoise Briquel Chatonnet, Muriel Debié. Geuthner; series Études syriaques. - 956 (21) + 492.3 (21) - ISSN 1771-6144 = Études syriaques.
- 2006: Voyage dans la diversité chrétienne - by Alain Desreumaux - Le Monde de la Bible - 174, November–December
- 2010: Sur les pas des Araméens chrétiens : festschrift to Alain Desreumaux, Geuthner
