= Umm er Rus =

Ancient ruin in the Judean mountains

- أم الرؤوس (Arabic) חורבת אום א-רוס
- Khŭrbet Umm er Rûs (Arabic) / Horbat Bet Bad (Hebrew)
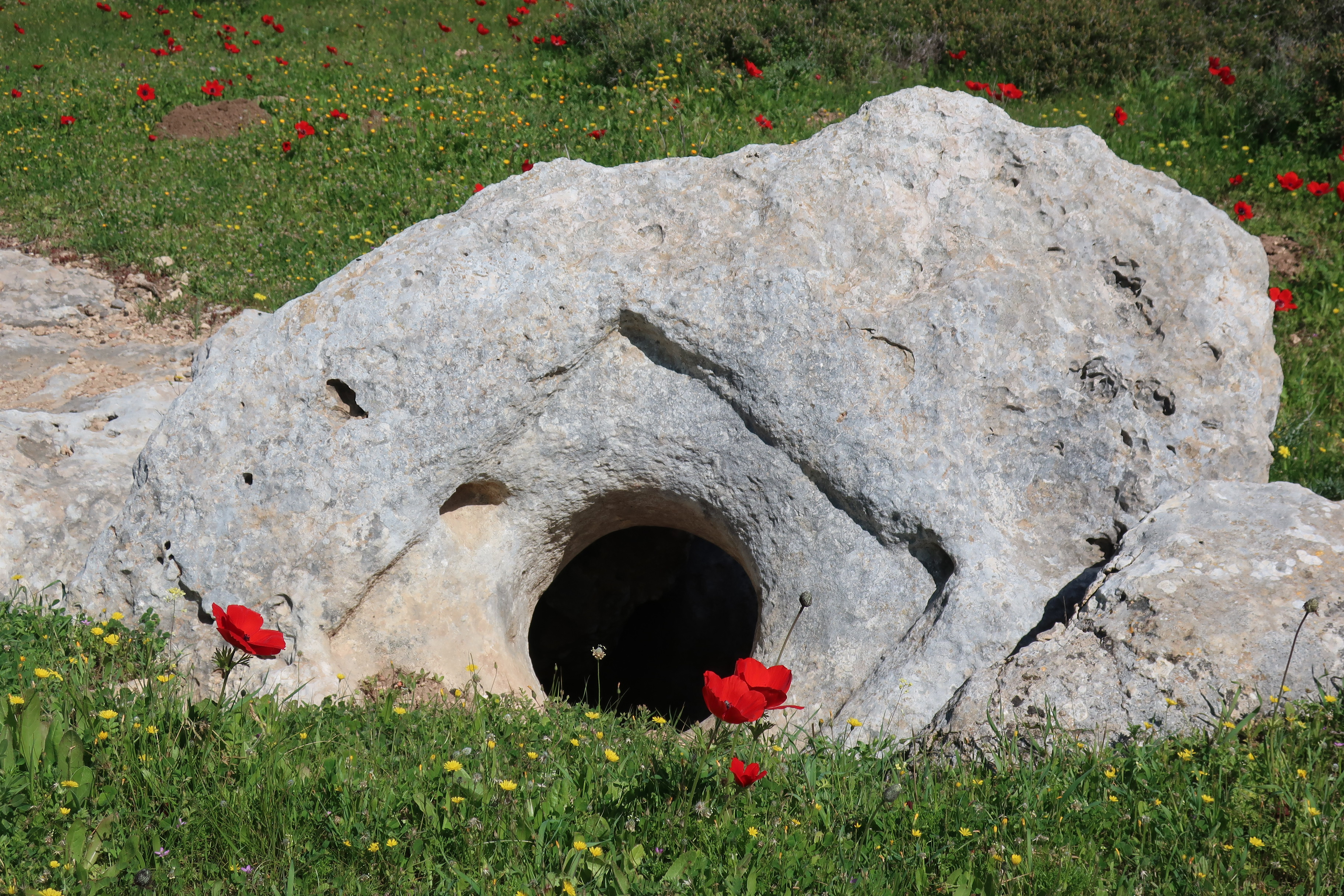
- Overturned stone covering at mouth of well

- Location within Israel
- 31°41′20.9″N 35°01′16.76″E
- Periods: Hellenistic, Roman, Byzantine
- Location: Israel
- Region: Judaean Mountains

History
- Built: unknown
- Abandoned: unknown

Site notes
- Height: 443 m (1,453 ft)
- Area: c. 15 dunams
- Excavation dates: none
- Archaeologists: surveyed by Dani Weiss, Boaz Zissu, and Gideon Solimany
- Condition: Ruin
- Public access: yes

Umm er Rus (also Um Ra'us; Arabic: امّ الرؤوس, lit. 'mother of the summits') is a Roman-Byzantine era ruin in central Israel. It is situated on a high spur in the Judaean Mountains, overlooking the Elah Valley, and lies just under one mile northeast of the modern village of Aviezer.

== Name ==
The site was formerly known in Arabic as Umm er Rûs esh-Shamālīya ("the northern Umm er Rus") to distinguish it from another site of the same name on an adjacent hill to the south.

Its Arabic name derives from the elevated prospect it affords, with the broader connotation of "the place with the hill-top." The site's older Hebrew name is no longer known.

== History ==
During Israel's Second Temple Period, the village was located in the district known then as Idumaea, named presumably for its inhabitants who were descended from the progeny of Esau, their ancestor, and who came to embrace the Jewish religion in the days of John Hyrcanus.

By the mid-1st-century CE, the inhabitants of this district sought independence from the yoke of the Roman Imperial army. Nothing is known of the village's demise, although it can be assumed that, owing to its proximity to Bethletephon (Beit Nettif), the village fell along with Bethletephon during the initial Roman onslaught of that region by Vespasian, who sent against them the Tenth and Fifteenth legions, in an effort to quell the insurrection.

He (Vespasian) came to the toparchy of Bethletephon. He then destroyed that place, and the neighboring places, by fire, and fortified, at proper places, the strong holds all about Idumaea; and when he had seized upon two villages, which were in the very midst of Idumaea, Betaris and Caphartobas, he slew above ten thousand of the people, and carried into captivity above a thousand, and drove away the rest of the multitude, and placed no small part of his own forces in them, who overran and laid waste the whole mountainous country.

The site may have been resettled and destroyed a second time during the outbreak of hostilities under Hadrian, a time of great upheaval and unrest in Judea, as described by Cassius Dio's Roman History.

Fifty of their most important outposts and nine hundred and eighty-five of their most famous villages were razed to the ground. Five hundred and eighty thousand men were slain in the various raids and battles, and the number of those that perished by famine, disease and fire was past finding out. Thus nearly the whole of Judaea was made desolate .

In 1883 the PEF's Survey of Western Palestine described the "Umm ar Rus": "Foundations, walls, and cisterns. They appear to be Crusading work."

== Description ==
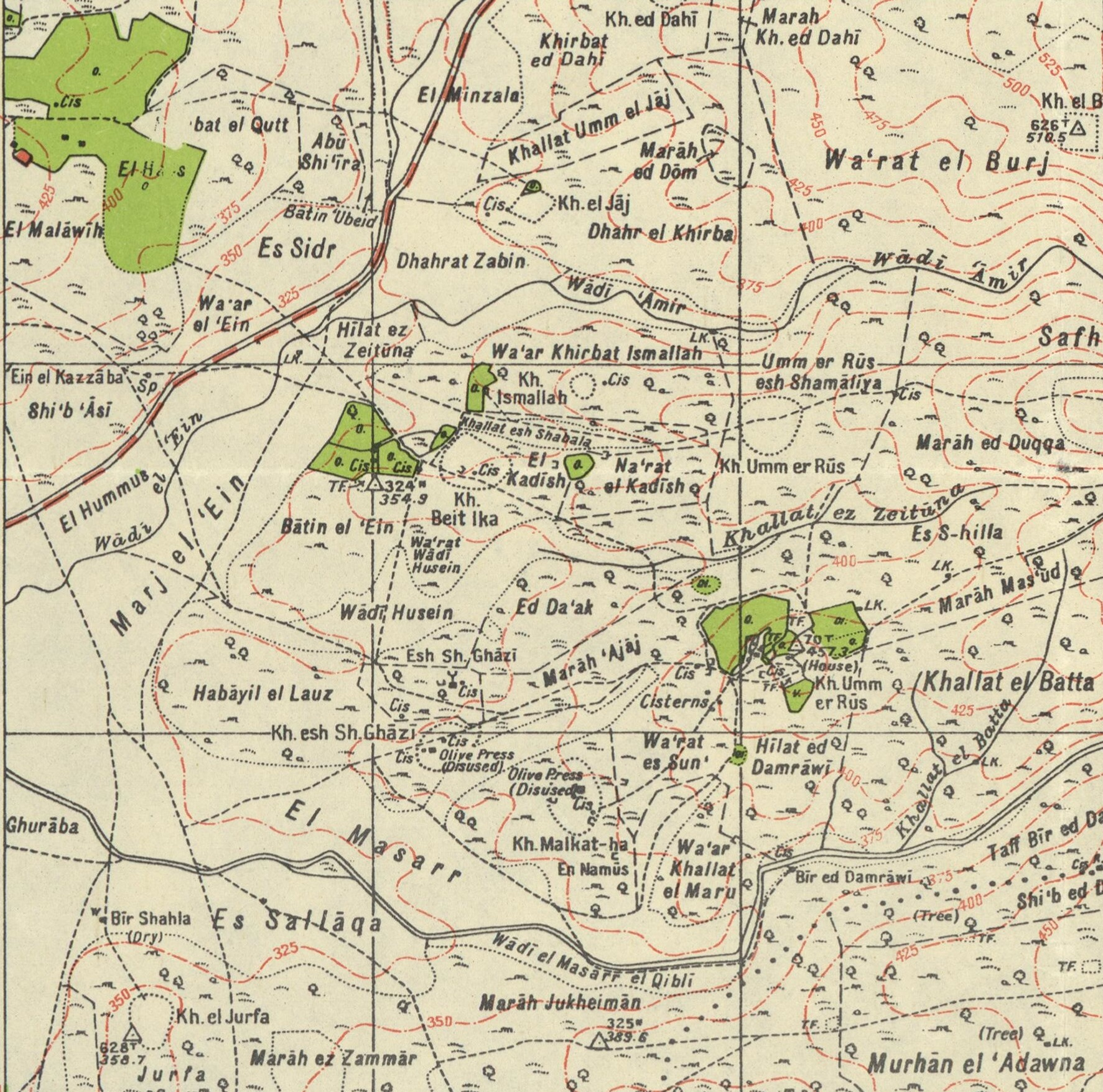
Three places marked as Umm er Rus in a 1940s Survey of Palestine map.

The current ruin sits at a mean elevation of 443 metres (1,453 ft) above sea-level, sprawling over an area of about 15 dunams (3.7 acres). Potsherds are strewn across its grounds, with several razed houses, one of which showing several courses of large, hewn ashlars, measuring upwards of 2 metres. A wall which once served as the village's defences is broken down. A rock-cut tomb lay on the village's western-most quarter. A massive stone-carved well-covering is seen partially upturned over the mouth of the village well, in its eastern quarters.

=== Umm er Rus (southern site) ===
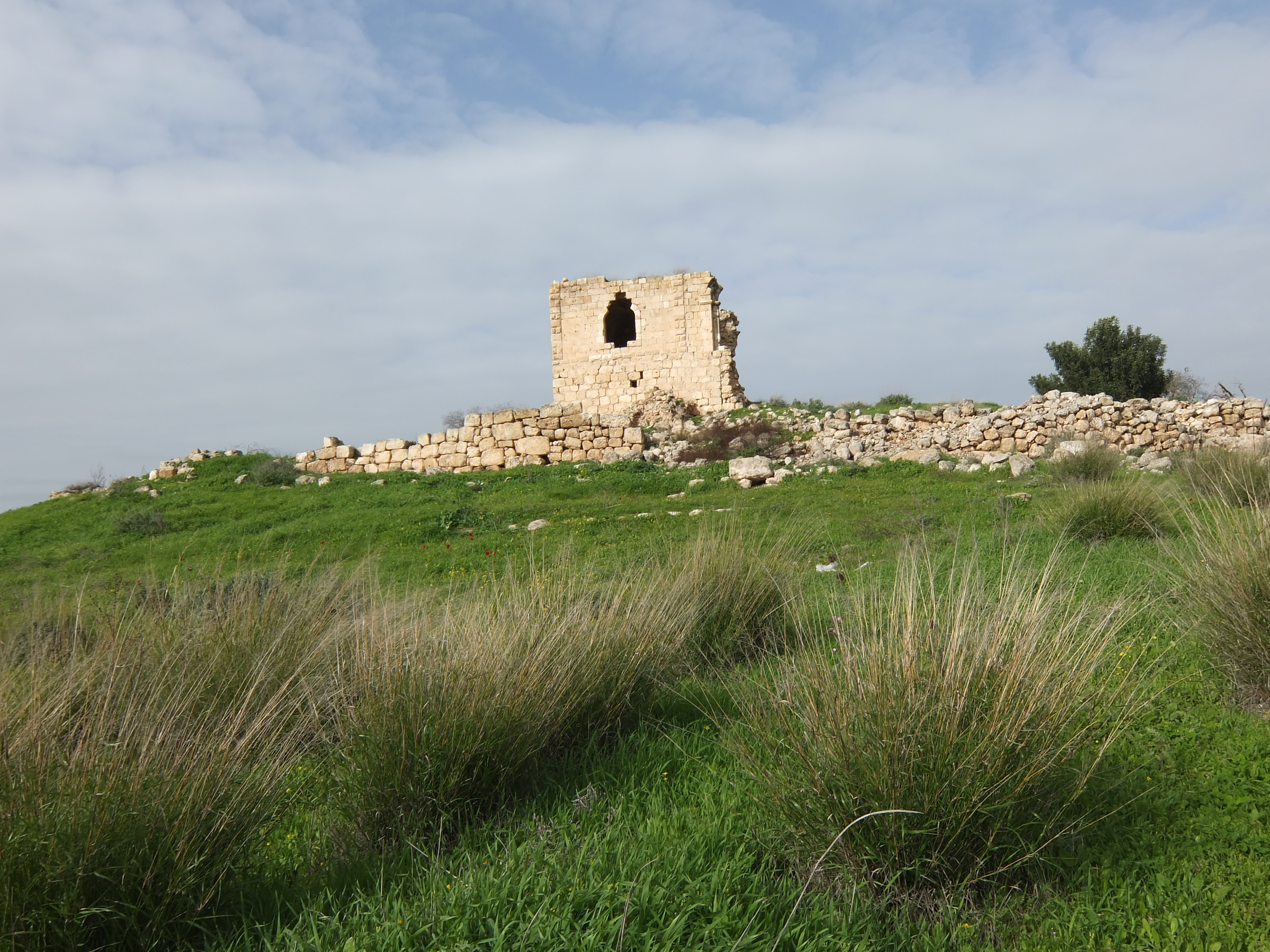
Qasr Chumais in Umm er Rus, southern site (Horbat Beit Bad)

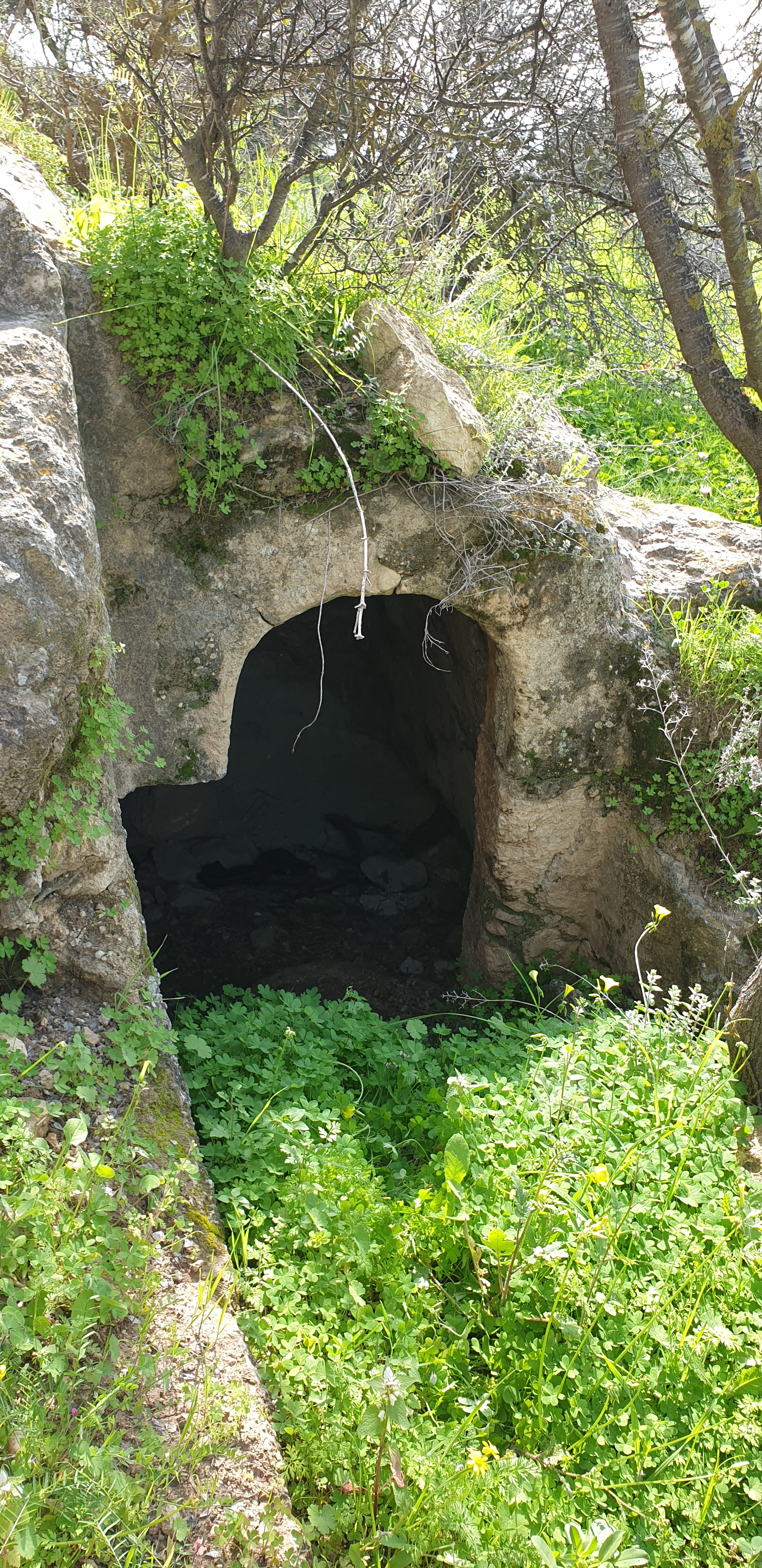
Second Temple Period mikveh

The southern site (31.683454°N 35.021127°E), also known by the name Umm er Rus, is distanced 2.5 kilometers southeast of Beit Nattif and sits on the fringes of Moshav Aviezer, at an elevation of 454 metres (1,490 ft) above sea level. The site was inhabited by Jews during the early and late Roman era period, based on the discovery of a ritual bath in situ. To distinguish it from its sister site to the north, the southern site has been given the additional name Ḥorbat Beit Bad ("the ruin of the olive press"). A Byzantine Church is known to have existed at the site in late antiquity, where was discovered in 1898 a dedicatory inscription to St. John in both Greek and Syriac. A crypt belonging to the church, with arcosolia in the walls, was resurveyed in 2014 by inspectors from the Antiquities Theft Prevention Unit following damage to the site caused by antiquities looters. According to archaeologist Eitan Klein, the cave walls were coated with gray plaster of the type characteristic of the Second Temple period, suggesting that this was a ritual bath from that period that was later converted into a burial cave.

Wine presses are noticeable on the site, cisterns, underground storage facilities, as well as a rock-cut, plastered ritual bath (mikveh), hewn in a trapezoidal manner and measuring approximately 3.1–3.6 x 3.6–4.1 m (10.1–11.8 x 11.8–13.4 ft.), connected to a large underground water reservoir (approximately 9 x 8 m). The potsherds and fragments of a spindle-like bottle attest to a Jewish settlement in the 2nd century BCE to the 2nd century CE.

The site has a history of being plagued by antiquities robbers.

=== Further reading ===
- Vincent, H. (1898). "Une église à Oumm er Rous". Revue Biblique (in French). 7 (4). Leuven: Peeters Publishers: 611–615. JSTOR 44100398.
- Vincent, H. (1898). "Encore l'église à Oumm er Rous". Revue Biblique (in French). 8. Leuven: Peeters Publishers: 452–457.

== Gallery ==
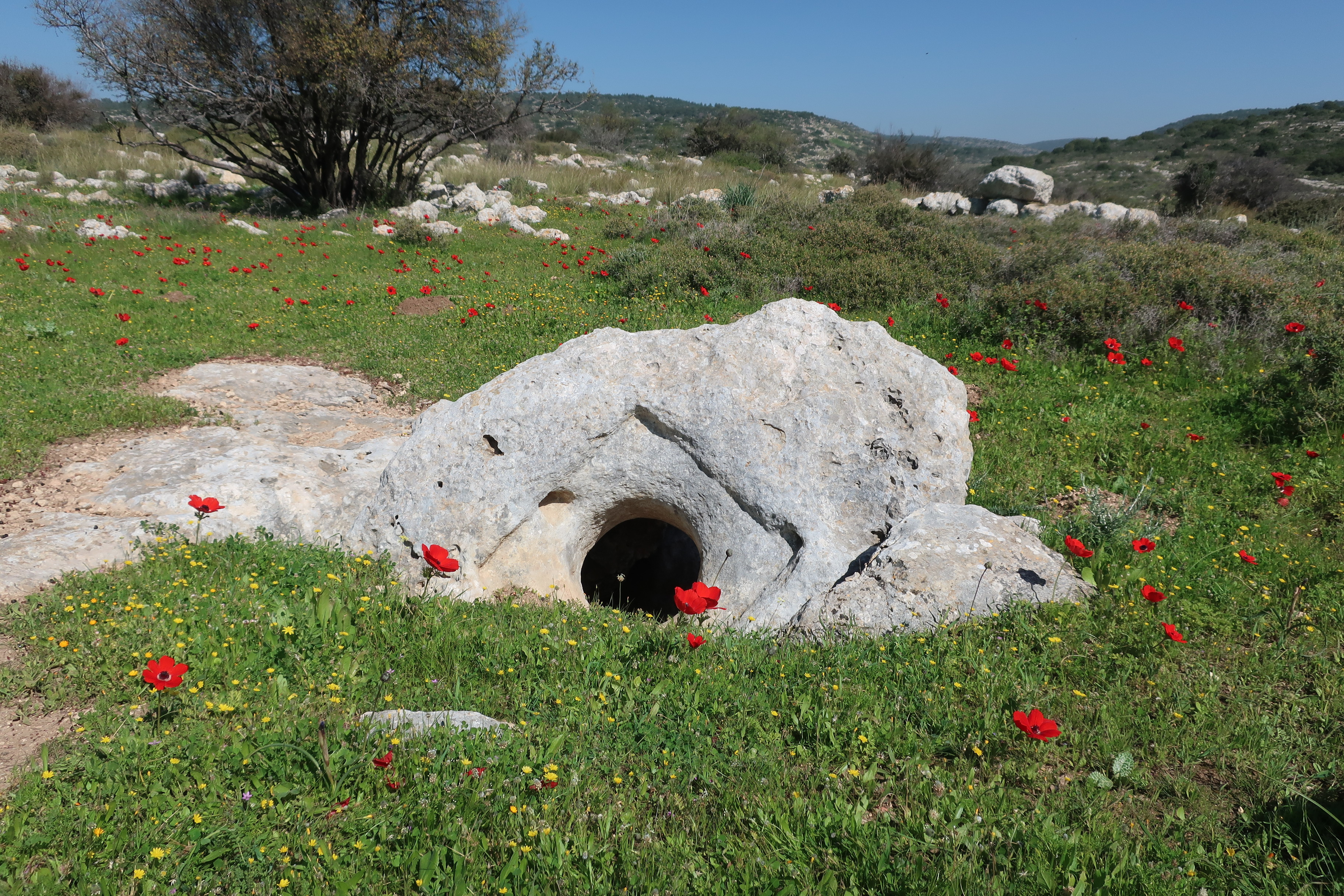
Upturned stone covering of well

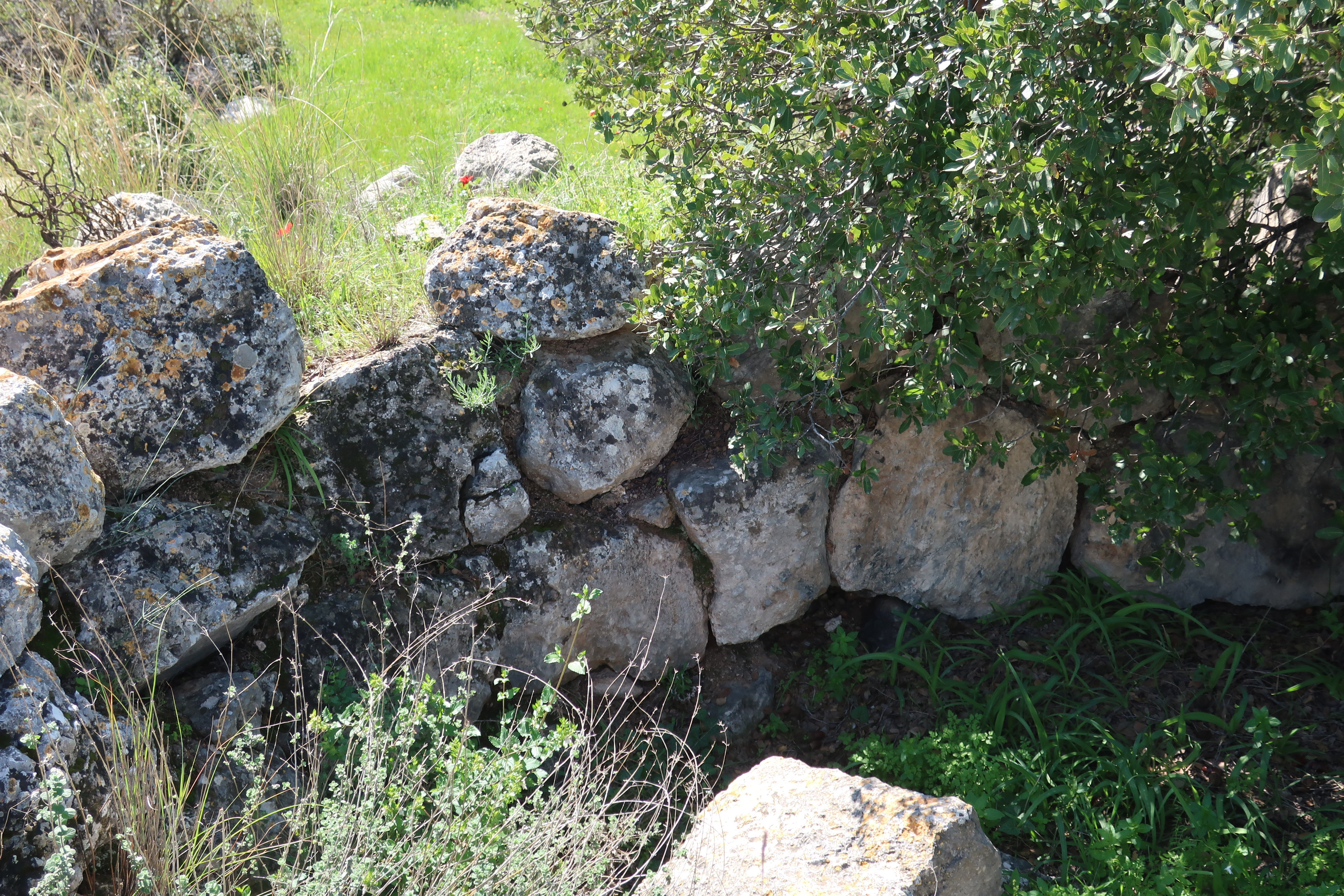
Walled structure of old house

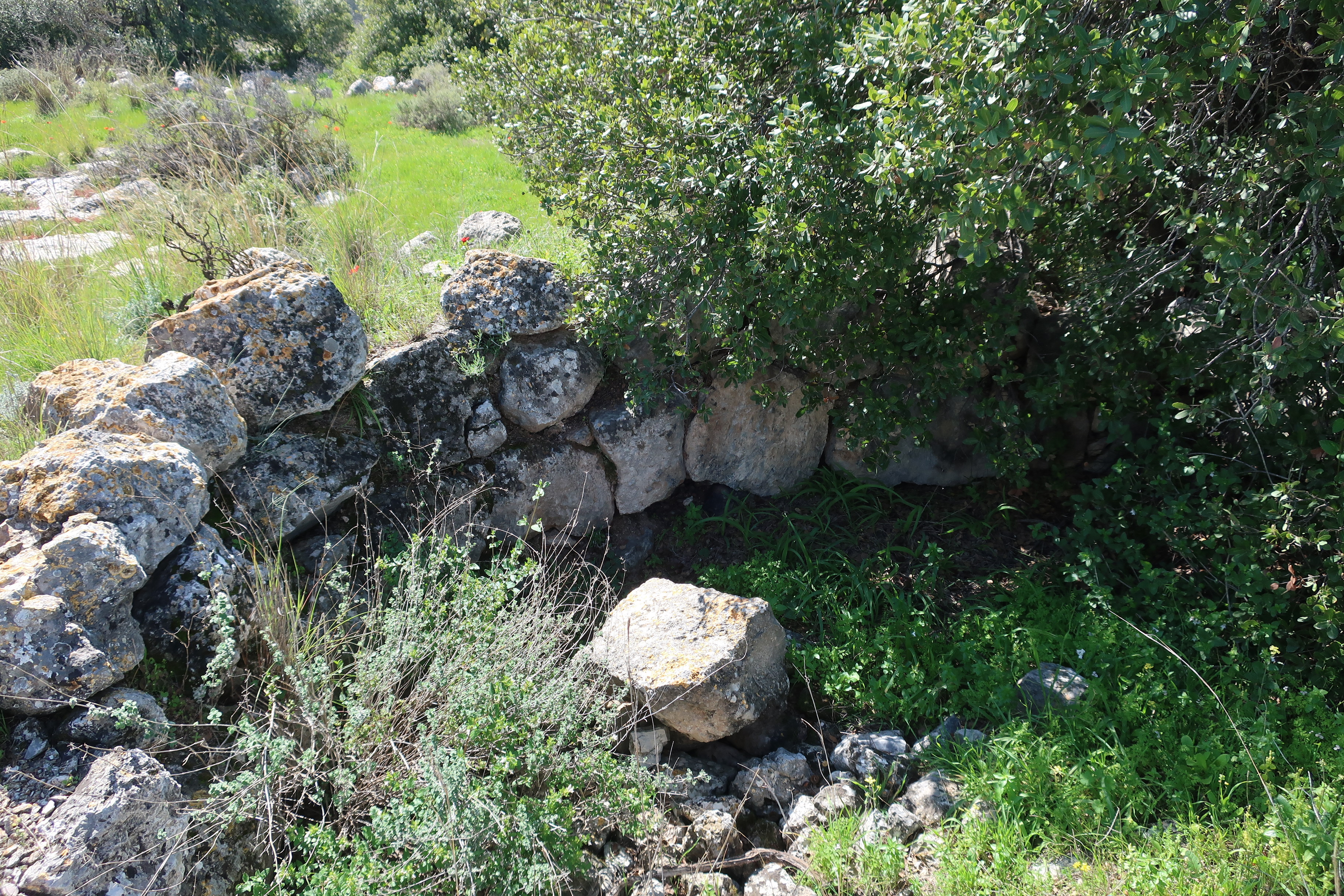
House ruins in Umm er Rus

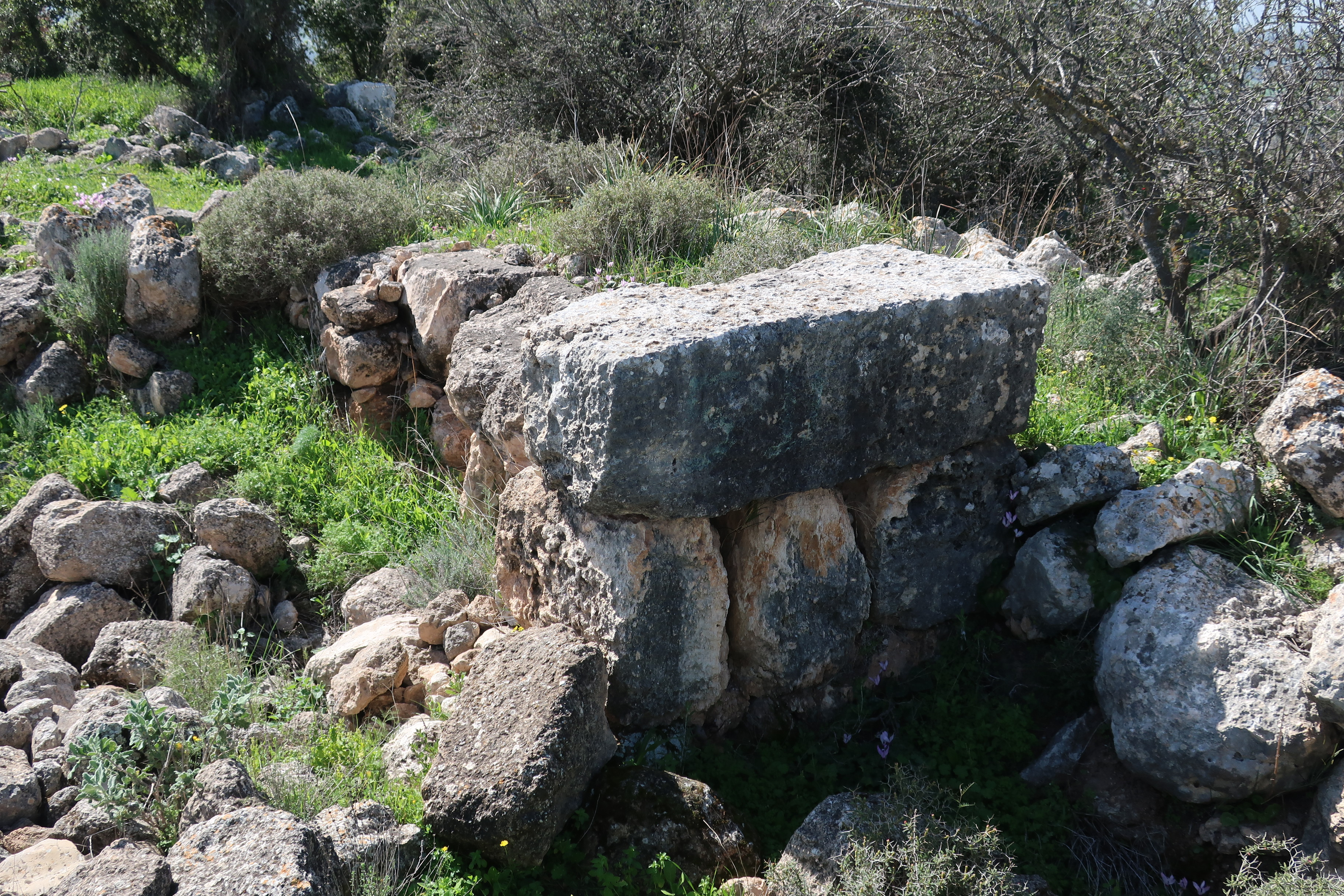
Stone blocks used in wall of house

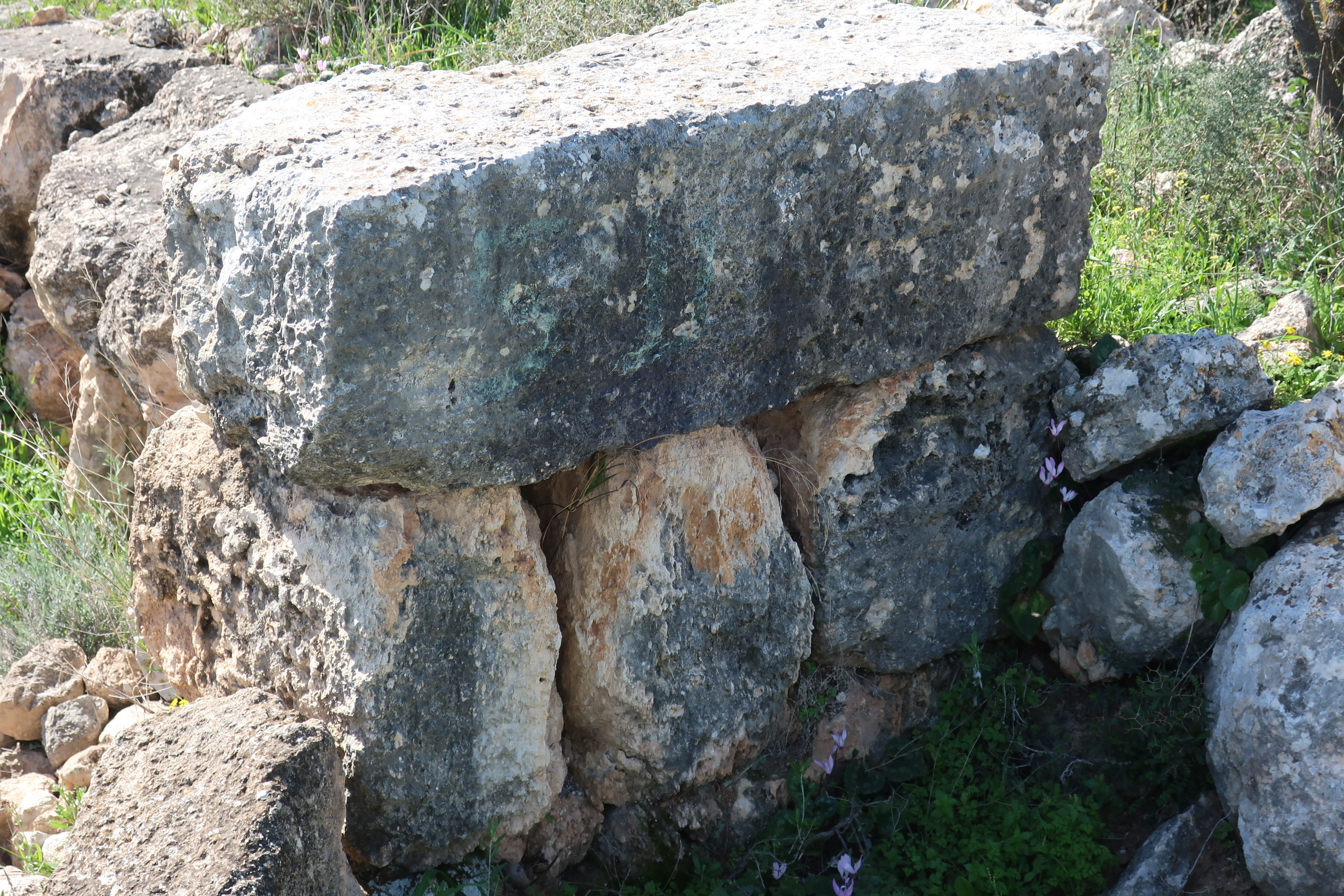
Hewn stone used as wall of house

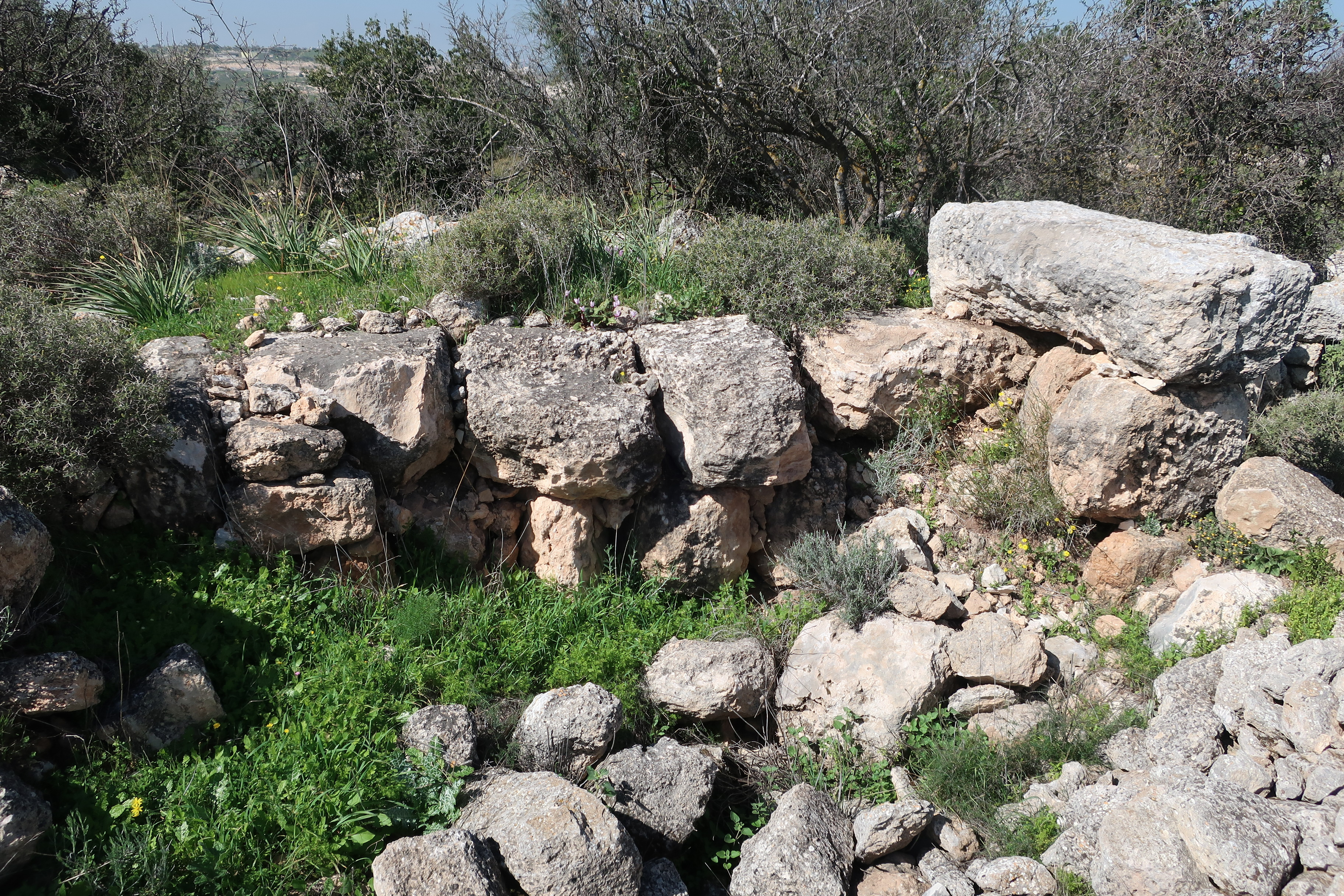
General view of razed house

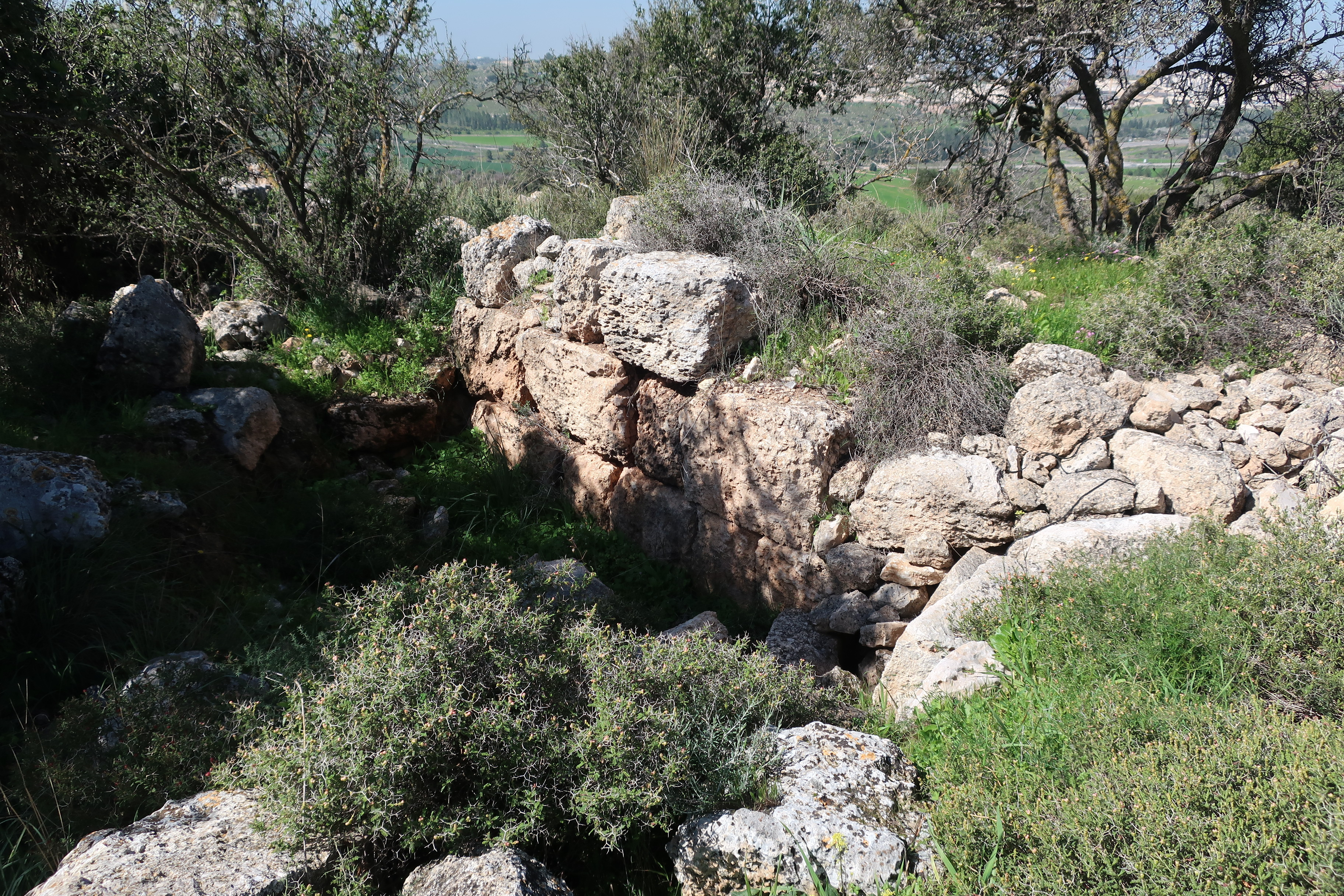
Old structure at the Umm er Rus ruin

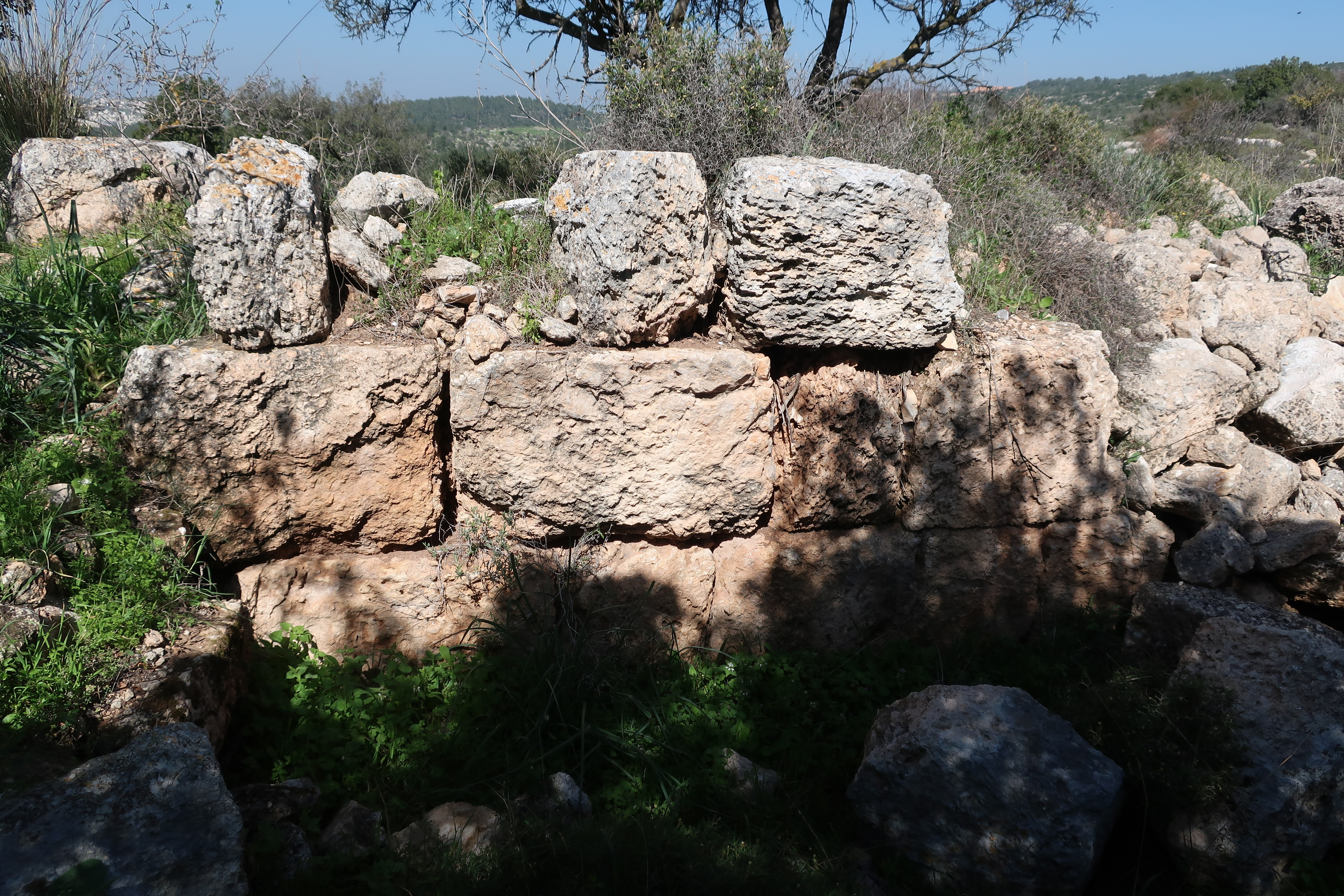
Stones of razed house

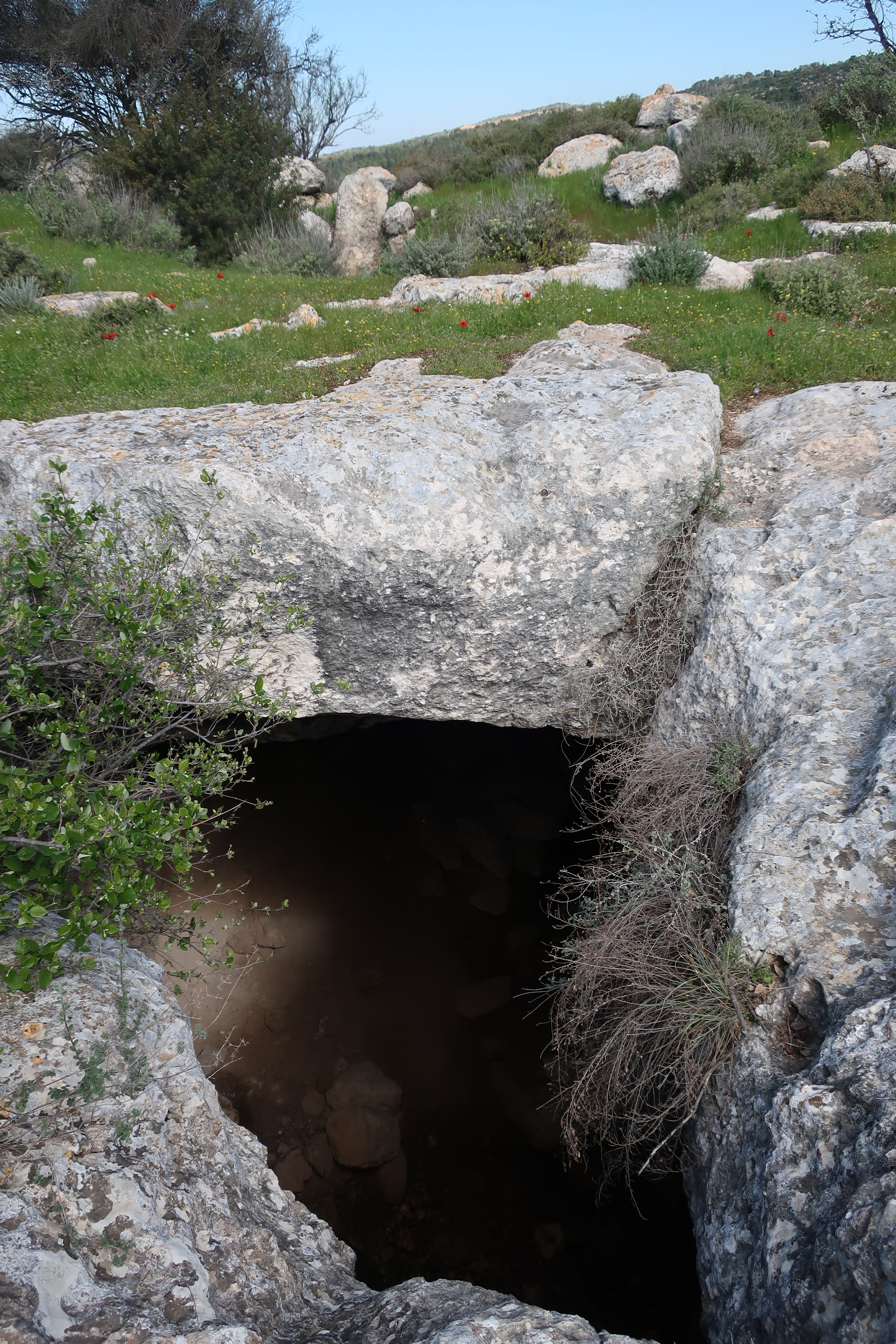
Cave-like pit (jīʻ) accessible from the side, at Umm er Rus (northern site)

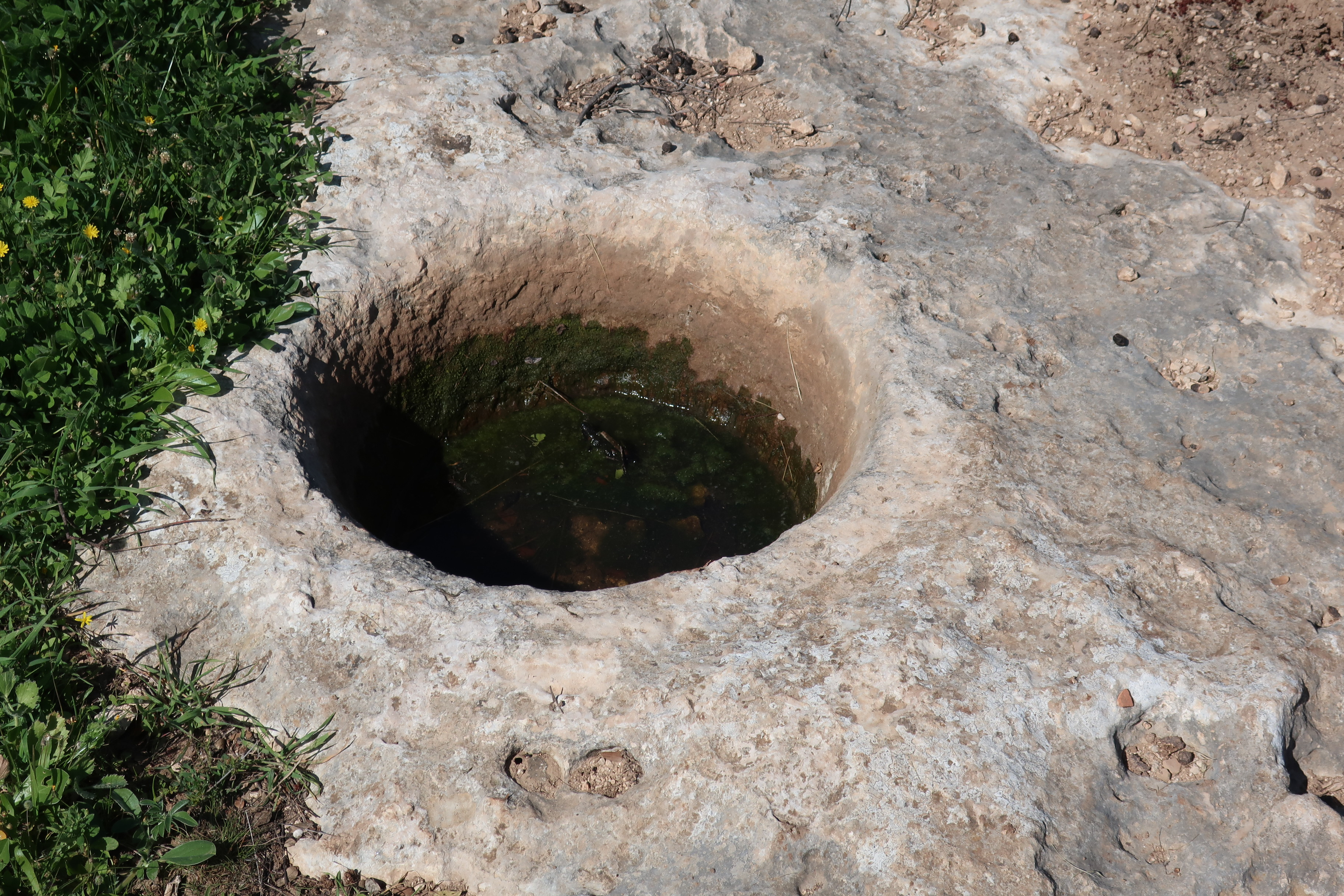
Impression carved in rock, possibly a launderer's pool

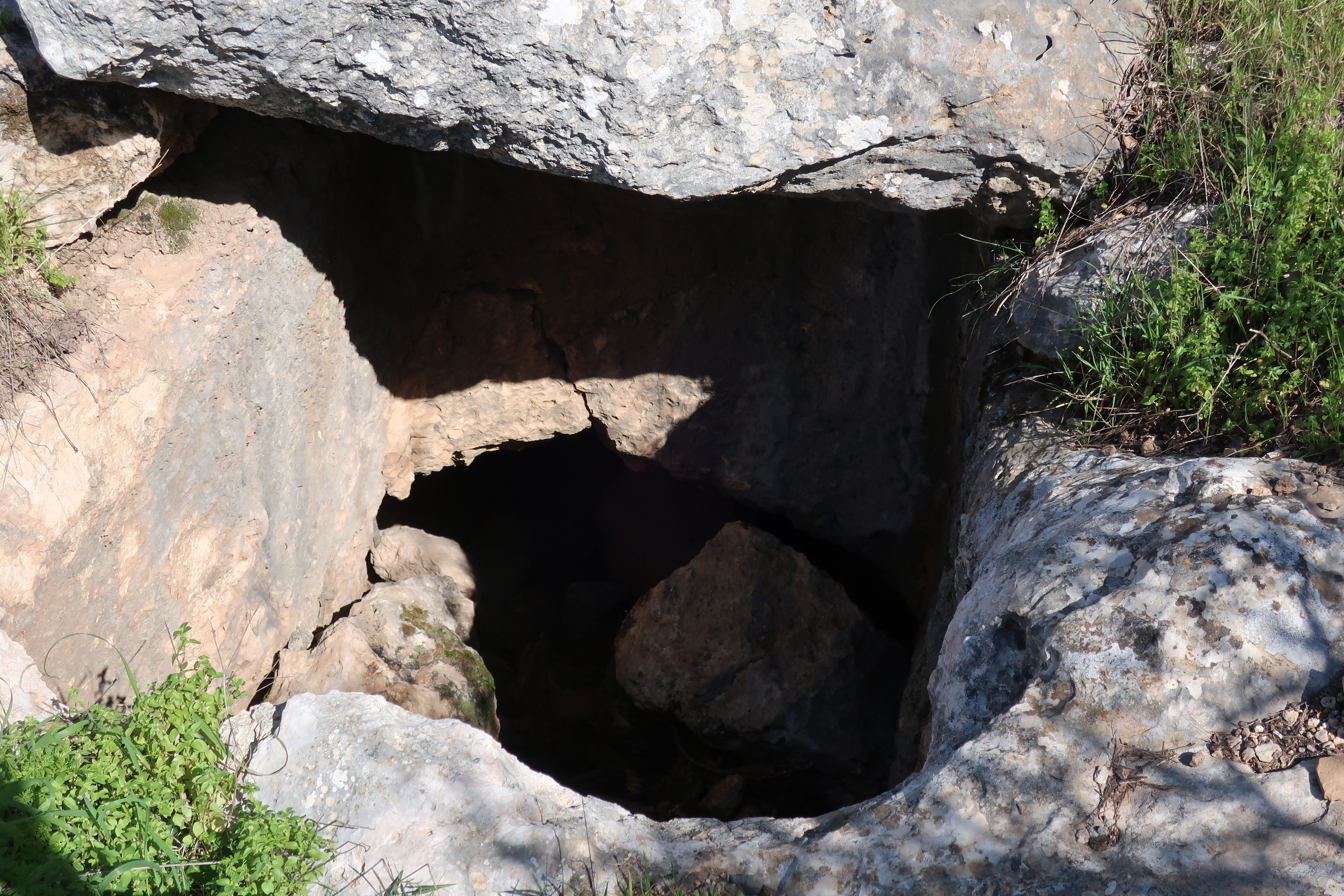
Ancient burial tomb

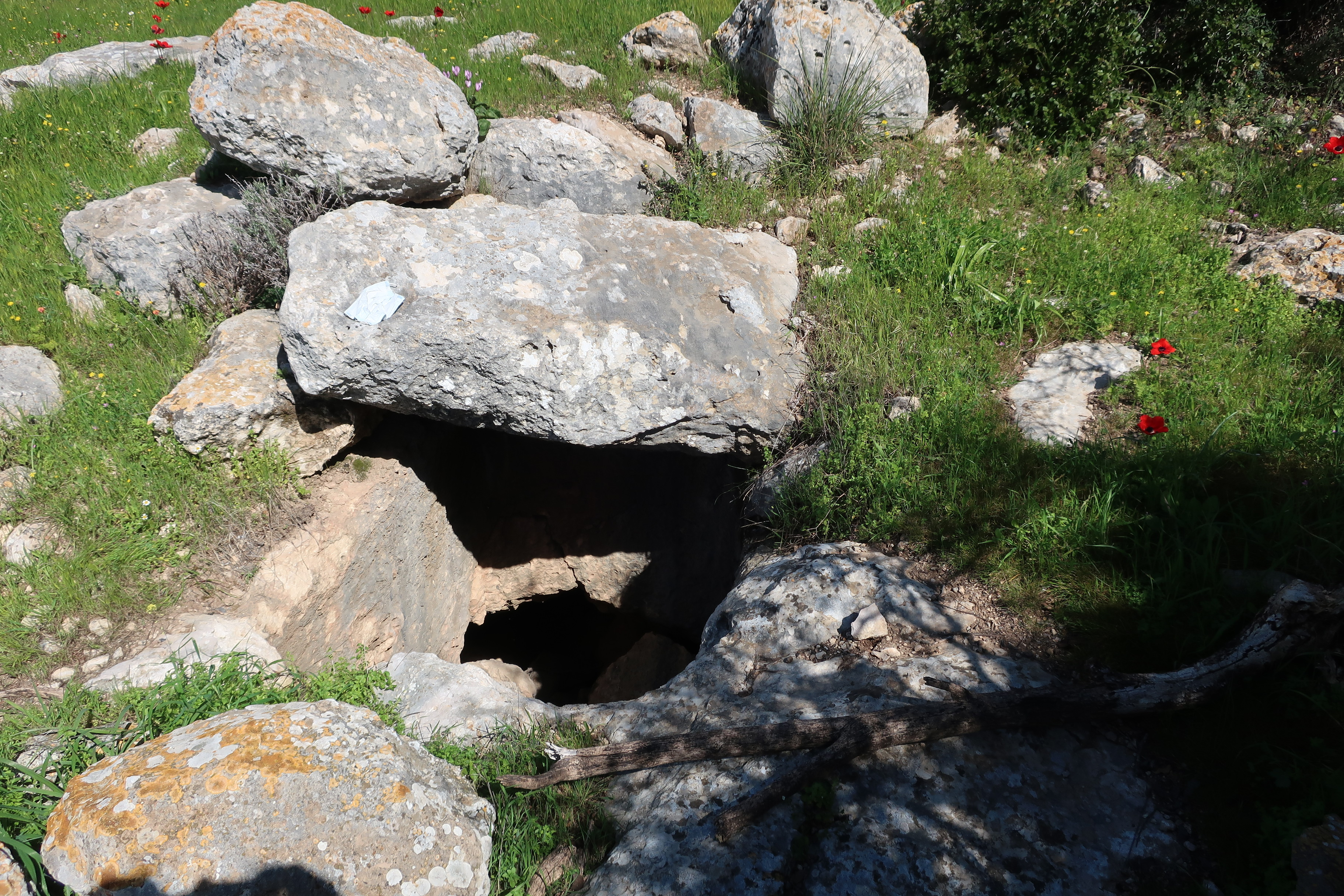
Rock-cut tomb

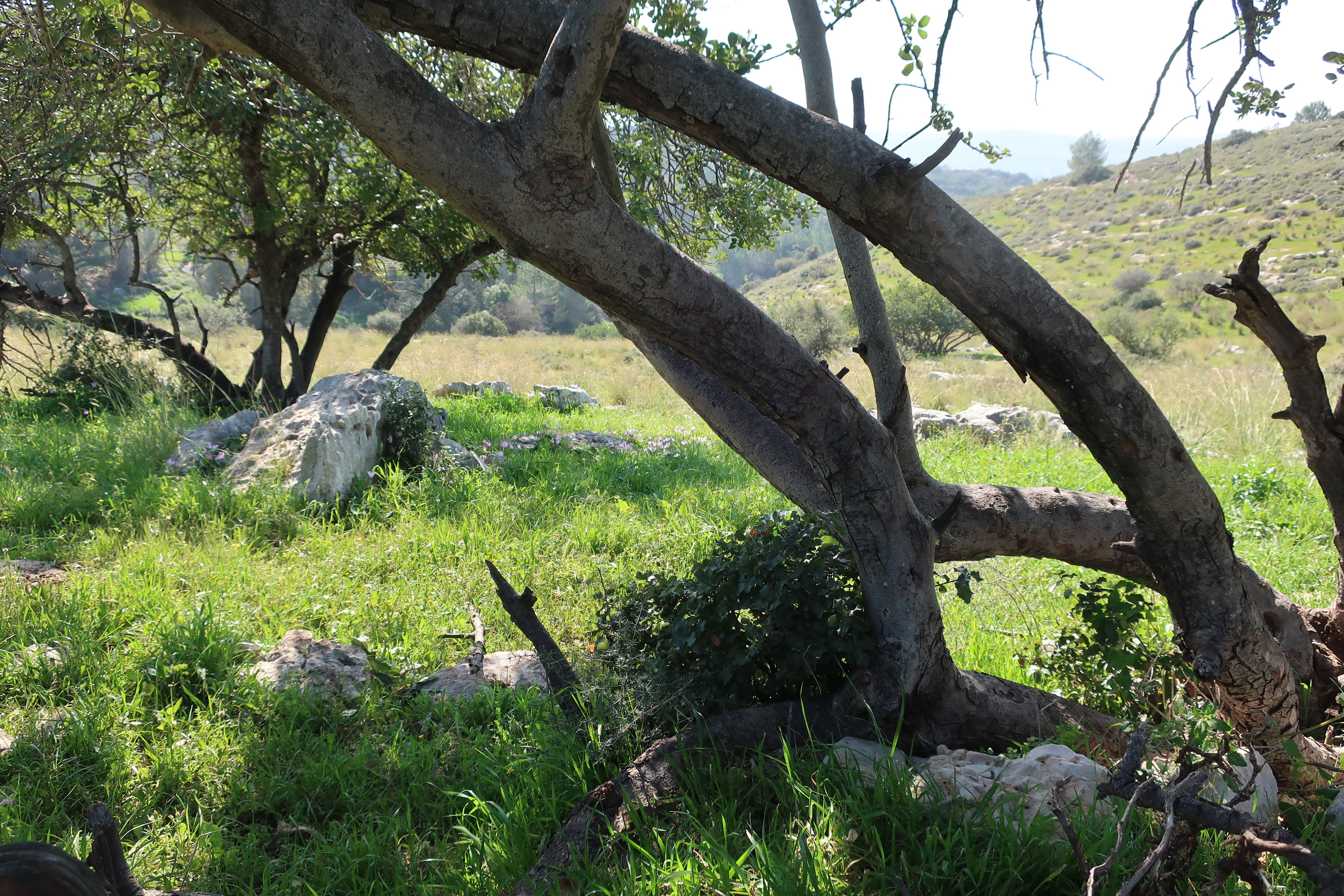
Dale near the Umm er Rus ruin

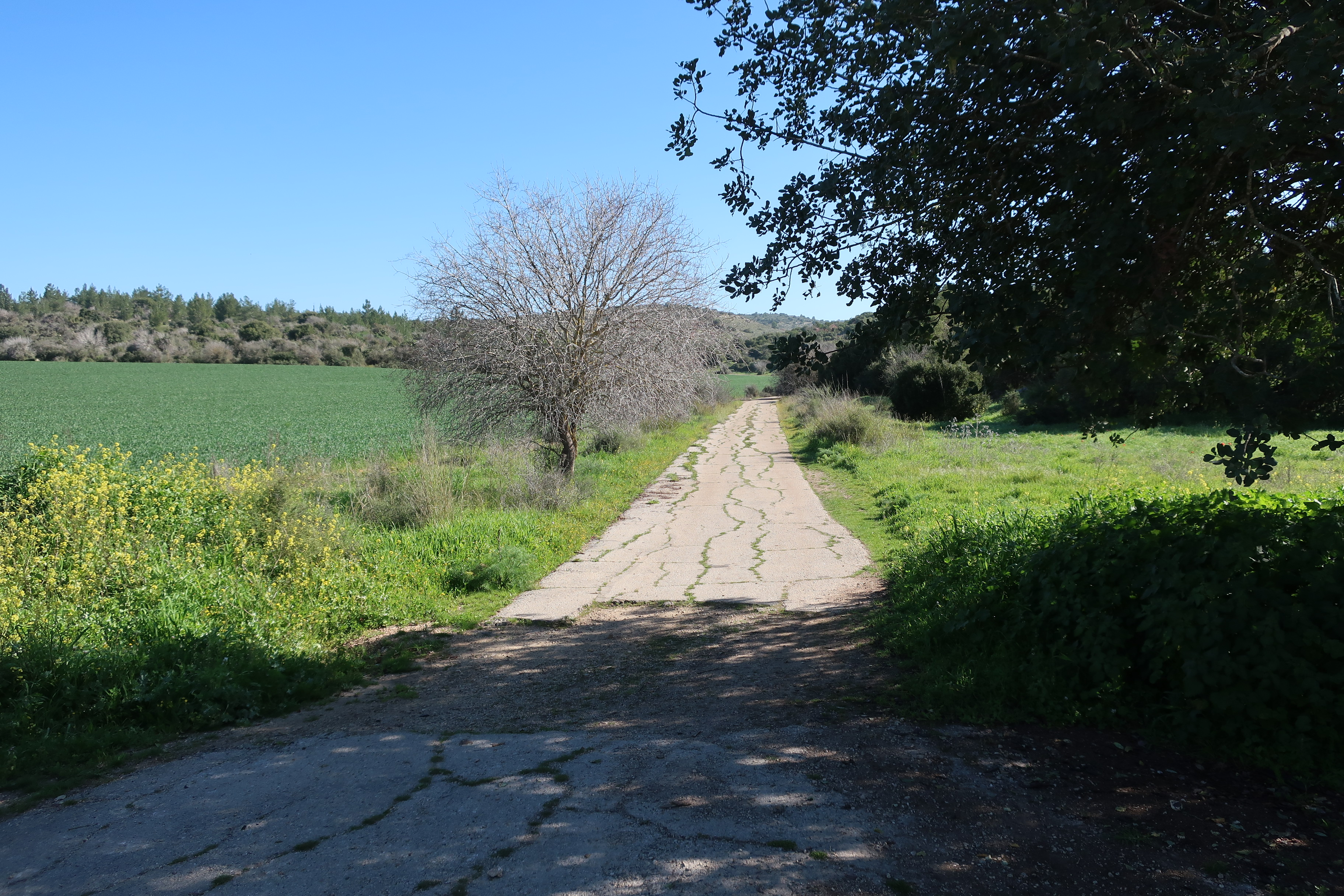
Road leading to ancient ruin (Khallat ez-Zeituna)

== Bibliography ==
- Conder, C.R.; Kitchener, H.H. (1883). The Survey of Western Palestine: Memoirs of the Topography, Orography, Hydrography, and Archaeology. Vol. 3. London: Committee of the Palestine Exploration Fund.
- Gottheil, R.; Seligsohn, M. (1901). "Edom, Idumaea". The Jewish Encyclopedia. Vol. 3. Funk and Wagnalls. LCCN 16014703. Archived from the original on 2007-09-21.
- Klein, Eitan; Goldenberg, Gidon (2018). "Kh. Umm er-Rus (Horbat Bet Bad) Reconsidered: New Insights from an Underground Archaeological Survey". Revue Biblique. 125 (1). Jerusalem: École Biblique: 90–119. doi:10.2143/RBI.125.1.3284860. ISSN 2466-8583.
- Macalister, R. A. S. (1899). "A Byzantine Church at Umm er Rûs". Palestine Exploration Quarterly. 31 (3): 200–204. doi:10.1179/peq.1899.31.3.200.
- Milik, J.-T. [in French] (1953). "Une inscription et une lettre en araméen christo-palestinien". Revue Biblique (in French). 60 (4). Leuven: Peeters Publishers: 526–539. JSTOR 44091668.
- Palmer, E.H. (1881). The Survey of Western Palestine: Arabic and English Name Lists Collected During the Survey by Lieutenants Conder and Kitchener, R. E. Transliterated and Explained by E.H. Palmer. Committee of the Palestine Exploration Fund.
- Robinson, E.; Smith, E. (1841). Biblical Researches in Palestine, Mount Sinai and Arabia Petraea: A Journal of Travels in the year 1838. Vol. 2. Boston: Crocker & Brewster.
- Zissu, B. [in Hebrew]; Ganor, Amir (2007). "Khirbat Umm er-Rûs". Hadashot Arkheologiyot: Excavations and Surveys in Israel. 119. Jerusalem: Israel Antiquities Authority. JSTOR 26584460.
