= P93 =

P93 may refer to:

- HMAS Lae (P 93), a patrol boat of the Royal Australian Navy
- Papyrus 93, a biblical manuscript
- Ruger P93, a pistol
- P93, a state regional road in Latvia
