= P94 =

P94 may refer to:

- HMAS Madang (P 94), a patrol boat of the Royal Australian Navy
- Papyrus 94, a biblical manuscript
- Ruger P94, a pistol
- Scania P94, a truck
- P94, a state regional road in Latvia
