= P129 =

P129 may refer to:

- Papyrus 129, a biblical manuscript
- TCG Bandırma (P-129), a patrol boat of the Turkish Navy
- P129, a state regional road in Latvia
