= P120 =

P120 may refer to:

- P120 (protein), a cell adhesion protein
- P120C, a European rocket engine
- Boulton Paul P.120, a British research aircraft
- Brazilian corvette Amazonas
- P-120 Malakhit, a Russian anti-ship missile
- Papyrus 120, a biblical manuscript
- Yamaha P-120, a portable electronic piano
- P120, a state regional road in Latvia
