= Papyrus 97 =

- New Testament manuscript
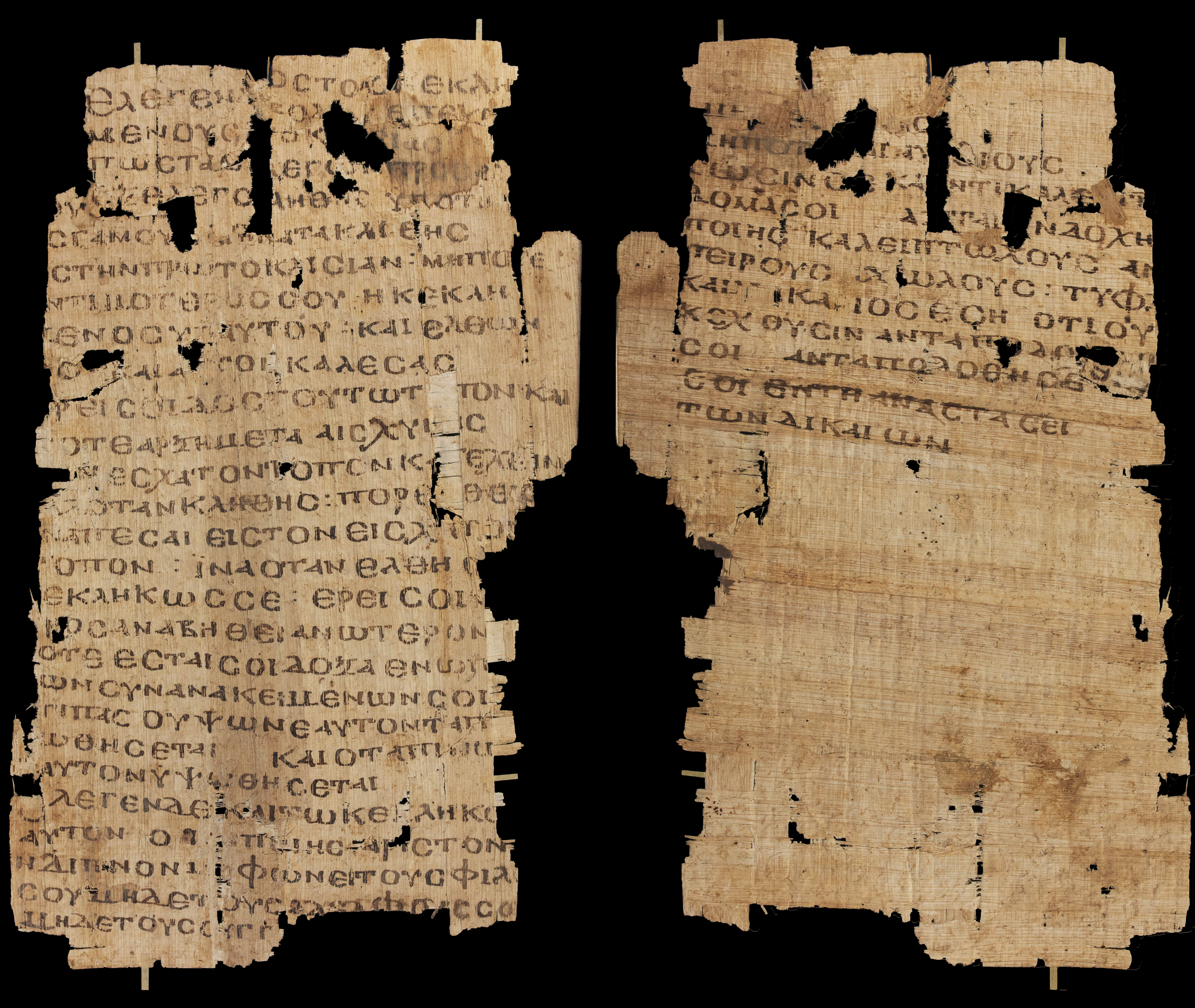
- Recto (left) — verso (right)
- Name: P. Chester Beatty XVII
- Sign: 𝔓^{97}
- Text: Luke 14 †
- Date: ca. 600
- Script: Greek
- Now at: Chester Beatty Library
- Type: Alexandrian text-type

Papyrus 97 (in the Gregory-Aland numbering), designated by 𝔓^{97}, is a copy of the New Testament in Greek. It is a papyrus manuscript of the Gospel of Luke. The manuscript has survived in a fragmentary condition.

== Description ==
The surviving texts of Luke are only verses 14:7-14. The manuscript palaeographically has been assigned to the 6th century (or 7th century).

Text

The Greek text of this manuscript is a representative of the Alexandrian text-type. It is not placed in any of Aland's Categories.

Location

The manuscript is currently housed at the Chester Beatty Library (P. Chester Beatty XVII) at Dublin.

== See also ==
- List of New Testament papyri
- Luke 14
- Coptic versions of the Bible
