= Papyrus 133 =

Papyrus manuscript

- New Testament manuscript
- Name: P. Oxy. 81 5259
- Sign: 𝔓^{133}
- Text: 1 Timothy 3:13-4:8
- Date: 3rd century
- Script: Greek
- Found: Oxyrhynchus
- Now at: University of Oxford, Sackler Library, Oxford, England
- Cite: J. Shao, The Oxyrhynchus Papyri, vol. 81, no. 5259, Egypt Exploration Society: London, England, 2016.
- Size: 16.3 x 4.5 in (27 x 13 cm)
- Type: Mixed

Papyrus 133 (designated as 𝔓^{133} in the Gregory-Aland numbering system) is what remains of an early copy of the New Testament in Greek. It is a papyrus manuscript of the First Epistle to Timothy. The text survives on several fragments of a single leaf containing parts of verses 3:13-16 and 4:1-8. The manuscript has been assigned paleographically to the middle of the 3rd century.

== Location ==
𝔓^{133} is housed at the Sackler Library (P. Oxy. 81 5259) at the University of Oxford.

== Textual variants ==
- 3:13: It reads ΤΗΝ (accusative relative pronoun) rather than the usual reading of ΤΗ (dative).
- 3:14: It omits ΠΡΟΣ ΣΕ (to you) along with F G 6 1739 1881.
- 4:6: According to the reconstruction of Shao, it contains the Alexandrian sequence χ̅υ̅ ι̅υ̅ (Christ Jesus).

== See also ==
- List of New Testament papyri
