= Papyrus 68 =

Papyrus 𝔓^{68}
- New Testament manuscript
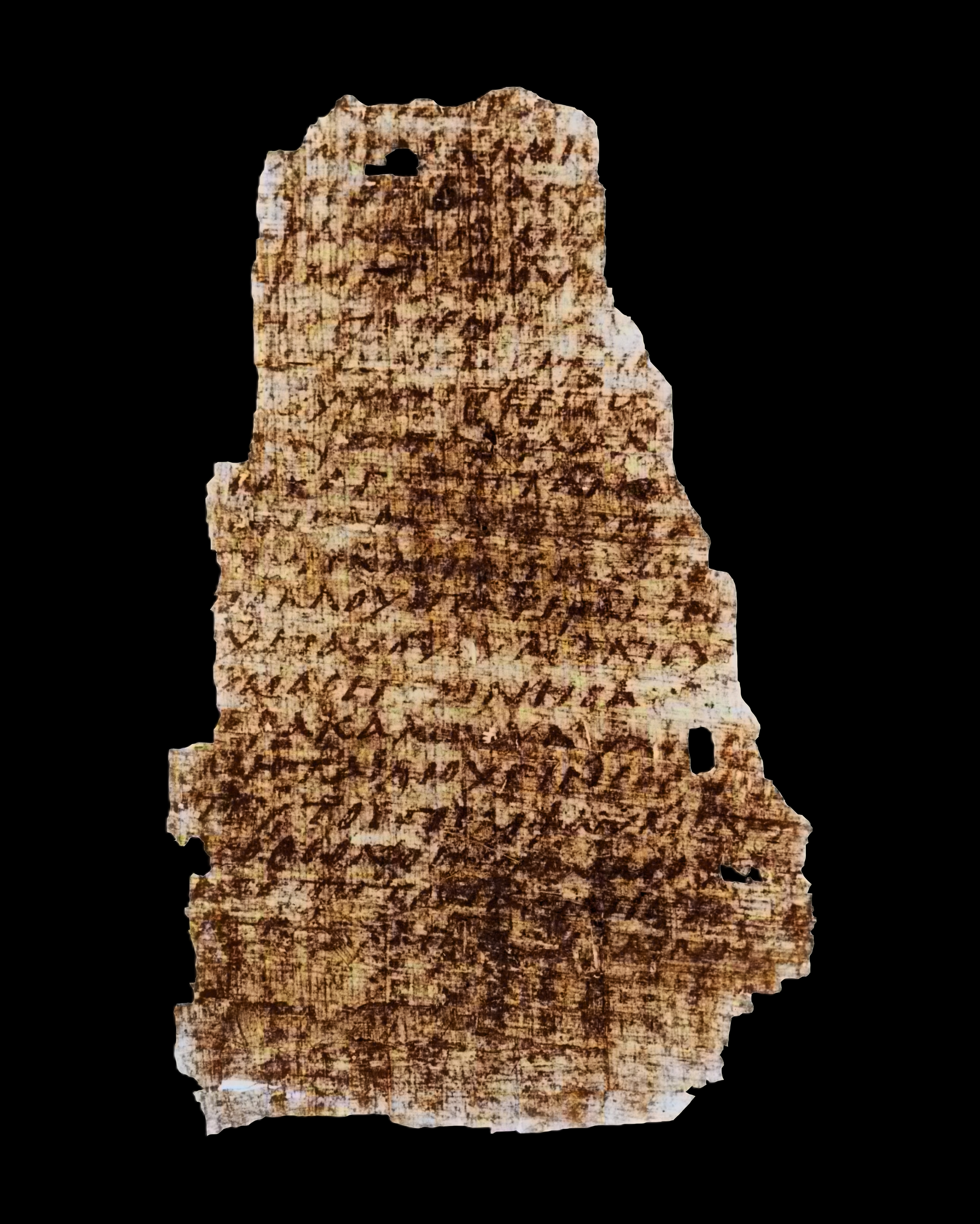
- Recto, 1 Cor 4:12-17
- Text: 1 Corinthians 4; 5 †
- Date: 7th century
- Script: Greek
- Found: Egypt
- Now at: Russian National Library
- Cite: K. Aland, Neue neutestamentliche Papyri, NTS 3 (1957), pp. 265-267
- Type: mixed
- Category: III

Papyrus 68 (in the Gregory-Aland numbering), designated by 𝔓^{68}, is a copy of the New Testament in Greek. It is a papyrus manuscript of the First Epistle to the Corinthians. The surviving texts of 1 Corinthians are verses 4:12-17; 4:19-5:3. The manuscript palaeographically has been assigned to the 7th century.

== Text ==
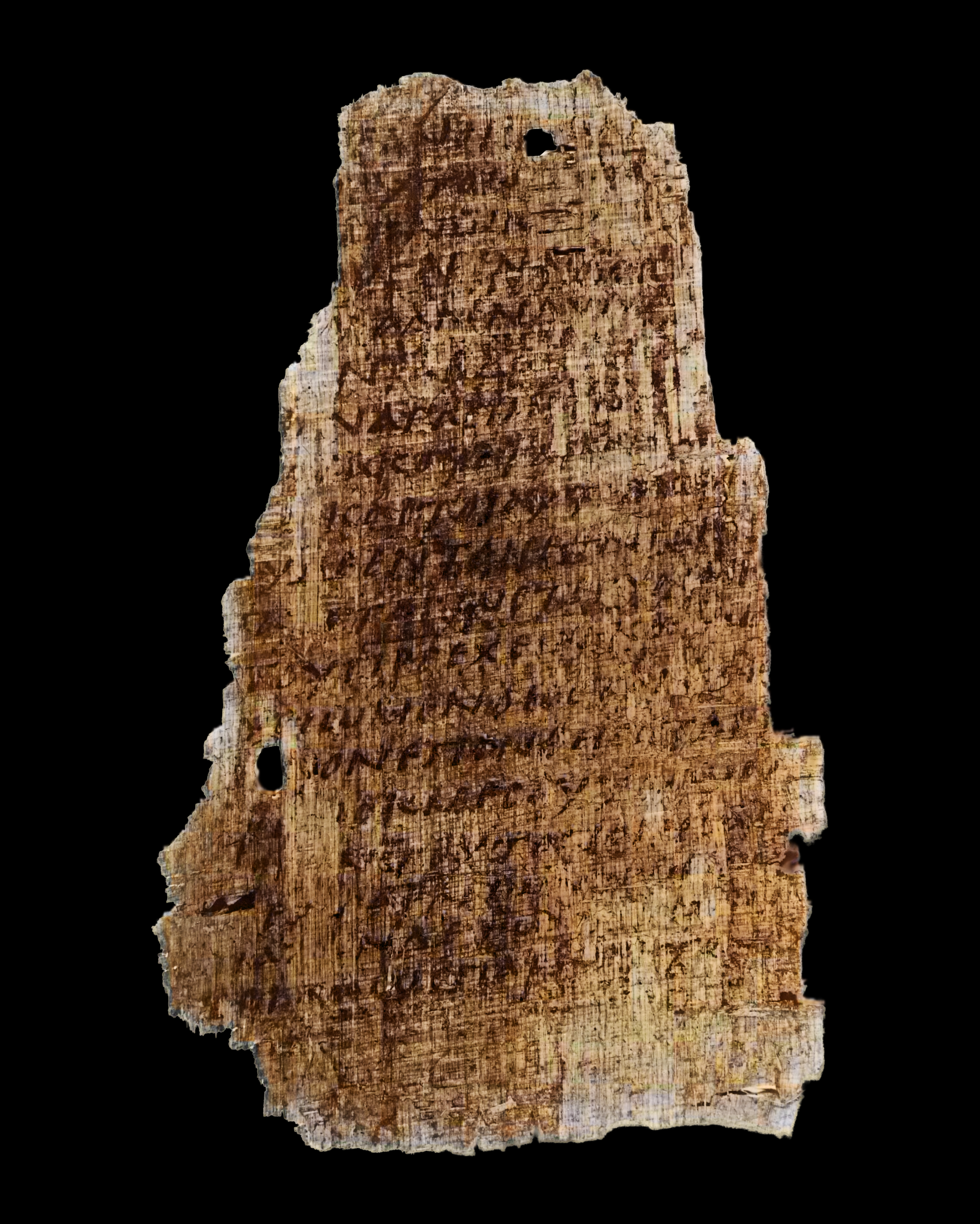
Verso, 1 Cor 4:12-5:3

The Greek text of this codex is mixed. Aland placed it in Category III.

== Location ==
It is currently housed at the Russian National Library (Gr. 258B) in Saint Petersburg.

== See also ==
- 1 Corinthians 4; 5
- List of New Testament papyri
