= Papyrus 14 =

Early copy of the New Testament in Greek

Papyrus 𝔓^{14}
- New Testament manuscript
- Text: 1 Corinthians 1–3 †
- Date: 6th century
- Script: Greek
- Found: Mount Sinai, Rendel Harris
- Now at: Saint Catherine's Monastery
- Cite: James Rendel Harris, Biblical Fragments from Mount Sinai I, (London 1890), pp. 54-56
- Type: Alexandrian text-type
- Category: II

Papyrus 14 (in the Gregory-Aland numbering), α 1036 (in the Soden's numbering), signed by 𝔓^{14}, is an early copy of the New Testament in Greek. It is a papyrus manuscript written in form of codex. The manuscript palaeographically has been assigned to the 5th century.

== Description ==
The manuscript contains the text of the First Epistle to the Corinthians (1:25–27; 2:6–8; 3:8–10; 3:19–20). The manuscript is written in 1 column per page.

The Greek text of this codex is a representative of the Alexandrian text-type. Aland placed it in Category II.

It was discovered in Saint Catherine's Monastery on Mount Sinai in Egypt by J. Rendel Harris, who published its text in 1890. It was also examined by Schofield.

The manuscript currently is housed at the Saint Catherine's Monastery (Harris 14).

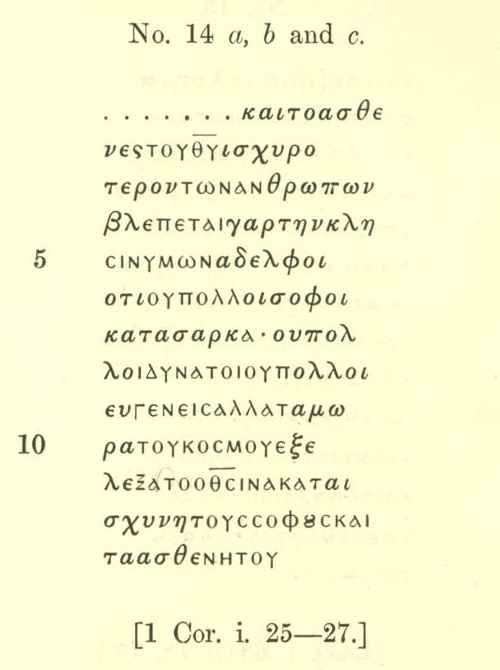
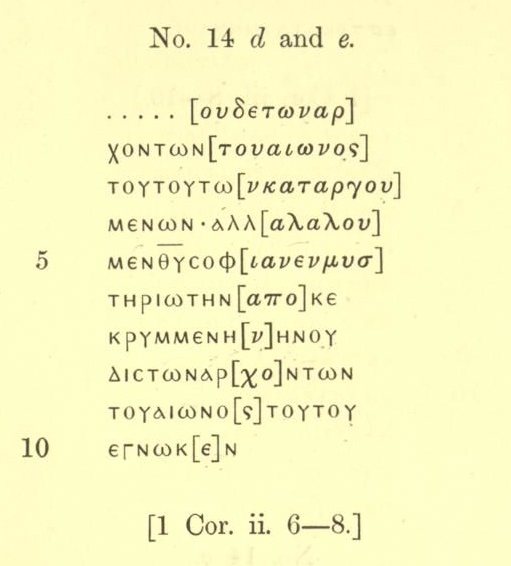
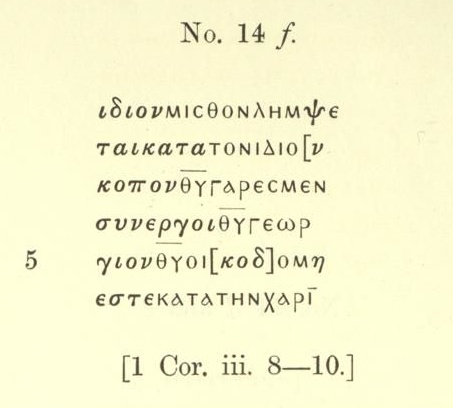
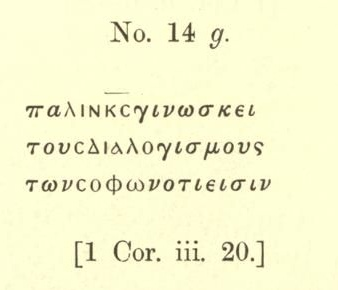
Papyrus 14 as published by Harris in 1890

== See also ==
- List of New Testament papyri
- Papyrus 11
