= Papyrus 139 =

Papyrus manuscript

- New Testament manuscript
- Name: P. Oxy. 83 5347
- Sign: 𝔓^{139}
- Text: Philemon 1:6-8 (recto); 18-20 (verso).
- Date: 4th century
- Script: Greek
- Found: Oxyrhynchus
- Now at: University of Oxford, Sackler Library, Oxford, England
- Cite: Parsons, Peter John and Nikos Gonis and W E H Cockle, The Oxyrhynchus Papyri, vol. 83, no. 5347, Egypt Exploration Society: London, England, 2018.
- Size: 13.2 x 21 cm
- Type: Alexandrian

Papyrus 139 (designated as 𝔓^{139} in the Gregory-Aland numbering system) is a small surviving portion of a handwritten copy of part of the New Testament in Greek. It is a papyrus manuscript of Philemon. The text survives on a single fragment of a codex, the recto containing about the last half of ten lines of a single column of a page, and the verso containing about the first half of nine lines of the next page. The manuscript has been assigned paleographically to the fourth century.

== Location ==
𝔓^{139} is housed at the Sackler Library at the University of Oxford in Oxford, England.

== Textual Variants ==
- v. 6 According to the reconstruction of Parsons, what is missing from the end of the first line of the recto is the untranslated article του, found in 01 and most manuscripts of Philemon; it is absent in 𝔓^{61} 02 04 048 33 629, while ƒ1739 reads ἡ instead. Parsons then reconstructs the next line as beginning εν] υμειν (in you) supported by 𝔓^{61} 01 10 12 025 075 and several minuscule clusters such as ƒ1379, although either του, ἡ, or εν could have fit in the lacuna. 02 reads εν ημιν (in us), as do 04 06 018 019 044 048vid 0150 and most other manuscripts of Philemon.
- v. 7 According to the reconstruction of Parsons, 𝔓^{139} reads χαραν γαρ πολλην εσχον και παρακλησιν (for I had great joy and encouragement) with 02 04, as opposed to the readings χαραν γαρ πολλην εσχον (for I had great joy) of 01 and χαριν γαρ εχομεν πολλην και παρακλησιν (for we have great favor and encouragement) of most manuscripts of Philemon.
- v. 18 According to the reconstruction of Parsons, 𝔓^{139} reads οφειλετο (was owing), as opposed to the readings οφιλει of 01 and 02, and οφειλει of 04 (both of which mean "is owing"). "Is owing" is the meaning of all manuscripts of Philemon without an unusual reading here.
- v. 19 The word αυτον (him) has been corrected with a supralineal epsilon to yield the unusual reading εαυτον (himself), as opposed to the standard reading σεαυτον (yourself).

== See also ==
- List of New Testament papyri
