= Papyrus 15 =

Papyrus 𝔓^{15}
- New Testament manuscript
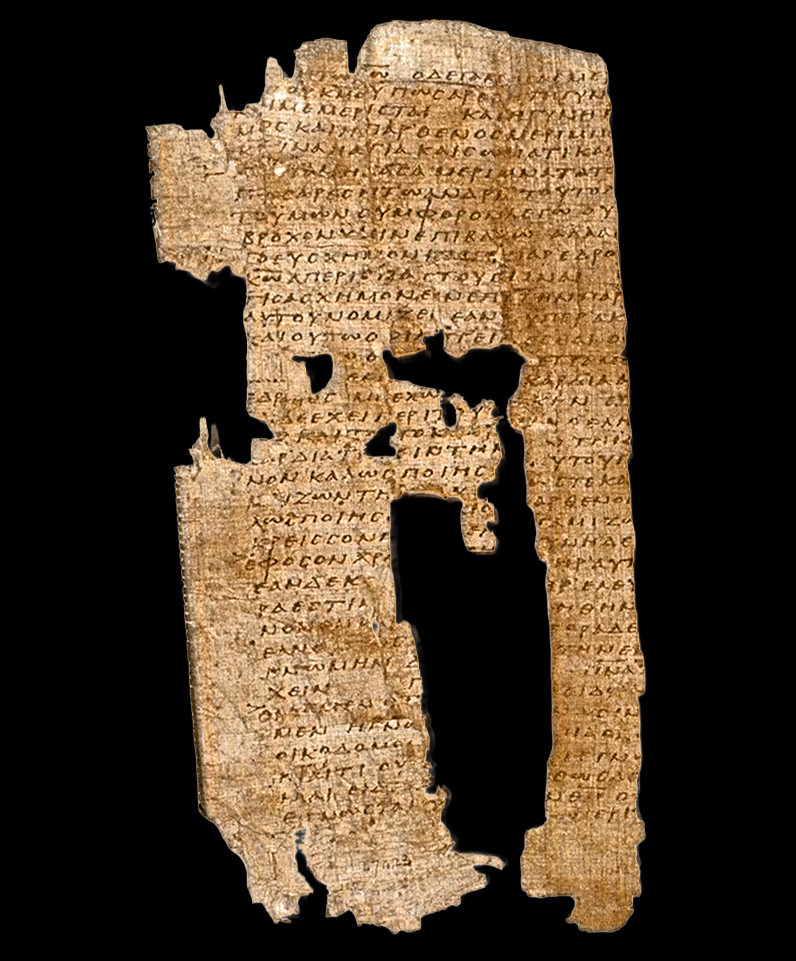
- Name: P. Oxy. 1008
- Text: 1 Corinthians 7–8 †
- Date: 3rd century
- Script: Greek
- Found: Egypt
- Now at: Egyptian Museum
- Cite: B. P. Grenfell & A. S. Hunt, The Oxyrhynchus Papyri VII, (London 1910), pp. 4-8
- Size: 26.5 x 14 cm
- Type: Alexandrian text-type
- Category: I

Papyrus 15 (in the Gregory-Aland numbering), designated as 𝔓^{15}, is an early copy of the New Testament in Greek. It was part of a papyrus manuscript containing the Pauline letters. It contains 1 Corinthians 7:18–8:4. The manuscript has been palaeographically assigned either to the 3rd century or the fourth century.

== Description ==
The manuscript is written in a competent literary hand that is sometimes described as belonging to the "severe style." There are about 37-38 lines per page. 𝔓^{15} and 𝔓^{16} were almost certainly part of the same manuscript.

The Greek text of this codex is probably a representative of the Alexandrian text-type, however the text is too brief to determine this exactly. Aland placed it in Category I. It is currently housed at the Bibliotheca Alexandrina (BAAM 0543) in Alexandria.

== See also ==
- List of New Testament papyri
