= Papyrus 123 =

- New Testament manuscript
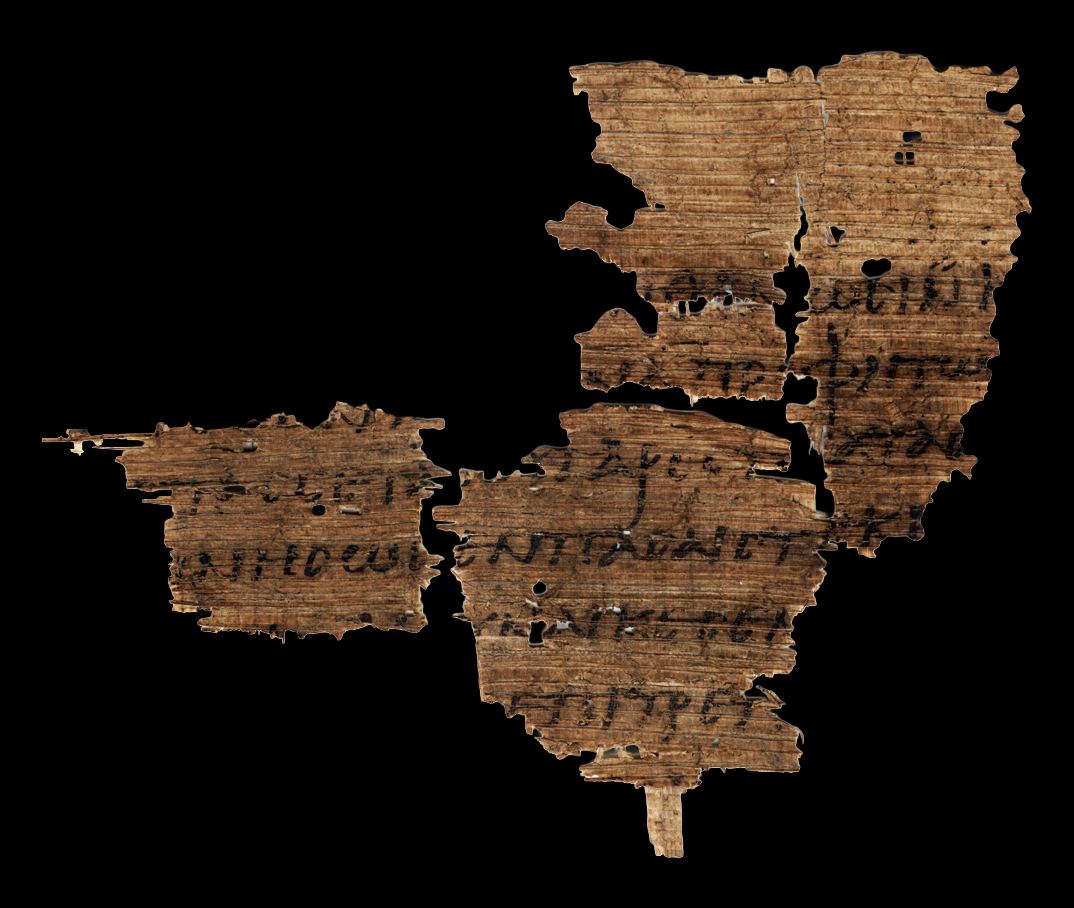
- Recto, 1 Corinthians 14:31-34
- Name: P. Oxy. 4844
- Sign: 𝔓^{123}
- Text: 1 Corinthians 14:31-34; 15:3-6
- Date: 4th century
- Script: Greek
- Found: Oxyrhynchus, Egypt
- Now at: Sackler Library
- Cite: J. David Thomas
- Size: 7.5 × 6.5 cm
- Type: Alexandrian (?)
- Category: -

Papyrus 123 (in the Gregory-Aland numbering), designated by 𝔓^{123}, is an early copy of the New Testament in Greek. It is a papyrus manuscript of the First Epistle to the Corinthians.

== Description ==
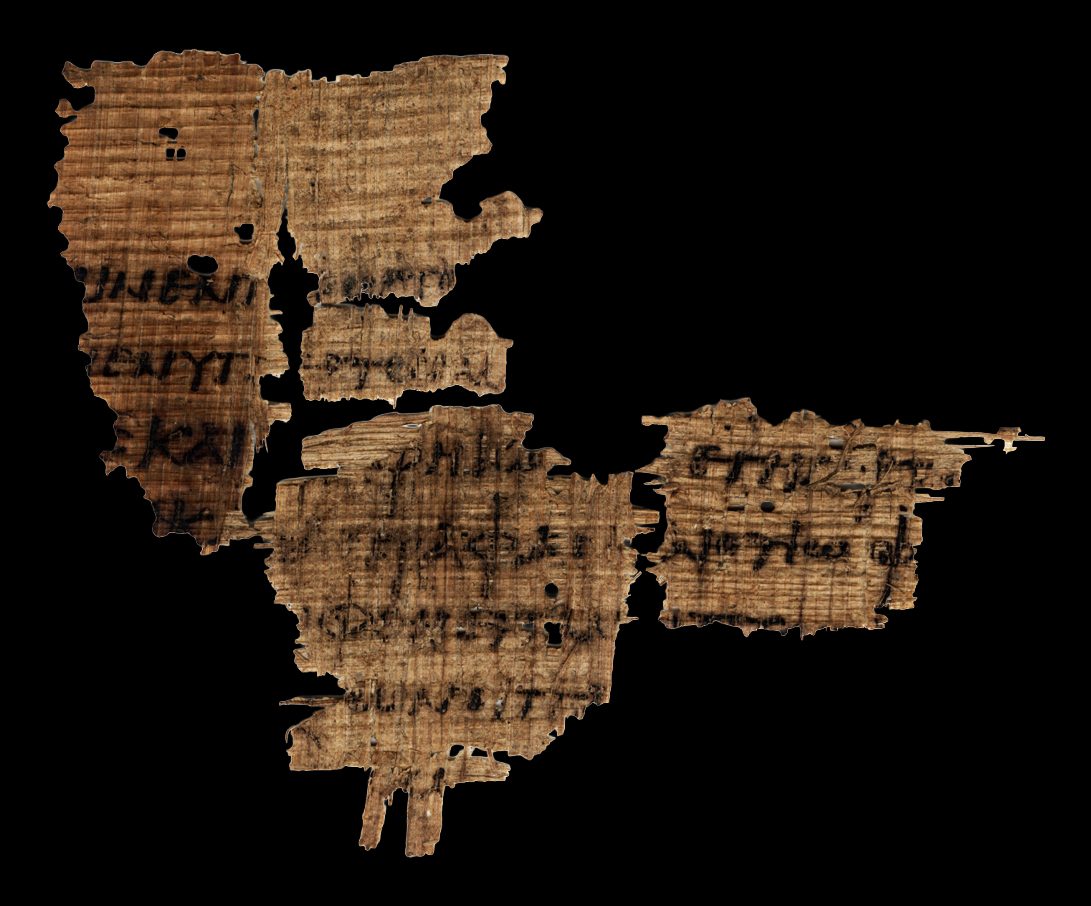
Verso, 1 Corinthians 15:3-6

To the present day survived only pieces from one leaf. The surviving texts of 1 Corinthians are verses 14:31-34; 15:3-6, they are in a fragmentary condition. The manuscript paleographically has been assigned to the 4th century (INTF).

Text

Recto

μα]ν̣θανωσιν κ[αι παντες
παρ]α̣κ̣α̣λ̣ω̣ντ̣[αι και] π̣να προ̣φητων̣ [προφηταις
υ]π̣ο̣τασσεται̣ ο̣υ γαρ εστι[ν α]κ̣ατασ[ιας ο θς
αλλ ειρ]η̣νες οω εν πασαις τα[ις] εκκ̣[λησιας
των αγι]ω̣ν̣ α̣ι̣ γ̣υναικες εν [ταις εκκλησιαις
σιγατωσαν ου γα]ρ̣ επιτρεπ̣[εται αυταις λαλειν
]...[

Verso

υ]μ̣ιν εν π̣ρωτοι̣[ς ο και παρελαβον οτι
χς απεθα]ν̣εν υπερ των α̣[μαρτιων ημων κατα
τας γραφ]α̣ς και ο̣[τ]ι̣ ε̣τ̣α̣φη και̣ [οτι] εγηγε̣ρτα̣[ι τη
ημερα τη τριτ]η̣ κα̣[τα] τ̣ας̣ γραφας κ̣αι οτι ωφ[θη κηφα
ειτα τοις δωδεκα επειτα] ω̣φθη επανω̣ πε̣ν̣[τ]α̣
κοσιοις αδελφοις εφαπαξ ε]ξ̣ ων οι πλ̣[ειονες
μενουσιν εως αρτι τινες δε εκο]ι̣μ[ηθησαν

The Greek text of this codex probably is a representative of the Alexandrian text-type. It was published by J. David Thomas in 2008.

== Location ==
The manuscript currently is housed at the Papyrology Rooms of the Sackler Library at Oxford with the shelf number P. Oxy. 4844.

== See also ==
- 1 Corinthians 14, 15
- List of New Testament papyri
- Oxyrhynchus Papyri
- Biblical manuscript
