= Papyrus 125 =

- New Testament manuscript
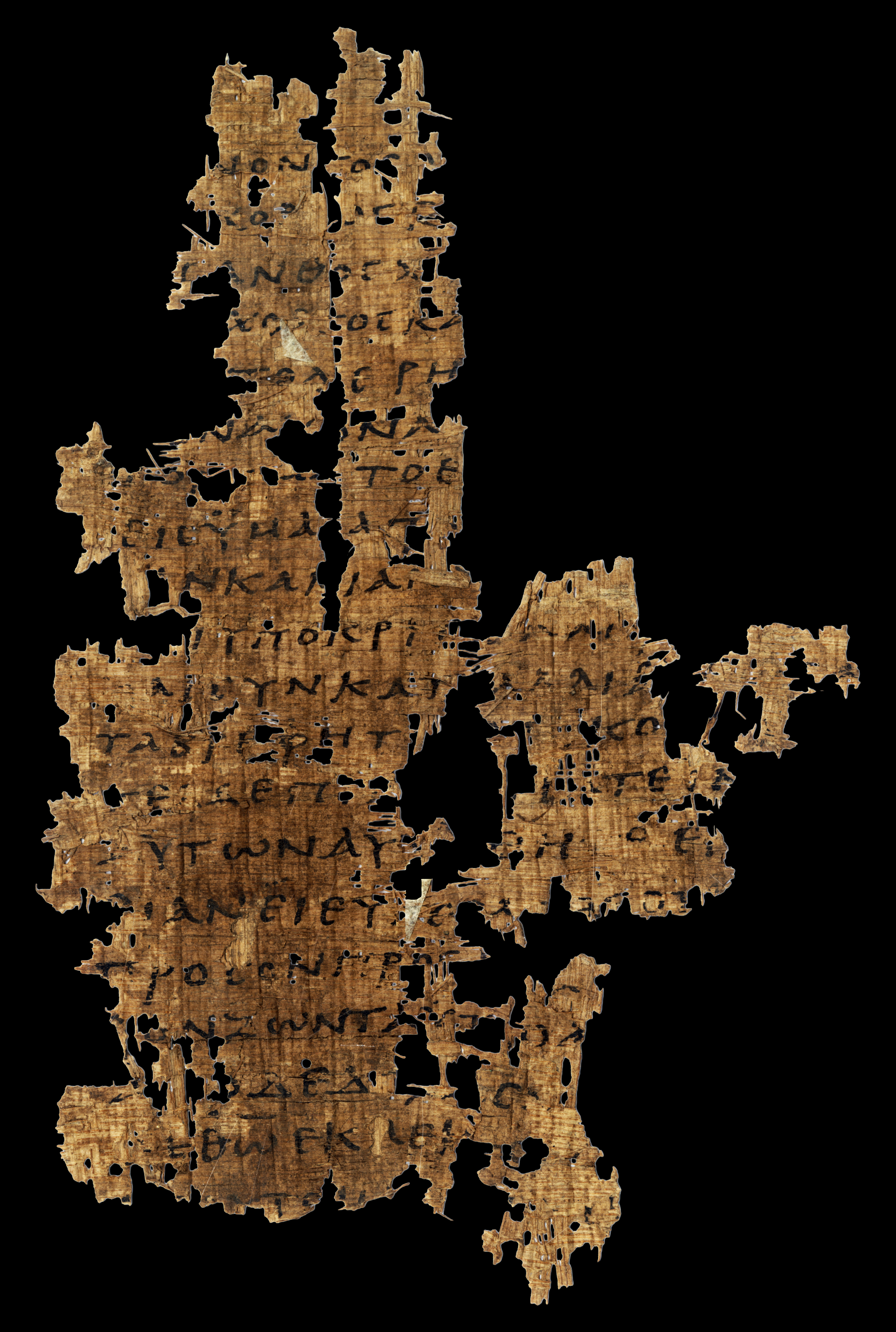
- Recto, 1 Peter 1:23-2:5
- Name: P. Oxy. 4934
- Sign: 𝔓^{125}
- Text: 1 Peter 1:23-2:5; 7-12
- Date: 3rd/4th century
- Script: Greek
- Found: Oxyrhynchus, Egypt
- Now at: Sackler Library
- Cite: D. Obdink (2009)
- Size: 15 cm by 8.5 cm
- Type: Alexandrian (?)
- Category: none

Papyrus 125, also known as P. Oxy. 4934, is an early copy of the New Testament in Greek. It is a papyrus manuscript of the First Epistle of Peter in a fragmentary condition. It is designated by the siglum 𝔓^{125} in the Gregory-Aland numbering of New Testament manuscripts. Using the study of comparative writing styles (palaeography), it has been dated to the late 3rd or early 4th century.

== Description ==
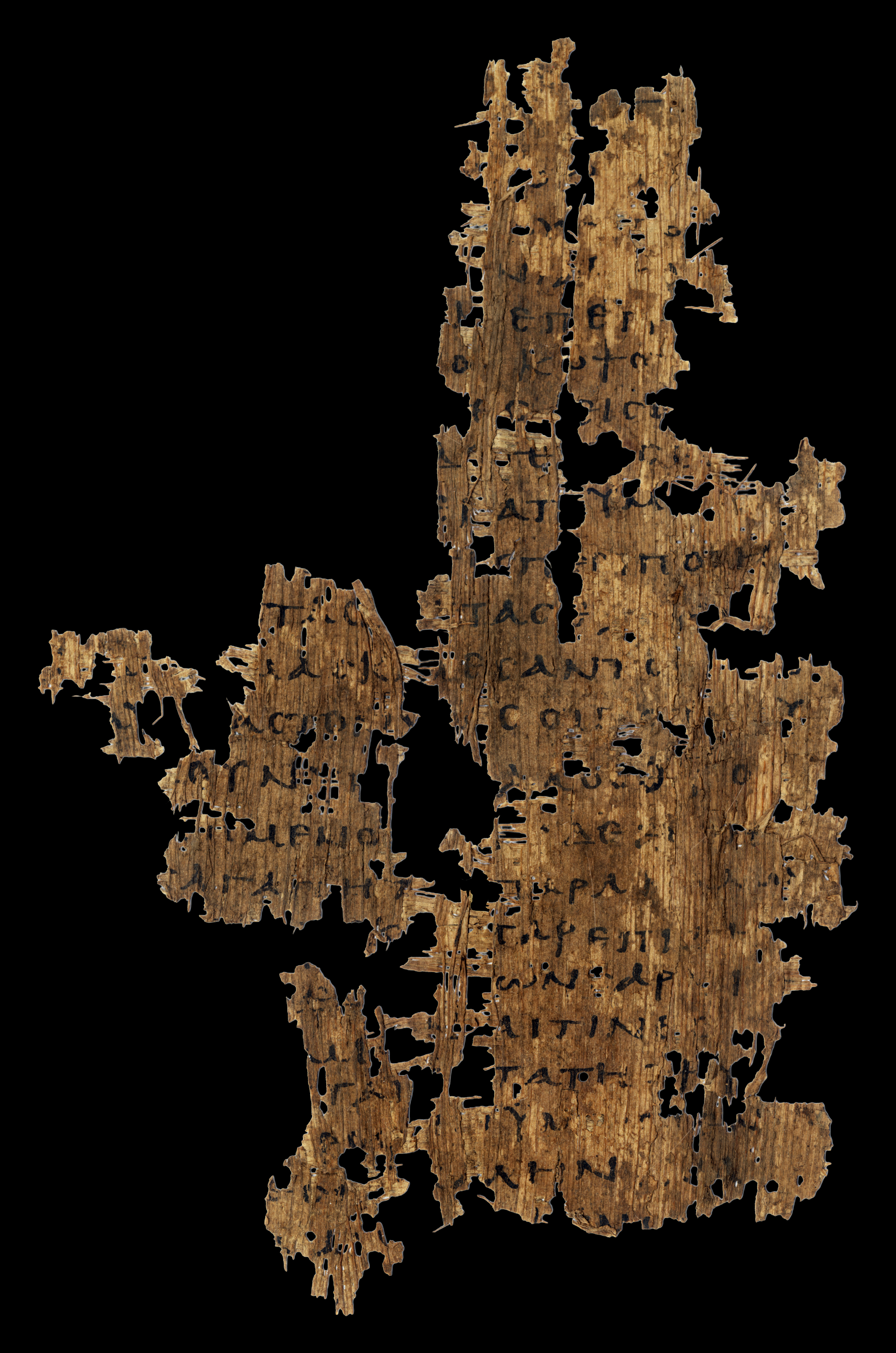
Verso, 1 Peter 2:9-12

The original manuscript was likely a codex (precursor to the modern book format), of which only pieces from one leaf of the codex have survived to the present day. The only verses extant are 1 Peter 1:23-25; 2:1-4. The original text was written in one column per page, with around 30 lines per page. The graphical style of writing has been described as belonging to the "severe style". The Greek text of this codex is probably a representative of the Alexandrian text-type.

In 1 Peter 2:3, it has an interesting reading (shared with another early Papyrus 𝔓^{72}) of having the traditional χρηστὸς ὁ κύριος (The Lord is good) as χριστὸς ὁ κύριος (Christ is Lord), with χριστὸς written as a nomen sacrum (Χ̅Ρ̅Σ̅). This wordplay appears quite early in Christian tradition, and is also seen in Roman misunderstandings of referring to Chrestus and Chrestianity instead of Christus and Christianity.

== History ==
The earliest history of the manuscript is unknown. It was discovered during one of the digs at the site of Oxyrhynchus (Al-Bahnasa) in Egypt.

It was published by papyrologist Juan Chapa in the 73rd volume of The Oxyrhynchus Papyri in 2009. The manuscript is currently housed in the Papyrology Rooms of the Sackler Library at Oxford with the shelf number P. Oxy. 4934.

== See also ==
- List of New Testament papyri
- Oxyrhynchus Papyri
- Biblical manuscript
