= Papyrus 124 =

- New Testament manuscript
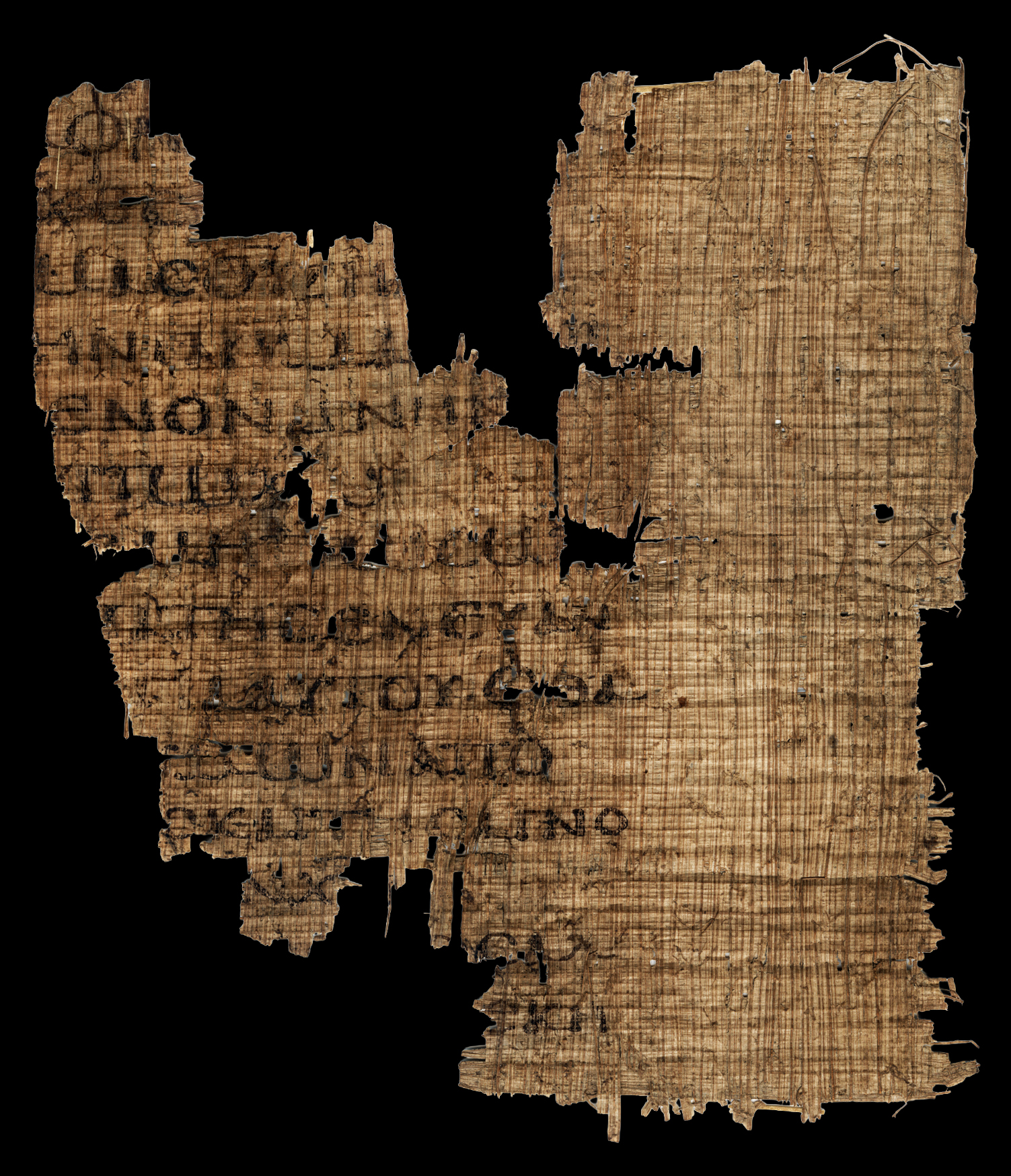
- Recto, 2 Corinthians 11:1-4
- Name: P. Oxy. 4845
- Sign: 𝔓^{124}
- Text: 2 Corinthians 11:1-4; 6-9
- Date: 6th century
- Script: Greek
- Found: Oxyrhynchus, Egypt
- Now at: Sackler Library
- Cite: J. David Thomas (2008)
- Size: 14.5 cm by 13.5 cm
- Type: Alexandrian (?)
- Category: none

Papyrus 124 (in the Gregory-Aland numbering), designated by 𝔓^{124}, is a copy of the New Testament in Greek. It is a papyrus manuscript of the Second Epistle to the Corinthians.

== Description ==
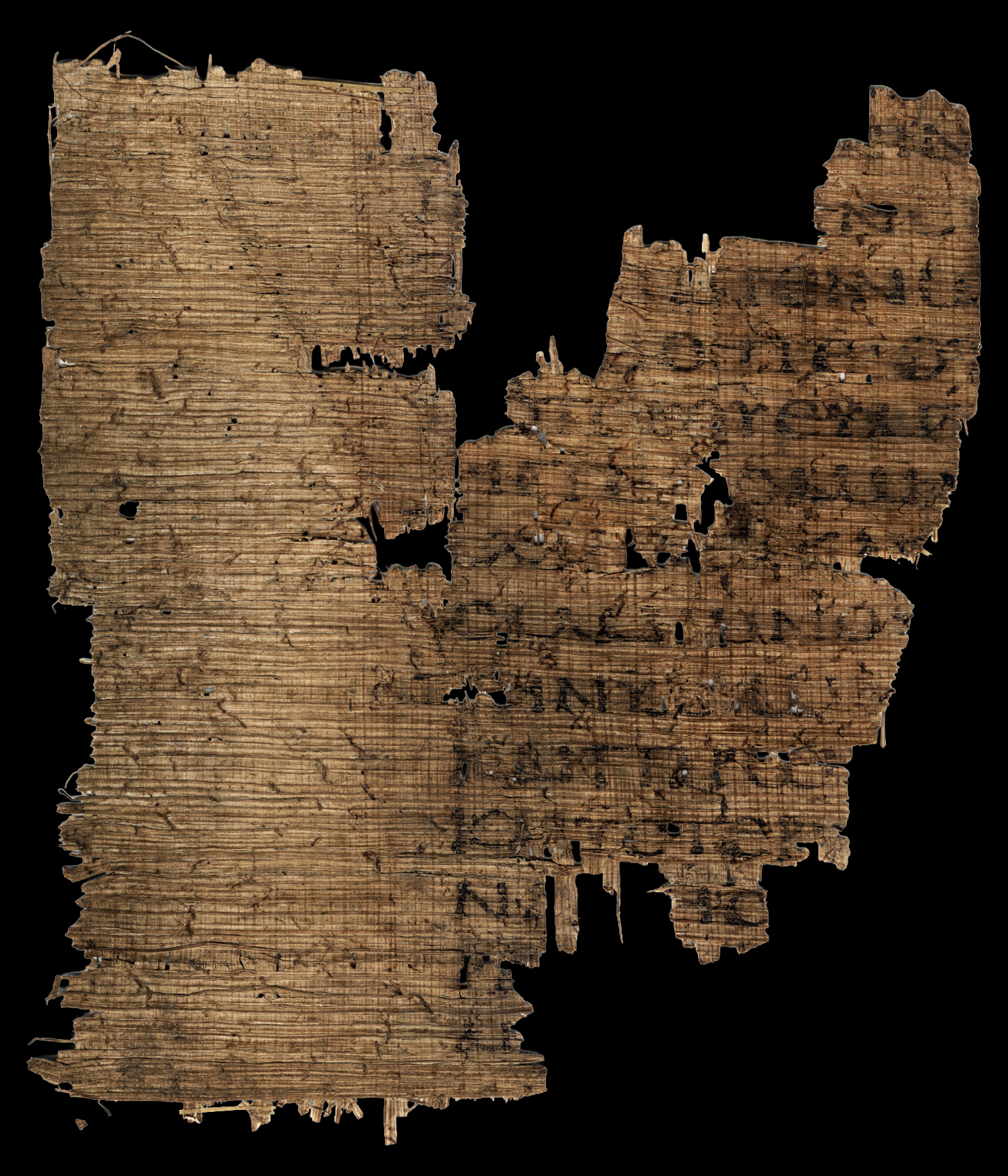
Verso, 2 Corinthians 11:6-9

To the present day survived only pieces from one leaf. The surviving texts of 2 Corinthians are verses 11:1-4; 6–9, they are in a fragmentary condition. The manuscript palaeographically had been assigned to the 6th century (INTF). Written in one column per page, 14 lines per page.

The Greek text of this codex probably is a representative of the Alexandrian text-type. It was published by J. David Thomas in 2008.

== Location ==
The manuscript currently is housed at the Papyrology Rooms of the Sackler Library at Oxford with the shelf number P. Oxy. 4845.

== See also ==
- List of New Testament papyri
- Oxyrhynchus Papyri
- Biblical manuscript
