= Papyrus 138 =

Papyrus manuscript

- New Testament manuscript
- Name: P. Oxy 5346
- Sign: 𝔓^{138}
- Text: Luke 13:13–17, 25–30
- Date: 3rd century
- Script: Greek
- Found: Oxyrhynchus
- Now at: University of Oxford, Sackler Library, Oxford, England
- Cite: Parsons, Peter John and Nikos Gonis and W E H Cockle, The Oxyrhynchus Papyri, vol. 83, no. 5346, Egypt Exploration Society: London, England, 2018.
- Type: Alexandrian

Papyrus 138 (designated as 𝔓^{138} in the Gregory-Aland numbering system) is an early copy of the New Testament in Greek. It is a papyrus manuscript of Luke. The text survives on fragments from one edge of a single leaf containing parts of verses 13:13–17 on the front and 13:25-30 on the back. The manuscript has been assigned paleographically to the 3rd century.

== Location ==
𝔓^{138} is housed at the Sackler Library (P. Oxy 5346) at the University of Oxford.

== Textual variant ==
In Luke 13:29, 𝔓^{138} reads απο immediately preceding the beginning of βορρα, as do the Alexandrian manuscripts 𝔓^{75} and 070. But according to the reconstruction of Parsons based on line-spacing, it lacks και before απο.

== See also ==
- List of New Testament papyri
