= Papyrus 132 =

Papyrus manuscript

- New Testament manuscript
- Name: P. Oxy. 81 5258
- Sign: 𝔓^{132}
- Text: Ephesians 3:21-4:2, 14-16
- Date: 3rd century
- Script: Greek
- Found: Oxyrhynchus
- Now at: University of Oxford, Sackler Library, Oxford, England
- Cite: C.S. Smith, The Oxyrhynchus Papyri, vol. 81, no. 5258, Egypt Exploration Society: London, England, 2016.
- Size: 20 x 13.5 cm
- Type: Mixed

Papyrus 132 (designated as 𝔓^{132} in the Gregory-Aland numbering system) is an early copy of the New Testament in Greek. It is a papyrus manuscript of the Epistle to the Ephesians. The text survives on a single fragment with four to five lines containing a few letters each of 3:21, 4:1, and 4:2 on one side, and of 4:14,15, and 16 on the other. The manuscript has been assigned paleographically to the third or fourth century.

== Location ==
𝔓^{132} is housed at the Sackler Library (P. Oxy. 81 5258) at the University of Oxford.

== Textual variants ==
The text is very fragmented, but several textual variants can nonetheless be identified by reconstructing the text in comparison with other ancient manuscripts of Ephesians, and by utilizing letter-spacing to identify character sequences which are likely missing.

- 3:21 - The character sequence ια εν indicates that the Alexandrian reading και (and), whose presence is directly supported by 𝔓^{46} 01 02 03 04 0278 6 33 81 104* 365 614 1175 1241supp 1739 1881, and indirectly by 06 10 12, is absent in 𝔓^{132}.
- 4:15 - According to the reconstruction of Smith, 𝔓^{132} contains the sequence ος εστιν Χ̅ς̅ (which is Christ). The usual reading of η κεφαλη ο (the head, the) following ος εστιν, was apparently omitted.

== See also ==
- List of New Testament papyri
