= List of New Testament papyri =

Ancient religious text

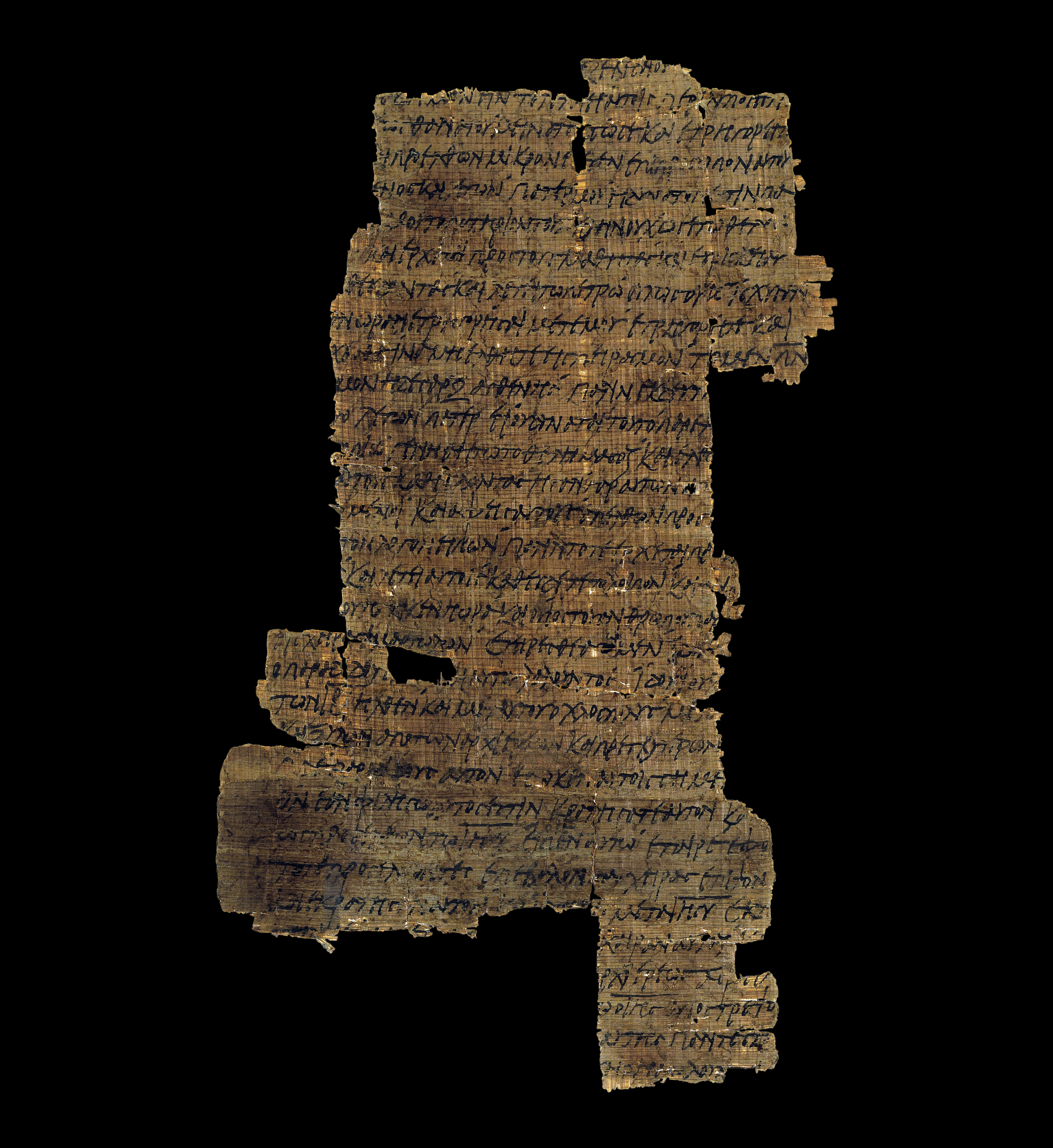
Verso of papyrus 𝔓^{37}

A New Testament papyrus is a copy of a portion of the New Testament made on papyrus. To date, over 140 such papyri are known. In general, they are considered the earliest witnesses to the original text of the New Testament.

This elite status among New Testament manuscripts only began in the 20th century. The grouping was first introduced by Caspar René Gregory, who assigned papyri texts the Blackletter character 𝔓 followed by a superscript number. This number refers not to the age of the papyrus, but to the order in which it was registered. Before 1900, only 9 papyri manuscripts were known, and only one had been cited in a critical apparatus (𝔓^{11} by Constantin von Tischendorf). These 9 papyri were just single fragments, except for 𝔓^{15}, which consisted of a single whole leaf. The discoveries of the 20th century brought about the earliest known New Testament manuscript fragments. Kenyon in 1912 knew 14 papyri, Aland in his first edition of Kurzgefasste... in 1963 enumerated 76 papyri, in 1989 there were 96 known papyri, and in 2008 124 papyri. As of 2021, a total of 141 papyri are known, although some of the numbers issued were later deemed to be fragments of the same original manuscript.

Among the most important are the Chester Beatty Papyri: 𝔓^{45}, which contains the Gospels and Acts; 𝔓^{46}, which contains the Pauline epistles; and 𝔓^{47}, which contains the Book of Revelation. All of these are thought to date from sometime in the third century.

Also significant are the Bodmer Papyri: 𝔓^{66}, which contains the Gospel of John; and 𝔓^{75}, which contains the Gospels of Luke and John. These early manuscripts are more complete, allowing scholars to better examine their textual character.

Not all of the manuscripts are simply New Testament texts: 𝔓^{59}, 𝔓^{60}, 𝔓^{63}, 𝔓^{80} are texts with commentaries; 𝔓^{2}, 𝔓^{3}, and 𝔓^{44} are lectionaries; 𝔓^{50}, 𝔓^{55}, and 𝔓^{78} are talismans; and 𝔓^{10}, 𝔓^{12}, 𝔓^{42}, 𝔓^{43}, 𝔓^{62}, 𝔓^{72}, and 𝔓^{99} belong to other miscellaneous texts, such as writing scraps, glossaries, or songs.

Every papyrus is cited in Nestle-Aland Novum Testamentum Graece.

== List of all registered New Testament papyri ==
- The P-numbers are the standard system of Gregory-Aland.
- Dates are estimated to the year range shown.
- Content is given to the nearest chapter; verses are sometimes listed. Thus, many of the papyri are small fragments, not whole chapters. For instance, 𝔓^{52} contains 5 verses out of the 40 verses in John chapter 18.

Manuscripts in beige rows belong to the Oxyrhynchus Papyri (𝔓^{78}, 𝔓^{90}, 𝔓^{104}, 𝔓^{115}, 𝔓^{137})
Manuscripts in light cyan rows belong to the Bodmer Papyri (𝔓^{66}, 𝔓^{72}, 𝔓^{73}, 𝔓^{74}, 𝔓^{75})
Manuscripts in light pink rows belong to the Chester Beatty Papyri (𝔓^{45}, 𝔓^{46}, 𝔓^{47}, 𝔓^{97}, 𝔓^{99})

- Digital images are referenced with direct links to the hosting web pages. The quality and accessibility of the images is as follows:

Gold color indicates high resolution color images available online.
Tan color indicates high resolution color images available locally, not online.
Light tan color indicates only a small fraction of manuscript pages with color images available online.
Light gray color indicates black/white or microfilm images available online.
Violet color indicates high resolution ultraviolet images available online.

=== Papyrus 1–50 ===
Name	Date	Content	Pages	Institution	Ref #	City, State	Country	Images
𝔓^{1}	~250	Matthew 1:1-9, 12-13, Matthew 1:14-20, 23	2 Frg	University of Pennsylvania	P. Oxy. 2; E 2746	Philadelphia; Pennsylvania	United States	PM, CSNTM, INTF
𝔓^{2}	500-600	John 12:12-15 (Greek), Luke 7:22-26, 50 (Coptic)	1 Frg	National Archaeological Museum	Inv. 7134	Florence	Italy	CSNTM, INTF
𝔓^{3}	500-700	Luke 7:36-45, 10:38-42	1 Frg	Austrian National Library	G 2323 Pap	Vienna	Austria	ANL, CSNTM, INTF
𝔓^{4}	150-300	Luke 1:58-59, 1:62-2:1, 2:6-7, 3:8-4:2, 4:29-32, 34-35, 5:3-8, 5:30-6:16	6 Frg (4 pgs)	National Library of France	Supplement Grec 1120	Paris	France	BnF, CSNTM, INTF
𝔓^{5}	200-300	John 1:23-31, 33-40 16:14-22, 16:22-30, John 20:19-20, 22-25	2 Frg	British Library	P. Oxy. 208, 1781; Papyrus 782, Papyrus 2484	London	UK	BL, CSNTM, INTF
𝔓^{6}	300-400	John 10:1-2, 4-7, 9-10, 11:1-8, 45, 46-52 (Greek); 1 Clement 1:1-26:2; John 10:1-12, 20; 13:1-2, 11-12; James 1:13-5:20 (Coptic)	15 Frg (4 pgs)	National and University Library	Pap. copt. 379. 381. 382. 384	Strasbourg	France	CSNTM, INTF
𝔓^{7}	300-500	Luke 4:1-3	1 Frg	Vernadsky National Library of Ukraine	F. 301 (KDA), 553p	Kyiv	Ukraine	INTF
𝔓^{7}	300-500	Luke 4:1-3	1 Frg	Vernadsky National Library of Ukraine	F. 301 (KDA), 553p	Kyiv	Ukraine	CSNTM
𝔓^{8}	300-400	Acts 4:31-37, 5:2-9, 6:1-6, 8-15	2	Berlin State Museums	P. 8683	Berlin	Germany	BerlPap, CSNTM, INTF
𝔓^{9}	200-300	1 John 4:11-12, 14-17	1 Frg	Houghton Library, Harvard	P. Oxy. 402; MS Gr SM3736	Cambridge; Massachusetts	United States	HL, CSNTM, INTF
𝔓^{10}	300-400	Romans 1:1-7	1 Frg	Houghton Library, Harvard	P. Oxy. 209; MS Gr SM2218	Cambridge; Massachusetts	United States	HL, CSNTM, INTF
𝔓^{11}=[𝔓^{14}]	500-600	1 Corinthians 1:17-22, 2:9-12, 14, 3:1-3, 5-6, 4:3-5:5, 7-8, 6:5-9, 11-18, -7:3-6, 10-14	17 Frg	National Library	Gr. 258A	Saint Petersburg	Russia	CSNTM, INTF
𝔓^{11}=[𝔓^{14}]	500-600	1 Corinthians 1:25-27, 2:6-8 3:8-10, 20	4 Frg	Saint Catherine's Monastery	Harris 14	Sinai	Egypt	CSNTM (transcription)
𝔓^{12}	275-300	Hebrews 1:1	1 Frg	Morgan Library	Pap. Gr. 3; P. Amherst 3b	New York City	United States	CSNTM
𝔓^{12}	275-300	Hebrews 1:1	1 Frg	Morgan Library	Pap. Gr. 3; P. Amherst 3b	New York City	United States	INTF
𝔓^{13}	225-250	Hebrews 2:14-5:5, 10:8-22, 10:29-11:14, 11:28-12:17	1 Frg (scroll)	British Library	P. Oxy. 657; Inv. Nr. 1532v	London	UK	CSNTM
𝔓^{13}	225-250	Hebrews 2:14-5:5, 10:8-22, 10:29-11:14, 11:28-12:17	1 Frg (scroll)	British Library	P. Oxy. 657; Inv. Nr. 1532v	London	UK	INTF
𝔓^{13}	225-250	Hebrews 2:14-5:5, 10:8-22, 10:29-11:14, 11:28-12:17	1 Frg (scroll)	Egyptian Museum	PSI 1292	Cairo	Egypt	CSNTM
𝔓^{13}	225-250	Hebrews 2:14-5:5, 10:8-22, 10:29-11:14, 11:28-12:17	1 Frg (scroll)	Egyptian Museum	PSI 1292	Cairo	Egypt	INTF
[𝔓^{14}]=𝔓^{11}								
𝔓^{15}	200-300	1 Corinthians 7:18-32, 7:33-8:4	1 Frg	Egyptian Museum	P. Oxy. 1008; JE 47423	Cairo	Egypt	CSNTM
𝔓^{15}	200-300	1 Corinthians 7:18-32, 7:33-8:4	1 Frg	Egyptian Museum	P. Oxy. 1008; JE 47423	Cairo	Egypt	INTF
𝔓^{16}	200-400	Philippians 3:10-17, 4:2-8	1 Frg	Egyptian Museum	P. Oxy. 1009; JE 47424	Cairo	Egypt	CSNTM
𝔓^{16}	200-400	Philippians 3:10-17, 4:2-8	1 Frg	Egyptian Museum	P. Oxy. 1009; JE 47424	Cairo	Egypt	INTF
𝔓^{17}	300-400	Hebrews 9:2-14, 9:15-19	1 Frg	Cambridge University Library	P. Oxy. 1078; Add. Mss. 5893	Cambridge	UK	CSNTM, INTF
𝔓^{18}	200-400	Revelation 1:4-7	1 Frg	British Library	P. Oxy. 1079; Papyrus 2053	London	UK	BL, CSNTM, INTF
𝔓^{19}	300-500	Matthew 10:32-40, 10:41-11:5	1 Frg	Bodleian Library	P. Oxy. 1170; Gr. bibl. d. 6 (P)	Oxford	UK	CSNTM, INTF
𝔓^{19}	300-500	Matthew 10:32-40, 10:41-11:5	1 Frg	Bodleian Library	P. Oxy. 1170; Gr. bibl. d. 6 (P)	Oxford	UK	DB
𝔓^{20}	200-300	James 2:19-3:2, 3:3-9	1 Frg	Princeton University Library	P. Oxy. 1171; AM 4117	Princeton; New Jersey	United States	PUL, CSNTM, INTF
𝔓^{21}	300-500	Matthew 12:24-26, 12:32-33	1 Frg	Muhlenberg College	P. Oxy. 1227; Pap. 3	Allentown; Pennsylvania	United States	MC, CSNTM, INTF
𝔓^{22}	200-300	John 15:25-16:3, 16:21-32	2 Frg	Glasgow University Library	P. Oxy. 1228; MS 2-X.I	Glasgow	UK	UOG, CSNTM
𝔓^{22}	200-300	John 15:25-16:3, 16:21-32	2 Frg	Glasgow University Library	P. Oxy. 1228; MS 2-X.I	Glasgow	UK	CSNTM
𝔓^{22}	200-300	John 15:25-16:3, 16:21-32	2 Frg	Glasgow University Library	P. Oxy. 1228; MS 2-X.I	Glasgow	UK	INTF
𝔓^{23}	200-225	James 1:10-12, 1:15-18	1 Frg	University of Illinois	P. Oxy. 1229; G. P. 1229	Urbana, Illinois	United States	UOI, CSNTM
𝔓^{23}	200-225	James 1:10-12, 1:15-18	1 Frg	University of Illinois	P. Oxy. 1229; G. P. 1229	Urbana, Illinois	United States	INTF
𝔓^{24}	300-400	Revelation 5:5-8, -6:5-8	1 Frg	Franklin Trask Library; Andover Newton Theological School	P. Oxy. 1230; OP 1230	Newton Centre; Massachusetts	United States	CSNTM
𝔓^{24}	300-400	Revelation 5:5-8, -6:5-8	1 Frg	Franklin Trask Library; Andover Newton Theological School	P. Oxy. 1230; OP 1230	Newton Centre; Massachusetts	United States	INTF
𝔓^{25}	375-400	Matthew 18:32-34, 19:1-3, 5-7, 9-10	1 Frg	Berlin State Museums	Inv. 16388	Berlin	Germany	BerlPap, CSNTM, INTF
𝔓^{26}	600-625	Romans 1:1-9, 1:9-16	1 Frg	(Joseph S) Bridwell Library; Southern Methodist University	P. Oxy. 1354	Dallas, Texas	United States	CSNTM, INTF
𝔓^{26}	600-625	Romans 1:1-9, 1:9-16	1 Frg	(Joseph S) Bridwell Library; Southern Methodist University	P. Oxy. 1354	Dallas, Texas	United States	CSNTM
𝔓^{27}	200-300	Romans 8:12-22, 24-27, 8:33--9:3, 5-9	2 Frg	Cambridge University Library	P. Oxy. 1355; Add. 7211	Cambridge	UK	CSNTM
𝔓^{27}	200-300	Romans 8:12-22, 24-27, 8:33--9:3, 5-9	2 Frg	Cambridge University Library	P. Oxy. 1355; Add. 7211	Cambridge	UK	INTF
𝔓^{28}	200-300	John 6:8-12, 6:17-22	1 Frg	Palestine Institute Museum; Pacific School of Religion	P. Oxy. 1596; Pap. 2	Berkeley; California	United States	CSNTM
𝔓^{28}	200-300	John 6:8-12, 6:17-22	1 Frg	Palestine Institute Museum; Pacific School of Religion	P. Oxy. 1596; Pap. 2	Berkeley; California	United States	INTF
𝔓^{29}	200-300	Acts 26:7-8, 26:20	1 Frg	Bodleian Library	P. Oxy. 1597; Gr. bibl. g. 4 (P)	Oxford	UK	CSNTM
𝔓^{29}	200-300	Acts 26:7-8, 26:20	1 Frg	Bodleian Library	P. Oxy. 1597; Gr. bibl. g. 4 (P)	Oxford	UK	INTF
𝔓^{30}	200-300	1 Thessalonians 4:12-13, 16-17, 5:3, 8-10, 12-18; 2 Thessalonians 1:1-2	5 Frg	Ghent University Library	P. Oxy. 1598; Inv. 61	Ghent	Belgium	GUL, CSNTM
𝔓^{30}	200-300	1 Thessalonians 4:12-13, 16-17, 5:3, 8-10, 12-18; 2 Thessalonians 1:1-2	5 Frg	Ghent University Library	P. Oxy. 1598; Inv. 61	Ghent	Belgium	INTF
𝔓^{31}	600-700	Romans 12:3-8	1 Frg	John Rylands University Library	P. Ryl. 4; Gr. P. 4	Manchester	UK	CSNTM
𝔓^{31}	600-700	Romans 12:3-8	1 Frg	John Rylands University Library	P. Ryl. 4; Gr. P. 4	Manchester	UK	INTF
𝔓^{32}	~200	Titus 1:11-15, 2:3-8	1 Frg	John Rylands University Library	P. Ryl. 5; G. P. 5	Manchester	UK	CSNTM, INTF
𝔓^{33}=[𝔓^{58}]	500-600	Acts 7:6-10, 7:13-18, 15:21-24, 15:26-32	4 Frg	Austrian National Library	G 17973 Pap, G 26133 Pap, G 35831 Pap, G 39783 Pap	Vienna	Austria	ANL
𝔓^{33}=[𝔓^{58}]	500-600	Acts 7:6-10, 7:13-18, 15:21-24, 15:26-32	4 Frg	Austrian National Library	G 17973 Pap, G 26133 Pap, G 35831 Pap, G 39783 Pap	Vienna	Austria	CSNTM, INTF
𝔓^{34}	600-700	1 Corinthians 16:4-7, 10; 2 Corinthians 5:18-21, 10:13-14, -11:2, 4, 6-7	1 Frg	Austrian National Library	G 39784 Pap	Vienna	Austria	ANL, CSNTM, INTF
𝔓^{35}	400-600	Matthew 25:12-15, 25:20-23	1 Frg	Laurentian Library	PSI I 1	Florence	Italy	BML, CSNTM, INTF
𝔓^{36}	500-600	John 3:14-17, 3:17-18, 3:31-32, 3:34-35	2 Frg	Laurentian Library	PSI I 3	Florence	Italy	BML, CSNTM, INTF
𝔓^{37}	200-400	Matthew 26:19-37, 26:37-52	1 Frg	University of Michigan	P. Mich. 137; Inv. Nr. 1570	Ann Arbor; Michigan	United States	CSNTM, INTF
𝔓^{38}	300-325	Acts 18:27-19:6, 19:12-16	3 Frg	University of Michigan	P. Mich. 138; Inv. 1571	Ann Arbor; Michigan	United States	CSNTM, INTF
𝔓^{39}	200-300	John 8:14-18, 8:18-21	1 Frg	Museum of the Bible	P. Oxy. 1780; MOTB.PAP.000116	Washington, DC	United States	CSNTM, INTF, MOTB
𝔓^{40}	200-300	Romans 1:24-27, 31-2:3, 3:21-4:8, 6:4-5, 16, 9:16-17, 27	5 Frg	Institute for Papyrology; University of Heidelberg	P. Heid. Inv. G. 645	Heidelberg	Germany	UOH, CSNTM, INTF
𝔓^{41}	700-800	Acts 17:28-31, 17:34-18:2	1 Frg	Austrian National Library	K 7541	Vienna	Austria	ANL
𝔓^{41}	700-800	Acts 17:28-31, 17:34-18:2	1 Frg	Austrian National Library	K 7541	Vienna	Austria	CSNTM, INTF
𝔓^{41}	700-800	Acts 18:17-18, 22-23	3 Frg	Austrian National Library	K 7384, K 7396, K 7914	Vienna	Austria	ANL, INTF
𝔓^{41}	700-800	Acts 18:24-25, 27	1 Frg	Austrian National Library	K 7542	Vienna	Austria	ANL
𝔓^{41}	700-800	Acts 18:24-25, 27	1 Frg	Austrian National Library	K 7542	Vienna	Austria	CSNTM, INTF
𝔓^{41}	700-800	Acts 19:1-4, 6-8	1 Frg	Austrian National Library	K 7543	Vienna	Austria	ANL
𝔓^{41}	700-800	Acts 19:1-4, 6-8	1 Frg	Austrian National Library	K 7543	Vienna	Austria	INTF
𝔓^{41}	700-800	Acts 19:13-16, 18-19	1 Frg	Austrian National Library	K 7544	Vienna	Austria	ANL
𝔓^{41}	700-800	Acts 19:13-16, 18-19	1 Frg	Austrian National Library	K 7544	Vienna	Austria	INTF
𝔓^{41}	700-800	Acts 20:9, 10-13, 15-16	1 Frg	Austrian National Library	K 7545	Vienna	Austria	ANL
𝔓^{41}	700-800	Acts 20:9, 10-13, 15-16	1 Frg	Austrian National Library	K 7545	Vienna	Austria	CSNTM, INTF
𝔓^{41}	700-800	Acts 20:22-24, 26-28	1 Frg	Austrian National Library	K 7546	Vienna	Austria	ANL
𝔓^{41}	700-800	Acts 20:22-24, 26-28	1 Frg	Austrian National Library	K 7546	Vienna	Austria	CSNTM, INTF
𝔓^{41}	700-800	Acts 20:28-30	1 Frg	Austrian National Library	K 7426	Vienna	Austria	ANL
𝔓^{41}	700-800	Acts 20:28-30	1 Frg	Austrian National Library	K 7426	Vienna	Austria	INTF
𝔓^{41}	700-800	Acts 20:30-31	1 Frg	Austrian National Library	K 7731	Vienna	Austria	ANL
𝔓^{41}	700-800	Acts 20:30-31	1 Frg	Austrian National Library	K 7731	Vienna	Austria	INTF
𝔓^{41}	700-800	Acts 20:32-35	1 Frg	Austrian National Library	K 7377	Vienna	Austria	ANL
𝔓^{41}	700-800	Acts 20:32-35	1 Frg	Austrian National Library	K 7377	Vienna	Austria	INTF
𝔓^{41}	700-800	Acts 20:35-38, 21:1-3	1 Frg	Austrian National Library	K 7547	Vienna	Austria	ANL
𝔓^{41}	700-800	Acts 20:35-38, 21:1-3	1 Frg	Austrian National Library	K 7547	Vienna	Austria	CSNTM, INTF
𝔓^{41}	700-800	Acts 21:26-27	1 Frg	Austrian National Library	K 7912	Vienna	Austria	INTF
𝔓^{41}	700-800	Acts 22:11-14, 16-17	1 Frg	Austrian National Library	K 7548	Vienna	Austria	ANL
𝔓^{41}	700-800	Acts 22:11-14, 16-17	1 Frg	Austrian National Library	K 7548	Vienna	Austria	CSNTM, INTF
𝔓^{42}	600-800	Luke 1:54-55, 2:29-32	1 Frg	Austrian National Library	K 8706	Vienna	Austria	ANL, CSNTM, INTF
𝔓^{43}	500-700	Revelation 2:12-13, 15:8-16:2	1 Frg	British Library	Inv. 2241	London	UK	CSNTM
𝔓^{43}	500-700	Revelation 2:12-13, 15:8-16:2	1 Frg	British Library	Inv. 2241	London	UK	INTF
𝔓^{44}	500-700	Matthew 17:1-3, 6-7, 18:15-17, 19, 25:8-10; John 10:8-14	6 Frg	Metropolitan Museum of Art	14.1.527	New York City	United States	CSNTM, MMA
𝔓^{44}	500-700	Matthew 17:1-3, 6-7, 18:15-17, 19, 25:8-10; John 10:8-14	6 Frg	Metropolitan Museum of Art	14.1.527	New York City	United States	INTF
𝔓^{45}	~250	Matthew 20:24-32, 21:13-19; Mark 4:36-40, 5:15-26, 5:38-6:3, 16-25, 36-50, 7:3-15, 7:25-8:1, 10-26, 8:34-9:9, 18-31, 11:27-12:1, 5-8, 13-19, 24-28; Luke 6:31-41, 6:45-7:7, 9:26-41, 9:45-10:1, 6-22, 10:26-11:1, 6-25, 28-46, 11:50-12:12, 18-37, 12:42-13:1, 6-24; 13:29-14:10, 17-33; John 4:51-54, 5:1-3a, 20-25, 10:7-25, 10:30-11:10, 18-36, 42-57; Acts 4:27-36, 5:1-21, 30-39, 6:7-7:2, 10-21, 32-41, 7:52-8:1, 14-25, 34-36, 8:38-9:6, 16-27, 9:35-10:2, 10-23, 31-41, 11:2-14, 11:24-12:5, 13-22, 13:6-16, 25-36, 13:46-14:3, 15-23, 15:2-7, 19-27, 15:38-16:4, 15-22, 32-40; 17:9-17	28	Chester Beatty Library	BP I	Dublin	Ireland	CSNTM, INTF
𝔓^{45}	~250	Matthew 25:41-26:39	2	Austrian National Library	G 31974 Pap	Vienna	Austria	CSNTM, INTF
𝔓^{46}	175-225	Romans 5:17–6:14, 8:15–11:35, 14:9–15:11; Hebrews 8:9–9:10, 9:26–end 1 Corinthians 1:1-2:3, 3:6–end 2 Corinthians 1:1-9:7; Galatians 6:10–end Philippians; Colossians; 1 Thessalonians 1:1–2:3, 5:5, 23–28	56	Chester Beatty Library	BP II	Dublin	Ireland	CSNTM, INTF
𝔓^{46}	175-225	Romans 11:35–14:8, 15:11-16:23, 16:25-end Hebrews 1:1-8:8, 9:10–26; 1 Corinthians 2:3–3:5; 2 Corinthians 9:7–end Ephesians; Galatians 1:1–6:10	30	University of Michigan	Inv. 6238	Ann Arbor, Michigan	United States	CSNTM, INTF
𝔓^{47}	200-300	Revelation 9:10-11:3, 11:5-16:15, 16:17-17:2	10 Frg	Chester Beatty Library	BP III	Dublin	Ireland	CSNTM, INTF
𝔓^{48}	200-300	Acts 23:11-17, 23:25-29	1 Frg	Laurentian Library	PSI X 1165	Florence	Italy	BML, CSNTM, INTF
𝔓^{49}	275-300	Ephesians 4:16-29, 4:32-5:13	2 Frg	Yale University Library	P. 415	New Haven; Connecticut	United States	YUL, CSNTM, INTF
𝔓^{50}	200-400 (if real)	Acts 8:26-30, 8:30-32, 10:26-27, 10:27-30, 10:30-31	1 Frg	Yale University Library	P. 1543	New Haven; Connecticut	United States	CSNTM, INTF

=== Papyrus 51–100 ===
Name	Date	Content	Pages	Institution	Ref #	City, State	Country	Images
𝔓^{51}	400-425	Galatians 1:2-10, 13, 16-20	1 Frg	Papyrology Rooms, Sackler Library	P. Oxy. 2157	Oxford	UK	OP, CSNTM, INTF
𝔓^{52}	110-140	John 18:31-33, 18:37-38	1 Frg	John Rylands University Library	Gr. P. 457	Manchester	UK	CSNTM, INTF
𝔓^{53}	200-300	Matthew 26:29-40; Acts 9:33-10:1	3 Frg	University of Michigan	Inv. 6652	Ann Arbor; Michigan	United States	CSNTM, INTF
𝔓^{54}	400-600	James 2:16-18, 3:2-4	2 Frg	Princeton University Library	Garrett 7742	Princeton; New Jersey	United States	CSNTM, INTF
𝔓^{55}	500-700	John 1:31-33, 35-38	1 Frg	Austrian National Library	G 26214 Pap	Vienna	Austria	ANL
𝔓^{55}	500-700	John 1:31-33, 35-38	1 Frg	Austrian National Library	G 26214 Pap	Vienna	Austria	CSNTM, INTF
𝔓^{56}	500-600	Acts 1:1-5, 7-11	3 Frg	Austrian National Library	G 19918 Pap, G 19927 Pap	Vienna	Austria	ANL, CSNTM, INTF
𝔓^{57}	300-500	Acts 4:36-5:2, 8-10	1 Frg	Austrian National Library	G 26020 Pap	Vienna	Austria	ANL
𝔓^{57}	300-500	Acts 4:36-5:2, 8-10	1 Frg	Austrian National Library	G 26020 Pap	Vienna	Austria	CSNTM, INTF
[𝔓^{58}]=𝔓^{33}								
𝔓^{59}	600-700	John 1:26, 28, 48, 51, 2:15-16, 11:40-52, 12:25-29, 31, 35, 17:24-26, 18:1-2, 16-17, 22, 21:7, 12-13, 15, 17-20, 23	14 Frg	Morgan Library	P. Colt 3	New York City	United States	CSNTM
𝔓^{59}	600-700	John 1:26, 28, 48, 51, 2:15-16, 11:40-52, 12:25-29, 31, 35, 17:24-26, 18:1-2, 16-17, 22, 21:7, 12-13, 15, 17-20, 23	14 Frg	Morgan Library	P. Colt 3	New York City	United States	INTF
𝔓^{60}	600-700	John 16:29-30, 16:32-17:6, 8-9, 11-15, 18-25, 18:1-2, 4-5, 7-16, 18-20, 23-29, 31-37, 39-40, 19:2-3, 5-8, 10-18, 20, 23-26	20 Frg	Morgan Library	P. Colt 4	New York City	United States	CSNTM, INTF
𝔓^{61}	600-700	Romans 16:23, 25-27; 1 Corinthians 1:1-2, 4-6 5:1-3, 5-6, 9-13; Philippians 3:5-9, 12-16; Colossians 1:3-7, 9-13, 4:15; 1 Thessalonians 1:2-3; Titus 3:1-5, 8-11, 14-15; Philemon 4-7	8 Frg	Morgan Library	P. Colt 5	New York City	United States	CSNTM, INTF
𝔓^{62}	300-400	Matthew 11:25-30	13 Frg	Oslo University Library	Inv. 1661	Oslo	Norway	CSNTM
𝔓^{62}	300-400	Matthew 11:25-30	13 Frg	Oslo University Library	Inv. 1661	Oslo	Norway	INTF
𝔓^{63}	500-525	John 3:14-18, 4:9-10	1 Frg	Berlin State Museums	Inv. 11914	Berlin	Germany	BerlPap, CSNTM, INTF
𝔓^{64}=[𝔓^{67}]	150-300	Matthew 3:9, 15, 5:20-22, 25-28, 26:7-8, 10, 14-15, 22-23, 31-33	5 Frg	Magdalen College	Gr. 18	Oxford	UK	CSNTM
𝔓^{64}=[𝔓^{67}]	150-300	Matthew 3:9, 15, 5:20-22, 25-28, 26:7-8, 10, 14-15, 22-23, 31-33	5 Frg	Magdalen College	Gr. 18	Oxford	UK	INTF
𝔓^{64}=[𝔓^{67}]	150-300	Matthew 3:9, 15, 5:20-22, 25-28, 26:7-8, 10, 14-15, 22-23, 31-33	5 Frg	Montserrat Abbey	II 1	Catalonia	Spain	CSNTM
𝔓^{64}=[𝔓^{67}]	150-300	Matthew 3:9, 15, 5:20-22, 25-28, 26:7-8, 10, 14-15, 22-23, 31-33	5 Frg	Montserrat Abbey	II 1	Catalonia	Spain	INTF
𝔓^{65}	200-300	1 Thessalonians 1:3-2:1, 6-13	1 Frg	Girolamo Vitelli Papyrological Institute	PSI 1373	Florence	Italy	CSNTM
𝔓^{65}	200-300	1 Thessalonians 1:3-2:1, 6-13	1 Frg	Girolamo Vitelli Papyrological Institute	PSI 1373	Florence	Italy	INTF
𝔓^{66}	150-250	John 1:1-5:3a, 5:5-6:11, 6:35b-7:52, 8:12-14:26, 29-30; 15:2-26; 16:2-4, 6-7; 16:10-20:20, 22-23; 20:25-21:9, 12, 17	78	Bodmer library	P. Bodmer II	Cologny, Geneva	Switzerland	INTF
𝔓^{66}	150-250	John 1:1-5:3a, 5:5-6:11, 6:35b-7:52, 8:12-14:26, 29-30; 15:2-26; 16:2-4, 6-7; 16:10-20:20, 22-23; 20:25-21:9, 12, 17	78	Bodmer library	P. Bodmer II	Cologny, Geneva	Switzerland	BL
𝔓^{66}	150-250	John 19:25-28, 31-32	1 Frg	Chester Beatty Library	CBL BP XIX	Dublin	Ireland	CSNTM
𝔓^{66}	150-250	John 19:25-28, 31-32	1 Frg	Chester Beatty Library	CBL BP XIX	Dublin	Ireland	INTF
𝔓^{66}	150-250	John 19:8-11, 13-15, 18-20, 23-24	2 Frg	University of Cologne	Inv. Nr. 4274/4298	Cologne	Germany	UOC
[𝔓^{67}]=𝔓^{64}								
𝔓^{68}	500-700	1 Corinthians 4:12-17, 19-5:3	1 Frg	Russian National Library	Gr. 258B	Saint Petersburg	Russia	CSNTM, INTF
𝔓^{69}	200-300	Luke 22:41, 45-48, 58-61	1 Frg	Papyrology Rooms, Sackler Library	P. Oxy. 2383	Oxford	UK	OP,CSNTM, INTF
𝔓^{70}	200-300	Matthew 11:26-27, 12:4-5	1	Papyrology Rooms, Sackler Library	P. Oxy. 2384	Oxford	UK	OP,CSNTM, INTF
𝔓^{70}	200-300	Matthew 2:13-16, 2:22-3:1, 24:3-6, 24:12-15	2	Girolamo Vitelli Papyrological Institute	PSI inv. CNR 419, 420	Florence	Italy	INTF
𝔓^{71}	300-400	Matthew 19:10-11, 17-18	1 Frg	Papyrology Rooms, Sackler Library	P. Oxy. 2385	Oxford	UK	OP, CSNTM, INTF
𝔓^{72}	200-400	1 Peter 1:1-5:14; 2 Peter 1:1-3:18	18	Vatican Library	P. Bodmer VIII	Vatican City	Vatican City	DVL
𝔓^{72}	200-400	1 Peter 1:1-5:14; 2 Peter 1:1-3:18	18	Vatican Library	P. Bodmer VIII	Vatican City	Vatican City	CSNTM, INTF
𝔓^{72}	200-400	Jude 1:1-25	4	Bodmer library	P. Bodmer VII, VIII	Cologny, Geneva	Switzerland	CSNTM, INTF
𝔓^{73}	600-700	Matthew 25:43, 26:2-3	1 Frg	Bodmer library	P. Bodmer L	Cologny, Geneva	Switzerland	INTF
𝔓^{73}	600-700	Matthew 25:43, 26:2-3	1 Frg	Bodmer library	P. Bodmer L	Cologny, Geneva	Switzerland	CSNTM
𝔓^{74}	600-700	Acts 1:2-5, 7-11, 13-15, 18-19, 22-25, 2:2-4, 2:6-8:36, 8:38-15:33, 15:35-24:6a, 24:8b-28:28, 28:30-31; James 1:1-5:20; 1 Peter 1:1-2, 7-8, 13, 19-20, 25, 2:6-7, 11-12, 18, 24, 3:4-5; 2 Peter 2:21, 3:4, 11, 16; 1 John 1:1, 6, 2:1-2, 7, 13-14, 18-19, 25-26, 3:1-2, 8, 14, 19-20, 4:1, 6-7, 12, 16-17, 5:3-4, 9-10, 17; 2 John 1:1, 6-7, 13 3 John 1:6, 12; Jude 1:3, 7, 11-12, 16, 18, 24	124	Bodmer library	P. Bodmer XVII	Cologny, Geneva	Switzerland	CSNTM
𝔓^{74}	600-700	Acts 1:2-5, 7-11, 13-15, 18-19, 22-25, 2:2-4, 2:6-8:36, 8:38-15:33, 15:35-24:6a, 24:8b-28:28, 28:30-31; James 1:1-5:20; 1 Peter 1:1-2, 7-8, 13, 19-20, 25, 2:6-7, 11-12, 18, 24, 3:4-5; 2 Peter 2:21, 3:4, 11, 16; 1 John 1:1, 6, 2:1-2, 7, 13-14, 18-19, 25-26, 3:1-2, 8, 14, 19-20, 4:1, 6-7, 12, 16-17, 5:3-4, 9-10, 17; 2 John 1:1, 6-7, 13 3 John 1:6, 12; Jude 1:3, 7, 11-12, 16, 18, 24	124	Bodmer library	P. Bodmer XVII	Cologny, Geneva	Switzerland	INTF
𝔓^{75}	200-225	Luke 3:18-4:2, 4:34-5:10, 5:37-17:35, 17:37-18:18, 22:4-41, 22:45-23:16, 23:18-24:53; John 1:1-5:3a, 5:5-7:52, 8:12-11:45, 48-57, 12:3-13:19, 14:8-15:10	50	Vatican Library	P. Bodmer XIV, XV; Hanna Papyrus 1	Vatican City	Vatican City	DVL
𝔓^{75}	200-225	Luke 3:18-4:2, 4:34-5:10, 5:37-17:35, 17:37-18:18, 22:4-41, 22:45-23:16, 23:18-24:53; John 1:1-5:3a, 5:5-7:52, 8:12-11:45, 48-57, 12:3-13:19, 14:8-15:10	50	Vatican Library	P. Bodmer XIV, XV; Hanna Papyrus 1	Vatican City	Vatican City	CSNTM, INTF
𝔓^{76}	500-600	John 4:9, 12	1 Frg	Austrian National Library	G 36102 Pap	Vienna	Austria	ANL
𝔓^{76}	500-600	John 4:9, 12	1 Frg	Austrian National Library	G 36102 Pap	Vienna	Austria	CSNTM, INTF
𝔓^{77}	150-225	Matthew 23:30-39	2 Frg	Papyrology Rooms, Sackler Library	P. Oxy. 2683 and 4405	Oxford	UK	OP, CSNTM, INTF
𝔓^{78}	200-400	Jude 4-5, 7-8	1	Papyrology Rooms, Sackler Library	P. Oxy. 2684	Oxford	UK	OP, CSNTM, INTF
𝔓^{79}	600-700	Hebrews 10:10-12, 28-30	1 Frg	Berlin State Museums	Inv. 6774	Berlin	Germany	CSNTM, INTF
𝔓^{80}	200-300	John 3:34	1 Frg	Montserrat Abbey	P. Barc. 83	Barcelona	Spain	CSNTM
𝔓^{80}	200-300	John 3:34	1 Frg	Montserrat Abbey	P. Barc. 83	Barcelona	Spain	INTF
𝔓^{81}	300-400	1 Peter 2:20-3:1, 4-12	1 Frg	Professor Sergio Daris, University of Trieste	Inv. 20	Trieste	Italy	CSNTM, INTF
𝔓^{82}	300-500	Luke 7:32-34, 37-38	1 Frg	National and University Library	Gr. 2677	Strasbourg	France	CSNTM
𝔓^{82}	300-500	Luke 7:32-34, 37-38	1 Frg	National and University Library	Gr. 2677	Strasbourg	France	INTF
𝔓^{83}	500-600	Matthew 20:23-25, 30-31, 23:39-24:1, 6	2 Frg	Catholic University of Leuven Library	P.A.M. Khirbet Mird 16, 27	Leuven	Belgium	CSNTM, INTF
𝔓^{84}	500-600	Mark 2:2-5, 8-9, 6:30-31, 33-34, 36-37, 39-41; John 5:5, 17:3, 7-8	9 Frg	Catholic University of Leuven Library	P.A.M. Khirbet Mird 4, 11, 26, 27	Leuven	Belgium	CSNTM
𝔓^{84}	500-600	Mark 2:2-5, 8-9, 6:30-31, 33-34, 36-37, 39-41; John 5:5, 17:3, 7-8	9 Frg	Catholic University of Leuven Library	P.A.M. Khirbet Mird 4, 11, 26, 27	Leuven	Belgium	INTF
𝔓^{85}	300-500	Revelation 9:19-10:1, 5-9	3 Frg	National and University Library	Gr. 1028	Strasbourg	France	CSNTM
𝔓^{85}	300-500	Revelation 9:19-10:1, 5-9	3 Frg	National and University Library	Gr. 1028	Strasbourg	France	INTF
𝔓^{86}	300-400	Matthew 5:13-16, 22-25	1 Frg	University of Cologne	Inv. Nr. 5516	Cologne	Germany	CSNTM, INTF, UOC
𝔓^{87}	200-300	Philemon 13-15, 24-25	1 Frg	University of Cologne	Inv. Nr. 12	Cologne	Germany	CSNTM, INTF, UOC
𝔓^{88}	300-400	Mark 2:1-26	2	Catholic University of the Sacred Heart	P. Med. Inv. Nr. 69.24	Milan	Italy	CSNTM, INTF
𝔓^{89}	300-400	Hebrews 6:7-9, 15-17	1 Frg	Laurentian Library	PFlor. 292 (PLaur. IV 142)	Florence	Italy	CSNTM, INTF
𝔓^{90}	150-200	John 18:36-19:1; 19:1-7	1 Frg	Papyrology Rooms, Sackler Library	P. Oxy. 3523	Oxford	UK	OP CSNTM, INTF
𝔓^{91}	200-300	Acts 2:30-37, 2:46-3:2	1 Frg	University of Milan	P. Mil. Vogl. inv. 1224	Milan	Italy	INTF
𝔓^{91}	200-300	Acts 2:30-37, 2:46-3:2	1 Frg	Macquarie University	Inv. 360	Sydney	Australia	CSNTM, INTF
𝔓^{92}	200-400	Ephesians 1:11-13, 19-21; 2 Thessalonians 1:4-5, 11-12	2	Egyptian Museum	PNarmuthis 69.39a/229a	Cairo	Egypt	CSNTM, INTF
𝔓^{93}	400-500	John 13:15-17	1 Frg	Girolamo Vitelli Papyrological Institute	PSI 108	Florence	Italy	CSNTM, INTF
𝔓^{94}	400-600	Romans 6:10-13, 19-22	1 Frg	Egyptian Museum	P. Cair. 10730	Cairo	Egypt	CSNTM, INTF
𝔓^{95}	200-300	John 5:26-29, 36-38	1 Frg	Laurentian Library	PL II/31	Florence	Italy	CSNTM, INTF
𝔓^{96}	500-600	Matthew 3:10-12	1 Frg	Austrian National Library	Pap. K 7244	Vienna	Austria	CSNTM
𝔓^{96}	500-600	Matthew 3:10-12	1 Frg	Austrian National Library	Pap. K 7244	Vienna	Austria	INTF
𝔓^{97}	500-700	Luke 14:7-14	1	Chester Beatty Library	CBL BP XVII	Dublin	Ireland	CSNTM
𝔓^{97}	500-700	Luke 14:7-14	1	Chester Beatty Library	CBL BP XVII	Dublin	Ireland	INTF
𝔓^{98}	150-175	Revelation 1:13-20, 2:1	1 Frg	French Institute for Oriental Archeology	P. IFAO inv. 237b	Cairo	Egypt	CSNTM, INTF
𝔓^{99}	400-425	Glossary, words and phrases from: Romans 1:1; 2 Corinthians 1:3-17, 20-24, 2:1-8:22; 9:2-11:23, 26-13:11; Galatians 1:4-11, 18-6:15, 1:14-4:9 and Ephesians 1:4-2:21, 3:8-6:24	16	Chester Beatty Library	CBL BP XXI	Dublin	Ireland	CSNTM
𝔓^{100}	200-400	James 3:13-4:4, 4:9-5:1	1 Frg	Papyrology Rooms, Sackler Library	P. Oxy. 4449	Oxford	UK	OP, CSNTM, INTF

=== Papyrus 101– ===
Name	Date	Content	Pages	Institution	Ref #	City, State	Country	Images
𝔓^{101}	200-300	Matthew 3:10-12, 16-4:3	1 Frg	Papyrology Rooms, Sackler Library	P. Oxy. 4401	Oxford	UK	OP, CSNTM, INTF
𝔓^{102}	200-400	Matthew 4:11-12, 22-23	1 Frg	Papyrology Rooms, Sackler Library	P. Oxy. 4402	Oxford	UK	OP, CSNTM, INTF
𝔓^{103}	150-235	Matthew 13:55-56-14:3-5	1 Frg	Papyrology Rooms, Sackler Library	P. Oxy. 4403	Oxford	UK	OP, CSNTM, INTF
𝔓^{104}	100-200	Matthew 21:34-37, 43, 45	1 Frg	Papyrology Rooms, Sackler Library	P. Oxy. 4404	Oxford	UK	OP, CSNTM, INTF
𝔓^{105}	400-600	Matthew 27:62-64, 28:2-5	1 Frg	Papyrology Rooms, Sackler Library	P. Oxy. 4406	Oxford	UK	OP, CSNTM, INTF
𝔓^{106}	200-300	John 1:29-35, 40-46	1 Frg	Papyrology Rooms, Sackler Library	P. Oxy. 4445	Oxford	UK	OP, CSNTM, INTF
𝔓^{107}	200-300	John 17:1-2, 11	1 Frg	Papyrology Rooms, Sackler Library	P. Oxy. 4446	Oxford	UK	OP, CSNTM, INTF
𝔓^{108}	200-300	John 17:23-24, 18:1-5	1 Frg	Papyrology Rooms, Sackler Library	P. Oxy. 4447	Oxford	UK	OP, CSNTM, INTF
𝔓^{109}	200-300	John 21:18-20, 23-25	1 Frg	Papyrology Rooms, Sackler Library	P. Oxy. 4448	Oxford	UK	OP, CSNTM, INTF
𝔓^{110}	300-400	Matthew 10:13-15, 25-27	1 Frg	Papyrology Rooms, Sackler Library	P. Oxy. 4494	Oxford	UK	OP, CSNTM, INTF
𝔓^{111}	200-300	Luke 17:11-13, 22-23	1 Frg	Papyrology Rooms, Sackler Library	P. Oxy. 4495	Oxford	UK	OP, CSNTM, INTF
𝔓^{112}	400-500	Acts 26:31-32, 27:6-7	1 Frg	Papyrology Rooms, Sackler Library	P. Oxy. 4496	Oxford	UK	OP, CSNTM, INTF
𝔓^{113}	200-300	Romans 2:12-13, 29	1 Frg	Papyrology Rooms, Sackler Library	P. Oxy. 4497	Oxford	UK	OP, CSNTM, INTF
𝔓^{114}	200-300	Hebrews 1:7-12	1 Frg	Papyrology Rooms, Sackler Library	P. Oxy. 4498	Oxford	UK	OP, CSNTM, INTF
𝔓^{115}	225-275	Revelation 2:1-3, 13-15, 27-29, 3:10-12, 5:8-9, 6:4-6, 8:3-8, 8:11-9:5, 9:7-16, 9:18-10:4, 8-11, 11:1-5, 8-15, 11:18-12:6, 8-10, 12-17, 13:1-3, 6-12, 13-16, 17-18, 14:1-3, 5-7, 10-11, 14-16, 14:18-15:1, 4-7	9	Papyrology Rooms, Sackler Library	P. Oxy. 4499	Oxford	UK	OP, CSNTM, INTF
𝔓^{116}	500-700	Hebrews 2:9-11, 3:3-6	1 Frg	Austrian National Library	P. Vindob. G 42417	Vienna	Austria	ANL, CSNTM, INTF
𝔓^{117}	300-500	2 Corinthians 7:6-11	1 Frg	University of Hamburg	Inv. 1002	Hamburg	Germany	CSNTM
𝔓^{117}	300-500	2 Corinthians 7:6-11	1 Frg	University of Hamburg	Inv. 1002	Hamburg	Germany	INTF
𝔓^{118}	200-300	Romans 15:26-27, 32-33, 16:1, 4-7, 11-12	1 (4 Frg)	University of Cologne	Inv. Nr. 10311	Cologne	Germany	CSNTM, INTF, UOC
𝔓^{119}	200-300	John 1:21-28, 38-44	1 Frg	Papyrology Rooms, Sackler Library	P. Oxy. 4803	Oxford	UK	OP, CSNTM, INTF
𝔓^{120}	300-400	John 1:25-28, 33-38, 42-44	2 Frg	Papyrology Rooms, Sackler Library	P. Oxy. 4804	Oxford	UK	OP, CSNTM, INTF
𝔓^{121}	200-300	John 19:17-18, 25-26	1 Frg	Papyrology Rooms, Sackler Library	P. Oxy. 4805	Oxford	UK	OP, CSNTM, INTF
𝔓^{122}	300-500	John 21:11-14.22-24	1 Frg	Papyrology Rooms, Sackler Library	P. Oxy. 4806	Oxford	UK	OP, CSNTM, INTF
𝔓^{123}	300-400	1 Corinthians 14:31-34, -15:3-6	1 Frg	Papyrology Rooms, Sackler Library	P. Oxy. 4844	Oxford	UK	OP, CSNTM, INTF
𝔓^{124}	500-600	2 Corinthians 11:1-4, 6-9	1 Frg	Papyrology Rooms, Sackler Library	P. Oxy. 4845	Oxford	UK	OP, CSNTM, INTF
𝔓^{125}	200-400	1 Peter 1:23-2:5; 2:7-12	1 Frg	Papyrology Rooms, Sackler Library	P. Oxy. 4934	Oxford	UK	OP, CSNTM, INTF
𝔓^{126}	300-400	Hebrews 13:12-13.19-20	1 Frg	Girolamo Vitelli Papyrological Institute	PSI inv. 1479	Florence	Italy	CSNTM, INTF
𝔓^{127}	400-500	Acts 10:32-35, 40-45, 11:2-5, 11:30-12:3, 5, 7-9, 15:29-30, 34-41, 16:1-4, 13-40, 17:1-10	8	Papyrology Rooms, Sackler Library	P. Oxy. 4968	Oxford	UK	OP, CSNTM, INTF
𝔓^{128}	500-700	John 9:3-4, 12:16-18	1 (6 Frg)	Metropolitan Museum of Art	14.1.527	New York City	US	CSNTM, MMA
𝔓^{128}	500-700	John 9:3-4, 12:16-18	1 (6 Frg)	Metropolitan Museum of Art	14.1.527	New York City	US	INTF
𝔓^{129}	200-300	1 Corinthians 8:10-9:3; 9:27-10:6	2 Frg	Formerly Museum of the Bible	MOTB.PAP.000120/P. Oxy. inv. 106/116(c)	Washington, DC	US	P129
𝔓^{129}	200-300	1 Corinthians 7:32-37; 9:10-16	2 Frg	Formerly in the Stimer Collection	P.Oxy. inv. 106/116(c)	Camarillo, CA	US	
𝔓^{130}	200-400	Hebrews 9:9-12, 19-23	1 Frg	Museum of the Bible	MOTB.PAP.000401	Washington, DC	US	
𝔓^{131}	200-300	Romans 9:18-21, 33-10:2	1 Frg	Formerly Museum of the Bible	MOTB.PAP.000425 P.Oxy. inv. 29 4B.46/G(4-6)a	Washington, DC Oxford	US UK	
𝔓^{131}	200-300	Romans 9:21-23; 10:3-4	1 Frg	Formerly in the Stimer Collection	P.Oxy. inv. 29 4B.46/G(4-6)a	Camarillo, CA	US	
𝔓^{132}	200-400	Ephesians 3:21-4:2, 14-16	1 Frg	Papyrology Rooms, Sackler Library	P.Oxy. 5258	Oxford	UK	OP, INTF
𝔓^{133}	200-300	1 Timothy 3:13-4:8	3 Frg	Papyrology Rooms, Sackler Library	P.Oxy. 5259	Oxford	UK	OP, INTF
𝔓^{134}	200-400	John 1:49-2:1	1 Frg	Harry Ransom Center, University of Texas at Austin	Willoughby Papyrus		US	ETC, INTF
𝔓^{135}	300-500	Galatians 3:21-22, 28-29, 4:31-5:6, 10-15	2	Museum of the Bible	SIG.PAP.000531.1-2	Washington, DC	US	
𝔓^{136}	500-600	Acts 4:27-31; 7:26-30	1	Duke University	P. Duke Inv. 1377	Durham, NC	US	INTF, DU
𝔓^{137}	150-250	Mark 1:7-9, 16-18	1 Frg	Papyrology Rooms, Sackler Library	P.Oxy. 5345	Oxford	UK	Oxford
𝔓^{138}	200-300	Luke 13:13–17, 25–30	1 Frg	Papyrology Rooms, Sackler Library	P.Oxy. 5346	Oxford	UK	Oxford
𝔓^{139}	300-400	Philemon 1:6-8, 18-20	1 Frg	Papyrology Rooms, Sackler Library	P.Oxy. 5347	Oxford	UK	Oxford
𝔓^{140}	400-500	Acts 7:54-55, 57-58	1 Frg	Girolamo Vitelli Papyrological Institute	PSI inv. 1971	Florence	Italy	
𝔓^{141}	200-300	Luke 2:32-34, 40-42; 24:22-28, 30-38	2 Frg	Papyrology Rooms, Sackler Library	P.Oxy. 5478	Oxford	UK	Oxford

== Distribution based on content ==
Book	Early	Total	100-200 CE	200-300 CE	300-400 CE	400-500 CE	500-600 CE	600-700 CE	700-800 CE
Matthew	16	24	104	1, 45, 53, 64, 70, 101	25, 62, 71, 86, 110		83, 96	73	
Matthew	16	24	77, 103		19, 21		44		
Matthew	16	24		37, 102		35, 105			
Mark	3	4		45	88		84		
Mark	3	4	137						
Luke	7	12		4, 45, 69, 75, 111, 138, 141	7, 82		3, 97		
Luke	7	12						42	
John	20	32	52, 90	5, 22, 28, 39, 45, 66, 75, 80, 95, 106, 107, 108, 109, 119, 121	6, 120	93	2, 36, 63, 76, 84	59, 60	
John	20	32			122		44, 55, 128		
John	20	32		134					
Acts	7	17		29, 45, 48, 53, 91	8, 38	112, 127, 140	33, 56, 136	74	41
Acts	7	17			50, 57				
Romans	7	12		27, 40, 46, 113, 118, 131	10	99		26, 31	61
Romans	7	12				94			
1 Corinth.	4	8		15, 46, 129	123		11	34	61
1 Corinth.	4	8					68		
2 Corinth.	1	5		46		99	124	34	
2 Corinth.	1	5			117				
Galatians	1	4		46		51, 99			
Galatians	1	4			135				
Ephesians	4	5		46, 49		99			
Ephesians	4	5		92, 132					
Philippians	2	3		46					61
Philippians	2	3		16					
Colossians	1	2		46					61
1 Thess.	3	4		30, 46, 65					61
2 Thess.	2	2		30					
2 Thess.	2	2		92					
1 Timothy	1	1		133					
2 Timothy	0	0							
Titus	1	2		32					61
Philemon	2	3		87	139				61
Hebrews	8	10		12, 46, 114	17, 89, 126			79	
Hebrews	8	10		13, 130			116		
James	3	5		20, 23				74	
James	3	5		100		54			
1 Peter	3	4			81			74	
1 Peter	3	4		72, 125					
2 Peter	1	2		72				74	
1 John	1	2		9				74	
2 John	0	1						74	
3 John	0	1						74	
Jude	2	3		72, 78				74	
Revelation	5	7		47	24				
Revelation	5	7	98		85				
Revelation	5	7		18, 115			43		

Note: "Early" manuscripts are manuscripts dated firmly from the fourth century or earlier. Roughly half of the papyri are "early". Some manuscripts contain content from more than one New Testament book, so the numbers above do not directly correspond to the total number of manuscripts.

== See also ==
Lists

- Categories of New Testament manuscripts
- List of artifacts significant to the Bible
- List of Egyptian papyri by date
- List of New Testament uncials
- List of New Testament minuscules
- List of New Testament lectionaries
- List of New Testament amulets
- List of New Testament Latin manuscripts

Other articles

- Novum Testamentum Graece
- Oxyrhynchus papyri
- Palaeography
- Papyrology
- Textual criticism
