= Papyrus 113 =

Religious manuscript

- New Testament manuscript
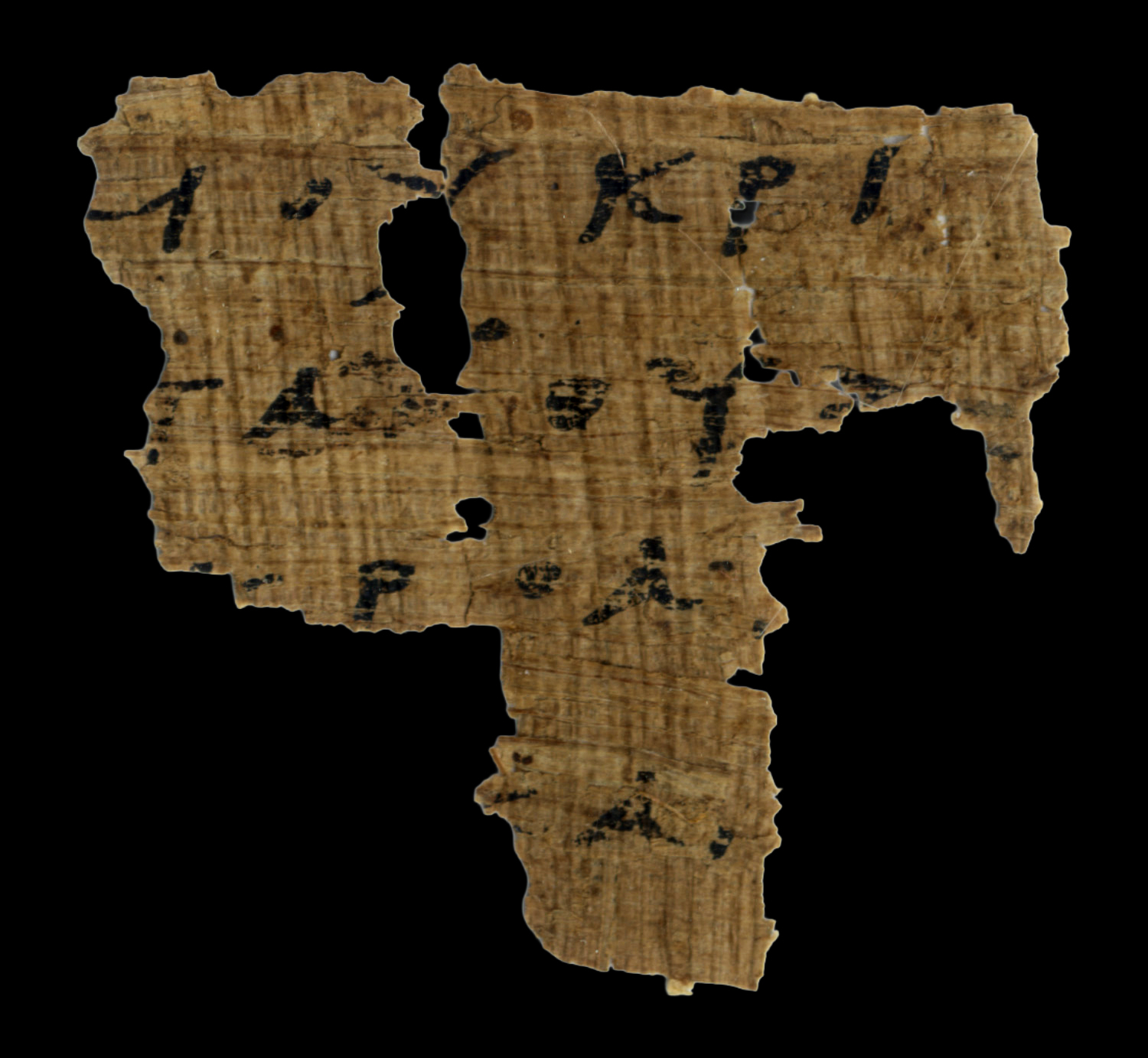
- Recto, Romans 2:12-13
- Name: P. Oxy. 4497
- Sign: 𝔓^{113}
- Text: Epistle to the Romans 2:12-13,29
- Date: 3rd century
- Script: Greek
- Found: Oxyrhynchus, Egypt
- Now at: Sackler Library
- Cite: W. E. H. Cockle, OP LXVI (1999), pp. 7-8
- Size: [31] x [18] cm
- Type: Alexandrian text-type (?)
- Category: none
- Note: no unique readings

Papyrus 113 (in the Gregory-Aland numbering), designated by 𝔓^{113}, is a fragment of an early copy of a section of the New Testament in Greek. It comes from a papyrus manuscript of the Epistle to the Romans. The surviving text features parts of Romans 2:12-13 on one side of the fragment and parts of 2:29 on the other.

The manuscript paleographically has been assigned by the INTF to the 3rd century. Comfort dated it to the first half of the 3rd century. The manuscript is currently housed at the Papyrology Rooms, of the Sackler Library at Oxford University with the shelf number P. Oxy. 4497.

== Text ==
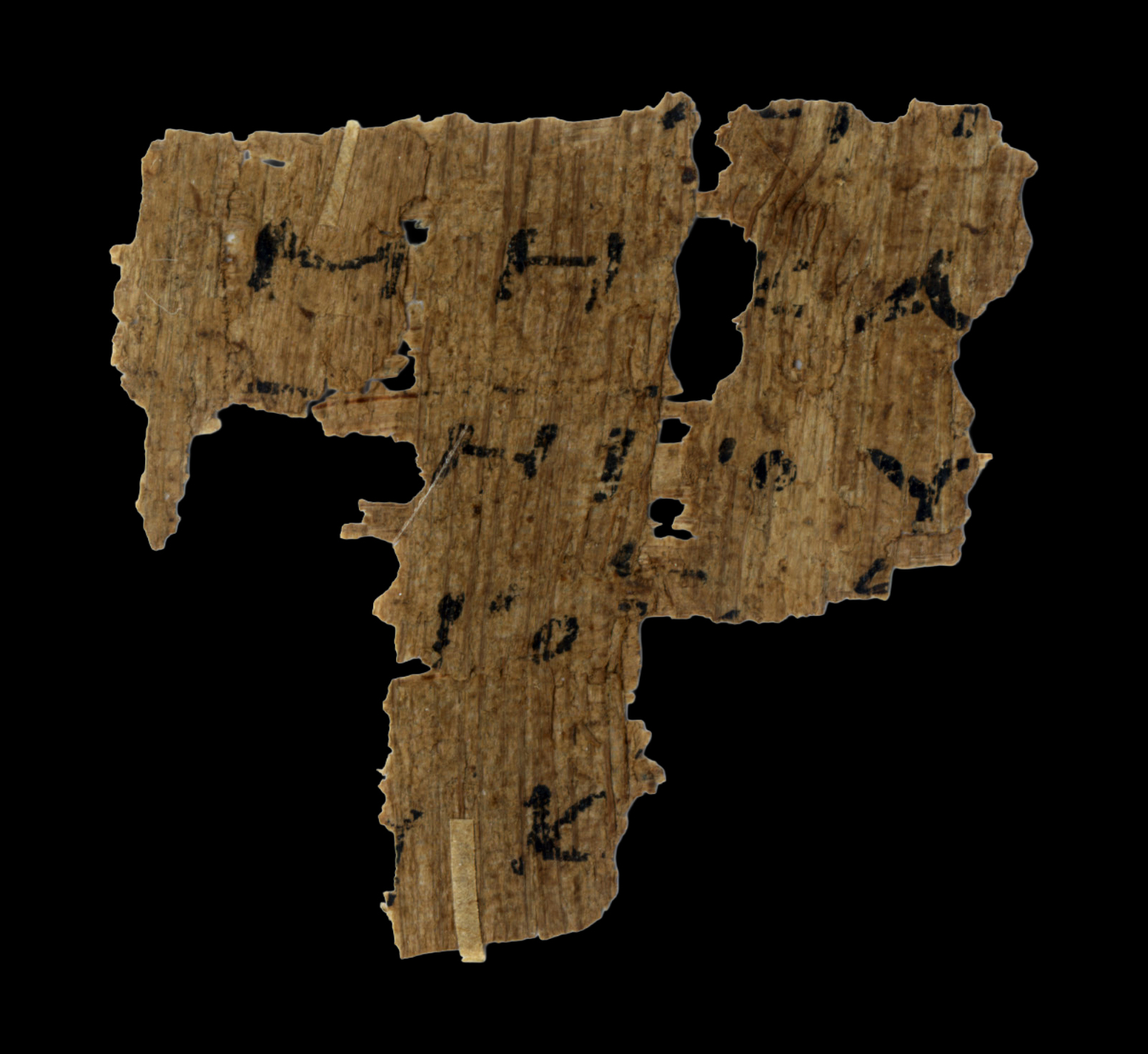
Verso, Romans 2:29

Although Comfort stated that the Greek text of this codex is too small to determine its textual character, word-spacing analysis indicates that it contained the Alexandrian omission of του in verse 13.

No readings to be added.

== See also ==
- List of New Testament papyri
- Oxyrhynchus Papyri
