= Papyrus 140 =

Papyrus manuscript

- New Testament manuscript
- Name: PSI inv. 1971
- Sign: 𝔓^{140}
- Text: Acts 7:54-55 (recto); 7:57-58 (verso).
- Date: 5th century
- Script: Greek
- Found: Possibly Oxyrhynchus
- Now at: Papyrological Institute, Florence, Italy
- Cite: Francesca Maltomini et al (ed), Firenze University Press (2018). Papyri of the Italian Society, vol. XVII, 3-5.
- Size: 2.8 x 4.3 cm

Papyrus 140 (designated as 𝔓^{140} in the Gregory-Aland numbering system) is a small surviving portion of a handwritten copy of part of the New Testament in Greek. It is a papyrus manuscript of the Acts. The text survives on a single fragment of a codex, the recto containing the initial letters of 4 lines of the second column of a page, and the verso the final letters of 4 lines (plus minimal traces of a fifth) of the first column of the next page. The manuscript has been assigned paleographically to the fifth century.

== Location ==
𝔓^{140} is housed at the Papyrological Institute in Florence, Italy.

== Textual Variants ==
- 7:54-55 According to the PSI reconstruction, the recto reads:

επ α̣υ̣τ̣ο̣[ν πληρηϲ
δε ϋπ̣[αρχων
πν̅ι α̣[γιω ατε-
νιϲα[ϲ ειϲ τον

demonstrating a transposition of πληρηϲ and ϋπ̣αρχων, and a change from the genitive πν̅ϲ α̣γιου to the dative πν̅ι α̣γιω, as compared to the reading in most manuscripts of Acts.

- 7:57-58 According to the PSI reconstruction, the verso reads:

οµοθ]υµαδο[ν
επ αυ]τον εκ-
βαλον]τεϲ δε
εξω τη]ϲ πολε
ωϲ ελιθο]β̣[ολουν

showing the omission of και at the beginning of verse 58.

== See also ==
- List of New Testament papyri
