= Papyrus 76 =

Papyrus 𝔓^{76}
- New Testament manuscript
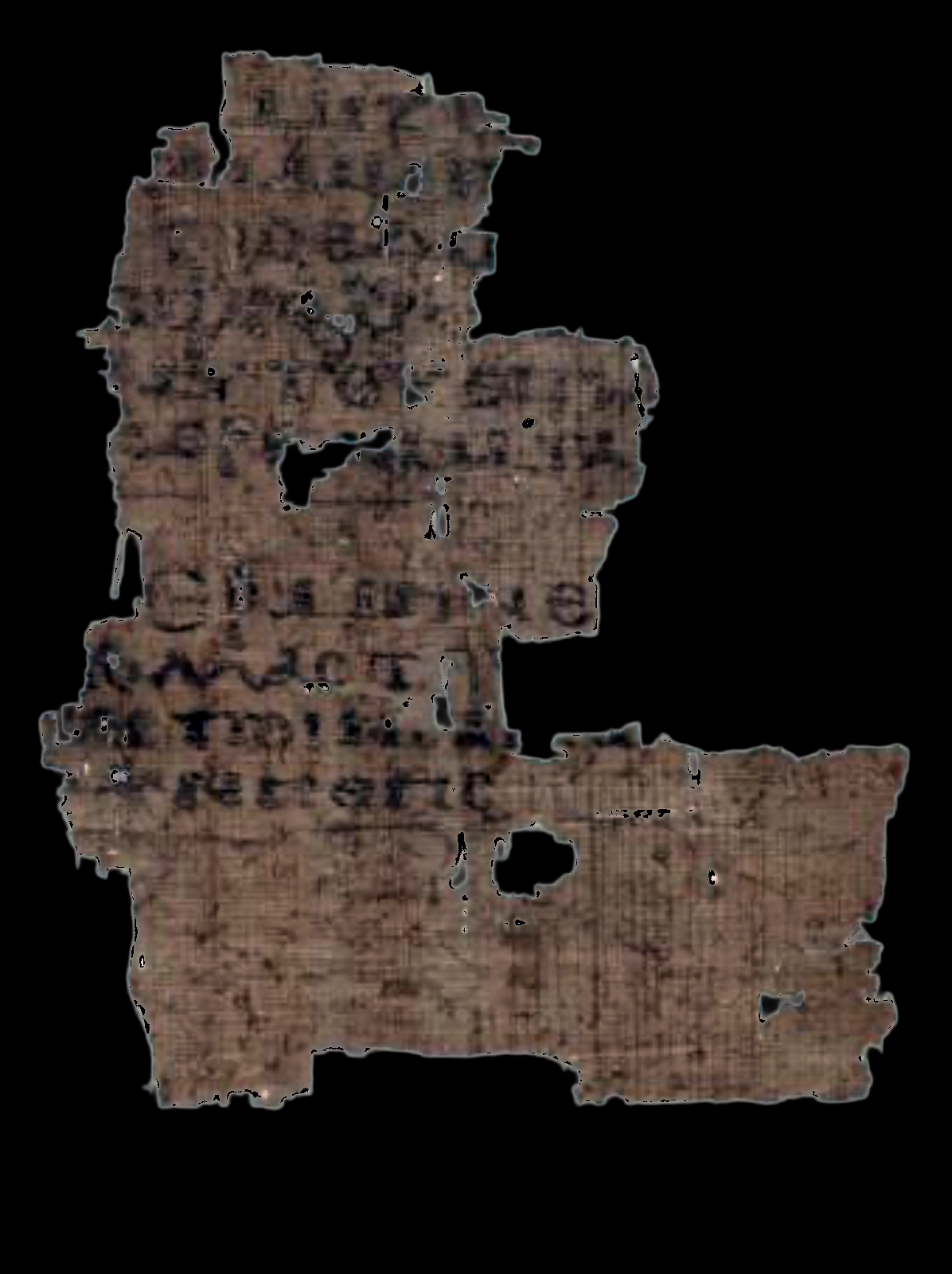
- Recto, John 4:12
- Text: John 4 †
- Date: 6th century
- Script: Greek
- Found: Egypt
- Now at: Österreichische Nationalbibliothek
- Cite: H. Hunger, Zwei unbekannte neutestamentliche Papyrusfragmente der österreichischen Nationalbibliothek , Biblos VIII (1959), pp. 7-12.
- Size: 13.8 cm x 11 cm
- Type: mixed
- Category: III

Papyrus 76 (in the Gregory-Aland numbering), signed by 𝔓^{76}, is a copy of the New Testament in Greek. It is a papyrus manuscript of the Gospel of John. The surviving texts of John are verses 4:9,12.

The manuscript paleographically has been assigned to the 6th century.

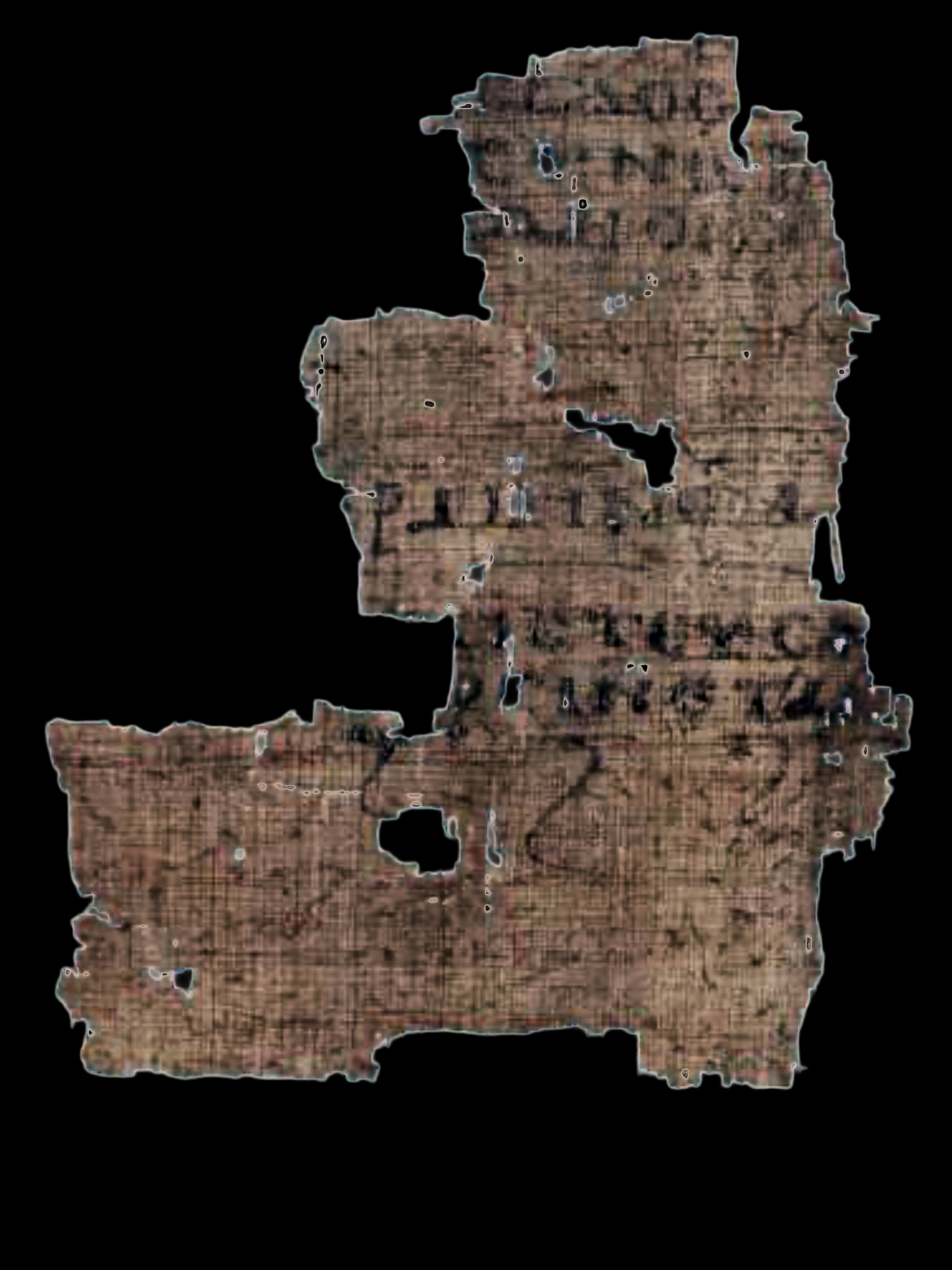
Verso, John 4:9

The Greek text of this codex is mixed. Aland placed it in Category III.

It is currently housed at the Österreichische Nationalbibliothek (Pap. Vindob. G. 36102) in Vienna.

== See also ==
- List of New Testament papyri
