= Papyrus 134 =

Papyrus manuscript

- New Testament manuscript
- Name: Willoughby Papyrus
- Sign: 𝔓^{134}
- Text: John 1:49-51; 2:1
- Date: c. 200-400
- Script: Greek
- Found: Antiquities Market, purchased by Harold R. Willoughby
- Now at: University of Texas Harry Ransom Center, Austin, Texas
- Cite: Geoffrey Smith, The Willoughby Papyrus: A New Fragment of John 1:49–2:1 (P134) and an Unidentified Christian Text, vol. 136, no. 4, p.935-958, Journal of Biblical Literature: Boston, MA, 2018.
- Type: Alexandrian
- Note: Written on a Scroll.

Papyrus 134 (designated as 𝔓^{134} in the Gregory-Aland numbering system) is a small surviving portion of an early copy of part of the New Testament in Greek. It is a papyrus manuscript of the Gospel of John. The text survives in three discontinuous fragments on one side of a scroll containing parts of verses 1:49-51 and 2:1. The manuscript has been assigned paleographically to the third or fourth century.

== Location ==
𝔓^{134} is housed at the University of Texas Harry Ransom Center, Austin, Texas, in the United States.

== Textual variants ==
- 1:49: According to the reconstruction of Smith, it reads ΒΑΣΙΛΕΥΣ ΕΙ (You are King) along with 𝔓^{75} 02 03 032, versus ΕΙ Ο ΒΑΣΙΛΕΥΣ (You are the King) found in 𝔓^{66} 01 Byz.
- 1:50: According to the reconstruction of Smith, it contains the majority reading ΜΕΙΖΩ versus ΜΕΙΖΩΝΑ of 𝔓^{66} and ΜΕΙΖΩΝ of 𝔓^{75}, all meaning "greater than".
- 1:51: It contains the Alexandrian reading without ΑΠ ΑΡΤΙ (from now on).
- 2:1: According to the reconstruction of Smith, it lacks ΤΗ ΗΜΕΡΑ (on the day), with 03.

== History ==
The manuscript was purchased on the antiquities market by Harold R. Willoughby, professor of early Christianity at the University of Chicago, before 1962. In 1990 it was passed it on to a relative in North Haverhill, NH, who listed it for sale on eBay in 2015. Geoffrey S. Smith, an associate professor and director of University of Texas at Austin's Institute for the Study of Antiquity and Christian Origins in the Department of Religious Studies, saw the listing and arranged for its purchase through the donation of a generous alumnus. It is the first New Testament continuous text that textual scholars have found written on the back of a scroll rather than in a codex, using the blank side of a scroll containing an unidentified Christian text.

== See also ==
- List of New Testament papyri
