= Papyrus 120 =

- New Testament manuscript
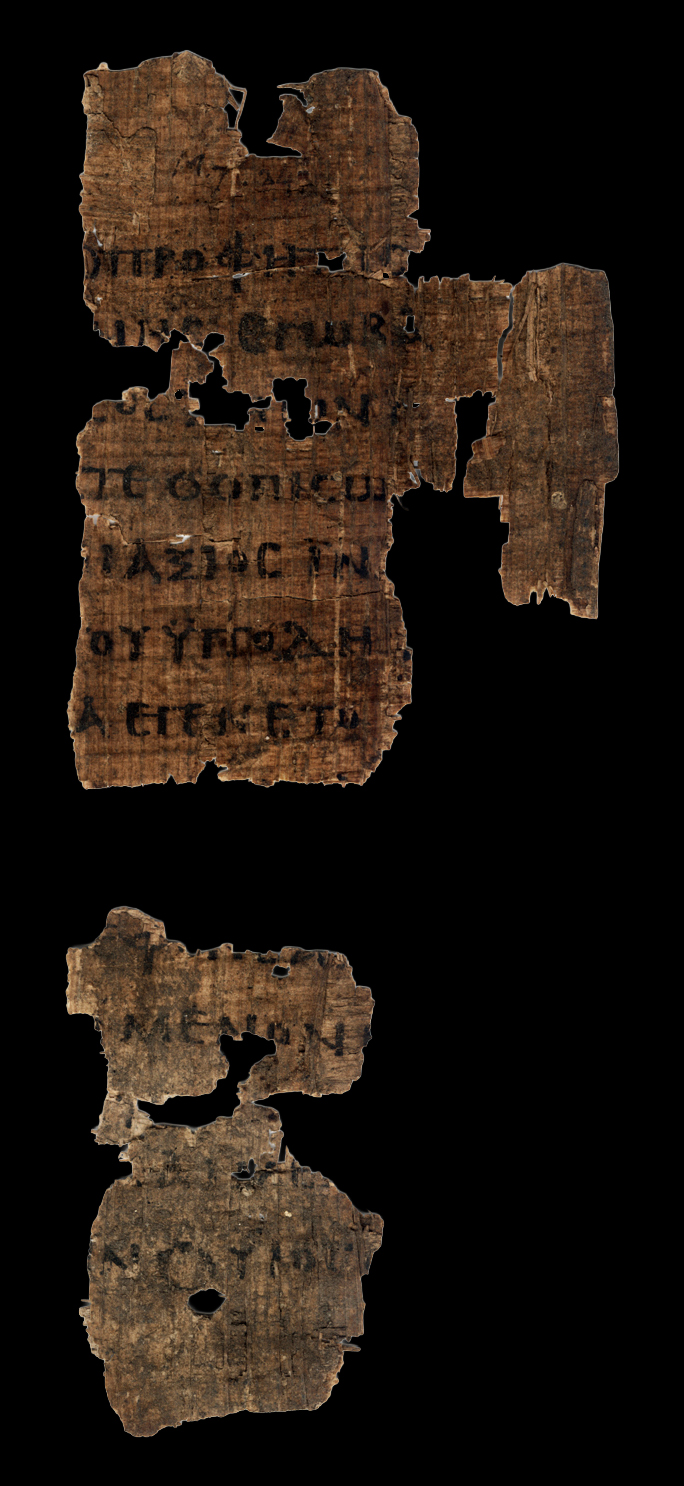
- Recto, John 1:25-28, 1:33-34
- Name: P. Oxy. 4804
- Sign: 𝔓^{120}
- Text: Gospel of John 1:25-28,38-44
- Date: 4th century
- Script: Greek
- Found: Oxyrhynchus, Egypt
- Now at: Sackler Library
- Cite: R. Hatzilambrou, P. J. Parsons, J. Chapa The Oxyrhynchus Papyri LXXI (London: 2007), pp. 6-9.
- Size: [20.5] x [11] cm
- Type: Alexandrian (?)
- Category: none

Papyrus 120, also known as P.Oxy. LXXI 4804, is an early copy of the New Testament in Greek. It is a papyrus manuscript of the Gospel of John in a fragmentary condition, only containing verses 1:25-28 and 1:38-44. It is designated by the siglum 𝔓^{120} in the Gregory-Aland numbering of New Testament manuscripts. Using the study of comparative writing styles (palaeography), it has been assigned by the INTF to the 4th century CE.

== Description ==
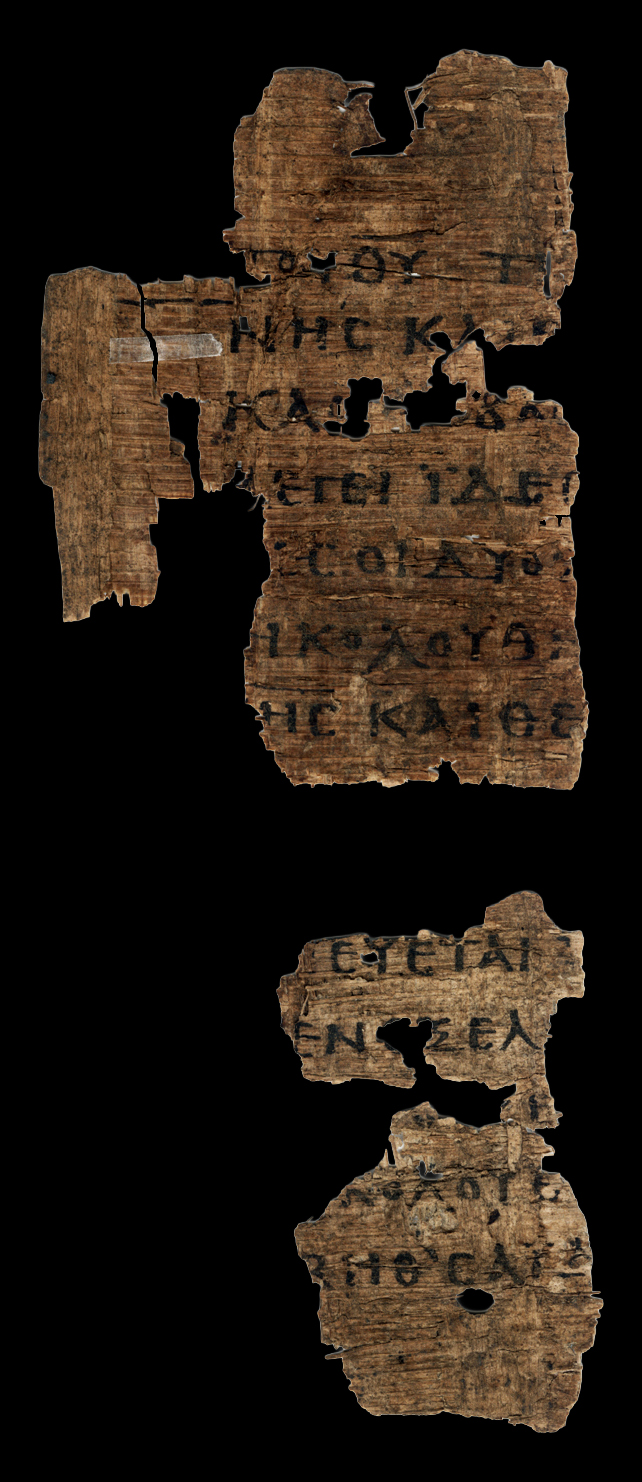
Verso, John 1:34-38, 1:42-44

The original manuscript was likely a codex (precursor to the modern book) made of papyrus, of which only three pieces from one leaf have survived. The text is written in one column per page, 27 lines per page, with 27-28 letters per line. The fragments do evidence the size of the margins of 2-3cm, which based on the 27 lines per pages would give the original codex a size of 11cm x20.5cm, with likely 95 pages in total to contain the Gospel of John. The copyist was likely a professional scribe, who wrote in a style known as Biblical Majuscule. The manuscript is currently housed at the Papyrology Rooms of the Sackler Library (shelf number P. Oxy. 4804) at Oxford.

== See also ==
- List of New Testament papyri
- Oxyrhynchus Papyri
