= Papyrus 129 =

- New Testament manuscript
- Sign: 𝔓^{129}
- Text: 1 Corinthians 7:34-37; 8:10-9:6; 9:12-16; 9:27-10:8
- Date: mid-2nd century AD
- Script: Greek
- Now at: University of Oxford, Sackler Library, Oxford, England
- Category: none

Papyrus 129 (in the Gregory-Aland numbering), designated as 𝔓^{129}, is what survives of a copy of the New Testament, specifically parts of the epistle of 1 Corinthians. It survives on two fragments of a papyrus codex manuscript. More information is available on the Kurzgefasste Liste.

== Location ==
In October 2019, while the two fragments were being held at the Museum of the Bible and in the Stimer Collection in California respectively, the Egypt Exploration Society (EES) claimed that the fragment held at the Museum of the Bible was removed without authorization from its collection by its general editor, Professor Dirk Obbink. Both fragments have now been returned to the EES and are now located at the Sackler Library in Oxford. The EES has commended the Museum of the Bible for its cooperation.

== See also ==
- List of New Testament papyri
