= Papyrus 93 =

- New Testament manuscript
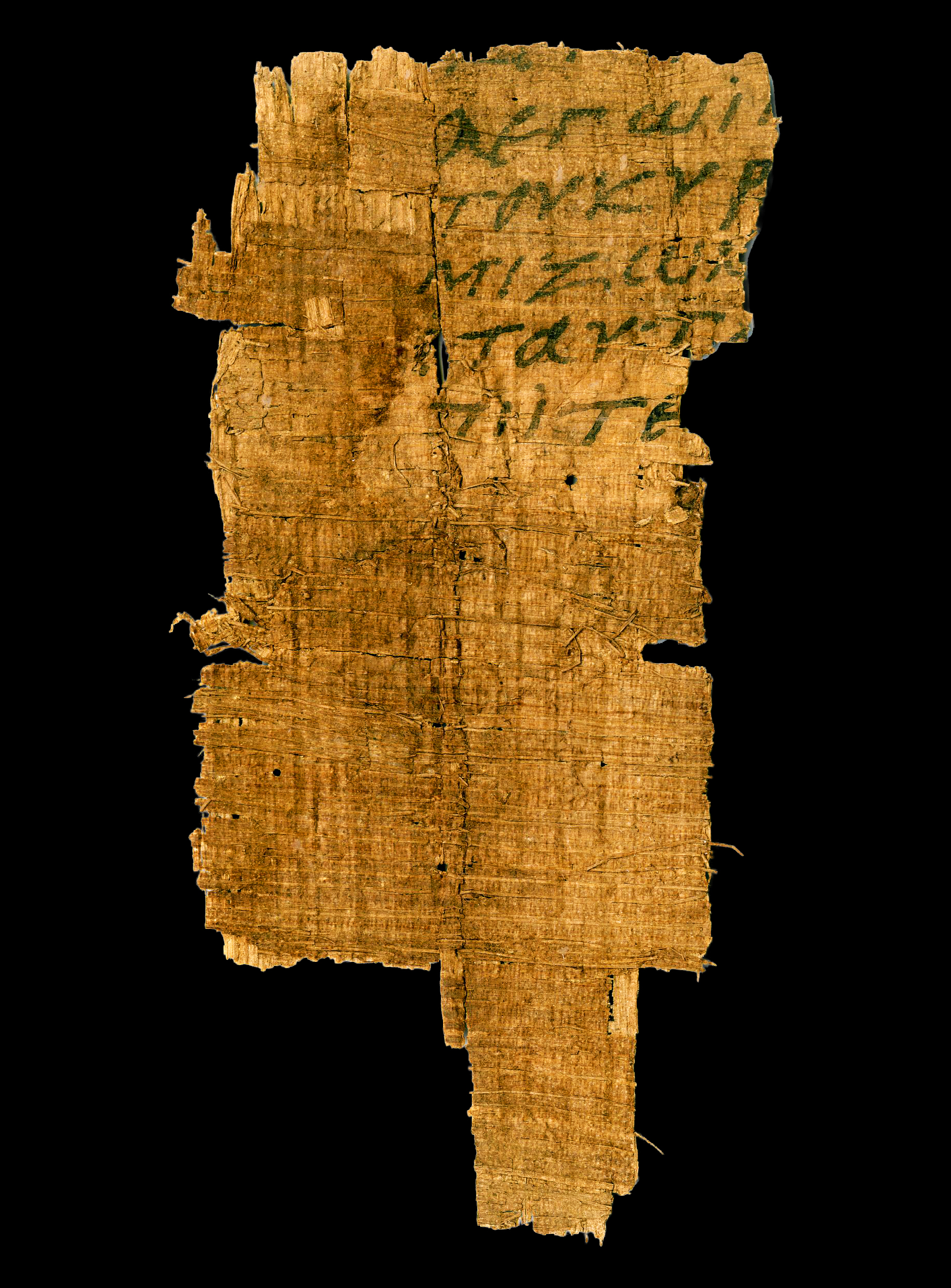
- recto John 13:15-17
- Sign: 𝔓^{93}
- Text: John 13 †
- Date: 5th century
- Script: Greek
- Now at: National Archaeological Museum, Florence
- Cite: G. Bastianini, Trenta testi greci 4 (1983), pp. 10-11
- Type: Alexandrian text-type

Papyrus 93 (in the Gregory-Aland numbering), designated by 𝔓^{93}, is a copy of the New Testament in Greek. It is a papyrus manuscript of the Gospel of John. The surviving texts of John are verses 13:15-17. The manuscript paleographically has been assigned to the middle 5th century.

Text

The Greek text of this manuscript is a representative of the Alexandrian text-type. It has not yet been placed in Aland's Categories of New Testament manuscripts.

Location

The manuscript is currently housed at the Girolamo Vitelli Papyrological Institute (PSI Inv. 108) at National Archaeological Museum in Florence.

== See also ==
- List of New Testament papyri
