= Papyrus 94 =

- New Testament manuscript
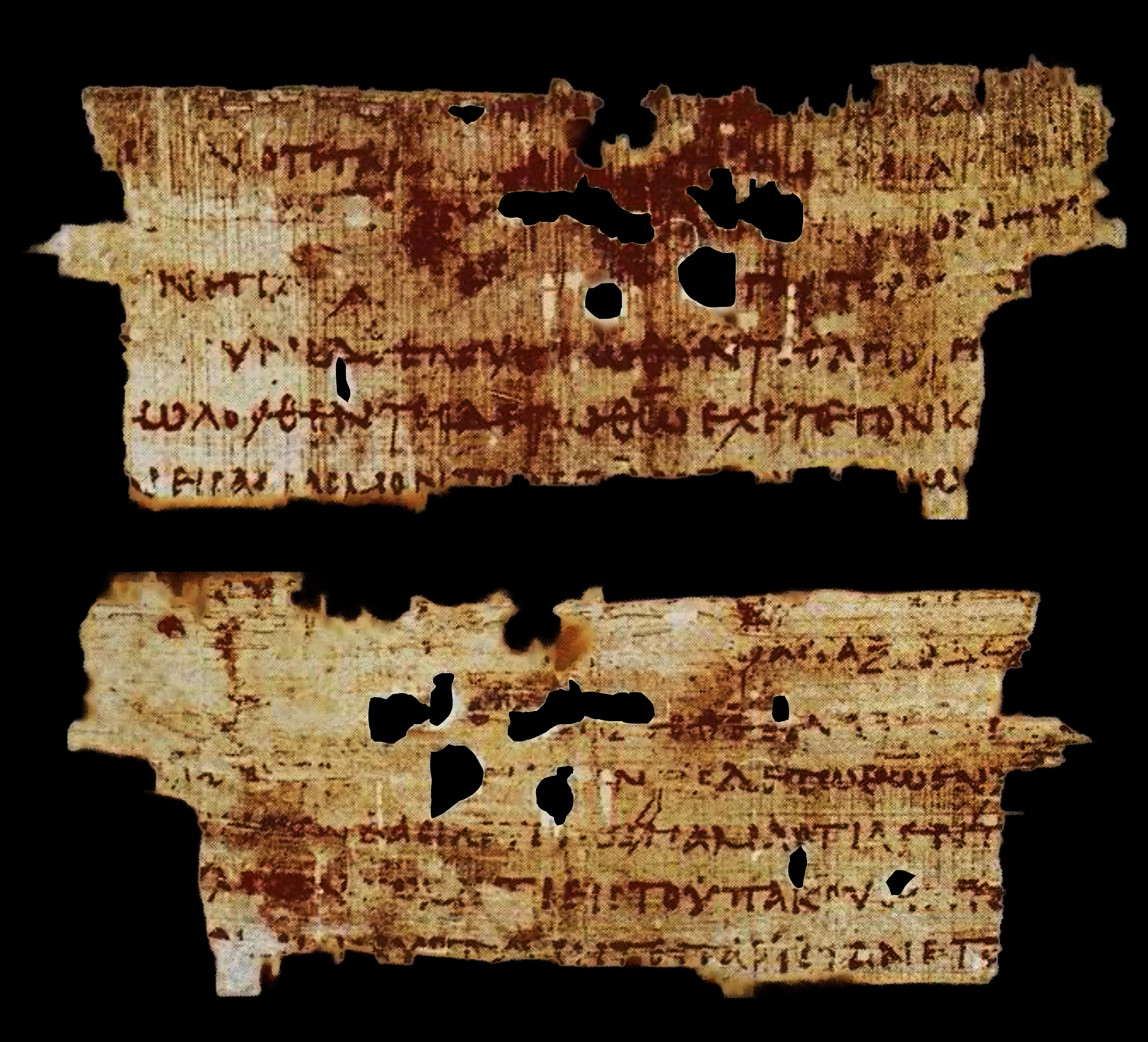
- Rom 6:10-13 (bottom-recto); Rom 6:19-21 (top-verso)
- Name: P. Cair. 10730
- Sign: 𝔓^{94}
- Text: Romans 6 †
- Date: 5th / 6th century
- Script: Greek
- Now at: Egyptian Museum, Cairo
- Cite: J. Bingen, Miscellània Papirologica Ramon Roca-Puig (1987), pp. 75-78
- Type: Alexandrian text-type

Papyrus 94 (in the Gregory-Aland numbering), designated by 𝔓^{94}, composes tiny fragments of the New Testament in Greek. It is papyrus fragments of the Epistle to the Romans chapter 6. The surviving texts are only Romans 6:10-13, 19–22.

The manuscript palaeographically has been assigned to the 5th century (or 6th century).

Text

The Greek text of this manuscript is a representative of the Alexandrian text-type. It has not yet been placed in one of Aland's Categories of New Testament manuscripts.

Location

The manuscript is currently housed at the Egyptian Museum (P. Cair. 10730) in Cairo.

An image of verses in Roman 6 can be found online at a site of The Center for the Study of New Testament manuscripts.

- List of New Testament papyri
