= Papyrus Oxyrhynchus 3929 =

One of four examples of libelli found at Oxyrhynchus in Egypt

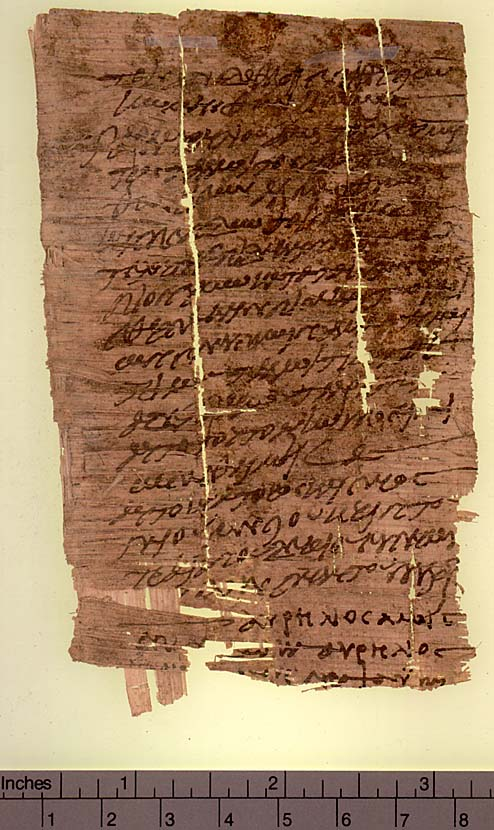
Papyrus Oxyrhynchus 3929, kept at the Sackler Library, Oxford.

POxy 3929 (or P. Oxy. LVIII 3929) is one of four examples of libelli found at Oxyrhynchus in Egypt. It is a certificate of sacrifice, serving as proof that the recipient satisfied the pagan commissioners during the Decian persecution of Christians. It was issued in the year 250.

== See also ==
- Lapsi (Christian)
- Oxyrhynchus papyri
- Other libelli: POxy 658, POxy 1464, POxy 2990
- Warrant to arrest a Christian: POxy 3035
