= Papyrus Oxyrhynchus 658 =

Ancient papyrus recovered from Egypt

Papyrus Oxyrhynchus 658 (P. Oxy. 658 or P. Oxy. IV 658) is one of four examples of libelli found at Oxyrhynchus in Egypt. The last lines of the manuscript declare the date — the first year of the emperor Decius, whose full name was Gaius Messius Quintus Traianus Decius.

== Text ==
- Original lines are retained (and numbered).
- Text in [brackets] is reconstructed to fill a gap (lacuna) in the papyrus.
- Full stops in brackets represent character spaces that cannot be reconstructed.
- Text in (parentheses) is full spelling of an abbreviation.
- Letters with _{subscript} dots are incomplete or indistinct.

1	τοῖς ἐπὶ τῶν ἱερῶν [καὶ]
2	θυσιῶν πόλ[εως]
3	παρ' Αὐρηλίου Λ̣[.....]
4	θίωνος Θεοδώρου μη[τρὸς]
5	Παντωνυμίδος ἀπὸ τ̣ῆ̣[ς]
6	αὐτῆς πόλεως. ἀεὶ μὲν
7	θύων καὶ σπένδων [τοῖ]ς
8	θεοῖς [δ]ιετέλ[εσα ἔ]τ̣ι̣ δ̣ὲ
9	καὶ νῦν ἐνώπιον ὑμῶν
10	κατὰ τὰ κελευσθ[έ]ν[τα]
11	ἔσπεισα καὶ ἔθυσα κα[ὶ]
12	τῶν ἱερῶν ἐγευσάμην
13	ἅμα τῷ υἱῷ μου Αὐρη-
14	λίῳ Διοσκόρῳ καὶ τῇ
15	θυγατρί μου Αὐρηλίᾳ
16	Λαίδ̣ι. ἀξιῶ ὑμᾶς ὑπο-
17	σημιώσασθαι μοι.
18	(ἔτους) 1 Αὐτοκράτορος Καίσαρος	During the first year of the Emperor Caesar
19	Γαίου Μεσσίου Κυίντου	Gaius Messius Quintus
20	Τραιανοῦ Δεκίου	Traianus Decius
21	Εὐσεβοῦ[ς Εὐ]τυχοῦς	Eusebius Eutychus
22	[Σεβασ]τοῦ [Παῦ]νι	Sebastian Pauni
23	[.....]ν̣( ) [ ? ]

== See also ==
- Lapsi (Christian)
- Oxyrhynchus papyri
- Other libelli: POxy 1464, POxy 2990, POxy 3929
- Warrant to arrest a Christian: POxy 3035
- Papyrus Oxyrhynchus 657
