= Papyrus 107 =

- New Testament manuscript
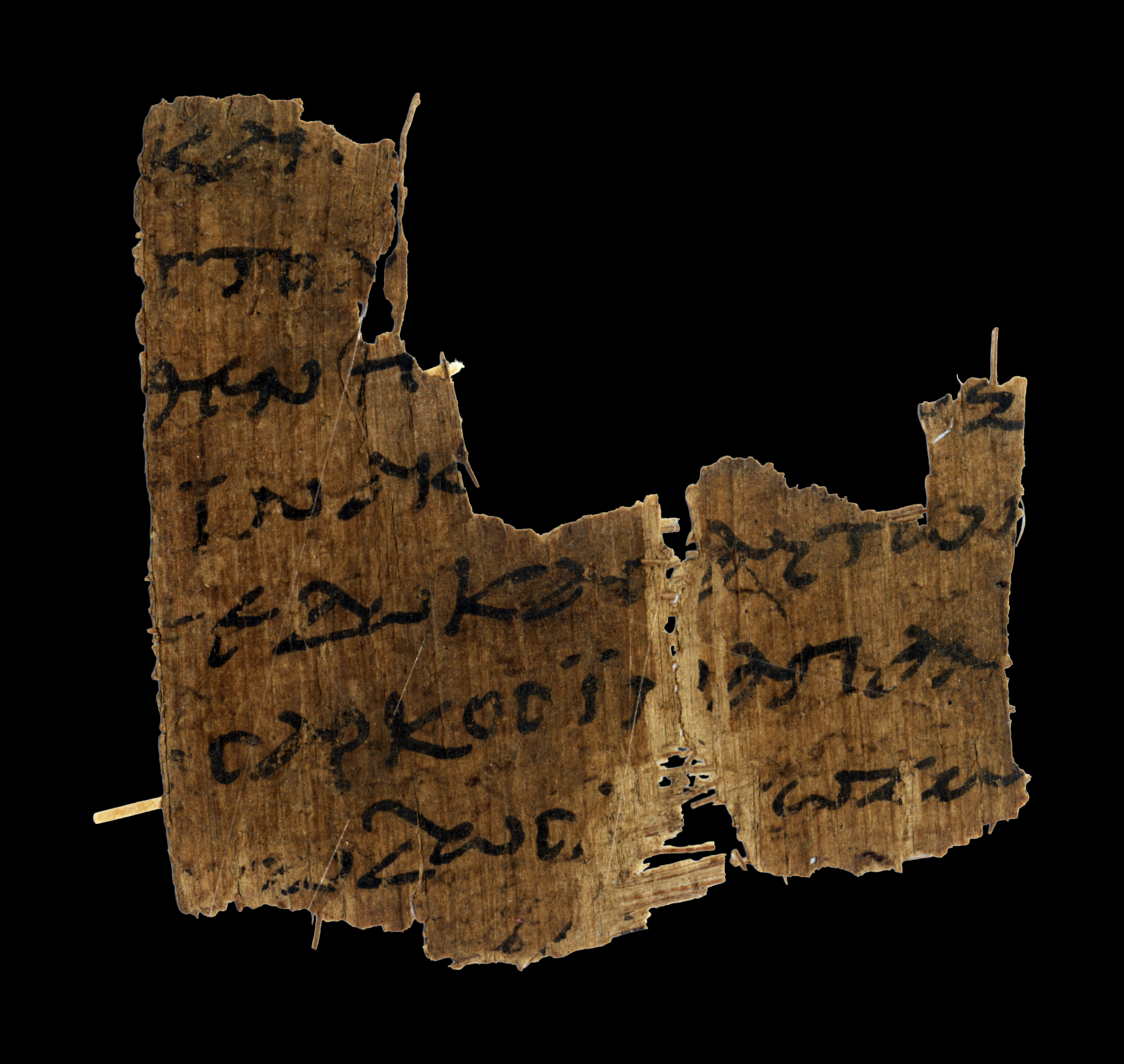
- Recto, John 17:1-2
- Name: P. Oxy. 4446
- Sign: 𝔓^{107}
- Text: Gospel of John 17:1-2,11
- Date: 3rd Century CE
- Script: Greek
- Found: Oxyrhynchus, Egypt
- Now at: Sackler Library
- Cite: W. E. H. Cockle, OP LXV (1997), pp. 14-16
- Size: 13 x 8.8 cm
- Type: Erratic
- Note: Agreement somewhat with W

Papyrus 107 is a copy of the New Testament in Greek. It is a papyrus manuscript of the Gospel of John, containing verses 17:1–2 & 17:11 in a fragmentary condition. It is designated by the siglum 𝔓^{107} in the Gregory-Aland numbering of New Testament manuscripts. Using the study of comparative writing styles (paleography), it has been assigned to the early 3rd century CE. The manuscript is currently housed at the Sackler Library (Papyrology Rooms, P. Oxy. LXV 4446) at Oxford.

== Description ==
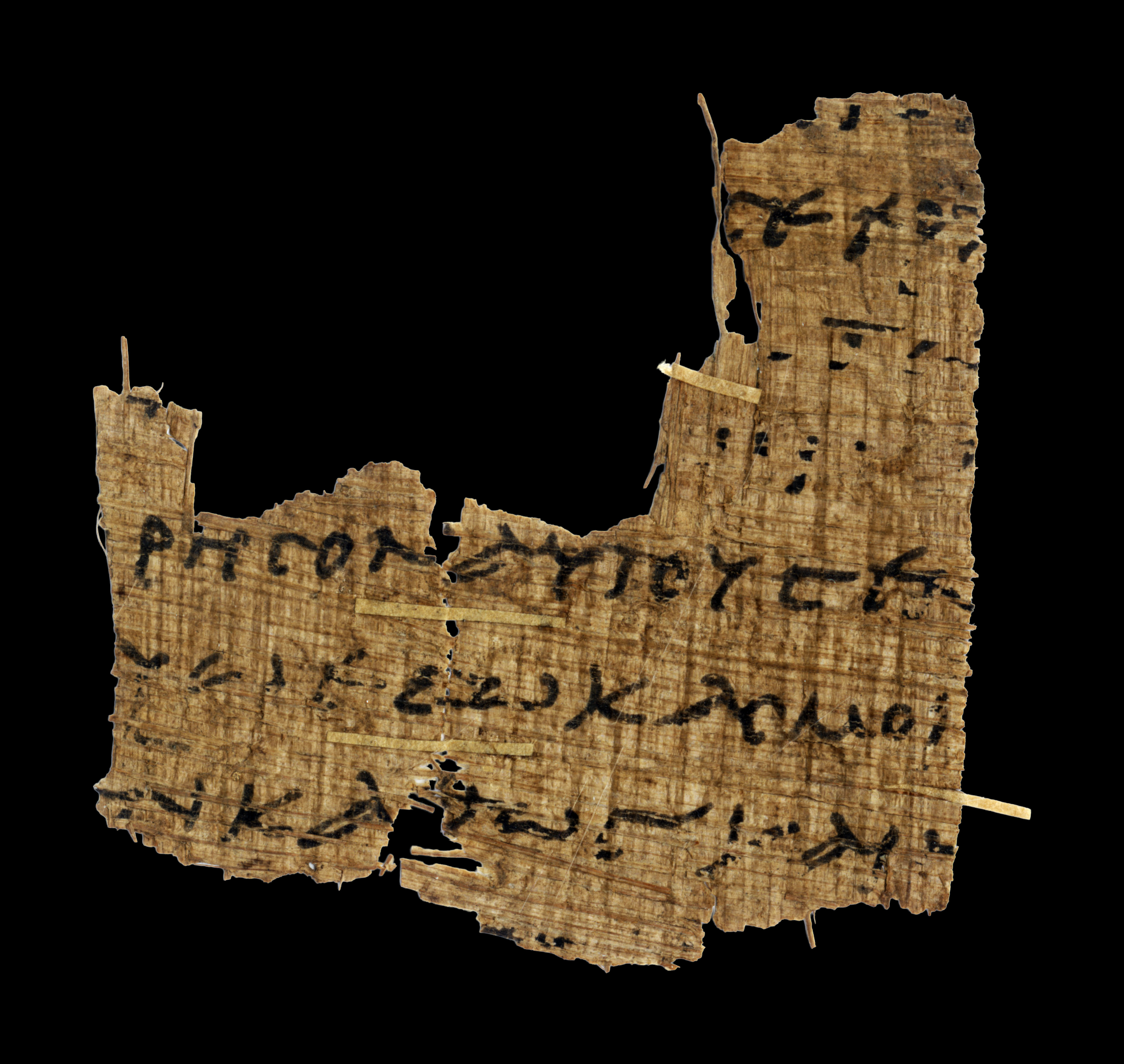
Verso, John 17:11

The original manuscript would've had around 33 lines per page. The extant portion is too small to determine height and width. The handwriting script is either documentary or common. The text is erratic, and doesn't really agree with any major text-type, bearing most resemblance with Codex Washingtonianus (W).

== Textual variants ==
John 17:1

και ο υ̅ς̅ (υιος) (and the Son): 𝔓^{107}
και ο υ̅ς̅ (υιος) σου (and your Son): C^{(2).3} L Ψ f^{13} 33 $\mathfrak{M}$ q vg^{mss}; Or^{pt}
ο υ̅ς̅ (υιος) (the Son): א B C^{*} W 0109 0301 pc d e ff^{2} pbo; Or^{pt}
ο υ̅ς̅ (υιος) σου (your Son): A D Θ 0250 1 579 l 844 pc lat sy

John 17:2 (1)

δως (give): 𝔓^{107} W L
δωση (may give): א^{2} A C K 0250 33 al
δωσω (shall give): 0109 א^{*} pc
δωσει (he gives): B Ψ 0301 f^{13} $\mathfrak{M}$
εχη (may have): D

John 17:2 (2)

αυτω (to him): 𝔓^{107} א^{*} W 0109 pc
αυτοις (to them): א^{2} A B C K Ψ 0250 0301 f^{13} $\mathfrak{M}$ 33 al
omit. : D

John 17:11 (1)

ουκετι ειμι εν τω κοσμω και εν τω κοσμω ειμι (no longer am I in the world and in the world I am)

incl. : 𝔓^{107(vid)} D (a c) r1
omit. : 𝔓^{66} א A B C L K W Θ Ψ $\mathfrak{M}$

John 17:11 (2)

ω εδωκας (to whom have been given): 𝔓^{107(vid)} 𝔓^{66} א L W 579 pc
ω δεδωκας (to whom have been given): 𝔓^{60} A B C Θ Ψ f^{13} 1 $\mathfrak{M}$
ο δεδωκας (who has been given): D^{*} 1424 pc
ους δεδωκας (to those whom have been given): D^{1} (N) 209 892^{s} al aur f q vg

John 17:11 (2)

εν καθως και ημεις (in this way also we): 𝔓^{107} 𝔓^{66}^{c(vid)} B Θ 579 700 l 844 al aur f vg syh
εν καθως ημεις (in this way, we): 𝔓^{60} א A C D $\mathfrak{M}$
omit. : 𝔓^{66}^{*} it ac2

== See also ==
- List of New Testament papyri
- Oxyrhynchus Papyri
- Gospel of John: chapter 17
