= Papyrus Oxyrhynchus 1464 =

Roman document from 250AD on pagan sacrifice

POxy 1464 (or P. Oxy. XII 1464) is a document that was found at the city of Oxyrhynchus in Egypt. This document was given to a Roman citizen to certify performance of a pagan sacrifice, hence demonstrating loyalty to the authorities of the Roman Empire. Such a document is called a libellus (plural libelli), and this was one of four libelli found at Oxyrhynchus.

The manuscript declares the date — the first year of the emperor Decius, whose full name was Gaius Messius Quintus Traianus Decius. We know the first year of his reign was 250 AD. The day and month are also given as the third of Epeiph or Epip in the Coptic calendar. So this libellus was issued on 27 June 250 AD.

== Text ==
- Original lines are retained (and numbered).
- Text in [brackets] is reconstructed to fill a gap (lacuna) in the papyrus.
- Text in (parentheses) is full spelling of an abbreviation.
- Letters with _{subscript} dots are incomplete or indistinct.

1	[τοῖς] ἐπὶ τῶν θυσιῶν αἱρεθεῖσι τῆς	For those who partook of the sacrifices from the
2	[Ὀ]ξυρυγχε̣ιτῶν πόλεως	city of Oxyrhynchus
3	∥ὰ Αὐρηλίου Γαιῶνος Ἀμμωνίου	These are Aurelius Gaionus Ammonius
4	[μη]τρὸς Ταεῦτος. ἀεὶ μὲν θύειν καὶ	[and the] mother of Taeutus. Indeed always making sacrifice and
5	[σπέ]νδειν καὶ σέ̣β̣ειν θεοῖς εἰθισμένος	libation and worship to the gods being accustomed
6	[κατ]ὰ τὰ κελευσθέντα ὑπὸ τῆς θείας κρίσεως	according to those justly urged by the aunt
7	[καὶ] νῦν ἐνώπιον ὑμῶν θύων καὶ σπέν-	and now in front of you all making sacrifice and libation
8	[δω]ν καὶ γευ[σ]άμενος τῶν ἱερείων ἅμα	and having tasted the holy meat portions at the same time
9	[Τ̣α̣]ῶτ̣ι̣ γυναικὶ [κ]αὶ Ἀμμωνίῳ καὶ Ἀμμω-	for a woman and for Ammonius and Ammoeanus
10	∍α̣ν̣ῷ̣ υἱοῖς καὶ Θ̣έκ̣λ̣ᾳ θυγατρὶ δι' ἐμοῦ κ̣[α]ὶ	son and Thekla daughter by me and
11	[ἀξι]ῶ ὑποσημειώσασθαί μοι. (ἔτους) 1	I think are worthy to be recorded by me. During the first year of
12	[Αὐ]τοκράτορος Κ[α]ί̣[σαρο]ς Γαίου Μεσσίου	Autokrator Caesar Gaius Messius
13	[Κυί]ντου Τ[ρ]αιανοῦ Δεκίου Εὐσεβοῦς	Quintus Traianus Decius Eusebius
14	[Εὐ]τυχοῦς Σεβαστοῦ Ἐπεὶφ 3. Αὐρή[λιος]	Eutychus Sebastian, Epeiph 3. Aurelius
15	[Γαι]ὼν ἐπιδέδωκα. Αὐρήλ(ιος) Σαραπίων	Gaionus I have vouched for. Aurelius Sarapion,
16	[ὁ κ(αὶ)] Χαιρήμων ἔγρ[αψα] ὑπὲρ αὐτοῦ μ̣ὴ̣ [εἰδό]-	he and Chairemon, I wrote above him, my letters
17	[τος] γράμματα.	being known.
v
10 lines
??	Βησᾶς, Ψεναμοῦνις	Besas, Psenamounis

== See also ==
- Lapsi (Christian)
- Oxyrhynchus papyri
- Other libelli: POxy 658, POxy 2990, POxy 3929
- Warrant to arrest a Christian: POxy 3035
