= Papyrus Oxyrhynchus 2990 =

POxy 2990 (or P. Oxy. XLI 2990) is one of four examples of libelli found at Oxyrhynchus in Egypt.

== Text ==
- Original lines are retained (and numbered).
- Text in [brackets] is reconstructed to fill a gap (lacuna) in the papyrus.
- Text in (parentheses) is full spelling of an abbreviation.
- Letters with _{subscript} dots are incomplete or indistinct.

1	[Α]ὐρ(ήλιος) Ἡρακ̣λ̣[ε]ί̣δ̣η̣[ς]	Aurelius Heraclides
2	εἶδον ὑμᾶς θύοντας	I saw you [pl.] sacrificing [m.pl.]
3	κ̣α̣ὶ̣ γευομέ̣νους.	and tasting [m.pl.].
4	Μ(άρκος) Αὐ(ρήλιος) Σεσονγῶσις	Markus Aurelius Sesongosis
5	καὶ ὡς χρηματίζω εἶδον	also likewise I certify I saw
6	ὑμᾶς θύοντας καὶ {γε}	you sacrificing [m.pl.] and {also}
7	γευσαμένους	tasting [m.pl.]
8	τῶν ἱερείων.	the holy meat portions.

== See also ==
- Lapsi (Christian)
- Oxyrhynchus papyri
- Other libelli: POxy 658, POxy 1464, POxy 3929
- Warrant to arrest a Christian: POxy 3035
