= Papyrus 112 =

- New Testament manuscript
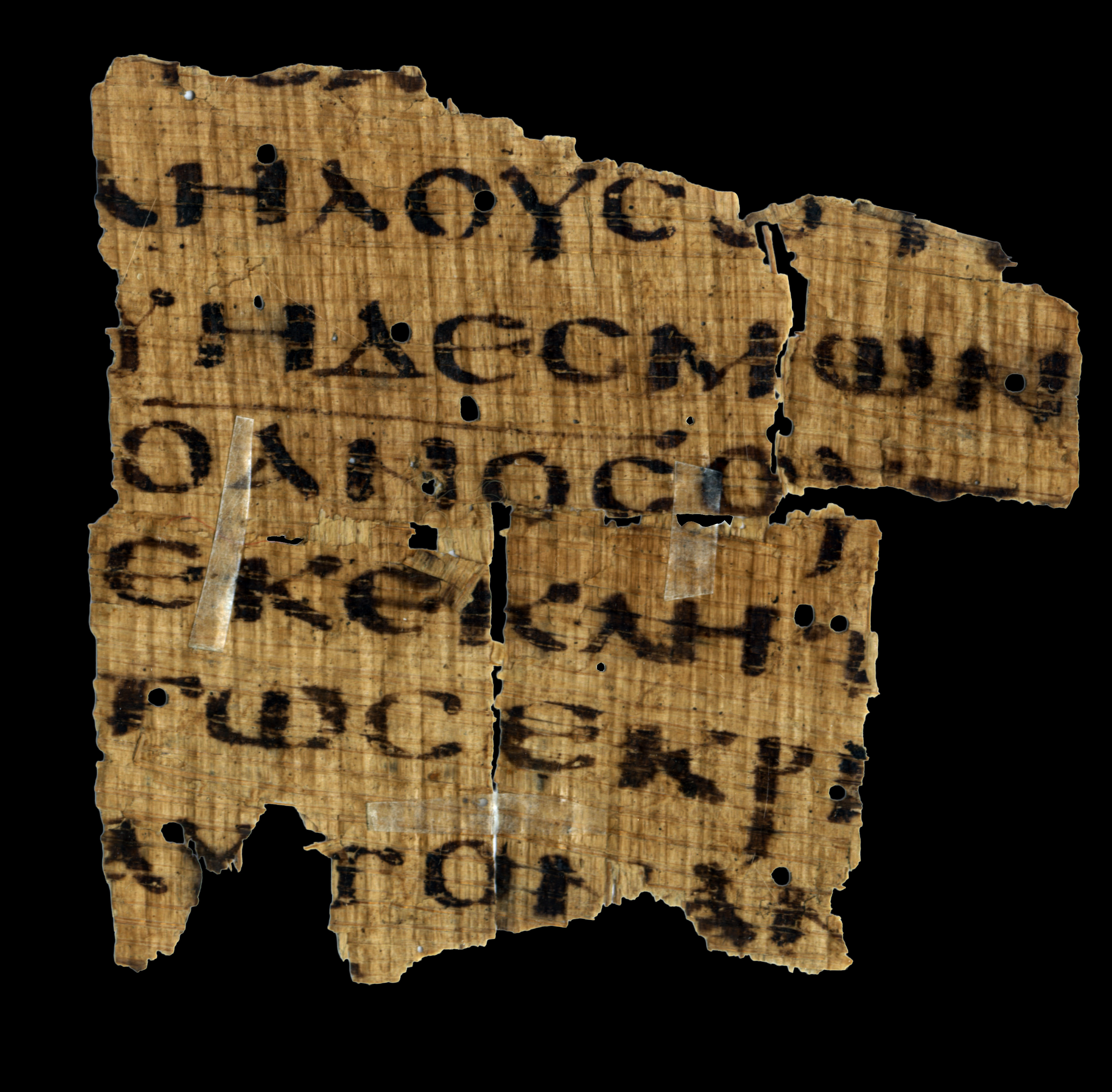
- Recto, Acts 26:31-32
- Name: P. Oxy. 4496
- Sign: 𝔓^{112}
- Text: Acts of the Apostles 26:31-32; 27:5-7
- Date: 5th century
- Script: Greek
- Found: Oxyrhynchus, Egypt
- Now at: Sackler Library
- Cite: W. E. H. Cockle, OP LXVI (1999), pp. 5-7
- Size: [31] x [18] cm
- Type: unknown
- Category: none
- Note: unique variant in Acts 27:7

Papyrus 112 (in the Gregory-Aland numbering), designated by 𝔓^{112}, is a fragment from a portion of the New Testament in Greek. It is a papyrus manuscript from the Acts of the Apostles. The surviving portions are parts of Acts 26:31-32 and, on the other side of the sheet, Acts 27:6-7. It is written in uncial characters of uniform size, without any diacritical marks or spacing between words. ὁ ἄνθρωπος ('the man') is written in the Nomen Sacrum form ὁ ἄνος, with a single overline. Based on palaeography, the manuscript has been assigned to the 5th century by the INTF.

The manuscript is currently housed at the Sackler Library (Papyrology Rooms, P. Oxy. 4496) at Oxford.

== Text ==
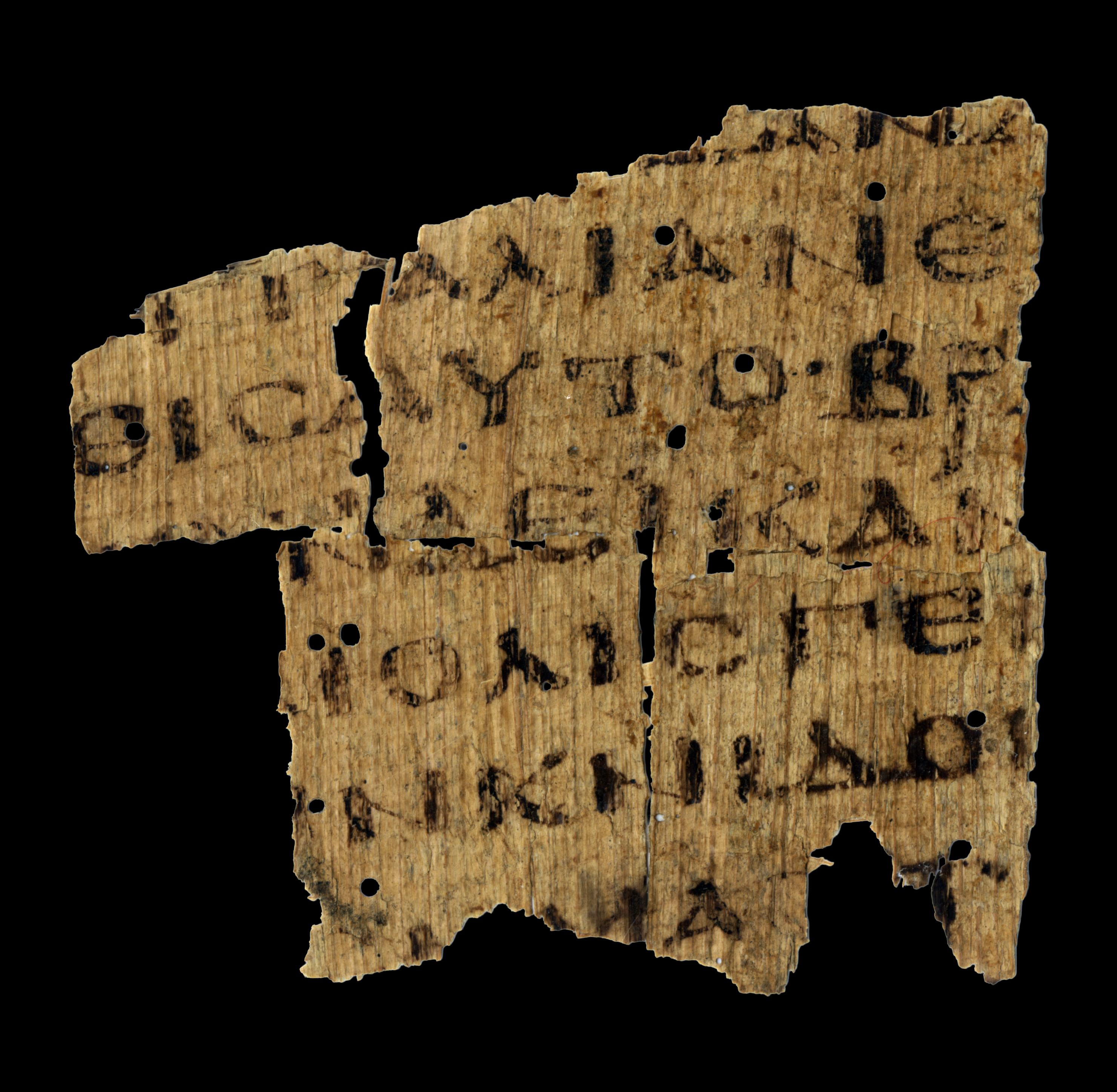
Verso, Acts 27:6-7

In Acts 26:31 it appears to be missing τι, which is found in only about a dozen Greek manuscripts, including Codex Sinaiticus and Codex Alexandrinus (but not Codex Vaticanus), and is supported by most manuscripts of the Latin Vulgate (but not the Old Latin).

Following ὁ ἄνος οὗτ[ος] (this man) at the end of Acts 26:31, it skips to the next ὁ ἄνος οὗτος (this man) in the following verse, leaving out Ἀγρίππας δὲ τῷ Φήστῳ ἔφη, Ἀπολελύσθαι ἐδύνατο (And Agrippa said to Festus, "Could have been set free"). This is also done in Greek minuscules 326 and 2464.

Following Acts 26:32 it has [καὶ οὕ]τως ἔκρι[νεν ὁ ἡγεμὼν] αὐτὸν ἀν[απεμψαι]. This is slightly transposed from a reading also found in the Greek minuscules 97 and 421, supported by the Old Latin h and a textual note in the margin of the Harclean Syriac.

In Acts 27:7 it has the transposition βρα[δυπλοουντε]ς εν δε ικαν[αις ημεραις. Αll other witnesses have this sentence in the word order: εν ικαναις δε ημεραις βραδυπλοουντες.

== See also ==
- List of New Testament papyri
- Oxyrhynchus Papyri
