= Libellus =

Government documents of the Roman Empire

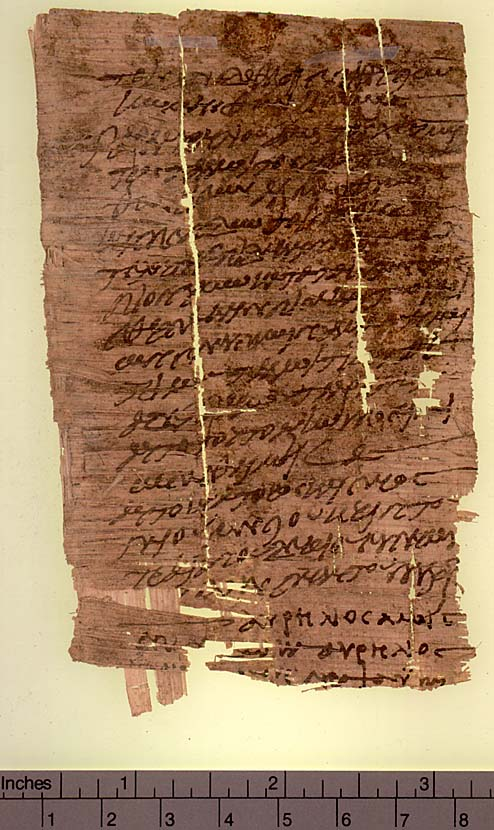
Papyrus Oxyrhynchus 3929, a libellus from the Decian persecution, found in Oxyrhynchus in Egypt.

A libellus (plural libelli) in the Roman Empire was any brief document written on individual pages (as opposed to scrolls or tablets), particularly official documents issued by governmental authorities.

The term libellus has particular historical significance for the libelli that were issued during the reign of Emperor Decius to citizens to certify performance of required pagan sacrifices in order to demonstrate loyalty to the authorities of the Roman Empire. During later periods libelli were issued as certificates of indulgence, in which the confessors or martyrs interceded for apostate Christians.

== Etymology ==
The word libellus is a Latin diminutive form of the ordinary word liber (meaning "book"), from which we get the English word library. Literally, it means "little book". Sometimes the word was used to describe what we would call: essays, tracts, pamphlets, or petitions.

== History ==
=== During the Decian persecution ===
In the year 250, in an attempt to promote traditional Roman pietas and unify the Empire, the Emperor Decian decreed that everyone, (excepting the Jews), must sacrifice and burn incense to the gods in the presence of a magistrate, and obtain a signed document witnessed by the officials attesting to this. The libellus was the statement of the individual of his/her loyalty to the Empire, the fact that they had rendered the required sacrifice, plus a request for the officials to countersign as witnesses.

"Forty-six such certificates have been published, all dating from this same year [250 AD]." This coincides with the Decian persecution. Four libelli were found among the thousands of papyri at the archaeological site near Oxyrhynchus in Egypt (P. Oxy. 658, P. Oxy. 1464, P. Oxy. 2990 and P. Oxy. 3929). A number of these certificates still exist and one discovered in Egypt reads:

1	[τοῖς] ἐπὶ τῶν θυσιῶν αἱρεθεῖσι τῆς	For those who partook of the sacrifices from the
2	[Ὀ]ξυρυγχε̣ιτῶν πόλεως	city of Oxyrhynchus
3	∥ὰ Αὐρηλίου Γαιῶνος Ἀμμωνίου	These are Aurelius Gaionus Ammonius
4	[μη]τρὸς Ταεῦτος. ἀεὶ μὲν θύειν καὶ	[and the] mother of Taeutus. Indeed always making sacrifice and
5	[σπέ]νδειν καὶ σέ̣β̣ειν θεοῖς εἰθισμένος	libation and worship to the gods being accustomed
6	[κατ]ὰ τὰ κελευσθέντα ὑπὸ τῆς θείας κρίσεως	according to those justly urged by the aunt
7	[καὶ] νῦν ἐνώπιον ὑμῶν θύων καὶ σπέν-	and now in front of you all making sacrifice and libation
8	[δω]ν καὶ γευ[σ]άμενος τῶν ἱερείων ἅμα	and having tasted the holy meat portions at the same time
9	[Τ̣α̣]ῶτ̣ι̣ γυναικὶ [κ]αὶ Ἀμμωνίῳ καὶ Ἀμμω-	for a woman and for Ammonius and Ammoeanus
10	∍α̣ν̣ῷ̣ υἱοῖς καὶ Θ̣έκ̣λ̣ᾳ θυγατρὶ δι' ἐμοῦ κ̣[α]ὶ	son and Thekla daughter by me and
11	[ἀξι]ῶ ὑποσημειώσασθαί μοι. (ἔτους) 1	I think are worthy to be recorded by me. During the first year of
12	[Αὐ]τοκράτορος Κ[α]ί̣[σαρο]ς Γαίου Μεσσίου	Autokrator Caesar Gaius Messius
13	[Κυί]ντου Τ[ρ]αιανοῦ Δεκίου Εὐσεβοῦς	Quintus Traianus Decius Eusebius
14	[Εὐ]τυχοῦς Σεβαστοῦ Ἐπεὶφ 3. Αὐρή[λιος]	Eutychus Sebastian, Epeiph 3. Aurelius
15	[Γαι]ὼν ἐπιδέδωκα. Αὐρήλ(ιος) Σαραπίων	Gaionus I have vouched for. Aurelius Sarapion,
16	[ὁ κ(αὶ)] Χαιρήμων ἔγρ[αψα] ὑπὲρ αὐτοῦ μ̣ὴ̣ [εἰδό]-	he and Chairemon, I wrote above him, my letters
17	[τος] γράμματα.	being known.
v
10 lines
??	Βησᾶς, Ψεναμοῦνις	Besas, Psenamounis

Participating in pagan sacrifices was a sin for Christians and punished by excommunication, because the New Testament forbade Christians to participate in "idol feasts". However, not participating made one liable to arrest by the Roman authorities. A warrant to arrest a Christian (P. Oxy. 3035) was also found at Oxyrhynchus, this too has been dated precisely—to the year 256. The grounds for this arrest are not documented, however, and it predates the persecution under the emperor Valerian by about a year.

=== Libella pacis ===
The lapsi of Carthage persuaded certain Confessors of the Faith who had remained faithful in the face of torture and imprisonment to send letters of recommendation in the name of the dead martyrs (libella pacis/"letters of peace") to the bishop endorsing the position that those who had lapsed be restored to communion with the Church. Bishop Cyprian debated whether the threat of the death penalty mitigated the sin of having communion with idols, leaving room for forgiveness and restoration to the Christian community.

== See also ==
- Lapsi (Christian)
- Libellus de Medicinalibus Indorum Herbis
- Novatianism
- Oxyrhynchus papyri
