= Heracles Papyrus =

Ancient Greek manuscript

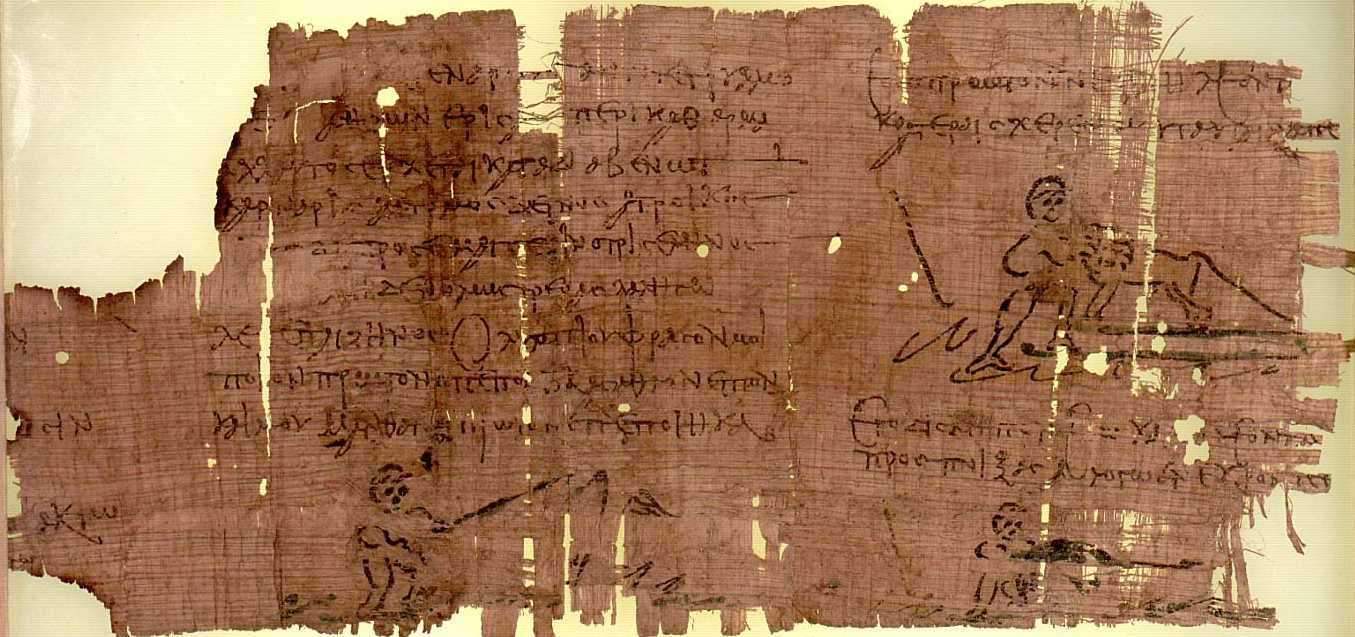
The Heracles Papyrus.

The Heracles Papyrus (Bodleian Art, Archaeology and Ancient World Library, University of Oxford, Papyrus Oxyrhynchus 2331) is a fragment of a 3rd-century Greek manuscript of a poem about the Labours of Heracles. It contains three unframed colored line drawings of the first of the Labors, the killing of the Nemean lion, set within the columns of cursive text. It was found at Oxyrhynchus (Pap. 2331) and is one of the few surviving scraps of classical literary illustration on papyrus. The fragment measures 235 by 106 mm.
