= Oxyrhynchus Papyri =

Manuscript fragments from 32BC–640AD found in an Egyptian rubbish dump

Grenfell (left) and Hunt (right) in about 1896

Site where the Oxyrhynchus Papyri were discovered

Excavations at Oxyrhynchus 1, c. 1903.

The Oxyrhynchus Papyri are a group of manuscripts discovered during the late nineteenth and early twentieth centuries by papyrologists Bernard Pyne Grenfell and Arthur Surridge Hunt at an ancient rubbish dump near Oxyrhynchus in Egypt (28°32′N 30°40′E, modern el-Bahnasa).

The manuscripts date from the time of the Ptolemaic (3rd century BC) and Roman periods of Egyptian history (from 32 BC to the Muslim conquest of Egypt in 640 AD).

Only an estimated 10% are literary in nature. Most of the papyri found seem to consist mainly of public and private documents: codes, edicts, registers, official correspondence, census-returns, tax-assessments, petitions, court-records, sales, leases, wills, bills, accounts, inventories, horoscopes, and private letters.

Although most of the papyri were written in Greek, some texts written in Egyptian (Egyptian hieroglyphics, Hieratic, Demotic, mostly Coptic), Latin and Arabic were also found. Texts in Hebrew, Aramaic, Syriac and Pahlavi have so far represented only a small percentage of the total.

Since 1898, academics have collated and transcribed over 5,000 documents from what were originally hundreds of boxes of papyrus fragments the size of large cornflakes. This is thought to represent only 1 to 2% of what is estimated to be at least half a million papyri still remaining to be conserved, transcribed, deciphered and catalogued. The most recent published volume was Vol. LXXXVIII, released on 1st of May 2025.

Oxyrhynchus Papyri are currently housed in institutions all over the world. A substantial number are housed in the Bodleian Art Library at Oxford University. There is an online table of contents briefly listing the type of contents of each papyrus or fragment.

== Administrative texts ==
Administrative documents assembled and transcribed from the Oxyrhynchus excavation encompass a wide variety of legal matters, such as marriages, employment contracts, and censuses. Some of the more notable papyri transcribed so far include:

- The contract of a wrestler agreeing to throw his next match for a fee.
- Various and sundry ancient recipes for treating haemorrhoids, hangovers and cataracts.
- Details of a grain dole mirroring a similar program in the Roman capital.
- Tryphon and Saraeus:
  - Tryphon, son of Dionysus, and Saraeus, daughter of Apion, a married couple are mentioned in several administrative papyri, detailing their various brushes with legal authorities in Oxyrhynchus.
  - However, before Tryphon married Saraeus, he had a wife called Demetrous, daughter of Heraclides. After their divorce, Tryphon complains to the strategus, Alexander, that she has stolen several of his belongings. The papyrus is too damaged, however, to correctly ascertain what these are.
  - In 37 CE, the couple appears in a marriage contract, almost entirely concerned with Saraeus' dowry. Most surviving marriage contracts keep similar detail on dowries and other assets, in case of divorce.
  - However Tryphon's first wife, it seems, had not forgiven him. The same year as his second marriage, he petitions the strategus again, this time alleging that Demetrous and her mother have attacked Saraeus. The response from the strategus, Sotas, is unknown.
  - In 49 CE, Saraeus was summoned before the strategus as part of a case between her and an employer. She has been contracted as a wet-nurse for a foundling, who had died during her employment. Pesouris, her employer, accused her of kidnapping the child to pose as her own. Paison, the strategus, ruled that the living child was Saraeus', and that in return she must pay back her wages.
  - However, several months, later, Tryphon is petitioning Capito, the praefectus, complaining that Saraeus' former employer is refusing to co-operate with Paison's ruling, and 'hinders [Tryphon] in [his] trade'.
  - In 51 CE, Tryphon files another complaint, presumably to the strategus, that he and Saraeus were attacked by unnamed women in the street.

In addition to detailing the cases themselves, these legal documents provide insight into everyday life under Graeco-Roman Egypt, and are often overlooked beside its pharaonic predecessor. For example, Saraeus' hearing with strategus Paison reveal that courts used the Roman names for year, marked by the reign of the emperor, but maintained the Egyptian months, called Pharmouthi.

== Secular texts ==
Although most of the texts uncovered at Oxyrhynchus were non-literary in nature, the archaeologists succeeded in recovering a large corpus of literary works that had previously been thought to have been lost. Many of these texts had previously been unknown to modern scholars.

=== Greek ===
Several fragments can be traced to the work of Plato, for instance the Republic, Phaedo, or the dialogue Gorgias, dated around 200–300 CE.

==== Historiography ====
The discovery of a historical work known as the Hellenica Oxyrhynchia also revealed new information about classical antiquity. The identity of the author of the work is unknown; many early scholars proposed that it may have been written by Ephorus or Theopompus, but many modern scholars are now convinced that it was written by Cratippus. The work has won praise for its style and accuracy and has even been compared favorably with the works of Thucydides.

==== Mathematics ====
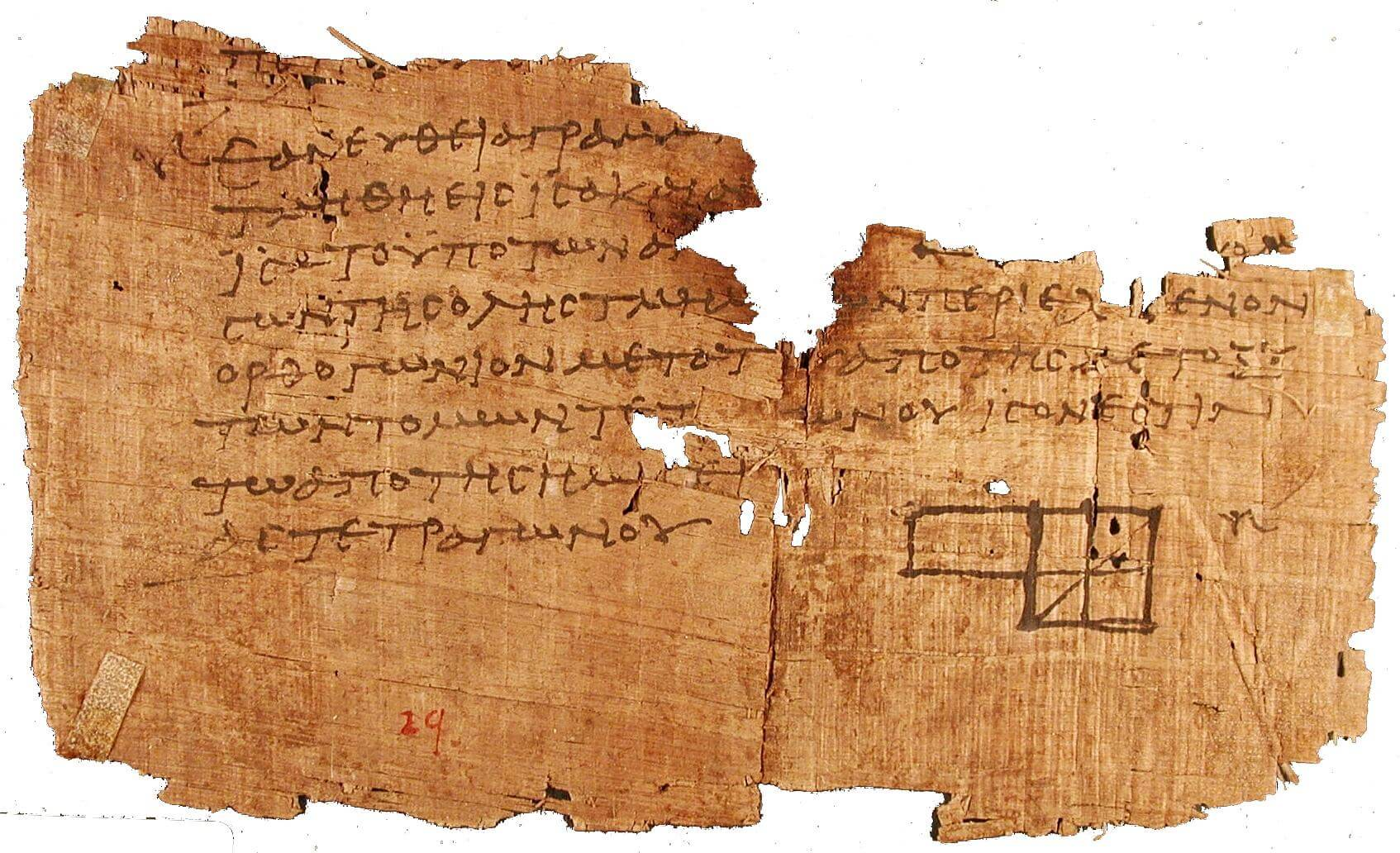
One of the oldest surviving fragments of Euclid's Elements, found at Oxyrhynchus and dated to circa AD 100 (P. Oxy. 29). The diagram accompanies Book II, Proposition 5.

The findings at Oxyrhynchus also turned up the oldest and most complete diagrams from Euclid's Elements. Fragments of Euclid led to a re-evaluation of the accuracy of ancient sources for The Elements, revealing that the version of Theon of Alexandria has more authority than previously believed, according to Thomas Little Heath.

==== Drama ====
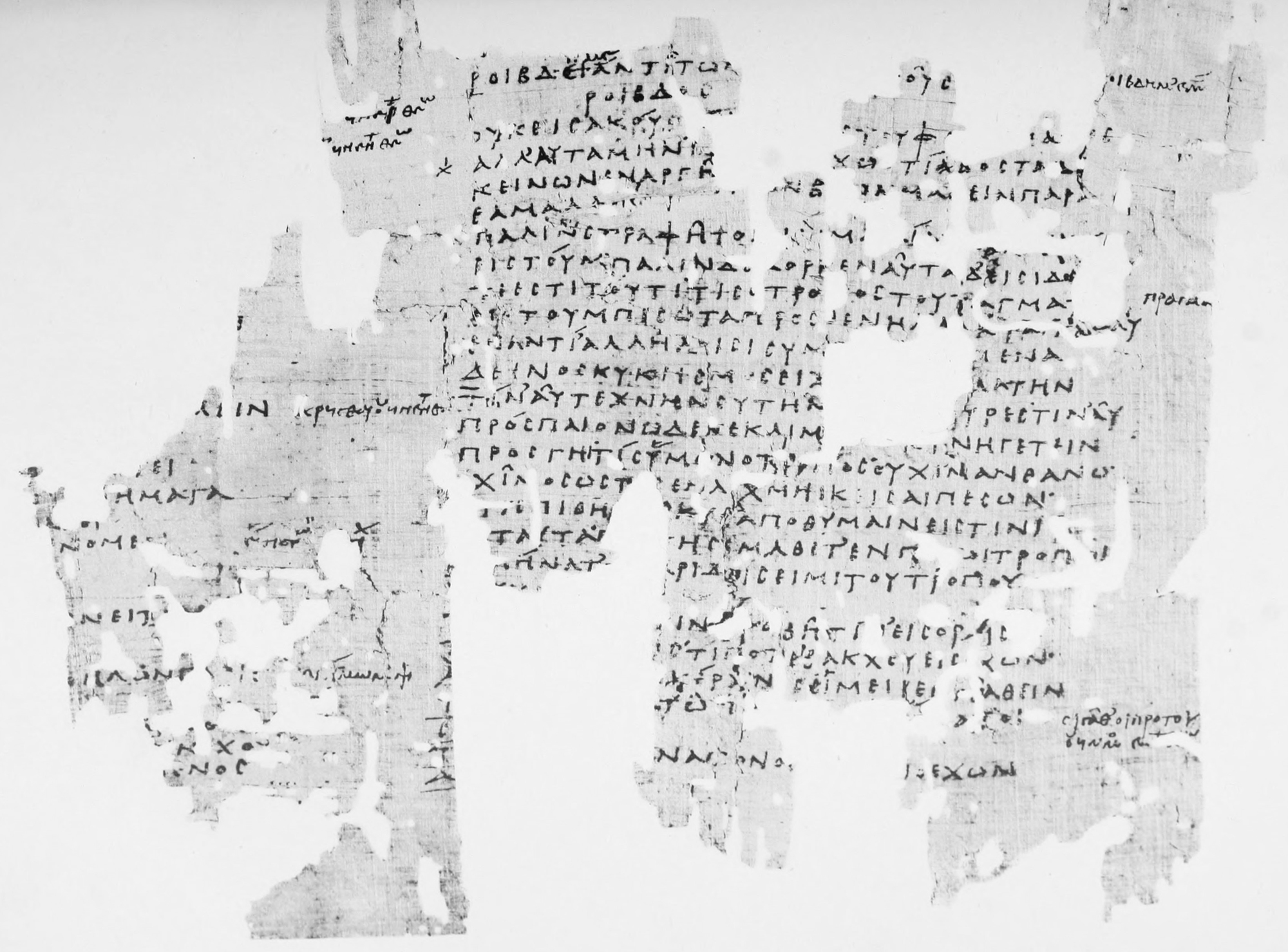
Lines 96–138 of the Ichneutae on a fragment of Papyrus Oxyrhynchus IX 1174 col. iv–v, which provides the majority of the surviving portion of the play

The classical author who has most benefited from the finds at Oxyrhynchus is the Athenian playwright Menander (342–291 BC), whose comedies were very popular in Hellenistic times and whose works are frequently found in papyrus fragments. Menander's plays found in fragments at Oxyrhynchus include Misoumenos, Dis Exapaton, Epitrepontes, Karchedonios, Dyskolos and Kolax. The works found at Oxyrhynchus have greatly raised Menander's status among classicists and scholars of Greek theatre.

Another notable text uncovered at Oxyrhynchus was Ichneutae, a previously unknown play written by Sophocles. The discovery of Ichneutae was especially significant since Ichneutae is a satyr play, making it only one of two extant satyr plays, with the other one being Euripides's Cyclops.

Extensive remains of the Hypsipyle of Euripides and a life of Euripides by Satyrus the Peripatetic were also found at Oxyrhynchus.

==== Poetry ====
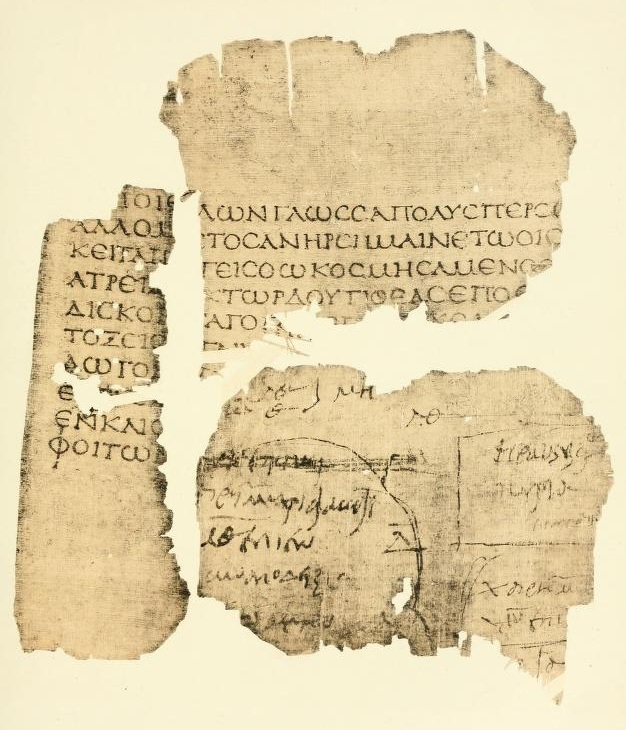
P. Oxy. 20, verso

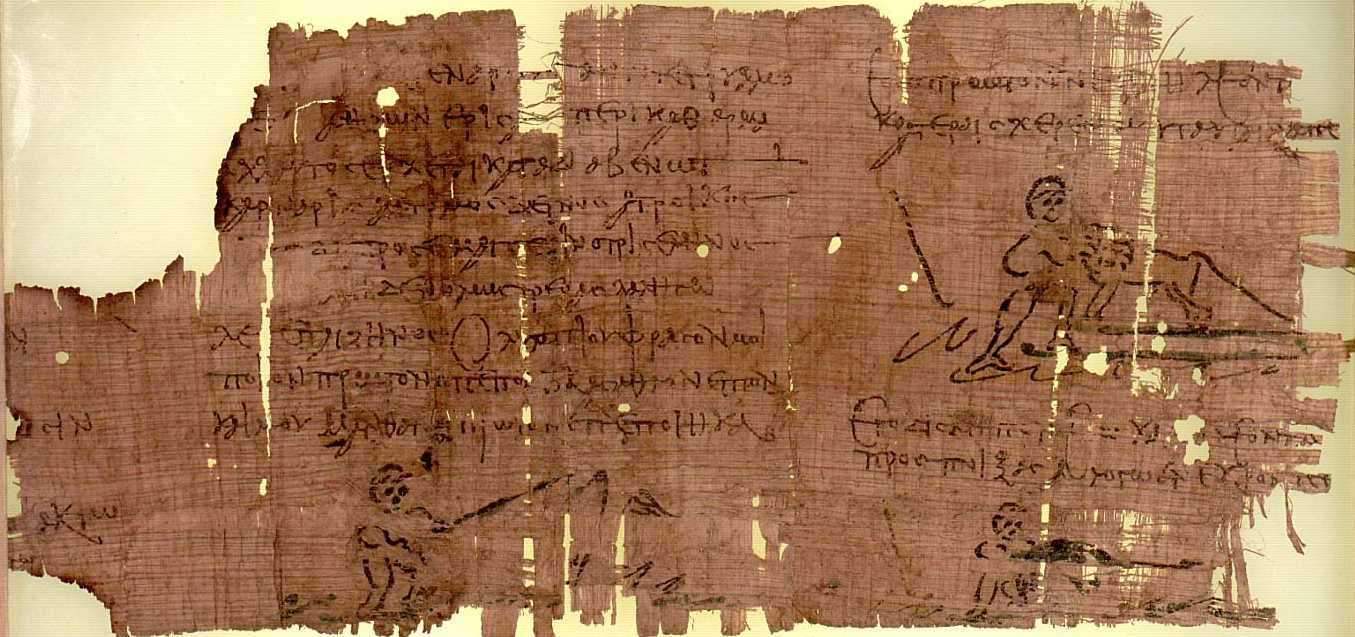
The Heracles Papyrus. (P. Oxy. 2331)

- Poems of Pindar. Pindar was the first known Greek poet to reflect on the nature of poetry and on the poet's role.
- Fragments of Sappho, Greek poet from the island of Lesbos famous for her poems about love.
- Fragments of Alcaeus, an older contemporary and an alleged lover of Sappho, with whom he may have exchanged poems.
- Larger pieces of Alcman, Ibycus, and Corinna.
- Passages from Homer's Iliad. See Papyrus Oxyrhynchus 20 – Iliad II.730-828 and Papyrus Oxyrhynchus 21 – Iliad II.745-764
- Passages and coloured line drawings of the killing of the Nemean Lion from Labours of Heracles (Pap. Oxyrhynchus 2331)

=== Latin ===
An epitome of seven of the 107 lost books of Livy was the most important literary find in Latin.

== Christian texts ==
Among the Christian texts found at Oxyrhynchus, were fragments of early non-canonical Gospels, Oxyrhynchus 840 (3rd century AD) and Oxyrhynchus 1224 (4th century AD). Other Oxyrhynchus texts preserve parts of Matthew 1 (3rd century: P2 and P401), 11–12 and 19 (3rd to 4th century: P2384, 2385); Mark 10–11 (5th to 6th century: P3); John 1 and 20 (3rd century: P208); Romans 1 (4th century: P209); the First Epistle of John (4th-5th century: P402); the Apocalypse of Baruch (chapters 12–14; 4th or 5th century: P403); the Gospel of Thomas (3rd century AD: P655); The Shepherd of Hermas (3rd or 4th century: P404), and a work of Irenaeus, (3rd century: P405). There are many parts of other canonical books as well as many early Christian hymns, prayers, and letters also found among them.

All manuscripts classified as "theological" in the Oxyrhynchus Papyri are listed below. A few manuscripts that belong to multiple genres, or genres that are inconsistently treated in the volumes of the Oxyrhynchus Papyri, are also included. For example, the quotation from Psalm 90 (P. Oxy. XVI 1928) associated with an amulet, is classified according to its primary genre as a magic text in the Oxyrhynchus Papyri; however, it is included here among witnesses to the Old Testament text. In each volume that contains theological manuscripts, they are listed first, according to an English tradition of academic precedence (see also Doctor of Divinity).

=== Old Testament ===
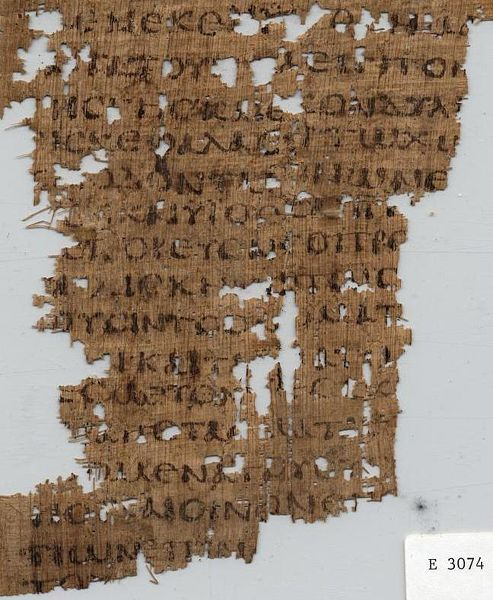
P. Oxy. VI 846: Amos 2 (LXX)

The original Hebrew Bible (Tanakh) was translated into Greek between the 3rd and 1st centuries BC. This translation is called the Septuagint (or LXX, both 70 in Latin), because there is a tradition that seventy Jewish scribes compiled it in Alexandria. It was quoted in the New Testament and is found bound together with the New Testament in the 4th and 5th century Greek uncial codices Sinaiticus, Alexandrinus and Vaticanus. The Septuagint included books, called the Apocrypha or Deuterocanonical by some Christians, which were later not accepted into the Jewish canon of sacred writings (see next section). Portions of Old Testament books of undisputed authority found among the Oxyrhynchus Papyri are listed in this section.

- The first number (Vol) is the volume of the Oxyrhynchus Papyri in which the manuscript is published.
- The second number (Oxy) is the overall publication sequence number in Oxyrhynchus Papyri.
- Standard abbreviated citation of the Oxyrhynchus Papyri is:

P. Oxy. <volume in Roman numerals> <publication sequence number>.

- Context will always make clear whether volume 70 of the Oxyrhynchus Papyri or the Septuagint is intended.
- P. Oxy. VIII 1073 is an Old Latin version of Genesis, other manuscripts are probably copies of the Septuagint.
- Dates are estimated to the nearest 50 year increment.
- Content is given to the nearest verse where known.

Vol	Oxy	Date	Content	Institution	City, State	Country
IV	656	150	Gen 14:21–23; 15:5–9; 19:32–20:11; 24:28–47; 27:32–33, 40–41	Bodleian Library; MS.Gr.bib.d.5(P)	Oxford	UK
VI	845	400	Psalms 68; 70	Egyptian Museum; JE 41083	Cairo	Egypt
VI	846	550	Amos 2	University of Pennsylvania; E 3074	Philadelphia; Pennsylvania	U.S.
VII	1007	400	Genesis 2–3	British Museum; Inv. 2047	London	UK
VIII	1073	350	Gen 5–6 Old Latin	British Museum; Inv. 2052	London	UK
VIII	1074	250	Exodus 31–32	University of Illinois; GP 1074	Urbana, Illinois	U.S.
VIII	1075	250	Exodus 11:26–32	British Library; Inv. 2053 (recto)	London	UK
IX	1166	250	Genesis 16:8–12	British Library; Inv. 2066	London	UK
IX	1167	350	Genesis 31	Princeton Theological Seminary; Pap. 9	Princeton; New Jersey	U.S.
IX	1168	350	Joshua 4-5 vellum	Princeton Theological Seminary; Pap. 10	Princeton; New Jersey	U.S.
X	1225	350	Leviticus 16	Princeton Theological Seminary; Pap. 12	Princeton; New Jersey	U.S.
X	1226	300	Psalms 7–8	Liverpool University; Class. Gr. Libr. 4241227	Liverpool	UK
XI	1351	350	Lev 27 vellum	Ambrose Swasey Library; 886.4 Colgate Rochester Crozer Divinity School (prior to private sale)	Rochester; New York	U.S.
XI	1352	325	Pss 82–83 vellum	Egyptian Museum; JE 47472	Cairo	Egypt
XV	1779	350	Psalm 1	United Theological Seminary	Dayton, Ohio	U.S.
XVI	1928	500	Ps 90 amulet	Ashmolean Museum	Oxford	UK
XVII	2065	500	Psalm 90	Ashmolean Museum	Oxford	UK
XVII	2066	500	Ecclesiastes 6–7	Ashmolean Museum	Oxford	UK
XXIV	2386	500	Psalms 83–84	Ashmolean Museum	Oxford	UK
L	3522	50	Job 42.11–12	Ashmolean Museum	Oxford	UK
LX	4011	550	Ps 75 interlinear	Ashmolean Museum	Oxford	UK
LXV	4442	225	Ex 20:10–17, 18–22	Ashmolean Museum	Oxford	UK
LXV	4443	100	Esther 8:16-9:3	Ashmolean Museum	Oxford	UK

==== Old Testament Deuterocanon (or, Apocrypha) ====
This name designates several, unique writings (e.g., the Book of Tobit) or different versions of pre-existing writings (e.g., the Book of Daniel) found in the canon of the Jewish scriptures (most notably, in the Septuagint translation of the Hebrew Tanakh). Although those writings were no longer viewed as having a canonical status amongst Jews by the beginning of the second century A.D., they retained that status for much of the Christian Church. They were and are accepted as part of the Old Testament canon by the Catholic Church and Eastern Orthodox churches. Protestant Christians, however, follow the example of the Jews and do not accept these writings as part of the Old Testament canon.

- PP. Oxy. XIII 1594 and LXV 4444 are vellum ("vellum" noted in table).
- Both copies of Tobit are different editions to the known Septuagint text ("not LXX" noted in table).

Vol	Oxy	Date	Content	Institution	City, State	Country
III	403	400	2 Baruch 12:1–13:2, 13:11–14:3	Property of The General Theological Seminary and held at the Bishop Payne Library of Virginia Theological Seminary	Alexandria, VA	U.S.
VII	1010	350	2 Esdras 16:57–59	Bodleian Library; MS.Gr.bib.g.3(P)	Oxford	UK
VIII	1076	550	Tobit 2 not LXX	John Rylands University Library; 448	Manchester	UK
XIII	1594	275	Tobit 12 vellum, not LXX	Cambridge University Library; Add.MS. 6363	Cambridge	UK
XIII	1595	550	Ecclesiasticus 1	Palestine Institute Museum; Pacific School of Religion	Berkeley; California	U.S.
XVII	2069	400	1 Enoch 85.10–86.2, 87.1–3	Ashmolean Museum	Oxford	UK
XVII	2074	450	Apostrophe to Wisdom [?]	Ashmolean Museum	Oxford	UK
LXV	4444	350	Wisdom 4:17–5:1 vellum	Ashmolean Museum	Oxford	UK

==== Other related papyri ====
Vol	Oxy	Date	Content	Institution	City, State	Country
IX	1173	250	Philo	Bodleian Library	Oxford	UK
XI	1356	250	Philo	Bodleian Library	Oxford	UK
XVIII	2158	250	Philo	Ashmolean Museum	Oxford	UK
XXXVI	2745	400	onomasticon of Hebrew names	Ashmolean Museum	Oxford	UK

=== New Testament ===
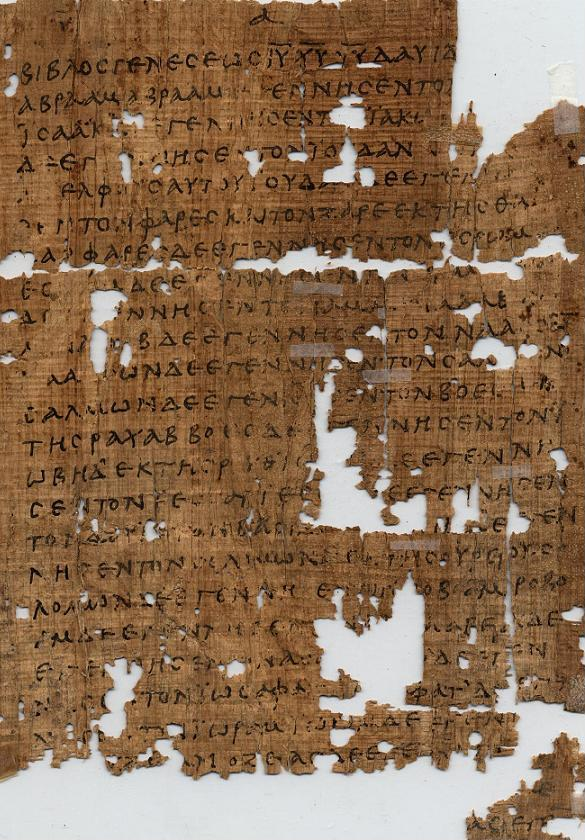
Papyrus 𝔓^{1}: Matthew 1

The Oxyrhynchus Papyri have provided the most numerous sub-group of the earliest copies of the New Testament. These are surviving portions of codices (books) written in Greek uncial (capital) letters on papyrus. The first of these were excavated by Bernard Pyne Grenfell and Arthur Surridge Hunt in Oxyrhynchus, at the turn of the 20th century. Of the 127 registered New Testament papyri, 52 (41%) are from Oxyrhynchus. The earliest of the papyri are dated to the middle of the 2nd century, so were copied within about a century of the writing of the original New Testament documents.

Grenfell and Hunt discovered the first New Testament papyrus (𝔓^{1}), on only the second day of excavation, in the winter of 1896–7. This, together with the other early discoveries, was published in 1898, in the first volume of the now 86-volume work, The Oxyrhynchus Papyri.

- The third column (CRG) refers to the now standard sequences of Caspar René Gregory.
- 𝔓 indicates a papyrus manuscript, a number beginning with zero indicates vellum.
- The CRG number is an adequate abbreviated citation for New Testament manuscripts.
- Content is given to the nearest chapter; verses are sometimes listed.

Vol	Oxy	CRG	Date	Content	Institution	City, State	Country
I	2	𝔓^{1}	250	Matthew 1	University of Pennsylvania	Philadelphia; Pennsylvania	U.S.
I	3	069	500	Mark 10:50.51; 11:11.12	Frederick Haskell Oriental Institute; University of Chicago; 2057	Chicago; Illinois	U.S.
II	208=1781	𝔓^{5}	250	John 1, 16, 20	British Library	London	UK
II	209	𝔓^{10}	350	Romans 1	Houghton Library, Harvard	Cambridge; Massachusetts	U.S.
III	401	071	500	Matthew 10-11 †	Harvard Semitic Museum; 3735	Cambridge; Massachusetts	U.S.
III	402	𝔓^{9}	250	1 John 4	Houghton Library, Harvard	Cambridge; Massachusetts	U.S.
IV	657	𝔓^{13}	250	Hebrews 2–5, 10–12	British Library	London	UK
VI	847	0162	300	John 2	Metropolitan Museum of Art	New York	U.S.
VI	848	0163	450	Revelation 16	Metropolitan Museum of Art	New York	U.S.
VII	1008	𝔓^{15}	250	1 Corinthians 7–8	Egyptian Museum	Cairo	Egypt
VII	1009	𝔓^{16}	300	Philippians 3–4	Egyptian Museum	Cairo	Egypt
VIII	1078	𝔓^{17}	350	Hebrews 9	Cambridge University Library, Cambridge	Cambridge	UK
VIII	1079	𝔓^{18}	300	Revelation 1	British Library	London	UK
VIII	1080	0169	350	Revelation 3–4	Robert Elliott Speer Library; Princeton Theological Seminary	Princeton	U.S.
IX	1169	0170	500	Matthew 6	Robert Elliott Speer Library; Princeton Theological Seminary	Princeton	U.S.
IX	1170	𝔓^{19}	400	Matthew 10–11	Bodleian Library	Oxford	UK
IX	1171	𝔓^{20}	250	James 2–3	Harvey S. Firestone Memorial Library, Princeton	Princeton; New Jersey	U.S.
X	1227	𝔓^{21}	400	Matthew 12	Muhlenberg College	Allentown; Pennsylvania	U.S.
X	1228	𝔓^{22}	250	John 15–16	Glasgow University Library	Glasgow	UK
X	1229	𝔓^{23}	250	James 1	University of Illinois	Urbana, Illinois	U.S.
X	1230	𝔓^{24}	350	Revelation 5–6	Franklin Trask Library; Andover Newton Theological School	Newton; Massachusetts	U.S.
XI	1353	0206	350	1 Peter 5	United Theological Seminary	Dayton, Ohio	U.S.
XI	1354	𝔓^{26}	600	Romans 1	Joseph S. Bridwell Library; Southern Methodist University	Dallas, Texas	U.S.
XI	1355	𝔓^{27}	250	Romans 8–9	Cambridge University Library	Cambridge	UK
XIII	1596	𝔓^{28}	250	John 6	Palestine Institute Museum; Pacific School of Religion	Berkeley; California	U.S.
XIII	1597	𝔓^{29}	250	Acts 26	Bodleian Library	Oxford	UK
XIII	1598	𝔓^{30}	250	1 Ths 4–5; 2 Ths 1	Ghent University Library	Ghent	Belgium
XV	1780	𝔓^{39}	250	John 8	Museum of the Bible	Washington, D.C.	U.S.
XV	1781=208	𝔓^{5}	250	John 1, 16, 20	British Library	London	UK
XVIII	2157	𝔓^{51}	400	Galatians 1	Ashmolean Museum	Oxford	UK
XXIV	2383	𝔓^{69}	250	Luke 22	Ashmolean Museum	Oxford	UK
XXIV	2384	𝔓^{70}	250	Matthew 2–3, 11–12, 24	Ashmolean Museum	Oxford	UK
XXIV	2385	𝔓^{71}	350	Matthew 19	Ashmolean Museum	Oxford	UK
XXXIV/LXIV	2683/4405	𝔓^{77}	200	Matthew 23	Ashmolean Museum	Oxford	UK
XXXIV	2684	𝔓^{78}	300	Jude	Ashmolean Museum	Oxford	UK
L	3523	𝔓^{90}	150	John 18–19	Ashmolean Museum	Oxford	UK
LXV	4449	𝔓^{100}	300	James 3–5	Sackler Library; Papyrology Rooms	Oxford	UK
LXIV	4401	𝔓^{101}	250	Matthew 3–4	Ashmolean Museum	Oxford	UK
LXIV	4402	𝔓^{102}	300	Matthew 4	Ashmolean Museum	Oxford	UK
LXIV	4403	𝔓^{103}	200	Matthew 13–14	Ashmolean Museum	Oxford	UK
LXIV	4404	𝔓^{104}	150	Matthew 21	Ashmolean Museum	Oxford	UK
LXIV	4406	𝔓^{105}	500	Matthew 27–28	Ashmolean Museum	Oxford	UK
LXV	4445	𝔓^{106}	250	John 1	Ashmolean Museum	Oxford	UK
LXV	4446	𝔓^{107}	250	John 17	Ashmolean Museum	Oxford	UK
LXV	4447	𝔓^{108}	250	John 17/18	Ashmolean Museum	Oxford	UK
LXV	4448	𝔓^{109}	250	John 21	Ashmolean Museum	Oxford	UK
LXVI	4494	𝔓^{110}	350	Matthew 10	Sackler Library; Papyrology Rooms	Oxford	UK
LXVI	4495	𝔓^{111}	250	Luke 17	Ashmolean Museum	Oxford	UK
LXVI	4496	𝔓^{112}	450	Acts 26–27	Ashmolean Museum	Oxford	UK
LXVI	4497	𝔓^{113}	250	Romans 2	Ashmolean Museum	Oxford	UK
LXVI	4498	𝔓^{114}	250	Hebrews 1	Ashmolean Museum	Oxford	UK
LXVI	4499	𝔓^{115}	300	Revelation 2–3, 5–6, 8–15	Ashmolean Museum	Oxford	UK
LXVI	4500	0308	350	Revelation 11:15–18	Ashmolean Museum	Oxford	UK
LXXI	4803	𝔓^{119}	250	John 1:21–28, 38–44	Ashmolean Museum	Oxford	UK
LXXI	4804	𝔓^{120}	350	John 1:25–28, 33–38, 42–44	Ashmolean Museum	Oxford	UK
LXXI	4805	𝔓^{121}	250	John 19:17–18, 25–26	Ashmolean Museum	Oxford	UK
LXXI	4806	𝔓^{122}	4th/5th century	John 21:11–14, 22–24	Ashmolean Museum	Oxford	UK
LXXII	4844	𝔓^{123}	4th/5th century	1 Corinthians 14:31–34; 15:3–6	Ashmolean Museum	Oxford	UK
LXXII	4845	𝔓^{124}	4th/5th century	2 Corinthians 11:1-4. 6–9	Ashmolean Museum	Oxford	UK
LXXIII	4934	𝔓^{125}	3rd/4th century	1 Peter 1:23-2:5.7-12	Ashmolean Museum	Oxford	UK
LXXIV	4968	𝔓^{127}	5th century	Acts 10–17	Ashmolean Museum	Oxford	UK
LXXXI	5258	𝔓^{132}	3rd/4th century	Ephesians 3:21–4:2, 14–16	Unknown	Unknown	Unknown
LXXXI	5259	𝔓^{133}	3rd century	1 Timothy 3:13–4:8	Ashmolean Museum	Oxford	UK
LXXXVII	5575		late 2nd century	Syncretistic: portions of Matt 6, Luke 12, Thomas 27			

==== New Testament apocrypha ====
The Oxyrhynchus Papyri collection contains around twenty manuscripts of New Testament apocrypha, works from the early Christian period that presented themselves as biblical books, but were not eventually received as such by the orthodoxy. These works found at Oxyrhynchus include the gospels of Thomas, Mary, Peter, James, The Shepherd of Hermas, and the Didache. (All of these are known from other sources as well.) Among this collection are also a few manuscripts of unknown gospels. The three manuscripts of Thomas represent the only known Greek manuscripts of this work; the only other surviving manuscript of Thomas is a nearly complete Coptic manuscript from the Nag Hammadi find. P. Oxy. 4706, a manuscript of The Shepherd of Hermas, is notable because two sections believed by scholars to have been often circulated independently, Visions and Commandments, were found on the same roll.

- P. Oxy. V 840 and P. Oxy. XV 1782 are vellum
- 2949?, 3525, 3529? 4705, and 4706 are rolls, the rest codices.

Vol	Oxy	Date	Content	Institution	City, State	Country
**Early Writings**
LXIX	4705	250	Shepherd, Visions 1:1, 8–9	Ashmolean Museum	Oxford	UK
LXIX	4706	200	Shepherd; Visions 3–4; Commandments 2; 4–9	Ashmolean Museum	Oxford	UK
L	3526	350	Shepherd, Commandments 5–6 [same codex as 1172]	Ashmolean Museum	Oxford	UK
XV	1783	325	Shepherd, Commandments 9			
IX	1172	350	Shepherd, Parables 2:4–10 [same codex as 3526]	British Library; Inv. 224	London	UK
LXIX	4707	250	Shepherd, Parables 6:3–7:2	Ashmolean Museum	Oxford	UK
XIII	1599	350	Shepherd, Parables 8			
L	3527	200	Shepherd, Parables 8:4–5	Ashmolean Museum	Oxford	UK
L	3528	200	Shepherd, Parables 9:20–22	Ashmolean Museum	Oxford	UK
III	404	300	Shepherd			
XV	1782	350	Didache 1–3	Ashmolean Museum	Oxford	UK
**Pseudepigrapha**
I	1	200	Gospel of Thomas	Bodleian Library; Ms. Gr. Th. e 7 (P)	Oxford	UK
IV	654	200	Gospel of Thomas	British Library; Inv. 1531	London	UK
IV	655	200	Gospel of Thomas	Houghton Library, Harvard; SM Inv. 4367	Cambridge; Massachusetts	US
XLI	2949	200	Gospel of Peter?	Ashmolean Museum	Oxford	UK
L	3524	550	Gospel of James 25:1	Ashmolean Museum	Oxford	UK
L	**3525**	250	Gospel of Mary	Ashmolean Museum	Oxford	UK
LX	4009	150	Gospel of Peter?	Ashmolean Museum	Oxford	UK
I	6	450	Acts of Paul and Thecla			
VI	849	325	Acts of Peter			
VI	850	350	Acts of John			
VI	851	500	Apocryphal Acts			
VIII	1081		Gnostic Gospel			
II	**210**	250	Unknown gospel	Cambridge University Library; Add. Ms. 4048	Cambridge	UK
V	**840**	200	Unknown gospel	Bodleian Library; Ms. Gr. Th. g 11	Oxford	UK
X	**1224**	300	Unknown gospel	Bodleian Library; Ms. Gr. Th. e 8 (P)	Oxford	UK

==== Other related texts ====
- Four exact dates are marked in bold type:

three libelli are dated: all to the year 250, two to the month, and one to the day;
a warrant to arrest a Christian is dated to 28 February 256.

Vol	Oxy	Date	Content	Institution	City, State	Country
**Biblical quotes**
VIII	1077	550	Amulet: magic text quotes Matthew 4:23–24	Trexler Library; Pap. Theol. 2 Muhlenberg College	Allentown; Pennsylvania	U.S.
LX	4010	350	"Our Father" (Matthew 6:9ff) with introductory prayer	Papyrology Room; Ashmolean Museum	Oxford	UK
**Creeds**
XVII	2067	450	Nicene Creed (325)	Papyrology Room; Ashmolean Museum	Oxford	UK
XV	1784	450	Constantinopolitan Creed (4th-century)	Ambrose Swasey Library; Colgate Rochester Crozer Divinity School	Rochester; New York	U.S.
**Church Fathers**
III	**405**	250	Irenaeus, Against Heresies	Cambridge University Library; Add. Ms. 4413	Cambridge	UK
XXXI	2531	550	Theophilus I of Alexandria; Peri Katanuxeos [?]	Papyrology Rooms; Sackler Library	Oxford	UK
**Unknown theological works**
XIII	1600	450	treatise on The Passion	Bodleian Library; Ms. Gr. Th. d 4 (P)	Oxford	UK
I	4	300	theological fragment	Cambridge University Library	Cambridge	UK
III	406	250	theological fragment	Library; BH 88470.1; McCormick Theological Seminary	Chicago; Illinois	U.S.
**Dialogues** (theological discussions)
XVII	2070	275	anti-Jewish dialogue	Papyrology Rooms; Sackler Library	Oxford	UK
XVII	2071	550	fragment of a dialogue	Papyrology Rooms; Sackler Library	Oxford	UK
**Apologies** (arguments in defence of Christianity)
XVII	2072	250	fragment of an apology	Papyrology Rooms; Sackler Library	Oxford	UK
**Homilies** (short sermons)
XIII	1601	400	homily about spiritual warfare	Ambrose Swasey Library; Colgate Rochester Crozer Divinity School	Rochester; New York	U.S.
XIII	1602	400	homily to monks (vellum)	University Library; State University of Ghent	Ghent	Belgium
XIII	1603	500	homily about women	John Rylands University Library; Inv R. 55247	Manchester	UK
XV	1785	450	collection of homilies [?]	Papyrology Room; Ashmolean Museum	Oxford	UK
XVII	2073	375	fragment of a homily and other text	Papyrology Rooms; Sackler Library	Oxford	UK
**Liturgical texts** (protocols for Christian meetings)
XVII	2068	350	liturgical [?] fragments	Papyrology Rooms; Sackler Library	Oxford	UK
III	407	300	Christian prayer	Department of Manuscripts; British Library	London	UK
XV	**1786**	275	Christian hymn with musical notation	Papyrology Rooms; Sackler Library	Oxford	UK
**Hagiographies** (biographies of saints)
L	3529	350	martyrdom of Dioscorus	Papyrology Room; Ashmolean Museum	Oxford	UK
**Libelli** (certificates of pagan sacrifice)
LVIII	**3929**	**250**	libellus from between 25 June and 24 July 250	Papyrology Room; Ashmolean Museum	Oxford	UK
IV	**658**	**250**	libellus from the year 250	Beinecke Library; Yale University	New Haven; Connecticut	U.S.
XII	**1464**	**250**	libellus 27 June 250	Department of Manuscripts; British Library	London	UK
XLI	**2990**	250	libellus from the 3rd century	Papyrology Rooms; Sackler Library	Oxford	UK
**Other documentary texts**
XLII	**3035**	**256**	warrant to arrest a Christian; 28 February 256	Papyrology Room; Ashmolean Museum	Oxford	UK
**Other fragments**
I	5	300	early Christian fragment	Bodleian Library; Ms. Gr. Th. f 9 (P)	Oxford	UK

== Bibliography ==
The Oxyrhynchus papyri series has been published since 1898.

- Grenfell, B. P.; Hunt, A. S. (1898). The Oxyrhynchus papyri. Vol. 1. London: Egypt Exploration Fund.
- v. 1. Texts (I-CCVII) – Indexes. 1898
- v. 2. Texts (CCVIII-CCCC) – Indexes. 1899
- v. 3. Texts (401-653) – Indexes. 1903
- v. 4. Texts (654-839) – Indexes. 1904
- v. 5. Texts (840-844) – Indexes. 1908
- v. 6. Texts (845-1006) – Indexes. 1908
- v. 7. Texts (1007-1072) – Indexes. 1910
- v. 8. Texts (1073-1165) – Indexes / edited with translations and notes by Arthur S. Hunt. 1911
- v. 9. Texts (1166-1223) – Indexes / edited with translations and notes by Arthur S. Hunt. 1912
- v. 10. Texts (1224-1350) – Indexes. 1914
- v. 11. Texts (1351-1404) – Indexes. 1915
- Grenfell, B. P.; Hunt, A. S. (1916). The Oxyrhynchus papyri. Vol. 12. London: Egypt Exploration Fund.
- v. 13. Texts (1594-1625) – Indexes. 1919
- v. 14. Texts (1626-1777) – Indexes. 1920
- v. 15. Texts (1778-1828) – Indexes. 1922
- v. 16. Texts (1829-2063) – Indexes. 1924
- v. 17. Texts (2065-2156) – Indexes / edited with translations and notes by Arthur S. Hunt. 1927
- v. 18. Texts (2157-2207) – Indexes / edited with translations and notes by E. Lobel. 1941
- v. 19. Texts (2208-2244) – Indexes / edited with translations and notes by E. Lobel [and others]. 1948
- v. 20. Texts (2245-2287) – Indexes / edited with translations and notes by E. Lobel [and others]. 1952
- v. 21. Texts (2288-2308) – Indexes / edited with notes by E. Lobel. 1951
- v. 22. Texts (2309-2353) – Indexes / edited with translations and notes by E. Lobel and C.H. Roberts. 1954
- v. 23. Texts (2354-2382) – Indexes / edited with notes by E. Lobel. 1956
- v. 24. Texts (2383-2425) – Indexes / edited with translations and notes by E. Lobel [and others]. 1957 (repr. 1964)
- v. 25. Texts (2426-2437) – Indexes / edited with translations and notes by E. Lobel and E.G. Turner. 1959
- v. 26. Texts (2438-2451) – Indexes / edited with notes by E. Lobel. 1961
- v. 27. Texts (2452-2480) – Indexes / edited with translations and notes by E.G. Turner [and others]. 1962
- v. 28. Texts (2481-2505) – Indexes / edited with notes by E. Lobel. 1962
- v. 29. Text (2506) – Indexes / edited with a commentary by Denys Page. 1963
- v. 30. Texts (2507-2530) – Indexes / edited with notes by E. Lobel. 1964
- v. 31. Texts (2531-2616) – Indexes / edited with translations and notes by J.W.B. Barns [and others]. 1966
- v. 32. Texts (2617-2653) – Indexes / edited with notes by E. Lobel. 1967
- v. 33. Texts (2654-2682) – Indexes / edited with translations and notes by Peter Parsons [and others]. 1968
- v. 34. Texts (2683-2732) – Indexes / edited with translations and notes by L. Ingrams [and others]. 1968
- v. 35. Texts (2733-2744) – Indexes / edited with notes by E. Lobel. 1968
- v. 36. Texts (2745-2800) – Indexes / edited with translations and notes by R.A. Coles [and others]. 1970
- v. 37. Texts (2801-2823) – Indexes / edited with notes by E. Lobel. 1971
- v. 38. Texts (2824-2877) – Indexes / edited with translations and notes by Gerald M. Browne. 1971
- v. 39. Texts (2878-2891) – Indexes / edited with notes by E. Lobel. 1972
- v. 40. Texts (2892-2942) – Indexes / edited with translations and notes by J.R. Rea. 1972
- v. 41. Texts (2943-2998) – Indexes / edited with translations and notes by G.M. Browne. 1972
- v. 42. Texts (2999-3087) – Indexes / edited with translations and notes by p.J. Parsons. 1974
- v. 43. Texts (3088-3150) – Indexes / edited with translations and notes by J.R. Rea. 1975
- v. 44. Texts (3151-3208) – Indexes / edited with translations and notes by A.K. Bowman [and others]. 1976
- v. 45. Texts (3209-3266) – Indexes / edited with translations and notes by A.K. Bowman [and others]. 1977
- v. 46. Texts (3267-3315) – Indexes / edited with translations and notes by J.R. Rea. 1978
- v. 47. Texts (3316-3367) – Indexes / edited with translations and notes by R.A. Coles, M.W. Haslam. 1980
- v. 48. Texts (3368-3430) – Indexes / edited with translations and notes by M. Chambers [and others]. 1981
- v. 49. Texts (3431-3521) – Indexes / edited with translations and notes by A. Bülow-Jacobsen, J.E.G. Whitehorne. 1982
- v. 50. Texts (3522-3600) – Indexes / edited with translations and notes by A.K. Bowman [and others]. 1983
- v. 51. Texts (3601-3646) – Indexes / edited with translations and notes by J.R. Rea. 1984
- v. 52. Texts (3647-3694) – Indexes / edited with translations and notes by Helen M. Cockle. 1984
- v. 53. Texts (3695-3721) – Indexes / edited with translations and notes by M.W. Haslam. 1986
- v. 54. Texts (3722-3776) – Indexes / edited with translations and notes by R.A. Coles, H. Maehler, p.J. Parsons. 1987
- v. 55. Texts (3777-3821) – Indexes / edited with translations and notes by J.R. Rea. 1988
- v. 56. Texts (3822-3875) – Indexes / edited with translations and notes by M.G. Sirivianou. 1989
- v. 57. Texts (3876-3914) – Indexes / edited with translations and notes by M.W. Haslam, H. el-Maghrabi, J.D. Thomas. 1990
- v. 58. Documents of the Roman and Byzantine periods (3915-3962) – Indexes / edited with translations and notes by J.R. Rea. 1991
- v. 59. Texts (3963-4008) – Indexes / edited with translations and notes by E.W. Handley [and others]. 1992
- v. 60. Texts (4009-4092) – Indexes / edited with translations and notes by R.A. Coles, M.W. Haslam, p.J. Parsons. 1994
- v. 61. Texts (4093-4300) – Indexes / edited with translations and notes by T. Gagos. 1995
- v. 62. Texts (4301-4351) – Indexes / edited with translations and notes by J.C Shelton, J.E.G. Whitehorne. 1995
- v. 63. Documents of the Byzantine period (4352-4400) – Indexes / edited with translations and notes by J.R. Rea. 1996
- v. 64. New Testament (4401-4406) – Comedy (4407-4412) – Hellenistic poets (4413-4432) – Documents of the Roman and Byzantine periods (4433-4441) – Indexes. 1998
- v. 65. Theological texts (4442-4449) – Literary texts (4450-4460) – Texts with musical notation (4461-4467) – Magic, religion and astrology (4468-4477) – Documentary texts (4478-4493) – Indexes. 1998
- v. 66. New Testament (4494-4500) – Epigram and elegy (4501-4507) – Comedy (4508-4523) – Documentary texts (4524-4544) – Indexes. 1999
- v. 67. Euripides (4545-4568) – Demosthenes (4569-4580) – Oracular texts (4581) – Documentary texts (4582-4623) – Private letters (4624-4629) – Scholia Minora to Homer, Iliad II (4630-4638) – Indexes. 2001
- v. 68. New literary texts (4639-4652) – Known literary texts (4653-4668) – Subliterary texts (4669-4674) – Documentary texts (4675-4704) – Indexes. 2003
- v. 69. Theological texts (4705-4707) – New literary texts (4708-4714) – Known literary texts (4715-4738) – Documentary texts (4739-4757) – Appendix – Indexes. 2005
- v. 70. Theological text (4759) – New literary texts (4760-4762) – Known literary texts (4763-4771) – Documentary texts (4772-4802) – Appendix – Indexes. 2006
- v. 71. Theological texts (4803-4806) – New literary texts (4807-4812) – Homer and Homerica (4813-4821) – Documentary texts (4822-4837) – Drawings (4838-4843) – Indexes. 2007
- v. 72. New Testament (4844-4845) – Hexameter poetry (4846-4853) – Rhetorical texts (4854-4855) – Documents of the Roman period (4856-4892) – Documents of the Byzantine period (4893-4930) – Indexes. 2008
- v. 73. Theological texts (4931-4934) – Comedy (4935-4937) – New literary texts (4938-4945) – Known literary texts (4946-4949) – Subliterary texts (4950-4952) – Documentary texts (4953-4967) – Indexes. 2009
- v. 74. New Testament (4968) – Medical and related texts (4969-4979) – Documentary texts (4980-5019) – Indexes. 2009
- v. 75. Theological texts (5020-5024) – New literary texts (5025-5026) – Known literary texts (5027-5048) – Documentary texts (5049-5071)
- v. 76. Theological texts (5072-5074) – New literary texts (5075-5077) – Known literary texts (5078-5092) – Documentary texts (5096-5100) – Indexes. Edited with translations and notes by D. Colomo and J. Chapa. 2011
- v. 77. Septuagint (5101) – Hexameters (5102-5106) – Documentary texts (5107-5126) – Indexes. Edited with translations and notes by A. Benaissa. 2011
- v. 78. Theological texts (5127-5129) – New literary texts (5130-5131) – Known literary texts (5132-5158) – Subliterary texts (5159-5163) – Documentary texts (5164-5182). Edited with translations and notes by R.-L. Chang, W.B. Henry, P.J. Parsons, and A. Benaissa. 2012
- v. 79. New literary texts (5183-5194) – Known literary texts (5195-5200) – Subliterary texts (5201-5205) – Documentary texts (5206-5218) / edited with translations and notes by W.B. Henry, P.J. Parsons, and [18 others]. And an appendix: Games, competitors, and performers in Roman Egypt / by S. Remijsen. Indexes. 2014
- v. 80. Extant medical texts (5219-5229) – New medical texts (5230-5253) – Doctors' reports (5254-5257) – Indexes. Edited with translations and notes by M. Hirt, D. Leith and W.B. Henry; with contributions by D. Colomo, N. Gonis, L. Tagliapietra. 2014
- v. 81. Theological texts (5258-5260) – New literary texts (5261-5264) – Known literary texts (5265-5280) – Subliterary texts (5281-5285) – Documentary texts (5286-5289) / edited with translations and notes by J.H. Brusuelas and C. Meccariello. 2016
- v. 82. Theological texts (5290-91) – New classical text (5292) – Extant classical texts (5293-5301) – Glossary (5302) – Magic and medicine (5303-15) – Documentary texts (5316-42) – Drawing (5343) / edited with translations and notes by N. Gonis, F. Maltomini, W.B. Henry and S. Slattery. 2016
- v. 83. Theological texts (5344-5348) – New literary & subliterary texts (5349-5359) – Documentary texts (5360-5400) – Painting & drawings (5401-5403) / edited with translations and notes by P.J. Parsons, N. Gonis. 2018
- v. 84. Septuagint (5404-8) – New literary & subliterary texts (5409-14) – Apollonius Rhodius (5415-31) – Documentary texts (5432-75) – Painting (5476) / edited with translations and notes by A. Benaissa and N. Gonis, W.B. Henry, M. Langelotti. 2019
- v. 85. Theological texts (5477-80) – New literary texts (5481-3) – Known literary texts (5484-94) – Law (5495) – Documentary texts (5496-5531) – Indexes / edited with translations and notes by N. Gonis, P. J. Parsons, and W. B. Henry. 2020
- v. 86. Theological texts (5532-5534) – New literary and subliterary texts (5535-5548) – Documentary texts (5549-5572) / edited with translations and notes by A. Benaissa, M. Zellmann-Rohrer. 2021
- v. 87. Theological texts (5573-5577) - New literary texts (5578-5585) - Extant literary texts (5586-5590) - Documentary texts (5591-5631) / edited with translations and notes by P. J. Parsons and N. Gonis. 2023
- v. 88. Theological Texts (5632–5635) - ‘Hesiod’ (5636–5639) - Hellenistic and Imperial Poetry (5640–5649) - Imperial Prose (5650–5653) - Magic (5654–5655) - Documentary Texts (5656–5681) / edited with translations and notes by A. Benaissa and W.B. Henry. 2025

== See also ==
- Herculaneum papyri
- List of early Christian writers
- List of Egyptian papyri by date
- List of New Testament minuscules
- List of New Testament papyri
- List of New Testament uncials
- Novum Testamentum Graece
- Palaeography
- Papyrology
- Tanakh at Qumran
- Textual criticism
- The Trackers of Oxyrhynchus
- Zooniverse - Ancient Lives
- Serapeum of Alexandria
