= Uncial 0109 =

- New Testament manuscript
- Text: Gospel of John 16-18 †
- Date: 7th-century
- Script: Greek
- Now at: Berlin State Museums
- Size: 17 x 15 cm
- Type: mixed
- Category: III

Uncial 0109 (in the Gregory-Aland numbering), ε 52 (Soden), is a Greek uncial manuscript of the New Testament, dated paleographically to the 7th-century.

== Description ==
The codex contains a small part of the Gospel of John 16:30-17:9; 18:31-40, on two parchment leaves (17 cm by 15 cm). The text is written in one column per page, 22 lines per page, in uncial letters.

The text is divided according to the Ammonian Sections, whose numbers are given at the margins, with their references to the Eusebian Canons.The Greek text of this codex is mixed. Kurt Aland placed it in Category III. C. R. Gregory dated it to the 7th or 8th-century. Currently it is dated by the INTF to the 7th-century. C. R. Gregory saw it in 1903. In 1908 Gregory gave siglum 0111 for it.

The codex is located at the Berlin State Museums (P. 5010) in Berlin.

== See also ==
- List of New Testament uncials
- Textual criticism
