= Decian persecution =

250 AD Christian persecution in the Roman empire

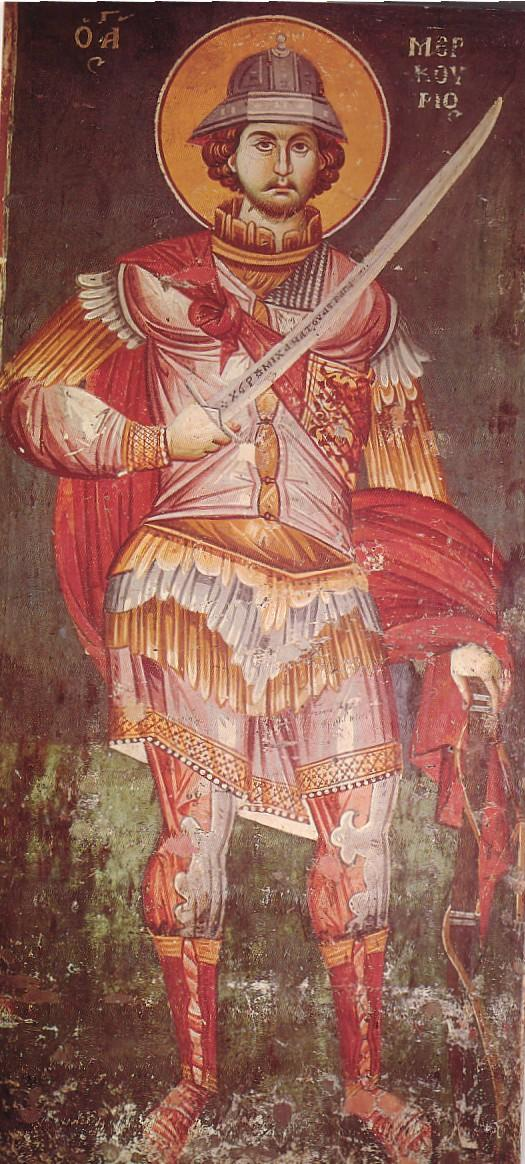
A Byzantine fresco of Saint Mercurius (a Christian victim of the Decian persecution), dated 1295, from Ohrid, North Macedonia

Christians were persecuted in 250 AD under the Roman emperor Decius. He had issued an edict ordering everyone in the empire to perform a sacrifice to the Roman gods and the well-being of the emperor. The sacrifices had to be performed in the presence of a Roman magistrate, and be confirmed by a signed and witnessed certificate from the magistrate. Although the text of the edict has been lost, many examples of the certificates have survived.

Decius' edict was intended to act as an empire-wide loyalty oath to the new emperor (who had come to power in 249 AD), sanctified through the Roman religion. Christian monotheistic beliefs did not allow them to worship any other gods, so they were forced to choose between their religious beliefs and following the decree.

== Background ==
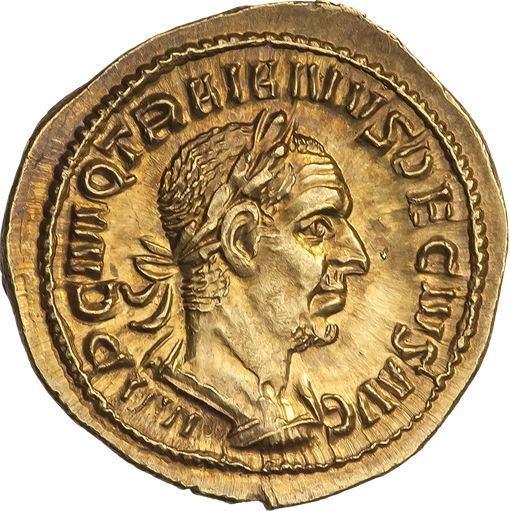
Gold aureus with portrait of Decius

Decius became Roman emperor in 249 as a result of military victories. He made efforts to revive Rome's "golden age", adding the name of one of his most admired predecessors, Trajan, to his own, revived the ancient office of censor and restored the Colosseum. Restoration of traditional Roman piety was another of his aims, and after performing the annual sacrifice to Jupiter on 3 January 250, he issued an edict, the text of which is lost, ordering sacrifices to the gods to be made throughout the empire. Jews were specifically exempted from this requirement.

== Requirements of the edict ==
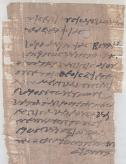
Libellus from the Decian persecution 250 AD certifying that the holder has sacrificed to the Roman gods

The edict ordered that everyone in the Empire, with the exception of Jews, must sacrifice and burn incense to the gods and to the well-being of the Emperor in the presence of a Roman magistrate, and get a written certificate, called a libellus, that this had been done, signed by the magistrate and witnesses. Numerous examples of these libelli survive from Egypt, for instance:

To the commission chosen to superintend the sacrifices. From Aurelia Ammonous, daughter of Mystus, of the Moeris quarter, priestess of the god Petesouchos, the great, the mighty, the immortal, and priestess of the gods in the Moeris quarter. I have sacrificed to the gods all my life, and now again, in accordance with the decree and in your presence, I have made sacrifice, and poured a libation, and partaken of the sacred victims. I request you to certify this below.

== Exemption of the Jews ==
Julius Caesar had formulated a policy of allowing Jews to follow their traditional religious practices, a policy which was followed, and extended, by Augustus. This gave Judaism the status of a religio licita (permitted religion) throughout the Empire. Roman authorities respected tradition in religion, and the Jews followed the beliefs and practices of their ancestors. It was well understood that Jews would not perform sacrifices to the Roman gods or burn incense before an image of the Emperor. In contrast, the Christians were a new phenomenon, and one that did not seem like a religion to Roman authorities at all; both the earliest extant Roman references to Christianity, Pliny the Younger and Tacitus in his Annals about 116, refer to Christianity as superstitio, excessive and non-traditional religiosity that was socially disruptive. Christians had abandoned the religion of their forefathers, and were seeking to convert others, which seemed dangerous to the Romans; refusal to sacrifice for the emperor's well-being appeared seditious.

== Effects of the edict on Christians ==
Christians were prohibited by their faith from worshipping the Roman gods or burning incense before an image of the Emperor. Refusal resulted in the deaths of some notable Christians, including Pope Fabian, Babylas of Antioch and Alexander of Jerusalem. The number of people put to death for refusing to obtain a certificate is unknown. Large numbers of Christians performed the sacrifices as required, so much so that authorities at Carthage were overwhelmed by the numbers seeking a certificate and were forced to issue a notice requesting people to come back the next day. Many other Christians also went into hiding, especially in Egypt, Africa and Anatolia, including Dionisius of Alexandria and Cyprianus of Carthage.

== After the edict ==
The effects of the edict on Christian communities, many of which had until then lived peacefully and undisturbed, were traumatic. Many lapsed in their faith, and their readmission into the Christian community was opposed by the schismatic Novatian. By 251, efforts to enforce the edict had died down, and although short-lived, the "Decian persecution" became in the collective memory of the church an episode of monstrous tyranny.

Decius died in June 251, causing his edict to lapse; it had been in force for approximately eighteen months. Deliberate persecution of Christians within the empire resumed in 257 AD under emperor Valerian followed by a period of relative tolerance under Gallienus before intensifying again in 303 AD during the Diocletianic Persecution.

== See also ==
- Persecution of Christians in the Roman Empire
