= Uncial 0301 =

- New Testament manuscript
- Text: John 17:1-4 †
- Date: 5th century
- Script: Greek-Coptic diglot
- Now at: Schøyen Collection
- Size: 6.8 x 7 cm

Uncial 0301 (in the Gregory-Aland numbering), is a Greek-Coptic diglot uncial manuscript of the New Testament. Paleographically it has been assigned to the 5th century.

== Description ==
The codex contains two small parts of the text of the Gospel of John 17:1-2.2-4, on a fragment of single parchment leaf (6.82 cm by 7 cm). It was written in one column per page, 14 lines per page, in uncial letters.

Because it is very small fragment, it was suggested that it is a talisman, but the manuscript is more probable.

Currently it is dated by the INTF to the 5th century, and is housed at the Schøyen Collection (1367) in Oslo.

== See also ==
- List of New Testament uncials
- Biblical manuscripts
- Textual criticism
