= Bodleian Art, Archaeology and Ancient World Library =

Library of the University of Oxford, England

Coordinates: 51°45′20″N 1°15′40″W

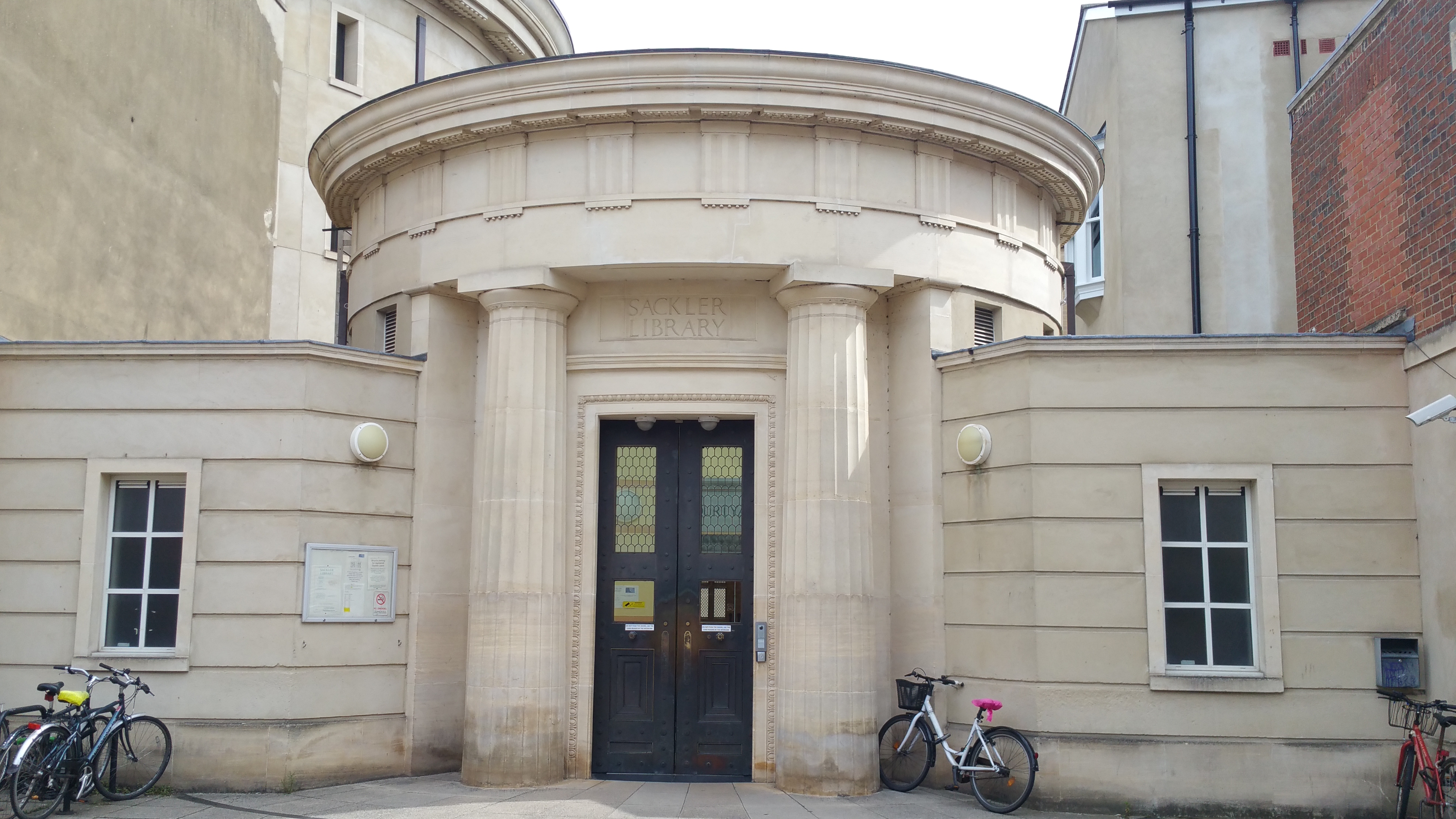
- The library entrance on St John Street, Oxford
- Location: St John Street, Oxford, England
- Type: Academic library
- Established: 2001

Collection
- Items collected: The University of Oxford collection specialising in archaeology, art history and classics
- Size: 300,000
- Legal deposit: receives legal deposit books in relevant subject areas via the Bodleian's copyright receipt office

Access and use
- Access requirements: Current University Card. Bona fide researchers may register to use the Library for reference only.

Other information
- Employees: 32
- Website: https://www.bodleian.ox.ac.uk/art

The Bodleian Art, Archaeology and Ancient World Library (‘Bodleian Art Library’ in its shortened form, formerly the Sackler Library) holds a large portion of the classical, art historical, and archaeological works belonging to the University of Oxford, England.

== History ==
The library building was completed in 2001 and opened on 24 September of that year, enabling the rehousing of the library of the Ashmolean Museum. The library entrance is at 1 St John Street. It was principally funded by a donation from the multi-millionaire Mortimer Sackler. It was designed by Robert Adam with Paul Hanvey of ADAM Architecture. Its main building is a circular drum, a reference to the Classical origins of many of its holdings. One of the outer walls of the drum is decorated by a Classical frieze. The architects claim the circular entrance vestibule is derived from the Doric Temple of Apollo at Bassae, first excavated by Charles Robert Cockerell, the architect who designed the adjacent Ashmolean Museum. The library is administered as part of the multi-site Bodleian Library, the central libraries of the University of Oxford.

== Renaming ==
The library was originally named for the Sackler family, whose funding of the arts became controversial in the context of the opioid epidemic. It was renamed the Bodleian Art, Archaeology and Ancient World Library at a meeting of the University Council on 15 May 2023, following a review of the university's relationship with the family.

== Collections ==
The library's holdings incorporate the collections of four older libraries, namely the Ashmolean library, the Classics Lending Library, the Eastern Art Library, the Griffith Institute and the History of Art Library. Major subject areas are:

- Western European Art since c. AD 1000
- History of Art
- Classical and Byzantine art and archaeology
- Papyrology and Greco-Roman Egypt
- Near Eastern archaeology and cuneiform languages
- Egyptology and Coptic
- Ancient history
- Epigraphy
- Classical languages and literature
- Prehistoric archaeology of Europe and North Africa
- Archaeology of Roman provinces
- Medieval European archaeology
- Theoretical and scientific archaeology
- Numismatics

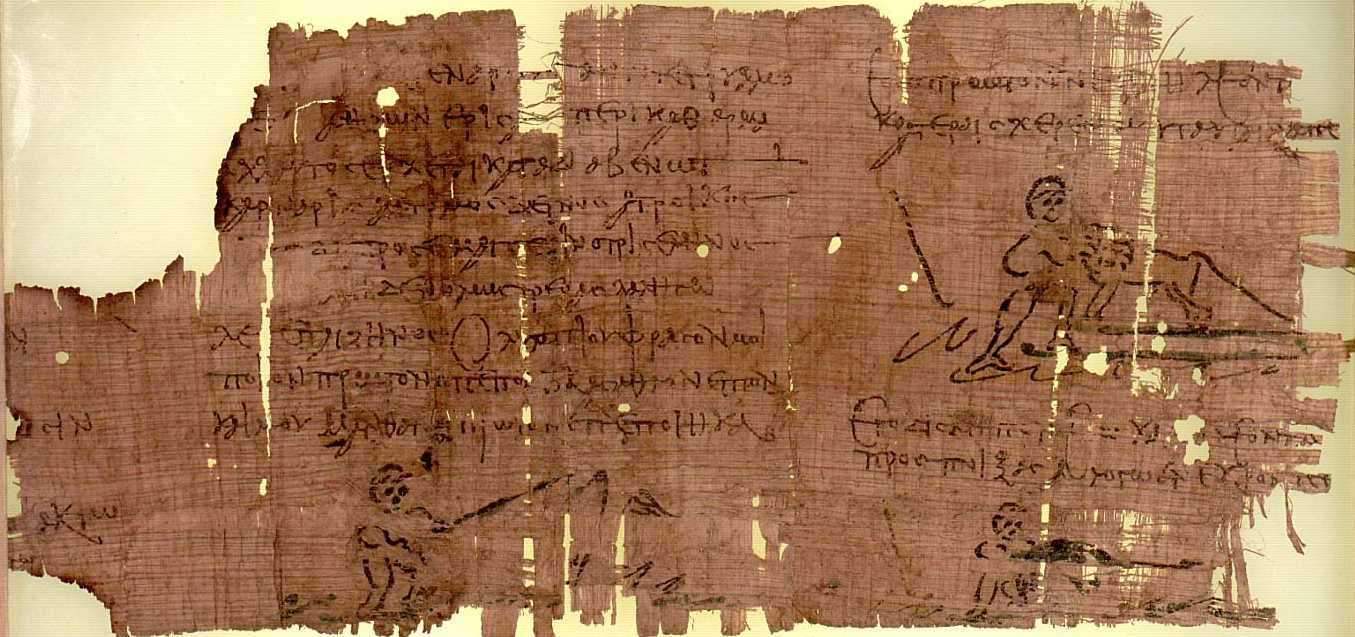
The Heracles Papyrus, held by the Bodleian Art, Archaeology and Ancient World Library.

Among the celebrated holdings are the Heracles Papyrus, a fragment of 3rd century Greek manuscript containing a poem about the Labours of Heracles, along with over 100,000 fragments found at Oxyrhynchus known as the Oxyrhynchus Papyri.

== See also ==
- Category:Sackler library manuscripts
