= Papyrus Oxyrhynchus 3035 =

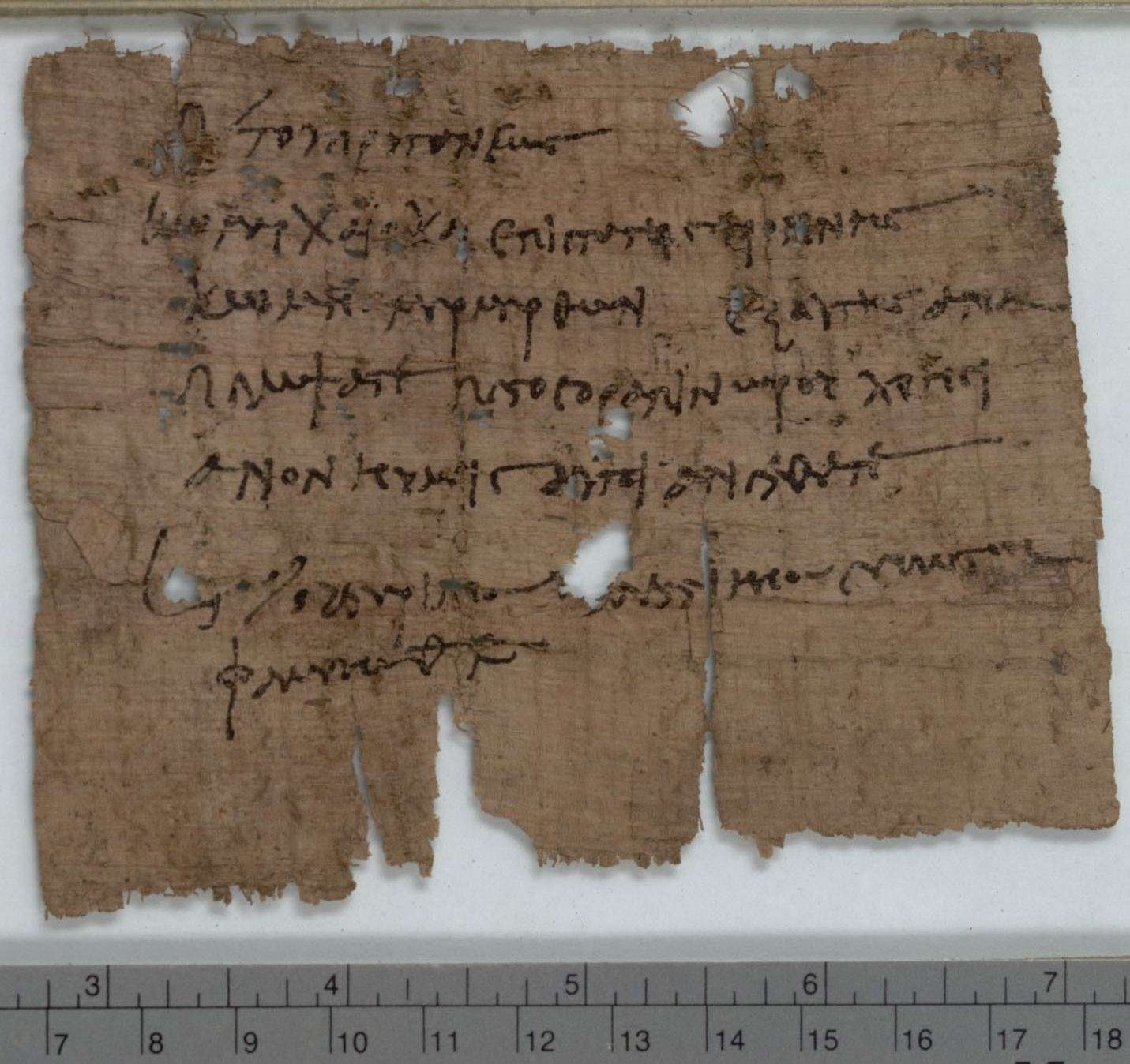
Papyrus Oxyrhynchus 3035

Papyrus Oxyrhynchus 3035 (or P. Oxy. XLII 3035) is a warrant for the arrest of a Christian, issued by the authorities of the Roman Empire. This is one of the earliest uses of the word Christian attested on papyrus.

The order was issued by the head of the Oxyrhynchus ruling council, to the police in a country village, to arrest a man described as a Christian (note χρισιανόν, the papyrus has the early spelling, χρησιανόν). The charge which makes the Christian liable for arrest is not given.

The manuscript is dated precisely in its closing lines to the third year of the co-regency of Valerian and Gallienus his son, in the third day of the Egyptian month Phamenoth (known as Paremhat in the Coptic calendar). The equivalent date in the Gregorian calendar is 28 February 256 AD.

== Text ==
1	π[αρὰ] τοῦ πρυτάνεως	From the governor
2	κωμάρχαις καὶ ἐπιστάταις εἰρήνης	to village rulers and officers of peace
3	κώμης Μερμέρθων. ἐξαυτῆς ἀνα-	of the village of Mermerthon. At once
4	πέμψατε Πετοσαρᾶπιν Ὥρου χρησι-	send up Petosarapin of Horus a Christian,
5	ανὸν, ἢ ὑμεῖς αὐτοὶ ἀνέλθατε.	or you yourselves come up.
6	[ἔτους] 3 Οὐαλεριανοῦ καὶ Γαλλιηνοῦ Σεβαστῶν	During the third year of Valerian and Gallienus the August [pl.]
7	Φαμενὼθ 3.	Phamenoth 3.

== See also ==
- Libellus
- Oxyrhynchus papyri
