= Lapsi (Christianity) =

Christians who bowed to external pressure

In the early Christian Church, lapsi (Latin for "fallen;" Greek: πεπτωκότες, romanized: peptōkotes) were apostates who renounced their faith under persecution by Roman authorities. The term refers to those who have lapsed or fallen away from their faith, only to return to it later.

It could also be considered as the opposite of the concept of the Martyr, who are those who prefer to accept suffering and death rather than deny their faith.

== Origins ==
The Decian persecution of 250 AD, which required all citizens of the Roman Empire to publicly sacrifice to traditional gods, created unrest within the Church. Christians who submitted to pressure and made public sacrifice were called lapsed or lapsi. Upon completion of sacrifice, individuals received a certificate of sacrifice, or libellus, a legal document proving conformity with Roman religion. To avoid this test, many members of the clergy fled, leaving their communities without leadership. In their absence, lay people who had not lapsed, called confessors, filled their leadership role.

After the execution of Pope Fabian, Bishop Cyprian of Carthage went into hiding. When he returned to Carthage, he found these confessors assumed authority of clergy, especially forgiveness of sin. Although many confessors willingly relinquished their positions of authority upon the clergies' return, some attempted to retain their positions. Cyprian called a council in 251 AD to address this problem, the root of which was the status of the lapsi. Confessors tended to accept lapsi back into communion, while the clergy demanded harsher punishments.

This difference of opinion in how to treat the lapsi was part of a larger picture which threatened the cohesion of the Christian church at that time. After Fabian’s execution, Cornelius succeeded him as Pope. Cornelius and Cyprian believed that the lapsi could be restored to communion through repentance and penance. A Roman priest named Novatian believed that lapsi should not be allowed to return to the church as they could not be forgiven on earth, but only by God. Novatian stood against Cornelius and was proclaimed as the new Pope. He then created a stricter ‘Church of the Pure’ which ran for several centuries. Another priest (Novatus) disagreed with both popes and took the opinion that all lapsi should be taken back without asking for any penance or apology.

Cyprian was able to avoid full schism by identifying five categories of lapsi and assigning penance appropriate to each.

== Classifications ==
After the 250 AD Decian Persecution, Cyprian of Carthage held a council sometime after Easter 251 AD, in which lapsi were classified into five categories:

- Sacrificati: Those who had actually offered a sacrifice to the idols. Christians that made sacrifices, especially to Roman gods, were only offered absolution on their deathbeds.
- Thurificati: Those who had burnt incense on the altar before the statues of the gods. From Latin thurificare – "burn incense"
- Libellatici: Those who had drawn up attestation (libellus), or had, by bribing the authorities, caused such certificates to be drawn up for them, representing them as having offered sacrifice, without, however, having actually done so. A two-year sanction was imposed as penance. From Latin libellus – "little book; letter; certificate"
- Acta facientes: Those that made false statements or other acts to save their lives. From Latin – "those doing the acts"
- Traditores: Those who gave up sacred scriptures, artifacts and/or revealed names of fellow Christians. From Latin tradere - "hand over; deliver; betray" (source of the English "traitor").

At Rome, the principle was established that the apostates should not be abandoned, but that they should be exhorted to do penance, so that, in case of their being again cited before the authorities, they might atone for their apostasy by remaining steadfast.

== See also ==
- Pope Stephen I
- Judaizers
- Backsliding
- Crypto-paganism

== Bibliography ==
- Cyprian of Carthage: De lapsis and De Ecclesiae Catholicae unitate. Text and translation by Maurice Bévenot. Oxford: Clarendon Press, 1971
- W.H.C Frend: The Rise of Christianity. Philadelphia: Fortress Press, 1984. Page 318-323.
- Catholic Encyclopedia, 1908: Novatian
- Christian Cyclopedia - Lutheran Missouri Synod: Lapsi
- Collins, William Edward (1911). "Libellatici" . In Chisholm, Hugh (ed.). Encyclopædia Britannica. Vol. 16 (11th ed.). Cambridge University Press. pp. 537–538.
