= Oxyrhynchus =

City in Ptolemaic/Roman Egypt

Oxyrhynchus: البهنسا (Arabic); ⲡⲉⲙϫⲉ (Coptic); Ὀξύρρυγχος (Ancient Greek); Al-Bahnasa
- City
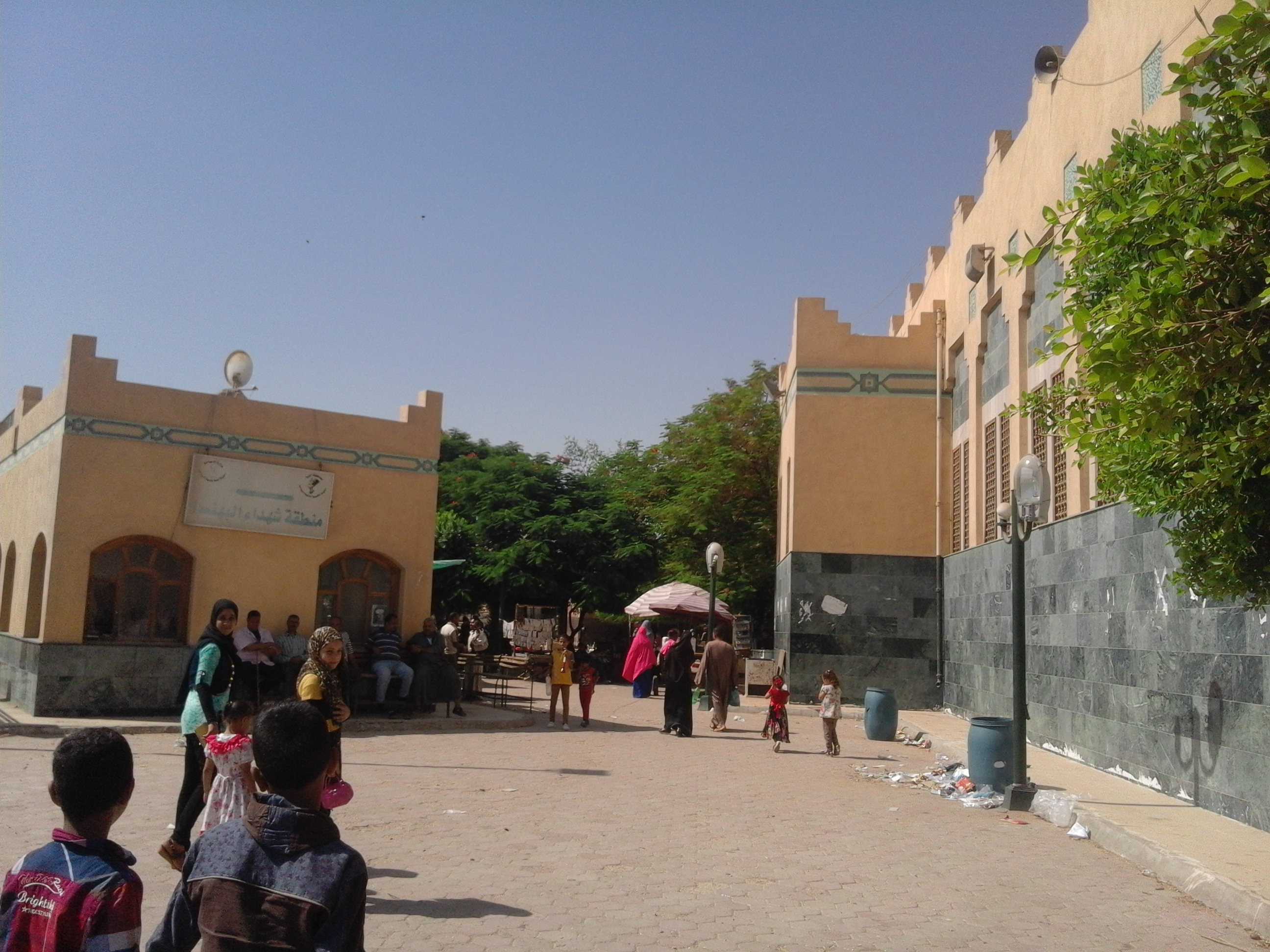
- Al-Bahnasa Martyr district, a cemetery of 5,000 prominent early Muslims during Early Muslim conquests

- Location within Egypt
- Coordinates: 28.531°N 30.647°E
- Country: Egypt
- Governorate: Minya
- Time zone: UTC+2 (EET)
  - Summer (DST): UTC+3 (EEST)

Oxyrhynchus (/ˌɒksɪˈrɪŋkəs/ OK-sih-RINK-əs; Ancient Greek: Ὀξύῤῥυγχος, romanized: Oxýrrhynkhos, lit. 'sharp-nosed', Koine Greek: [okˈsyr̥r̥yŋkʰos]; Ancient Egyptian: pr mꜥḏ; Coptic: ⲡⲉⲙϫⲉ or ⲡⲙ̅ϫⲏ, romanized: Pemdje), also known by its modern name Al-Bahnasa (Arabic: البهنسا, romanized: el-Bahnasa), is a city in Middle Egypt located about 160 km south-southwest of Cairo in Minya Governorate. It is also an important archaeological site. Since the late 19th century, the area around Oxyrhynchus has been excavated almost continually, yielding an enormous collection of papyrus texts dating from the Ptolemaic Kingdom and Roman Egypt. They also include a few vellum manuscripts, and more recent Arabic manuscripts on paper (for example, the medieval P. Oxy. VI 1006).

== History ==
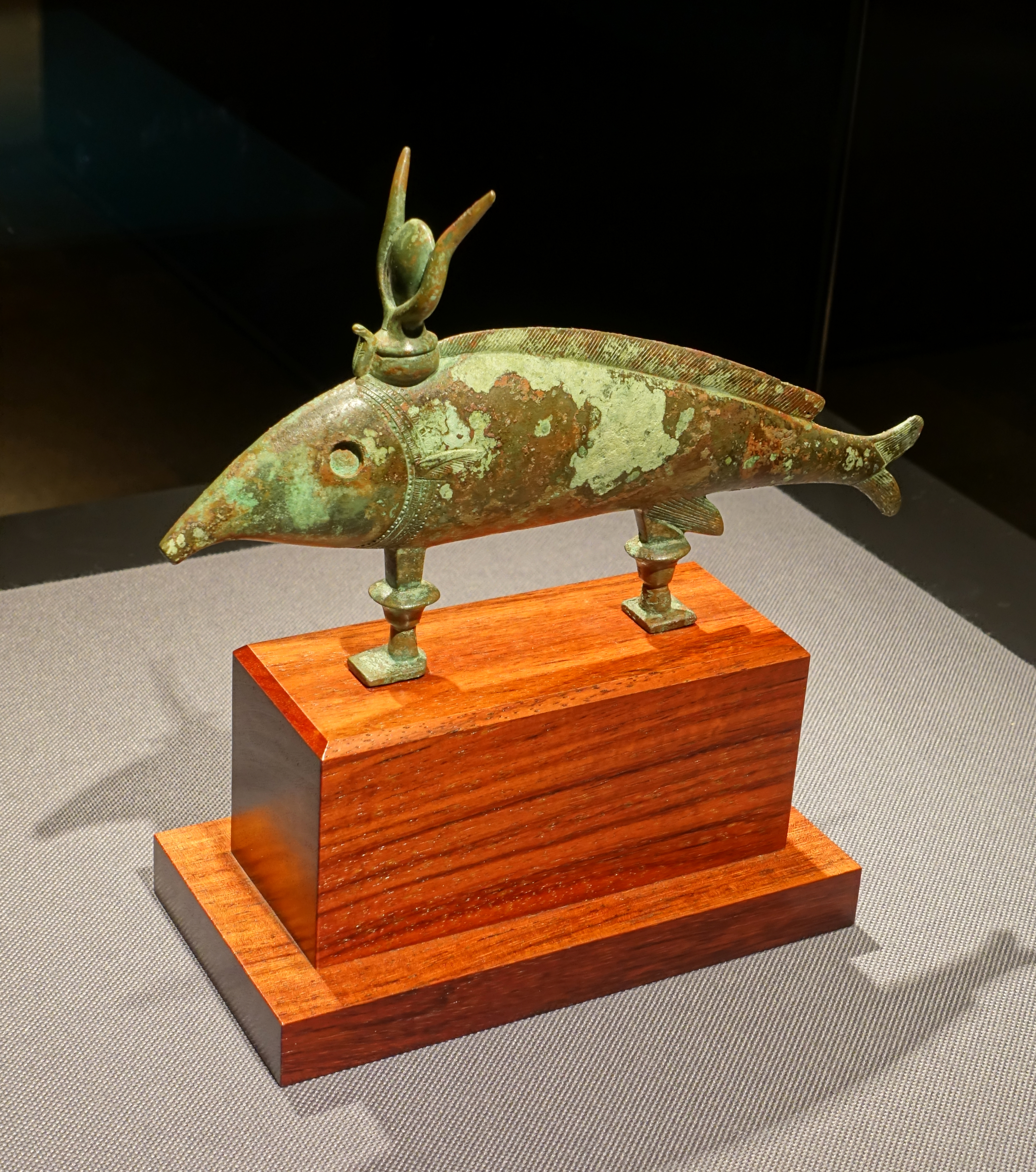
The medjed or oxyrhynchus worshipped as a deity

=== Ancient Egyptian era ===
pr Z1 G20 D N31 niwt
pr mꜥḏ
in hieroglyphs

pr Z1 m U29 A niwt
pr mḏꜣ
in hieroglyphs

Oxyrhynchus lies west of the main course of the Nile on the Bahr Yussef, a branch that terminates in Lake Moeris and the Faiyum oasis. In ancient Egyptian times, there was a city on the site called Per-Medjed, named after the medjed, a species of elephantfish of the Nile worshipped there as the fish that ate the penis of Osiris. It was the capital of the 19th Upper Egyptian Nome.

=== Ptolemaic era ===
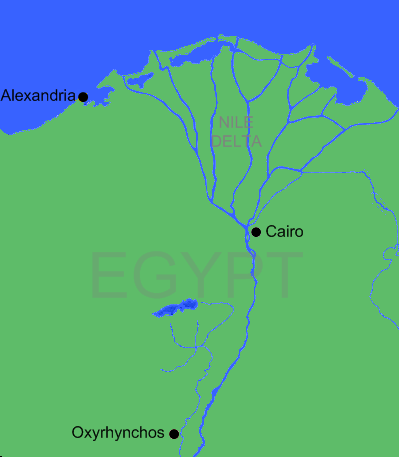
Location of Oxyrhynchus in Egypt.

After the conquest of Egypt by Alexander the Great in 332 BC, the city was reestablished as a Hellenistic town called Oxyrrhynchoupolis (Koine Greek: Ὀξυρρύγχου Πόλις, romanized: town of the sharp-snouted fish). In the Hellenistic period, Oxyrhynchus was a prosperous regional capital, the third-largest city in Egypt. After Egypt was Christianised, it became famous for its many churches and monasteries. Saints Sirenos, Philoxenos and Ioustos were venerated and had shrines dedicated to them in the city.

=== Roman era ===
Oxyrhynchus remained a prominent, though gradually declining, town in the Roman and Byzantine periods.

During the Jewish diaspora uprisings of AD 115–117, fighting spread to the nome of Oxyrhynchus. The Roman suppression led to the near-total expulsion and destruction of Jewish communities in Egypt. Papyrological evidence indicates that a local festival commemorating the Jewish defeat was still celebrated in Oxyrhynchus some eighty years later. Jewish life in the area did not revive until the third century, with a papyrus dated to AD 291 recording an active synagogue in Oxyrhynchus and identifying one of its officials as originating from Palestine.

From 619 to 629, during the brief period of Sasanian Egypt, three Greek papyri from Oxyrhynchus include references to large sums of gold that were to be sent to the emperor.

=== Arab era ===
During the era of Rashidun Caliphate, Oxyrhynchus was invaded and conquered by the Arab Rashidun army under the leadership of Khalid ibn al-Walid. At first, the Arabs sent an emissary, Al-Mughira to negotiate with the garrison commander of the city named Batlus. However, as the negotiation ended badly, the Rashidun forces then sent their troops to attack Bahnasa. The prospective Rashidun governor of Egypt, Amr ibn al-As, dispatched Khalid as the commander of this expedition, which took the route through Fustat.

Various early Islamic chroniclers, such as Al-Waqidi in his F̣utūh al-Bahnasā, and Muhammad ibn Muhammad al-Mu"izz in The Conquest of Bahnasa, reported that the Muslim armies under Khalid ibn al-Walid entered Bahnasa in 639, which was defended by 50,000 Byzantine and Sudanese Christian auxiliaries of Beja, (Note: The compilation records about the conquest of Sudan and southern Egypt were compiled in Futuhat Bahnasa and records of al-Maqrizi) reinforced by 1,300 elephant-riding mounted archers, and an anti cavalry unit named al-Quwwad armed with iron rods. These units were led by a Patrician named Batlus. Meanwhile, al-Maqqari stated 50,000 Christian army of Byzantine Sudanese christian alliance in the "Battle of Darishkur". Before the battle, the Rashidun army camped in a place called Dashur. The Byzantine historian Benjamin Hendrickx reported that the African Christians had mustered around 20,000 Sudanese Symmachoi corps a successor of Foederati auxiliary troops in the Roman empire that existed around 400-650 AD. the record of al-Maqrizi stated in this conflict, Dhiraar ibn al-Azwar, Miqdad ibn Aswad, Zubayr ibn al-Awwam, and Uqba ibn Amir each commanding muslims cavalry facing the elephant corps led by Byzantine exarchate commander named Batlus. The Rashidun cavalry armed with spears tips soaked in Santonin plants and sulfur and ignitedin order to cause the elephants to flee in terror, of the flaming spears. while the elephant riders were toppled from their seats and crushed underfoot on the ground. Meanwhile, the al-Quwwad warriors who used iron staves were routed by the Rashidun cavalry soldiers who seized chain weapons from their fellow al-Quwwad units.

Later, after they managed to defeat the Byzantine field army, the Rashidun forces besieged the city. There are two version about the siege, the first version narrated the siege was led by Khalid ibn al-Walid, who also brought an ex Sassanid Marzban and his 2,000 Persian convert soldiers in this campaign. The Persian Marzban suggested to Khalid to form a suicide squad to carry a wooden box filled with a mixture of sulfur and oil and place it at the gates, ignited it and blasting the gates (or melting the iron gate, according to the original translation), allowing the Arab army to enter the city. In the second version, the Muslim army led by Qays ibn Harith without much details of how the Muslims managed to subdue the city. However, this source mention that Qays ibn Harith name was used temporarily to rename Oxyrhynchus to honour his deeds in this campaign, before being changed to be al-Bahnasa.

After the Muslim conquest of Egypt in 641, the canal system on which the town depended fell into disrepair, and Oxyrhynchus was abandoned. Today the town of el Bahnasa occupies part of the ancient site. The Arabs called the city as "Al-Baqi' of Egypt", as the city was reputed to have 5,000 Sahaba buried in it. The large number of fallen Muslim soldiers buried in this city was due to major battles against the Roman army and their fortifications in this area.

Before it was renamed as "al-Bahnasa", Oxyrynchus were renamed as "Al-Qays town", by Maqrizi or "town of martyrs" in honor to one of the Muslim commander that participated in the conquest of Oxyrynchus. Ali Pasha Mubarak mentioned it in the compromise plans that it was a city that had great fame and its flat was about 1000 acres and the golden curtains were working and the length of the curtains was 30 cubits and its territory included 120 villages other than the plantations and the hamlets. The northern is Kandous, the western is the mountain, the tribal is Touma, and the eastern is the sea. Each gate had three towers, and there were forty ribats, palaces, and many mosques, and at its western end there is a famous place known as the Dome of Seven Maidens.

Among the most notable tombs were allegedly belong to the Muslim martyrs were the tombs of the children of Aqil bin Ali bin Abi Talib (brother of Ali, fourth Rashidun Caliph), Ziyad bin Abi Sufyan bin Abdul Muttalib (son of Abu Sufyan ibn Harb), Aban ibn Uthman bin Affan, Muhammad ibn Abi Abd al-Rahman bin Abi Bakr al-Siddiq (grandson of Abu Bakar), and Hassan al-Salih ibn Zayn al-Abidin bin al-Hussein (great-grandson of Ali).

Ibn Taghribirdi, a Mamluk era historian, also writing the history of Bahnasa conquest in his book, Al Duhur fi madaa al 'Ayaam wa al shuhur

The Muslims army settled in the town for three years as their base after the conquest, while launching occasional raids on the black and the coasts. Al-Qa`qa` bin Amr, Hashem, Abu Ayyub al-Ansari and Uqba ibn Nafi Al-Fihri, the future conqueror of Maghreb, and went with two thousand of Persians convert who now fight under the caliphate, and raided the border of Barqa.

=== Modern era ===
Today, there are many structures in Al-Bahnasa erected in honor of various Muslim conquerors who are regarded as heroes by the locals. For example, the mosque of Hasan al-Salah was built in honor of a man (the great-grandson of Ali) who participated in the conquest of Al-Bahnasa. It is the only mosque in Egypt that has two mihrabs. Other examples include the tomb of Sidi Fath al-Bab, the mosque of Sidi Ali al-Jamam, and a large cemetery in which many people that participated in the Arab conquest of Egypt are buried. There are also many domes in Bahnasa which are attributed to soldiers such as Muhammad bin Uqbah bin Amer Al-Juhani and Ubadah bin Al-Samit.

There was also a particular mosque called Dome of Seven Maidens, which allegedly was built to honor seven Oxyrhynchus Coptic girls who defected and helped the Muslim armies under 'Amr ibn al-As and now venerated for their effort in the conquest of the city. As the town of al-Bahnasa now contained thousands of historical structures in memoir of the conquests, including the 5,000 graves of companions of the prophet and Tabi'un martyrs of the battle of Bahnasa, the town are regarded by locals as "al-Baqi' of Egypt", which became the point of interest for many foreign tourists particularly from the Muslim majority country.

== Archaeological excavation ==
In 1882, Egypt, while still nominally part of the Ottoman Empire, came under effective British rule, and British archaeologists began the systematic exploration of the country. Because Oxyrhynchus was not considered an Ancient Egyptian site of any importance, it was neglected until 1896, when two young excavators, Bernard Pyne Grenfell and Arthur Surridge Hunt, both fellows of The Queen's College, Oxford, began to excavate it. "My first impressions on examining the site were not very favourable," wrote Grenfell. "The rubbish mounds were nothing but rubbish mounds." However, they very soon realized what they had found. The unique combination of climate and circumstance had left at Oxyrhynchus an unequalled archive of the ancient world. "The flow of papyri soon became a torrent," Grenfell recalled. "Merely turning up the soil with one's boot would frequently disclose a layer."

There is an on-line table of contents briefly listing the type of contents of each papyrus or fragment.

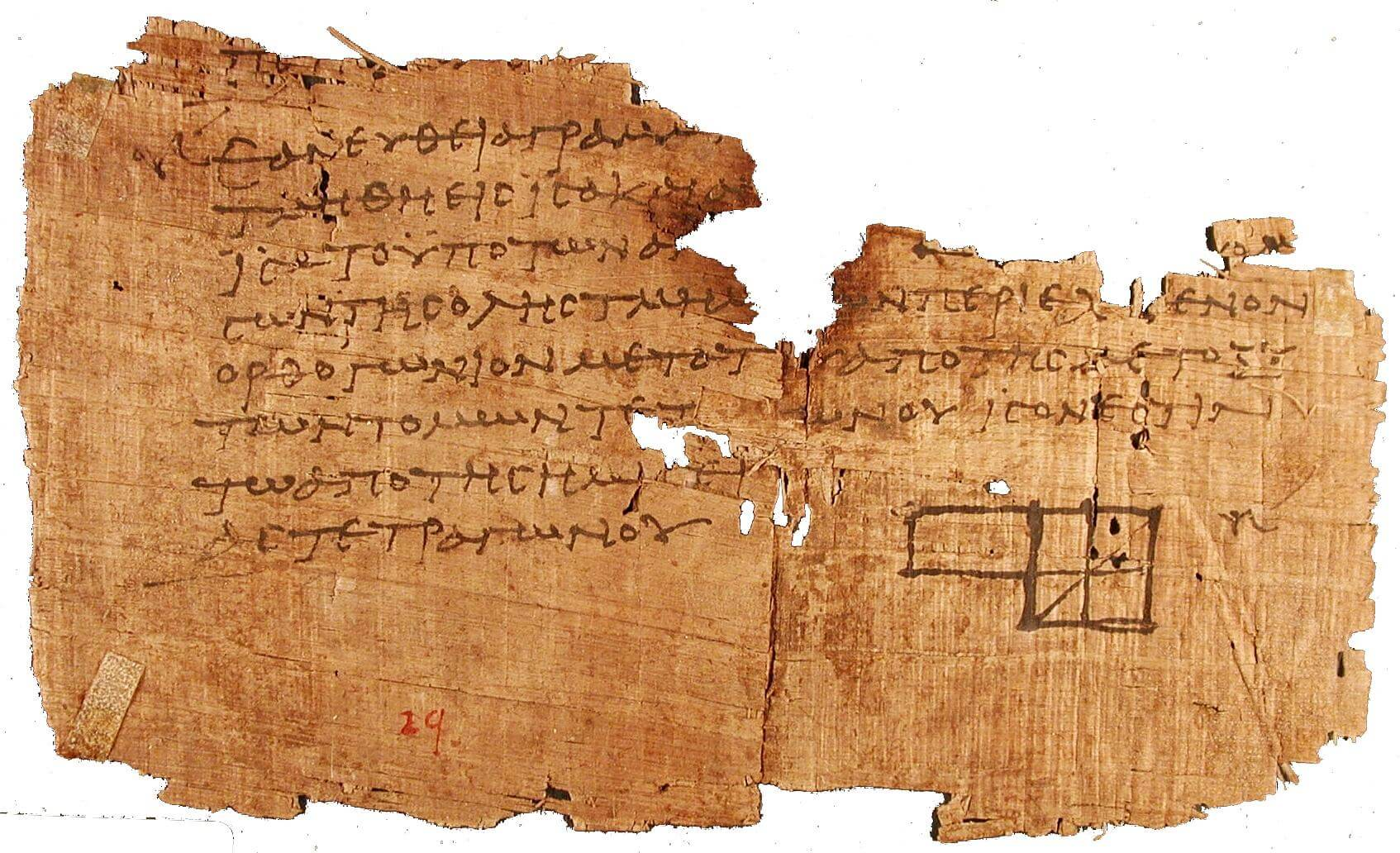
An Oxyrhynchus papyrus, dated 75–125 AD. It describes one of the oldest diagrams of Euclid's Elements.

Since the 1930s, work on the papyri has continued. For many years it was under the supervision of Professor Peter Parsons of Oxford. Eighty large volumes of the Oxyrhynchus Papyri have been published.

Since the days of Grenfell and Hunt, the focus of attention at Oxyrhynchus has shifted. Modern archaeologists are interested in learning about the social, economic, and political life of the ancient world. This shift in emphasis had made Oxyrhynchus, if anything, even more important, for the very ordinariness of most of its preserved documents makes them most valuable for modern scholars of social history. Many works on Egyptian and Roman social and economic history and on the history of Christianity rely heavily on documents from Oxyrhynchus.

A joint project with Brigham Young University using multi-spectral imaging technology has been extremely successful in recovering previously illegible writing. With this technology, many pictures are taken of an illegible papyrus using different filters, each finely tuned to capture only certain wavelengths of light. Thus, researchers can find the optimum spectral portion for distinguishing ink from paper in order to display otherwise completely illegible papyri. The amount of text potentially to be deciphered by this technique is huge. A selection of the images obtained during the project and more information on the latest discoveries has been provided on the project's website.

On June 21, 2005, the Times Literary Supplement published the text and translation of a newly reconstructed poem by Sappho, together with discussion by Martin L. West. Part of this poem was first published in 1922 from an Oxyrhynchus papyrus, no. 1787 (fragment 1). Most of the rest of the poem has now been found on a papyrus kept at Cologne University.

In May 2020, an Egyptian-Catalan archaeological mission headed by Esther Pons and Maite Mascort revealed a unique cemetery consisting of one room built with glazed limestone dating back to the 26th Dynasty (the so-called El-Sawi era). Archaeologists also uncovered bronze coins, clay seals, Roman tombstones and small crosses.

In February 2023, 16 individual tombs and 6 funerary complex from the Persian, Roman and Coptic periods and 2 deposited frogs were discovered by the Egyptian-Spanish archaeological mission. Majority of the bodies preserved with decorated shrouds were revealed alongside the pottery vessels and lamps.

In April 2026, an archaeological mission led by the University of Barcelona and the Institute of the Ancient Near East uncovered a significant Roman-era tomb complex that provides evidence of complex, syncretic funerary traditions. The excavation revealed a range of mortuary practices, including mummification with linen wraps and gold leaf, as well as the deposition of cremated remains within limestone chambers alongside animal offerings, such as a feline head. The recovery of ritual objects, specifically three golden and one copper tongue, suggests a practice intended to allow the deceased to communicate in the afterlife, while the discovery of a papyrus fragment containing a passage from Homer’s Iliad and various bronze and terracotta figurines such as Cupid and Harpocrates underscores the fusion of Greek literary culture and Greco-Roman religious iconography with local Egyptian burial customs.

=== Archaeological structures of Muslim conquest ===
The Egyptian Ministry of Tourism and Antiquities expressed their interest in a project to restore the tombs of the Al-Bahnasa, an ancient city, in which many papyri dating back to the Greco-Roman era were found, as well as a number of tombs for the companions of Muhammad. In 2021, Egypt's head of Islamic, Coptic, Jewish antiquities sector followed up on the progress of the restoration.

In March 2020, archeological researchers from the Antiquities Inspection of Al-Bahnasa District located archaeological evidence of the encampment of Khalid ibn al-Walid and 10,000 soldiers under him, including 70 veterans of the Battle of Badr. The excavators said the Muslim armies' encampments were located in the current location of the village of Beni Hilal, Minya District, west of Bahnasa.

== See also ==
- Hellanicus of Lesbos
- Heracles Papyrus
- Oxyrhynchus Gospels
- Oxyrhynchus hymn
- Villa of the Papyri
- The Trackers of Oxyrhynchus

== Bibliography ==
- The Oxyrhynchus Logia and the Apocryphal Gospels. (2007). Gardners Books.ISBN 978-1-4304-5596-7
- Abdel Aziz Munir, Amr (2012). Abdel Aziz Munir, Amr (ed.). قصة البهنسا: حكاية غزوة [The Story of Bahnasa.. A Story of a Battle] (paperback) (in Arabic). Egyptian General Authority for Cultural Palaces; Department of History at the Faculty of Arts. ISBN 978-977-718-017-7.
- H. Blumell, Lincoln (2012). "Epilogue. The Demise of Christian Oxyrhynchus". Lettered Christians (Biblical Studies). Brill. pp. 295–300. doi:10.1163/9789004180987_008. ISBN 9789004180987. "Futuh al-Bahnasa al Gharra, 'the conquest of Bahnasa, the blessed', by Muhammad ibn Muhammad al-Mu'izz"
- Hendrickx, Benjamin (2012). "THE BORDER TROOPS OF THE ROMAN-BYZANTINE SOUTHERN EGYPTIAN LIMES: PROBLEMS AND REMARKS ON THE ROLE OF THE AFRICAN AND 'BLACK' AFRICAN MILITARY UNITS". Ekklesiastikos Pharos. 94. hdl:10520/EJC128657. Benjamin Hendrickx in Deutsch wikipedia
- Muḥammad ibn ʻUmar Wāqidī (1934). F̣utūh al-Bahnasā al-Gharāʻ (in Arabic). the University of Michigan.
- Norris, H. T. (1986). "THE FUTŪḤ AL-BAHNASĀ: And its relation to pseudo-"Maġāzī" and "Futūḥ" literature, Arabic "Siyar" and Western Chanson de Geste in the Middle Ages". Quaderni di Studi Arabi. 4: 76–78. JSTOR 25802579.
