= P26 =

P26 or P-26 may refer to:

- Boeing P-26 Peashooter, an American fighter aircraft
- P26/40 tank, an Italian World War II tank
- Papyrus 26, a biblical manuscript
- Paratech P26, a Swiss paraglider
- Phosphorus-26, an isotope of phosphorus
- Projekt-26, a stay-behind army in Switzerland
- Pseudomonas sRNA P26
