= Uncial 0185 =

- New Testament manuscript
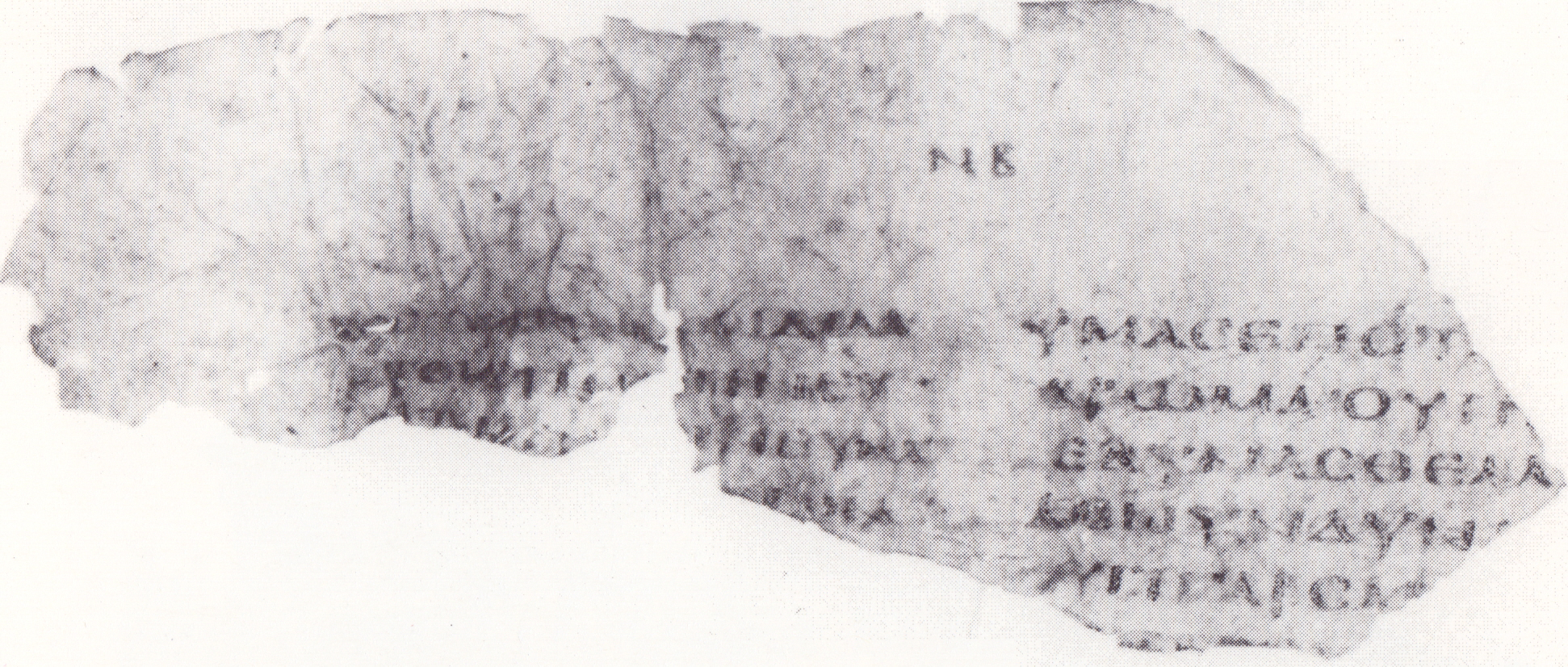
- Text: 1 Corinthians 2:5-6,9,13; 3:2-3
- Date: 4th-century
- Script: Greek
- Now at: Papyrus Collection of the Austrian National Library
- Size: 19 x 15 cm
- Type: Alexandrian text-type
- Category: II

Uncial 0185 (in the Gregory-Aland numbering) is a Greek uncial manuscript of the New Testament, dated palaeographically to the 4th-century.

== Description ==
The codex contains small parts of the First Epistle to the Corinthians 2:5-6, 9, 13; 3:2-3, on one parchment leaf (19 cm by 15 cm). This leaf has survived in a fragmentary condition. The text is written in two columns per page, 24 lines per page, in uncial letters.

The Greek text of this codex is a representative of the Alexandrian text-type. Aland placed it in Category II.

It was written and found in Egypt. Currently it is dated by the INTF to the 4th century. Karl Wessely published its transcription.

The codex currently is housed at the Papyrus Collection of the Austrian National Library (Pap. G. 39787) in Vienna.

== See also ==
- List of New Testament uncials
- Textual criticism
