= Uncial 0181 =

- New Testament manuscript
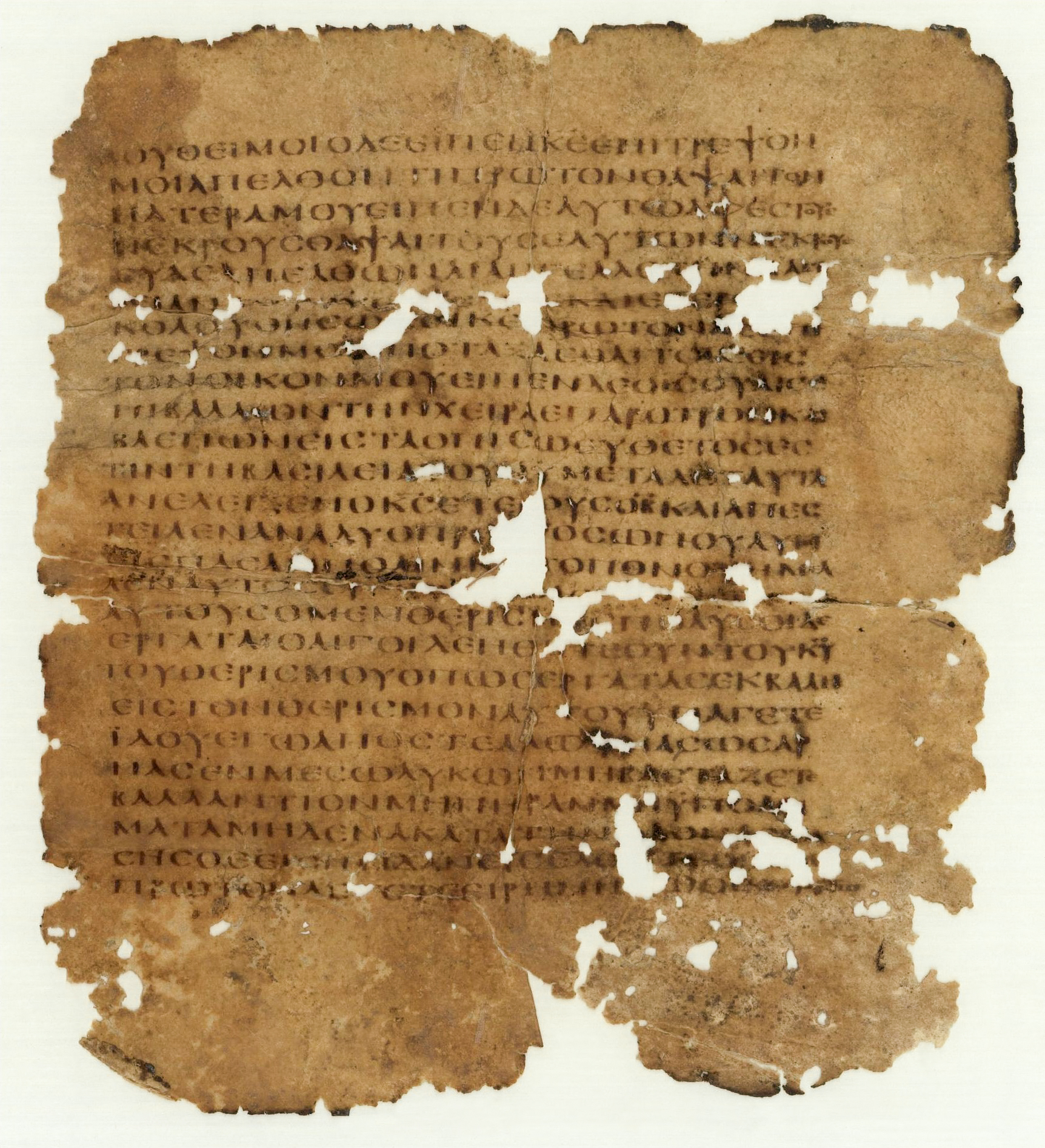
- Side recto with the text of Luke 9:59-10:5
- Text: Luke 9:59-10:14
- Date: 4th / 5th-century
- Script: Greek
- Now at: Papyrus Collection of the Austrian National Library
- Size: 15 x 14 cm
- Type: Alexandrian text-type
- Category: II

Uncial 0181 (in the Gregory-Aland numbering), is a Greek uncial manuscript of the New Testament, dated paleographically to the 4th-century (or the 5th).

== Description ==
The codex contains a small parts of the Gospel of Luke 9:59-10:14, on one parchment leaf (15 cm by 14 cm). The text is written in one column per page, 26 lines per page, in uncial letters.

The Greek text of this codex is a representative of the Alexandrian text-type. Aland placed it in Category II.

Currently it is dated by the INTF to the 4th or 5th century.

The codex is housed at the Papyrus Collection of the Austrian National Library (Pap. G. 39778) in Vienna.

== See also ==
- List of New Testament uncials
- Textual criticism
