= Uncial 098 =

- New Testament manuscript
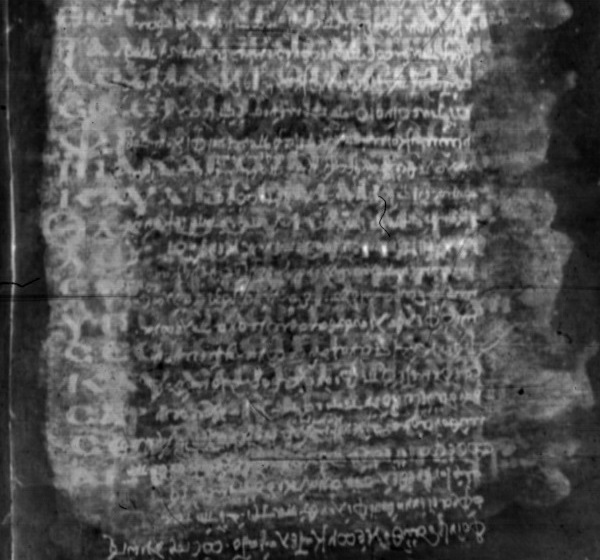
- Name: Codex Cryptoferratensis
- Text: 2 Corinthians 11 †
- Date: 7th-century
- Script: Greek
- Now at: Biblioteca della Badia
- Size: 22.2 x 16 cm
- Type: Alexandrian text-type
- Category: I

Uncial 098 (in the Gregory-Aland numbering), α 1025 (Soden), is a Greek uncial manuscript of the New Testament, dated palaeographically to the 7th-century. It is also named Codex Cryptoferratensis (from the place of housing).

== Description ==
The codex contains a small part of the Second epistle to the Corinthians 11:9–19, on one parchment leaf (22.2 cm by 16 cm). The text is written in one column per page, 24 lines per page (size of text 16.6 by 10.3 cm), in uncial letters. The initial letters are bigger. It lacks breathings and accents.

The nomina sacra are written in an abbreviated way.

It is a palimpsest; the upper text contains the Iliad (10th century).

== Text ==
The Greek text of this codex is a representative of the Alexandrian text-type. Kurt Aland placed it in Category I.

In 2 Corinthians 11:14 it has the reading ου θαυμα as do codices Sinaiticus, Vaticanus, Bezae, Augiensis, Boernerianus, Porphyrianus, Uncial 0243, Minuscule 6, 33, 81, 326, 365, 630, 1175, 1739, 1881, 2464; the majority has the reading ου θαυμαστον (D^{2}, Ψ, 0121a, Byz).

In 2 Corinthians 11:16: καγω μικρον for τι μικρον τι καγω;

In 2 Corinthians 11:17: ου κατα κυριον λαλω for ου λαλω κατα κυριον;

In 2 Corinthians 11:18: κατα σαρκα for κατα την σαρκα;

== History ==
Currently it is dated by the INTF to the 7th-century.

The manuscript was cited by Tischendorf, edited by Giuseppe Cozza-Luzi amongst other old fragments at Rome in 1867 with facsimile.

The codex is located now in the Biblioteca della Badia (Z' a' 24) in Grottaferrata.

== See also ==
- List of New Testament uncials
- Textual criticism
