= Uncial 0183 =

Greek manuscript of the New Testament

- New Testament manuscript
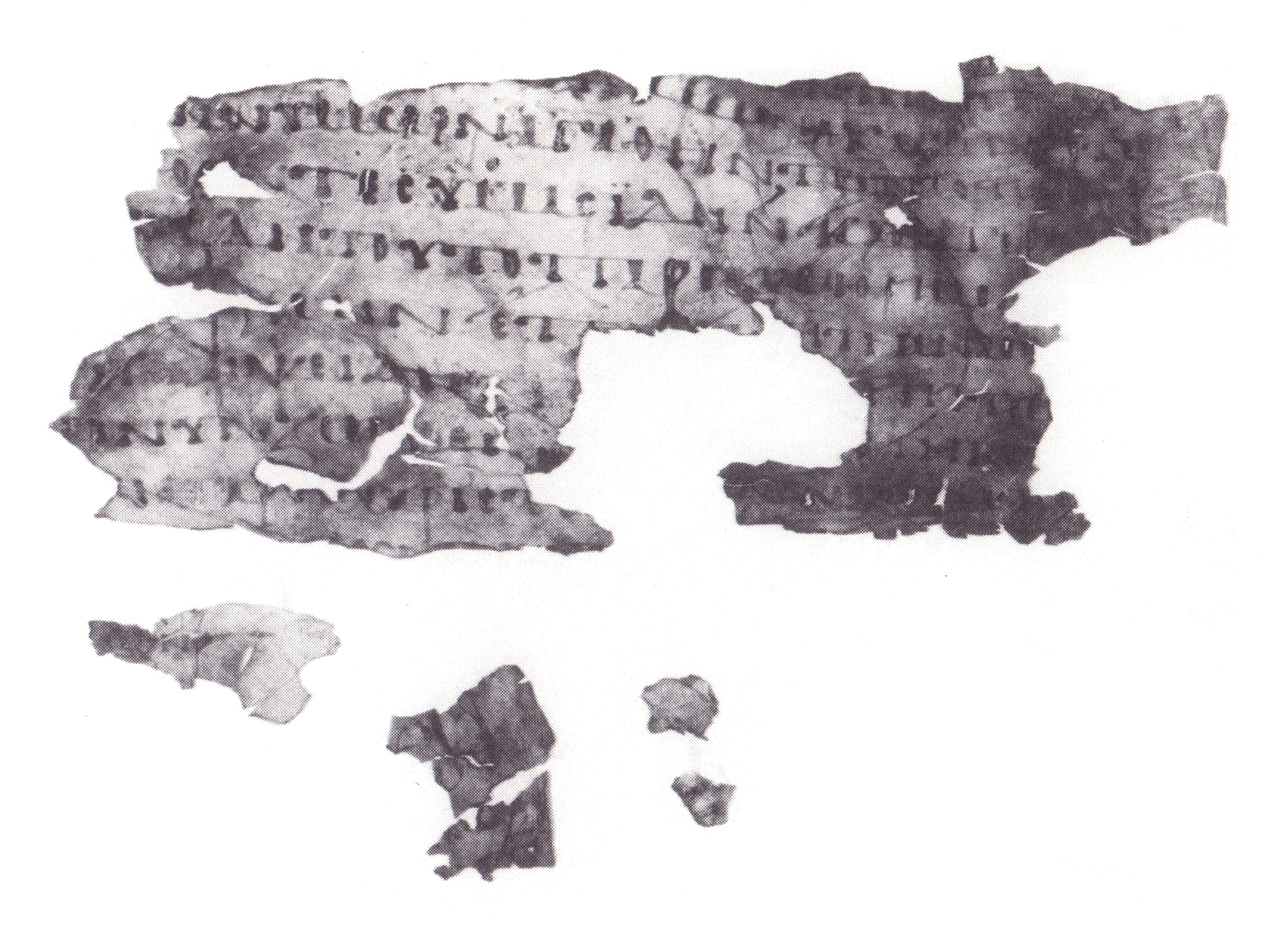
- Uncial 0183 (Gregory-Aland), side recto with the Text of 1 Thess 3:6-9.
- Text: 1 Thess 3:6-9; 4:1-5
- Date: 7th century
- Script: Greek
- Now at: Papyrus Collection of the Austrian National Library
- Size: 26 x 16 cm
- Type: Alexandrian text-type
- Category: III

Uncial 0183 (in the Gregory-Aland numbering), is a Greek uncial manuscript of the New Testament, dated palaeographically to the 7th century.

== Description ==
The codex contains a small parts of the First Epistle to the Thessalonians 3:6-9; 4:1-5, on one parchment leaf (26 cm by 16 cm). The text is written in one column per page, 28 lines per page, in uncial letters.

The Greek text of this codex is a representative of the Alexandrian text-type, with many singular omissions. Aland placed it in Category III.

Currently it is dated by the INTF to the 7th century. According to Karl Wessely it was found in Fayyum.

The codex currently is housed at the Papyrus Collection of the Austrian National Library (Pap. G. 39785) in Vienna.

== See also ==
- List of New Testament uncials
- Textual criticism
