= Papyrus 57 =

Papyrus 𝔓^{57}
- New Testament manuscript
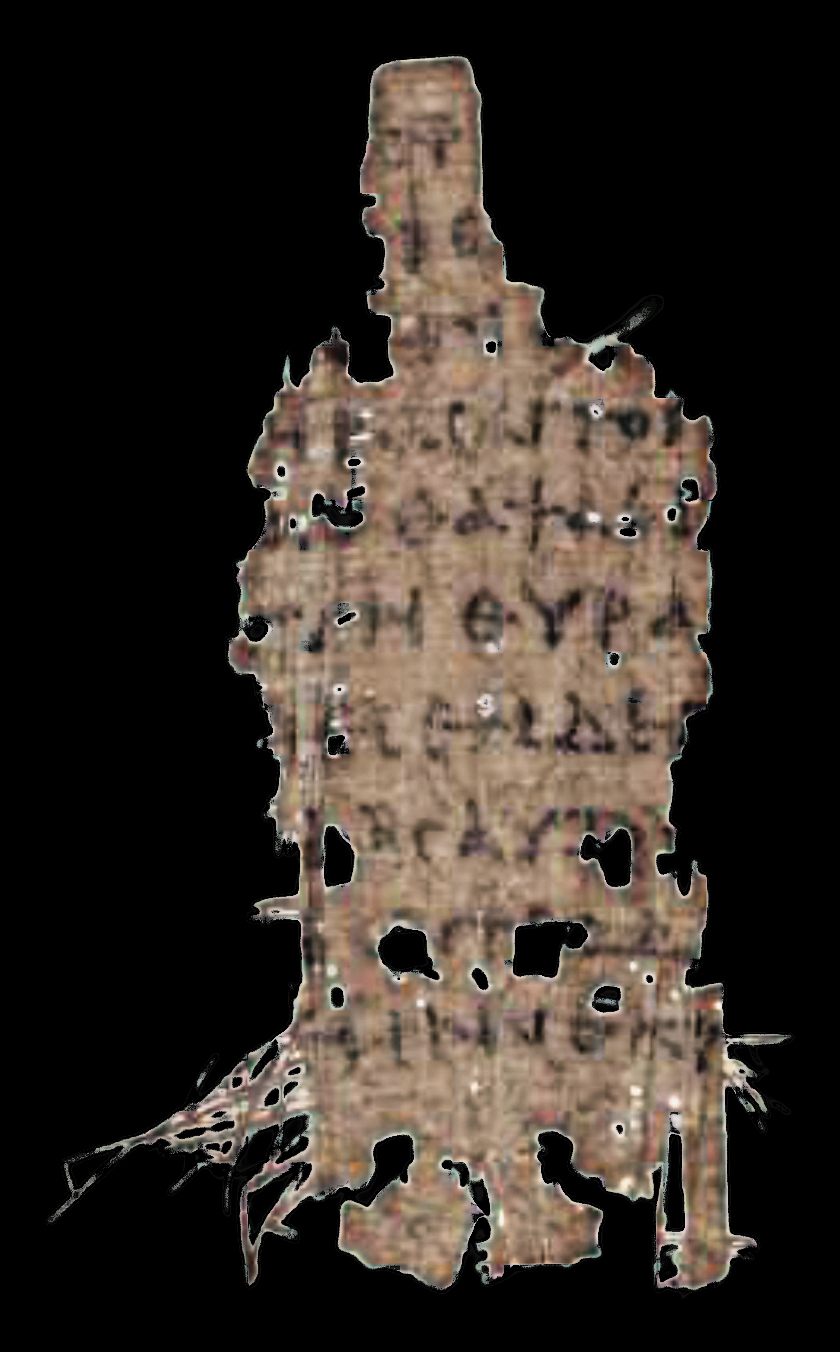
- Recto Acts 4:36-5:2
- Name: Papyrus Vindobonensis Graecus 26020
- Text: Acts 4-5 †
- Date: 4th / 5th century
- Script: Greek
- Found: Egypt
- Now at: Österreichische Nationalbibliothek
- Cite: P. Sanz, Mitteilungen aus der Papyrussammlung de österreichischen Nationalbibliothek in Wien, N.S., IV (Baden: 1946), pp. 66-67.
- Type: Alexandrian text-type
- Category: II

Papyrus 57 (in the Gregory-Aland numbering), designated by siglum 𝔓^{57}, is an early copy of the New Testament in Greek. It is a papyrus manuscript of the Acts of the Apostles, it contains only Acts 4:36–5:2.8–10.

The manuscript palaeographically has been assigned to the 4th century (or 5th century).

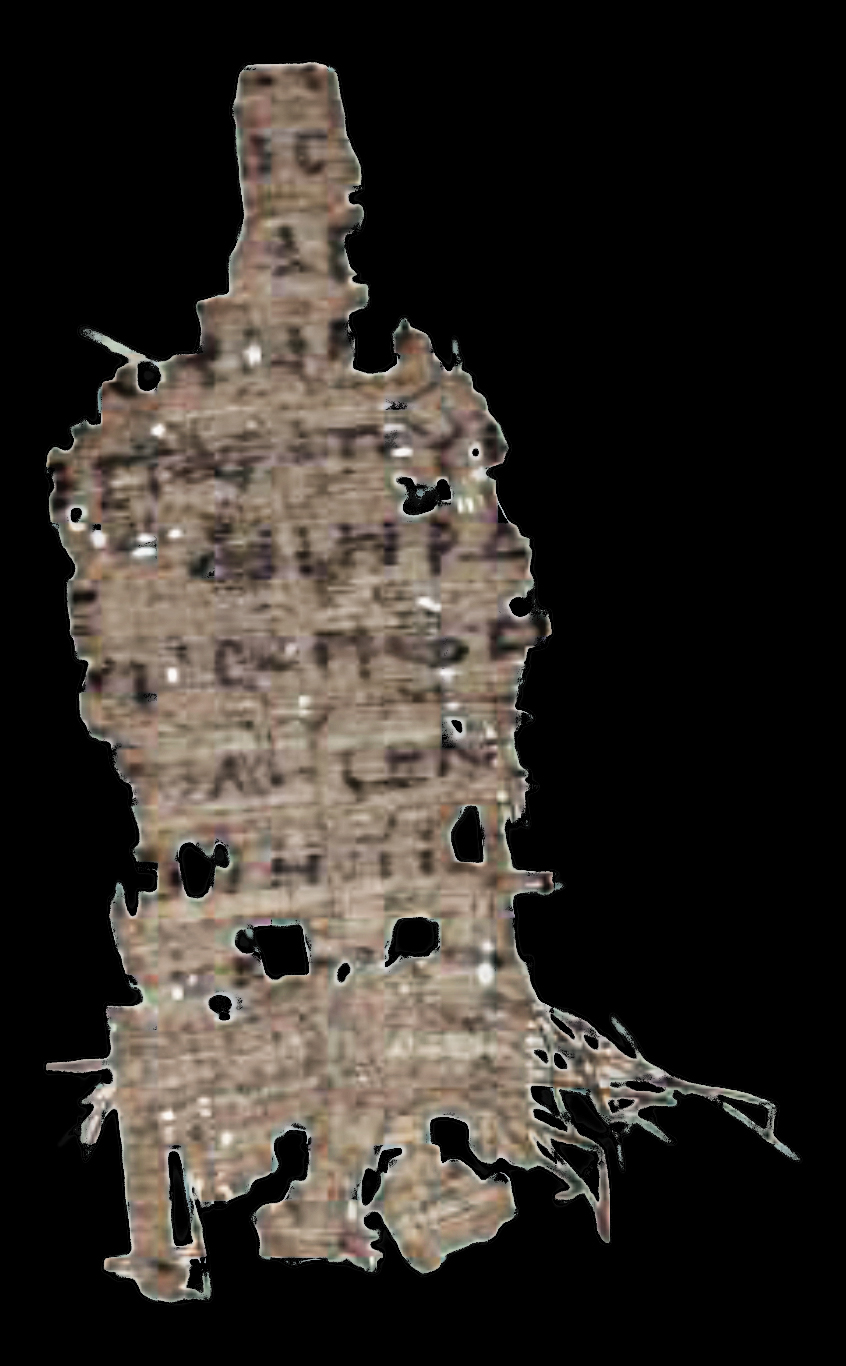
Verso Acts 5:8-10

The Greek text of this codex is a representative of the Alexandrian text-type. Aland placed it in Category II.

It was published by Peter Sanz.

It is currently housed at the Papyrus Collection of the Austrian National Library (Pap. Vindob. G. 26020) in Vienna.

== See also ==
- Acts 4; Acts 5
- List of New Testament papyri
