= P58 =

P58 may refer to:

- Feinwerkbau P58, an air pistol
- HMS Untamed (P58), a submarine of the Royal Navy
- INS Sumedha (P58), a patrol vessel of the Indian Navy
- Lockheed XP-58 Chain Lightning, an American prototype heavy fighter
- Papyrus 58, a biblical manuscript
- P58, a state regional road in Latvia
