= Papyrus 55 =

Papyrus 𝔓^{55}
- New Testament manuscript
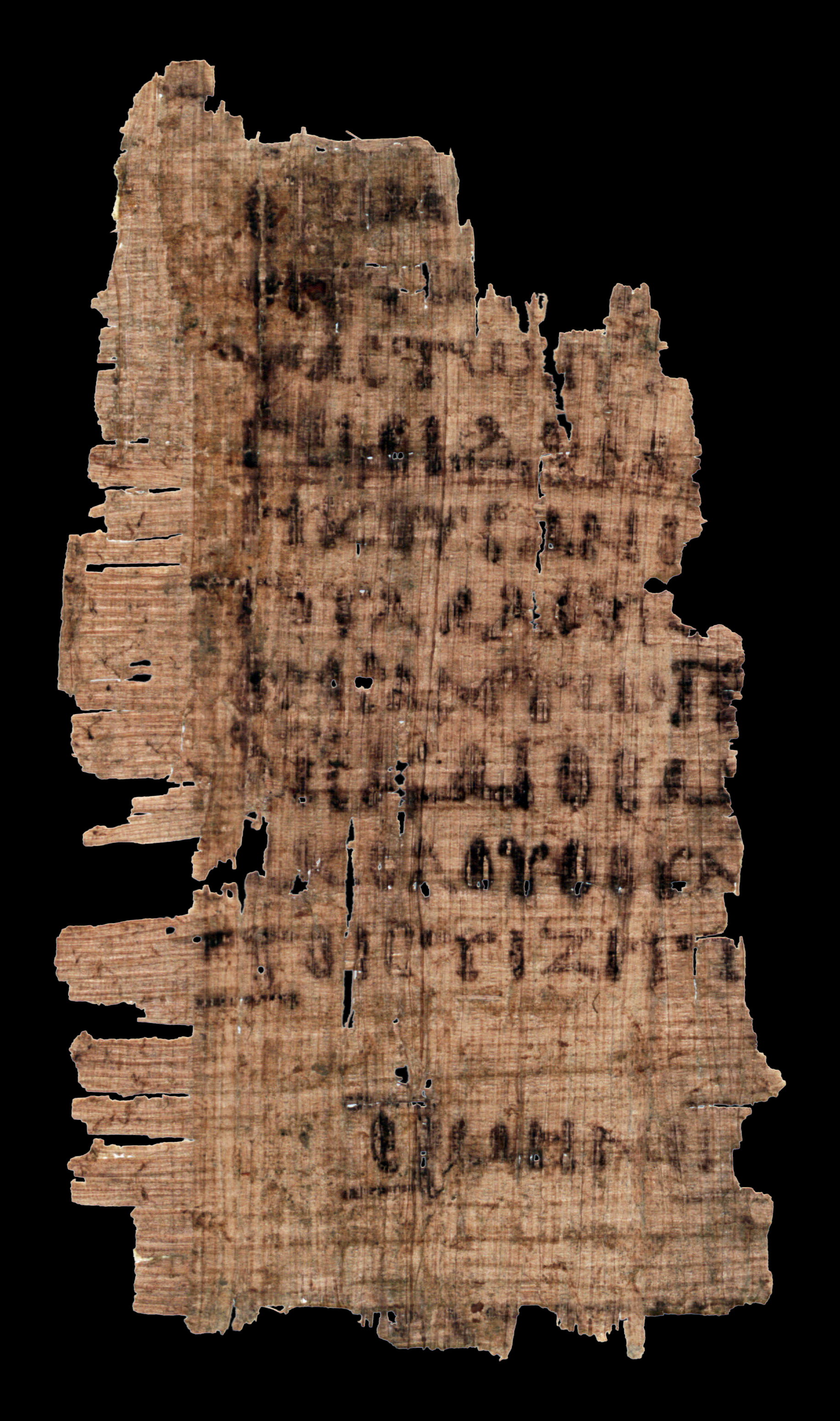
- Recto John 1:31-33
- Name: Pap. Vindobonensis Gr. 26214
- Text: John 1 †
- Date: 6th / 7th century
- Script: Greek
- Found: Egypt
- Now at: Österreichische Nationalbibliothek
- Cite: P. Sanz, Mitteilungen aus der Papyrussammlung der österreichischen Nationalbibliothek in Wien, N.S., IV (Baden: 1946), pp. 58-59.
- Type: Alexandrian text-type
- Category: II

Papyrus 55 (in the Gregory-Aland numbering), signed by 𝔓^{55}, is a copy of the New Testament in Greek. It is a papyrus manuscript of the Gospel of John. The surviving texts of John are verses 1:31-33, 35–38.

The manuscript paleographically has been assigned to the 6th century or the 7th century.

The Greek text of this codex is a representative of the Alexandrian text-type. Aland placed it in Category II.

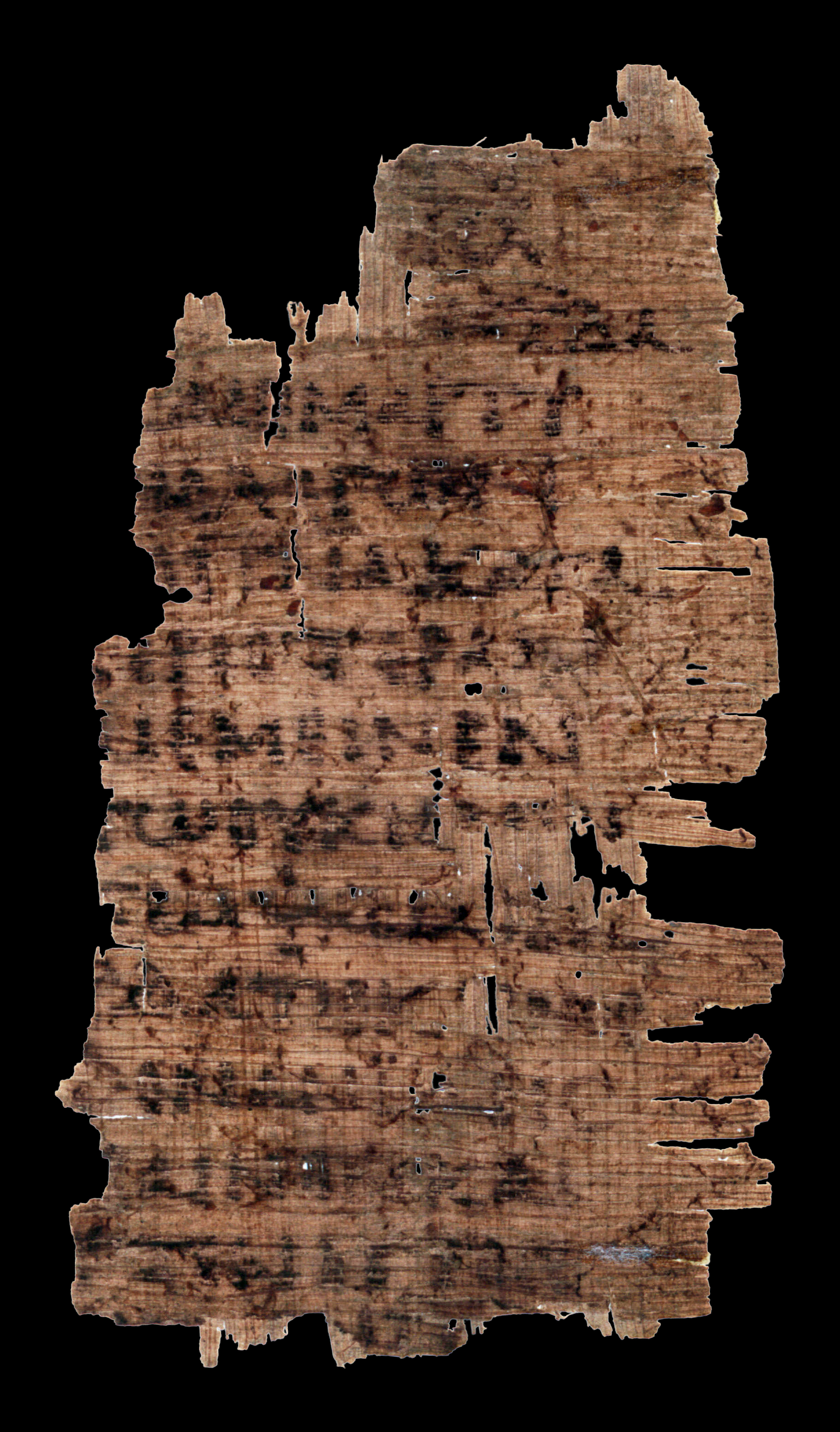
Verso John 1:35-38

It is currently housed at the Papyrus Collection of the Austrian National Library (Pap. Vindob. G. 26214) in Vienna.

== See also ==
- List of New Testament papyri
