= Uncial 0108 =

- New Testament manuscript
- Text: Gospel of Luke 11:37-45 †
- Date: 7th-century
- Script: Greek
- Found: Tischendorf
- Now at: Russian National Library
- Size: 30 x 24 cm
- Type: Alexandrian text-type
- Category: II

Uncial 0108 (in the Gregory-Aland numbering), ε 60 (Soden), is a Greek uncial manuscript of the New Testament, dated paleographically to the 7th-century. Formerly it was labelled by Θ^{d}.

== Description ==
The codex contains a small part of the Gospel of Luke 11:37-41.42-45, on one parchment leaves (30 cm by 24 cm). It is written in two columns per page, 23-24 lines per page, in uncial letters. Accents were added by a later hand.

The Greek text of this codex is a representative of the Alexandrian text-type. Aland placed it in Category II.

== History ==
C. R. Gregory dated the manuscript to the 7th or 8th-century. Currently it is dated by the INTF to the 7th century.

Constantin von Tischendorf brought the manuscript from the East in 1859, and edited its text in his Notitia.

It was described by Eduard de Muralt and Kurt Treu.

The codex currently is located at the Russian National Library (Gr. 22) in Saint Petersburg.

== See also ==
- List of New Testament uncials
- Textual criticism
