= Papyrus 34 =

Papyrus 𝔓^{34}
- New Testament manuscript
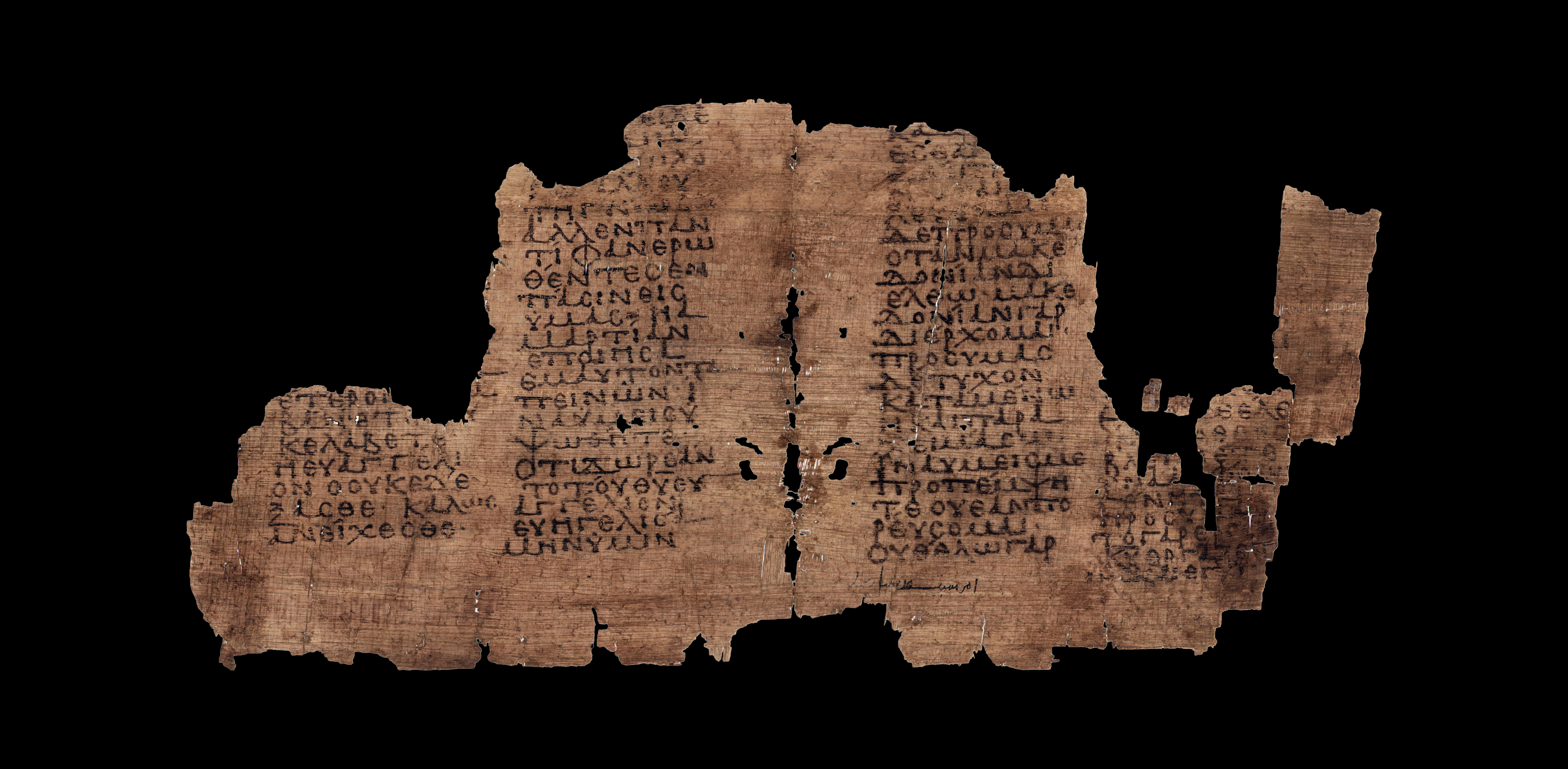
- Sheet recto 1 Cor 16, 4–7; 1 Cor 16, 9–10 + note; Cor 10, 13–14; 2 Cor 11, 2
- Name: P. Vindobonensis, gr. 39784
- Text: 1 Cor †; 2 Cor †
- Date: 7th century
- Script: Greek
- Found: Fayyum
- Now at: Österreichische Nationalbibliothek
- Cite: C. Wessely, Stud zur Pal und Pap XII, (Leipzig 1912), p. 246
- Type: Alexandrian text-type
- Category: II

Papyrus 34 (in the Gregory-Aland numbering), designated by 𝔓^{34}, is a copy of the New Testament in Greek. It is a papyrus manuscript of the Pauline epistles, it contains 1 Cor 16:4-7.10; 2 Cor 5:18-21; 10:13-14; 11:2.4.6-7. The manuscript paleographically has been assigned to the 7th century.

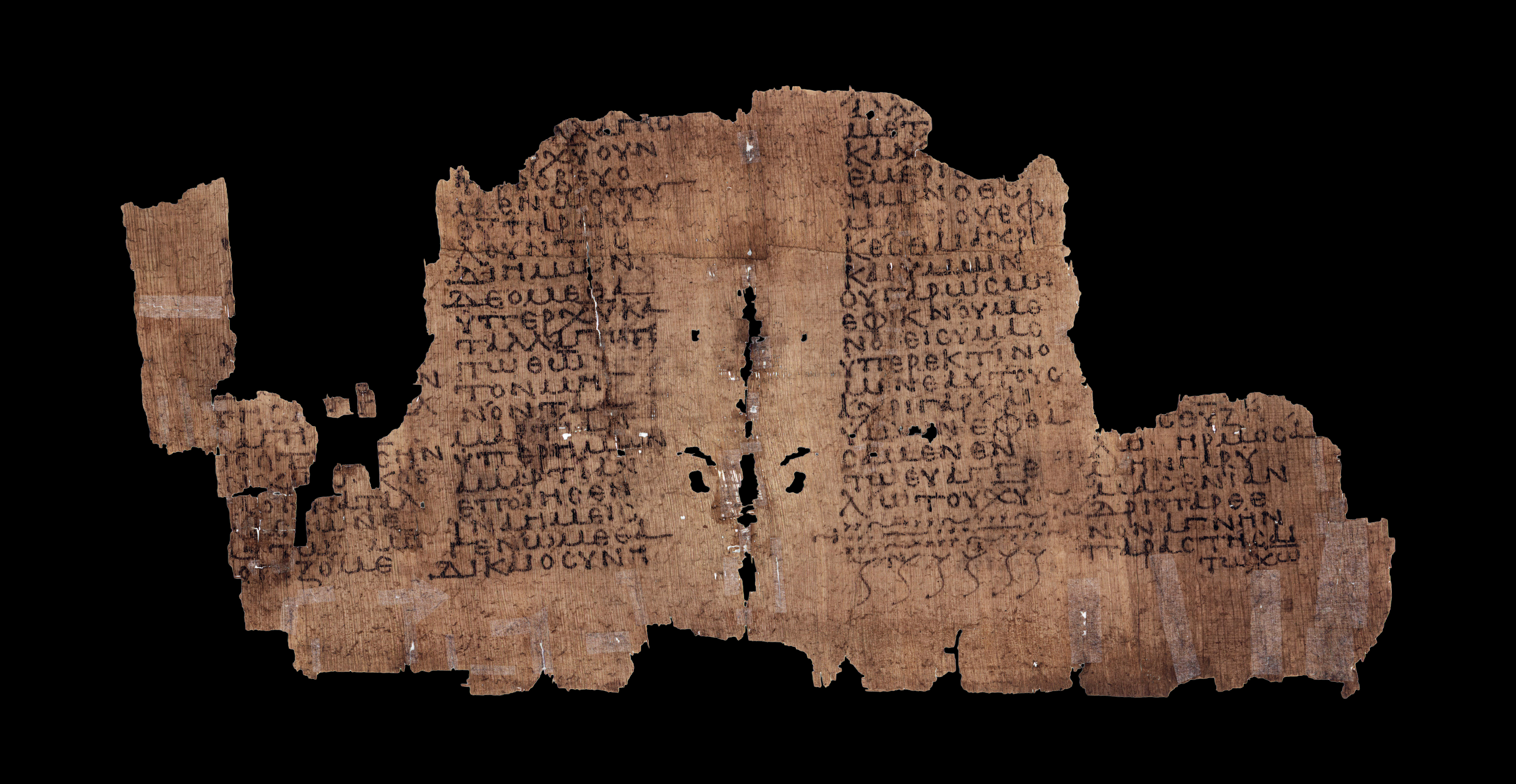
Sheet verso 2 Cor 5, 18–19; 2 Cor 5, 19–21; 2 Cor 11, 6–7; 1 Cor, 16, 7–10

The Greek text of this codex is a representative of the Alexandrian text-type. Aland placed it in Category II.

It is currently housed at the Österreichische Nationalbibliothek (P. Vindob. G. 39784) in Vienna.

== See also ==
- List of New Testament papyri
