= Uncial 0155 =

- New Testament manuscript
- Text: Luke 3:1-2,5,7-11; 6:24-31
- Date: 9th century
- Script: Greek
- Now at: Qubbat al-Khazna
- Size: 27 x 20 cm
- Type: Alexandrian text-type
- Category: II

Uncial 0155 (in the Gregory-Aland numbering), ε 1055 (von Soden), is a Greek uncial manuscript of the New Testament, dated palaeographically to the 9th century.

The codex contains two small parts of the Gospel of Luke 3:1-2,5,7-11; 6:24-31, on two parchment leaves (27 cm by 20 cm). It is written in two columns per page, 22 lines per page, in uncial letters.

The Greek text of this codex is a representative of the Alexandrian text-type. Aland placed it in Category II.

It is dated by the Institute for New Testament Textual Research to the 9th century.

The codex used to be held in Qubbat al-Khazna in Damascus (without catalogue number). The location of the codex is unknown. The manuscript is not accessible.

== See also ==
- List of New Testament uncials
- Textual criticism
