= Uncial 057 =

- New Testament manuscript
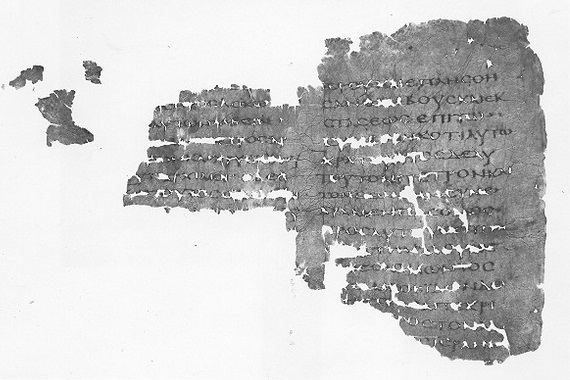
- Text: Acts
- Date: 4th/5th century
- Script: Greek
- Now at: Berlin State Museums
- Size: 9 cm x 13 cm
- Type: Alexandrian text-type
- Category: I

Uncial 057 (in the Gregory-Aland numbering), is a Greek uncial manuscript of the New Testament, dated palaeographically to the 4th or 5th century.

== Description ==
The codex contains a part of the Acts of Apostles (3:5-6,10-12), on a fragment of only one leaf (9 cm by 13 cm). The text is written in two columns per page, 27 lines per page. The letters are small, about 2 mm high. C. R. Gregory added it to the list of New Testament manuscripts in 1908.

The Greek text of this codex is a good representative of the Alexandrian text-type. Kurt Aland placed it in Category I.

Currently it is dated by the INTF to the 4th or 5th century.

The codex now is located at the Berlin State Museums (P. 9808), in Berlin.

== See also ==
- List of New Testament uncials
- Textual criticism
