= Uncial 0225 =

- New Testament manuscript
- Text: 2 Corinthians 5:1-2:,8-9,14-16,19-6:1,4-5; 8:16-24
- Date: 6th century
- Script: Greek
- Now at: Austrian National Library
- Size: 25 x 18 cm
- Type: Alexandrian text-type
- Category: II

Uncial 0225 (in the Gregory-Aland numbering), is a Greek uncial manuscript of the New Testament. The manuscript paleographically had been assigned to the 6th century. It contains a small parts of the Second Epistle to the Corinthians (5:1-2,8-9,14-16,19-6:1,3-5; 8:16-24), on 3 parchment leaves (25 cm by 18 cm). Written in two columns per page, 21-27 lines per page. It is a palimpsest. Some leaves were added (without erasing text). The upper text is in Pehlevi.

The Greek text of this codex is a representative of the Alexandrian text-type. Aland placed it in Category II.

Currently it is dated by the INTF to the 6th century.

The manuscript was added to the list of the New Testament manuscripts by Kurt Aland in 1953.

The codex currently is housed at the Austrian National Library, in Vienna, with the shelf number Pap. G. 19802.

== See also ==
- List of New Testament uncials
- Textual criticism
