= Uncial 0247 =

- New Testament manuscript
- Text: 1 Peter 5:13-14 - 2 Peter 1:5-8,14-16; 2:1
- Date: 5th / 6th century
- Script: Greek
- Now at: John Rylands Library
- Size: 29 cm by 23 cm
- Type: Alexandrian text-type
- Category: II

Uncial 0247 (in the Gregory-Aland numbering), is a Greek uncial manuscript of the New Testament. Paleographically it has been assigned to the 5th or 6th century.

== Description ==
The codex contains a small part of the 1 Peter 5:13-14 - 2 Peter 1:5-8,14-16; 2:1, on 2 parchment leaves (29 cm by 23 cm). Written in two columns per page, 36 lines per page, in uncial letters.

It is a palimpsest, the upper text was written in Coptic, it contains a prayer.

Currently it is dated by the INTF to the 5th or 6th century.

== Location ==
Currently the codex is housed at the John Rylands Library (P. Copt. 20) in Manchester.

== Text ==
The Greek text of this codex is a representative of the Alexandrian text-type. Aland placed it in Category II.

== See also ==
- List of New Testament uncials
- Textual criticism
