= Uncial 0204 =

- New Testament manuscript
- Text: Matthew 24:39-42,44-48
- Date: 7th century
- Script: Greek-Coptic
- Now at: British Library
- Size: 25 x 21 cm
- Type: Alexandrian text-type
- Category: II

Uncial 0204 (in the Gregory-Aland numbering), is a Greek-Coptic diglot uncial manuscript of the New Testament, dated paleographically to the 7th century.

== Description ==
The codex contains a small parts of the Gospel of Matthew 24:39-42,44-48 (Coptic 24:30-33,35-37), on one parchment leaf (25 cm by 21 cm). It is written in two columns per page, 26 lines per page, in very large uncial letters. The Coptic part is written in Fayumic dialect.

The Greek text of this codex is a representative of the Alexandrian text-type. Aland placed it in Category II.

Currently it is dated by the INTF to the 7th century.

The Coptic text was examined by Walter Ewing Crum in 1905 (as P. Lond. Copt. 500). The manuscript was added to the list of the New Testament manuscripts by Ernst von Dobschütz in 1933.

The codex currently is housed at the British Library (Gr. 4923 (2)) in London.

== See also ==
- List of New Testament uncials
- Coptic versions of the Bible
- Textual criticism
