= Uncial 0175 =

- New Testament manuscript
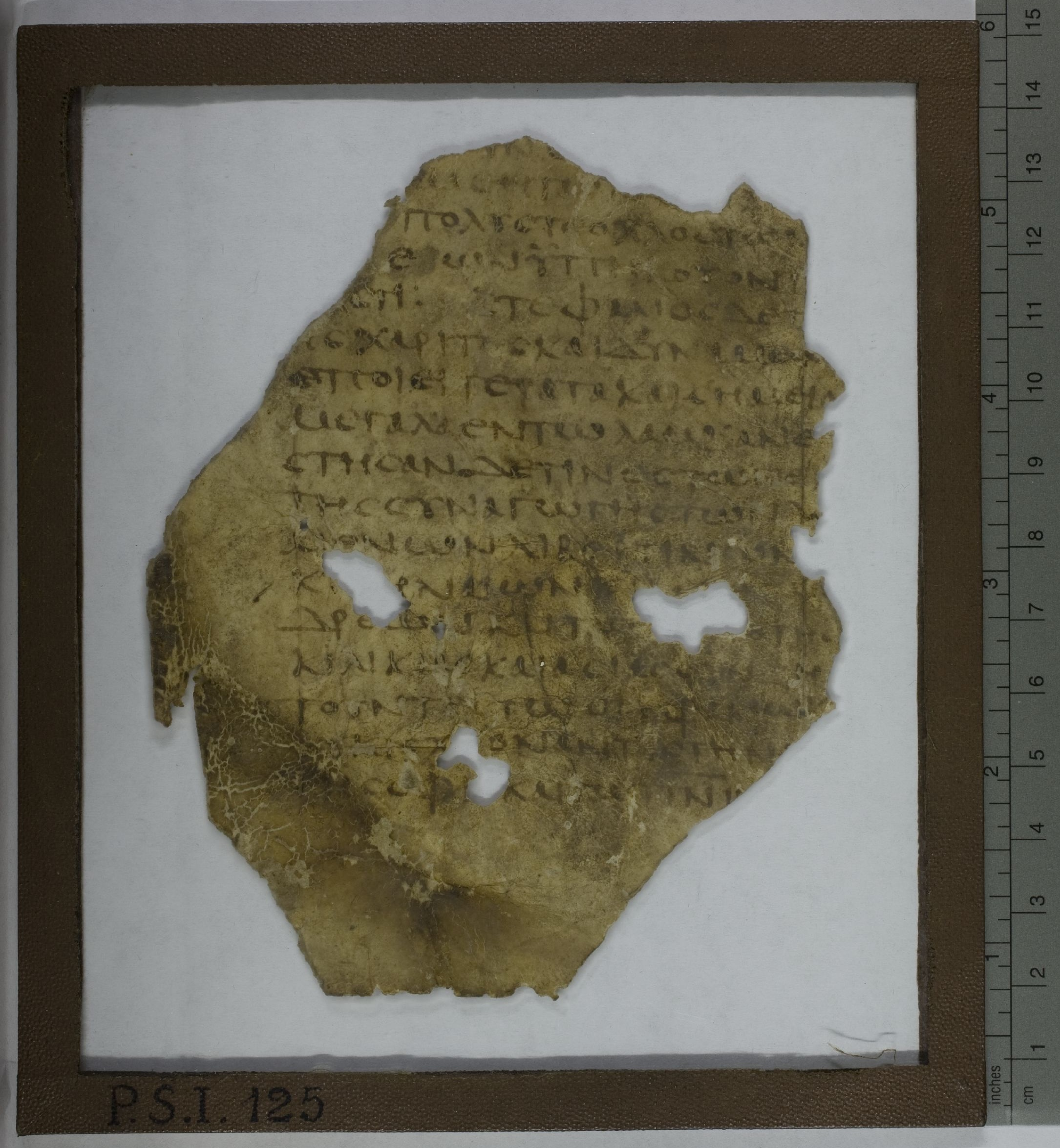
- Folio verso
- Text: Acts 6:7–15
- Date: 5th century
- Script: Greek
- Now at: Laurentian Library
- Size: 17 x 12 cm
- Type: Alexandrian text-type
- Category: II

Uncial 0175 (in the Gregory-Aland numbering), is a Greek uncial manuscript of the New Testament, dated palaeographically to the 5th century The manuscript has survived in a very fragmentary condition.

== Description ==
The codex contains a small part of the Acts of the Apostles 6:7–15, on one parchment leaf (17 cm by 12 cm). The text is written in one column per page, 20 lines per page, in uncial letters.

The Greek text of this codex is a representative of the Alexandrian text-type. Aland placed it in Category II.

Currently it is dated by the INTF to the 5th century.

The codex currently is housed at the Laurentian Library (PSI 125) in Florence.

== See also ==
- List of New Testament uncials
- Textual criticism
