= Uncial 0172 =

- New Testament manuscript
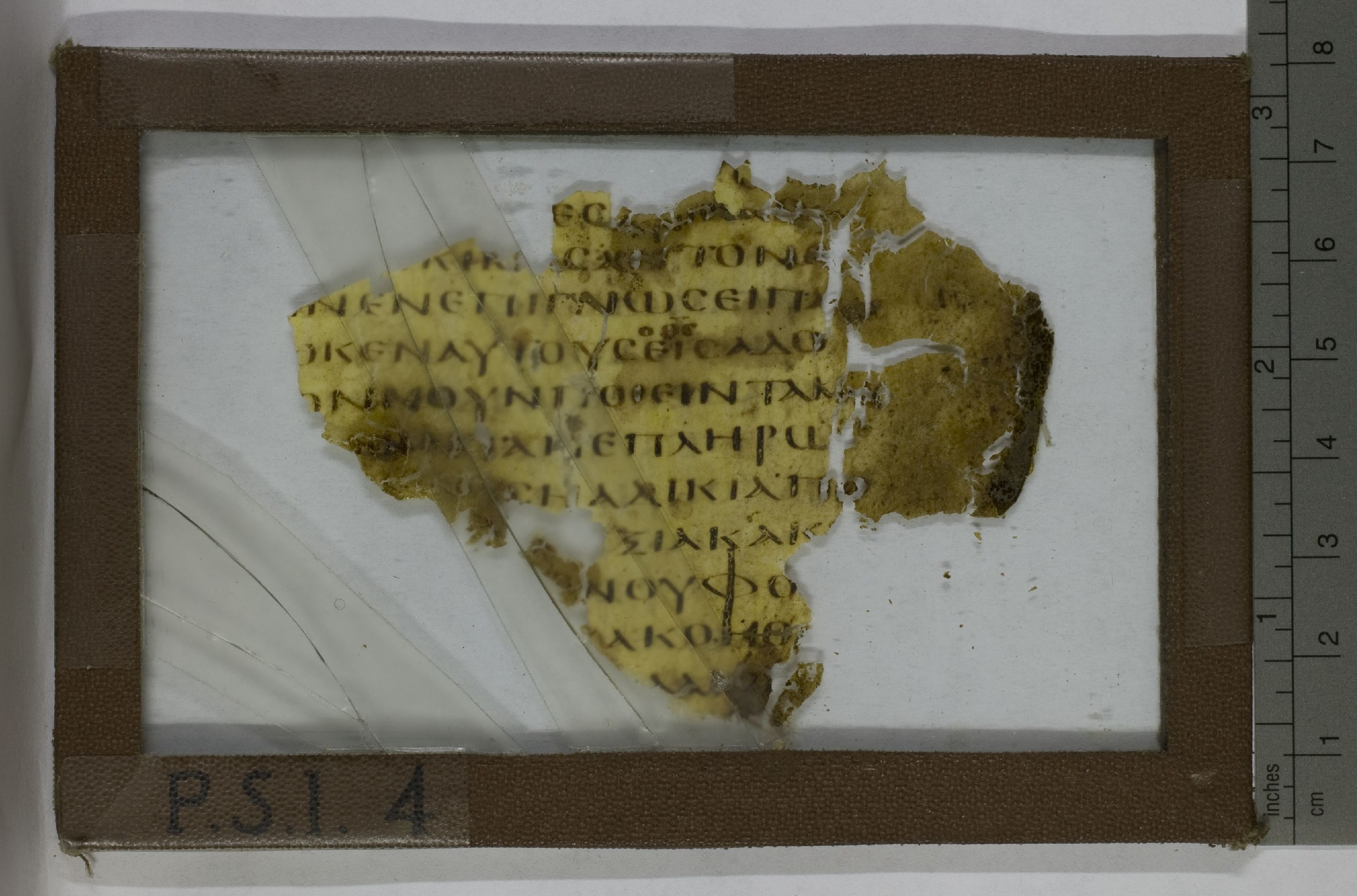
- Text: Romans 1:27-30,32-2:2
- Date: 5th century
- Script: Greek
- Now at: Laurentian Library
- Size: 14 x 11 cm
- Type: Alexandrian text-type
- Category: II

Uncial 0172 (in the Gregory-Aland numbering), is a Greek uncial manuscript of the New Testament, dated palaeographically to the 5th century.

== Description ==
The codex contains a small parts of the Epistle to the Romans 1:27-30,32-2:2, on one parchment leaf (14 cm by 11 cm). The text is written in one column per page, 19 lines per page, in uncial letters.

The Greek text of this codex is a representative of the Alexandrian text-type. Aland placed it in Category II.

Currently it is dated by the INTF to the 5th century.

Facsimile of this fragment was published by M. Naldini ad Guglielmo Cavallo.

The codex currently is housed at the Laurentian Library (PSI 4) in Florence.

== See also ==
- List of New Testament uncials
- Textual criticism
- Biblical manuscript
