= Uncial 0240 =

- New Testament manuscript
- Text: Titus 1:4-8
- Date: 5th century
- Script: Greek
- Now at: Georgian National Center of Manuscripts
- Size: 26 x 22 cm
- Type: Alexandrian text-type
- Category: II

Uncial 0240 (in the Gregory-Aland numbering), is a Greek uncial manuscript of the New Testament. Palaeographically it has been assigned to the 5th century.

== Description ==
The codex contains a small part of the Epistle to Titus 1:4-8, on one parchment leaf (26 cm by 22 cm). The text is written in two columns per page, 23 lines per page, in uncial letters.

It is a palimpsest. The upper text is written in Georgian, it contains a menologion.

Currently it is dated by the INTF to the 5th century.

The manuscript was added to the list of the New Testament manuscripts by Kurt Aland in 1956.

It was examined by Pasquale Orsini.

== Text ==
The Greek text of this codex is a representative of the Alexandrian text-type. Aland placed it in Category II.

== Location ==
Currently the codex is housed at the Georgian National Center of Manuscripts (2123, ff. 191, 198) in Tbilisi.

== See also ==
- List of New Testament uncials
- Textual criticism
