= Uncial 076 =

- New Testament manuscript
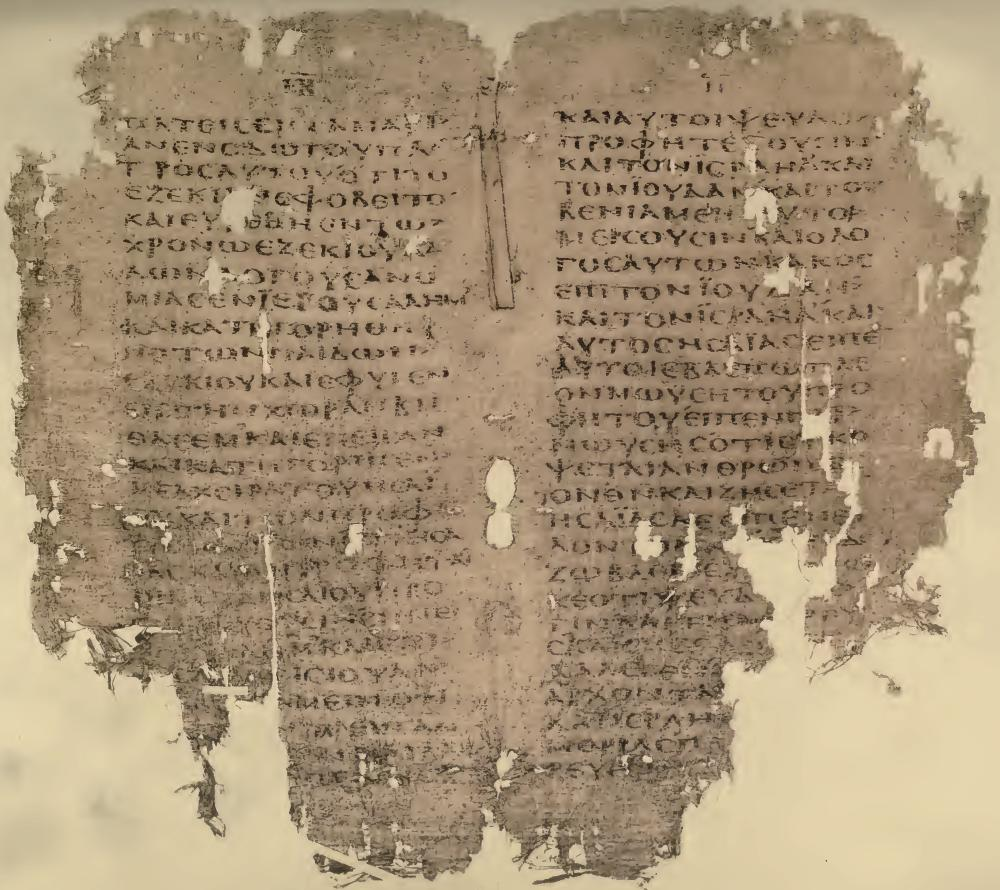
- Text: Acts 2:11-22
- Date: 5th /6th-century
- Script: Greek
- Now at: Pierpont Morgan Library
- Size: 17 x 15 cm
- Type: Alexandrian text-type
- Category: II

Uncial 076 (in the Gregory-Aland numbering), α^{1008} (Soden), is a Greek uncial manuscript of the New Testament, dated palaeographically to the 5th or 6th-century. Formerly it was labeled by י^{a}.

== Description ==
Survived only one parchment leaf (17 cm by 15 cm). The codex is written in two columns per page, 23 lines per page, 9-10 letters per line. It contains a part of the Acts of the Apostles (2:11-22) with some missing words or letters. It used breathings and accents. The nomina sacra are abbreviated. The Old Testament quotations are marked by inverted comma (>).

== Text ==
The Greek text of this codex is a representative of the Alexandrian text-type with some alien readings. Kurt Aland placed it in Category II. The most interesting readings occurs in 2:13 where fragment supports Codex Bezae against all other manuscripts.

θ̅υ̅ εξισταν

το δε παντες
και διηπορου
το αλλος προς
τον αλλον λε
γοντες τι θε
[λει] τουτο ει
[ναι ε]τεροι
δ[ε εχ]λευαζο
λε[γο]ντες ο
τι [γλευκους
με[μεστω]με
νοι ε[ι]σιν [
[σ]ταθεις δε ο
πετρος συν
τοις ενδεκα
επηρεν τη
γωνην [α]υτου
και απεφθεγ
ξατο α[υ]τοις [
ανδρε[ς] ιου
δαιο[ι κ]αι οι
κατοικουν

τες [ι]λημ παν
τες του[το
γνωστ[ον υμι
εστω [και ενω
τις[ασθε τα
ρη[ματα μου
ο[υ γαρ ως υ
μ[εις υπολα]μ
βαν[ετε ου]τ[οι
μεθυ[ουσι]ν
εστι[ν γαρ] ωρα
τριτ[η τη]ς η
μερα[ς αλλα
τουτ[ο ε]στι
το [ειρημε]υο
δια του [π]ρο
φητου [ι]ωηλ
και εστα[ι] με
τα ταυτα λεγει
ο θ̅ς̅ εκχεω
απο του πνς
μου επι
πασα[ν σαρκα

== History ==
Currently it is dated by the INTF to the 5th or 6th century.

The manuscript once belonged to Lord Amherst in Norfolk. In 1908/1909 Lord Amherst sold his library.

The codex is located now in the Pierpont Morgan Library (Pap. G. 8) at New York City.

== See also ==
- List of New Testament uncials
- Biblical manuscript
- Textual criticism
