= Uncial 0111 =

- New Testament manuscript
- Text: 2 Thess 1:1-2:2
- Date: 7th-century
- Script: Greek
- Now at: Berlin State Museums
- Size: 16 x 14 cm
- Type: Alexandrian text-type
- Category: II

Uncial 0111 (in the Gregory-Aland numbering), is a Greek uncial manuscript of the New Testament, dated paleographically to the 7th-century.

== Description ==
The codex contains a small part of the 2 Thess 1:1-2:2, on only one parchment leaf (16 by 14 cm (6.3 by 5.5 in)). The text is written in two columns per page, 24 lines per page, 12–14 letters per line, in small uncial letters. It has not accents. It has itacism errors; parchment is very thin. The leaf has survived in a fragmentary condition.

The Greek text of this codex is a representative of the Alexandrian text-type. Aland placed it in Category II, it means it contains some alien readings.

Currently it is dated by the INTF to the 7th-century.

The codex now is located in the Berlin State Museums (P. 5013) in Berlin.

== See also ==
- List of New Testament uncials
- Textual criticism
