= Uncial 0234 =

Greek manuscript of the New Testament

- New Testament manuscript
- Text: Matthew 28:11-15; John 1:4-8,20-24
- Date: 8th century
- Script: Greek
- Now at: Qubbat al-Khazna
- Size: 24 x 21 cm
- Type: Alexandrian text-type
- Category: II
- Note: western order of the Gospels

Uncial 0234 (in the Gregory-Aland numbering), ε 49 (von Soden), is a Greek uncial manuscript of the New Testament. Paleographically it has been assigned to the 8th century.

== Description ==
The codex contains two small parts of the Matthew 28:11-15; John 1:4-8,20-24, on two parchment leaves (24 cm by 21 cm). Written in two columns per page, 30 lines per page, in uncial letters.

Gospel of John follows Matthew immediately (western order).

Currently it is dated by the INTF to the 8th century.

Formerly the codex was held at the Qubbat al-Khazna in Damascus. The present location of the codex is unknown. Currently the manuscript is not accessible.

The manuscript was added to the list of the New Testament manuscripts by Kurt Aland in 1954.

== Text ==
The Greek text of this codex is a representative of the Alexandrian text-type. Aland placed it in Category II.

== See also ==
- List of New Testament uncials
- Textual criticism
