= Uncial 0245 =

- New Testament manuscript
- Text: 1 John 3-4
- Date: 6th century
- Script: Greek
- Now at: University of Birmingham
- Size: 27 cm by 20 cm
- Type: Alexandrian text-type
- Category: II

Uncial 0245 (in the Gregory-Aland numbering), is a Greek uncial manuscript of the New Testament. Paleographically it has been assigned to the 6th century.

== Description ==
The codex contains a small part of the 1 John 3:23-4:1,3-6, on 1 parchment leaf (27 cm by 20 cm). Written in one columns per page, 23 lines per page, in uncial letters.

Currently it is dated by the INTF to the 6th century.

It is a palimpsest, the upper text is written in Georgian language.

== Location ==
Currently the codex is housed at the Cadbury Research Library, University of Birmingham (Mingana Georg. 7).

== Text ==
The Greek text of this codex is a representative of the Alexandrian text-type. Aland placed it in Category II.

== See also ==
- List of New Testament uncials
- Textual criticism
