= Alexandrian text-type =

New Testament text type

In textual criticism of the New Testament, the Alexandrian text-type is one of the main text types. It is the text type favored by the majority of modern textual critics and it is the basis for most modern (after 1900) Bible translations. Over 5,800 New Testament manuscripts have been classified into four groups by text type. Besides the Alexandrian, the other types are the Western, Caesarean, and Byzantine. Compared to these later text types, Alexandrian readings tend to be abrupt, use fewer words, show greater variation among the Synoptic Gospels, and have readings that are considered difficult. That is to say, later scribes tended to polish scripture and improve its literary style. Glosses would occasionally be added as verses during the process of copying a Bible by hand. From the ninth century onward, most surviving manuscripts are of the Byzantine type.

The King James Version and other Reformation-era Bibles are translated from the Textus Receptus, a Greek text created by Erasmus and based on various manuscripts of the Byzantine type. In 1721, Richard Bentley outlined a project to create a revised Greek text based on the Codex Alexandrinus. This project was completed by Karl Lachmann in 1850. Brooke Foss Westcott and F. J. A. Hort of Cambridge published a text based on Codex Vaticanus and Codex Sinaiticus in 1881. Novum Testamentum Graece by Eberhard Nestle and Kurt Aland, now in its 28th edition, generally follows the text of Westcott and Hort.

== Manuscripts ==
Up until the ninth century, Greek texts were written entirely in uppercase letters, referred to as uncials. During the ninth and tenth centuries, minuscules came to replace the older style. Most Greek uncial manuscripts were recopied in this period and their parchment leaves typically scraped clean for re-use. Consequently, surviving Greek New Testament manuscripts from before the ninth century are relatively rare, but nine (over half of the total that survive) witness a more-or-less pure Alexandrian text. These include the oldest near-complete manuscripts of the New Testament: Codex Vaticanus Graecus 1209 and Codex Sinaiticus (both believed to date from the early fourth century).

A number of substantial papyrus manuscripts of portions of the New Testament survive from earlier still, and those that can be ascribed a text-type, such as 𝔓^{66} and 𝔓^{75} from the second to the third century, also tend to witness to the Alexandrian text.

The earliest Coptic versions of the Bible (into a Sahidic variety of the late second century) use the Alexandrian text as a Greek base, while other second and third century translations (into Latin and Syriac) tend rather to conform to the Western text-type. Although the overwhelming majority of later minuscule manuscripts conform to the Byzantine text-type, detailed study has, from time to time, identified individual minuscules that transmit the alternative Alexandrian text. Around 17 such manuscripts have been discovered so far and so the Alexandrian text-type is witnessed by around 30 surviving manuscripts, by no means all of which are associated with Egypt although in that area, Alexandrian witnesses are the most prevalent.

According to Robert Boyd, the Arabic manuscripts of the New Testament appear to have an origin within the Alexandrian text-type.

The Alexandrian text-type is witnessed to in the writings of Origen (185 – c. 253), Athanasius (296–298 – 373), Didymus (313 – 398) and Cyril of Alexandria (376 – 444). The quotations of Clement of Alexandria also often agree with the Alexandrian text-type, although sometimes they contain readings which are instead common in the Byzantine text-type.

=== List of notable manuscripts representing Alexandrian text-type ===
Sign	Name	Date	Content	Discovery
𝔓^{45}	Chester Beatty I	3rd	fragments of Gospels, Acts	1931
𝔓^{46}	Chester Beatty II	c. 200	Pauline epistles	1931
𝔓^{47}	Chester Beatty III	3rd	fragments of Revelation	1931
𝔓^{66}	Bodmer II	c. 200	Gospel of John	1952
𝔓^{72}	Bodmer VII/VIII	3rd/4th	Jude; 1-2 Peter	1952
𝔓^{75}	Bodmer XIV-XV	3rd	Gospels of Luke and John	1952
א	Codex Sinaiticus	330–360	NT	1844
B	Codex Vaticanus	325–350	Matt. — Hbr 9, 14	16th century?
A	Codex Alexandrinus	c. 400	(except Gospels)	17th century
C	Codex Ephraemi Rescriptus	5th	(except Gospels)	17th century?
Q	Codex Guelferbytanus B	5th	fragments Luke — John	18th century
T	Codex Borgianus	5th	fragments Luke — John	18th century
I	Codex Freerianus	5th	Pauline epistles	1906
Z	Codex Dublinensis	6th	fragments of Matt.	1787
L	Codex Regius	8th	Gospels	18th century?
W	Codex Washingtonianus	5th	Luke 1:1–8:12; J 5:12–21:25	1906
057	Uncial 057	4/5th	Acts 3:5–6,10-12	20th century?
0220	Uncial 0220	6th	NT (except Rev.)	1950
33	Minuscule 33	9th	Romans	18th century?
81	Minuscule 81	1044	Acts, Paul	1853
892	Minuscule 892	9th	Gospels	1877

=== Other manuscripts ===
Papyri: 𝔓^{1}, 𝔓^{4}, 𝔓^{5}, 𝔓^{6}, 𝔓^{8}, 𝔓^{9}, 𝔓^{10}, 𝔓^{11}, 𝔓^{12}, 𝔓^{13}, 𝔓^{14}, 𝔓^{15}, 𝔓^{16}, 𝔓^{17}, 𝔓^{18}, 𝔓^{19}, 𝔓^{20}, 𝔓^{22}, 𝔓^{23}, 𝔓^{24}, 𝔓^{26}, 𝔓^{27}, 𝔓^{28}, 𝔓^{29}, 𝔓^{30}, 𝔓^{31}, 𝔓^{32}, 𝔓^{33}, 𝔓^{34}, 𝔓^{35}, 𝔓^{37}, 𝔓^{39}, 𝔓^{40}, 𝔓^{43}, 𝔓^{44}, 𝔓^{49}, 𝔓^{51}, 𝔓^{53}, 𝔓^{55}, 𝔓^{56}, 𝔓^{57}, 𝔓^{61}, 𝔓^{62}, 𝔓^{63}, 𝔓^{64}, 𝔓^{65}, 𝔓^{70}, 𝔓^{71}, 𝔓^{74}, 𝔓^{77}, 𝔓^{78}, 𝔓^{79}, 𝔓^{80} (?), 𝔓^{81}, 𝔓^{82}, 𝔓^{85} (?), 𝔓^{86}, 𝔓^{87}, 𝔓^{90}, 𝔓^{91}, 𝔓^{92}, 𝔓^{95}, 𝔓^{100}, 𝔓^{104}, 𝔓^{106}, 𝔓^{107}, 𝔓^{108}, 𝔓^{110}, 𝔓^{111}, 𝔓^{115}, 𝔓^{122}.

Uncials: Codex Coislinianus, Porphyrianus (except Acts, Rev), Dublinensis, Sangallensis (only in Mark), Zacynthius, Athous Lavrensis (in Mark and Cath. epistles), Vaticanus 2061, 059, 068, 070, 071, 073, 076, 077, 081, 083, 085, 087, 088, 089, 091, 093 (except Acts), 094, 096, 098, 0101, 0102, 0108, 0111, 0114, 0129, 0142, 0155, 0156, 0162, 0167, 0172, 0173, 0175, 0181, 0183, 0184, 0185, 0189, 0201, 0204, 0205, 0207, 0223, 0225, 0232, 0234, 0240, 0243, 0244, 0245, 0247, 0254, 0270, 0271, 0274.

Minuscules: 20, 94, 104 (Epistles), 157, 164, 215, 241, 254, 256 (Paul), 322, 323, 326, 376, 383, 442, 579 (except Matthew), 614, 718, 850, 1006, 1175, 1241 (except Acts), 1243, 1292 (Cath.), 1342 (Mark), 1506 (Paul), 1611, 1739, 1841, 1852, 1908, 2040, 2053, 2062, 2298, 2344 (CE, Rev), 2351, 2427, 2464.

According to the present critics codices 𝔓^{75} and B are the best Alexandrian witnesses, which present the pure Alexandrian text. All other witnesses are classified according to whether they preserve the excellent 𝔓^{75}-B line of text. With the primary Alexandrian witnesses are included 𝔓^{66} and citations of Origen. With the secondary witnesses are included manuscripts C, L, 33, and the writings of Didymus the Blind.

== Characteristics ==
All extant manuscripts of all text-types are at least 85% identical and most of the variations are not translatable into English, such as word order or spelling. When compared to witnesses of the Western text-type, Alexandrian readings tend to be shorter and are commonly regarded as having a lower tendency to expand or paraphrase. Some of the manuscripts representing the Alexandrian text-type have the Byzantine corrections made by later hands (Papyrus 66, Codex Sinaiticus, Codex Ephraemi, Codex Regius, and Codex Sangallensis). When compared to witnesses of the Byzantine text type, Alexandrian manuscripts tend:

- to have a larger number of abrupt readings, such as the shorter ending of the Gospel of Mark, which finishes in the Alexandrian text at Mark 16:8 ("... for they were afraid.") omitting verses Mark 16:9-20; Matthew 16:2b–3, John 5:4; John 7:53-8:11;
- Omitted verses: Matt 12:47; 17:21; 18:11; Mark 9:44.46; 11:26; 15:28; Luke 17:36; Acts 8:37; 15:34; 24:7; 28:29.
- In Matthew 15:6 omitted η την μητερα (αυτου) (or (his) mother): א B D cop^{sa};
- In Mark 10:7 omitted phrase και προσκολληθησεται προς την γυναικα αυτου (and be joined to his wife), in codices Sinaiticus, Vaticanus, Athous Lavrensis, 892, ℓ 48, syr^{s}, goth.
- Mark 10:37 αριστερων (left) instead of ευωνυμων (left), in phrase εξ αριστερων (B Δ 892^{v.l.}) or σου εξ αριστερων (L Ψ 892*);
- In Luke 11:4 phrase αλλα ρυσαι ημας απο του πονηρου (but deliver us from evil) omitted. Omission is supported by the manuscripts: Sinaiticus, B, L, f^{1}, 700, vg, syr^{s}, cop^{sa, bo}, arm, geo.
- In Luke 9:55-56 it has only στραφεις δε επετιμησεν αυτοις (but He turned and rebuked them): 𝔓^{45} 𝔓^{75} א B C L W X Δ Ξ Ψ 28 33 565 892 1009 1010 1071 Byz^{pt} Lect
- to display more variations between parallel synoptic passages, as in the Lukan version of the Lord's Prayer (Luke 11:2), which in the Alexandrian text opens "Father... ", whereas the Byzantine text reads (as in the parallel Matthew 6:9) "Our Father in heaven... ";
- to have a higher proportion of "difficult" readings, as in Matthew 24:36, which reads in the Alexandrian text "But of that day and hour no one knows, not even the angels of heaven, nor the Son, but the Father only"; whereas the Byzantine text omits the phrase "nor the Son", thereby avoiding the implication that Jesus lacked full divine foreknowledge. Another difficult reading is Luke 4:44.

The above comparisons are tendencies, rather than consistent differences. There are a number of passages in the Gospel of Luke in which the Western text-type witnesses a shorter text, the Western non-interpolations. Also, there are a number of readings where the Byzantine text displays variation between synoptic passages, that is not found in either the Western or Alexandrian texts, as in the rendering into Greek of the Aramaic last words of Jesus, which are reported in the Byzantine text as "Eloi, Eloi..." in Mark 15:34, but as "Eli, Eli..." in Matthew 27:46.

== See also ==
- Categories of New Testament manuscripts
- Comparison of codices Sinaiticus and Vaticanus
