= Uncial 0205 =

Sahidic Uncial Manuscript

- New Testament manuscript
- Text: Epistle to Titus †
- Date: 8th-century
- Script: Greek, Coptic diglot
- Now at: Cambridge University Library
- Size: 32 x 22.5 cm
- Type: Alexandrian text-type
- Category: II

Codex 0205 (in the Gregory-Aland numbering). It is a diglot Greek-Coptic (Sahidic) uncial manuscript of the Epistle to Titus and the Epistle to Philemon, dated paleographically to the 8th century (J. M. Plumley proposed 7th or 6th-century).

== Description ==
The uncial 0205 was possibly a complete codex of the Pauline epistles, of which only 2 leaves survived (32 cm by 22.5 cm). Each page contains two parallel columns with 35 lines, and 12-13 letters per line. The codex is written in Greek and Coptic, but it is not a genuine diglot manuscript. On the first page, the first column and the first seven lines of the second column contains Titus 2:15b-3:7 in Greek. At this point the Coptic text begins with Titus 2:11 and continues to the end of Philemon. The Greek represents only 15% of the text of the manuscript.

The Greek text of this codex is a representative of the Alexandrian text-type. Aland placed it in Category II.

Currently it is dated by the INTF to the 8th century. It was found in White Monastery.

The manuscript was added to the list of the New Testament manuscripts by Ernst von Dobschütz in 1933.

J. K. Elliott from University of Leeds published description of its text and facsimile.

The codex is located in the Cambridge University Library (Or. 1699 II x).

== See also ==
- List of New Testament uncials
- Coptic versions of the Bible
- Textual criticism
