= Uncial 0254 =

- New Testament manuscript
- Text: Galatians 5:13-17
- Date: 5th century
- Script: Greek
- Now at: Qubbat al-Khazna
- Size: 18 x 12 cm
- Type: Alexandrian text-type
- Category: I

Uncial 0254 (in the Gregory-Aland numbering), is a Greek uncial manuscript of the New Testament. Palaeographically it has been assigned to the 5th century.

== Description ==
The codex contains a small part of the Epistle to the Galatians 5:13-17, on two parchment leaves (18 cm by 12 cm). It is written in one column per page, 20 lines per page, in uncial letters.

It is a palimpsest, the upper text is written in Arabic.

Currently it is dated by the INTF to the 5th century.

== Location ==
Formerly the codex was held at the Qubbat al-Khazna in Damascus. The present location of the codex is unknown. Currently the manuscript is not accessible.

== Text ==
The Greek text of this codex is a representative of the Alexandrian text-type. Aland placed it in Category I.

== See also ==
- List of New Testament uncials
- Textual criticism
