= Uncial 0274 =

- New Testament manuscript
- Text: Mark 6-10 †
- Date: c. 400-500
- Script: Greek
- Found: 1976, Nubia
- Now at: Coptic Museum
- Size: 28 x 33 cm
- Type: Alexandrian text-type
- Category: II

Uncial 0274 (in the Gregory-Aland numbering), is a Greek uncial manuscript of the New Testament. Paleographically it has been assigned to the 5th century.

== Description ==
The codex contains a small parts of the Gospel of Mark 6–10, on 4 parchment leaves (28 cm by 33 cm). The text is written in two columns per page, 30 lines per page, in uncial letters.

== Contents ==
The codex contains: Gospel of Mark 6:56-7:4; 7:6-9; 7:13-15; 7:17; 7:19-23; 7:29; 7:34-35; 8:3-4; 8:8-11; 9:20-22; 9:26-41; 9:43; 9:45; 9:47-10:1; 10:17-22.

Textual Missing Mark 7:16, 9:44 & 9:46.

Currently it is dated by the INTF to the 5th century.

== Text ==
The Greek text of this codex probably is a representative of the Alexandrian text-type. According to Kurt and Barbara Aland it does not support the Byzantine text against the original, it agrees 6 times with the Byzantine when it has the same reading as the original text. It agrees 19 times with the original text against the Byzantine. It has 2 independent or distinctive readings. Alands placed it with hesitation in Category II.

Aland gave the following textual profile for it: 0^{1} 6^{1/2} 19^{2} 2^{S}.

== Location ==
After discovering it was held in Cairo. Currently the codex is housed at the Coptic Museum (6569/6571) in Cairo.

== See also ==
- List of New Testament uncials
- Textual criticism
