= Uncial 0156 =

- New Testament manuscript
- Text: 2 Peter 3:2-10
- Date: 8th century
- Script: Greek
- Now at: Qubbat al-Khazna
- Size: 12 x 8 cm
- Type: Alexandrian text-type
- Category: II

Uncial 0156 (in the Gregory-Aland numbering), is a Greek uncial manuscript of the New Testament, α 1006 (in the Soden numbering), dated palaeographically to the 8th century.

The codex contains a small parts of the Second Epistle of Peter 3:2-10, on one parchment leaf (12 cm by 8 cm). It is written in two columns per page, 21 lines per page, in uncial letters.

The Greek text of this codex is a representative of the Alexandrian text-type. Kurt Aland placed it in Category II.

Currently it is dated by the Institute for New Testament Textual Research to the 8th century.

The codex used to be held in Qubbat al-Khazna in Damascus. The location of the codex is unknown. The manuscript is not accessible.

== See also ==
- List of New Testament uncials
- Textual criticism
