= Uncial 077 =

Greek manuscript of the New Testament

- New Testament manuscript
- Text: Acts 13 †
- Date: 5th century
- Script: Greek
- Now at: Sinai Peninsula
- Size: ?
- Type: Alexandrian text-type
- Category: II

Uncial 077 (in the Gregory-Aland numbering), is a Greek uncial manuscript of the New Testament, paleographically assigned to the 5th century. Only one leaf of the codex has survived.

== Description ==
The codex contains a part of the Acts of the Apostles (13:28-29).

The Greek text of this codex is a representative of the Alexandrian text-type with some alien readings. Aland placed it in Category II.

Currently it is dated by the INTF to the 5th century.

The codex is located in Sinai Harris App. 5.

== See also ==
- List of New Testament uncials
- Textual criticism
