= Uncial 0270 =

- New Testament manuscript
- Text: 1 Corinthians 15:10-15,19-25
- Date: 4th/5th century
- Script: Greek
- Now at: University of Amsterdam
- Size: 15.5 x 10.5 cm
- Type: Alexandrian text-type
- Category: II

Uncial 0270 (in the Gregory-Aland numbering), is a Greek uncial manuscript of the New Testament. The manuscript paleographically has been assigned to the 4th/5th century.

== Description ==
It contains a small parts of the First Epistle to the Corinthians (15:10-15,19-25), on 1 parchment leaf (15.5 cm by 10.5 cm). Written in one column per page, 26 lines per page.

The Greek text of this codex a representative of the Alexandrian text-type. Aland placed it in Category II.

Currently it is dated by the INTF to the 4th or 5th century.

The codex currently is housed at the Library of the University of Amsterdam, in Amsterdam, with the shelf number GX 200.

It was examined by J.S. Sibinga, who published its text.

== See also ==
- List of New Testament uncials
- Textual criticism
