= Papyrus 26 =

Papyrus 𝔓^{26}
- New Testament manuscript
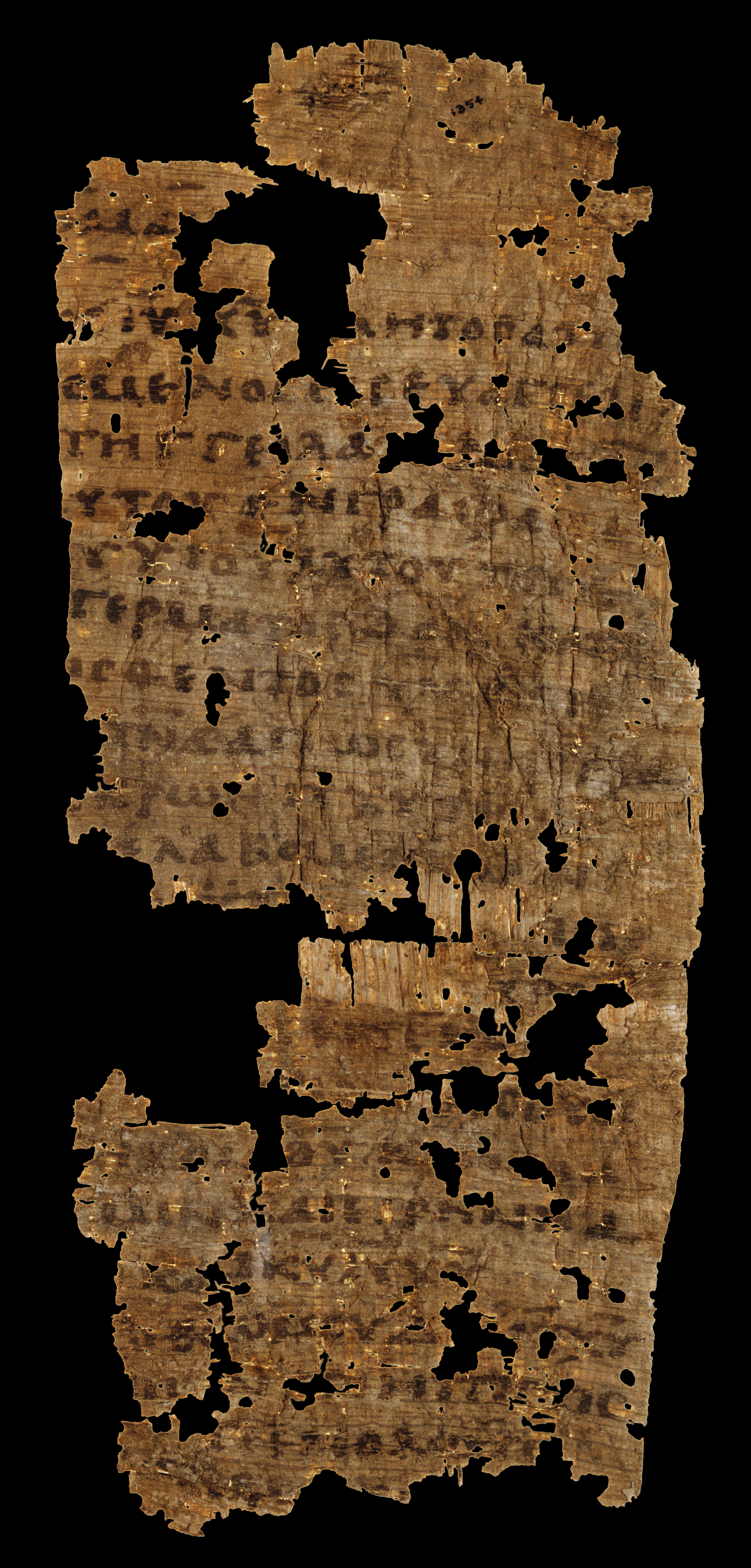
- Recto Romans 1:1–9
- Name: P. Oxy. 1354
- Text: Romans 1 †
- Date: ca. 600
- Script: Greek
- Found: Egypt
- Now at: Southern Methodist University
- Cite: B. P. Grenfell & A. S. Hunt, Oxyrynchus Papyri XI, (London 1915), pp. 6-9
- Type: Alexandrian text-type
- Category: I

Papyrus 26 (in the Gregory-Aland numbering), designated by 𝔓^{26}, is an early copy of the New Testament in Greek. It is a papyrus manuscript of the Epistle to the Romans, it contains only Romans 1:1-16. The manuscript paleographically has been assigned to the late 6th or early 7th century.

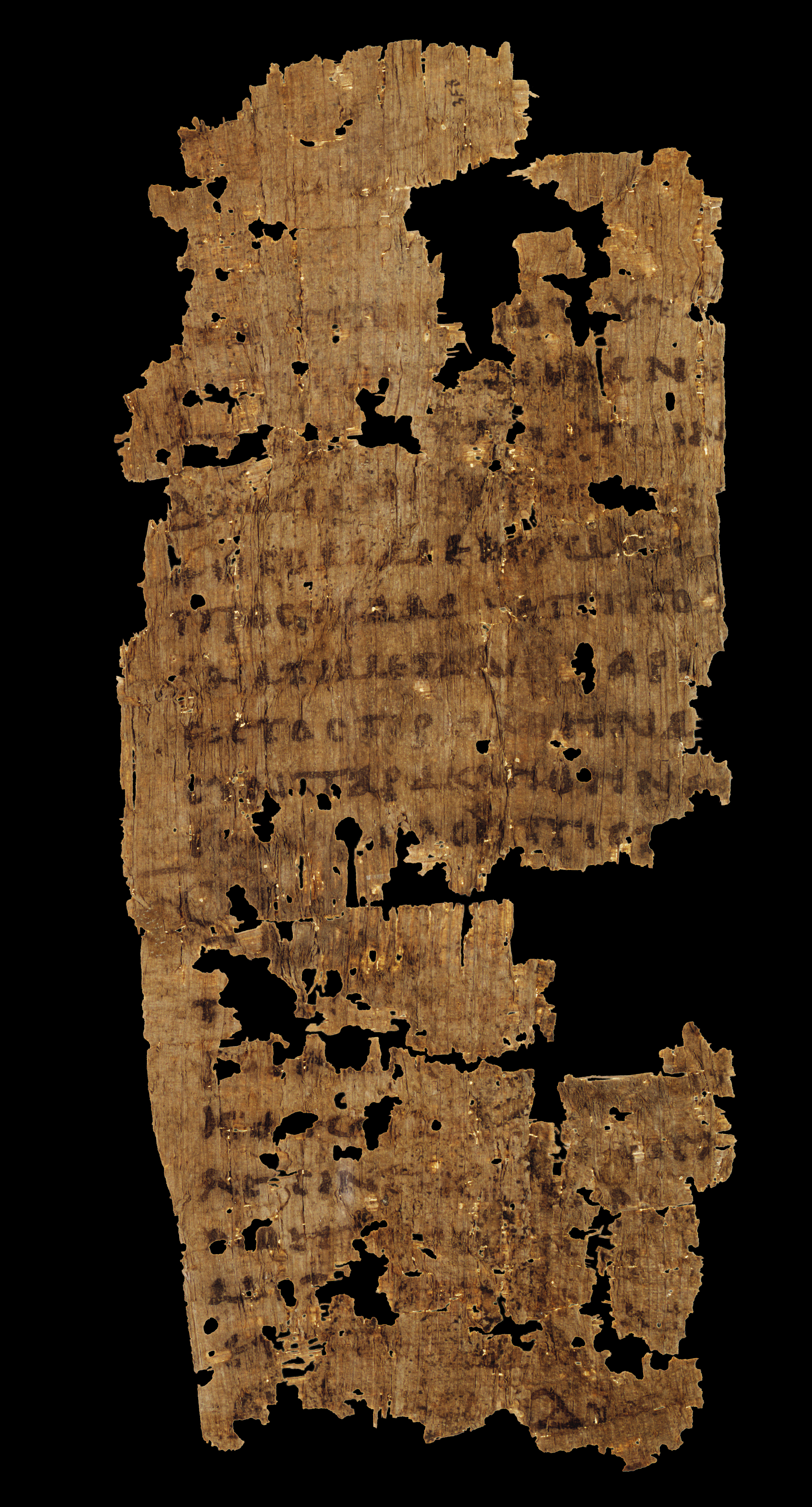
Verso Romans 1:10–16

The Greek text of this codex is a representative of the Alexandrian text-type. Aland placed it in Category I.

It is currently housed at the Southern Methodist University in Dallas, Texas.

== See also ==
- List of New Testament papyri
