= Papyrus 33 =

Papyrus 𝔓^{33}
- New Testament manuscript
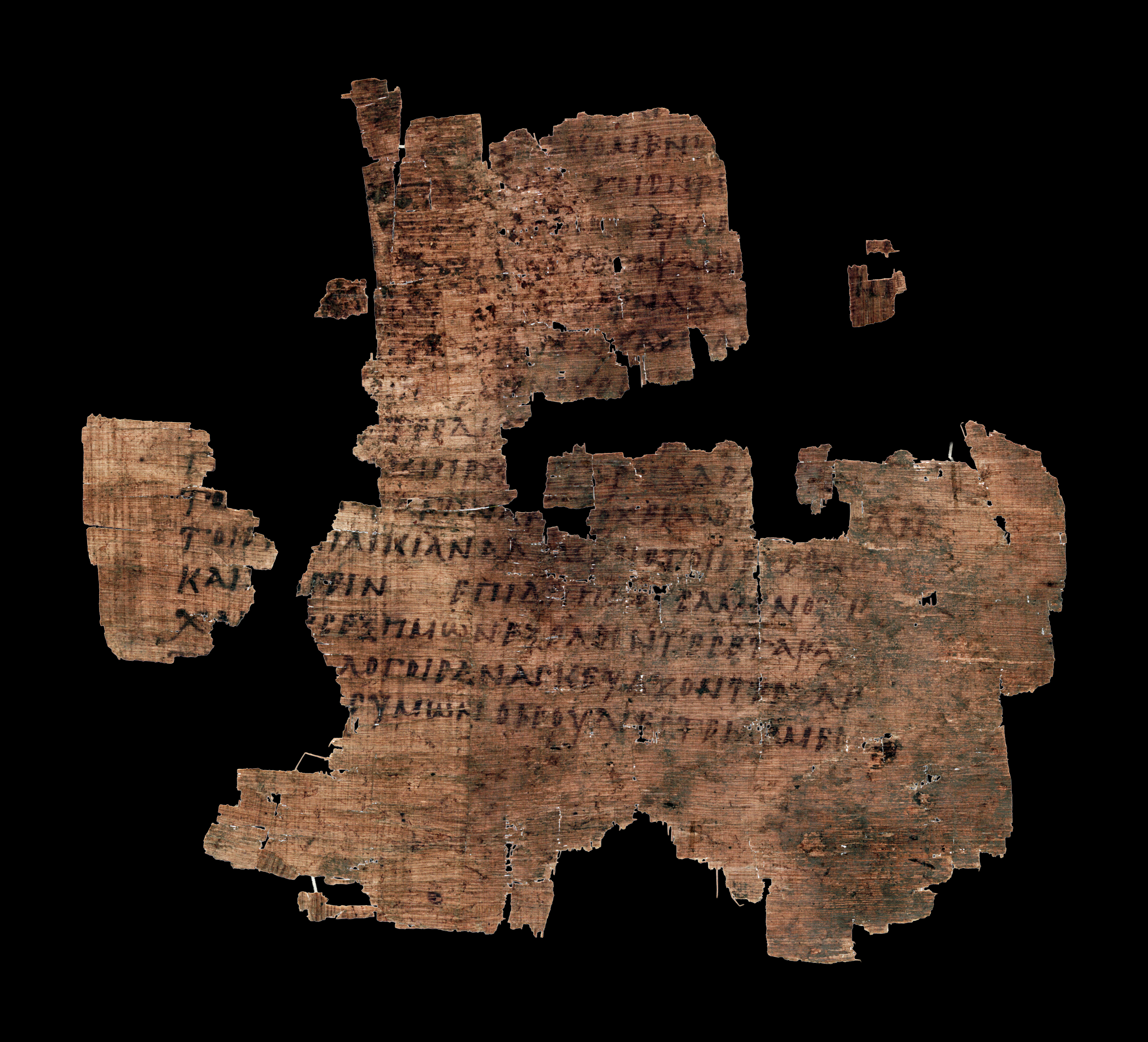
- Papyrus 33 Fragment 1(G 39783) recto Acts 7:6–10
- Text: Acts 7; 15 †
- Date: 6th century
- Script: Greek
- Found: Egypt
- Now at: Österreichische Nationalbibliothek
- Cite: C. Wessely, Stud zur Pal und Pap XII, (Leipzig 1912), pp. 245
- Type: Alexandrian text-type
- Category: II

Papyrus 33 (in the Gregory-Aland numbering), designated by symbol 𝔓^{33}, is a copy of the New Testament in Greek. It is a papyrus manuscript of the Acts of the Apostles, it contains only Acts 7:6-10.13-18; 15:21-24.26-32. The manuscript paleographically has been assigned to the sixth century. 𝔓^{58} was a part of the same codex to which 𝔓^{33} belonged.

The Greek text of this codex is a representative of the Alexandrian text-type. Aland placed it in Category II.

It is currently housed at the Austrian National Library (Pap. G. 17973, 26133, 35831, 39783) in Vienna.

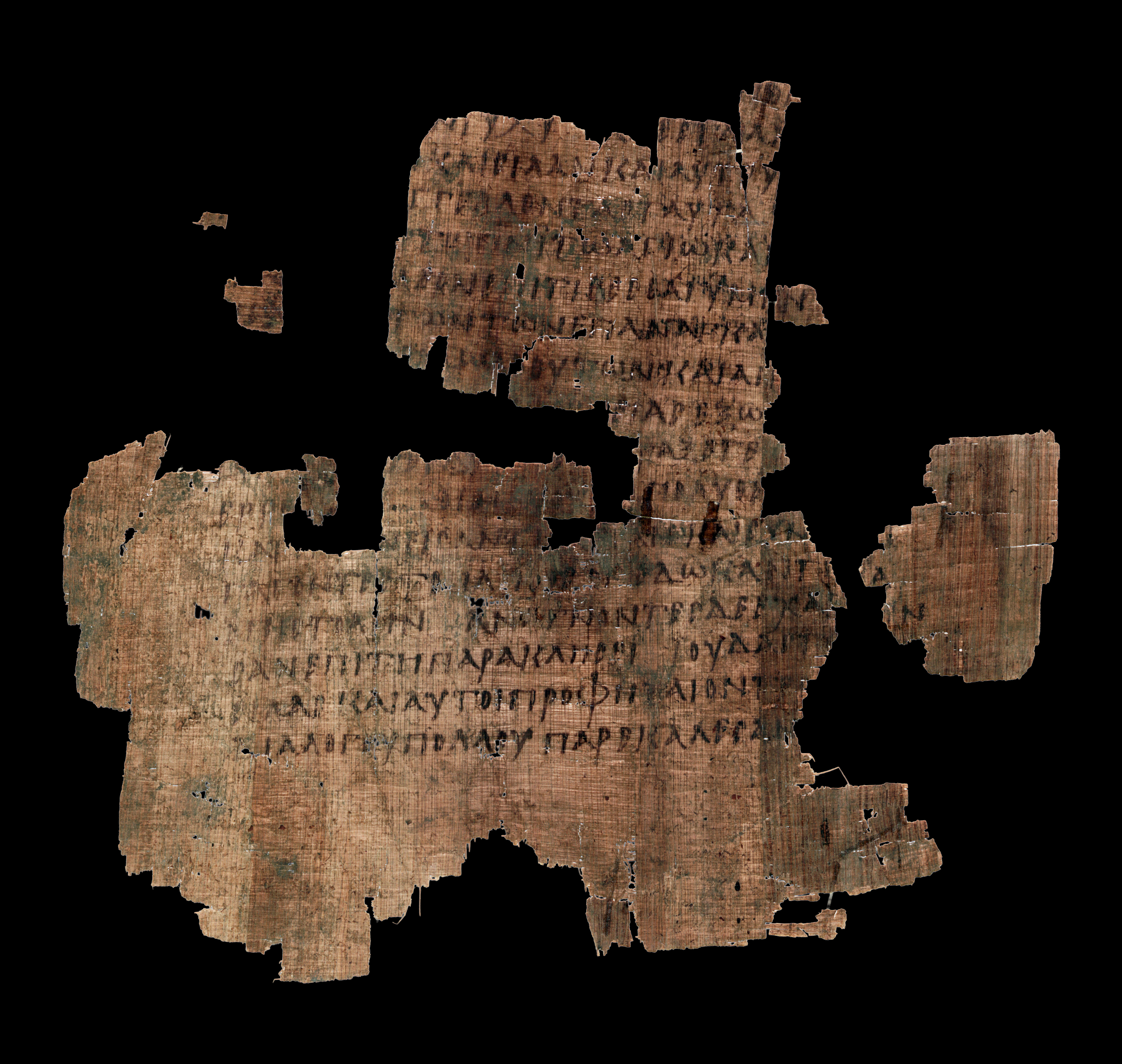
Papyrus 33 Fragment 1(G 39783) verso Acts 7:13–18

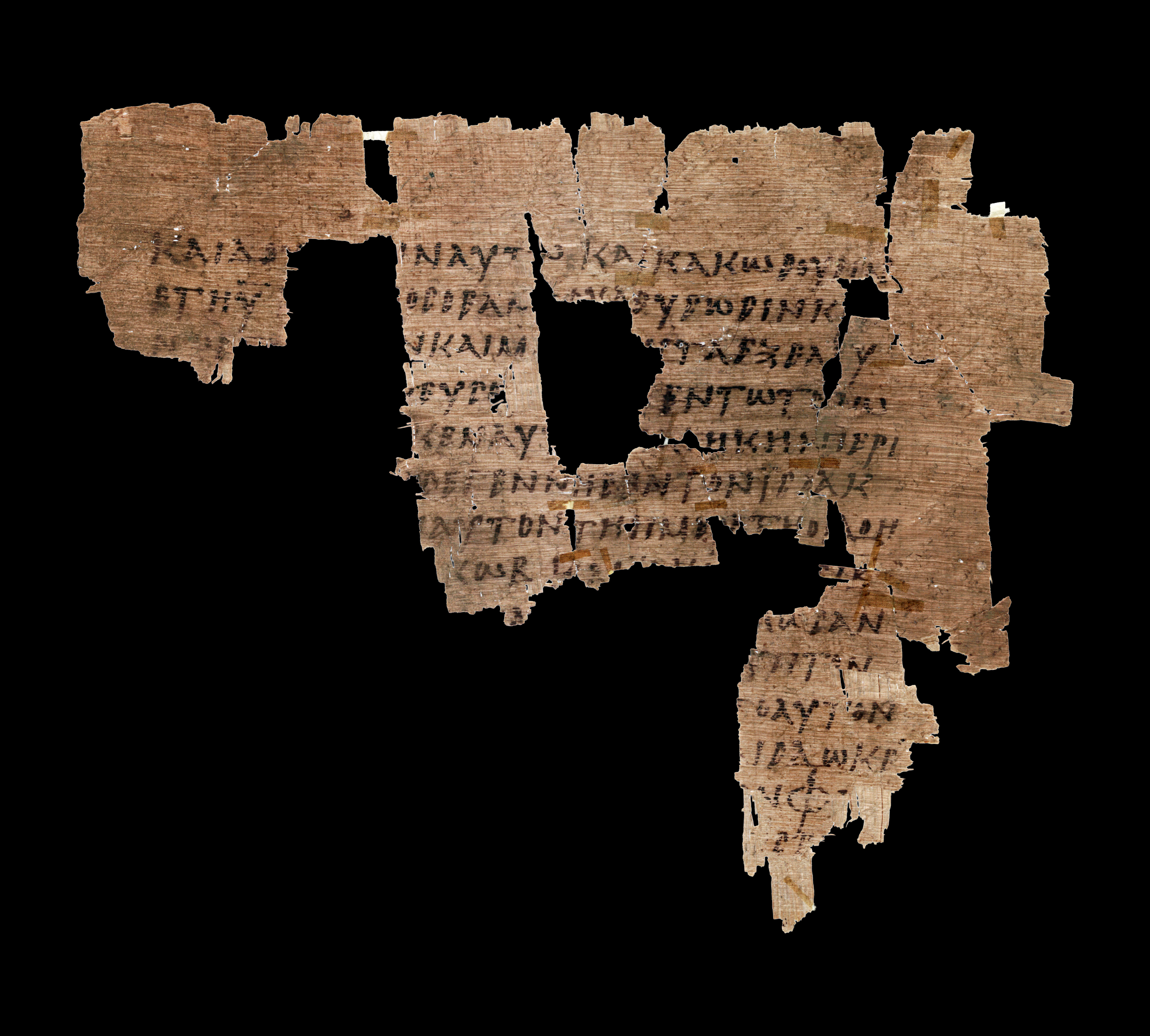
Papyrus 33 Fragment 2 (G 17973 + G 26133 + G 35831) recto Acts 15:21–24

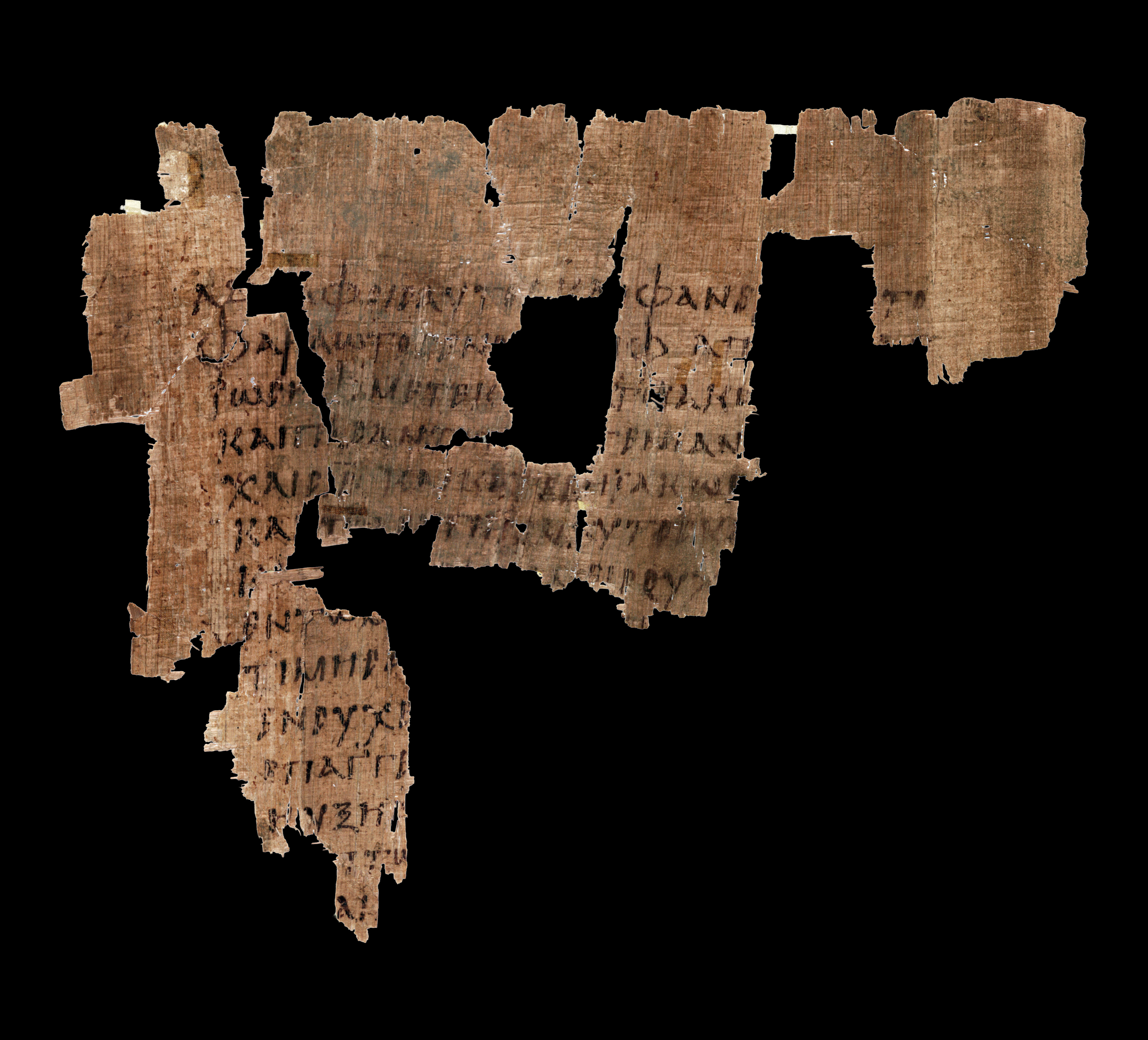
Papyrus 33 Fragment 2 (G 17973 + G 26133 + G 35831) verso Acts 15:26–32

== See also ==
- List of New Testament papyri
