= Minuscule 2464 =

- New Testament manuscript
- Text: Acts, General epistles, Paul †
- Date: 9th century
- Script: Greek
- Now at: Monastery of St. John the Theologian
- Type: Alexandrian / Byzantine
- Category: II

Minuscule 2464 (in the Gregory-Aland numbering), is a Greek minuscule manuscript of the New Testament, on 213 parchment leaves. Dated palaeographically to the 9th century. The text is written in one column per page, in 26 lines per page.

== Description ==
The codex contains the text of the Acts of the Apostles, General epistles, and Pauline epistles with considerable lacunae. 52 leaves were damaged by water.

The Greek text of the codex is a representative of the Alexandrian text-type. The basic text is the late Alexandrian, with some Byzantine text-type readings. The Romans is almost purely Byzantine. It has 6956 textual variants. Kurt Aland placed it in Category II.

The codex currently is housed at the Monastery of Saint John the Theologian (Ms. 742), in Patmos.

== See also ==
- List of New Testament minuscules
- Textual criticism
