= Papyrus Collection of the Austrian National Library =

Coordinates: 48°12′18.7″N 16°21′54.1″E

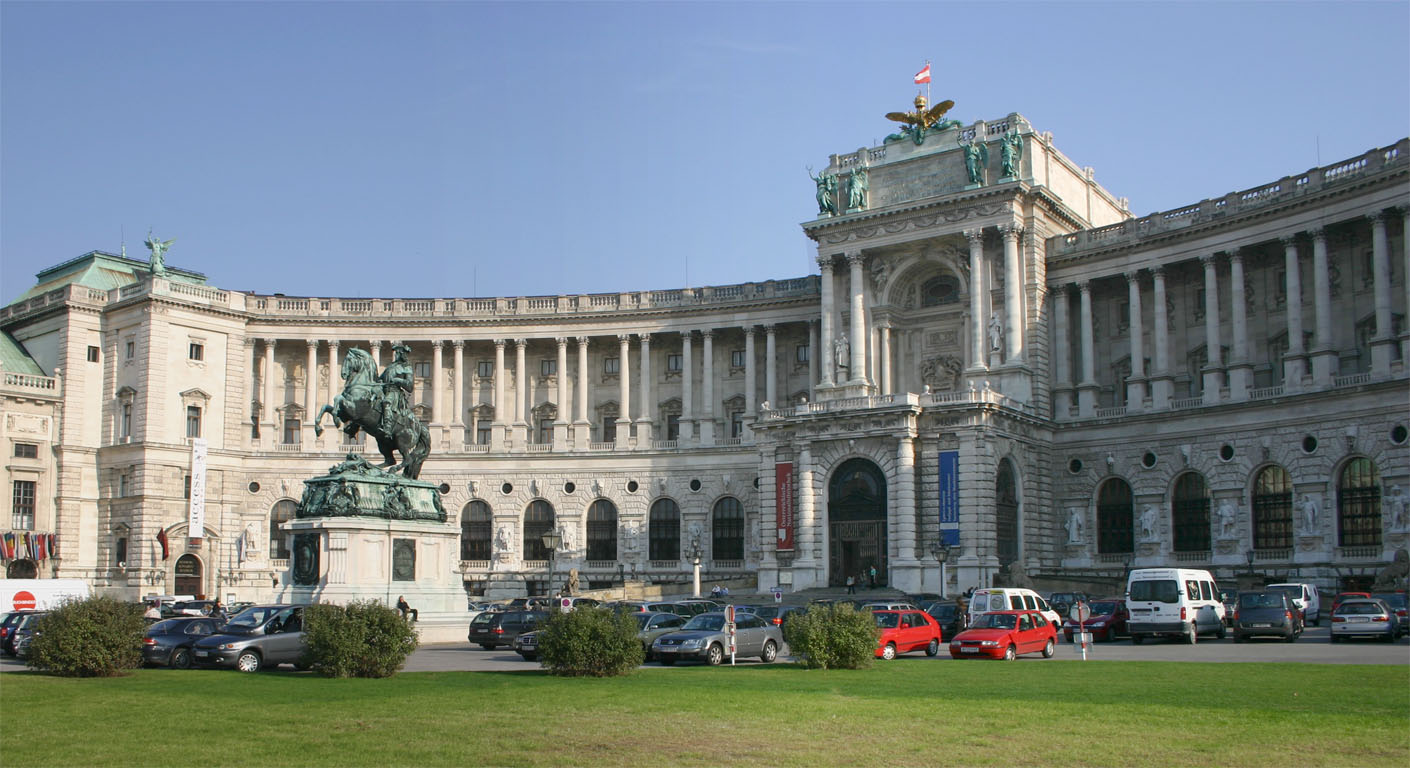
The Neue Burg wing of the Hofburg palace in Vienna, which houses the Rainer Collection

The Papyrus Collection of the Austrian National Library, also known as the Rainer Collection (Papyruskollektion Erzherzog Rainer) and Vienna Papyrus Collection (Papyrussammlung Wien), is a papyrus collection of the Austrian National Library at Hofburg palace in Vienna. It contains around 180,000 objects overall. It is one of the most significant collections in papyrology, containing writings documenting 3 millennia of the history of Egypt from 1500 BCE–1500 CE: Ancient Egypt, Hellenistic Egypt, Roman Egypt, and Egypt during Muslim rule. It includes a specialist library of around 19,500 books and journals as well. The Austrian National Library preserves and restores the stored papyri and facilitates scholarly research and publication based on these ancient documents.

The core of the collection originates from the private collection of Archduke Rainer, who gave the collection to Emperor Franz Joseph I of Austria in 1899. Besides papyri, the collection includes papers, records on clay tablets, stone tablets, inscribed wood and wax trays, leathers, sheepskins, textiles, and bones, as well as gold, silver and bronze articles with inscriptions. A papyrus museum opened in 1999, displaying a portion of the collection to the public. The Rainer Collection was added to UNESCO's Memory of the World Programme Register in 2001.

== History ==
Papyrus is an ancient medium upon which to write popular across the Mediterranean region. It was considerably cheaper to use than inscribing clay tablets; however, it has the disadvantage that moisture would tend to cause papyri to decay over time, meaning the vast majority of papyri have disintegrated or are no longer readable. The main exception to this was in Egypt, where the harsh desert climate preserved papyri for centuries. In the second half of the 19th century, both scholars and local Egyptians realized this, and began to search for old discarded papyri as well as report local papyri caches. In 1878–1879, the Viennese dealer in antiquities Theodor Graf purchased recently found papyri from Faiyum, known as Arsinoe in the Hellenistic period. Graf contacted Professor of Oriental History at the University of Vienna Josef Karabacek and arranged the shipping of around 10,000 papyri to him. The papyri made their way to Vienna in 1881 and 1882 while awaiting a buyer; at the end of 1883, Archduke Rainer Ferdinand agreed to purchase the papyri. Professor Karabacek managed and processed both the sale and the collection. The collection was initially stored at the Österreichischen Museum für Kunst und Industrie (the predecessor of the modern Museum of Applied Arts). Archduke Rainer continued to expand the collection with new purchases that Graf arranged, including papyri from digs at Hermopolis, Heracleopolis Magna, and other sites in the Faiyum area such as Soknopaiou Nesos. Rainer gifted the collection to his uncle Emperor Franz Joseph I of Austria on August 18, 1899 as a birthday present. At Rainer's request, Franz Joseph incorporated them as a special collection at the Imperial and Royal Court Library (now known as the Austrian National Library). The collection was also moved next to the Josefsplatz. Additional purchases of mainly ostracon were made in 1899 and 1911.

In 1920, after the dissolution of Austria-Hungary, the Imperial and Royal Library became the National Library, and ownership passed to the state of Austria rather than the Imperial family. The papyrus collection moved to new premises at the Palais Friedrich (the modern Albertina museum) in 1921. On March 12, 1945, during the bombing of Vienna, the collection's building was damaged by a bomb. On April 18, 1954, new premises in the rebuilt Albertina were opened to the public. In 1998 the collection and library were relocated to new premises in the Neue Burg wing of the Hofburg palace, and in 1999 a new museum section opened that displayed a selection of the collection to the public. After being nominated in 2000, the Rainer Collection was added to UNESCO's Memory of the World Programme register in 2001. In 2004, Bernhard Palme was appointed Chair in Papyrology at the University of Vienna's Institut für Alte Geschichte und Altertumskunde, Papyrologie und Epigraphik.

== Collection ==
The main focus of the collection are Greek, Arabic, and Coptic items. The Greek inventory of papyri is the largest, with the era of Ptolemaic Egypt, early Roman Egypt, and later Byzantine Egypt being especially strongly represented as an era when papyri were in common use.

The total inventory broken down by language is roughly:

- Egyptian hieroglyphs and Hieratic: around 275 objects, 170 of which are papyri.
- Demotic: around 2,000 objects, including 1,551 papyri and 352 ostraca.
- Coptic: around 26,000 objects, including 7,153 papyri, 1,300 parchments, 935 papers, and 770 ostraca.
- Greek: around 70,000 objects, including around 41,000 papyri, about 3000 parchments, and 12,000 fragments.
- Latin: around 150 objects, of which 136 are papyri and 11 are parchments.
- Arabic: around 75,000 objects, including 17,000 papyri, 17,000 papers, and 382 parchments.
- Hebrew: around 200 objects.
- A small number of other objects with writing or inscriptions in Ethiopic, Syriac, Aramaic, Pahlavi, and others.

== Directors ==
- Josef Karabacek (1899–1904)
- Karl Wessely (1904–1922)
- Theodor Seif (1923–1930)
- Hans Gerstinger (1923–1936)
- Walter Till (1936–1942 and 1948–1951)
- Franz Unterkircher (1951–1956)
- Herbert Hunger (1956–1962)
- Helene Loebenstein (1962–1984)
- Herman Harrauer (1984-2005)
- Cornelia Römer (2005–2009)
- Bernhard Palme (since 2009)

== Gallery ==
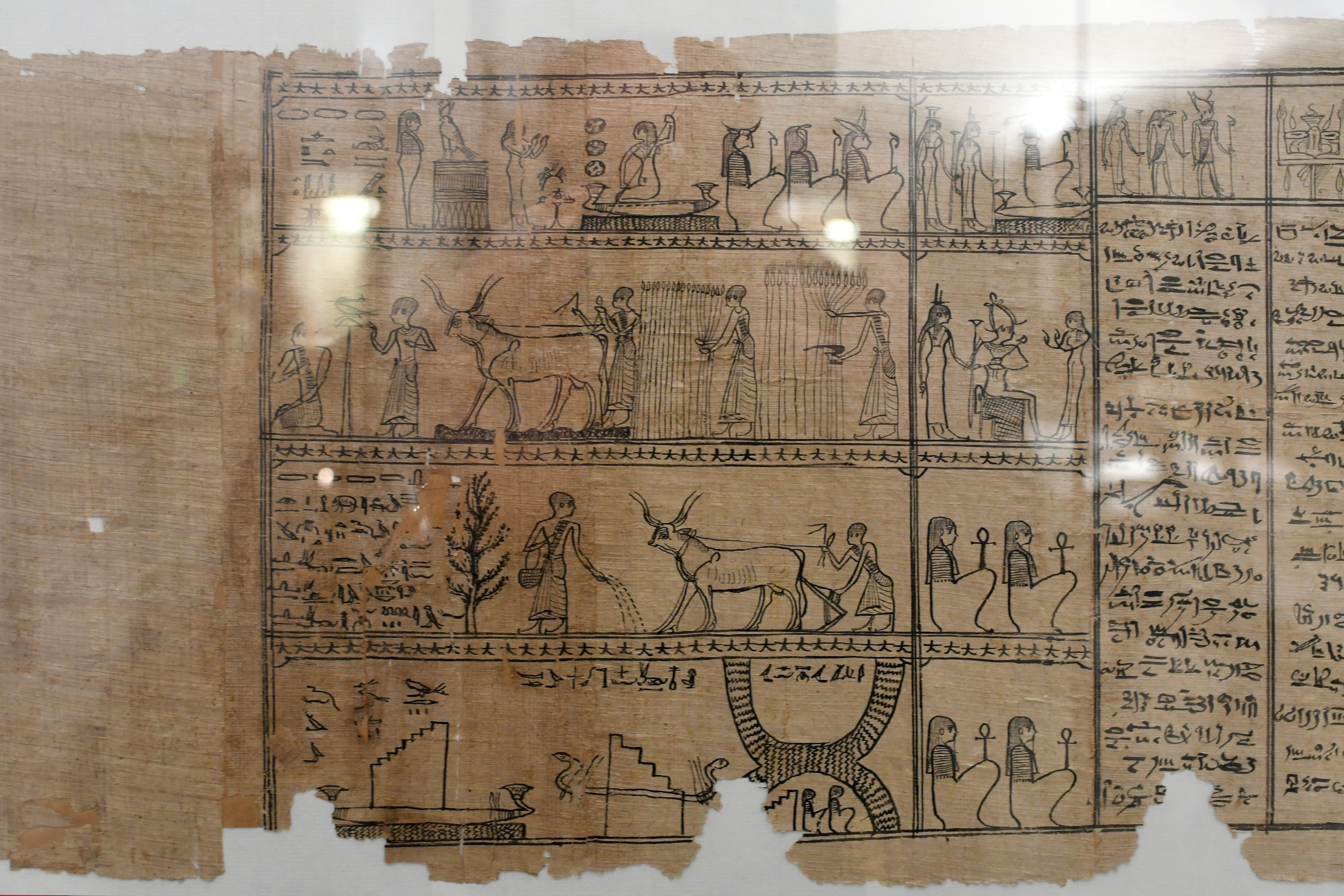
Part of the Taruma Book of the Dead (Memphis, Hieratic Script, Ptolemaic Egypt in 3rd century BC)

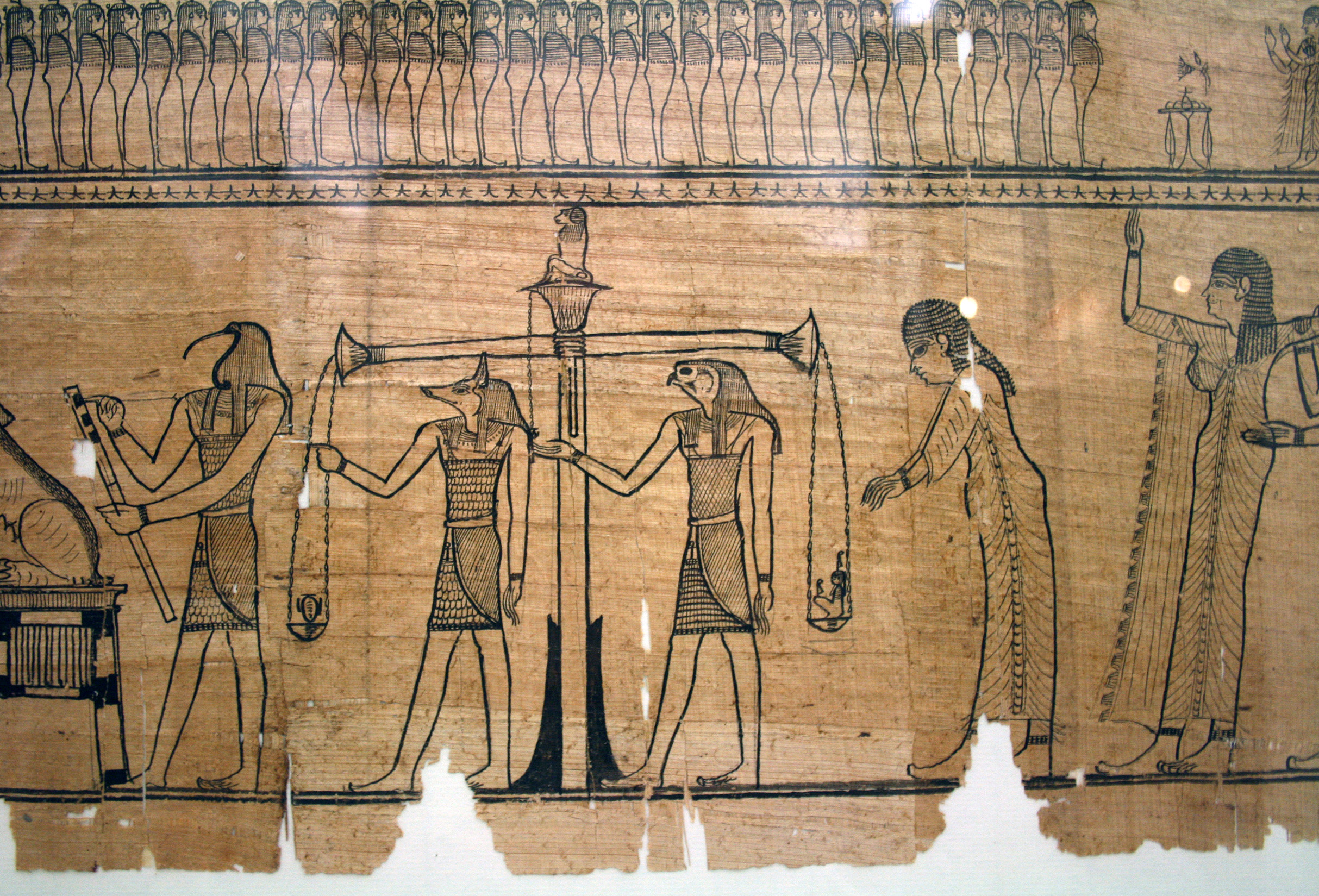
Detail of the Taruma Book of the Dead

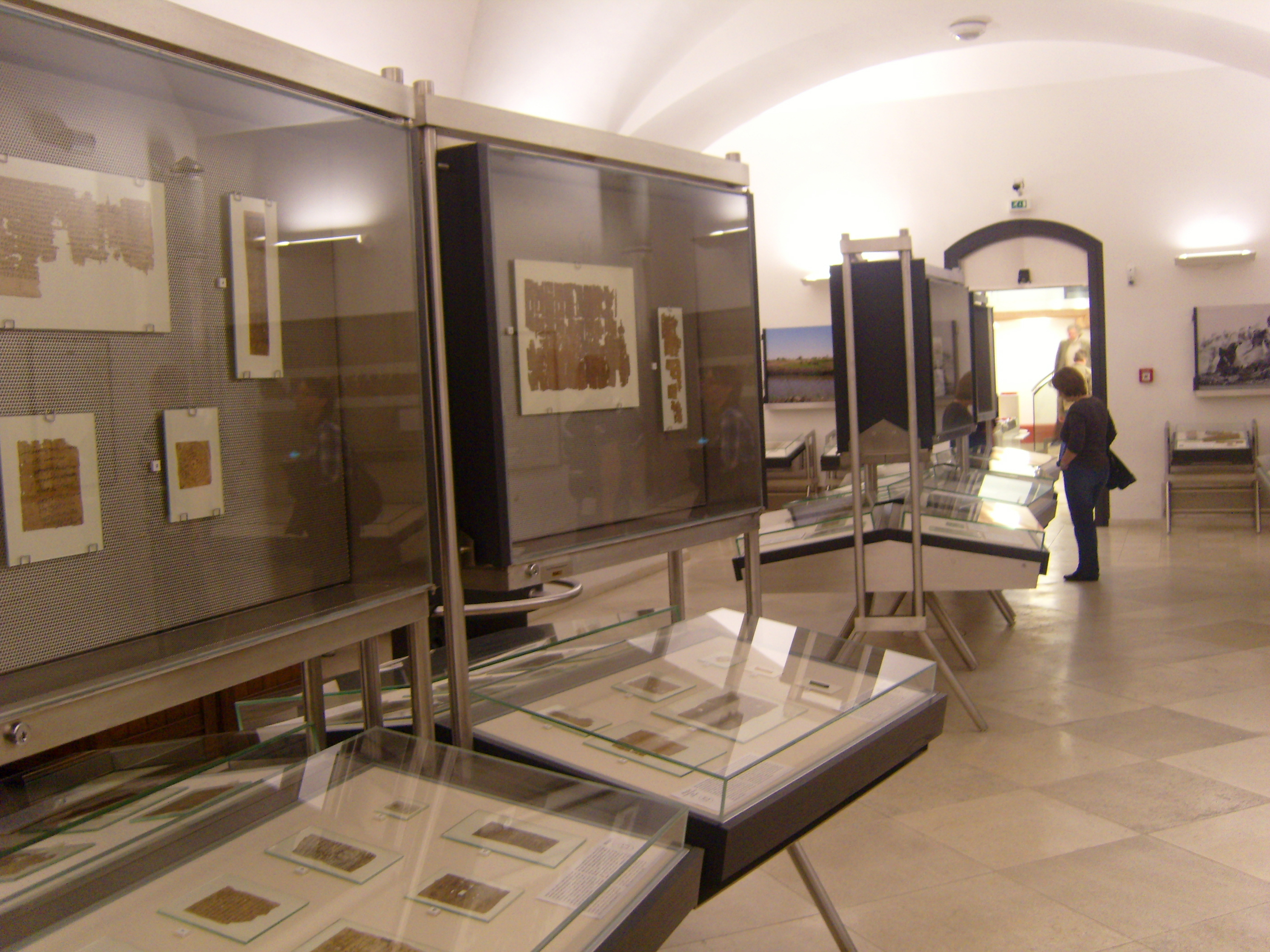
Interior of the museum, showing papyri

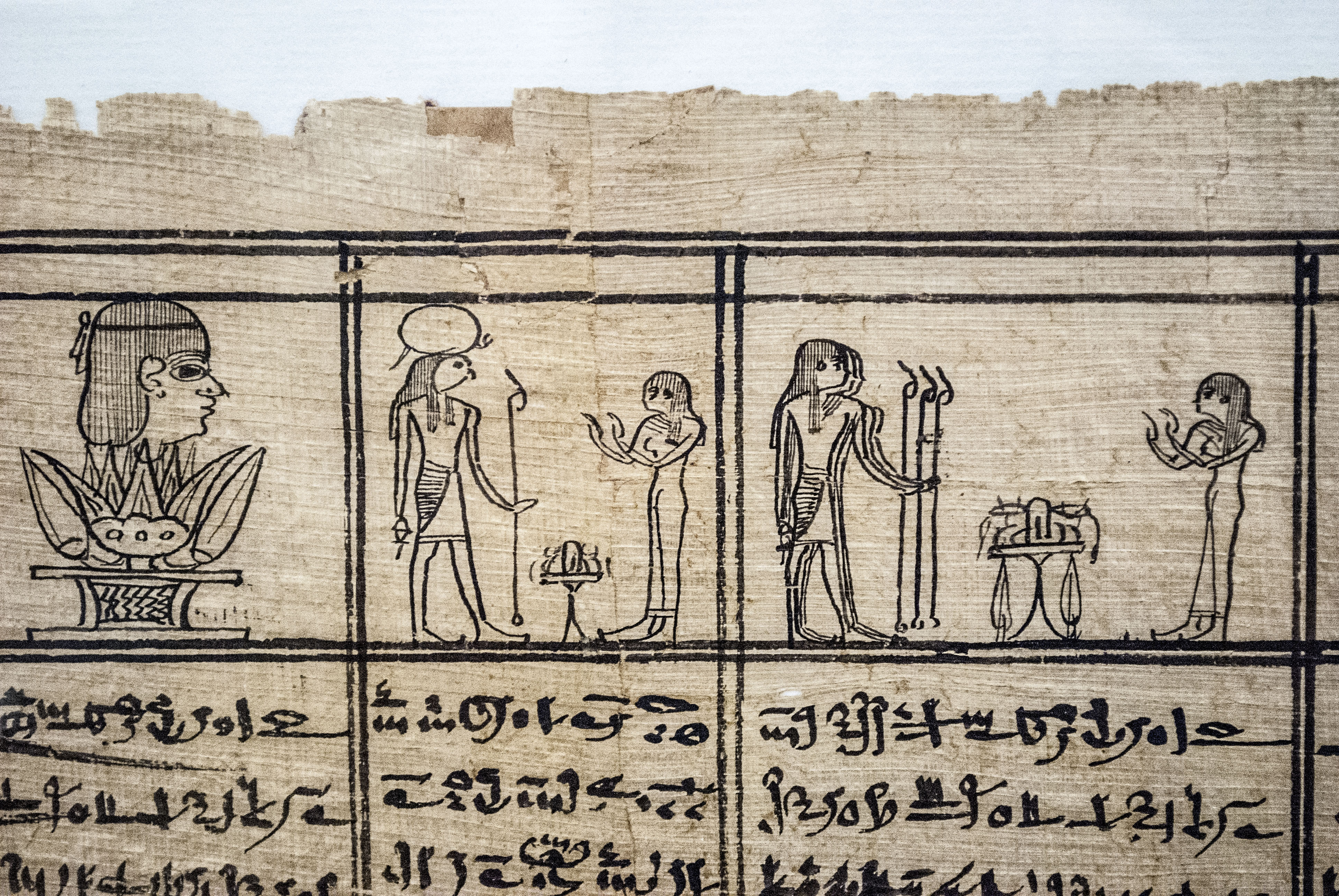
A papyrus on display
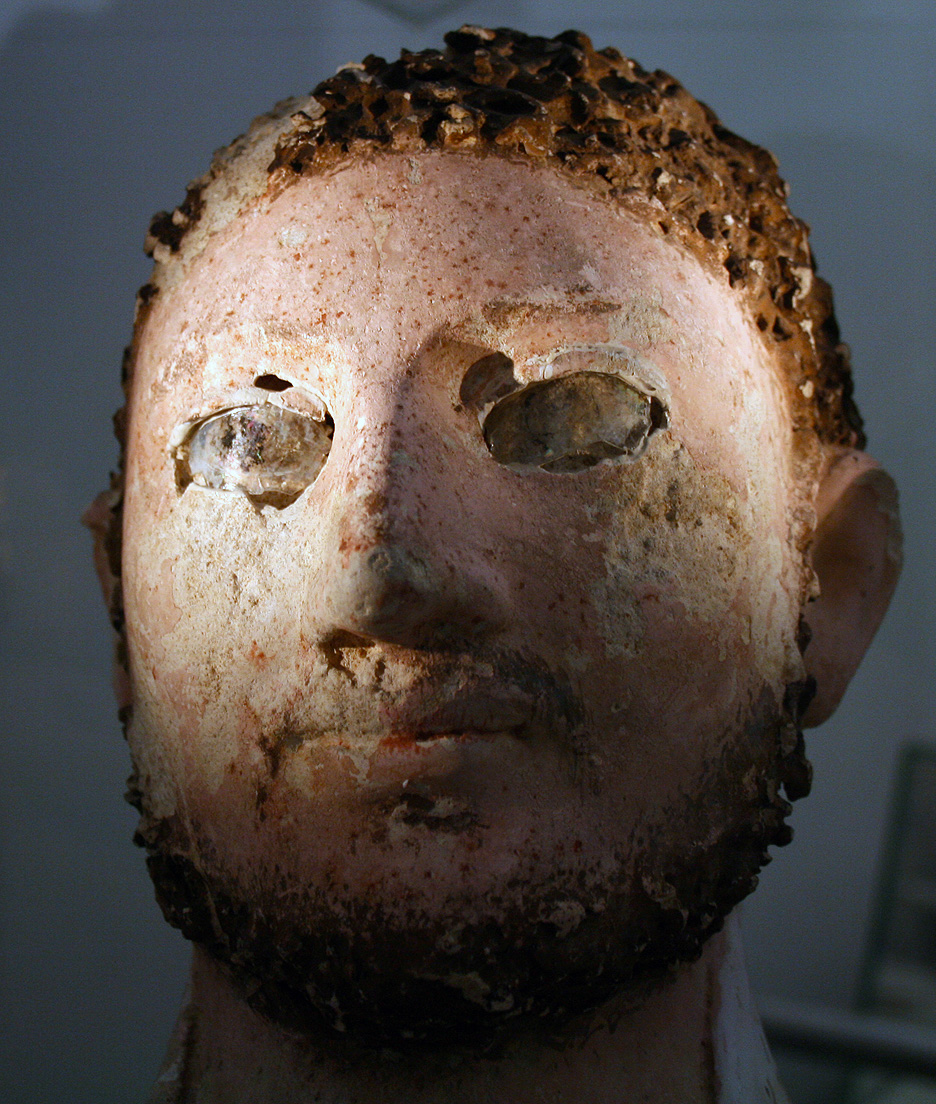
Egyptian funerary mask

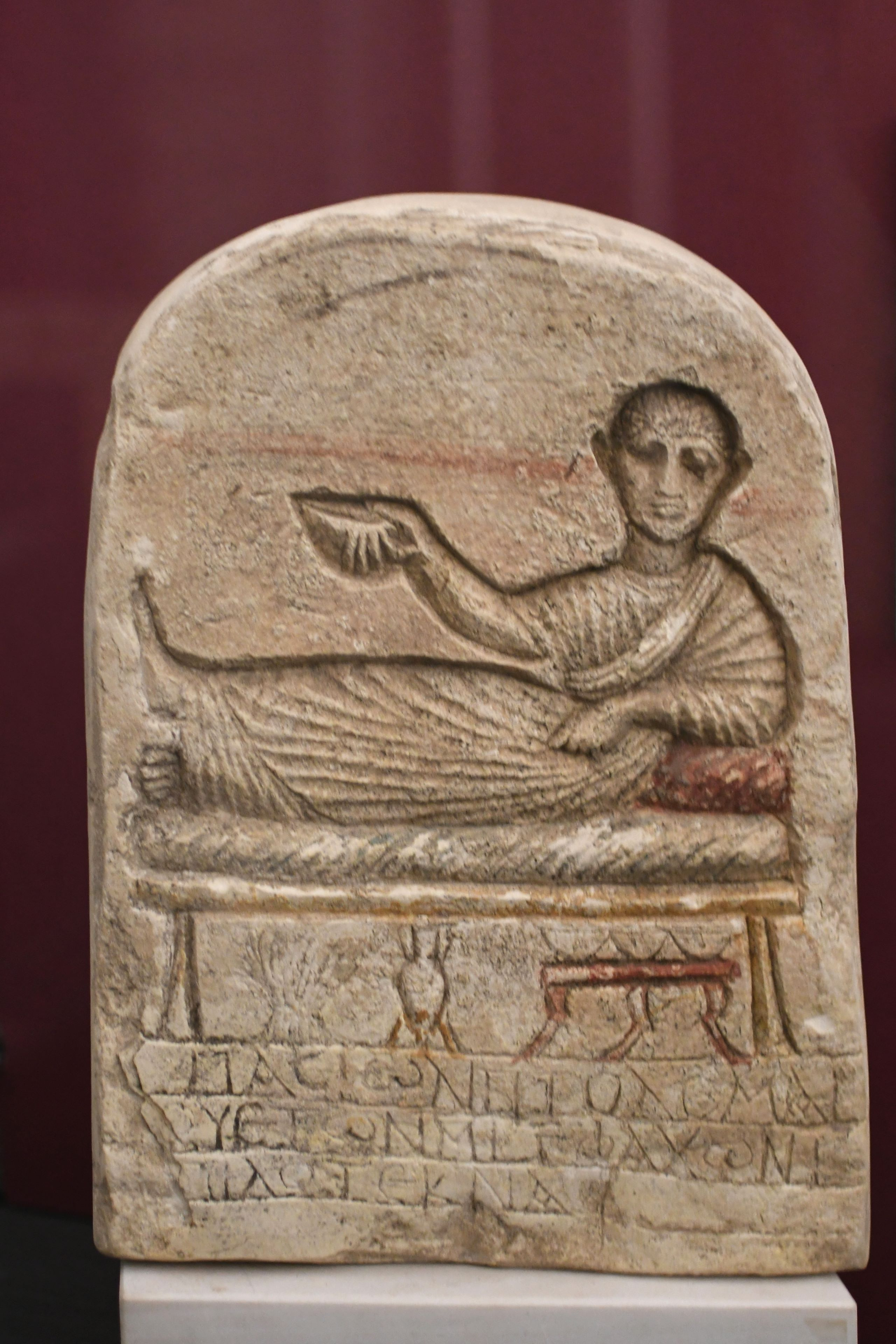
A grave stele, 1st or 2nd century

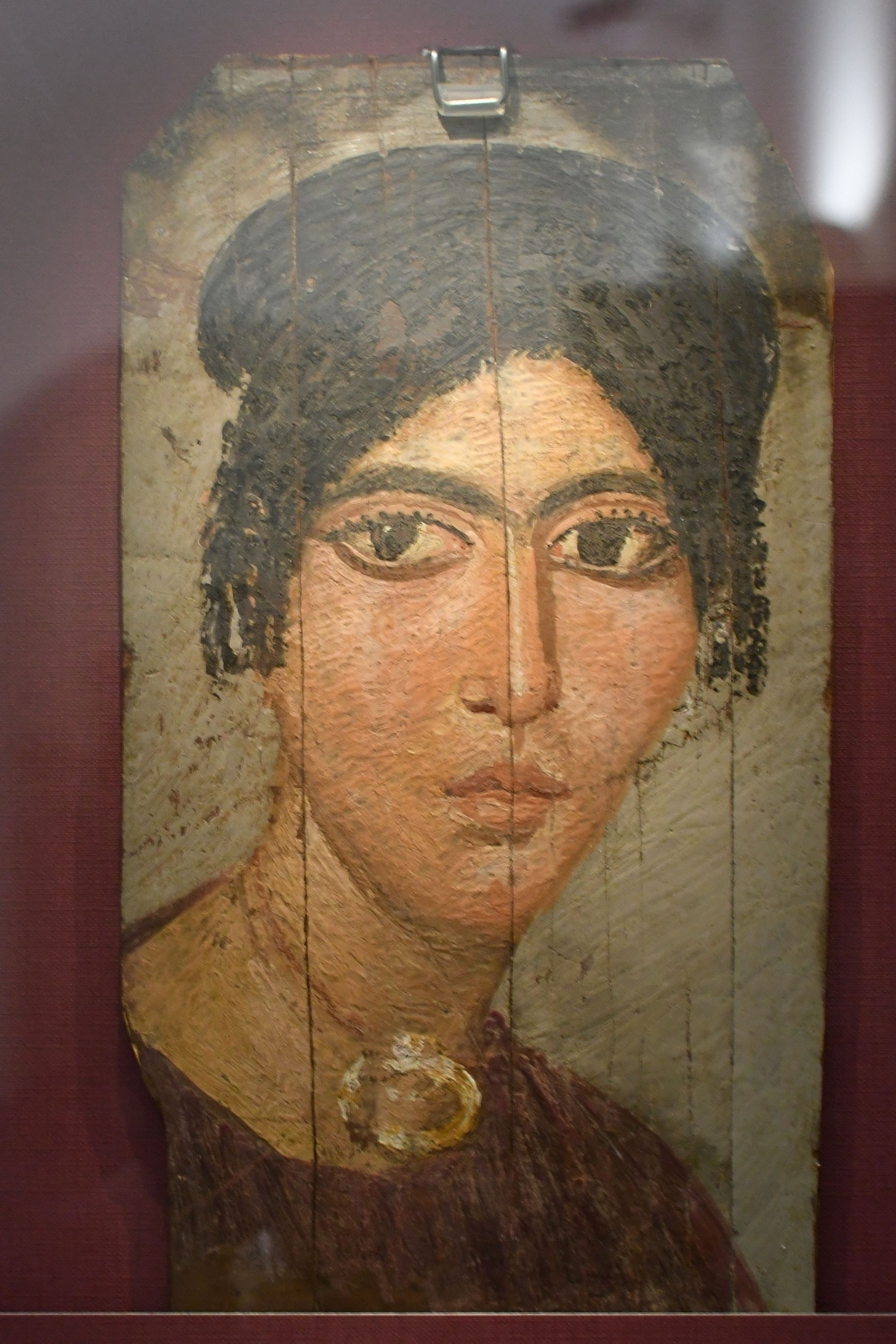
Portrait of a young girl, from Faiyum, 2nd century

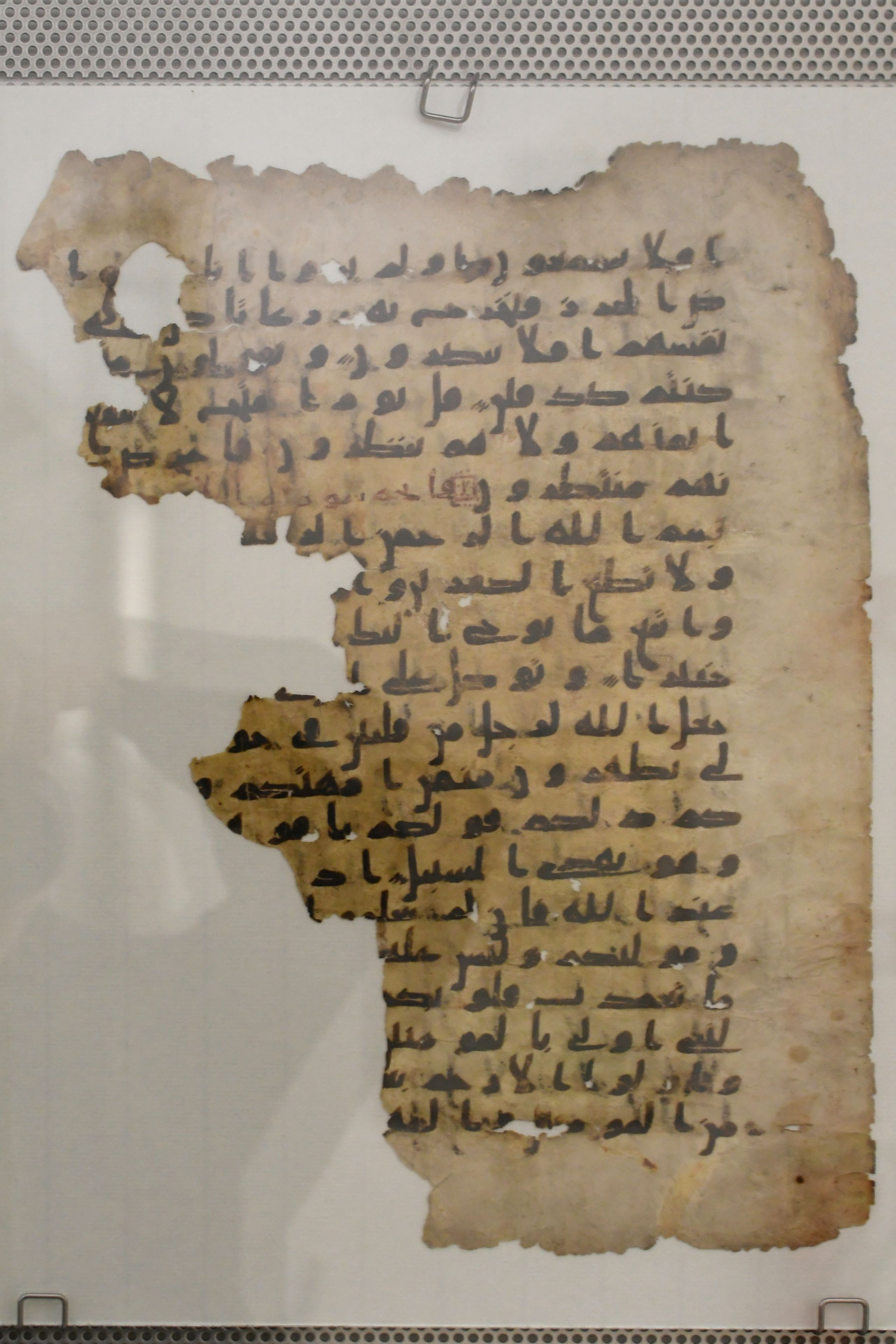
Fragment of the Quran
