= Dating the Bible =

Estimating dates of composition for parts of the Bible

Some of the oldest surviving Hebrew Bible manuscripts, the Dead Sea Scrolls, date to c. the 2nd century BCE. Some of these scrolls are presently stored at the Shrine of the Book in Jerusalem. The oldest text of the entire Christian Bible, including the New Testament, is the Codex Sinaiticus dating from the 4th century CE, with its Old Testament a copy of a Greek translation known as the Septuagint. The oldest extant manuscripts of the vocalized Masoretic Text date to the 9th century CE. With the exception of a few biblical sections in the Nevi'im, virtually no Old Testament biblical text is contemporaneous with the events it describes.

Internal evidence within the texts of the 27-book New Testament canon suggests that most of these books were written in the 1st century CE. The first book written is thought to be either the Epistle to the Galatians (written around 48 CE) or 1 Thessalonians, written around 50 CE. The latest book written is thought to be the Second Peter, written around 110 CE. The final book in the ordering of the canon, the Book of Revelation, is generally accepted by traditional scholarship to have been written during the reign of Domitian (81–96) before the writing of 1 and 2 Timothy, Titus and the Epistles of John. Dating the composition of the texts relies primarily on internal evidence, including direct references to historical events. Textual criticism, as well as epigraphic analysis of biblical manuscripts, provides further evidence that scholars consider when judging the relative age of sections of the Bible.

== Table I: Chronological overview ==
This table summarises the chronology of the main tables and serves as a guide to the historical periods mentioned. Much of the Hebrew Bible/Old Testament may have been assembled in the 5th century BCE. The New Testament books were composed largely in the second half of the 1st century CE. The deuterocanonical books fall largely in between.

Period	Books
Pre-monarchic; 13th century–1000 BCE	Late 13th century: Song of the Sea; 12th–10th: Psalm 29; Late 12th–late 11th: Song of Deborah (alternative datings to the monarchic period have been advanced); 11th-10th: Numbers 24; 12th–8th: Song of Moses (not including the editorializing layer of Deuteronomy 32:44–32:55)
Monarchic; 1000–587 BCE	Late 8th–early 7th: Amos (initial composition of earliest layer, Amos 2:6–9:10); "First Isaiah" (Isaiah 1–39), Hosea, Micah (1–3).; 7th: Nahum (based on its assumption of the fall of Thebes and call for the destruction of Nineveh), Zephaniah (in the reign of Josiah, c. 649–609 BCE), Habakkuk (possibly shortly before the Battle of Carchemish, 605 BCE); first edition of the Deuteronomistic history (Joshua, Judges, Samuel, Kings) in the reign of Josiah; Deuteronomy 5–26 in the reign of Josiah.; Late 7th–early 6th: early variation of the Priestly Blessing (from the oldest surviving Biblical text, the Ketef Hinnom scrolls)
Exilic; 586–539 BCE	Core of Obadiah around the fall of Jerusalem, 586 BCE; Completion of Deuteronomistic history (Joshua, Judges, Samuel, and Kings); Deuteronomy expanded with addition of chapters 1–4 and 29–30 to serve as an introduction to the Deuteronomistic history; Jeremiah active in the last decade of the 7th century and first decades of the 6th; Ezekiel active in Babylon 592–571 BCE; "Second Isaiah" (author of Isaiah 40–55) active in Babylon around mid-century; Expansion and reshaping of Hosea, Amos, Micah and Zephaniah; Possible early Psalms collection (psalms "of David") ending with psalm 89
Post-exilic (Persian); 538–332 BCE	Torah (Genesis, Exodus, Leviticus, and Numbers), with 250 BCE determined to be the last possible date for the final text based on manuscript evidence; Deuteronomy revised with expansions to chapters 19–25 and addition of chapter 27 and 31–34 to serve as conclusion to the Torah; "Third Isaiah" (Isaiah 56–66); Later version (the Masoretic Hebrew version) of Jeremiah; Haggai (self-dated to the second year of the Persian king Darius 520 BCE); Zechariah (chapters 1–8 contemporary with Haggai, chapters 9–14 from the 5th century); Malachi (5th century BCE, contemporaneous or immediately prior to the missions of Nehemiah and Ezra); Book of Joel (between 450 and 350 BCE); Chronicles (between 350 and 300 BCE); Origins of Ezra–Nehemiah (may have reached its final form as late as the Ptolemaic period, c. 300–200 BCE)
Post-exilic (Hellenistic); 331–164 BCE	Job, Ecclesiastes, Proverbs, and Song of Songs (possibly written in the 4th or even 5th century, but seems to reflect contact with Greek culture); Jonah (Persian or Hellenistic, no later than 2nd century BCE); Most of the individual psalms making up the final third of Psalms; Tobit (between 225 and 175 BCE); Book of Sirach (the first quarter of the 2nd century BCE, probably c. 175 BCE); Daniel (between 168 and 164 BCE)
Maccabean/Hasmonean; 164–63 BCE	1 Maccabees (between 146 and 129 BCE); Judith (between 150 and 100 BCE); 2 Maccabees (between 134 and 100 BCE); 3 Maccabees (between 100 BCE and 70 CE); Additions to Daniel and Additions to Esther; Wisdom of Solomon (c. late 1st century BCE–mid 1st century CE)
Roman after 63 BCE	3 Maccabees (between 100 BCE and 70 CE); Wisdom of Solomon (c. late 1st century BCE–1st century CE); 4 Maccabees (probably mid 1st century CE); New Testament (between c. 50–110 CE—see Table IV)

== Table II: Hebrew Bible/Christian Old Testament ==
Torah	Date or range of dates most widely held by scholars
Book of Genesis; Book of Exodus; Book of Leviticus; Book of Numbers; Book of Deuteronomy	The majority of modern biblical scholars believe that the Torah—Genesis, Exodus, Leviticus, Numbers and Deuteronomy—reached its present form in the post-Exilic period. The Documentary hypothesis model suggests that the five books are drawn from four "sources" (distinct schools of writers rather than individuals): the Priestly source, the Yahwist and the Elohist (these two are often referred to collectively as the "non-Priestly" source), and the Deuteronomist. There is general agreement that the Priestly source is post-exilic, but there is no agreement over the non-Priestly source(s).: Genesis is a post-exilic work combining "Priestly" and "non-Priestly" material.; Exodus is an anthology drawn from nearly all periods of Israel's history.; Leviticus is entirely Priestly and dates from the exilic/post-exilic period.; Numbers is a Priestly redaction of a Yahwistic/non-Priestly original.; Deuteronomy, now the last book of the Torah, began as the set of religious laws (these make up the bulk of the book), was extended in the early part of the 6th century BCE to serve as the introduction to the Deuteronomistic history, and later still was detached from that history, extended yet again, and edited to conclude the Torah.
Prophets	Date or range of dates most widely held by scholars
Former Prophets: Book of Joshua; Book of Judges; Books of Samuel; Books of Kings	This group of books, plus Deuteronomy, is called the "Deuteronomistic history" by scholars. The proposal that they made up a unified work was first advanced by Martin Noth in 1943, and has been widely accepted. Noth proposed that the entire history was the creation of a single individual working in the exilic period (6th century BCE); since then there has been wide recognition that the history appeared in two "editions", the first in the reign of Judah's King Josiah (late 7th century BCE), the second during the exile (6th century BCE). Noth's dating was based on the assumption that the history was completed very soon after its last recorded event, the release of King Jehoiachin in Babylon c. 560 BCE; but some scholars have termed his reasoning inadequate, and the history may have been further extended in the post-exilic period.
Three Major Prophets: Book of Isaiah; Book of Jeremiah; Book of Ezekiel	Scholars recognise three "sections" in the Book of Isaiah: Proto-Isaiah (the original 8th century BCE Isaiah); Deutero-Isaiah (an anonymous prophet living in Babylon during the exile); and; Trito-Isaiah (an anonymous author or authors in Jerusalem immediately after the exile).; The Book of Jeremiah exists in two versions: Greek (the version used in Orthodox Christian Bibles) and Hebrew (Jewish, Catholic, and Protestant Bibles), with the Greek representing the earlier version. The Greek version was probably finalised in the early Persian period and translated into Greek in the 3rd century BCE, and the Hebrew version dates from some point between then and the 2nd century BCE. The Book of Ezekiel describes itself as the words of the Ezekiel ben-Buzi, a priest living in exile in the city of Babylon, and internal evidence dates the visions to between 593 and 571 BCE. While the book probably reflects much of the historic Ezekiel, it is the product of a long and complex history, with significant additions by a "school" of later followers.
Twelve Minor Prophets	In the Hebrew Bible the Twelve Minor Prophets are a single collection edited in the Second Temple period, but the collection is broken up in Christian Bibles. With the exception of Jonah, which scholars regard as fictional, there exists an original core of prophetic tradition behind each book: Book of Hosea: second half of the 8th century BCE; Book of Joel: From late Persian or Hellenistic period; Book of Amos: first half of the 8th century BCE; Book of Obadiah: around the time of the fall of Jerusalem, 586 BCE; Book of Jonah: From Persian or Hellenistic period, no later than 2nd century BCE; Book of Micah: c. 750–700 BCE; Book of Nahum: an "oracle concerning Nineveh", the Assyrian city destroyed in 612 BCE; Book of Habakkuk: possibly shortly before the battle of Carchemish, 605 BCE; Book of Zephaniah: reign of Josiah; Book of Haggai: self-dated to the second year of the Persian king Darius (Darius the Great), 520 BCE; Book of Zechariah: first eight chapters contemporary with Haggai; chapters 9–14 from the 4-3rd centuries BCE; Book of Malachi: 5th century BCE, contemporaneous or immediately prior to the missions of Nehemiah and Ezra (which, however, are themselves difficult to date)
Writings	Date or range of dates most widely held by scholars
Wisdom collection: Job; Ecclesiastes; Proverbs	The books of Job, Ecclesiastes, and Proverbs share a similar outlook which they themselves call "wisdom". It is generally agreed that Job comes from between the 6th and 4th centuries BCE. Ecclesiastes can be no earlier than about 450 BCE, due to the presence of Persian loan-words and Aramaic idioms, and no later than 180 BCE, when the Jewish writer Ben Sira quotes from it in the Book of Sirach. Proverbs is a "collection of collections" relating to a pattern of life which lasted for more than a millennium, and impossible to date.
Poetic works: Psalms; Lamentations	The psalms making up the first two-thirds of the psalter are predominantly pre-exilic and the last third predominantly post-exilic. The collected book of Psalms was possibly given its modern shape and division into five parts in the post-exilic period, although it continued to be revised and expanded well into Hellenistic and even Roman times. It is generally accepted that the destruction of Jerusalem by Babylon in 586 BCE forms the background to the Book of Lamentations.
Histories: Chronicles; Ezra–Nehemiah	Chronicles was composed between 400 and 250 BCE, probably in the period 350–300 BCE; Ezra–Nehemiah (two books in modern Bibles, but originally one) may have reached its final form as late as the Ptolemaic period, c. 300–200 BCE.
Miscellaneous works: Ruth; Esther; Daniel; Song of Songs	The Book of Ruth is commonly dated to the Persian period. Esther to the 3rd or 4th centuries BCE; the Book of Daniel can be dated more precisely to 164 BCE thanks to its veiled prophecy of the death of a Greek king of Syria; and the Song of Songs could have been composed at any time after the 6th century BCE.

== Table III: Deuterocanonical Old Testament ==
Book	Date or range of dates most widely held by scholars
Tobit	225–175 BCE, on the basis of apparent use of language and references common to the post-exilic period, but lack of knowledge of the 2nd century BCE persecution of Jews.
Judith	150–100 BCE, although estimates range from the 5th century BCE to the 2nd century CE.
1 Maccabees	100 BCE
2 Maccabees	c. 100 BCE
3 Maccabees	100–75 BCE "very probable"
4 Maccabees	mid-1st century CE
Wisdom of Solomon	late 1st century BCE/early 1st century CE, on the basis of shared outlook with other works dating from this time.
Sirach	196–175 BCE, as the author implies that Simon the high priest had died (196 BCE), but shows no knowledge of the persecution of the Jews that began after 175 BCE.
Additions to Daniel	Prayer of Azariah (Song of the Three Holy Children); Bel and the Dragon: late 6th century BCE; Susanna and the Elders: possibly 95–80 BCE
Baruch and Letter of Jeremiah	2nd century BCE, as Baruch uses Sirach (written c. 180 BCE) and is in turn used by the Psalms of Solomon (mid-1st century BCE). The Letter of Jeremiah, Chapter 6 of the Book of Baruch, is sometimes considered a separate book.

== Table IV: New Testament ==
Book	Date or range of dates most widely held by scholars	Earliest known fragment
Gospel of Matthew	c. 80–90 CE. This is based on three strands of evidence: (a) the setting of Matthew reflects the final separation of Church and Synagogue, about 85 CE; (b) it reflects the capture of Jerusalem and destruction of the Second Temple by the Romans in 70 CE; (c) it uses Mark, usually dated around 70 CE, as a source.	𝔓^{104} (2nd century CE)
Gospel of Mark	c. 65–73 CE. References to persecution and to war in Judea suggest that its context was either Nero's persecution of the Christians in Rome or the Jewish revolt.	𝔓^{45} (250 CE)
Gospel of Luke	c. 80–90 CE. Text indicates composition a generation after that of the first disciples, uses Gospel of Mark, and appears to address concerns raised by the destruction of the Temple in 70 CE.	𝔓^{4}, 𝔓^{75} (175–250 CE)
Gospel of John	c. 90–100 CE, the upper date based on textual evidence that the gospel was known in the early 2nd century CE, and the lower on an internal reference to the expulsion of Christians from the synagogues.	𝔓^{52} (125–175 CE)
Acts	c. 80–90 CE, on the grounds that Luke–Acts uses Mark as a source, looks back on the destruction of Jerusalem, and does not show any awareness of the letters of Paul (which began circulating late in the century); if, however, it does show awareness of the letters of Paul and also of the works of Josephus, then a date early in the 2nd century CE is more likely.	𝔓^{29}, 𝔓^{45}, 𝔓^{48}, 𝔓^{53}, 𝔓^{91} (250 CE)
Romans	c. 57–58 CE. One of the indisputably genuine Pauline letters, written to the Romans as Paul was about to leave Asia Minor and Greece, and expressing his hopes to continue his work in Spain.	𝔓^{46} (mid 2nd century to mid 3rd century CE)
1 Corinthians	c. 53–57 CE. One of the indisputably genuine Pauline letters. Paul expresses his intention to re-visit the church he founded in the city c. 50–52 CE.	𝔓^{46} (late 2nd century or 3rd century CE)
2 Corinthians	c. 55–58 CE. One of the indisputably genuine Pauline letters. Written by Paul in Macedonia after having left Ephesus.	𝔓^{46} (late 2nd century or 3rd century CE)
Galatians	c. 48 or 55 CE. One of the indisputably genuine Pauline letters. The dating of this letter depends on whether it was written to the northern or southern portion of Galatia (with the former representing the later date).	𝔓^{46} (late 2nd century or 3rd century CE)
Ephesians	c. 80–90 CE. The letter appears to have been written after Paul's death in Rome, by an author who uses his name.	𝔓^{46} (late 2nd century or 3rd century CE)
Philippians	c. 54–55 CE. A genuine Pauline letter, it mentions "Caesar's household," leading some scholars to believe that it is written from Rome, but some of the news in it could not have come from Rome. It seems rather to date from an earlier imprisonment, perhaps in Ephesus, from which Paul hopes to be released.	𝔓^{46} (late 2nd century or 3rd century CE)
Colossians	c. 62 CE or post-70 CE. Some scholars believe Colossians dates from late in Paul's career, around the time of his imprisonment in Rome. However, some of the language and theology point to a much later date, from an unknown author using Paul's name.	𝔓^{46} (late 2nd century or 3rd century CE)
1 Thessalonians	c. 51 CE. One of the earliest of the genuine Pauline epistles.	𝔓^{46} (late 2nd century or 3rd century CE)
2 Thessalonians	c. 51 CE or post-70 CE. If this is a genuine Pauline epistle it follows closely on 1 Thessalonians. But some of the language and theology point to a much later date, from an unknown author using Paul's name.	𝔓^{92} (300 CE)
1 Timothy, 2 Timothy, Epistle to Titus	c. 100 CE. The two Timothy epistles and Titus reflect a much more developed Church organization than that reflected in the undisputed Pauline epistles.	Codex Sinaiticus (350 CE)𝔓^{32} (200 CE)
Philemon	c. 54–55 CE. A genuine Pauline epistle, written from an imprisonment (probably in Ephesus) that Paul expects will soon be over.	𝔓^{87} (3rd century CE)
Hebrews	c. 80–90 CE. The elegance of the Greek and the sophistication of the theology do not fit the genuine Pauline epistles, but the mention of Timothy in the conclusion led to its being included with the Pauline group from an early date.	𝔓^{46} (late 2nd century or 3rd century CE)
James	c. 65–85 CE. Like Hebrews, James is not so much a letter as an exhortation; the style of the Greek makes it unlikely that it was actually written by James the brother of Jesus.	𝔓^{20}, 𝔓^{23} (early 3rd century CE)
First Peter	c. 75–90 CE	𝔓^{72} (3rd/4th century CE)
Second Peter	c. 110 CE. This is apparently the latest writing in the New Testament, quoting from Jude, assuming a knowledge of the Pauline letters, and including a reference to the gospel story of the Transfiguration of Christ.	𝔓^{72} (3rd/4th century CE)
Epistles of John	c. 90–110 CE. The letters give no clear indication, but scholars tend to place them about a decade after the Gospel of John.	𝔓^{9}, Uncial 0232, Codex Sinaiticus (3rd/4th century CE)
Jude	Uncertain. The references to "brother of James" and to "what the apostles of our Lord Jesus Christ foretold" suggest that it was written after the apostolic letters were in circulation, but before 2 Peter, which uses it.	𝔓^{72} (3rd/4th century CE)
Revelation	c. 95 CE. The date is suggested by clues in the visions pointing to the reign of the emperor Domitian.	𝔓^{98} (150–200 CE)

== See also ==
- Apocalyptic literature
- Authorship of the Bible
- Authorship of the Johannine works
- Authorship of the Pauline epistles
- Authorship of the Petrine epistles
- Biblical apocrypha
- Biblical canon
- Categories of New Testament manuscripts
- Deuterocanonical books
- Development of the Hebrew Bible canon
- Development of the New Testament canon
- Development of the Old Testament canon
- Historical criticism
- Historicity of the Bible
- Jewish apocrypha
- List of Old Testament pseudepigrapha
- Mosaic authorship
- New Testament apocrypha
- Protocanonical books
- Pseudepigrapha
