= Papyrus 30 =

Papyrus 𝔓^{30}
- New Testament manuscript
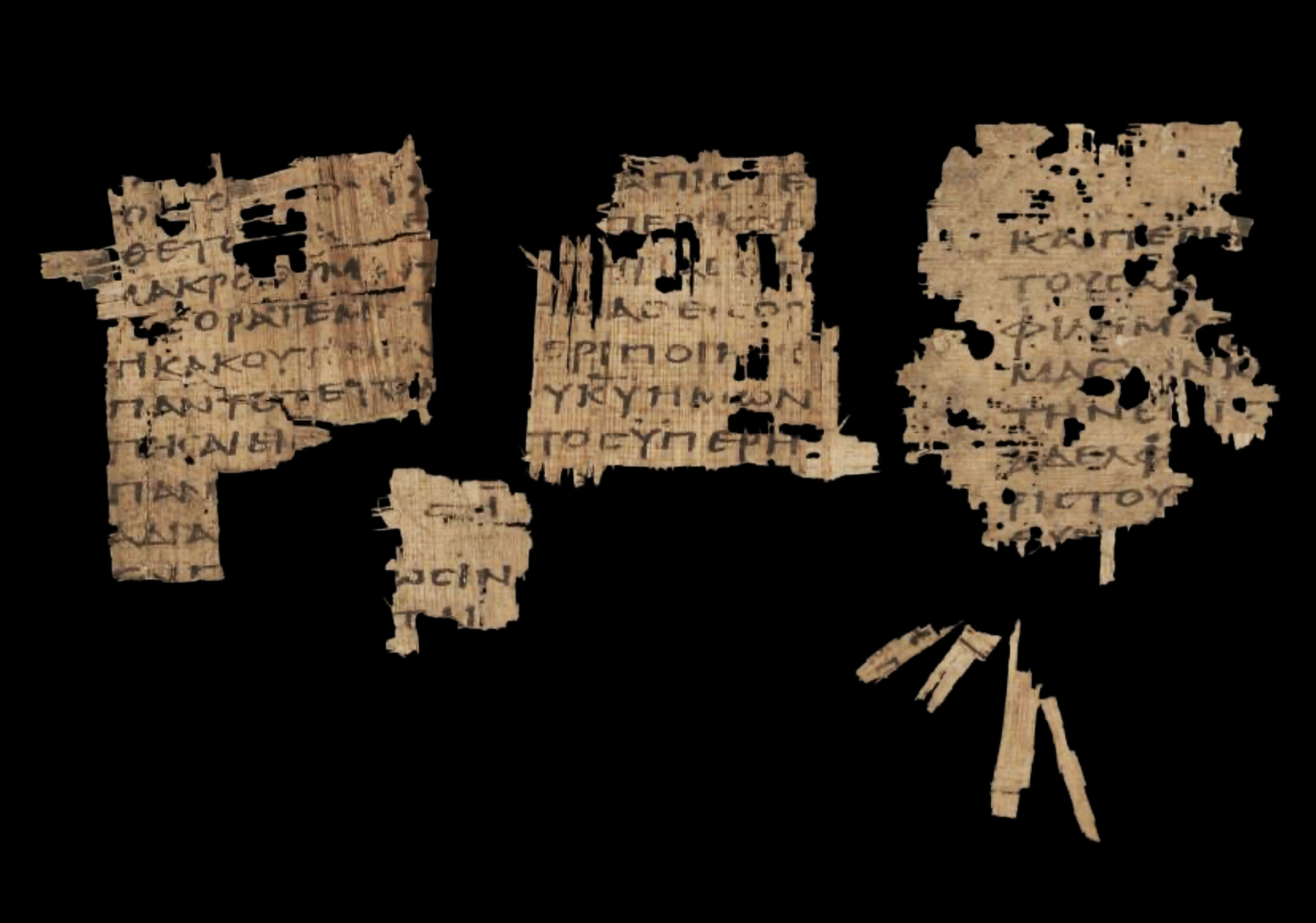
- Recto 1 Thess 5:3; 5:8-10; 5:14-18; 5:26-28
- Name: P. Oxy. 1598
- Text: 1 Thess 4-5 †; 2 Thess 1-2 †
- Date: 3rd century
- Script: Greek
- Found: Egypt
- Now at: Ghent University
- Cite: B. P. Grenfell & A. S. Hunt, Oxyrynchus Papyri XIII, (London 1919), pp. 12-14
- Size: 16 x 12 cm
- Type: Alexandrian text-type
- Category: I

Papyrus 30 (in the Gregory-Aland numbering), designated by 𝔓^{30}, is an early copy of the New Testament in Greek. It is a papyrus manuscript of the Pauline epistles, it contains only 1 Thess 4:12-5:18. 25-28; 2 Thess 1:1-2; 2:1.9-11. The manuscript paleographically has been assigned to the 3rd century.

== Description ==
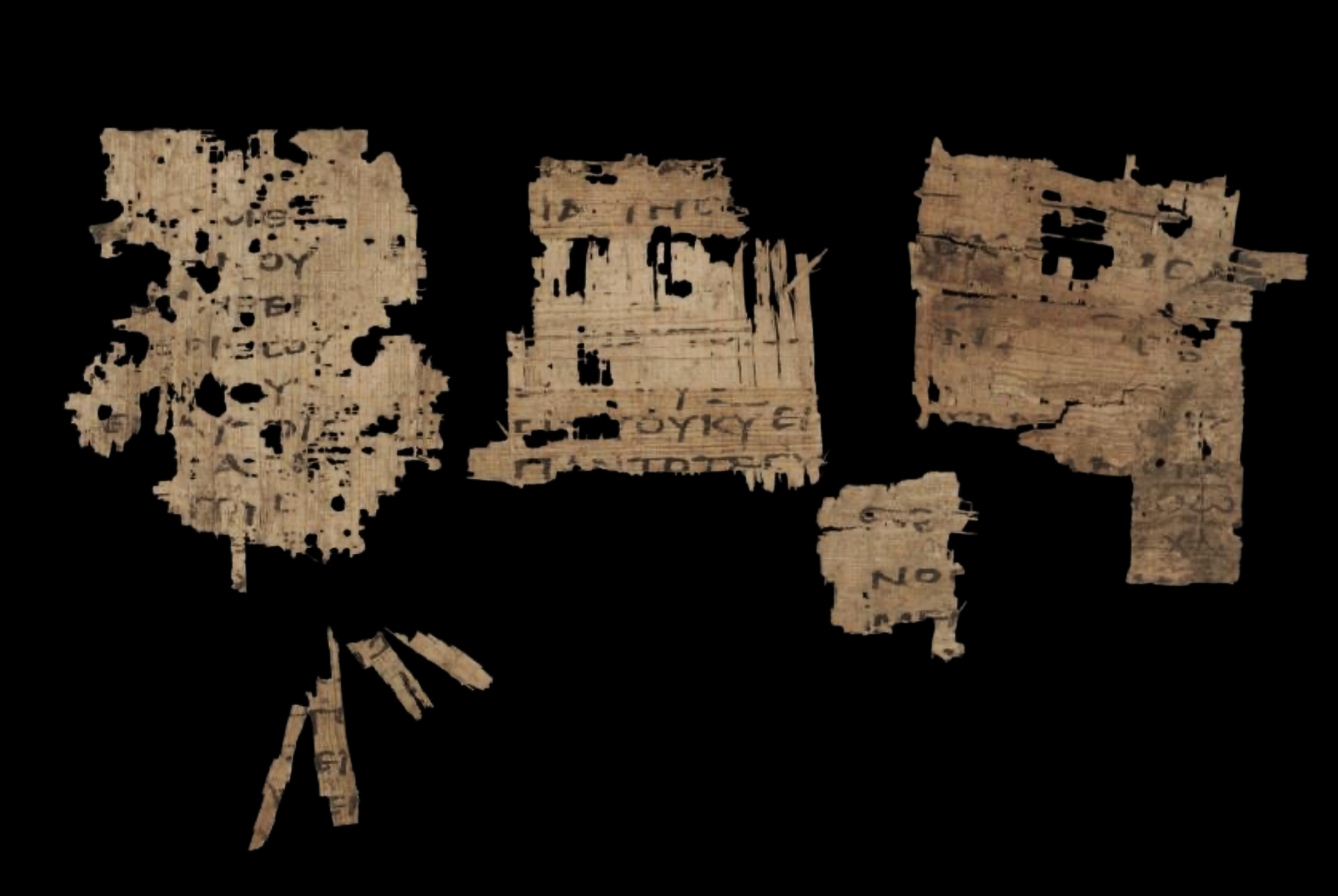
Verso 1 Thess 4:12-13; 4:16-17; 5:12-14; 2 Thess 1:1-2

The manuscript is written in large uncial letters. The nomina sacra are abbreviated. The number of the pages suggest that the manuscript was a collection of the Pauline epistles. It is a carefully executed manuscript.

The Greek text of this codex is a representative of the Alexandrian text-type (rather proto-Alexandrian). Aland placed it in Category I. According to Comfort this manuscript shows greater agreement with Codex Sinaiticus than with Vaticanus (in 11 out of 13 variants).

According to Grenfell it agrees four times with B against א A, once with BA against א, twice with א A against B, once with א against B A.

According to Comfort it was written in the early 3rd century.

It is currently housed at the Ghent University (Inv. 61) in Ghent.

== See also ==
- 1 Thessalonians 5
- List of New Testament papyri
