= Papyrus 48 =

Papyrus 𝔓^{48}
- New Testament manuscript
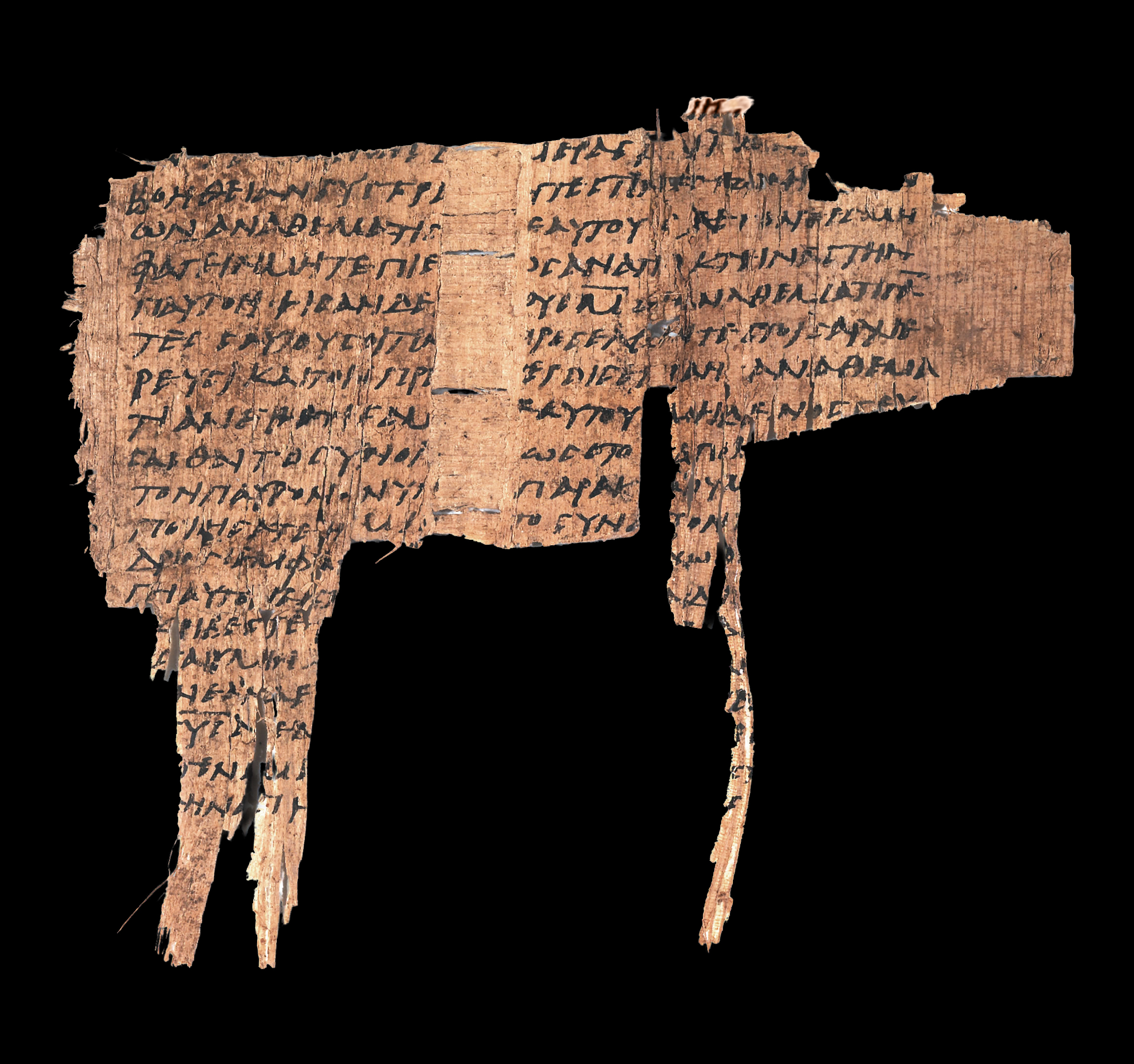
- Recto Acts 23:25-29
- Text: Acts of the Apostles 23 †
- Date: 3rd century
- Script: Greek
- Found: Egypt
- Now at: Laurentian Library
- Cite: G. Vitelli and S. G. Mercati, PGLSI X, (1932), pp. 112-118.
- Size: 16 x 25 cm
- Type: Western text-type
- Category: IV

Papyrus 48 (Gregory-Aland), signed by 𝔓^{48}, is an early copy of a part of the New Testament in Greek. It is a papyrus manuscript of the Acts of the Apostles, it contains portions of Acts 23:11-29. The manuscript paleographically has been assigned to the 3rd century.

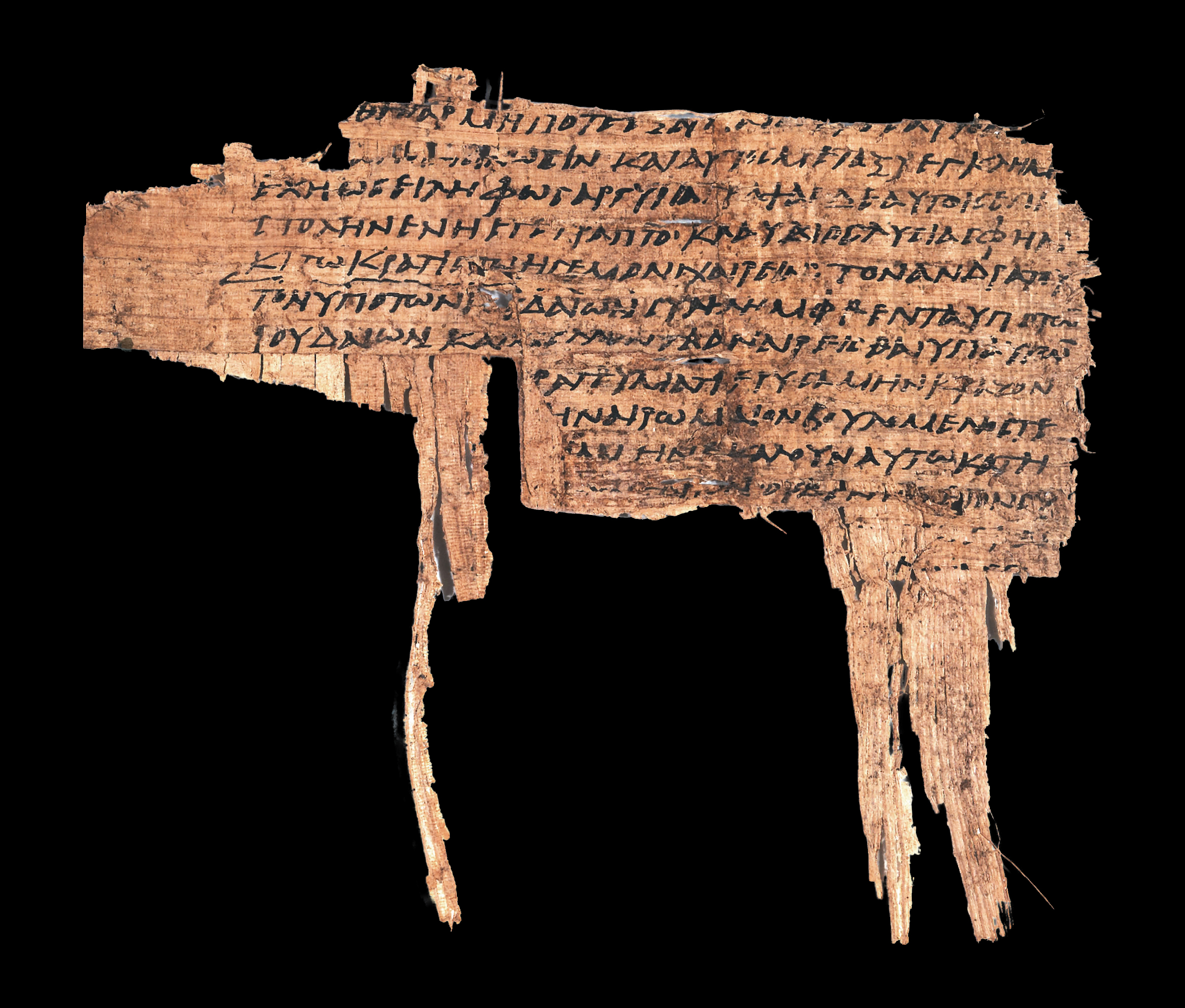
Verso Acts 23:11-17

Although the text of this codex is extremely small, the Greek text of this codex has been called a representative of the Western text-type. Aland placed it in Category IV.

It is currently housed at the Laurentian Library (PSI 1165) in Florence.

== See also ==
- List of New Testament papyri
