= Biblical manuscript =

Handwritten copy of a portion of the Bible

A biblical manuscript is any handwritten copy of a portion of the text of the Bible. Biblical manuscripts vary in size from tiny scrolls containing individual verses of the Jewish scriptures (see Tefillin) to huge polyglot codices (multi-lingual books) containing both the Hebrew Bible (Tanakh) and the New Testament, as well as extracanonical works.

The study of biblical manuscripts is important because handwritten copies of books can contain errors. Textual criticism attempts to reconstruct the original text of books, especially those published prior to the invention of the printing press.

== Hebrew Bible (or Tanakh) manuscripts ==
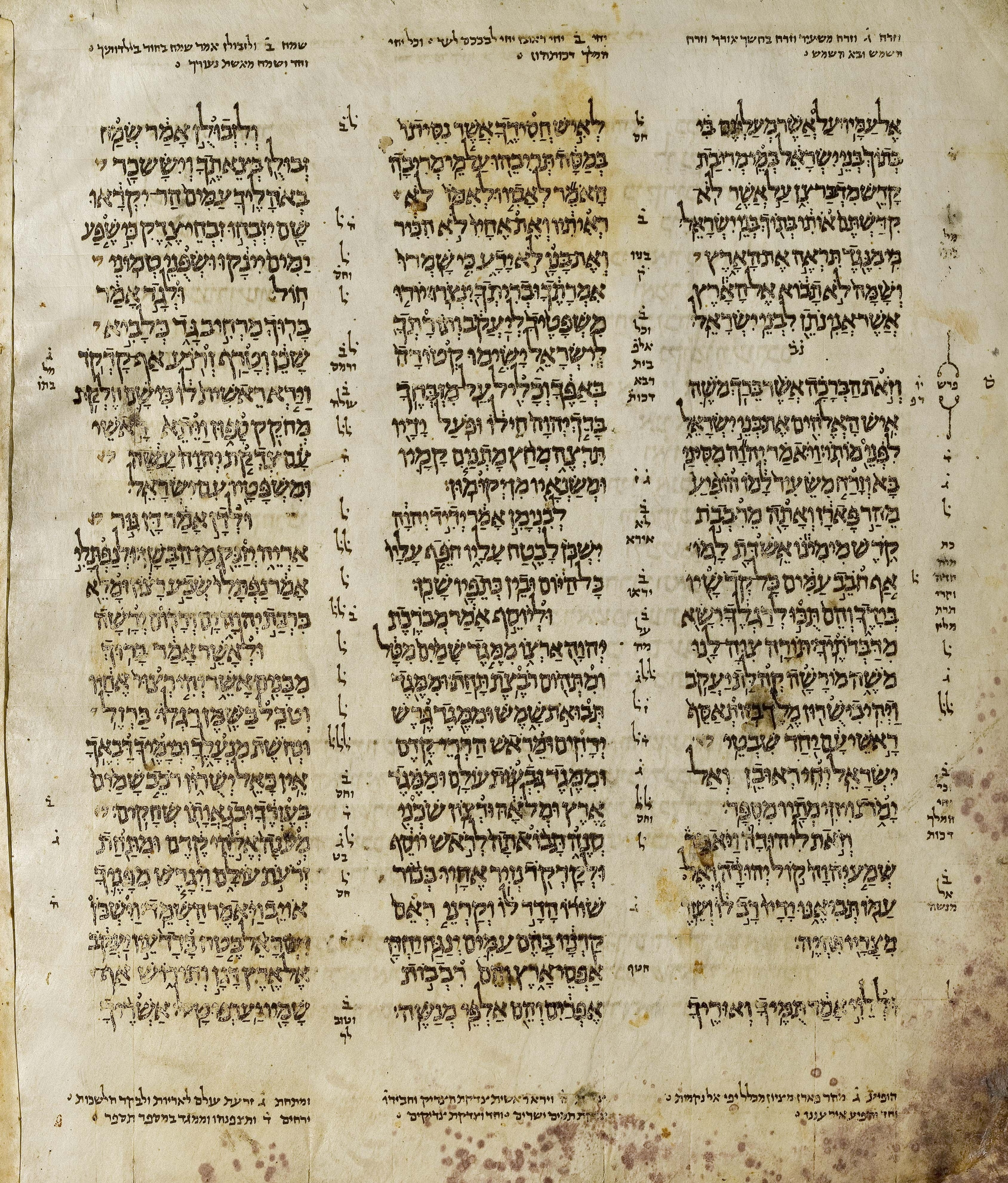
A page from the Aleppo Codex, Deuteronomy

The Aleppo Codex (c. 920 CE) and Leningrad Codex (c. 1008 CE) were once the oldest known manuscripts of the Tanakh in Hebrew. In 1947, the finding of the Dead Sea Scrolls at Qumran pushed the manuscript history of the Tanakh back a millennium from such codices. Before this discovery, the earliest extant manuscripts of the Old Testament were in Greek, in manuscripts such as the Codex Vaticanus and Codex Sinaiticus. Out of the roughly 800 manuscripts found at Qumran, 220 are from the Tanakh. Every book of the Tanakh is represented except for the Book of Esther; however, most are fragmentary. Notably, there are two scrolls of the Book of Isaiah, one complete (1QIs^{a}), and one around 75% complete (1QIs^{b}). These manuscripts generally date between 150 BCE to 70 CE.

=== Extant Tanakh manuscripts ===
Version	Examples	Language	Date of Composition	Oldest Copy
Ketef Hinnom scrolls		Hebrew written in the Paleo-Hebrew alphabet	c. 650–587 BCE	c. 650–587 BCE (amulets with the Priestly Blessing recorded in the Book of Numbers)
Dead Sea Scrolls		Hebrew, Aramaic, and Greek	c. 250 BCE – 70 CE	c. 250 BCE – 70 CE (fragments)
Septuagint	Codex Vaticanus, Codex Sinaiticus and other earlier papyri	Greek	300–100 BCE	2nd century BCE (fragments); 4th century CE (complete)
Peshitta		Syriac		early 5th century CE
Vulgate	Codex Amiatinus	Latin		early 5th century CE early 8th century CE (complete)
Masoretic	Aleppo Codex, Leningrad Codex and other, incomplete MSS (Note: A manuscript is abbreviated MS for singular and MSS for plural.)	Hebrew	c. 100 CE	10th century CE (complete)
Samaritan Pentateuch		Hebrew	200–100 BCE	Oldest extant MSS, c. 11th century CE; oldest MSS available to scholars, 16th century CE
Targum		Aramaic	500–1000 CE	5th century CE
Coptic	Crosby-Schøyen Codex, British Library MS. Oriental 7594	Coptic		3rd or 4th century CE

== New Testament manuscripts ==
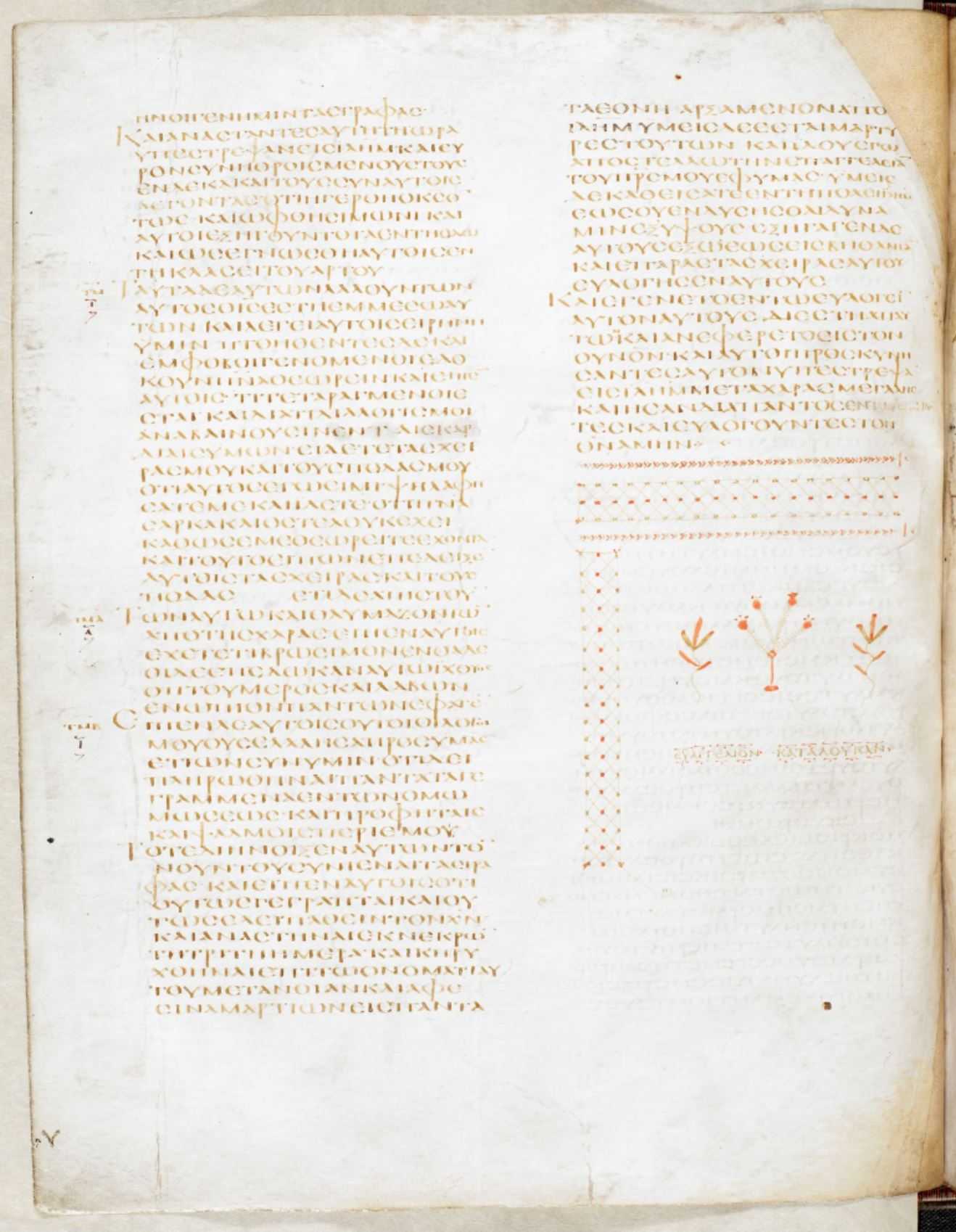
Folio 41v from Codex Alexandrinus contains the Gospel of Luke with decorative tailpiece.

For the New Testament, the dates of most manuscripts range from c. 125 (the 𝔓^{52} papyrus, oldest copy of John fragment) to the introduction of printing in Germany in the 15th century.

Often, especially in monasteries, a manuscript cache was little more than a former manuscript recycling centre, where imperfect and incomplete copies of manuscripts were stored while the monastery or scriptorium decided what to do with them. There were several options. The first was to simply "wash" the manuscript and reuse it. Such reused manuscripts were called palimpsests and were very common in the ancient world until the Middle Ages. One notable palimpsest is the Archimedes Palimpsest. When washing was no longer an option, the second choice was burning. Since the manuscripts contained the words of Christ, they were thought to have had a level of sanctity; burning them was considered more reverent than simply throwing them into a garbage pit, which occasionally happened (as in the case of Oxyrhynchus 840). The third option was to leave them in what has become known as a manuscript gravesite. When scholars come across manuscript caches, such as at Saint Catherine's Monastery in the Sinai (the source of the Codex Sinaiticus), or Saint Sabbas Monastery outside Bethlehem, they are finding not libraries but storehouses of rejected texts sometimes kept in boxes or back shelves in libraries due to space constraints. The texts were unacceptable because of their scribal errors and contain corrections inside the lines, possibly evidence that monastery scribes compared them to a master text. In addition, texts thought to be complete and correct but that had deteriorated from heavy usage or had missing folios would also be placed in the caches. Once in a cache, insects and humidity would often contribute to the continued deterioration of the documents.

Complete and correctly copied texts would usually be immediately placed in use and so wore out fairly quickly, which required frequent recopying. Manuscript copying was very costly when it required a scribe's attention for extended periods so a manuscript might be made only when it was commissioned. The size of the parchment, script used, any illustrations (thus raising the effective cost) and whether it was one book or a collection of several would be determined by the one commissioning the work. Stocking extra copies would likely have been considered wasteful and unnecessary since the form and the presentation of a manuscript were typically customized to the aesthetic tastes of the buyer.

Distribution of Greek manuscripts by century
	New Testament manuscripts			Lectionaries	
Century	Papyri	Uncials	Minuscules	Uncials	Minuscules
2nd	2	-	-	-	-
2nd/3rd	5	1	-	-	-
3rd	28	2	-	-	-
3rd/4th	8	2	-	-	-
4th	14	14	-	1	-
4th/5th	8	8	-	-	-
5th	2	36	-	1	-
5th/6th	4	10	-	-	-
6th	7	51	-	3	-
6th/7th	5	5	-	1	-
7th	8	28	-	4	-
7th/8th	3	4	-	-	-
8th	2	29	-	22	-
8th/9th	-	4	-	5	-
9th	-	53	13	113	5
9th/10th	-	1	4	-	1
10th	-	17	124	108	38
10th/11th	-	3	8	3	4
11th	-	1	429	15	227
11th/12th	-	-	33	-	13
12th	-	-	555	6	486
12th/13th	-	-	26	-	17
13th	-	-	547	4	394
13th/14th	-	-	28	-	17
14th	-	-	511	-	308
14th/15th	-	-	8	-	2
15th	-	-	241	-	171
15th/16th	-	-	4	-	2
16th	-	-	136	-	194
Total	94	269	2667	286	1879

=== Transmission ===
The task of copying manuscripts was generally done by scribes who were trained professionals in the arts of writing and bookmaking. Scribes would work in difficult conditions, for up to 48 hours a week, with little pay beyond room and board. Some manuscripts were also proofread, and scholars closely examining a text can sometimes find the original and corrections found in certain manuscripts. In the 6th century, a special room devoted to the practice of manuscript writing and illumination called the scriptorium came into use, typically inside medieval European monasteries. Sometimes a group of scribes would make copies at the same time as one individual read from the text.

=== Manuscript construction ===
An important issue with manuscripts is preservation. The earliest New Testament manuscripts were written on papyrus, made from a reed that grew abundantly in the Nile Delta. This tradition continued as late as the 8th century. Papyrus eventually becomes brittle and deteriorates with age. The dry climate of Egypt allowed some papyrus manuscripts to be partially preserved, but, with the exception of 𝔓^{72}, no New Testament papyrus manuscript is complete; many consist only of a single fragmented page. Beginning in the 4th century, parchment (also called vellum) began to be a common medium for New Testament manuscripts. It wasn't until the 12th century that paper (made from cotton or plant fibers) began to gain popularity in biblical manuscripts.

Of the 476 non-Christian manuscripts dated to the 2nd century, 97% of the manuscripts are in the form of scrolls; however, eight Christian manuscripts are codices. In fact, virtually all New Testament manuscripts are codices. The adaptation of the codex form in non-Christian text did not become dominant until the 4th and 5th centuries, showing a preference for that form amongst early Christians. The considerable length of some New Testament books (such as the Pauline epistles), and the New Testament itself, was not suited to the limited space available on a single scroll; in contrast a codex could be expanded to hundreds of pages. On its own, however, length alone is an insufficient reason – after all, the Jewish scriptures would continue to be transmitted on scrolls for centuries to come. Scholars have argued that the codex was adopted as a product of the formation of the New Testament canon, allowing for specific collections of documents like the Gospels and the Pauline Epistles. "Canon and codex go hand in hand in the sense that the adoption of a fixed canon could be more easily controlled and promulgated when the codex was the means of gathering together originally separate compositions." A manuscript volume containing all the books of the Bible is called a pandect.

=== Script and other features ===
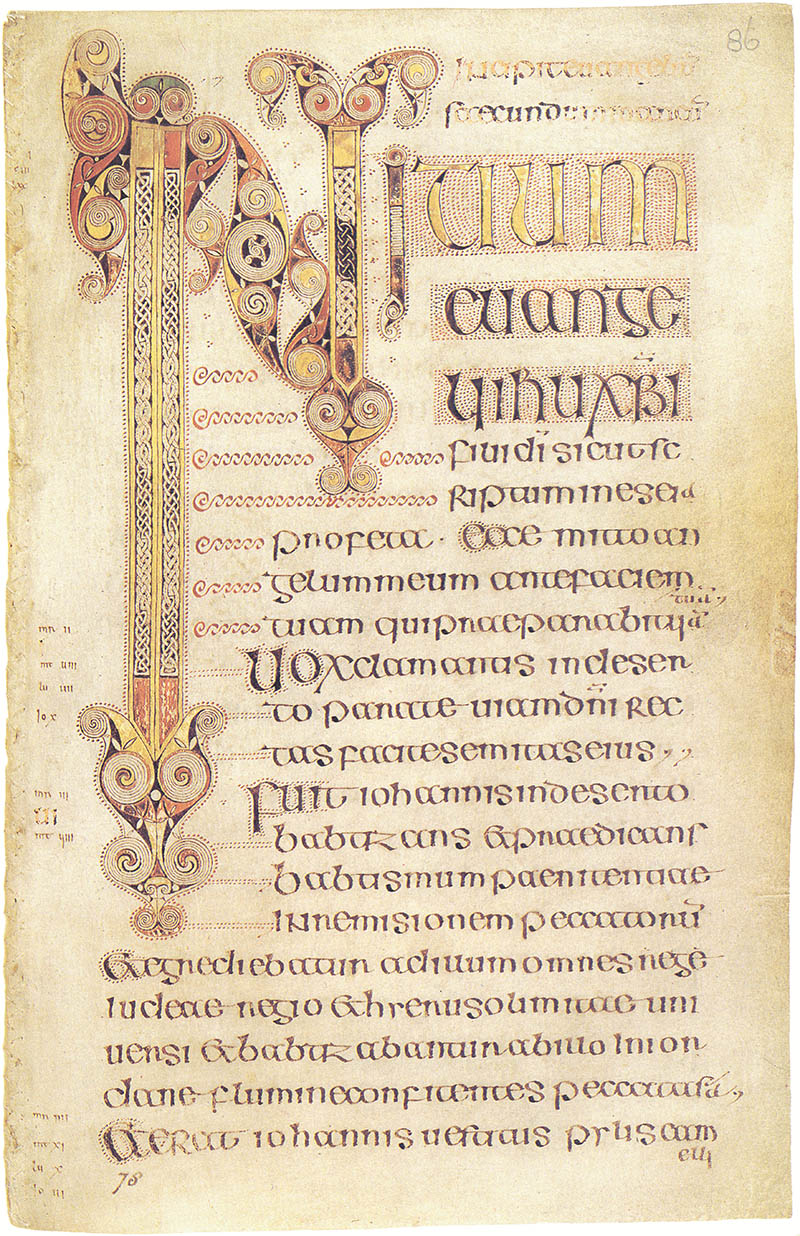
The beginning of the Gospel of Mark from the Book of Durrow

The handwriting found in New Testament manuscripts varies. One way of classifying handwriting is by formality: book-hand vs. cursive. More formal, literary Greek works were often written in a distinctive style of even, capital letters called book-hand. Less formal writing consisted of cursive letters which could be written quickly. Another way of dividing handwriting is between uncial script (or majuscule) and minuscule. The uncial letters were a consistent height between the baseline and the cap height, while the minuscule letters had ascenders and descenders that moved past the baseline and cap height. Generally speaking, the majuscules are earlier than the minuscules, with a dividing line roughly in the 11th century.

The earliest manuscripts had negligible punctuation and breathing marks. The manuscripts also lacked word spacing, so words, sentences, and paragraphs would be a continuous string of letters (scriptio continua), often with line breaks in the middle of words. Bookmaking was an expensive endeavor, and one way to reduce the number of pages used was to save space. Another method employed was to abbreviate frequent words, such as the nomina sacra. Yet another method involved the palimpsest, a manuscript which recycled an older manuscript. Scholars using careful examination can sometimes determine what was originally written on the material of a document before it was erased to make way for a new text (for example Codex Ephraemi Rescriptus and the Syriac Sinaiticus).

The original New Testament books did not have section headings or verse and chapter divisions. These were developed over the years as "helps for readers". The Eusebian Canons were an early system of division written in the margin of many manuscripts. The Eusebian Canons are a series of tables that grouped parallel stories among the gospels. Starting in the 5th century, subject headings (κεφαλαία) were used.

Manuscripts became more ornate over the centuries, which developed into a rich illuminated manuscript tradition, including the famous Irish Gospel Books, the Book of Kells and the Book of Durrow.

=== Cataloging ===
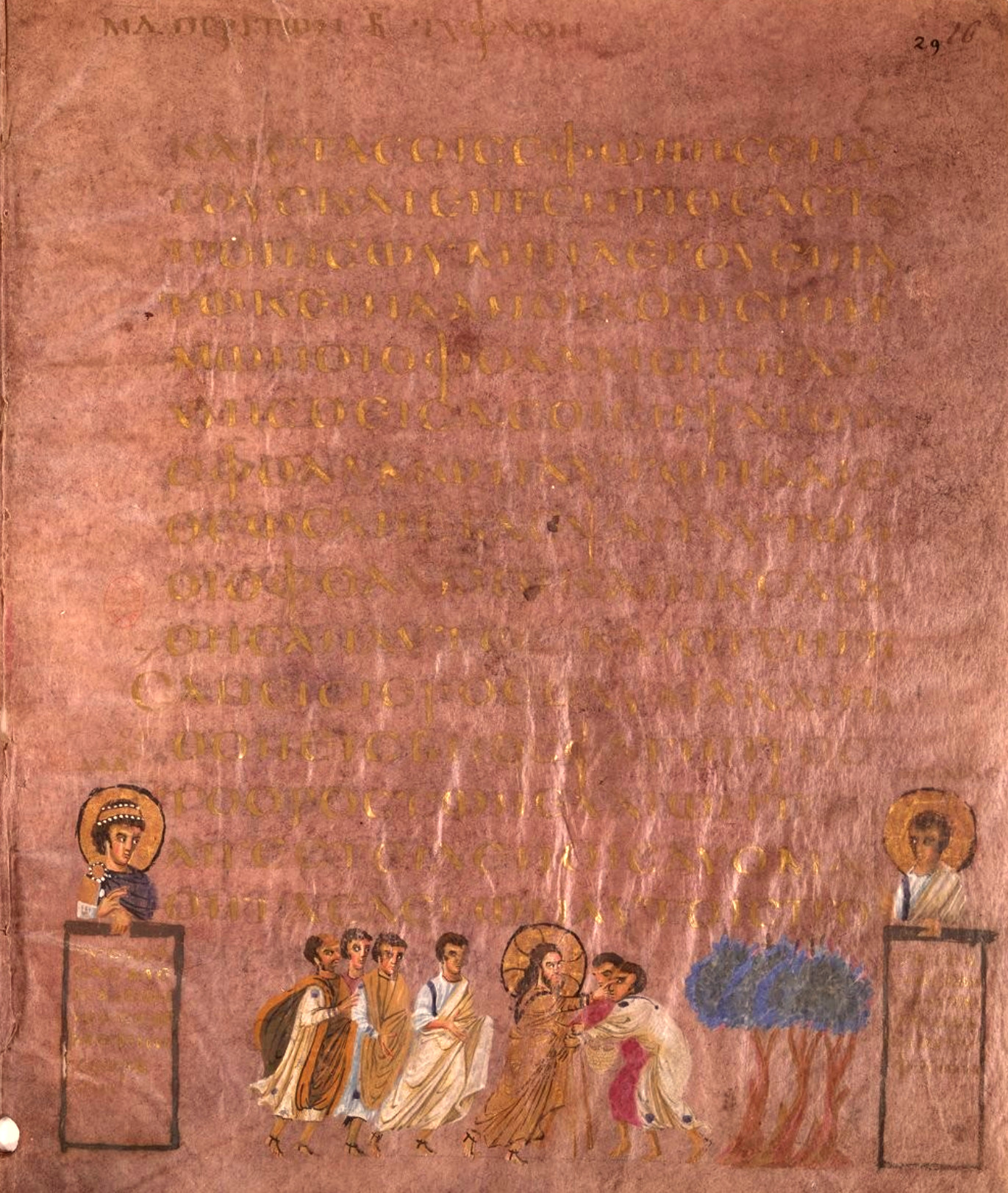
A page from the Sinope Gospels. The miniature at the bottom shows Jesus healing the blind.

Desiderius Erasmus compiled the first published edition of the Greek New Testament in 1516, basing his work on several manuscripts because he did not have a single complete work and because each manuscript had small errors. In the 18th century, Johann Jakob Wettstein was one of the first biblical scholars to start cataloging biblical manuscripts. He divided the manuscripts based on the writing used (uncial, minuscule) or format (lectionaries) and based on content (Gospels, Pauline letters, Acts + General epistles, and Revelation). He assigned the uncials letters and minuscules and lectionaries numbers for each grouping of content, which resulted in manuscripts being assigned the same letter or number.

For manuscripts that contained the whole New Testament, such as Codex Alexandrinus (A) and Codex Ephraemi Rescriptus (C), the letters corresponded across content groupings. For significant early manuscripts such as Codex Vaticanus Graecus 1209 (B), which did not contain Revelation, the letter B was also assigned to a later 10th-century manuscript of Revelation, thus creating confusion. Constantin von Tischendorf found one of the earliest, nearly complete copies of the Bible, Codex Sinaiticus, over a century after Wettstein's cataloging system was introduced. Because he felt the manuscript was so important, Von Tischendorf assigned it the Hebrew letter aleph (א). Eventually enough uncials were found that all the letters in the Latin alphabet had been used, and scholars moved on to first the Greek alphabet, and eventually started reusing characters by adding a superscript. Confusion also existed in the minuscules, where up to seven different manuscripts could have the same number or a single manuscript of the complete New Testament could have 4 different numbers to describe the different content groupings.

==== Soden ====
Hermann von Soden published a complex cataloging system for manuscripts in 1902–1910. His grouping of the manuscripts was based on their content, and he assigned them a Greek prefix: δ for the complete New Testament, ε for the Gospels, and α for the remaining parts. This grouping was flawed, because some manuscripts grouped in δ did not contain Revelation, and many manuscripts grouped in α contained either the general epistles or the Pauline epistles, but not both. After the Greek prefix, Soden assigned a numeral that roughly corresponded to a date (for example δ1–δ49 were from before the 10th century, δ150–δ249 for the 11th century). This system proved to be problematic when manuscripts were re-dated, or when more manuscripts were discovered than the number of spaces allocated to a certain century.

==== Gregory–Aland ====
Caspar René Gregory published another cataloging system in 1908 in Die griechischen Handschriften des Neuen Testaments, which is the system still in use today. Gregory divided the manuscripts into four groupings: papyri, uncials, minuscules, and lectionaries. This division is partially arbitrary. The first grouping is based on the physical material (papyrus) used in the manuscripts. The second two divisions are based on script: uncial and minuscule. The last grouping is based on content: lectionary. Most of the papyrus manuscripts and the lectionaries before the year 1000 are written in uncial script. There is some consistency in that the majority of the papyri are very early because parchment began to replace papyrus in the 4th century (although the latest papyri date to the 8th century). Similarly, the majority of the uncials date to before the 11th century, and the majority of the minuscules to after.

Gregory assigned the papyri a prefix of P, often written in blackletter script (𝔓^{n}), with a superscript numeral. The uncials were given a prefix of the number 0, and the established letters for the major manuscripts were retained for redundancy (e.g. Codex Claromontanus is assigned both 06 and D). The minuscules were given plain numbers, and the lectionaries were prefixed with l often written in script (ℓ). Kurt Aland continued Gregory's cataloging work through the 1950s and beyond. Because of this, the numbering system is often referred to as "Gregory-Aland numbers". The most recent manuscripts added to each grouping are 𝔓^{131}, 0323, 2928, and ℓ 2463. Due to the cataloging heritage and because some manuscripts which were initially numbered separately were discovered to be from the same codex, there is some redundancy in the list (i.e. the Magdalen papyrus has both the numbers of 𝔓^{64} and 𝔓^{67}).

The majority of New Testament textual criticism deals with Greek manuscripts because the scholarly opinion is that the original books of the New Testament were written in Greek. The text of the New Testament is also found both translated in manuscripts of many different languages (called versions) and quoted in manuscripts of the writings of the Church Fathers. In the critical apparatus of the Novum Testamentum Graece, a series of abbreviations and prefixes designate different language versions and families:

== New Testament Sigla Legend ==
This is a guide to the sigla (symbols and abbreviations) most frequently used in citations of source material for a Greek New Testament (NT) manuscript. Editors of a scholarly critical text of the NT use each siglum to shrink the space needed for listing witnesses to a particular reading in the critical apparatus. The intended reader, a Bible translator, scholar, orator, or student, needs to know these abbreviations, e.g. for deciding whether to use alternative readings of the critical text or to understand the origin and attestation of a particular passage.

A manuscript may have a Gregory–Aland index number because it is a Greek minuscule (see list). However, if the number has a leading 0, it is a Greek uncial (see list) using the older majuscule script.

Besides these sigla and annotations, scholars often abbreviate other words and phrases after the manner of A Plain Introduction to the Criticism of the New Testament by Scrivener, which began a formalized system of collation, cataloguing, and jargon for NT textual critics in 1861.

General sigla and abbreviations

# beginning with 0: uncial
# not beginning with 0: minuscule
(), parenthesized: indirect or partial support or a reading or witness with a slight difference
^{*} superscript: original reading
^{app} superscript: the critical apparatus reading
^{c} superscript: scribal correction
^{com} superscript: Biblical commentary reading
^{1,2,3...} superscripts: 1st, 2nd, 3rd... scribal corrections
^{v.l.} superscript: varia lectio, i.e. alternative reading
^{mg} superscript: reading in the margin
^{ms} superscript: individual manuscript
^{mss} superscript: multiple manuscripts
^{pt} superscript: partial attestation
^{s} superscript: reading in a supplement to the text
^{txt} superscript: the reading of the text
^{vid.} superscript: videtur, i.e. apparent but uncertain reading
aeth or eth: Ethiopic versions
al: alii: i.e., others
arab: Arabic versions
arm: Armenian versions
Byz: Byzantine text-type in the Catholic letters and superscript:

pt: a part of the Codices Byzantini

cop: Coptic versions

ac or akh: Akhmimic version
ac^{2}: Subakhmimic or Lycopolitanic version
bo: Boharic version
cv: Dialect V
cw: Dialect W
fa or fay or mf: Fayyumic Version
mae: Middle Egyptian or Mesokemic version
pbo: Proto-Bohartic version
sa: Sahidic version

ƒ: individually-numbered Greek manuscript family - superscripts:

1: Family 1
13: Family 13

geo: Georgian versions
goth: Gothic versions
𝕲: The Greek Old Testament text, i.e. Septuagint (LXX)
𝕳: The Hebrew Old Testament text, i.e. the Masoretic Text
it: Italic/Vetus Latina, lowercase letters for individual Old Latin manuscripts
lat: most Italic and Vulgate
latt: all Italic and Vulgate
P or 𝔓: papyrus
𝑙 or ℓ: individually numbered lectionary
Lect: most or all numbered lectionaries
𝔐: Greek Majority text and superscripts:

A: Andreas of Caesarea commentary in Revelation
C: Complutensian tradition
K: the Koine tradition in Revelation

o: omits
pc: pauci: i.e., few
pm: permulti: i.e., many
rell.: reliqui, i.e., the remaining ones (manuscripts) in the context
slav: Slavic versions in Old Church Slavonic
syr or sy: Syriac versions and superscripts:

c or cur: Curetonian Gospels
s: Sinaitic Palimpsest
h: Harclean Syriac
hmg: Harclean Syriac, margin
pal: Palestinian Syriac
p: the Peshitta

vg: Latin Vulgate manuscripts (capital letters)

A: Codex Amiatinus
F: Codex Fuldensis
gig: Codex Gigas (Old Latin in Acts and Revelation)
Σ or S: Codex Sangallensis 1395

Major manuscripts: Capital letters, Greek/Hebrew sigla, and it^{superscript}

Greek Uncials, siglum or Gregory–Aland number with a leading 0

א: Codex Sinaiticus (01)
A: Codex Alexandrinus (02)
B: Codex Vaticanus (03)
C: Codex Ephraemi Rescriptus (04)
D^{ea}: Codex Bezae (05)
D^{p}: Codex Claromontanus (06)
E: Codex Basilensis A. N. III. 12 (07)
E^{a}: Codex Laudianus (08)
F^{e}: Codex Boreelianus (09)
F^{p}: Codex Augiensis (010)
G^{e}: Codex Seidelianus I (011)
G^{p}: Codex Boernerianus (012)
H^{e}: Codex Seidelianus II (013)
H^{a}: Codex Mutinensis (014)
H^{p}: Codex Coislinianus (015)
I: Codex Freerianus (016)
K^{e}: Codex Cyprius (017)
K^{ap}: Codex Mosquensis I (018)
L^{e}: Codex Regius (New Testament) (019)
L^{ap}: Codex Angelicus (020)
M: Codex Campianus (021)
N: Codex Petropolitanus Purpureus (022)
O: Sinope Gospels (023)
P^{e}: Codex Guelferbytanus A (024)
P^{apr}: Codex Porphyrianus (025)
Q: Codex Guelferbytanus B (026)
R: Codex Nitriensis (027)
S: Codex Vaticanus 354 (028)
T: Codex Borgianus (029)
U: Codex Nanianus (030)
V: Codex Mosquensis II (031)
W: Codex Washingtonianus (032)
X: Codex Monacensis (X 033) (033)
Y: Codex Macedoniensis (034)
Z: Codex Dublinensis (035)
Γ: Codex Tischendorfianus IV (036)
Δ: Codex Sangallensis 48 (037)
Θ: Codex Koridethi (038)
Λ: Codex Tischendorfianus III (039)
Ξ: Codex Zacynthius (040)
Π: Codex Petropolitanus (041)
Σ: Rossano Gospels (042)
Φ: Codex Beratinus (043)
Ψ: Codex Athous Lavrensis (044)
Ω: Codex Athous Dionysiou (045)
0189: Uncial 0189
See list of other Uncials

Vetus Latina (Old Latin) Uncials, it or OL or 𝕷: with lowercase superscripts:

^{a}: Codex Vercellensis
^{b}: Codex Veronensis
^{d}: Codex Bezae (Gospels, Acts, 3 Jn)
^{d}: Codex Claromontanus (Paul)
^{e}: Codex Palatinus
^{f}: Codex Brixianus
ff^{1}: Codex Corbeiensis I
ff^{2}: Codex Corbeiensis II
^{g}: Codex Boernerianus
g^{1}: Codex Sangermanensis I
gig: Codex Gigas (Acts and Revelation)
^{h}: Codex Floriacensis
^{j}: Codex Purpureus Sarzanensis
^{k}: Codex Bobiensis
^{l}: Codex Rehdigeranus
r^{1}: Codex Usserianus Primus
^{s}: Codex Bobiensis
^{z}: Harley MS 1772
Other superscripts and Beuron numbers

Other manuscripts, sources, and printed texts

Other important manuscripts and sources

Greek Miniscules: See List (no leading 0)
1: Codex Basilensis A. N. IV. 2
2: Codex Basiliensis A. N. IV. 1
8: Minuscule 8
33: Minuscule 33
81: Minuscule 81
565: Minuscule 565
579: Minuscule 579
700: Minuscule 700
1241: Minuscule 1241
1739: Minuscule 1739
2344: Minuscule 2344
The Diatessaron gospel harmony
Church Fathers are cited when relevant
Ju: Justin Martyr
Or: Origen
Dion: Dionysius of Alexandria
Tert: Tertullian
Papyri: See List
𝔓^{13}: Papyrus 13
𝔓^{32}: Papyrus 32
𝔓^{45}: Papyrus 45 (P. Chester Beatty I)
𝔓^{66}: Papyrus 66
𝔓^{72}: Papyrus 72
𝔓^{74}: Papyrus 74
𝔓^{75}: Papyrus 75
Lectionaries: See List
ℓ 185: Lectionary 185
ℓ 211: Lectionary 211
ℓ 249: Lectionary 249
ℓ 253: Lectionary 253
ℓ 299: Lectionary 299
vg: Printed Latin Vulgate (lowercase superscripts)
cl: Editio Clementina
s: Editio Sixtina
st: Vulgata Stuttgartiensis 2007
ww: Wordsworth/White Vulgate

Printed New Testaments: critical and eclectic texts

Latin and Greek Majority texts
E: Erasmus, Novum Instrumentum omne (1516)
ς: The Textus Receptus (so-called) of Robert Estienne (1550)
Beza's Greek and Latin New Testament (1565 to 1611)
M: John Mill, Novum Testamentum Graecum, etc. (1707)
Bengel, Novum Testamentum Graecum (1734)
Wettstein, Novum Testamentum Graecum, etc. (1751)
Ma: Matthaei, Novum Testamentum Graecum, etc. (1803)
Griesbach, Novum Testamentum Graece, etc. (1809 to 1823)
L: Lloyd, Novum Testamentum Graecum (1828, 1836)
Ln: Lachmann, Novum Testamentum Graece et Latine (Greek and Latin, 1842, 1850)
Scr: Scrivener's Greek New Testaments (1877 to 1894)
𝔚: Wordsworth-White, Nouum Testamentum Domini nostri Jesu Christi latine (Latin, 1889)
vS: von Soden, Die Schriften des neuen Testaments, etc. (1902 to 1910)
Farstad and Hodges, The Greek New Testament According to the Majority Text with Apparatus (1982)
Modern Greek NTs with substantially Alexandrian texts
𝔗 or T8th: Tischendorf, Editio Octava Critica Maior (1864 to 1894)
WH: Westcott and Hort, The New Testament in the Original Greek (1881)
Weiss, Das Neue Testament (1894)
NA: Novum Testamentum Graece, Nestle–Aland, NA28 is latest (1898-)
UBS: United Bible Societies, Greek New Testament, UBS5 is latest (1966-)
ECM: Editio Critica Maior, updates to Tischendorf's 8th edition (1997-) (in progress)

The Institute for New Testament Textual Research, founded by Kurt Aland at the University of Münster, is now in charge of the collaborative effort of cataloging New Testament Greek manuscripts. They keep a database and forum online for scholars and researchers to access and update.

=== Dating ===
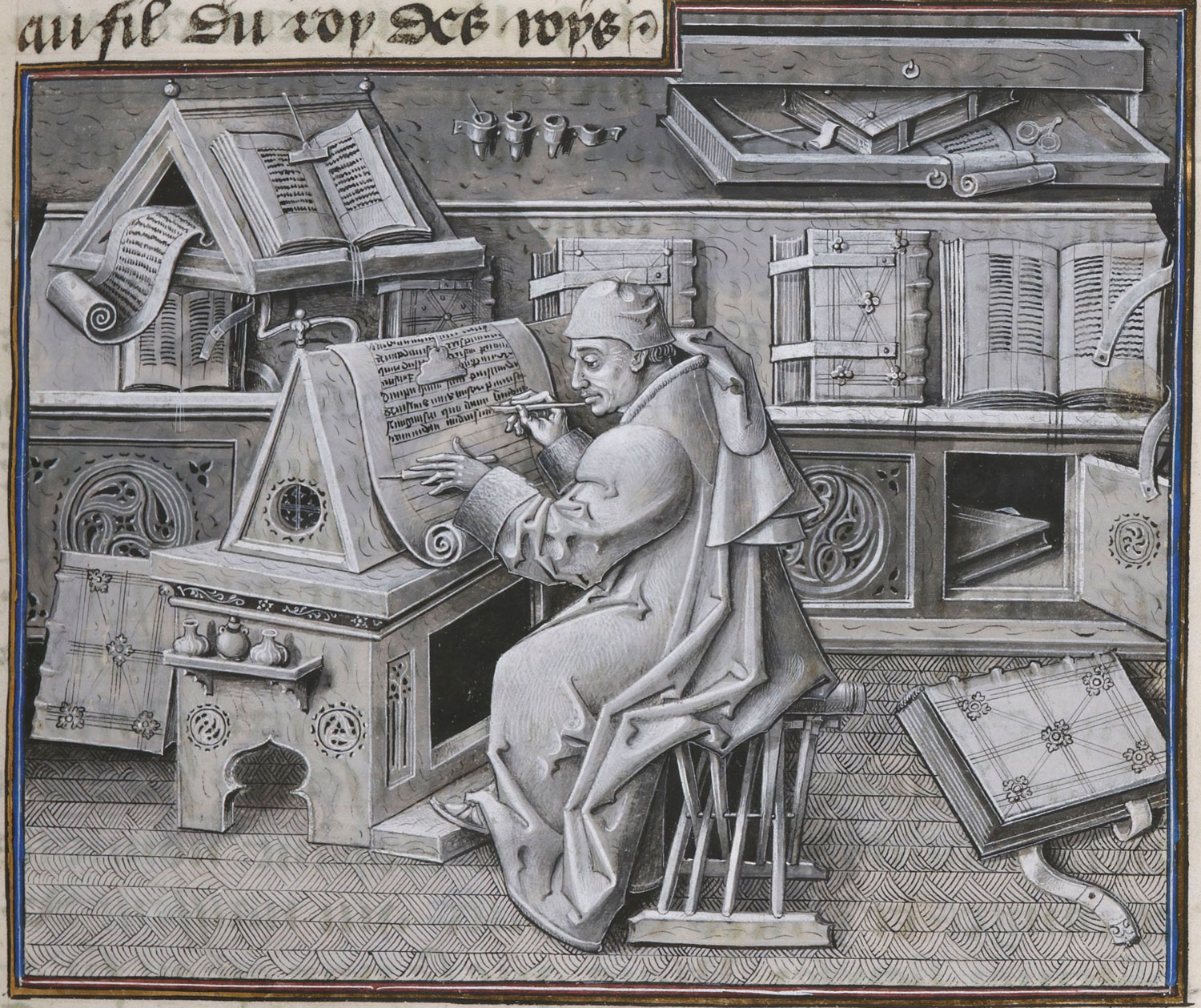
An illustration of a European scribe at work, 1450–1460

The original manuscripts of the New Testament books are not known to have survived. The autographs are believed to have been lost or destroyed a long time ago. What survives are copies of the original. Generally speaking, these copies were made centuries after the originals from other copies rather than from the autograph. Paleography, a science of dating manuscripts by typological analysis of their scripts, is the most precise and objective means known for determining the age of a manuscript. Script groups belong typologically to their generation; and changes can be noted with great accuracy over relatively short periods of time. Dating of manuscript material by a radiocarbon dating test requires that a small part of the material be destroyed in the process. Both radiocarbon and paleographical dating only give a range of possible dates, and it is still debated just how narrow this range might be. Dates established by radiocarbon dating can present a range of 10 to over 100 years. Similarly, dates established by paleography can present a range of 25 to over 125 years.

==== Earliest extant manuscripts ====
The earliest manuscript of a New Testament text is a business-card-sized fragment from the Gospel of John, Rylands Library Papyrus P52, which may be as early as the first half of the 2nd century. The first complete copies of single New Testament books appear around 200, and the earliest complete copy of the New Testament, the Codex Sinaiticus, dates to the 4th century. The following table lists the earliest extant manuscripts for the books of the New Testament.

Book	Earliest extant manuscripts	Date	Condition
Matthew	𝔓^{1}, 𝔓^{37}, 𝔓^{45}, 𝔓^{53}, 𝔓^{64}, 𝔓^{67}, 𝔓^{70}, 𝔓^{77}, 𝔓^{101}, 𝔓^{103}, 𝔓^{104}	c. 150–300 (2nd–3rd century)	Large fragments
Mark	𝔓^{45}, 𝔓^{137}	2nd–3rd century	Large fragments
Luke	𝔓^{4}, 𝔓^{69}, 𝔓^{75}, 𝔓^{45}	c. 175–250 (2nd–3rd century)	Large fragments
John	𝔓^{5}, 𝔓^{6}, 𝔓^{22}, 𝔓^{28}, 𝔓^{39}, 𝔓^{45}, 𝔓^{52}, 𝔓^{66}, 𝔓^{75}, 𝔓^{80}, 𝔓^{90}, 𝔓^{95}, 𝔓^{106}	c. 125–250 (2nd–3rd century)	Large fragments
Acts	𝔓^{29}, 𝔓^{38}, 𝔓^{45}, 𝔓^{48}, 𝔓^{53}, 𝔓^{74}, 𝔓^{91}	Early 3rd century	Large fragments
Romans	𝔓^{27}, 𝔓^{40}, 𝔓^{46}	c. 175–225 (2nd–3rd century)	Fragments
1 Corinthians	𝔓^{14}, 𝔓^{15}, 𝔓^{46}	c. 175–225 (2nd–3rd century)	Fragments
2 Corinthians	𝔓^{46}	c. 175–225 (2nd–3rd century)	Fragments
Galatians	𝔓^{46}	c. 175–225 (2nd–3rd century)	Fragments
Ephesians	𝔓^{46}, 𝔓^{49}	c. 175–225 (2nd–3rd century)	Fragments
Philippians	𝔓^{16}, 𝔓^{46}	c. 175–225 (2nd–3rd century)	Fragments
Colossians	𝔓^{46}	c. 175–225 (2nd–3rd century)	Fragments
1 Thessalonians	𝔓^{30}, 𝔓^{46}, 𝔓^{65}	c. 175–225 (2nd–3rd century)	Fragments
2 Thessalonians	𝔓^{30}	Early 3rd century	Fragments
1 Timothy	𝔓^{133}	c. 250 (3rd century)	Fragments
2 Timothy	א	c. 350 (4th century)	Complete
Titus	𝔓^{32}	c. 200 (late 2nd – early 3rd century)	Fragment
Philemon	𝔓^{87}	3rd century	Fragment
Hebrews	𝔓^{12}, 𝔓^{13}, 𝔓^{17}, 𝔓^{46}	c. 175–225 (2nd–3rd century)	Fragments
James	𝔓^{20}, 𝔓^{23}, 𝔓^{100}	3rd century	Fragments
1 Peter	𝔓^{81}, 𝔓^{72}	c. 300 (late 3rd – early 4th century)	Fragments
2 Peter	𝔓^{72}	c. 300 (late 3rd – early 4th century)	Fragments
1 John	𝔓^{9}	3rd century	Fragment
2 John	א	c. 350 (4th century)	Complete
3 John	א	c. 350 (4th century)	Complete
Jude	𝔓^{72}, 𝔓^{78}	c. 300 (late 3rd – early 4th century)	Fragments
Revelation	𝔓^{18}, 𝔓^{24}, 𝔓^{43}, 𝔓^{47}, 𝔓^{85}, 𝔓^{98}, 𝔓^{115}	c. 150–250 (2nd–3rd century)	Fragments

=== Textual criticism ===
Palaeography is the study of ancient writing, and textual criticism is the study of manuscripts in order to reconstruct a probable original or initially copied text.

None of the original documents of the New Testament is known to scholars to be extant (surviving); and the existing manuscripts differ from one another. The textual critic seeks to ascertain from the divergent copies which form of the text should be regarded as most conforming to the original. The New Testament has been preserved in three major manuscript traditions: the 4th-century-CE Alexandrian text-type, the Western text-type, and the Byzantine text-type, which includes over 80% of all manuscripts, the majority comparatively very late in the tradition.

Since the mid-19th century, eclecticism, in which there is no a priori bias to a single manuscript, has been the dominant method of editing the Greek text of the New Testament. This is reflected in the Novum Testamentum Graece, which since 2014 corresponds to both the United Bible Society, 5th edition and Nestle-Aland, 28th edition. In textual criticism, eclecticism is the practice of examining a wide number of text witnesses and selecting the variant that seems best. The result of the process is a text with readings drawn from many witnesses. In a purely eclectic approach, no single witness is theoretically favored. Instead, the critic forms opinions about individual witnesses, relying on both external and internal evidence. Even so, the oldest manuscripts, being of the Alexandrian text-type, are the most favored in these two publications; and the critical text has an Alexandrian disposition. Most English translations of the New Testament made in the 20th century were based on these copies.

Textual scholar Bart D. Ehrman writes: "It is true, of course, that the New Testament is abundantly attested in the manuscripts produced through the ages, but most of these manuscripts are many centuries removed from the originals, and none of them perfectly accurate. They all contain mistakes – altogether many thousands of mistakes. It is not an easy task to reconstruct the original words of the New Testament...." In reference to the textual evidence for the New Testament, Bruce M. Metzger wrote,

In evaluating the significance of these statistics...one should consider, by way of contrast, the number of manuscripts which preserve the text of the ancient classics. Homer's Iliad...is preserved by 457 papyri, 2 uncial manuscripts, and 188 minuscule manuscripts. Among the tragedians the witnesses to Euripides are the most abundant; his extant works are preserved in 54 papyri and 276 parchment manuscripts, almost all of the later dating from the Byzantine period...the time between the composition of the books of the New Testament and the earliest extant copies is relatively brief. Instead of the lapse of a millennium or more, as is the case of not a few classical authors, several papyrus manuscripts of portions of the New Testament are extant which were copies within a century or so after the composition of the original documents. (Note: As a footnote to his comments, Metzger also said, "Lest, however, the wrong impression be conveyed from the statistics given above regarding the total number of Greek manuscripts of the New Testament, it should be pointed out that most of the papyri are relatively fragmentary and that only about fifty manuscripts (of which the Codex Sinaiticus is the only Uncial manuscript) contain the entire New Testament.")

Biblical scholar Gary Habermas adds,

What is usually meant is that the New Testament has far more manuscript evidence from a far earlier period than other classical works. There are just under 6000 NT manuscripts, with copies of most of the NT dating from just 100 years or so after its writing. Classical sources almost always have fewer than 20 copies each and usually date from 700-1400 years after the composition of the work. In this regard, the classics are not as well attested. While this doesn't guarantee truthfulness, it means that it is much easier to reconstruct the New Testament text. Regarding genre, the Gospels are usually taken today to be examples of Roman biographies.

Every year, several New Testament manuscripts handwritten in the original Greek format are discovered. The latest substantial find was in 2008, when 47 new manuscripts were discovered in Albania; at least 17 of them unknown to Western scholars. There has been an estimate of 400,000 variations among all these manuscripts (from the 2nd to 15th century). If those 400,000 variations are spread over 5,600 manuscripts, the average manuscript has only about 71 variations, although some of these manuscripts are the equivalent of several hundred pages of text, hand-written (see Codex Vaticanus, Codex Alexandrinus, et al.). The number of variants is additionally less significant than may appear since it is a comparison across linguistic boundaries. More important estimates focus on comparing texts within languages. Those variations are considerably fewer. The vast majority of these are accidental errors made by scribes, and are easily identified as such: an omitted word, a duplicate line, a misspelling, a rearrangement of words. Some variations involve apparently intentional changes, which often make more difficult a determination of whether they were corrections from better exemplars, harmonizations between readings, or ideologically motivated. Variants are listed in critical editions of the text, the most important of which is the Novum Testamentum Graece, which is the basis for most modern translations. For over 250 years, Christian scholars have argued that no textual variant affects key Christian doctrine.

=== Listings ===
- List of New Testament papyri
- List of New Testament uncials
- List of New Testament minuscules
- List of New Testament lectionaries
- List of New Testament Latin manuscripts

== Gallery ==
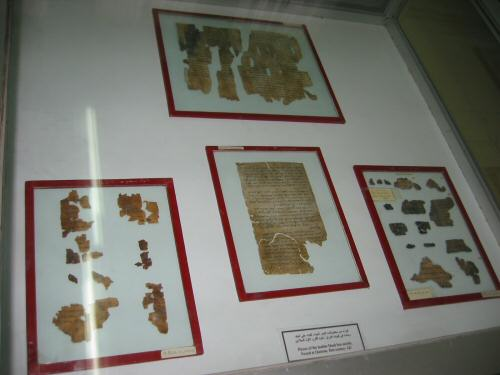
Fragments of the Dead Sea Scrolls on display at the Archeological Museum, Amman

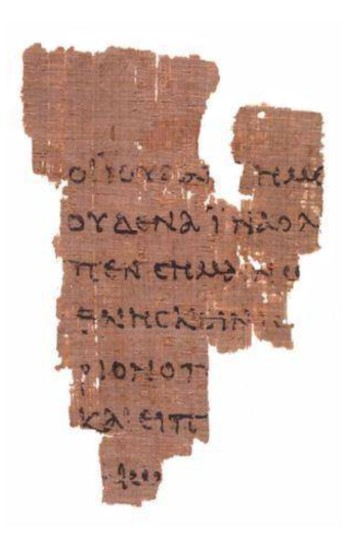
𝔓^{52} is the oldest known manuscript fragment of the New Testament, containing a portion of the Gospel of John

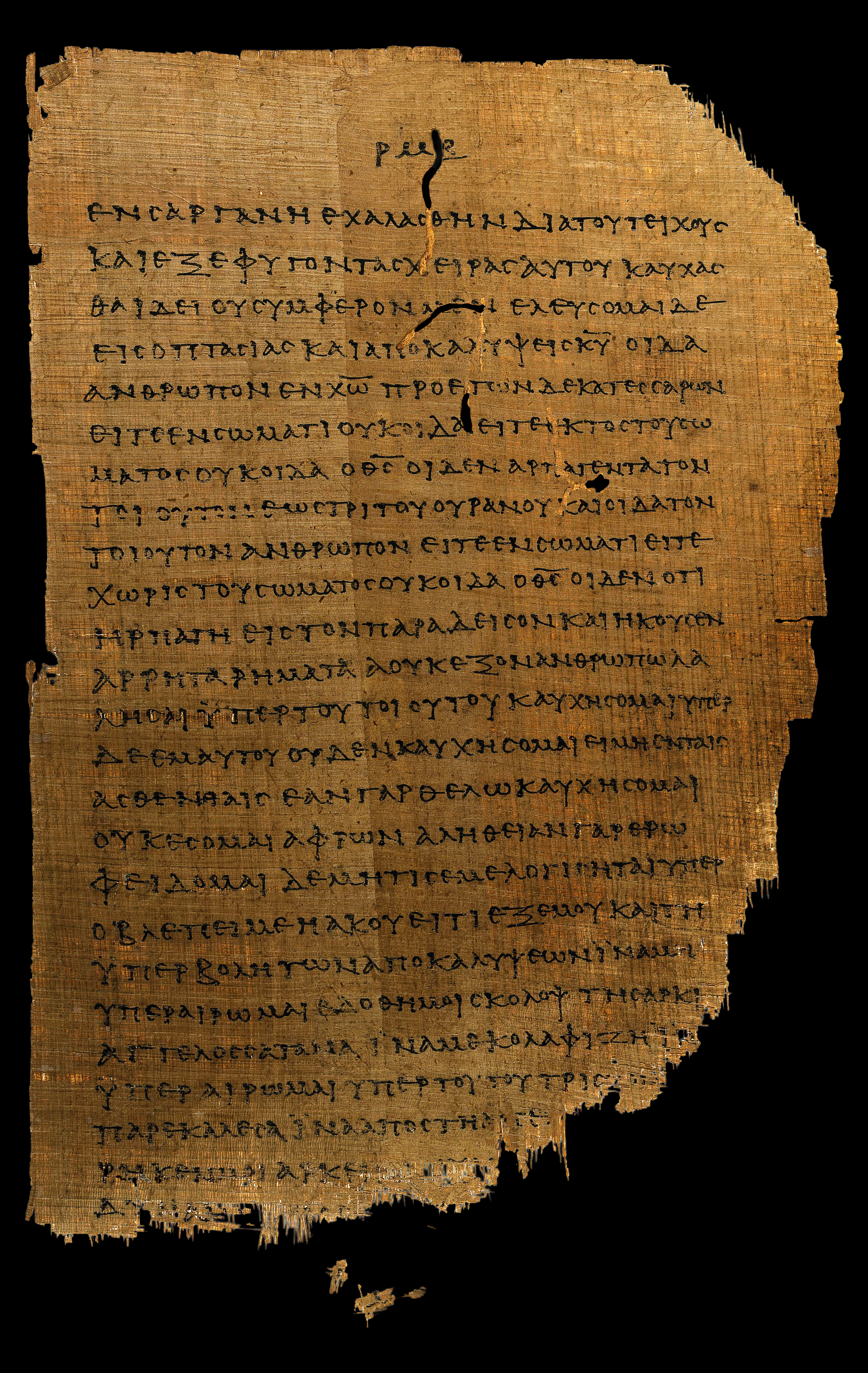
𝔓^{46} is the earliest (nearly) complete manuscript of the Epistles written by Paul in the new testament.

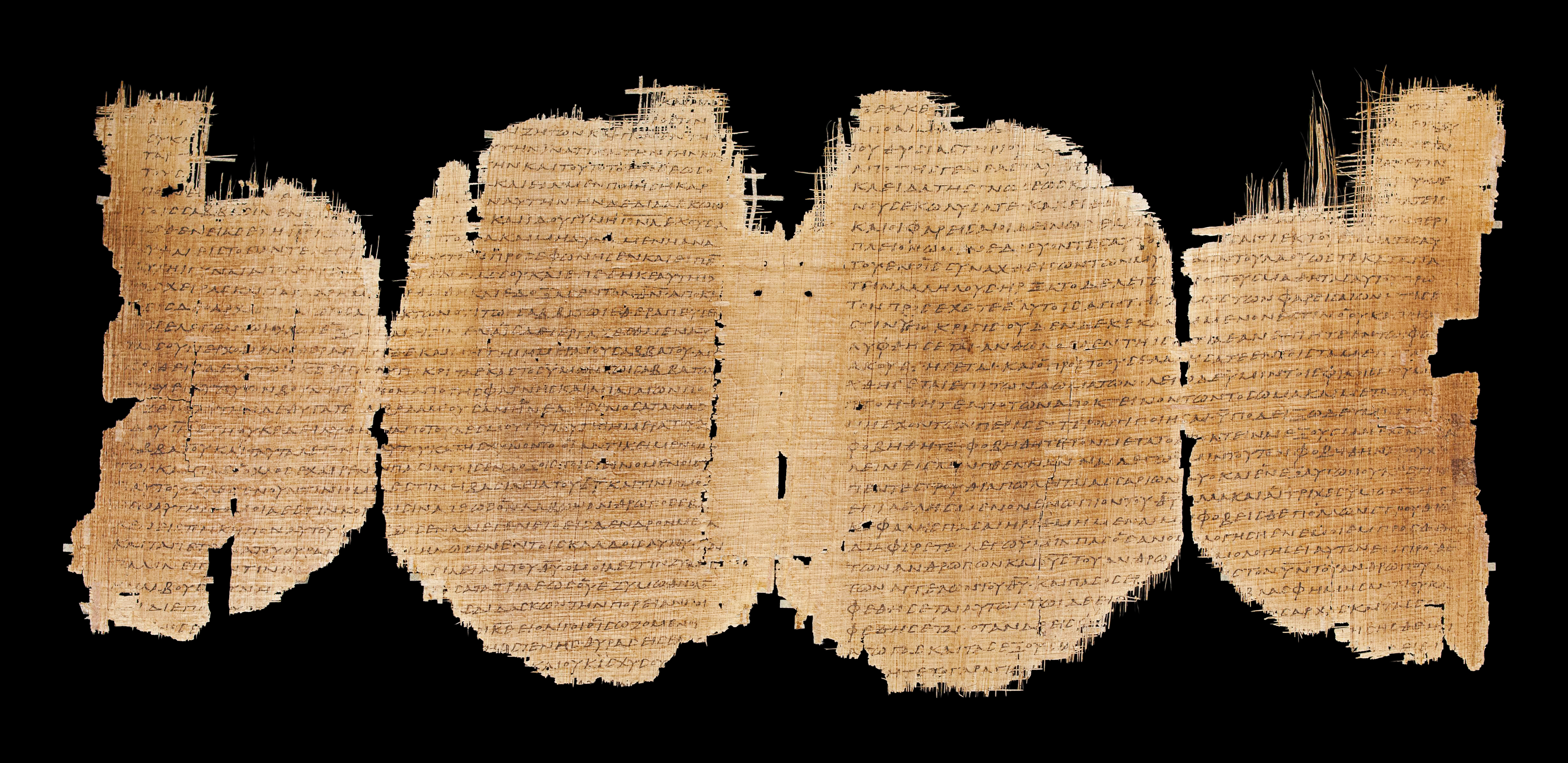
𝔓^{45} is a manuscript of Gospels and Acts. It contains the earliest known text of Mark. Scholars find it hard to read it because of its fragmentary state.

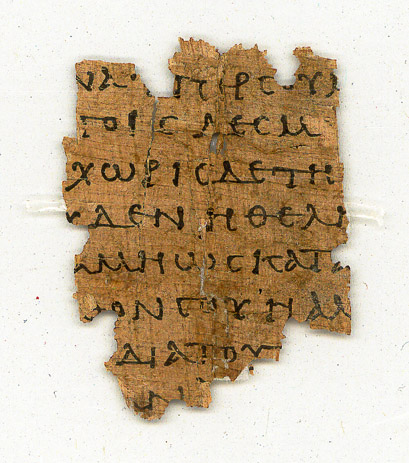
𝔓^{87} is the earliest known manuscript of Philemon.

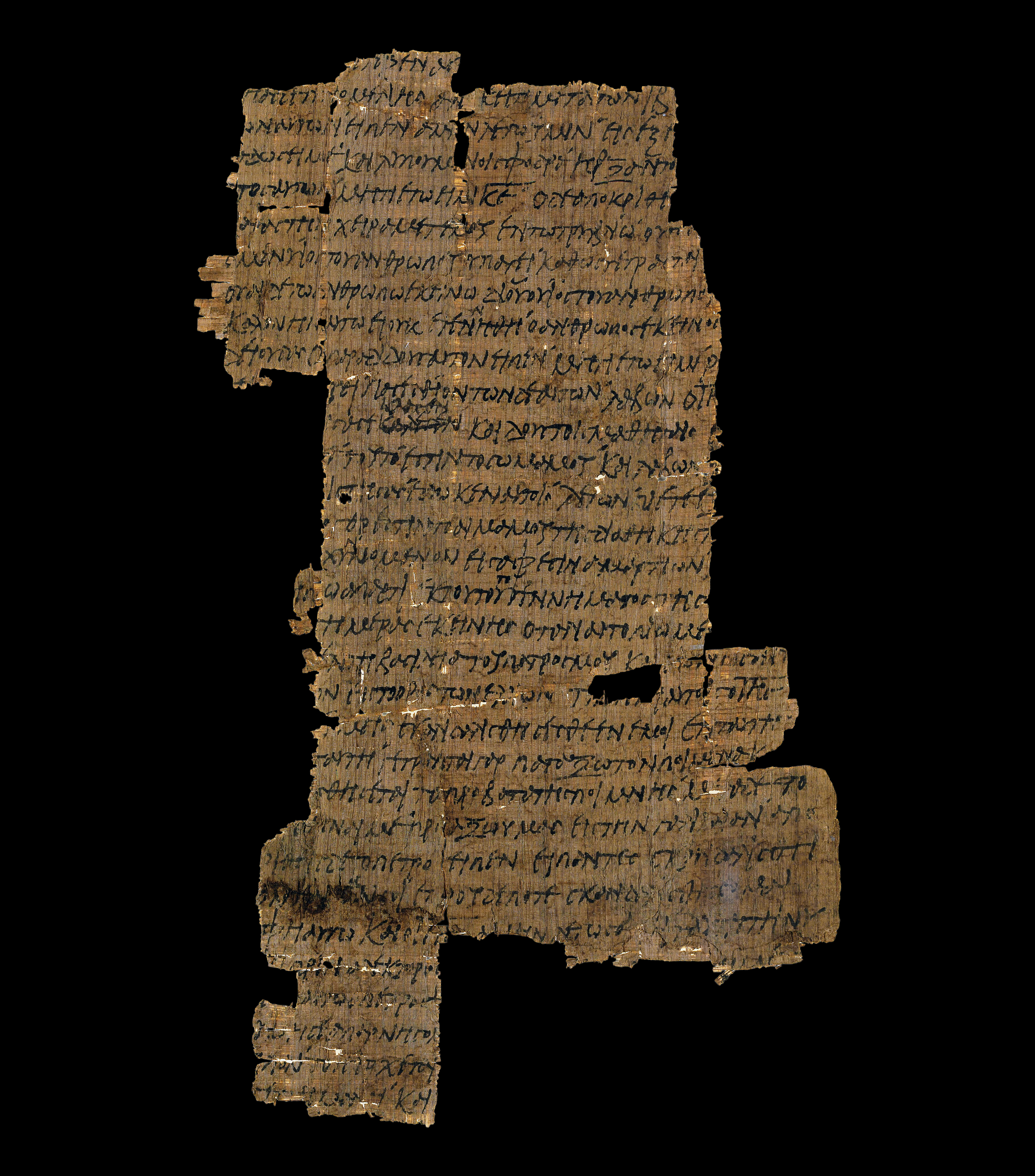
𝔓^{37} is a fragment of the Gospel of Matthew containing nomina sacra.

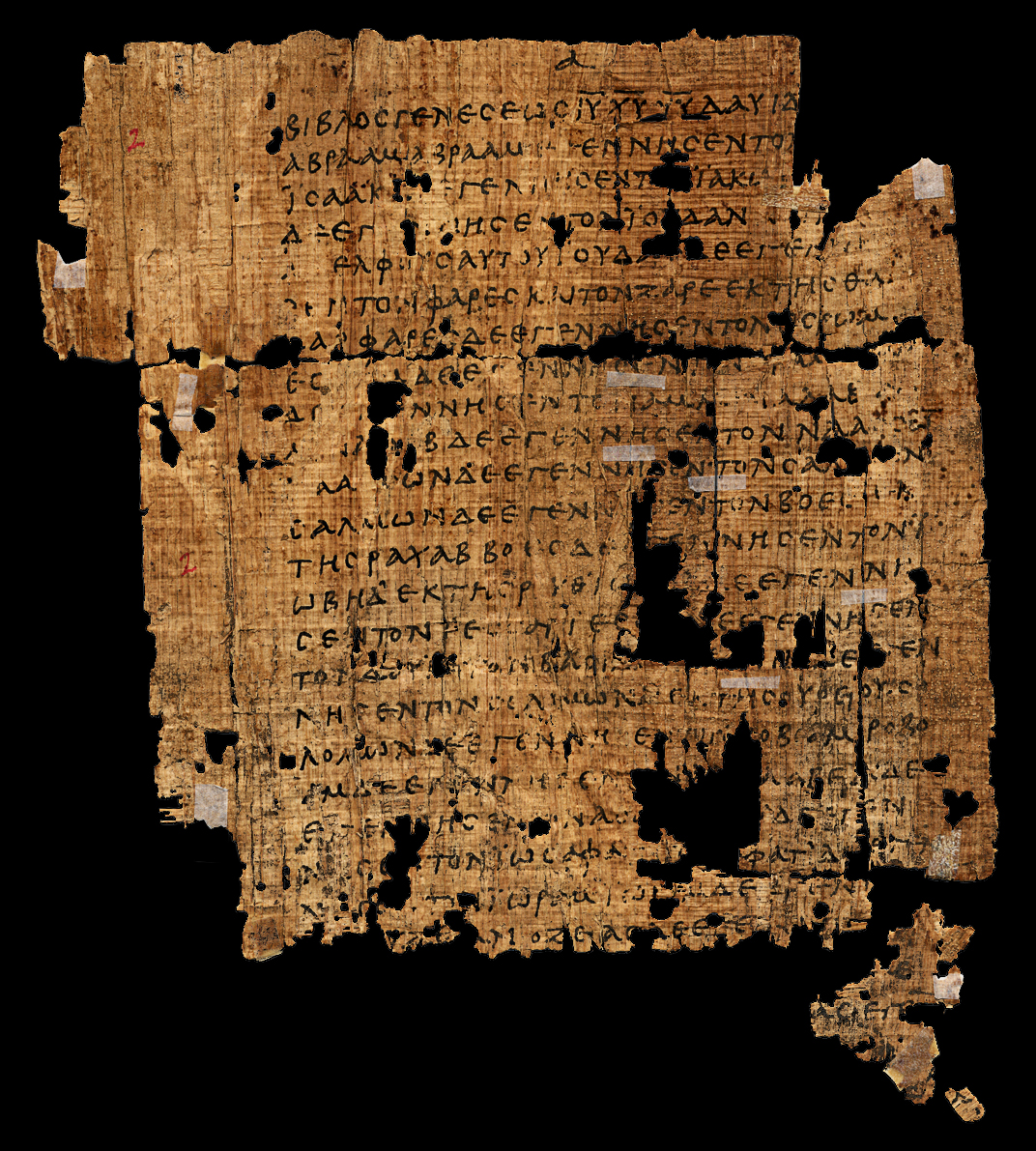
𝔓^{1} is an early third century fragment of the Gospel of Matthew.

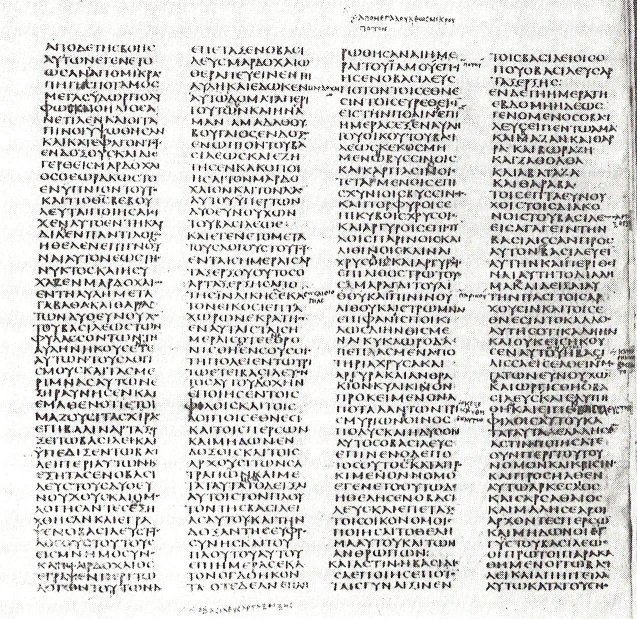
Codex Sinaiticus (c. 350) contains the oldest complete copy of the New Testament, as well as most of the Greek Old Testament, known as the Septuagint

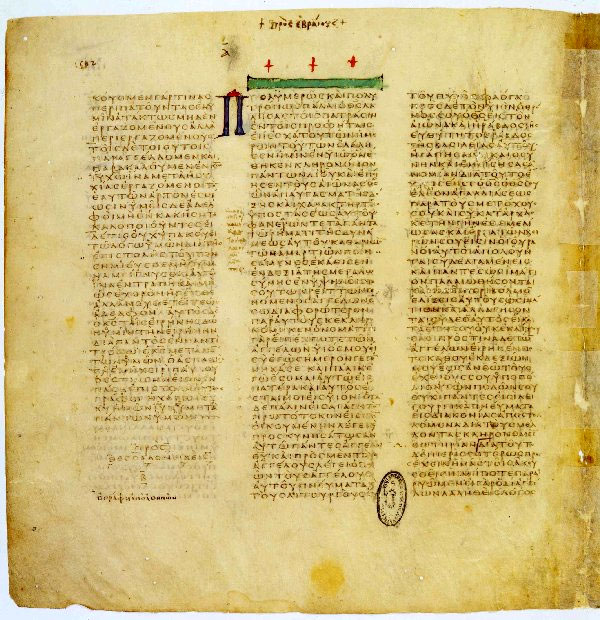
Codex Vaticanus Graecus 1209 is one of the best available Greek manuscripts of almost the entire bible.

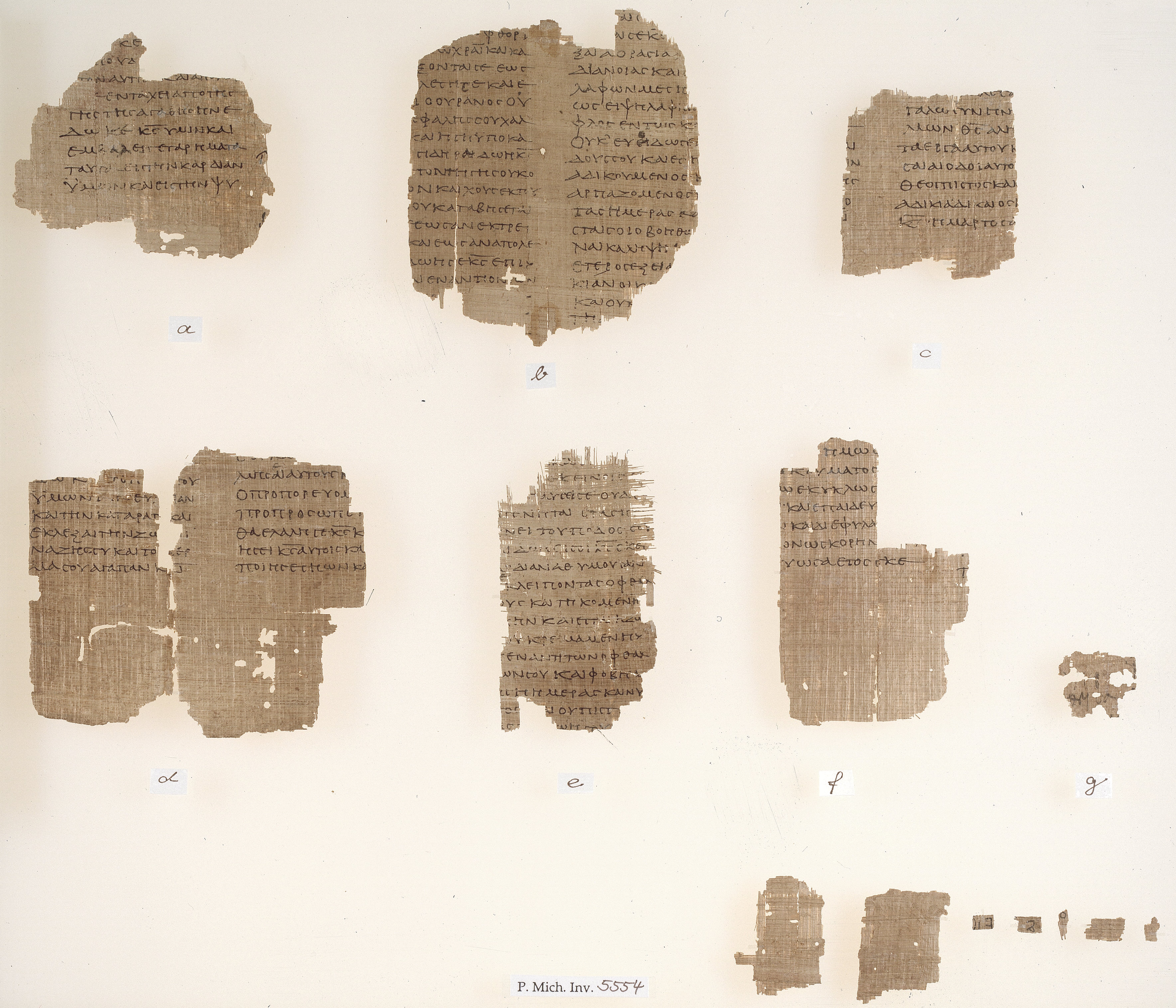
P. Chester Beatty VI showing portions of Deuteronomy

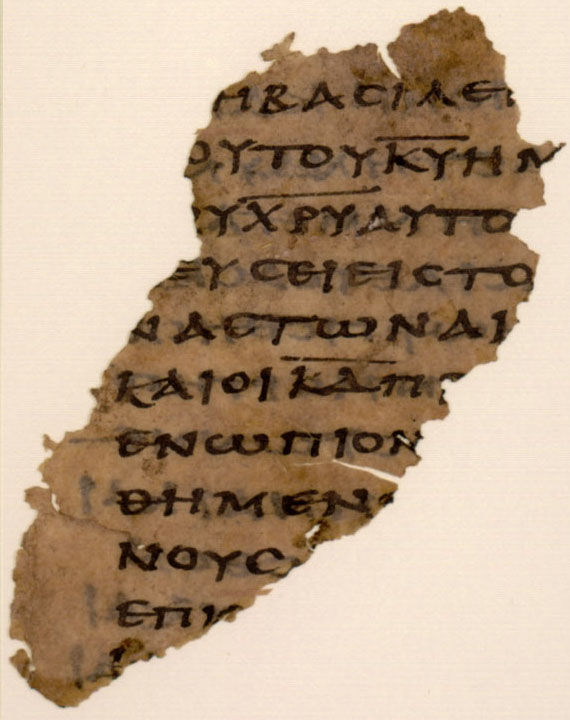
Uncial 0308 is a fragment of the Book of Revelation.

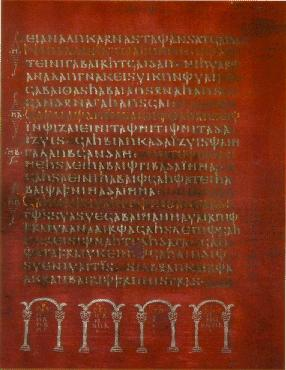
The first page of the Gothic language Codex Argenteus

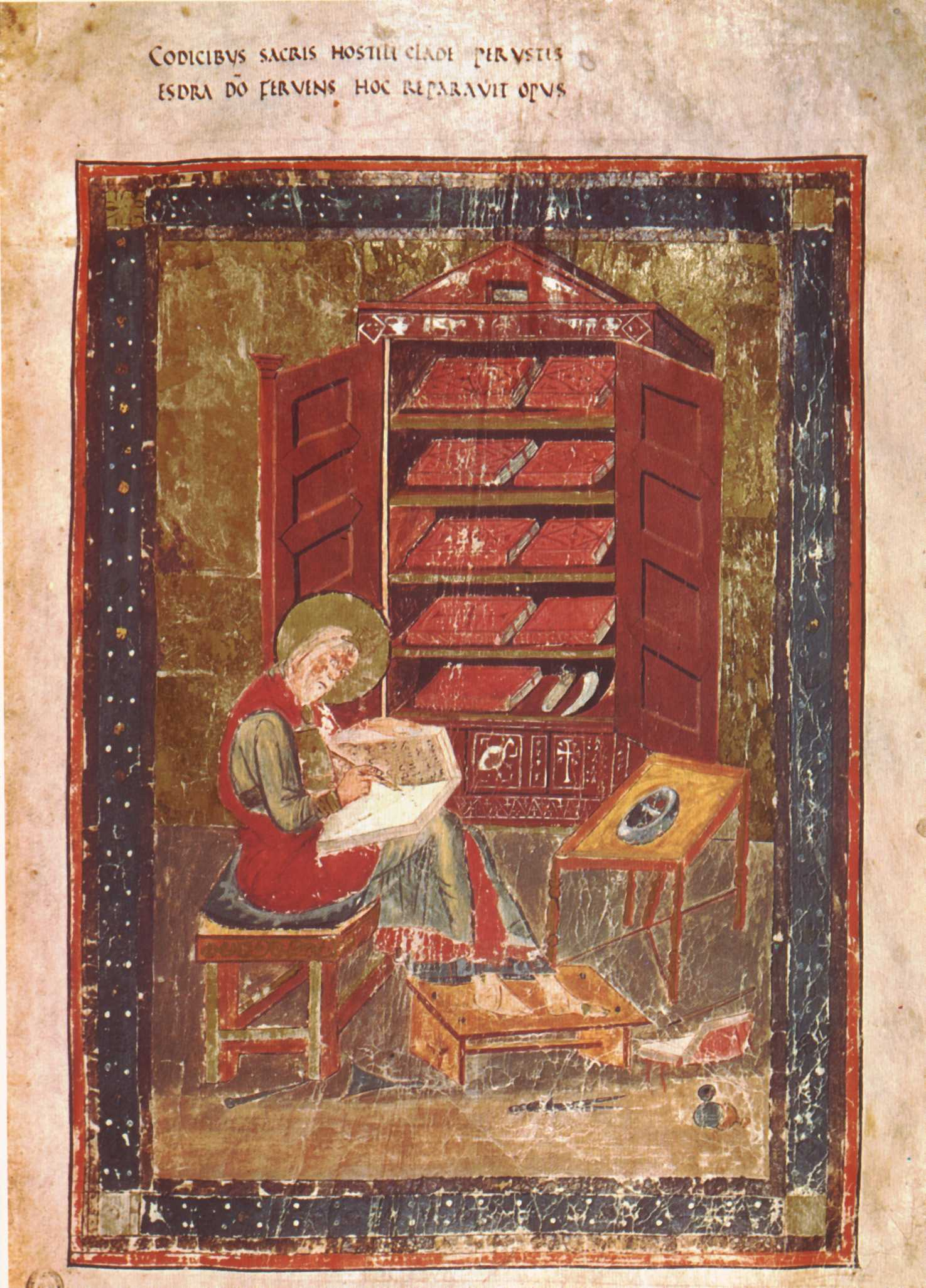
Folio 5r of the Codex Amiatinus, manuscript of Vulgate

== See also ==
- Ancient literature
- Apographa
- Dating the Bible
- Biblical criticism
- Textual criticism
- Categories of New Testament manuscripts
  - Alexandrian text-type
  - Byzantine text-type
  - Caesarean text-type
  - Western text-type
- List of major textual variants in the New Testament
- Higher criticism
- Manuscript culture
- Nag Hammadi library
- Fifty Bibles of Constantine
- List of Hebrew Bible manuscripts
- List of illuminated manuscripts

== Bibliography ==
- Aland, Kurt; Aland, Barbara (1995). The Text of The New Testament: An Introduction to the Critical Editions and to the Theory and Practice of Modern Textual Criticism. Translated by Erroll F. Rhodes (2nd ed.). Grand Rapids, MI: Wm. B. Eerdmans Publishing Company. pp. 40f, 72f. ISBN 0-8028-4098-1.
- Aland, Barbara; Delobel, Joël (1994). New Testament textual criticism, exegesis and church history: a discussion of methods. Kampen: Kok Pharos. ISBN 9-03-900105-7.
- Barkay, G.; Vaughn, A.G.; Lundberg, M.J.; Zuckerman, B. (2004). "The Amulets from Ketef Hinnom: A New Edition and Evaluation". Bulletin of the American Schools of Oriental Research. Vol. 334. pp. 41–71. "An innovation in the report was the simultaneous publication of an accompanying "digital article," a CD version of the article and the images"
- Bruce, F. F. (1964). "The Last Thirty Years". In Frederic G. Kenyon (ed.). Story of the Bible.
- Bruce, F. F. (2003). The New Testament Documents: Are They Reliable?. Wm. B. Eerdmans. ISBN 978-0802822192.
- Comfort, Philip W.; Barrett, David P. (2001). The Text of the Earliest New Testament Greek Manuscripts. Wheaton, Illinois: Tyndale House. ISBN 0-8423-5265-1.
- Ehrman, Bart D. (2004). The New Testament: A Historical Introduction to the Early Christian Writings. New York: Oxford. pp. 480f. ISBN 0-19-515462-2.
- Kruger, Michael J. (2012). Canon revisited : establishing the origins and authority of the New Testament books (1st ed.). Wheaton, Ill.: Crossway. ISBN 9781433505003.
- Metzger, Bruce M. (1992). The Text of the New Testament: Its Transmission, Corruption and Restoration (3rd ed.). Oxford University Press. ISBN 0-19-507297-9.
- Metzger, Bruce M.; Ehrman, Bart D. (2005). The Text of the New Testament: Its Transmission, Corruption and Restoration (4th ed.). Oxford University Press. ISBN 0-19-516667-1.
- Seid, Timothy W. "Interpreting Ancient Manuscripts". Interpreting Ancient Manuscripts Web
- von Soden, Hermann (1902). Die Schriften des Neuen Testaments, in ihrer ältesten erreichbaren Textgestalt hergestellt auf Grund ihrer Textgeschichte (in German). Berlin: Glaue. "4 vols., 1902–1910"
- Waltz, Robert. "An Introduction to New Testament Textual Criticism". A Site Inspired By: The Encyclopedia of New Testament Textual Criticism.
- Wilson, Robert Dick (1929). "The Textual Criticism of the Old Testament". The Princeton Theological Review. 27: 40.
