= Papyrus 53 =

Papyrus 𝔓^{53}
- New Testament manuscript
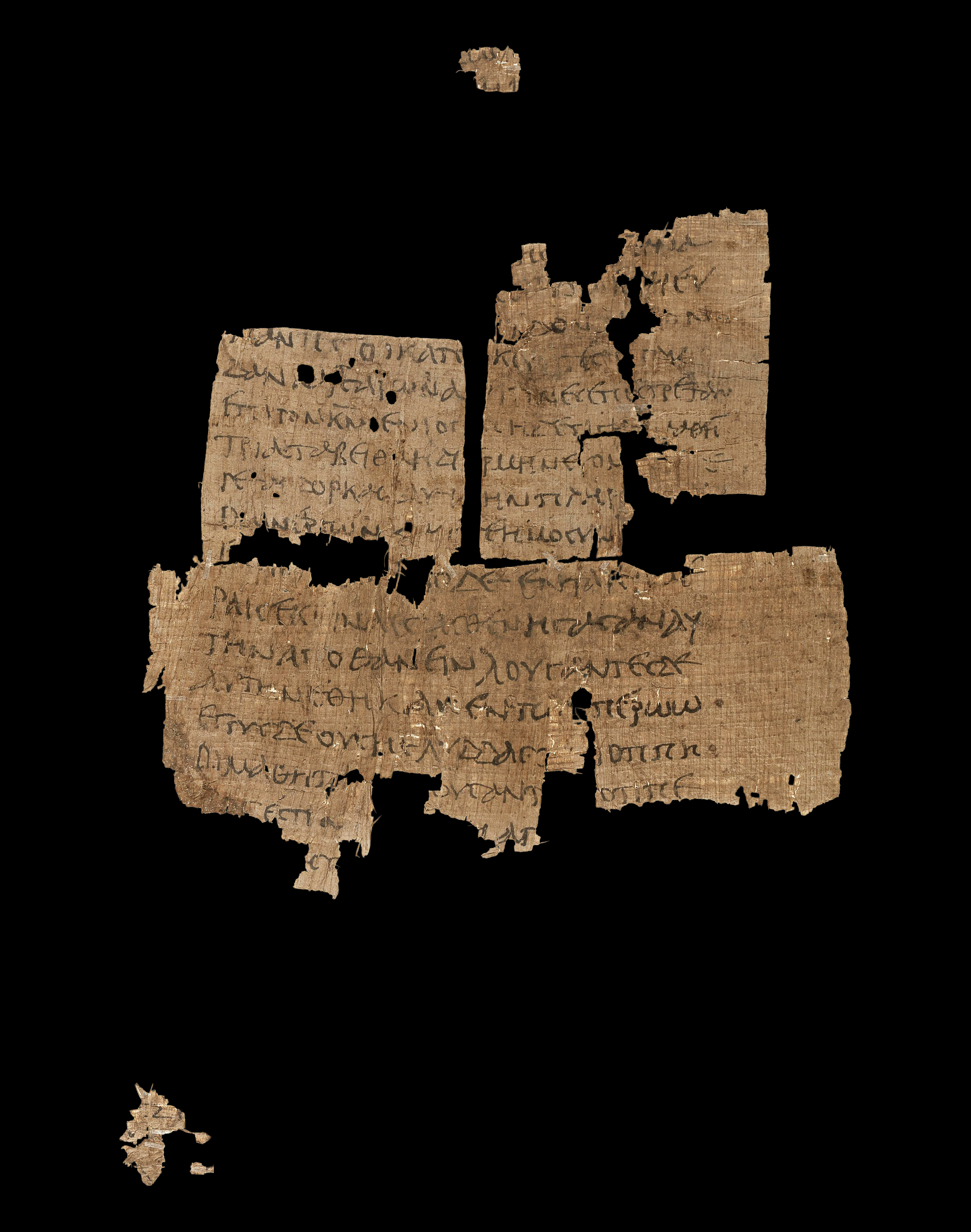
- Matthew fragment recto, Matt 26, 36-40
- Text: Matthew 26 †; Acts 9-10 †
- Date: 3rd century
- Script: Greek
- Found: Egypt
- Now at: University of Michigan
- Cite: H. A. Sanders, A Third Century Papyrus of Matthew and Acts XVIII (London: 1937), pp. 151-161.
- Type: Alexandrian text-type
- Category: I

Papyrus 53 (in the Gregory-Aland numbering), signed by 𝔓^{53}, is an early copy of the New Testament in Koine Greek. It is a papyrus manuscript containing parts of the Gospel of Matthew and the Acts of the Apostles: it contains only Matthew 26:29-40 and Acts 9:33-10:1. The manuscript palaeographically had been assigned to the 3rd century. These two fragments were found together, they were part of a codex containing the four Gospels and Acts or Matthew and Acts.

The Greek text of this codex is a representative of the Alexandrian text-type (proto-Alexandrian). Aland ascribed it as "at least Normal text", and placed it in Category I.

It is currently housed at the University of Michigan (Inv. 6652) in Ann Arbor.

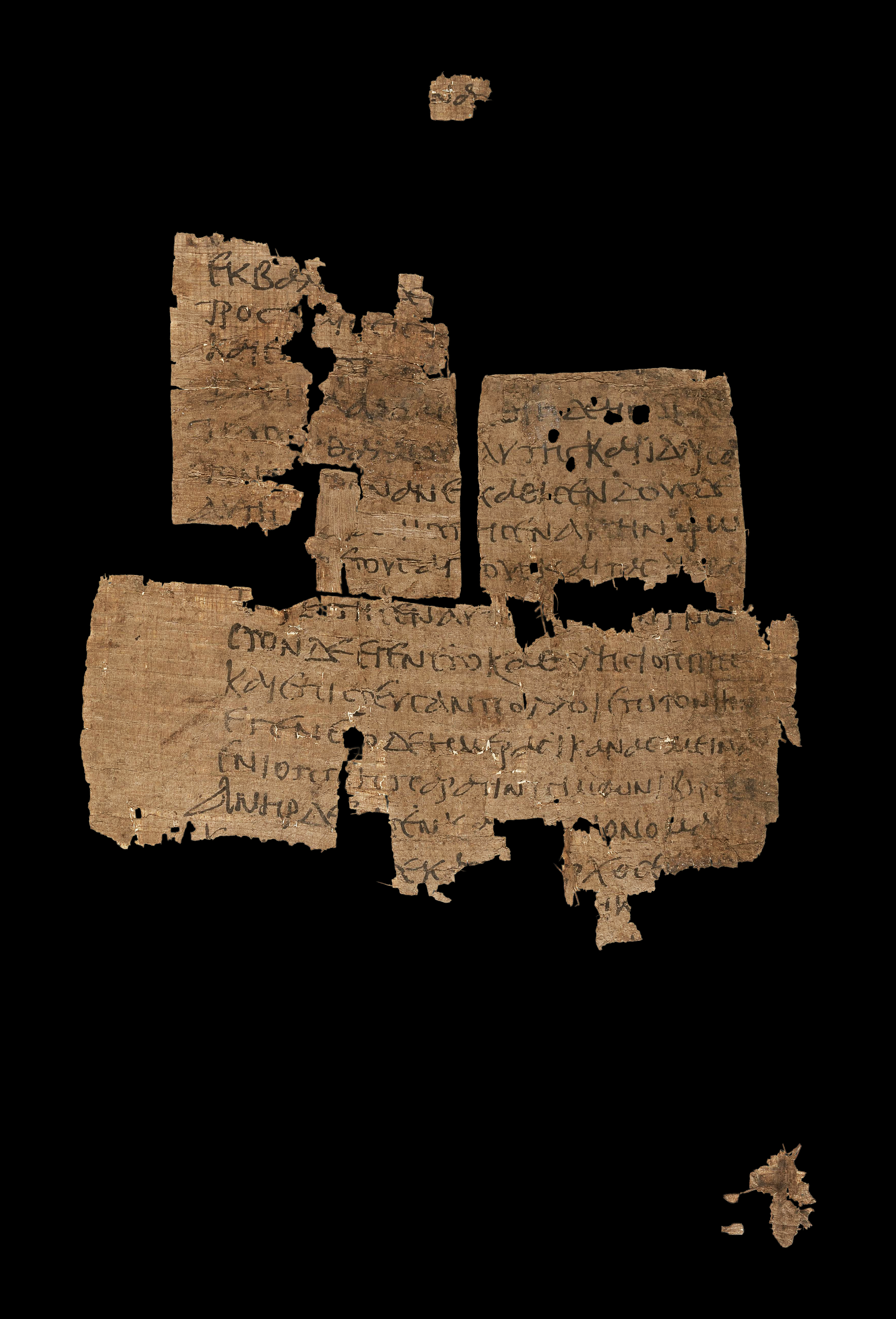
Matthew fragment verso, Matt 26:29-35

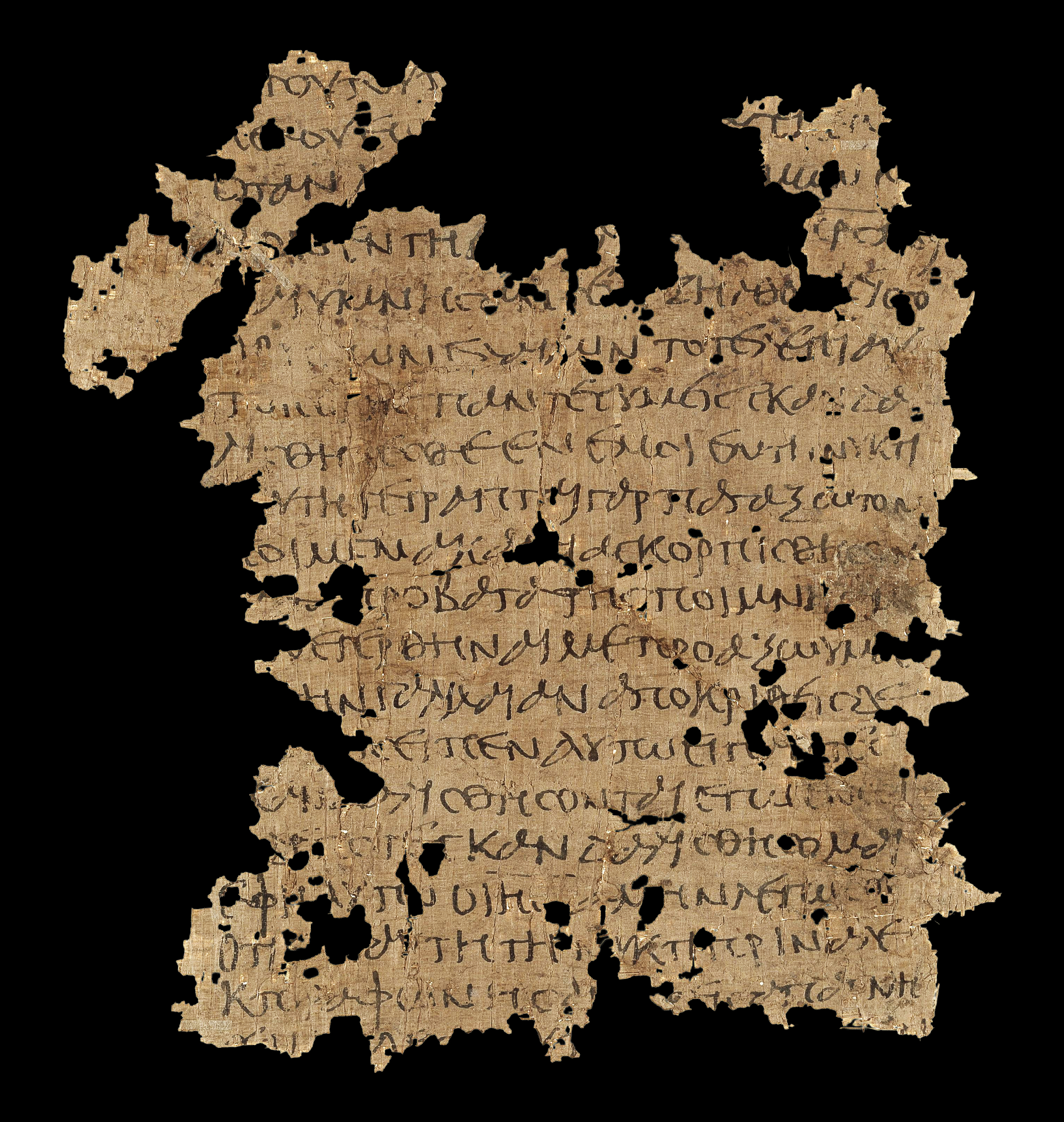
Acts fragment recto, Acts 9:40-10:1

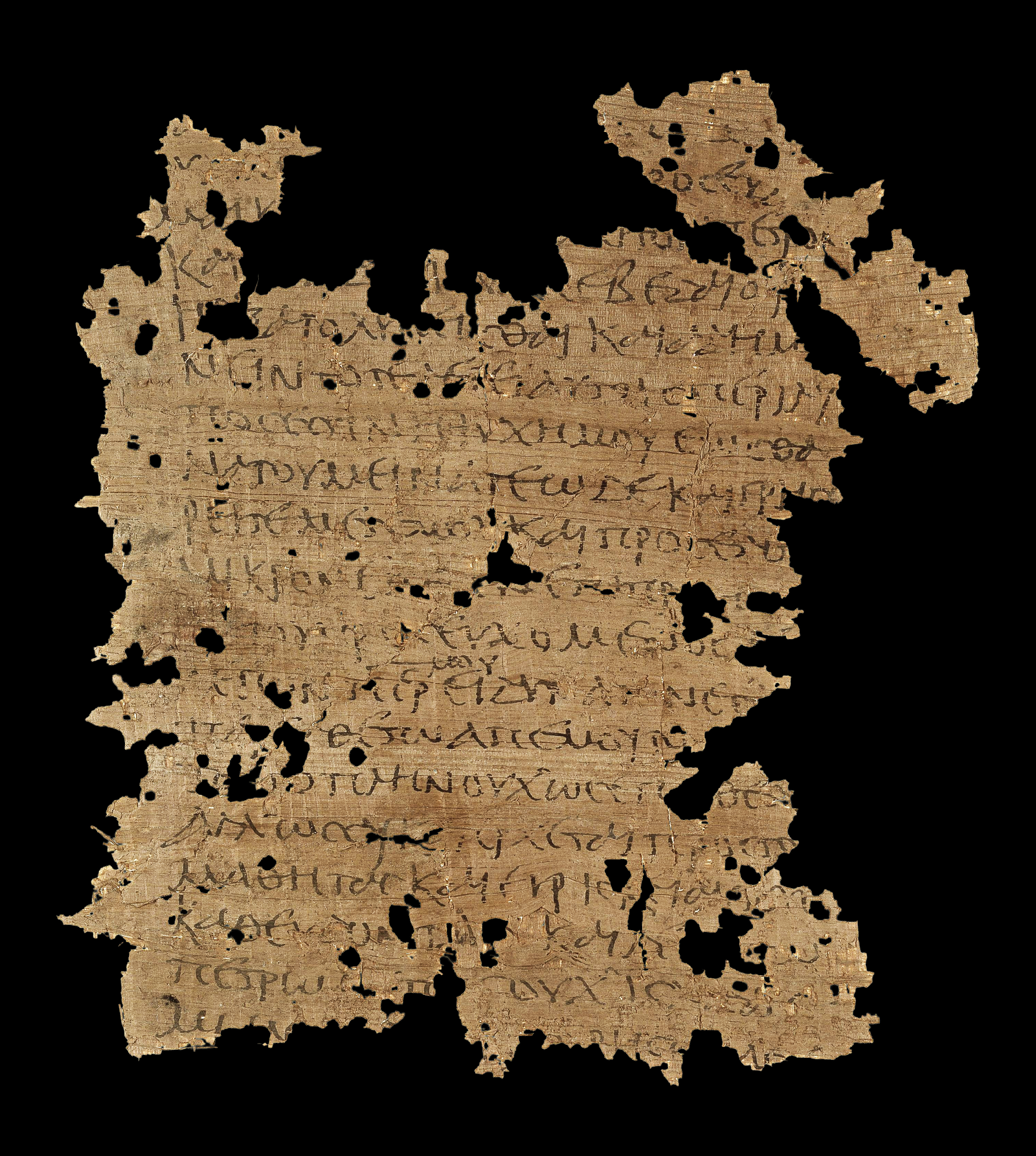
Acts fragment verso, Acts 9:34-38

== See also ==
- List of New Testament papyri
