= Papyrus 87 =

- New Testament manuscript
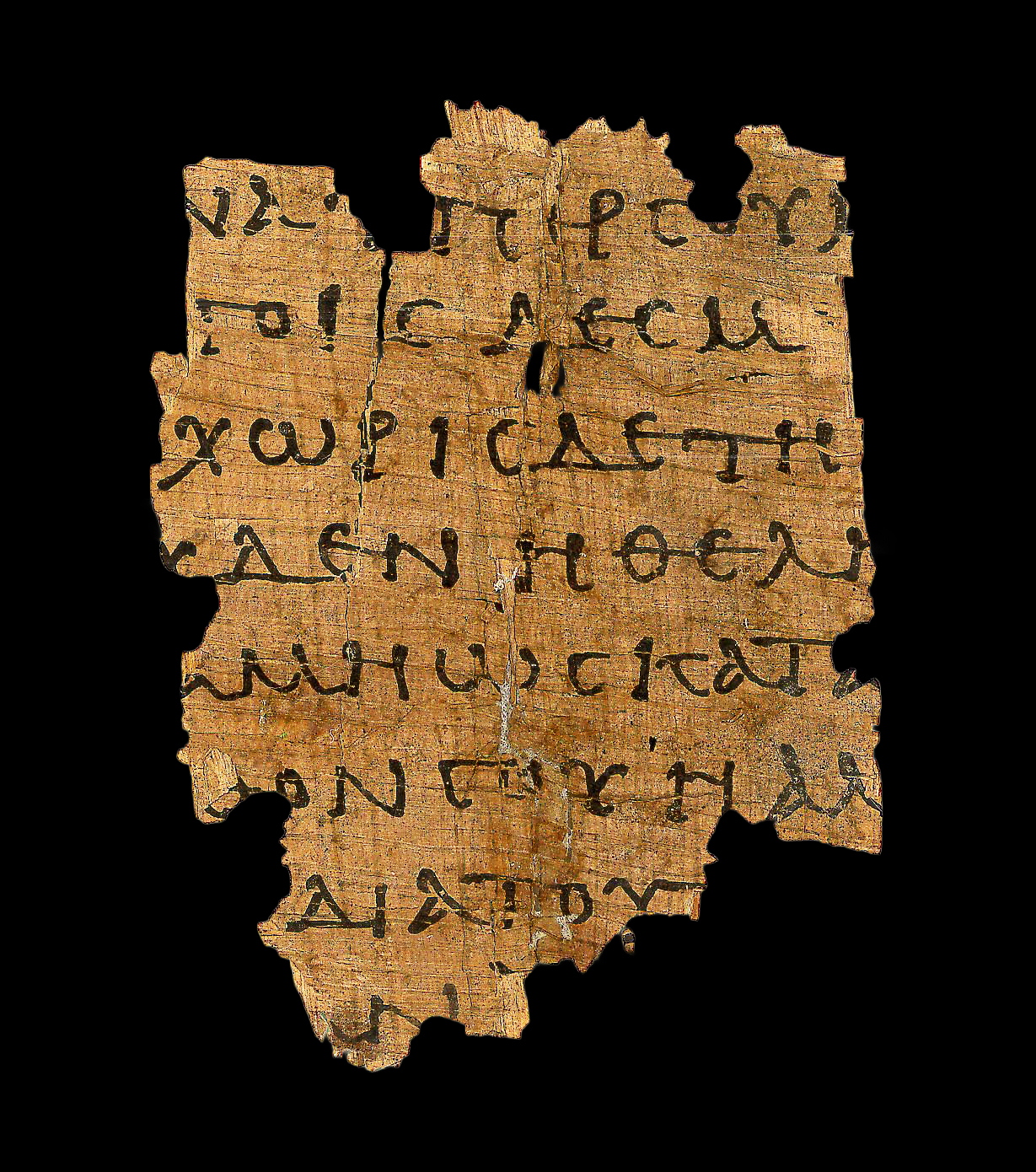
- Papyrus 87, recto
- Sign: 𝔓^{87}
- Text: Philemon 13-15, 24-25
- Date: ca. 250
- Script: Greek
- Now at: Institut für Altertumskunde, University of Cologne
- Cite: C. Römer, Kölner Papyri 4, Papyrologica Colonensia 7 (Cologne: 1984), pp. 28-31
- Type: Alexandrian text-type
- Category: I

Papyrus 87 (in the Gregory-Aland numbering), designated by 𝔓^{87}, is an early New Testament papyrus. It is the earliest known manuscript of the Epistle to Philemon. The surviving texts of Philemon are verses 13–15, 24–25.

The manuscript paleographically has been assigned to the early 3rd century (or late 2nd century).

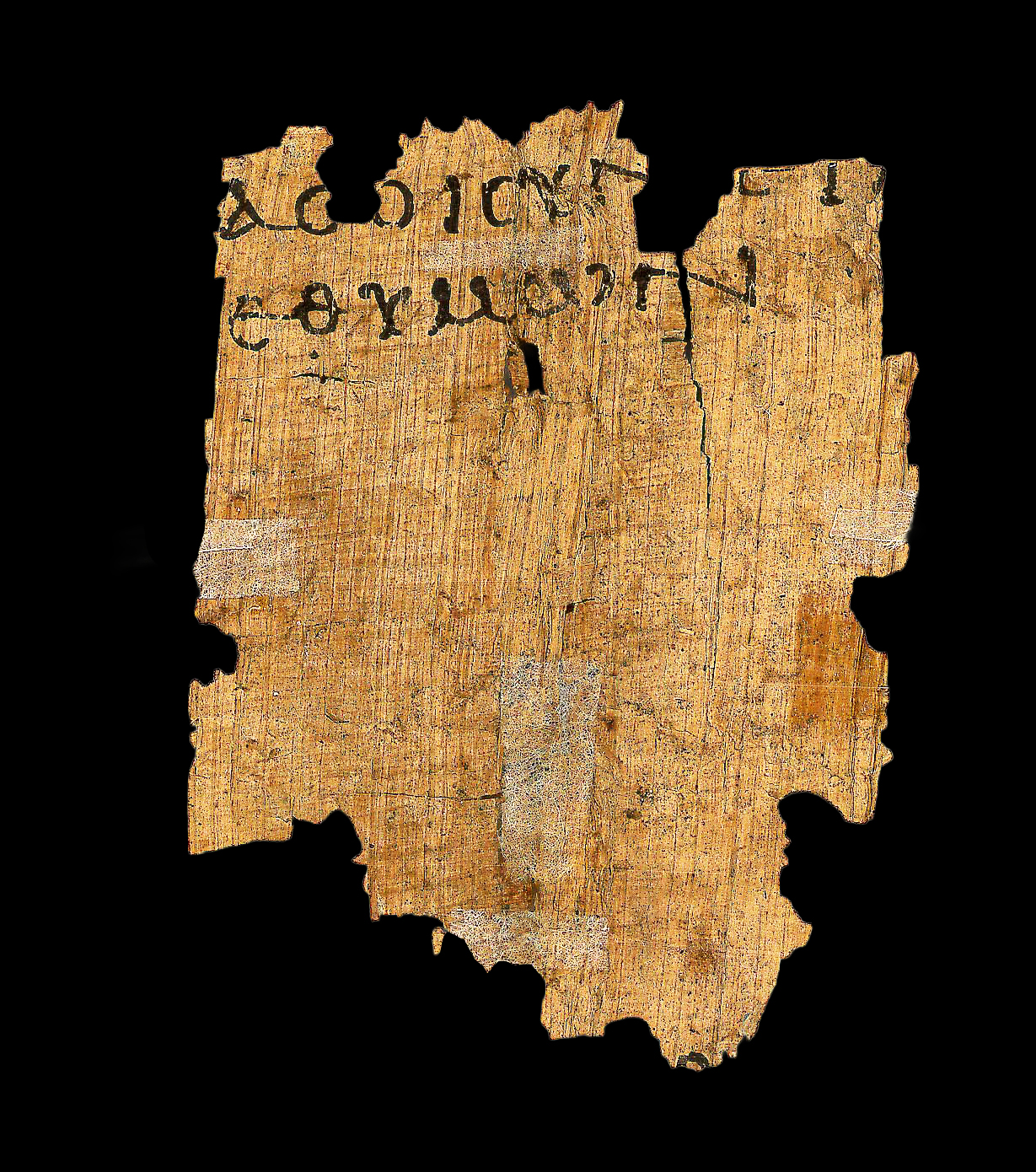
Verso

The Greek text of this codex is a representative of the Alexandrian text-type (or proto-Alexandrian). Aland ascribed it as "Normal text", and placed it in Category I.

It is currently housed at the University of Cologne (P. Col. theol. 12) in Cologne.

== See also ==
- List of New Testament papyri
