= Rylands Library Papyrus P52 =

Earliest surviving manuscript of the New Testament

Papyrus 𝔓^{52}
- New Testament manuscript
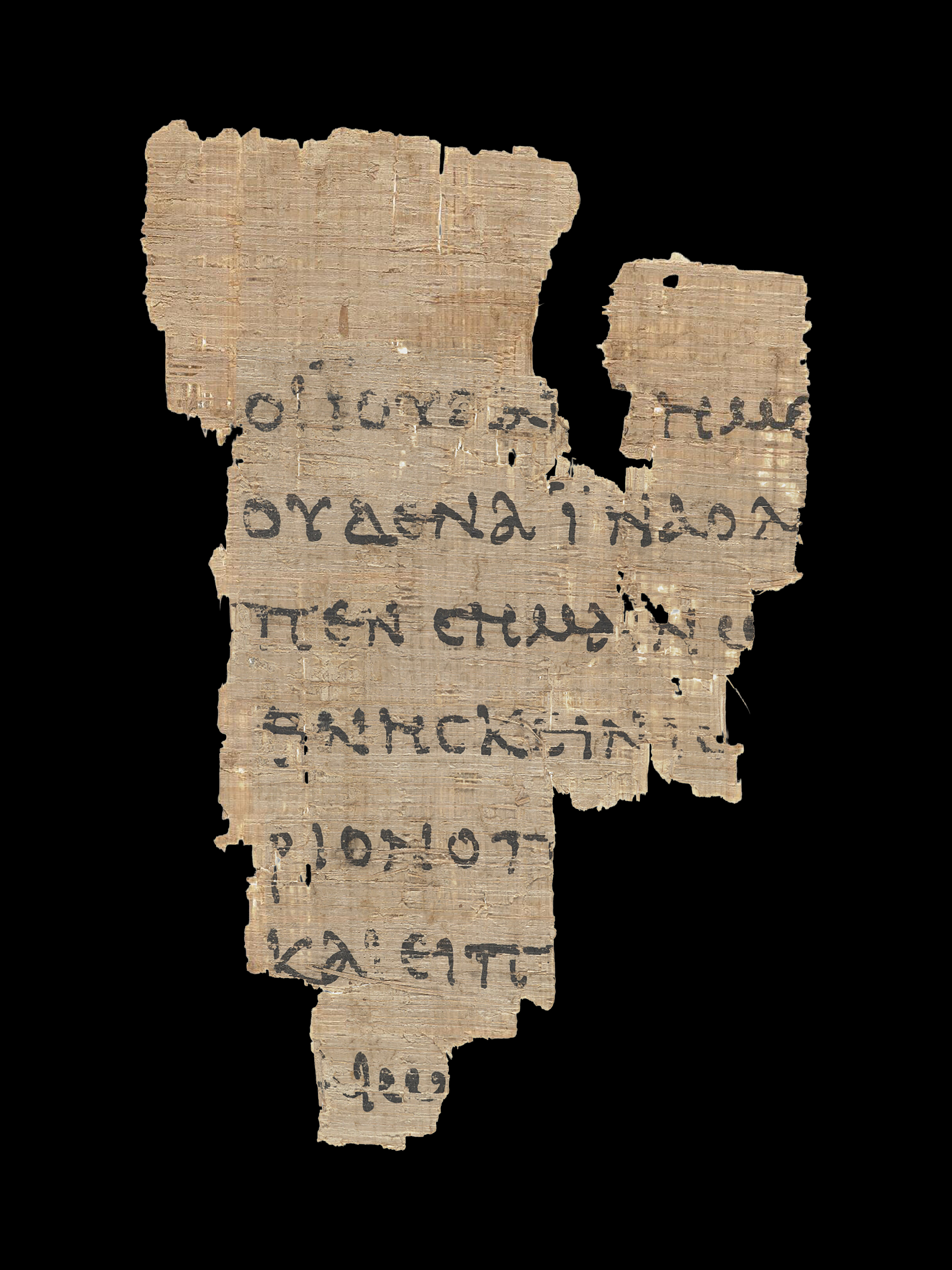
- P52 recto, John 18:31-33
- Text: John 18:31–33, 18:37–38
- Date: Uncertain; usually early–mid 2nd c., possibly late 1st–early 3rd c.
- Script: Greek
- Found: Egypt
- Now at: John Rylands University Library
- Cite: C. H. Roberts, An Unpublished Fragment of the Fourth Gospel in the John Rylands Library from the Bible (Manchester University Press, 1935)
- Size: 8.9 by 6 centimetres (3.5 in × 2.4 in)
- Type: Alexandrian text-type
- Category: I

The Rylands Library Papyrus P52, also known as the St John's fragment and with an accession reference of Papyrus Rylands Greek 457, is a fragment from a papyrus codex, measuring 3.5 by 2.5 inches (8.9 cm × 6.4 cm) at its widest (about the size of a credit card), and conserved with the Rylands Papyri at the John Rylands University Library Manchester, UK. The front (recto) contains parts of seven lines from the Gospel of John 18:31–33, in Greek, and the back (verso) contains parts of seven lines from verses 37–38.

Although Rylands 𝔓^{52} (in the Gregory-Aland numbering) is generally accepted as the earliest extant record of a canonical New Testament text, the dating of the papyrus is still debated. The original editor proposed a date range of 100–150 CE, while a recent exercise by Pasquale Orsini and Willy Clarysse, aiming to generate consistent revised date estimates for all New Testament papyri written before the mid-4th century, has proposed a date for 𝔓^{52} of 125–175 CE. A few scholars say that considering the difficulty of fixing the date of a fragment based solely on paleographic evidence allows the possibility of dates outside these range estimates, such that "any serious consideration of the window of possible dates for P52 must include dates in the later second and early third centuries."

The fragment of papyrus was among a group acquired on the Egyptian market in 1920 by Bernard Grenfell, who chose several fragments for the Rylands Library and began work on preparing them for publication before becoming too ill to complete the task. Colin H. Roberts later continued this work and published the first transcription and translation of the fragment in 1935. Roberts found comparator hands in dated papyrus documents between the late 1st and mid 2nd centuries, with the largest concentration of Hadrianic date (117 CE to 138 CE). Since this gospel text would be unlikely to have reached Egypt before c. 100 CE, he proposed a date in the first half of the 2nd century. Roberts proposed the closest match to 𝔓^{52} as being an undated papyrus of the Iliad conserved in Berlin; and in the 70 years since Roberts's essay the estimated date of this primary comparator hand has been confirmed as being around 100 CE, but other dated comparator hands have also since been suggested, with dates ranging into the second half of the 2nd century, and even into the 3rd century.

== Greek text ==
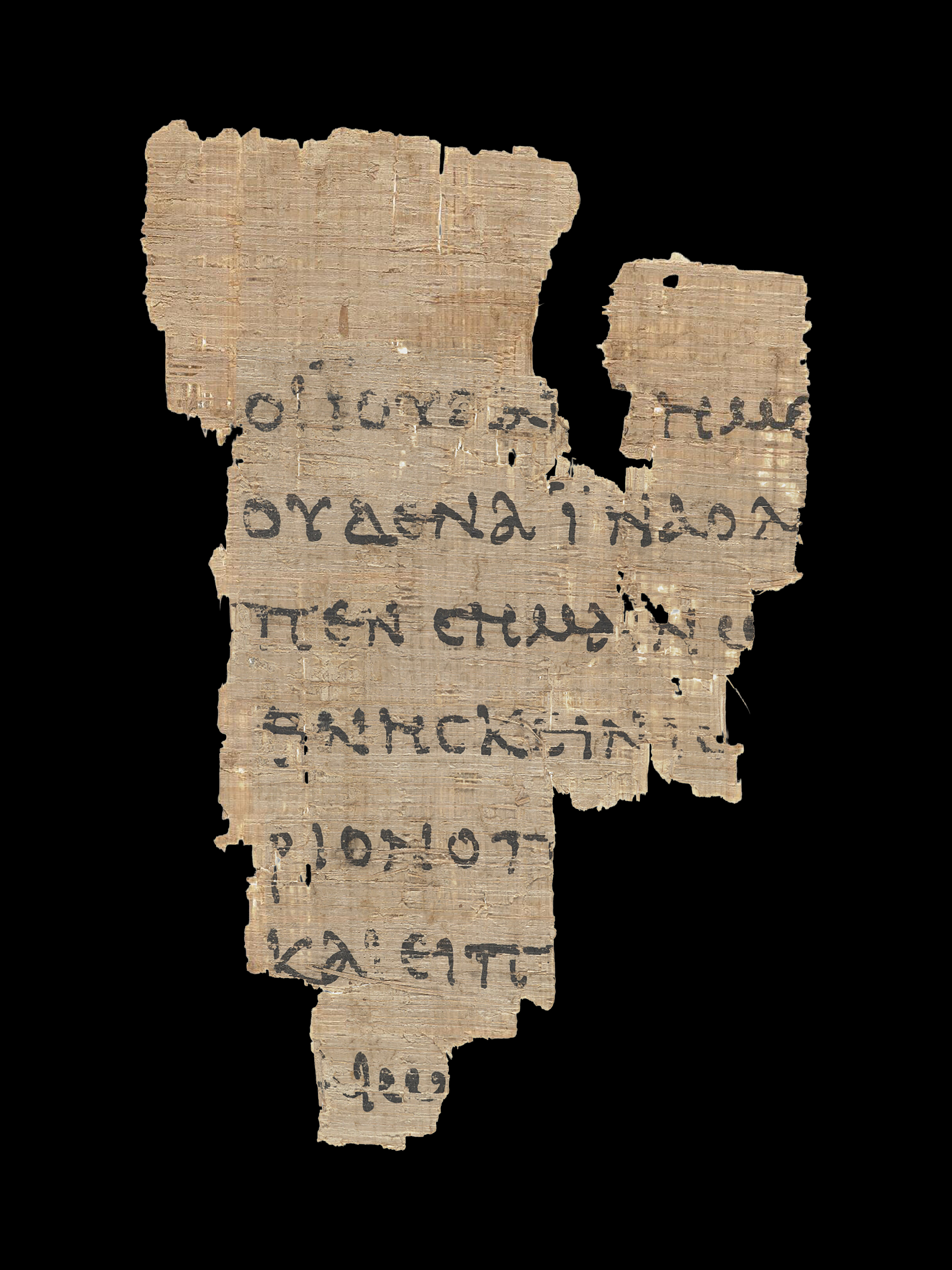
P52 recto, John 18:31-33

The papyrus is written on both sides and hence must be from a codex, a sewn and folded book, not a scroll, roll or isolated sheet; and the surviving portion also includes part of the top and inner margins of the page. The recto consequently preserves the top left corner of a right-hand page; while the verso preserves the top right corner of a left-hand page. The characters in bold style are the ones that can be seen in Papyrus 𝔓^{52}. The recto text comes from the Gospel of John 18:31–33:

ΟΙ ΙΟΥΔΑΙΟΙ ΗΜΕΙΝ ΟΥΚ ΕΞΕΣΤΙΝ ΑΠΟΚΤΕΙΝΑΙ
ΟΥΔΕΝΑ ΙΝΑ Ο ΛΟΓΟΣ ΤΟΥ ΙΗΣΟΥ ΠΛΗΡΩΘΗ ΟΝ ΕΙ-
ΠΕΝ ΣΗΜΑΙΝΩΝ ΠΟΙΩ ΘΑΝΑΤΩ ΗΜΕΛΛΕΝ ΑΠΟ-
ΘΝΗΣΚΕΙΝ ΙΣΗΛΘΕΝ ΟΥΝ ΠΑΛΙΝ ΕΙΣ ΤΟ ΠΡΑΙΤΩ-
ΡΙΟΝ Ο ΠΙΛΑΤΟΣ ΚΑΙ ΕΦΩΝΗΣΕΝ ΤΟΝ ΙΗΣΟΥΝ
ΚΑΙ ΕΙΠΕΝ ΑΥΤΩ ΣΥ ΕΙ O ΒΑΣΙΛΕΥΣ ΤΩΝ ΙΟΥ-
ΔΑΙΩN

Eleven lines of the text are lost, containing 18:34–36. The text translates as:

...
the Jews, "For us it is not permitted to kill
anyone," so that the word of Jesus might be fulfilled, which he sp-
oke signifying what kind of death he was going to
die. Entered therefore again into the Praeto-
rium Pilate and summoned Jesus
and said to him, "Thou art king of the
Jews?"

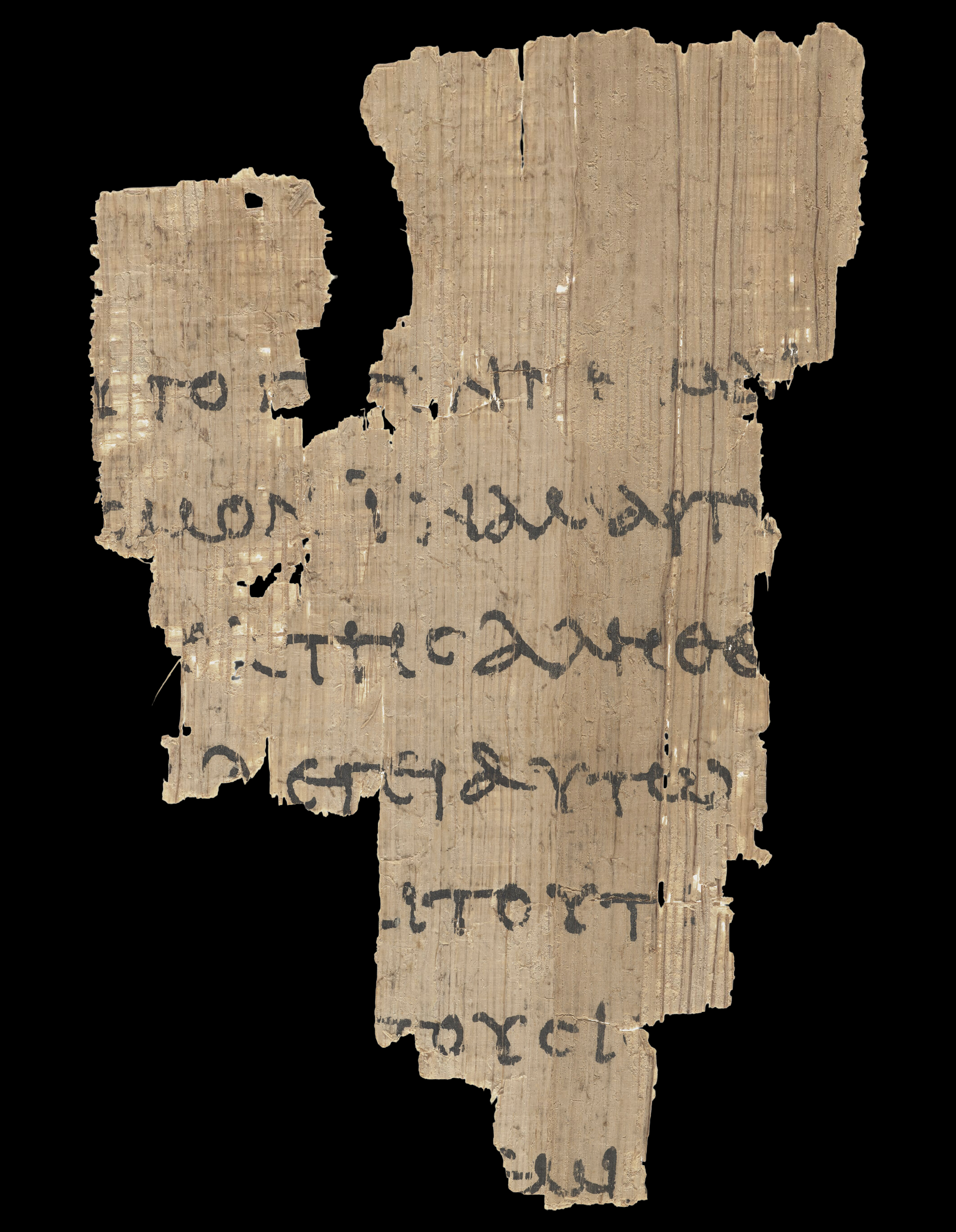
P52 verso, John 18:37-38

The verso text comes from the Gospel of John, 18:37–38:

ΒΑΣΙΛΕΥΣ ΕΙΜΙ ΕΓΩ ΕΙΣ TOΥΤΟ ΓΕΓΕΝΝΗΜΑΙ
ΚΑΙ (ΕΙΣ ΤΟΥΤΟ) ΕΛΗΛΥΘΑ ΕΙΣ ΤΟΝ ΚΟΣΜΟΝ ΙΝΑ ΜΑΡΤΥ-
ΡΗΣΩ ΤΗ ΑΛΗΘΕΙΑ ΠΑΣ Ο ΩΝ ΕΚ ΤΗΣ ΑΛΗΘΕI-
ΑΣ ΑΚΟΥΕΙ ΜΟΥ ΤΗΣ ΦΩΝΗΣ ΛΕΓΕΙ ΑΥΤΩ
Ο ΠΙΛΑΤΟΣ ΤΙ ΕΣΤΙΝ ΑΛΗΘΕΙΑ ΚΑΙ ΤΟΥΤΟ
ΕΙΠΩΝ ΠΑΛΙΝ ΕΞΗΛΘΕΝ ΠΡΟΣ ΤΟΥΣ ΙΟΥ-
ΔΑΙΟΥΣ ΚΑΙ ΛΕΓΕΙ ΑΥΤΟΙΣ ΕΓΩ ΟΥΔΕΜΙΑΝ
ΕΥΡΙΣΚΩ ΕΝ ΑΥΤΩ ΑΙΤΙΑΝ

The text translates as:

...
a King I am. For this I have been born
and (for this) I have come into the world so that I would test
ify to the truth. Everyone who is of the truth
hears of me my voice." Said to him
Pilate, "What is truth?" and this
having said, again he went out unto the Jews
and said to them, "I find not one
fault in him."

There appears insufficient room for the repeated phrase (ΕΙΣ ΤΟΥΤΟ) in the second line of the verso, and it is suggested that these words were inadvertently dropped through haplography.

The writing is generously scaled – letter forms vary between 0.3–0.4 cm (0.12–0.16 in) in height, lines are spaced approximately 0.5 cm (0.20 in) apart, and there is a margin of 2 cm (0.79 in) at the top. It can be determined that there were 18 lines to a page. C. H. Roberts commented: "... to judge from the spacing and the size of the text, it is unlikely that the format was affected by considerations of economy". There are no apparent punctuation marks or breathings shown in the fragment; but the diaeresis is applied to an initial iota at both the second line of the recto and the second line of the verso; and possibly too on the first line of the recto. Taken together with the over-scaled writing, this suggests that the manuscript may have been intended for congregational reading. If the original codex did indeed contain the entire text of the canonical Gospel of John, it would have constituted a single quire book of around 130 pages (i.e. 33 large folded papyrus sheets written on both sides); measuring approximately 21 cm × 20 cm (8.3 in × 7.9 in) when closed. Roberts noted a glued vertical join in the papyrus slightly inside the inner margin and visible on the verso, indicating that the large sheets used for the codex were likely to have been specially prepared for the purpose, each having been constructed from two standard sized sheets measuring approximately 21 cm × 16 cm (8.3 in × 6.3 in), with a central narrower sheet approximately 21 cm × 8 cm (8.3 in × 3.1 in) constituting the spine. Roberts describes the handwriting as "heavy, rounded and rather elaborate", but nevertheless not the work of "a practised scribe" (i.e. not a professional bookhand). Roberts notes comments that had recently been made by the editors of the Egerton Gospel (P.Egerton 2); and says similarly it could be said of 𝔓^{52} that it "has a somewhat informal air about it and with no claims to fine writing is yet a careful piece of work".

In total, 114 legible letters are visible on the two sides of the fragment, representing 18 out of the 24 letters of the Greek alphabet; beta, zeta, xi, phi, chi, and psi being missing. Roberts noted that the writing is painstaking and rather laboured, with instances of individual letters formed using several strokes "with a rather clumsy effect" (e.g. the lunate sigma ('Ϲ') at line three of the recto, and the eta ('H') immediately following it). Several letters are inclined to stray away from the notional upper and lower writing lines. Another peculiarity is that there are two distinct forms of the letter alpha ('Α'); most are formed from a separate loop and diagonal stroke, where the top of the stroke has a distinctive decorative arch while the bottom is hooked; but on the fourth line of the verso there is a smaller alpha formed by a single spiralling loop with no arch or hooks. Also present in two forms is the letter upsilon ('Υ'); the more common form is constructed from two strokes, each stroke terminating in a decorative hook or finial (see the second line of the recto); but on the fourth line of the verso is an upsilon formed from a single looped stroke with no decoration. These observations support Roberts's supposition that the scribe was an educated person writing carefully in imitation of a calligraphic hand, rather than a professional scribe writing to order; such that, on occasion, the writer inadvertently reverted to the undecorated (and often smaller) letter forms of his everyday hand.

Roberts noted that in addition to alpha and upsilon, other letters also tend to be given decorative hooks, especially iota ('Ι') and omega ('Ω') (both seen in the seventh line of the recto). He also drew attention to the forms of epsilon ('Ε') (with an extended cross-stroke a little above the centre-line, as in the fourth line of the verso), delta ('Δ') (with a decorative arch, as in the first and second lines of the recto) and mu ('Μ') (with a central stroke dipping down to the baseline, as in the third line of the recto). Nongbri confirms Roberts observations, and also notes distinctive forms of rho ('Ρ') (with a small head and an undecorated downstroke extending well below the lower line, as in the second line of the verso), pi ('Π') (with an extended horizontal stroke, as in the third line of the recto) and kappa ('Κ') (formed like the looped upsilon with an additional downwards stroke, as in the fourth line of the recto). Aside from their sometimes clumsy construction, the sigma and eta are also distinctive in form; the sigma facing fully to the right, and the eta having a distinctive high cross stroke.

In 1977, Roberts surveyed 14 papyri believed to be of Christian origin – 12 codices and two scrolls – comprising all the Christian manuscripts then commonly assessed as likely having a 2nd century date, including 𝔓^{52}. He considered that only three of these texts had a calligraphic bookhand, such as was then standard in formal manuscripts of Greek literature, or in most Graeco-Jewish biblical scrolls. Of the other eleven, including 𝔓^{52}, he states that their scribes were:

...not trained in calligraphy and so not accustomed to writing books, though they were familiar with them; they employ what is basically a documentary hand but at the same time they are aware that it is a book and not a document on which they are engaged. They are not personal or private hands; and in most a degree of regularity and of clarity is aimed at and achieved. Such hands may be described as "reformed documentary". (One advantage for the paleographer in such hands is that with their close links to the documents they are somewhat less difficult to date than purely calligraphic hands).

It may be added that the codex of 𝔓^{52}, with its good quality papyrus, wide margins, large clear even upright letters, short lines in continuous script, decorative hooks and finials, and bilinear writing, would have presented an overall appearance not far from that of professionally written Christian codices such as 𝔓^{64} or 𝔓^{77}, even though its actual letter forms are not as fine, and are closer to documentary exemplars.

== Date ==
The significance of 𝔓^{52} rests both upon its proposed early dating and upon its geographic dispersal from the presumed site of authorship, traditionally thought to have been Ephesus. As the fragment is removed from the autograph by at least one step of transmission, the date of authorship for the Gospel of John must be at least a few years prior to the writing of 𝔓^{52}, whenever that may have been. The location of the fragment in Egypt extends that time even further, allowing for the dispersal of the documents from the point of authorship and transmission to the point of discovery. The Gospel of John is perhaps quoted by Justin Martyr, and hence is highly likely to have been written before c. 160 CE; but 20th century New Testament scholars, most influentially Kurt Aland and Bruce Metzger, have argued from the proposed dating of 𝔓^{52} prior to this, that the latest possible date for the composition of the Gospel should be pushed back into the early decades of the second century; some scholars indeed arguing that the discovery of 𝔓^{52} implies a date of composition for the Gospel no later than the traditionally accepted date of c. 90 CE, or even earlier.

Scepticism about the use of 𝔓^{52} to date the Gospel of John (not about the fragment's authenticity) is based on two issues. First, the papyrus has been dated based on the handwriting alone, without the support of dated textual references or associated archeology. Secondly, like all other surviving early Gospel manuscripts, this fragment is from a codex, not a scroll. If it dates from the first half of the second century, this fragment would be amongst the earlier surviving examples of a literary codex. (Around 90 CE, Martial circulated his poems in parchment codex form, presenting this as a novelty.) The year before Roberts published 𝔓^{52}, the British Museum library had acquired papyrus fragments of the Egerton Gospel (P.Egerton 2) which are also from a codex, and these were published in 1935 by H. Idris Bell and T.C. Skeat. Since the text of 𝔓^{52} is that of a canonical gospel, the Gospel of John, whereas that of the Egerton Gospel is not, there was considerable interest amongst biblical scholars as to whether 𝔓^{52} could be dated as the earlier of the two papyri.

=== Colin Roberts ===
𝔓^{52} is a literary text and, in common with almost all such papyri, has no explicit indicator of date. Proposing a date for it ultimately required comparison with dated texts, which tend to be in documentary hands (contracts, petitions, letters). Nevertheless, Roberts suggested two undated literary papyri as the closest comparators to 𝔓^{52}: P. Berol. 6845 (a fragment of an Iliad scroll conserved in Berlin and dated paleographically to around the end of the first century) which he suggested (other than in the form of the letter alpha) is "the closest parallel to our text that I have been able to find, a view that I was glad to find shared by so great an authority as Sir Frederic Kenyon"; and P.Egerton 2 itself, which was then estimated to date around 150 CE. Roberts stated that in the Egerton Gospel, "most of the characteristics of our hand are to be found, though in a less accentuated form"; and he particularly noted similar forms of upsilon, mu and delta.

Establishing the Berlin Iliad P. Berol 6845 as a comparator was key to Roberts proposing an early 2nd century date as plausible for 𝔓^{52}; as the Berlin papyrus had been dated to the end of the first century by Wilhelm Schubart, in a landmark papyrological study which demonstrated the close similarity of its hand to that of P. Fayum 110, a personal letter, but written by a professional scribe in a "literary type" hand and with an explicit date of 94 CE. In proposing a date of around the middle of the second century for P. Egerton 2, Skeat and Bell had also relied on comparison with P.Fayum 110; together with Abb 34 (now known as B.G.U. 1.22 and dated ca. 110–117 CE), a letter in a documentary hand of the time of Trajan; and P.Lond. 1.130, a horoscope of late first or early second century date. The Berlin Iliad has since been re-edited in the light of more recent discoveries, but confirming Schubart's conclusions as to its dating around 100 CE, and its close relationship to the dated literary type hand of P.Fayum 110; and it remains a primary exemplar of a particularly distinctive form of first/early second century CE calligraphic book hand. Roberts in turn was also to advance P. Fayum 110 and Abb 34 (though not P.Lond. 1.130) as dated comparators to 𝔓^{52}, identifying P. Fayum 110 as the "most important parallel" he could find among dated documents, and noting in particular that both of these showed the same two forms of alpha in simultaneous use. Nongbri notes other instances where the letter forms in P. Fayum 110 are a closer match to those in 𝔓^{52} than are the counterpart forms in P. Berol 6845; specifically delta, pi, rho and epsilon. In his later career, Roberts reasserted the close resemblance of P. Fayum 110 to both 𝔓^{52} and P. Egerton 2.

Roberts also proposed two further dated papyri in documentary hands as comparators for 𝔓^{52}: P. London 2078, a private letter written in the reign of Domitian (81–96 CE), and P. Oslo 22, a petition dated 127 CE; noting that P. Oslo 22 was most similar in some of the more distinctive letter forms, e.g. eta, mu and iota. Roberts circulated his assessment to Frederic G. Kenyon, Wilhelm Schubart and H. I. Bell; all concurred with his dating of 𝔓^{52} in the first half of the 2nd century. Kenyon suggested another comparator in P. Flor 1. 1, a loan contract dated 153 CE; but Roberts did not consider the similarity to be very close, other than for particular letters, as the overall style of that hand was cursive. In the same year 1935, Roberts's assessment of date was supported by the independent studies of A. Deissmann, who, while producing no actual evidence, suggested a date in the reigns of Hadrian (117–138) or even Trajan (98–117). In 1936 the dating was supported by Ulrich Wilcken on the basis of a comparison between the hand of 𝔓^{52} and those of papyri in the extensive Apollonius archive which are dated 113–120.

=== Philip Comfort ===
Subsequently, other comparator literary papyri have been suggested, notably P. Oxy. XXXI 2533, where a literary text of the second century in a hand proposed as very close to 𝔓^{52} is found written on the back of a re-used document in a late first century business hand; and also three biblical papyrus codices; P. Oxy. LX 4009 (an apocryphal gospel fragment, dated paleographically to the early/mid second century); and P. Oxy. L 3523 (𝔓^{90}) and P. Oxy. LXIV 4404 (𝔓^{104}) both dated paleographically to the later second century. In addition, the discovery of other papyrus codices with second century hands, such as the Yale Genesis Fragment (P. Yale 1), suggested that this form of book was more common for literary texts at this date than had previously been assumed. Consequently, until the 1990s, the tendency amongst New Testament commentators, supported by several paleographers such as Philip W. Comfort, had been to suggest a date for 𝔓^{52} towards the earlier half of the range suggested by Roberts and his correspondents. However, a cautionary note was raised by the discovery that a papyrus fragment in Cologne constitutes part of the Egerton Gospel. In this fragment the letters gamma and kappa are separated by an hooked apostrophe, a feature infrequent in dated second century papyri; which accordingly has been taken as implying a date for the Egerton Gospel closer to 200 CE – and indicating the perils of ascribing a date for a papyrus text of which only a small part of two pages survives.

=== Brent Nongbri ===
The early date for 𝔓^{52} favoured by many New Testament scholars has been challenged by Andreas Schmidt, who favours a date around 170 CE, plus or minus twenty-five years; on the basis of a comparison with Chester Beatty Papyri X and III, and with the redated Egerton Gospel. Brent Nongbri has criticized both Comfort's early dating of 𝔓^{52} and Schmidt's late dating, dismissing as unsound all attempts to establish a date for such undated papyri within narrow ranges on purely paleographic grounds, along with any inference from the paleographic dating of 𝔓^{52} to a precise terminus ad quem for the composition of the Fourth Gospel. In particular Nongbri noted that both Comfort and Schmidt propose their respective revisions of Roberts's dating solely on the basis of paleographic comparisons with papyri that had themselves been paleographically dated. As a corrective to both tendencies, Nongbri collected and published images of all explicitly dated comparator manuscripts to 𝔓^{52}; demonstrating that, although Roberts's assessment of similarities with a succession of dated late first to mid second century papyri could be confirmed, two later dated papyri, both petitions, also showed strong similarities (P. Mich. inv. 5336, dated around 152 CE; and P.Amh. 2.78, an example first suggested by Eric Turner, that dates to 184 CE). Nongbri states "The affinities in letter forms between (P. Mich. inv. 5336) and 𝔓^{52} are as close as any of Roberts's documentary parallels", and that P.Amh. 2.78 "is as good a parallel to 𝔓^{52} as any of these adduced by Roberts". Nongbri also produces dated documents of the later second and early third centuries, each of which display similarities to 𝔓^{52} in some of their letter forms. Nongbri suggests that this implied that older styles of handwriting might persist much longer than some scholars had assumed, and that a prudent margin of error must allow a still wider range of possible dates for the papyrus:

What emerges from this survey is nothing surprising to papyrologists: paleography is not the most effective method for dating texts, particularly those written in a literary hand. Roberts himself noted this point in his edition of 𝔓^{52}. The real problem is the way scholars of the New Testament have used and abused papyrological evidence. I have not radically revised Roberts's work. I have not provided any third-century documentary papyri that are absolute "dead ringers" for the handwriting of 𝔓^{52}, and even had I done so, that would not force us to date P52 at some exact point in the third century. Paleographic evidence does not work that way. What I have done is to show that any serious consideration of the window of possible dates for P52 must include dates in the later second and early third centuries. Thus, P52 cannot be used as evidence to silence other debates about the existence (or non-existence) of the Gospel of John in the first half of the second century. Only a papyrus containing an explicit date or one found in a clear archaeological stratigraphic context could do the work scholars want P52 to do. As it stands now, the papyrological evidence should take a second place to other forms of evidence in addressing debates about the dating of the Fourth Gospel.

Nongbri resists offering his own opinion on the date of 𝔓^{52}, but apparently approves the relatively cautious terminology both of Roberts's dating, "On the whole, we may accept with some confidence the first half of the second century as the period in which (𝔓^{52}) was most probably written"; and also of Roberts's speculations on possible implications for the date of John's gospel, "But all we can safely say is that this fragment tends to support those critics who favour an early date (late first to early second century) for the composition of the Gospel rather than those who would still regard it as a work of the middle decades of the second century". Nevertheless, and notwithstanding Nongbri's statement to the contrary, some commentators have interpreted his accumulation of later dated comparators as undermining Roberts's proposed dating; but such interpretations fail to take into account the essential similarity of Roberts's and Nongbri's main findings. Roberts identified the closest parallels to 𝔓^{52} as being P. Berol 6845 and P. Egerton 2, then dated paleographically to 100 CE and 150 CE respectively; and proposed that the most probable date for 𝔓^{52} would lie in between these two. Nongbri rejects paleographically dated comparators on principle, and consequently proposes the closest dated parallels to 𝔓^{52} as being P. Fayum 110 of 94 CE, P.Mich. inv. 5336 of ca. 152 CE and P.Amh. 2.78 of 184 CE; each, he suggests, as close to 𝔓^{52} as the others, and all three closer than any other dated comparator. The consequence is to extend the range of dated primary reference comparators both earlier and later than in Roberts work; and Nongbri stresses that, simply from paleographic evidence, the actual date of 𝔓^{52} could conceivably be later (or earlier) still. Although Nongbri is concerned to demonstrate that the possibility of a late second (or early third) century date for 𝔓^{52} cannot be discounted, his chief criticism is directed at those subsequent commentators and scholars who have tended to take the midpoint of Roberts's proposed range of dates, treat it as the latest limit for a possible date for this papyrus, and then infer from this that the Gospel of John cannot have been written later than around 100 CE. .

=== Stanley Porter ===
The relationship of 𝔓^{52} to P.Egerton 2 has been further re-examined in detail by Stanley E. Porter. Porter offers two further comparator early biblical papyri for both texts, P. Oxy IV 656 (a fragment of Genesis) and P.Vindob. G. 2325 (another apocryphal gospel, the Fayum Fragment); and provides a wide-ranging survey of the history and range of opinion amongst papyrologists for the dating of 𝔓^{52} and P.Egerton 2, presenting arguments to support Robert's judgement that the two are close parallels, that they are unlikely to be of widely separate dates, and that 𝔓^{52} is more likely the earlier. Specifically he notes that P.Egerton 2 is in "a less heavy hand with more formal rounded characteristics, but with what the original editors called "cursive affinities"." Porter adds that "Both manuscripts were apparently written before the development of a more formal Biblical majuscule style, which began to develop in the late second and early third centuries." In this respect, Porter also notes that although the hooked apostrophe form found in the Cologne fragment of P.Egerton 2 is unusual in the second century, there is at least one known dated example in a papyrus of 101 CE and three others of mid or late second century date. "The result is to bring the two manuscripts together, somewhere in the middle of the second century, perhaps tending towards the early part of it."

Stanley Porter has also questioned Nongbri's assertion that valid comparisons can be made between 𝔓^{52} and documentary papyri of the later second and early third centuries; noting the warning from Eric Turner that, "Comparison of book hands with dated documentary hands will be less reliable, the intention of the scribe is different in the two cases." and in respect of this Porter cautions against what he terms Nongbri's 'overly skeptical' insistence on disregarding comparators without an explicit date, forcing comparators for literary texts inappropriately to be confined to purely documentary hands. Porter suggests that Nongbri's proposed late second and third century comparators are in several cases quite different from 𝔓^{52} so that they force comparison to focus on detailed letter forms without consideration of the overall formation, trajectory and style of the script. If, rather than undertaking comparisons document by document, typological letter comparisons are instead applied using published series of dated representative script alphabets, then, Porter asserts, both 𝔓^{52} and P.Egerton 2 "fit comfortably within the second century. There are of course some letters that are similar to those in the third century (as there are some in the first century) but the letters that tend to be given the most individualization, such as alpha, mu and even sigma, appear to be second century." Both Porter and Nongbri note that Eric Turner, notwithstanding his proposal of P.Amh. 2.78 as a parallel for 𝔓^{52}, nevertheless continued to maintain that "The Rylands papyrus may therefore be accepted as of the first half of the second century". Nongbri has subsequently pointed out the limited usefulness of Porter's study due to the fact that it makes no reference to manuscripts with secure dates and thus is entirely circular (several undated manuscripts are used to provide a date for another undated manuscript).

=== Don Barker ===
An altogether different approach to dating New Testament papyri has been proposed by a number of paleographers in recent years, drawing on the notion of "graphic stream" developed by Guglielmo Cavallo. Rather than comparing letter forms of undated papyri directly with dated comparators, it is proposed that the hand in question should first be identified to a graphic stream representing the overall development of a particular handwriting style. "The way that individual letters are formed within these graphic streams is secondary to the overall style of the script". Don Barker, reviewing the proposed comparators and range of datings that have been advanced over the years for 𝔓^{52}, maintains that this papyrus can be placed in a "round block script" graphic stream that is attested from the first century onwards; and notes eleven dated examples ranging from P.Oxy. 3466 (81–96 CE) to P.Oxy.3183 (292 CE) and including all the later parallels proposed by Nongbri and Turner as well as P.Fayum 110 (94 CE) from Roberts's original study. Otherwise, however, Barker rejects from this graphic stream all the other comparators proposed by Roberts and his correspondents, including P. Flor 1. 1 (153 CE). Barker maintains that the letter formation within this the graphic stream "appears to have great holding power", and proposes that it is consequently difficult to place 𝔓^{52} into a narrower time frame within it. " When the general style and individual letter features are kept in close connection and keeping in mind how a scribe writing a documentary text may write a literary text differently, it would seem from the above dated manuscripts, that a date of the second or third century could be assigned to P.Ryl. 457"."

=== Pasquale Orsini and Willy Clarysse ===
Pasquale Orsini and Willy Clarysse also adopt the "graphic stream" approach; and have applied it to reviewing the dating for all New Testament manuscripts proposed as having been written before the mid-fourth century, including 𝔓^{52}. Since none of these papyri and parchments carry explicit dates, all must be dated paleographically; so Orsini and Clarysse propose that manuscript comparisons for such paleographic dating should be made only between hands that are similar to one another. However, and in contrast to Don Barker, their classification of hands conforms rigorously to the typology of Hellenistic Greek handwriting styles developed by Guglielmo Cavallo; applying his categorisation of hands into 'styles', 'stylistic classes' or 'graphic types' as appropriate. Orsini and Clarysse propose dates for New Testament papyri that are often rather later than the consensus dates in the Nestle-Aland lists, and considerably later than the counterpart dates proposed by Comfort and Barrett. They criticise Don Barker for assigning dates they regard as extending too early; the dating ranges they themselves propose for New Testament papyri are never wider than 100 years, more frequently 50 years, and for several early papyri (𝔓^{46}, 𝔓^{95}, 𝔓^{64+67}) they propose purely paleographic dates within a 25-year range. In their paper Orsini and Clarysse state that the early parallels proposed for 𝔓^{52} by Comfort and Barrett are "inappropriate"; and, although they cite with approval Nongbri's assessment of the respective papyrological dating approaches adopted by Grenfell, Hunt and Roberts, they do not cite his specific study of 𝔓^{52}, and none of his proposed later parallels feature in their list of stylistically similar comparators; nor do any of other papyri advanced by Barker as representatives of his proposed graphic stream. Of the papyri discussed by Roberts and his correspondents, and in contradiction to Barker, Orsini and Clarysse maintain Kenyon's proposed dated parallel, P. Flor 1. 1 (153 CE) as corresponding to the same "Round Chancery Script" graphic type as 𝔓^{52}. Two further comparators they propose are PSI V 446, the official proclamation of an edict of the prefect Petronius dated 132–137 CE; and P. Fayum 87, a municipal receipt dated 156 CE; while they also note, as other commentators have done, the close similarity of 𝔓^{52} to 𝔓^{104} for which they propose a date of 100–200 CE. Consequently, Orsini and Clarysse propose 125 to 175 CE as the range of dates for 𝔓^{52}; which corresponds with the "mid second century" date proposed Stanley Porter, is much narrower than the ranges envisaged by Barker or Nongbri, and implies within their dating schema that 𝔓^{52} and 𝔓^{104} stand as the earliest New Testament papyri so far identified (although, strangely, at the conclusion of their article, Orsini and Clarysse state that 𝔓^{52}, 𝔓^{90}, and 𝔓^{104} "probably all [date to] the second half of the second century)."

=== John Rylands Library ===
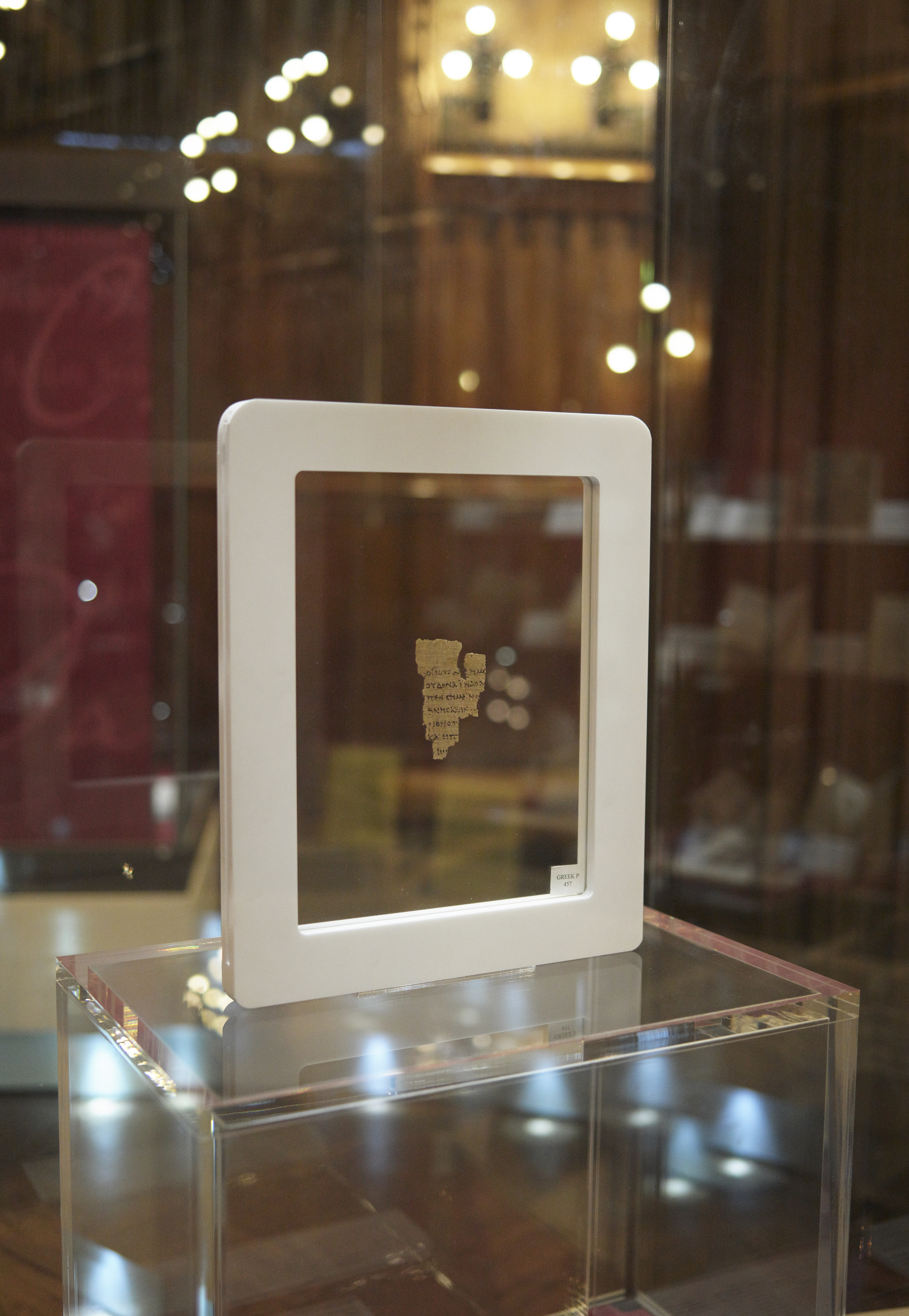
Rylands Greek P 457, The St John Fragment, On display in the Rylands Gallery at John Rylands Library in Manchester, England

The John Rylands Library states "The first editor dated the Fragment to the first half of the second century (between 100–150 AD). The date was estimated palaeographically, by comparing the handwriting with other manuscripts. However, palaeography is not an exact science – none of the comparable Biblical manuscripts are dated and most papyri bearing a secure date are administrative documents. Recent research points to a date nearer to 200 AD, but there is as yet no convincing evidence that any earlier fragments from the New Testament survive. Carbon-dating is a destructive method and has not been used on the Fragment."

== Text-critical and historical significance ==
Finds of early Christian papyri from Egypt represent the earliest surviving indisputable physical evidence for Christianity and the Gospels. There is a considerable degree of overlap in the proposed ranges of dates for these papyri, and consequently it cannot be stated categorically that 𝔓^{52} is earlier than other New Testament fragments of apparent 2nd century date, such as 𝔓^{90}, 𝔓^{104} and 𝔓^{64+67}; it also cannot be stated categorically that it is earlier than some early apocryphal texts, such as P. Egerton. 2, P.Oxy. LX 4009. There are, in addition, a number of papyrus fragments of Old Testament books in Greek (chiefly Psalms) which have also been dated to the 2nd century, and whose characteristics have been advanced as indicating a Christian, rather than Jewish or pagan, origin. Nevertheless, since all of these papyri have been dated paleographically, and mostly with reference to the same dated documentary comparators, they may be considered as a manuscript cluster whose estimated dates will vary as a group, amongst which 𝔓^{52} is commonly recognised as having earlier features. Moreover, despite the small quantity of text, the text that survives in 𝔓^{52} is sufficient to provide early witness to a number of key historical claims about the Historical Jesus; though not mentioned by name, the verses in 𝔓^{52} show a man tried before the Roman authorities at a specific date (the governorship of Pontius Pilate), at a specific place (the Praetorium in Jerusalem), sentenced to a specific death (crucifixion), and all at the instigation of the Jewish Temple authorities.

If the early 2nd century dating of the 𝔓^{52} is in fact correct, then the fact that the fragment is from a codex rather than a scroll would testify to the very early adoption of this mode of writing amongst Christians, in stark contrast to the apparent practice of contemporary Judaism. Furthermore, an assessment of the length of 'missing' text between the recto and verso readings corresponds with that in the counterpart canonical Gospel of John; and hence confirms that there are unlikely to have been substantial additions or deletions in this whole portion. Other than two iotacisms (ΗΜΕΙΝ, ΙΣΗΛΘΕΝ), and in the probable omission of the second ΕΙΣ ΤΟΥΤΟ from line 2 of the verso, 𝔓^{52} agrees with the Alexandrian text base. In lines 4 and 5 of the recto, the reconstructed text reads "ΠΑΛΙΝ ΕΙΣ ΤΟ ΠΡΑΙΤΩΡΙΟΝ Ο ΠΙΛΑΤΟΣ", in agreement with 𝔓^{66} and with the Codex Vaticanus, whereas the Codex Sinaiticus, Codex Alexandrinus and the Majority Text all have the alternative word order of "ΕΙΣ ΤΟ ΠΡΑΙΤΩΡΙΟΝ ΠΑΛΙΝ Ο ΠΙΛΑΤΟΣ"; however, this is not considered a significant variant. Since this fragment is small – about 9 cm × 6 cm (3.5 in × 2.4 in) – it cannot be proven that it comes from a full copy of the Gospel of John, but it may be presumed that the original text was at least of near full gospel length, to be worth the extra care and time required in writing in codex form. On the other hand, the generous scale and format of the codex pages of 𝔓^{52} are such that it is highly unlikely that it could originally have comprised the four canonical gospels; Roberts calculated that such a codex might have required 576 pages.

=== Nomina Sacra ===
𝔓^{52} is small, and although a plausible reconstruction can be attempted for most of the 14 lines represented, the proportion of the text of the Gospel of John for which it provides a direct witness is necessarily limited, so it is rarely cited in textual debate. There has, however, been some contention as to whether the name 'ΙΗΣΟΥ' (Jesus) in the 'missing' portions of recto lines 2 and 5 was originally written as nomen sacrum; in other words, was it contracted to 'ΙΣ' or 'ΙΗΣ' in accordance with otherwise universal Christian practice in surviving early Gospel manuscripts. On the assumption that the nomina sacra were absent from 𝔓^{52}, Roberts originally considered that the divine name was more likely to have been written in full, but later changed his mind. This latter view is also the view of Larry W. Hurtado, with Christopher M. Tuckett maintaining Roberts' original opinion. The verses included in 𝔓^{52} are also witnessed in Bodmer Papyrus 𝔓^{66} – usually dated to the beginning of the 3rd century CE – and there is also some overlap with 𝔓^{60} and 𝔓^{90} of the 7th and 2nd centuries respectively. No two of the four contain the same exact text as reconstructed for John 18:31–38, but 𝔓^{52} seems to represent an example of the same proto-Alexandrian text-type. Kurt Aland described it as a "Normal text", and placed it in Category I, due to its age.

== First publication ==
- Roberts, C. H., ed. (1935). An Unpublished Fragment of the Fourth Gospel in the John Rylands Library. Manchester: Manchester University Press.

== See also ==
- 4Q108
- 4QMMT
- 7Q5
- John 18:38 (verso)
- List of New Testament papyri
- List of New Testament uncials

== Bibliography ==
- Barker, Don (2011) "The Dating of New Testament Papyri." New Testament Studies 57: 571–82.
- Hurtado, Larry W. (2003) "P52 (P.Rylands Gr 457) and the Nomina Sacra; Method and Probability." Tyndale Bulletin 54.1
- Nongbri, Brent (2005) "The Use and Abuse of P52: Papyrological Pitfalls in the Dating of the Fourth Gospel", Harvard Theological Review 98:1, 23–48.
- Nongbri, Brent (2020) "Palaeography, Precision and Publicity: Further Thoughts on P.Ryl. III.457 (P52)." New Testament Studies 66: 471–99.
- Orsini, Pasquale and Clarysse, Willy (2012) "Early New Testament Manuscripts and Their Dates; A Critique of Theological Palaeography", Ephemerides Theologicae Lovanienses 88/4, pp 443–474
- Porter, Stanley E. (2013) "Recent efforts to Reconstruct Early Christianity on the Basis of its Payrological Evidence" in Christian Origins and Graeco-Roman Culture, Eds Stanley Porter and Andrew Pitts, Leiden, Brill, pp 71–84.
- Roberts, C. H. (1935) An Unpublished Fragment of the Fourth Gospel in the John Rylands Library. Manchester University Press, 35pp.
- Roberts, C. H. (1979) Manuscript, Society and Belief in Early Christian Egypt, OUP.
- Schnelle, Udo (1998) The History and Theology of the New Testament Writings.
- Tuckett, Christopher M. (2001) "P52 and Nomina Sacra." New Testament Studies 47:544-48.
- Comfort, Philip W.; David P. Barrett (2001). The Text of the Earliest New Testament Greek Manuscripts. Wheaton, Illinois: Tyndale House Publishers. pp. 365–368. ISBN 978-0-8423-5265-9.
