= Stadio Giovanni Celeste =

Sports venue in Messina, Italy

Coordinates: 38°9′54″N 15°32′24″E

Stadio Comunale Giovanni Celeste
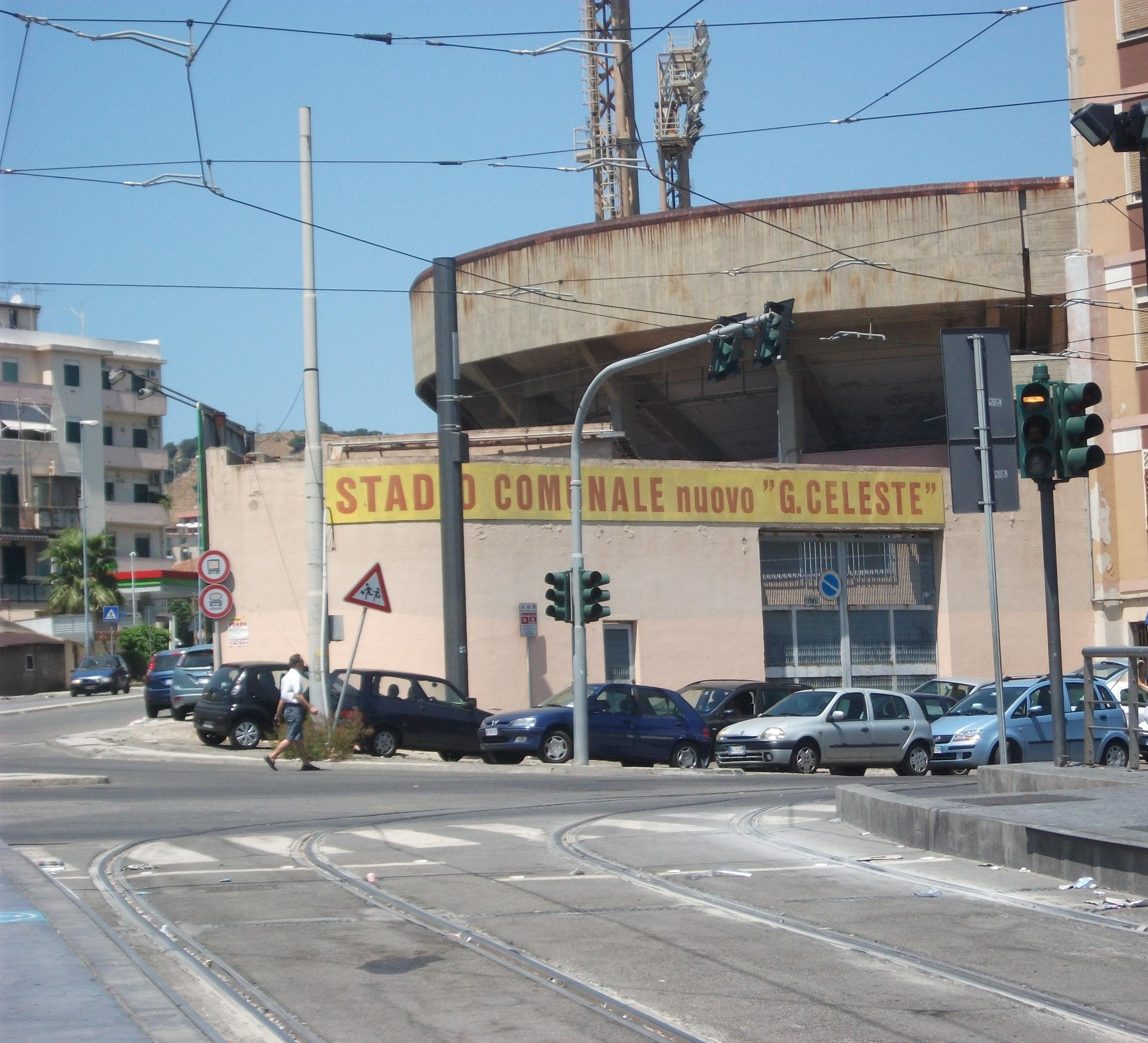
- Entrance
- Interactive map of Stadio Comunale; Giovanni Celeste
- Location: Messina, Italy
- Owner: Municipality of Messina
- Capacity: 11,900
- Surface: Grass; 105x68m

Construction
- Groundbreaking: 1931
- Opened: 1932

Tenants
- S.S.D. Città di Messina (2010–2014); A.C.R. Messina (1932–2004)

Stadio Comunale Giovanni Celeste is a multi-use stadium in Messina, Italy. Opened in 1932, it served as the home ground of ACR Messina until 2004, when the club moved to the Stadio San Filippo. From 2010 to 2014, the venue was used by Città di Messina (as known as Camaro). The stadium is able to hold 11,900 people.

== History ==
The stadium was named after Giovanni Celeste (1905–1943), an Italian serviceman who served in the Regia Marina during World War II.

It was used mostly for football matches and hosted Messina’s home matches from 1932 to 2004 of the former city teams. It ceased to be Messina’s home ground in 2004 when Stadio San Filippo opened and it was used by Città di Messina from 2010 to 2014 to host the home games of the new town club of S.S.D. Città di Messina that plays in Serie D.

On June 5, 1982, the stadium hosted a UEFA Euro 1984 qualifier between Malta and Iceland because Malta's own stadium in Gżira was not suitable for the match. Malta won the game 2–1 in front of a crowd of 1,271 spectators.

== Redevelopment ==
In August 2024, the Municipality of Messina handed over a €2.6 million redevelopment project for the stadium, funded through Italy's National Recovery and Resilience Plan. The project included work on the covered stand and south curve, the refurbishment of changing rooms and an internal gym, accessibility improvements, the restoration of the lighting system and the installation of photovoltaic panels.

The municipality stated that the redeveloped venue was intended to operate as a multi-purpose sports facility supporting association football, five-a-side football, seven-a-side football, women's football, rugby and field hockey. As of May 2026, the municipality listed the construction work as completed and the project as undergoing testing.
