= Magdalen papyrus =

Papyrus 64
- New Testament manuscript
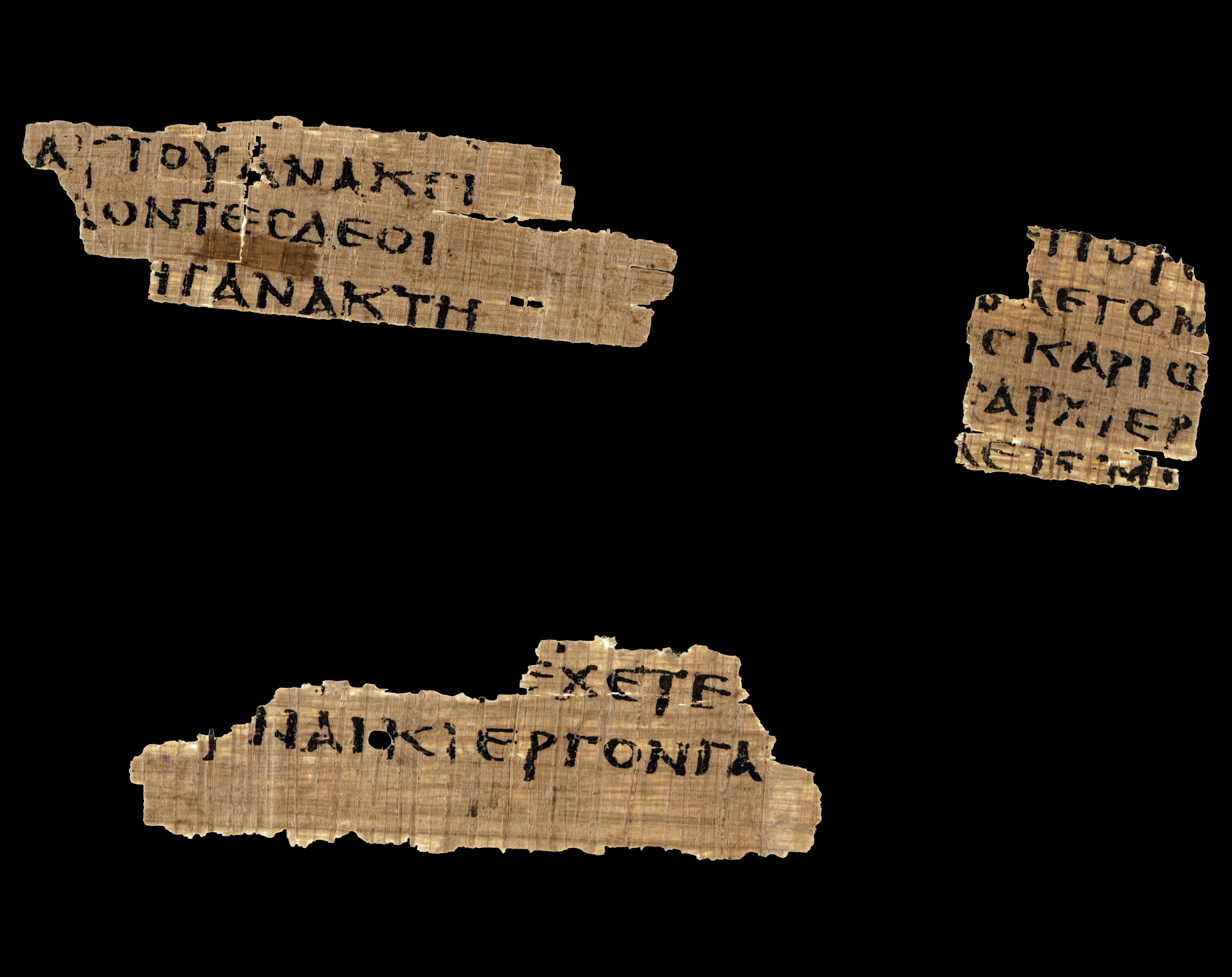
- Oxford fragments of Papyrus 64 recto, Matthew 26:7-8; 26:10, 26:14-15
- Sign: 𝔓^{64}
- Text: Matthew 26:23,31
- Date: Late 2nd to early 3rd century AD
- Script: Greek
- Found: Coptos, Egypt
- Now at: Barcelona, Fundación Sant Lluc Evangelista, Inv. Nr. 1; Oxford, Magdalen College, Gr. 18
- Type: Alexandrian text-type
- Category: I

The "Magdalen" papyrus (/ˈmɔːdlɪn/, MAWD-lin) was purchased in Luxor, Egypt in 1901 by Reverend Charles Bousfield Huleatt (1863–1908), who identified the Greek fragments as portions of the Gospel of Matthew (Chapter 26:23 and 31) and presented them to Magdalen College, Oxford, where they are catalogued as P. Magdalen Greek 17 (Gregory-Aland 𝔓^{64}) from which they acquired their name. When the fragments were published by Colin Henderson Roberts in 1953, illustrated with a photograph, the hand was characterized as "an early predecessor of the so-called 'Biblical Uncial'" which began to emerge towards the end of the 2nd century. The uncial style is epitomised by the later biblical Codex Vaticanus and Codex Sinaiticus.

Comparative paleographical analysis has remained the methodological key for dating the manuscript, with a history of proposals ranging from the 1st century to the 4th century AD, but with most scholars supporting a dating of 200 AD.

The fragments are written on both sides, indicating they came from a codex rather than a scroll. More fragments, published in 1956 by Ramón Roca Puig, cataloged as P. Barc. Inv. 1 (Gregory-Aland 𝔓^{67}), were determined by Roca-Puig and Roberts to come from the same codex as the Magdalen fragments, a view which has remained the scholarly consensus.

== Dating of the manuscript ==
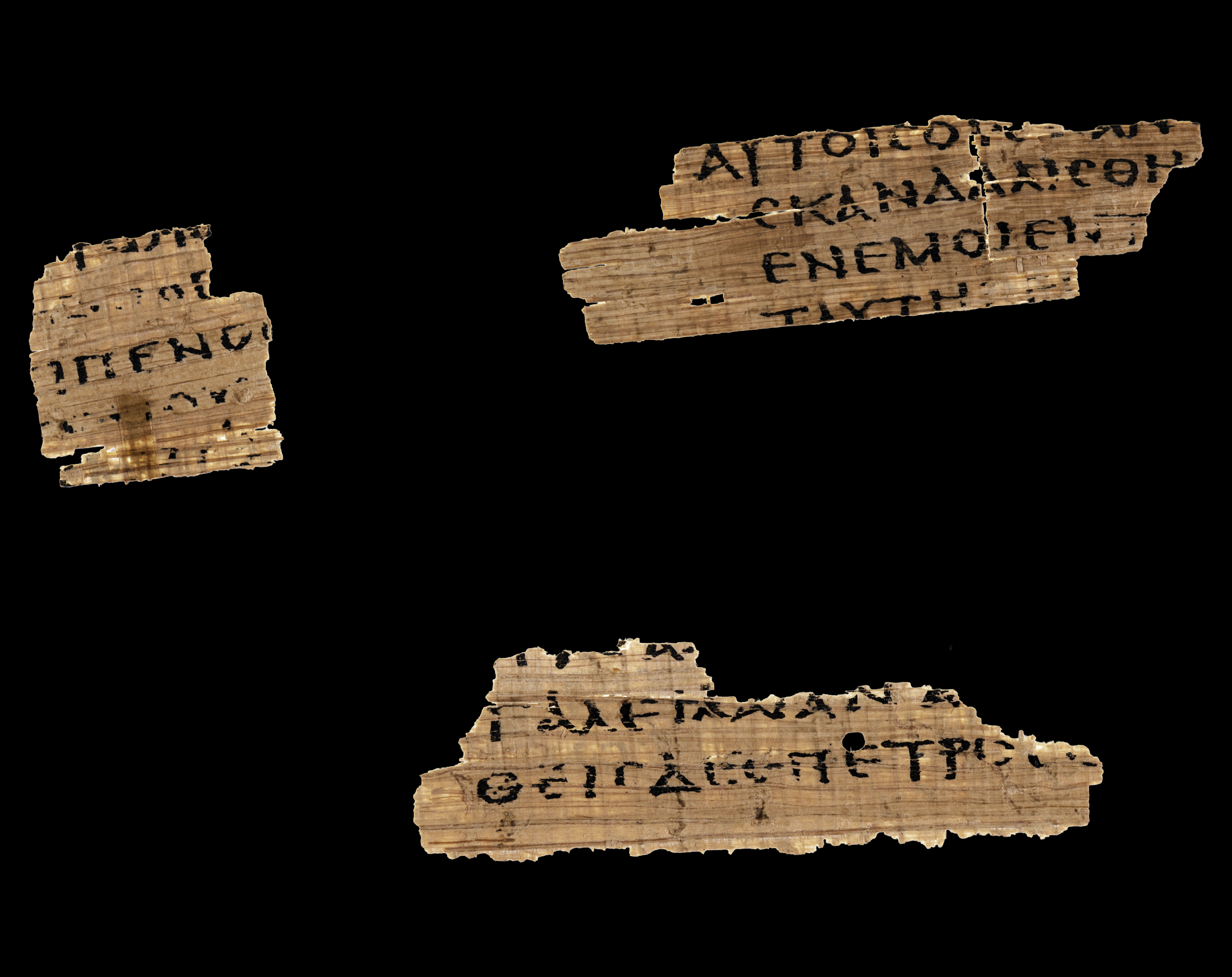
Oxford fragments verso, Matthew 26:22-23; 26:31-33

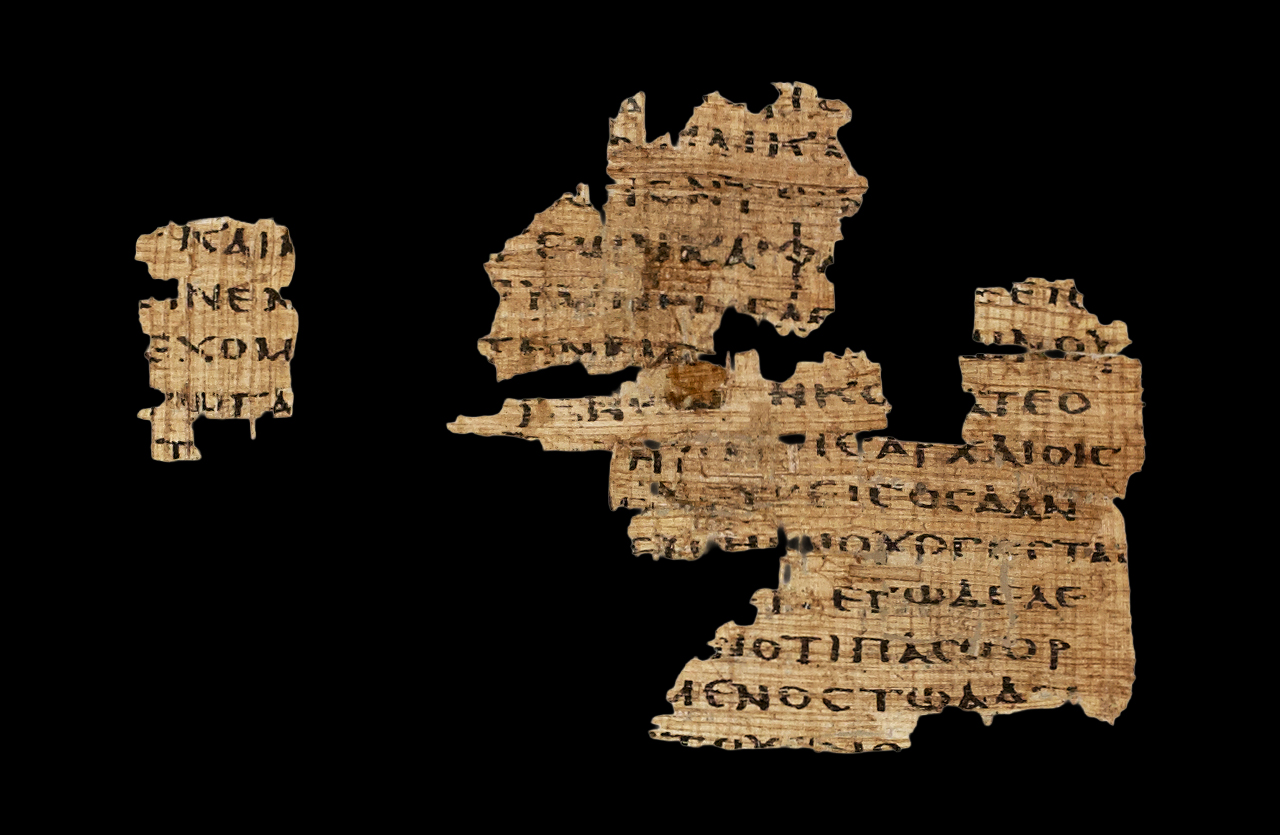
Barcelona fragments recto, Matthew 3:9; 5:20-22

𝔓^{64} was originally given a 3rd-century date by Charles Huleatt, who donated the Manuscript to Magdalen College. Papyrologist A. S. Hunt then studied the manuscript and dated it to the early 4th century. After initially preferring a 3rd or possibly 4th century dating for the papyrus, Colin Roberts published the manuscript and gave it a dating of c. 200, which was confirmed by three other leading papyrologists: Harold Bell, T. C. Skeat and E. G. Turner. In late 1994, Carsten Peter Thiede proposed redating the Magdalen papyrus to the middle of the 1st century (AD 37 to 70). This attracted considerable publicity, as journalists interpreted the claim optimistically. Thiede's official article appeared in Zeitschrift für Papyrologie und Epigraphik in 1995. A version edited for the layman was co-written with Matthew d'Ancona and presented as The Jesus Papyrus, Weidenfeld & Nicolson, London, 1996. (also published as: Eyewitness to Jesus, 1996, New York: Doubleday). Thiede's redating of the papyrus was based on comparative analysis of the script with selected samples from Egypt and Palestine. He claimed to see similarities between the script of the Magdalen papyrus and that of dated documents from the 1st century CE, such as P.Oxy. II 246 (66 AD). Thiede's hypothesis has been viewed with scepticism by nearly all established papyrologists and biblical scholars.

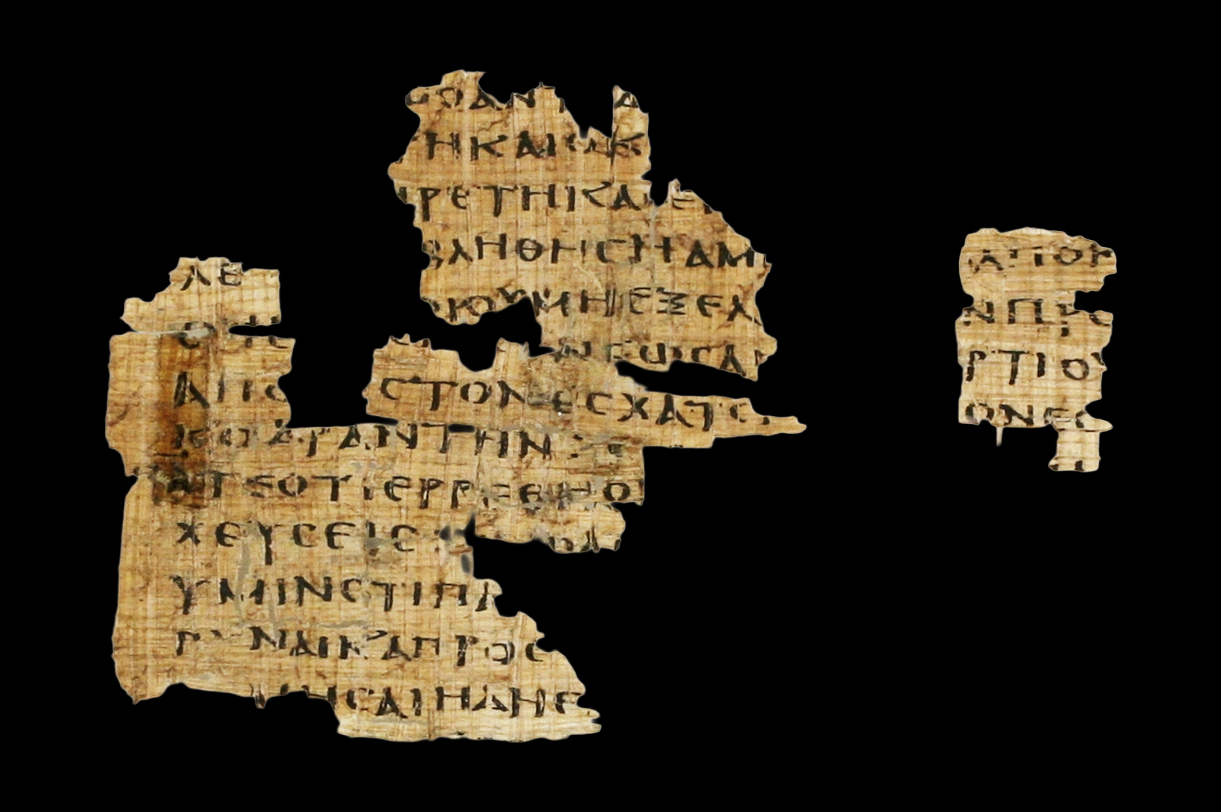
Barcelona fragments verso, Matthew 3:15; 5:25-28

Philip Comfort and David Barret in their book Text of the Earliest NT Greek Manuscripts argue for a more general date of 150–175 for the manuscript, and also for 𝔓^{4} and 𝔓^{67}, which they argue came from the same codex. 𝔓^{4} was used as stuffing for the binding of “a codex of Philo, written in the later 3rd century and found in a jar which had been walled up in a house at Coptos [in 250].” If 𝔓^{4} was part of this codex, then the codex may have been written roughly 100 years prior or earlier. Comfort and Barret also show that this 𝔓^{4/64/67} has affinities with a number of the late 2nd-century papyri.

Comfort and Barret "tend to claim an earlier date for many manuscripts included in their volume than might be allowed by other palaeographers." The Novum Testamentum Graece, a standard reference for the Greek witnesses, lists 𝔓^{4} and 𝔓^{64/67} together, giving them a date of c. 200. Charlesworth has concluded 'that 𝔓^{64+67} and 𝔓^{4}, though written by the same scribe, are not from the same ... codex.' The most recent and thorough palaeographic assessment of the papyrus concluded that "until further evidence is forthcoming perhaps a date from mid-II to mid-IV should be assigned to the codex."

== Early and late dating ==
Carsten Peter Thiede ran paleographical and then forensic analysis on the Magdalen Papyrus to arrive at a date of around 70 AD, and another papyrologist Orsolina Montevecchi had backed this dating. He also published a work with Matthew d’Ancona, which received attention in TIME magazine. These revised dates have prompted much discussion, but have not received wide acceptance amongst the academic community. Don Barker has proposed a range, with 350 AD as the latest possible date.

== See also ==
- List of New Testament papyri

== Images ==
- "Liste Handschriften". Münster: Institute for New Testament Textual Research.
- "The Magdalen Papryus: possibly the earliest known fragments of the New Testament". Oxford: Magdalen College.
