= Fundación Sant Lluc Evangelista =

Private collection of papyri in Barcelona, Spain

The Fundación Sant Lluc Evangelista (Foundation of Saint Luke Evangelist), was founded in 1952, in Barcelona, by Ramón Roca Puig (1906–2001), Spanish papyrolog and priest from Catalonia, who several times travelled to the Near East (Egypt and Palestine), where acquired some important ancient manuscripts.

The collection contains works of the ancient authors, like: Homer (Iliad and Odyssey), Ptolemy, written on papyri in a form of scroll, biblical manuscripts in Greek and Coptic languages from the 3rd and 4th century written in a form of codex, and some early Christian writings.

== Biblical Greek manuscripts in the collection ==
- Papyrus 64
- Papyrus 80
- Uncial 0252
- Uncial 0267
- Uncial 0298
