= Charles Bousfield Huleatt =

Anglican priest and footballer (1863–1908)

Charles Bousfield Huleatt (19 October 1863 – 28 December 1908) also known under the pseudonym of Caulifield, was an Anglican priest born in Folkestone, England. He discovered the Magdalen papyrus and was also an early football player-manager of Messina Football Club.

== Discovery of the Magdalen papyrus ==
Huleatt travelled as a missionary and, while in Luxor, Egypt, discovered three scraps of papyrus which he considered "very important". He gave these to his old college, Magdalen College, Oxford, after which it is now known as the Magdalen papyrus. The papyrus was dated by consensus as c. AD 200, however, some date it as early as AD 68; in either case making it the oldest copy of any part of the Gospel of Matthew.

When illustrated fragments were published by Colin Henderson Roberts in the 1950s, years after the reverend's death, they were described as "an early predecessor of the so-called 'Biblical Uncial'". The papyrus is now the most widely discussed fragment of the New Testament in the world.

The papyrus is currently in print in the form of a book titled; The Jesus Papyrus. Commenting on the book, Richard N. Ostling in Time magazine stated of it: "New Testament scholarship may be revolutionized by three old scraps of papyrus no bigger than postage stamps."

== Messina Football Club ==
Huleatt left Egypt for Messina, Sicily, in 1901 and became involved with Messina Football Club, sometimes using the name "Caulfield" very early on. In 1902 he took over from F. L. Padgett to become only the second ever manager of Messina Football Club; he was also known to captain the team on the field, playing in matches. For his first three seasons with the club, Messina played only in local games; primarily in Sicilian derby matches against Palermo.

Then in 1904, Huleatt along with Messina played in the Whitaker Challenge Cup. Messina beat Palermo 3–2, and in the process won their first ever trophy. They won it again the following year, this time 2–1. His last ever game was on 20 December 1908 against Palermo, Messina won this clash 3–0.

== Death ==
The 1908 Messina earthquake ravaged Messina, Italy, killing around 60,000 people; one of whom was Huleatt who was 45 at the time, along with his entire family under the ruins of their house. Messina was in chaos at that time, and it took the men of the Lancashire cruiser (made up of English sailors) four days to find them from under the rubble.
