= Uncial 0267 =

- New Testament manuscript
- Name: P. Monts. Roca inv. 16
- Text: Luke 8:25-27
- Date: 5th century
- Script: Greek
- Now at: Santa Maria de Montserrat
- Size: 7 cm by 9.5 cm
- Type: mixed
- Category: III

Uncial 0267 (in the Gregory-Aland numbering), is a Greek uncial manuscript of the New Testament. Palaeographically it has been assigned to the 5th century.

== Description ==
The codex contains a small part of the Gospel of Luke 8:25-27, on 1 parchment leaf (7 cm by 9.5 cm). Probably it was written in one column per page, 10 lines per page, in uncial letters.

Currently it is dated by the INTF to the 5th century.

== Text ==
The text of this codex is too brief to determine its textual character. Aland did not place it in any of Categories of New Testament manuscripts. It was examined by Ramón Roca-Puig, who published its text in 1965.

== Location ==
Currently the codex is housed at the Santa Maria de Montserrat (P. Monts. Roca inv. 16) in Catalonia. It was formerly held at the Fundación Sant Lluc Evangelista (Pap. Barcinonensis, inv. n. 16) in Barcelona.

== See also ==
- List of New Testament uncials
- Textual criticism
