= Uncial 0252 =

- New Testament manuscript
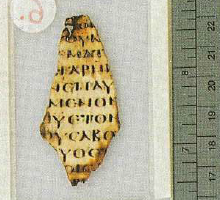
- Name: Pap. Barcinonensis
- Text: Hebrews 6:2-4,6-7
- Date: 5th century
- Script: Greek
- Now at: Abadia de Montserrat
- Size: 20 cm by 17 cm
- Type: mixed
- Category: III

Uncial 0252 (in the Gregory-Aland numbering), is a Greek uncial manuscript of the New Testament. Paleographically it has been assigned to the 5th century.

== Description ==
The codex contains a small part of the Epistle to the Hebrews 6:2-4,6-7, on 1 parchment leaf (20 cm by 17 cm). The leaf survived in a fragmentary condition. Probably it was written in two columns per page, 25 lines per page, in uncial letters.

Currently it is dated by the INTF to the 5th century.

== Text ==
The Greek text of this codex is mixed. Aland placed it in Category III.

It was examined by Ramón Roca-Puig.

== Location ==
Formerly the codex was housed at the Fundación Sant Lluc Evangelista (P. Barc., inv. n. 6) in Barcelona. Currently it is housed at the Abadia de Montserrat (P. Monts.Roca inv. no 6) in Montserrat.

== See also ==
- List of New Testament uncials
- Textual criticism
