= Theodore Cressy Skeat =

British academic and librarian (1907–2003)

- Born: 15 February 1907
- Died: 25 June 2003 (aged 96)
- Relatives: Walter William Skeat (grandfather)

Academic background
- Education: Whitgift School; Christ's College, Cambridge

Academic work
- Discipline: Textual criticism; Biblical studies
- Institutions: British Museum

Theodore Cressy Skeat (15 February 1907 – 25 June 2003) was a British academic and librarian at the British Museum, where he worked as Assistant Keeper (from 1931), Deputy Keeper (from 1948), and Keeper of Manuscripts and Egerton Librarian (from 1961 to 1972). He was the grandson of noted philologist Walter William Skeat.

Skeat was educated at Whitgift School, Croydon and Christ's College, Cambridge, where he graduated in 1929 with a second-class BA in the Classical Tripos. Following a further short spell as a student at the British School at Athens, an academic institute specialising in archaeology and classical studies, he was recruited by the British Museum in 1931.

Skeat's work coincided with two important acquisitions by the British Museum Trustees: the Codex Sinaiticus and the apocryphal Gospel Egerton 2 Papyrus (a.k.a. the Egerton Gospel). He made a name for himself with important contributions to palaeography, papyrology and codicology, particularly in relation to these two acquisitions.

Skeat was elected a Fellow of the British Academy in 1963, but resigned (along with his friend Colin Roberts) in 1979, in protest against its decision not to expel Anthony Blunt after the latter was exposed as a former Soviet spy.

== Obituaries ==
- J. Keith Elliott, Theodore Cressy Skeat, TC: A Journal of Biblical Textual Criticism, 2003.
- J. Keith Elliott, Obituary: T. C. Skeat, The Independent, July 8, 2003.
- Dorothy J. Thompson, In memoriam Theodore Cressy SKEAT, 2004.

== Select bibliography ==
- H. I. Bell, and T. C. Skeat (eds.), Fragments of an Unknown Gospel and other early Christian papyri, London: Trustees of the British Museum, 1935.
- H. J. M. Milne, and T. C. Skeat, Scribes and Correctors of the Codex Sinaiticus, London: Trustees of the British Museum, 1938.
- T. C. Skeat, The Reigns of the Ptolemies, in: Mizraim. Journal of Papyrology, Egyptology, History of Ancient Laws, and their Relations to the Civilizations of Bible Lands, ed. N. J. Reich, vol. 6, New York: G. E. Stechert & Co., 1937; reprinted as vol. 39 (39. Heft) of the series 'Münchener Beiträge zur Papyrusforschung und antiken Rechtsgeschichte', ed. M. San Nicolò, H. Bengtson, Munich: C. H. Beck'sche Verlagsbuchhandlung, 1954.
- C. H. Roberts, and T. C. Skeat, The Birth of the Codex, Oxford University Press, New York – Cambridge 1983.
- T. C. Skeat, The collected Biblical writings of T. C. Skeat, ed. J. K. Elliott, Supplements to Novum Testamentum 113, Leiden and Boston: Brill, 2004.
