= Uncial 0298 =

- New Testament manuscript
- Name: Papyrus Barcinonensis 16
- Text: Matthew 26 †
- Date: 8th/9th century
- Script: Greek-Coptic
- Now at: Abadia de Montserrat
- Size: 17 cm by 8.8 cm

Uncial 0298 (in the Gregory-Aland numbering), is a Greek-Coptic uncial manuscript of the New Testament. Palaeographically it has been assigned to the 8th or 9th century.

== Description ==
The codex contains a small parts of the Gospel of Matthew 26:24-29 in Greek and Matthew 26:17-21 in Coptic (Sahidic dialect), on 1 parchment leaf (17 cm by 8.8 cm). The text is written in one column per page, 19 lines per page, in uncial letters.

Currently it is dated by the INTF to the 8th or 9th century.

It is a palimpsest, the lower text is in Latin, it was written in the 5th century.

The text of the manuscript was published by Ramón Roca-Puig in 1985.

== Location ==
Formerly the codex was housed at the Fundación Sant Lluc Evangelista (P. Barc., inv. n. 4) in Barcelona. Currently it is housed at the Abadia de Montserrat (P. Monts. Roca inv. no. 4).

== See also ==
- List of New Testament uncials
- Coptic versions of the Bible
- Biblical manuscripts
- Textual criticism
