= Egerton Gospel =

Biblical manuscript

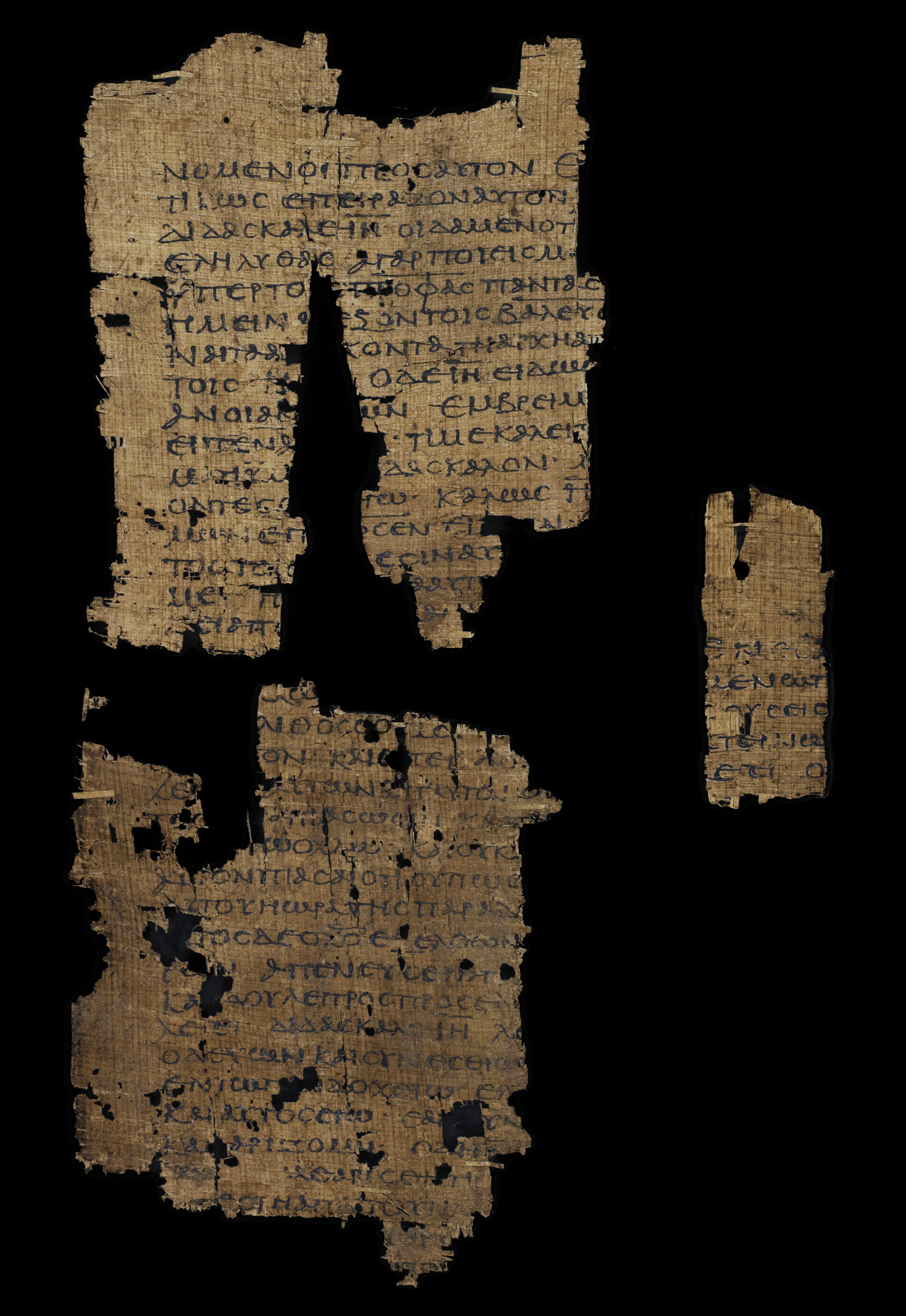
Egerton Papyrus 2, British Library. (Recto)

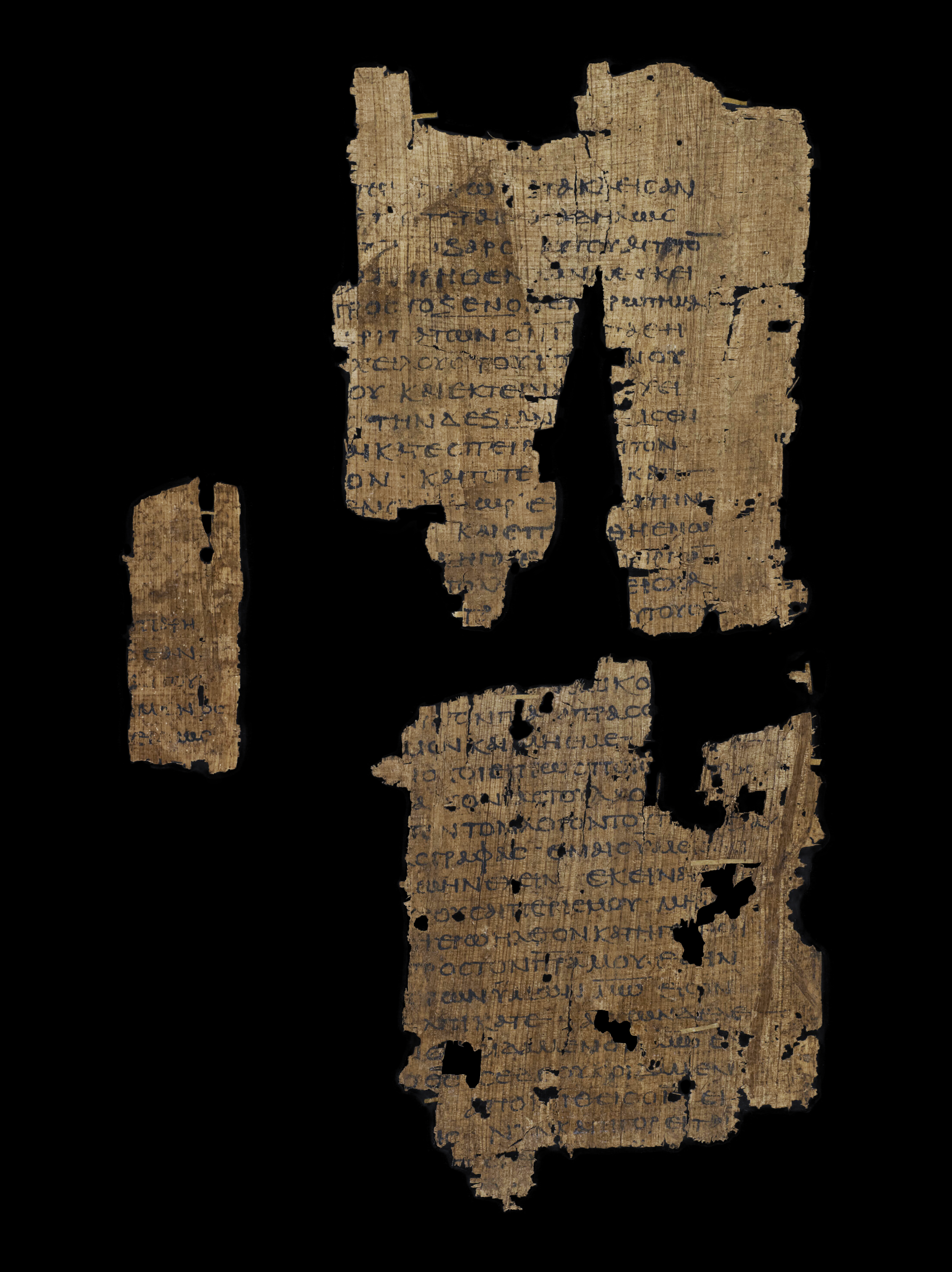
Egerton Papyrus 2, British Library. (Verso)

The Egerton Gospel (British Library Egerton Papyrus 2) refers to a collection of three papyrus fragments of a codex of a previously unknown gospel, found in Egypt and sold to the British Museum in 1934; the physical fragments are now dated to the very end of the 2nd century CE. Together they comprise one of the oldest surviving witnesses to any gospel, or any codex. The British Museum lost no time in publishing the text: acquired in the summer of 1934, it was in print in 1935. It is also called the Unknown Gospel, as no ancient source makes reference to it, in addition to being entirely unknown before its publication. Many scholars argue that Egerton is dependent on the canonical gospels or at least the gospel of John, though others contend that it is independent or is the antecedent from which John's gospel is partly drawn.

== Provenance ==
Three fragments of the manuscript form part of the Egerton Collection in the British Library. A fourth fragment of the same manuscript was identified in the papyrus collection of the University of Cologne, and published in 1987.

The provenance of the four fragments is a matter of some dispute. Throughout the 20th century the provenance of the Egerton fragments was kept anonymous, with the initial editors suggesting without proof that they came from the Oxyrhynchus Papyri. In 2019 it was established that they were purchased in 1934 from Maurice Nahman, an antiquities dealer in Cairo. Nahman purchased the manuscript sometime between the 1920s and 1934, without recording its origin. Nahman bragged that he had many origins for his manuscripts. The Oxyrhynchus identification is thus in question. The Cologne fragment was deposited without any provenance whatsoever. Circumstantial evidence suggests that this was purchased from Nahman's estate at the time of his death in 1954.

Colin Henderson Roberts reported seeing an account of the Passion of Jesus in Nahman's collection. Other Biblical scholars urgently pursued this missing fragment, but Nahman's collection was sold off indiscriminately to many different European universities and private collectors. The names of buyers were not recorded and the final whereabouts of this fragment, if it exists, are unknown.

== Contents ==
The surviving fragments include four stories:

1. A controversy similar to John 5:39–47 and John 10:31–39;
2. Curing a leper similar to Matthew 8:1–4, Mark 1:40–45, Luke 5:12–16, and Luke 17:11–14;
3. A controversy about paying tribute to Caesar analogous to Matthew 22:15–22, Mark 12:13–17, Luke 20:20–26;
4. An incomplete account of a miracle on the Jordan River bank, perhaps carried out to illustrate the parable about seeds growing miraculously.

The latter story has no equivalent in the canonical Gospels:

Jesus walked and stood on the bank of the Jordan river; he reached out his right hand, and filled it [...] And he sowed it on the [...] And then [...] water [...] and [...] before their eyes; and it brought forth fruit [...] many [...] for joy [...]

== Dating the manuscript ==
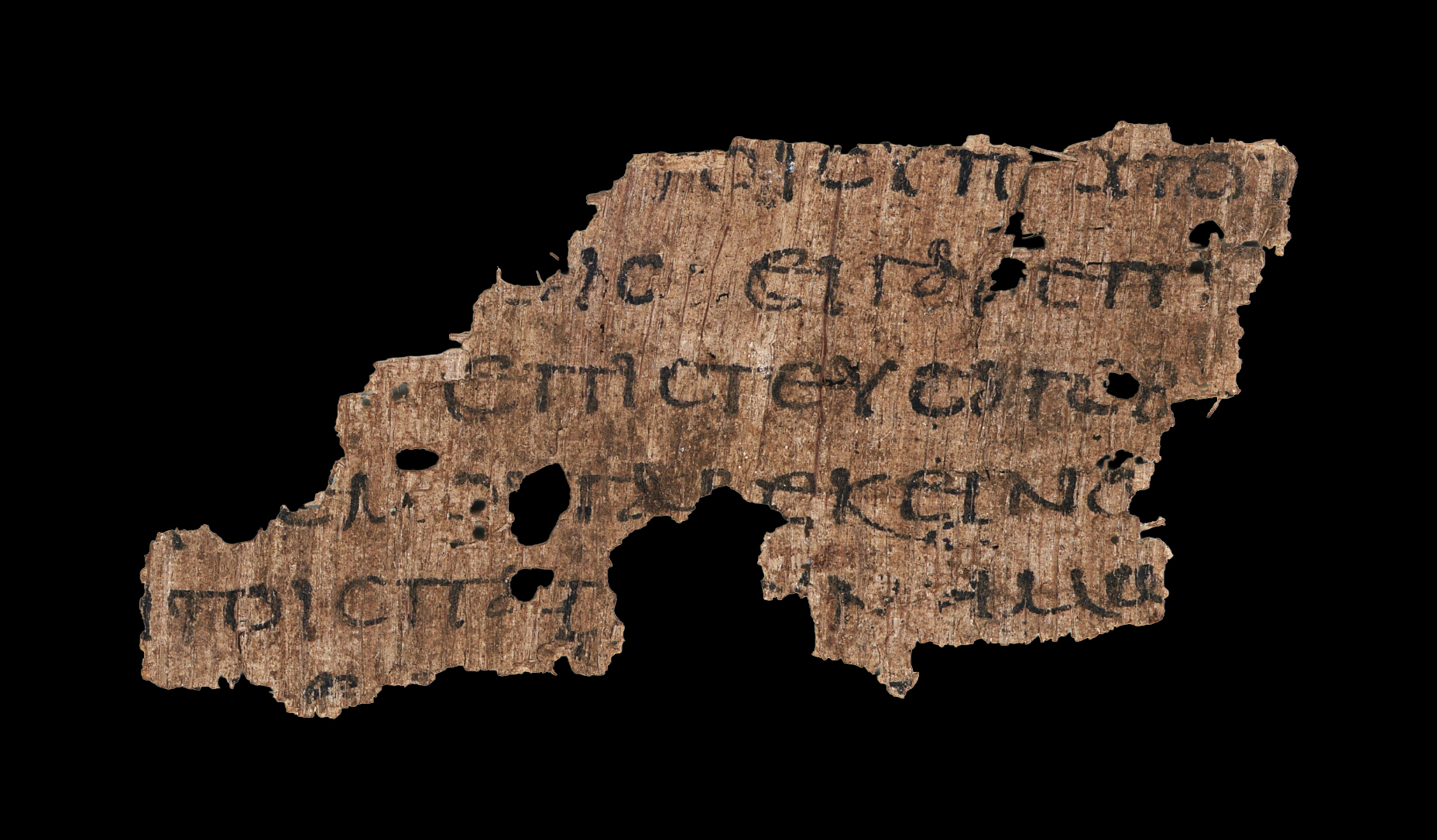
Papyrus Köln 255 (verso)

The date of the manuscript is established through palaeography (the comparison of writing styles) alone. When the Egerton fragments were first published, its date was estimated at around 150 CE; implying that, of early Christian papyri it would be rivalled in age only by 𝔓^{52}, the John Rylands Library fragment of the Gospel of John. Later, when an additional papyrus fragment of the Egerton Gospel text was identified in the University of Cologne collection (Papyrus Köln 255) and published in 1987, it was found to fit on the bottom of one of the British Library papyrus pages. In this additional fragment a single use of a hooked apostrophe in between two consonants was observed, a practice that became standard in Greek punctuation at the beginning of the 3rd century; this sufficed to revise the date of the Egerton manuscript. This study placed the manuscript to around the time of Bodmer Papyri 𝔓^{66}, c. 200; noting that Eric Turner had palaeographically dated 𝔓^{66} as around 200 CE, citing use of the hooked apostrophe in that papyrus in support of this date.

The revised dating for the Egerton Papyrus continues to carry wide support. However, Stanley Porter has reviewed the dating of the Egerton Papyrus alongside that of 𝔓^{52}; noting that the scholarly consensus dating the former to the turn of the third century and the latter to the first half of the second century was contra-indicated by close palaeographic similarities of the two manuscripts. The 1987 redating of the Egerton Papyrus had rested on a comment made by Eric Turner in 1971:

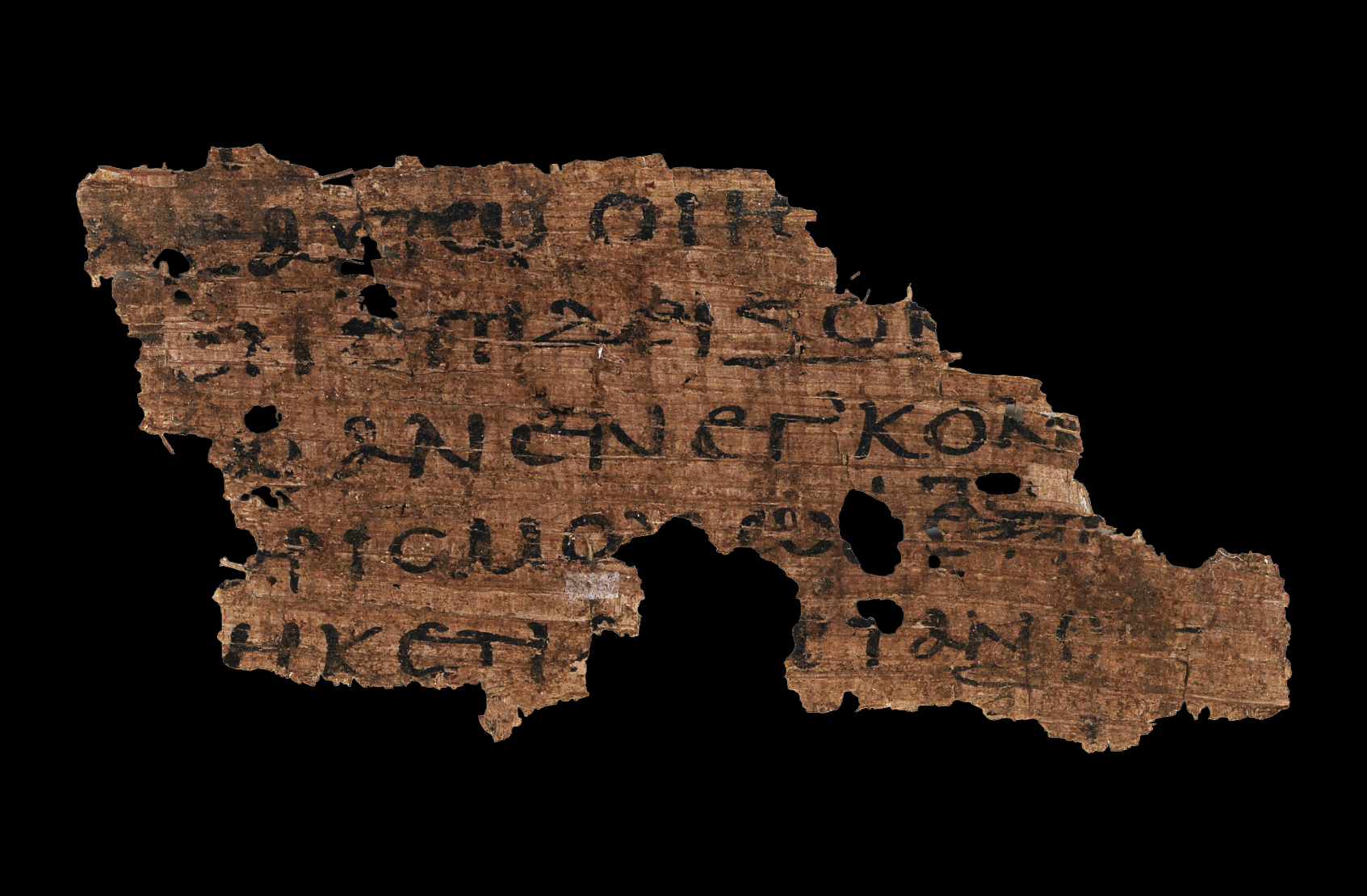
Papyrus Köln 255 (recto), University of Cologne features "ΑΝΕΝΕΓ᾽ΚΟΝ" spelled with an apostrophe

[I]n the first decade of III AD, this practice (of using an apostrophe between two consonants, such as double mutes or double liquids) suddenly becomes extremely common, and then persists.

Porter notes that Turner had then nevertheless advanced several earlier dated examples of the practice from the later second century, and one (BGU III 715.5) is dated to 101 CE. Porter proposes that, notwithstanding the discovery of the hooked apostrophe in P. Köln 255, the original editors' proposal of a mid second century date for the Egerton Papyrus accords better with the palaeographic evidence of dated comparator documentary and literary hands for both 𝔓^{52} and this papyrus "the middle of the second century, perhaps tending towards the early part of it".

== Date of composition ==
Most scholars place P. Egerton 2 to the second or third centuries, after the gospel of John was written. Its relationship with the canonical gospels is a matter of debate; many scholars argue that it is dependent on the canonical gospels or at least the gospel of John, though others have argued it is independent or served as a source for John. Harold Attridge notes that Egerton’s claim that Jesus’s opponents do not know where he is from strongly suggests that the papyrus is dependent on the gospel of John.

According to Jon B. Daniels in The Complete Gospels, given the similarities and differences with the canonical gospels, the author of Egerton most likely wrote independently of the other gospel writers from a shared source of traditional sayings and stories. Scholar François Bovon observes that the Egerton fragments "sound very Johannine" but also includes a number of terms characteristic of the Gospel of Luke, (Note: Specifically nomikos, strapheis, sunodeuw, sunesthiw, pandocheion.) and is especially similar to Luke 5:12–14 and Luke 17:14 a conclusion also shared by scholar Tobias Nicklas. Ronald Cameron argues that Egerton is independent of the canonical gospels and was likely written during the second half of the first century as its traditions are less developed than John’s.

Helmut Koester and John Dominic Crossan have argued that despite its apparent historical importance, the text is not well known. It is a mere fragment, and does not bear a clear relationship to any of the four canonical gospels. The Egerton Gospel has been largely ignored outside a small circle of scholars. The work cannot be dismissed as "apocrypha" or "heretical" without compromising the orthodoxy of the Gospel of John. Nor can it be classed as "gnostic" and dismissed as marginal. It seems to be almost independent of the synoptic gospels and to represent a tradition similar to the canonical John, but independent of it. Additionally, it tells of an otherwise unknown miracle in the Johannine manner.

Evangelical scholar Craig Evans supports a date for the Egerton Gospel later than the canonical gospels in a variety of ways. He finds many parallels between the Egerton Gospel and the canonical gospels that include editorial language particular to Matthew and Luke. While Koester argues that these show a tradition before the other gospels, Evans sees these as drawing from the other gospels in the same way that Tatian and Justin Martyr did in composing their works. He also finds words such as the plural "priests" that show lack of knowledge of Jewish customs.

== See also ==
- List of Gospels
- New Testament apocrypha
