= History of ACR Messina =

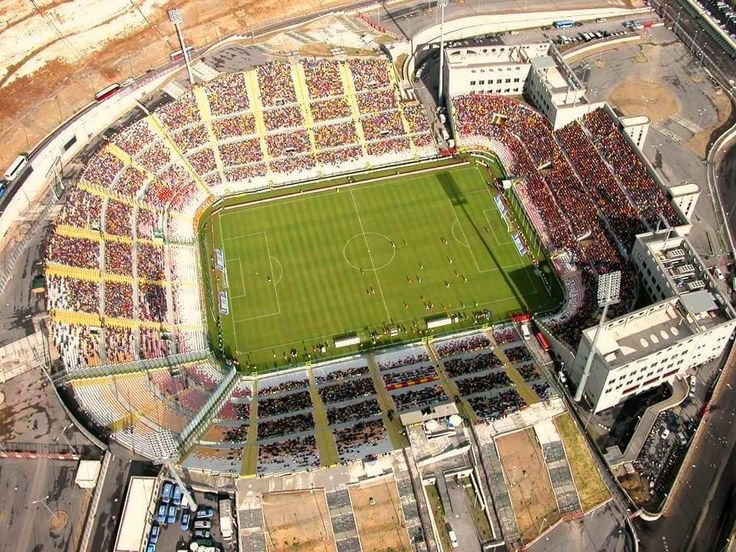
Messina supporters at Stadio San Filippo, 2007

Associazioni Calcio Riunite Messina 1947 is the top association football club in Messina and among the major ones in Sicily. It currently plays in Serie D. Its colors are yellow and red.

The club's history begun in 1900, when the club was founded under the denomination of Messina Football Club, and spanned until the most recent successes, with a total of four Serie A campaign, three of them being in the 2000s.

The club was refounded a number of times, more recently in 2009 as A.C. Rinascita Messina and has played in all the Italian professional leagues from Serie A, the first time as A.C. Riunite Messina to Serie C2 in different times, but also in amateur leagues Serie D and Eccellenza following the most recent club disbandment.

== From 1900 to today ==
=== Messina F.C. ===
The history of Messina Football Club began when Alfredo Marangolo returned to Sicily in August 1900 from studying in London, England. In Great Britain the game of football was fast gathering popularity with The Football League in its early stages.

Messina Football Club was officially founded on 1 December 1900 by Marangolo with the help of Anglican reverend "Caulifield". The first club manager and captain was a man named F. L. Padgett, who stayed only for a year and Messina played their home games at San Ranieri.

The staff foundations of the Messina football organization, was composed of 9 Englishmen, 4 Italians, 2 Swiss-Danish, 1 American and 1 German, including;

- Walter F. Becker - President
- Charles M. Caughy - Vice President
- Walter Oates - Secretary
- Horace Gooding - Councilman
- F.L. Padgett - Councilman
- M. Way - Councilman
- Adolph Marangolo - Councilman
- Giulio Arena Ainis - Councilman
- J. Giorgianni - Councilman
- G. Lovatelli - Councilman
- William Robert Sanderson - Honorary Associate
- Guglielmo Sarauw - Honorary Associate
- Carl Sarauw - Honorary Associate
- George Oates - Honorary Associate
- Herbert Oates - Honorary Associate
- Edward James Eaton - Honorary Associate
- Eduard Jacob - Honorary Associate

==== Derby of Sicily: Huleatt era ====
At the college where Marangolo visited he had also made the acquaintance of Ignazio Majo Pagano who formed Anglo Palermitan (Palermo) on his return, only a month before Messina. Indeed, the first Sicilian derby was held between Messina and Palermo on 18 April 1901, 1000 fans turned out to Via Notarbartolo in support their respective club for the match. The game ended 3–2 to the Palermitan side. After the match, the two club celebrated the arrival of football in Sicily in a cordial fashion with a banquet thrown at the Hotel Milano. The press at the time noted the good sportsmanship and fair play between the clubs.

Charles Bousfield Huleatt who had helped put the club together originally with Marangolo under the name "Caulifield" took over as Messina player-manager from their second year onwards. In 1904, Messina restored their pride from the earlier clash with Palermo, by coming out victorious 3–2. The two teams again celebrated together after toasting drunkenly "to the solidarity of the circle, to their future, to Palermo, to Messina, to the King of Italy, the King of England".

A strong bond, and healthy rivalry had built up between the two Sicilian clubs and a competition named the Whitaker Challenge Cup was arranged to be played between them. The first was held in 1905; Messina won another game (the result was 3–2) and in doing so captured their first trophy. Messina proved the result was no fluke the following year at San Ranieri; capturing the trophy in a 2–1 victory.

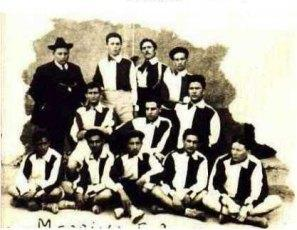
Messina team photograph from 1910.

=== G.S. Garibaldi ===
The earthquake of 1908, which killed 60,000 people in Messina; affected the club in a large manner; Deaths included Charles Bousfield Huleatt, players Frank John Carter, Walter Oates and financial backer George H. Peirce.

Football resumed in Messina during the following year; thanks largely to Arthur Barret Lascelles who used money from his own pocket to ensure football activity in the city would continue. By 1910 the funds of Barret had dried up and the club was folded, Società Ginnastica Garibaldi Messina (Gymnastic Society Garibaldi Messina) briefly took its place until it too was dissolved due to the First World War.

=== U.S. Messinese ===
After World War I, a club under the name U.S. Messinese was founded and entered to play in the Coppa Federale Siciliana the following year; an all Sicilian championship disputed in Messina, Catania and Palermo. Messina finished as runners-up.

The club participated in the Italian Football Championship of 1921-22 organised by the C.C.I. finishing 3rd in the Sicilian group section; this was the first Championship in which clubs from the Island were entered. The following season the FIGC and CCI were unified.

This coincided with unifications in Messina. Another side Umberto Messina was incorporated into U.S. Messinese, and thus the club changed its name to U.S. Messinese Umberto in October 1922. The following month this new side was fused again, this time with Messina Sporting Club; creating the Messina Football Club. The club's football ground was that of the Citadel "Enzo Geraci". Only two years later in December 1924 FC Messina was melted, and the players became part of the reformed U.S. Messinese.

Finally, Messinese qualified for the semi-finals of the International league, after beating Palermo 3–0 in the Sicilian championship of 1924-25. Here Messinese played against Alba Roma, Cavese and Liberty Bari, but failed to win a single match, scoring only two goals in six games.

The following season, Messina was truly humbled by Palermo, who beat them 7–1 over two legs, for the Sicilian championship. Messina however, was still admitted to the semi-finals, but with similar results to the previous year. After the re-organisation of 1926, Messina was entered into the Seconda Divisione. Messina came close to promotion, but lost out to rivals Palermo; Messina would be promoted to Serie B for the 1932-33 campaign under the presidency of Francesco Lombardo and Koenig's coaching.

Messina remained in the league for six seasons, finishing as high as 4th during the 1935–36 season. The spell in Serie B was also notable for the local rivalry between them and Calcio Catania. The stats, for this period for Messina versus Catania, were two wins, four losses, eight goals scored, eight conceded. Notably, all three major Sicilian clubs played in Serie B during 1936–37.

=== A.C. Messina: numerous mergings ===
Down in Serie C, AC Messina were withdrawn and folded during 1940–41. The following season in 1941-42 a club named US Peloro 1906 changed its name and became US Mario Passamonte (named after a fallen hero of the war in Africa). The idea was to enter the club into Serie C in place of Messina, however this was unsuccessful, until the following season.

It would not be long before all activity was halted in Italian football for World War II. After several mergers in 1945; including one between US Passamonte and AP Messina, the club AS Messina subsequently emerged as a post-war representative of Messina. This was not a clean cut merger however, some players and officials formed the rival club Giostra Messina; both Giostra and AS Messina reached the finals of the Southern League but eventually finished 4th and 5th respectively. At the end of the season.

=== A.C. Riunite Messina ===
In 1947, the two teams AS Messina and Giostra Messina were united as one merged club Associazione Calcio Riunite Messina, abbreviated as AC Riunite Messina.

==== Success in the League: 1950s and early 1960s ====
The 1950s for Messina began in glorious fashion, they were crowned champions of Serie C under the management of Yugoslavian manager Mihaly Balacics. Messina did not falter in Serie B, during their first season in the league they avoided relegation. Giuseppe Melazzo and the Comitato Reggenza owned the club during this new period of relative success. During the following season, Messina finished 3rd. This period was also notable in Sicilian football for the rivalry between Messina and Catania, similar to the one the club's shared in the 1930s. The two clubs performed respectfully in terms of final positions in Serie B during the early 50s, with Catania gaining promotion to Serie A in 1954. Statistically, Messina were the more dominant club in the Sicilian derby during this period, winning 4 games and losing 2; the other 2 games finished as draws.

Throughout the rest of the 1950s, Messina remained in the division as a whole finishing in a respectful position. Goffredo Muglia took over as president in 1958 to begin a brand new era for the club. For the first time in their history, Messina were crowned champions of Serie B during the 1962–63 season. The race for the championship was a very close one which went down to the last day of the season, with Messina finishing above Bari and Lazio.

For their first ever season in Serie A, the football squad for Messina included; Morelli, Brambilla, Stucchi, Pagani, Dotti, Peruvian Benitez, Ghelfi, Fascetti, Morbello, Canuti and Clerici. Messina's first game in Serie A took place on 15 September 1963, it ended in a 3–1 defeat against Sampdoria at Stadio Luigi Ferraris. As a whole the first part of the season was not a success, they won only 2 games, but they managed to turn it around in the second half of the season, with 7 wins; beating Juventus (1-0), Fiorentina (1-0) and Sampdoria (4-3). The surge of wins in the latter part of the season helped them stay up, finishing 14th.

The next season for the club in Serie A would not be so fortunate, they were relegated in 17th place. Some notable high points of the season included a 1–0 victory over Roma at the Stadio Olimpico. A team from Rome would also be the opposition for Messina's other most impressive result of the season, they stunned Lazio by beating them 4–0 on the last day of the season.

==== Decline ====
The Sicilian side were not able to bounce straight back up into Serie A, and in fact during their third season back down in Serie B were relegated. It was a cruel way to be relegated for the club, as three teams who survived (Perugia, Lecco and Genoa) finished with the same number of points as Messina; their position in the league was decided via a series of play-off games.

After several seasons finishing in and around the top 10 positions of Serie C, Messina were relegated down to Serie D in the 1972–73 season. The club managed to bounce straight back however, winning the Serie D championship and achieving promotion back into C. After a few decent seasons in the upper parts of the table, relegation struck Messina again. In the 1979 season Serie C2 was formed and Messina were placed into it.

==== 1980s revival with Schillaci ====
By 1983 Messina were champions of Serie C2 and had a future star amongst their ranks in Salvatore Schillaci. The club, now back on the right tracks came close to promotion to Serie B in 1985 with a 3rd-place finish just behind Palermo. The following season Messina won Serie C1 and earned themselves promotion back to Serie B.

Time in Serie B during the 1980s was a pleasant one for the Sicilian side, they notched up 7th and 8th-place finishes. In 1989 the club's most capped player of all time Salvatore Schillaci, was sold by Zdeněk Zeman to Turin giants Juventus, he also went onto great success on the national stage just a year later at the 1990 FIFA World Cup winning the Golden Boot with Italy.

==== Financial problems ====
Just three seasons after Schillaci's departure, Messina lost their position in Serie B and were relegated down to C1 and then spiralled into further trouble. The club finished 12th in Serie C1, but due to financial difficulties the FIGC cancelled all professional football activity for Messina.

In 1993 it was included to Sicilian Promozione and in 1994 it was admitted in Sicilian Eccellenza. In this league the club has played until 1998 when following the relegation in Sicilian Promozione was dissolved.

=== A.S. Messina ===
The decision was thought to be unjust by the club and fans, with Messina been thrown into a footballing abyss never known before. In the summer 1993 A.S. Messina was founded with the president Pietro La Malfa, beginning in the amateurs national championship (C.N.D.) with the objective to bring back the giallorossi to professional football.

They played in the Campionato Nazionale Dilettanti for four seasons, finishing high up for the first three of them, but in the season 1996-97 it was ranked last and relegated to the Sicilian Eccellenza league.

In the season 1998-99 it was relegated to Sicilian Promozione and was dissolved.

=== From U.S. Peloro to F.C. Messina Peloro ===
In the summer 1994 after the merger of Villafranca and Tremestieri U.S. Peloro was founded. It plays two season in Sicilian Eccellenza and in 1996 it was promoted to Campionato Nazionale Dilettanti. Then in the 1996 season the club has played in the same league of the town's other team A.S. Messina, where it was ranked 6th.

In July 1997 the club has changed its name to Football Club Messina Peloro. Emanuele Aliotta was the new chairman of Messina Peloro and in a few short seasons, the club ramped up the Italian league system. Stating with Campionato Nazionale Dilettanti in the 1997–98 season, Messina were promoted into Serie C2 as champions. In their first season back in this league they finished 2nd to Benevento Calcio, although this was a setback, the revival was strong and the following season they were crowned champions.

The 2000–01 season in Serie C1 was won by local rivals Palermo; Messina came in second three points shy of the leaders. Messina were entered into the play-offs; they beat Calcio Catania to secure promotion back into Serie B. In less than a decade, under the presidency of Aliotta, Messina had climbed back up from the abyss and were back in the upper part of the Italian league system.

After two seasons in B, a new chairman took over at Messina: Pietro Franza. The 2003–04 season saw the Sicilian side gain promotion back into Serie A under coach Bortolo Mutti. Six sides from Serie B were promoted that season. The club had not since 1965 appeared in the top Italian league, a total of forty years.

==== Serie A: Messina at height ====
After being tipped as underdogs in Serie A for the 2004–05 season, Messina surprised doubters by producing several good results including defeating both of the Milanese clubs. They beat AC Milan first at the San Siro 2-1 then later in the season at home, they beat Internazionale for the first time in their history; the winning goal was struck by Rafael in the third minute of extra time.

Messina managed to stay clear of relegation throughout the whole season, and eventually finished in 7th place in the table, just a single place away from securing a UEFA Cup place. Also during this period, for the first time in the club's history Messina players were called up in the Italy national football team, first was Alessandro Parisi in 2004, then Carmine Coppola in 2005 who was called up twice by the azzurri.

Despite this impressive form however, Messina still were in danger of being relegated from Serie A at the end of the season due to a possibility of not having enough finances available to compete in the league. Eventually, though, they successfully managed to stay in the Serie A League. In the 2005–06 season Messina was however unable to repeat its previous impressive season, leading this to the sacking of Mutti, who was replaced by Giampiero Ventura; despite all, they looked to be mathematically relegated from the top division after Day 36 losing the derby against Reggina 3–0. However, due to the Serie A scandal of 2006, Messina avoided relegation to Serie B despite finishing 18th.

==== The bankrupt ====
Messina started the 2006–07 season with Bruno Giordano as head coach; however, he was replaced on January 30, 2007, by Alberto Cavasin because of poor results. On April 2, following a 2–0 away defeat to Cagliari Calcio, another team involved in the battle to avoid relegation, Cavasin was sacked too, and Giordano was recalled to fill the coaching position. Giordano made even worse in his second time at Messina, with four defeats in four matches; with Messina second-last placed in the table five matchdays prior to the end of the season, Giordano was sacked again on April 23 and replaced by Bruno Bolchi.

A notable achievement for Messina so far this season, was reaching the last 16 of the Coppa Italia for only the second time in their history. Messina knocked out S.S. Lazio on the way in a thrilling show down, which went to extra time; Messina won the game 4–3 with goals from Iliev, Cordova and two from Di Napoli. They went out in the next round to eventual finalists Internazionale.

The 2007–08 Serie B campaign for Messina started with a new coach, former Venezia boss Nello Di Costanzo. The club however started with little hopes for a prompt return to the top flight, always leaning in middle of the league table throughout the season. In July 2008 Messina chairman Pietro Franza announced he did not find any investor ready to take over the club, and that he was consequently giving up the club's Serie B membership, declaring also he would look forward to enter the club into an amateur league. On 1 August, it was confirmed that Messina was admitted to Serie D. In November 2008, the Court of Messina declared the club to be bankrupt and appointed a trustee to start a search for potential investors.

=== A.C. Rinascita Messina ===
In March 2009, Rome-based entrepreneur Alfredo Di Lullo acquired Football Club Messina Peloro in a blind auction held by the Court of Messina and in April 2009 it becomes A.C. Rinascita Messina.

On January 4, 2011, the club is transferred to the group Martorano which August 14, 2011 sold it to Raffaele "Lello" Manfredi.

=== A.C. Riunite Messina 1947 ===
Starting in the summer of 2014, the new name of the club was Associazioni Calcio Riunite Messina 1947. In the 2014–15 season, the club was relegated to Serie D, but it was readmitted to Lega Pro for involvement in sporting fraud. Since the summer of 2015, the new owner and president is Natale Stracuzzi. The club failed to submit its surety by the 5 July 2017 deadline and was expelled by Lega Pro. A successor club, A.C.R. Messina was admitted to the 2017–18 Serie D.
