= Papyrus 80 =

Papyrus 𝔓^{80}
- New Testament manuscript
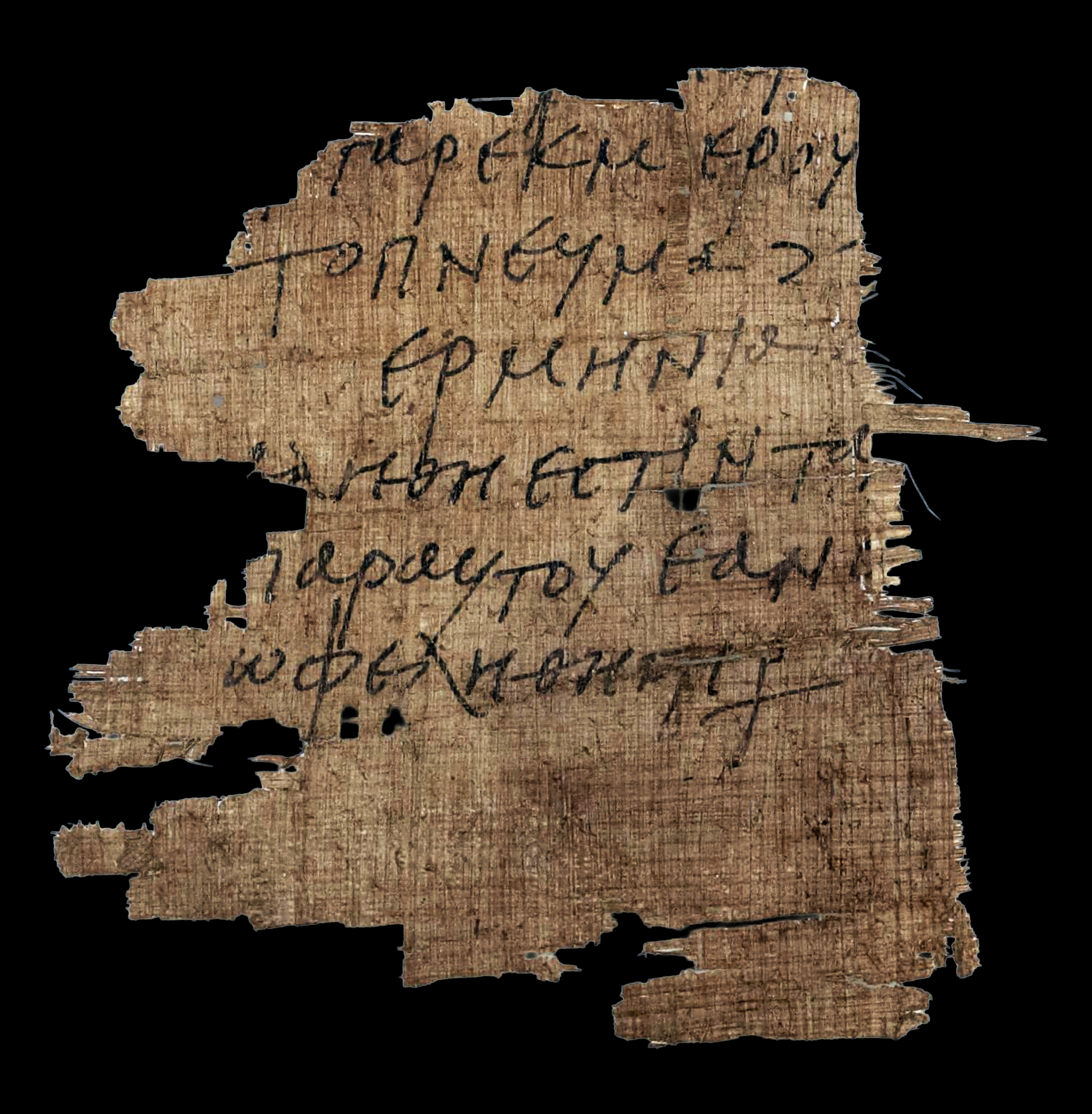
- Recto, John 3:34
- Text: Gospel of John 3:34
- Date: 3rd century
- Script: Greek
- Found: Egypt
- Now at: Foundation of St. Luke the Evangelist
- Cite: R. Roca-Puig, Papiro del evangelio de San Juan con ‘Hermeneia’, (Milan: 1966), pp. 225-236.
- Size: 10.4 cm x 10.6 cm
- Type: Alexandrian text-type
- Category: I

Papyrus 80 (in the Gregory-Aland numbering), designed by 𝔓^{80}, is an early copy of the New Testament in Greek. It is a papyrus manuscript of the Gospel of John. The surviving text of John is verse 3:34. The manuscript paleographically had been assigned to the 3rd century.

Text

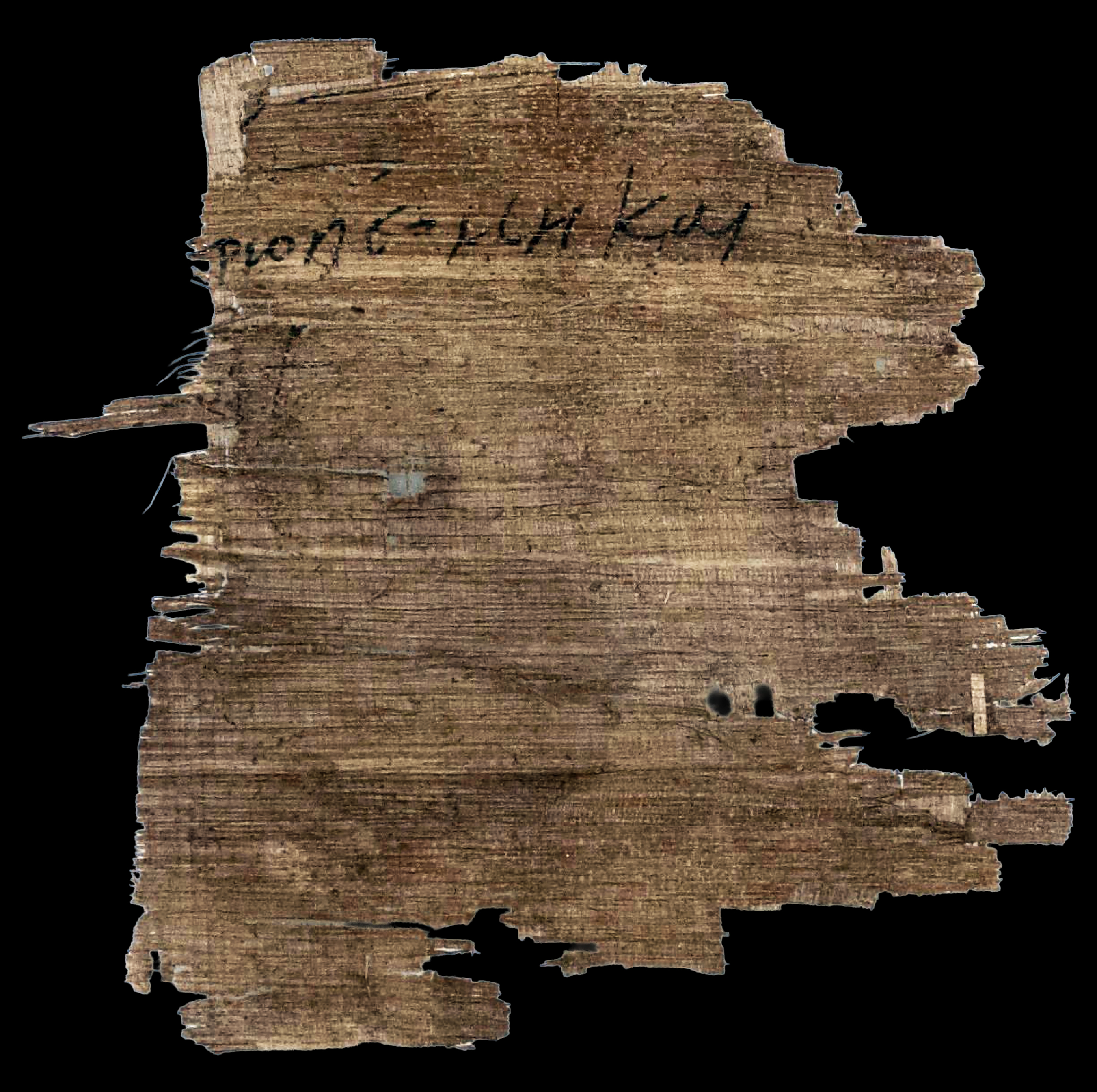
Verso, John 3:34

The Greek text of this codex probably is a representative of the Alexandrian text-type, but text is too brief too determine its textual character. Aland placed it in Category I (because of its date).

Location

It is currently housed at the Fundación Sant Lluc Evangelista (Inv. no. 83) in Barcelona.

== See also ==
- List of New Testament papyri
