= Papyrus 90 =

- New Testament manuscript
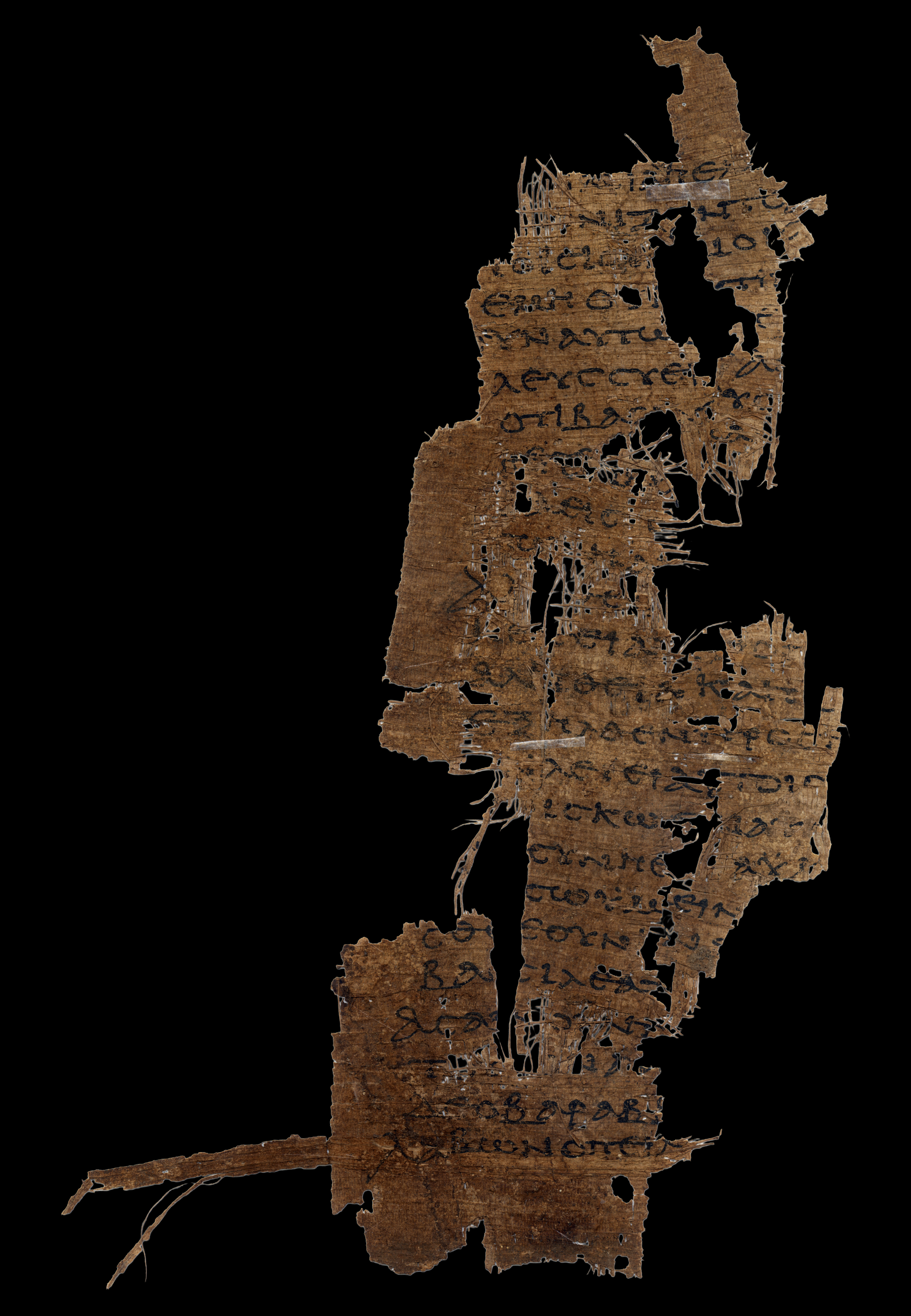
- Recto, John 18:36-19:1
- Name: P. Oxy L 3523
- Sign: 𝔓^{90}
- Text: John 18:36-19:1r+19:1-7v
- Date: c. 150-200
- Script: Greek
- Found: Oxyrhynchus, Egypt
- Now at: Papyrology Rooms, Sackler Library, Oxford
- Size: 16 x 12 cm
- Type: Alexandrian text-type
- Category: I

Papyrus 90, also known as P. Oxy. L 3523, is a small fragment from the Gospel of John 18:36-19:7. It is designated by the siglum 𝔓^{90} in the Gregory-Aland numbering of New Testament manuscripts. Using the study of comparative writing styles (palaeography), it has been assigned to the late 2nd century CE.

== Description ==
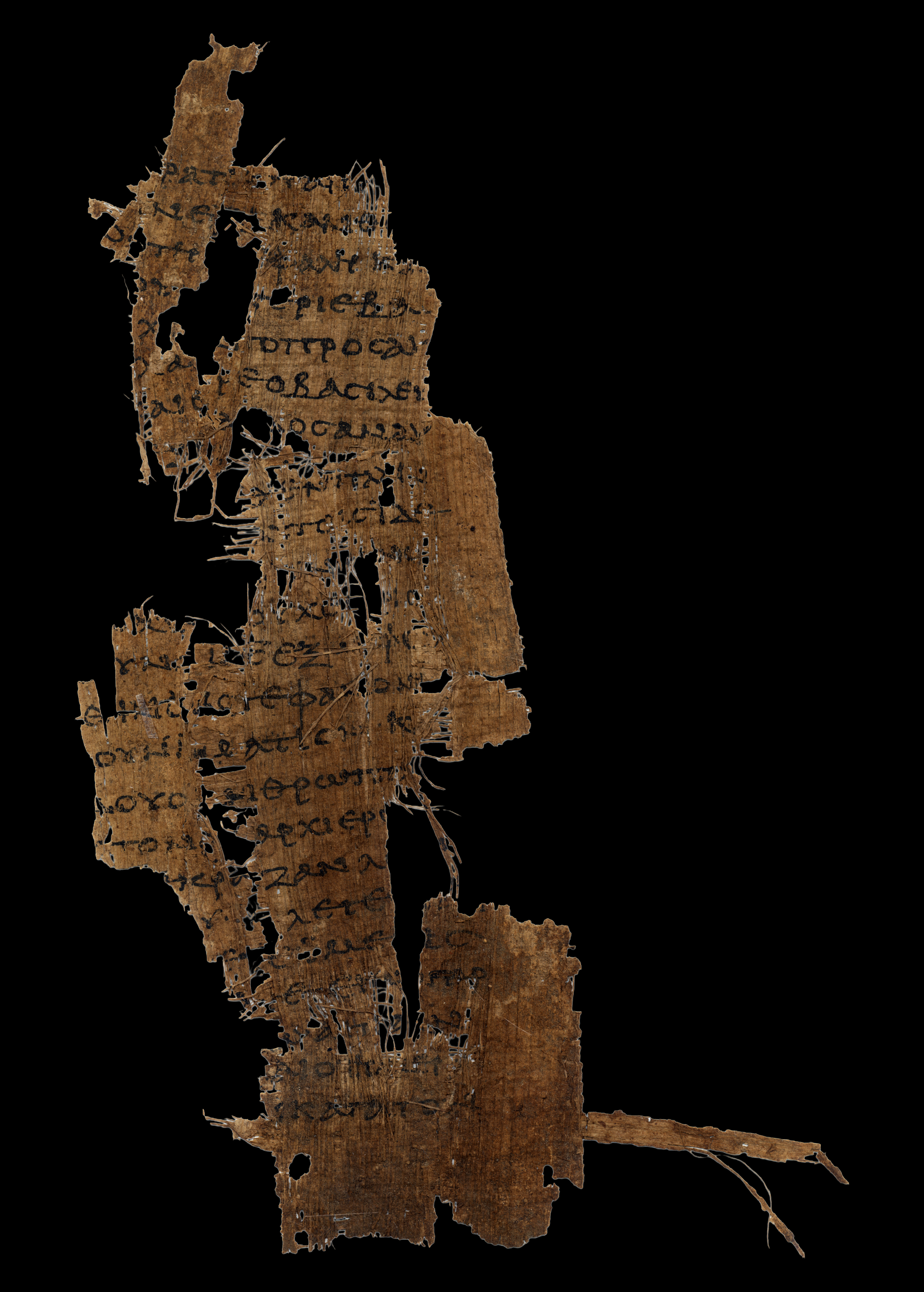
Verso, John 19:2-7

The papyrus is written on both sides, indicating this was likely a codex (the precursor to the modern book). It is currently housed at the Sackler Library (Papyrology Rooms, P. Oxy. 3523) in Oxford.

== Text ==
The Greek text of this codex is considered a representative of the Alexandrian text-type. Due to its early date, Biblical scholar Kurt Aland placed it in Category I of his New Testament classification system.

Papyrologist and biblical scholar Philip W. Comfort says "𝔓^{90} has [close] textual affinity with 𝔓^{66} ... [and] some affinity with Codex Sinaiticus (א)."

Transcription of Papyrus Manuscript

Letters in Bold are extant in the manuscript. Gospel of John 18:36-19:1 (recto)

BAΣIΛEIA H EMH OI YΠHPETAI OI EMOI
HΓΩNIZONTO AN INA MH ΠAPAΔOΘΩ
TOIΣ IOYΔAIOIΣ NYN ΔE H BAΣIΛEIA H
EMH OYK EΣTIN ENTEYΘEN EIΠEN
OYN AYTΩ O ΠEIΛATOΣ OYKOYN BAΣI-
ΛEYΣ ΣY EI AΠEKPIΘH O IΣE ΣY ΛEΓEIΣ
OTI BAΣIΛEYΣ EIMI EΓΩ EIΣ TOYTO
ΓEΓENNHMAI KAI EIΣ TOYTO EΛHΛYΘ-
A EIΣ TON KOΣMON INA MAPTYPH-
ΣΩ TH AΛHΘEIA ΠAΣ O ΩN EK THΣ
AΛHΘEIAΣ AKOYEI MOY THΣ ΦΩNHΣ
ΛEΓEI AYTΩ O ΠEIΛATOΣ TI EΣTIN
AΛHΘEIA KAI TOYTO EIΠΩN ΠAΛIN
EΞHΛΘEN ΠPOΣ TOYΣ IOYΔAIOYΣ
KAI ΛEΓEI AYTOIΣ EΓΩ OYΔEMIAN
EYPIΣKΩ EN AYTΩ AITIAN EΣTIN
ΔE ΣYNHΘEIA YMEIN INA ENA AΠ-
OΛYΣΩ YMEIN EN TΩ ΠAΣXA BOYΛE-
ΣΘE OYN INA AΠOΛYΣΩ YMIN TON
BAΣIΛEA TΩN IOYΔAIΩN EKPAYΓ-
AΣAN OYN ΠAΛIN ΛEΓONTEΣ MH
TOYTON AΛΛA TON BAPABBAN HN
DE O BAPABBAΣ ΛHΣTHΣ TOTE OYN
ΛABΩN O ΠEIΛATOΣ TON IΣE KAI EMA-

...

basileia ē emē oi upēretai oi emoi
ēgōnizonto an ina mē paradothō
tois ioudaiois nun de ē basileia ē
emē ouk estin enteuthen eipen
oun autō o peilatos oukoun basi-
leus su ei apekrithē o ise su legeis
oti basileus eimi egō eis touto
gegennēmai kai eis touto elēluth-
a eis ton kosmon ina marturē-
sō tē alētheia pas o ōn ek tēs
alētheias akouei mou tēs phōnēs
legei autō o peilatos ti estin
alētheia kai touto eipōn palin
exēlthen pros tous ioudaious
kai legei autois egō oudemian
euriskō en autō aitian estin
de sunētheia umien ina ena ap-
olusō umien en tō pascha boule-
sthe oun ina apolusō umin ton
basilea tōn ioudaiōn ekraug-
asan oun palin legontes mē
touton alla ton barabban ēn
de o barabbas lēstēs tote oun
labōn o peilatos ton ise kai ema-

...

kingdom, my servants for me would
fighteth, so that I would not be delivered
unto the Jews: but now this kingdom of
mine is not from hence. Said
therefore to him Pilate, "Then
a king thou art?" answered Jesus, "Thou said
that king I am. For this I
have been born, and for this
I have come into the world, so that
I would testify to the truth. Everyone who is of the
truth hears of me my voice."
Said to him Pilate, "What is
truth?" And this having said, again
he went out unto the Jews
and said to them, "I do not
find in him guilt.There is,
though, a custom for you, that
I should release unto you one at the Passover:
do you wish then that I would release unto you
the King of the Jews?"
They cried out so again, saying, "Not this
man, but Barabbas!"
Now Barabbas was a robber. Then therefore
Pilate took Jesus, and

...

Gospel of John 19:1-7 (verso)

ΣTIΓΩΣEN KAI OI ΣTPATIΩTAI ΠΛE-
ΞANTEΣ ΣTEΦANON EΞ AKANΘΩN
EΠEΘHKAN AYTOY TH KEΦAΛH KAI
IMATION ΠOPΦYPOYN ΠEPIEBA-
ΛON AYTON KAI HPXONTO ΠPOΣ AY-
TON KAI EΛEΓON XAIPE O BAΣIΛEY-
Σ TΩN IOYΔAIΩN KAI EΔIΔOΣAN AY-
TΩ PAΠIΣMATA EΞHΛΘEN ΠAΛIN
O ΠEIΛATOΣ KAI LEΓEI AYTOIΣ IΔE
AΓΩ YMIN AYTON EΞΩ INA ΓNΩ-
TE OTI AITIAN EN AYTΩ OYX EYPIΣ-
KΩ EΞHΛΘEN OYN O IΣE EΞΩ ΦOP-
ΩN TON AKANΘINON ΣTEΦANON
KAI TO ΠOPΦYPOYN IMATION KAI
ΛEΓEI AYTOIΣ IΔOY O ANΘPΩΠOΣ
OTE OYN EIΔON AYTON OI APXIEPEIΣ
KAI OI YΠHPETAI EKPAZAN LEΓON-
TEΣ ΣTAYPΩΣON AYTON ΛEΓEI AY-
TOIΣ O ΠEIΛATOΣ ΛABETE YMEIΣ
AYTON KAI ΣTAYPΩΣATE EΓΩ ΓAP
OYX EYPIΣKΩ EN AYTΩ AITIAN
AΠEKPIΘHΣAN OI IOYΔAIOI HMEIΣ
NOMON EXOMEN KAI KATA TON

...

stigōsen kai oi stratiōtai ple-
xantes stephanon ex akanthōn
epethēkan autou tē kephalē kai
imation porphuroun perieba-
lon auton kai ērchonto pros au-
ton kai elegon chaire o basileu-
s tōn ioudaiōn kai edidosan au-
tō rapismata exēlthen palin
o peilatos kai legei autois ide
agō umin auton exō ina gnō-
te oti aitian en autō ouch euris-
kō exēlthen oun o ise exō phor-
ōn ton akanthinon stephanon
kai to porphuroun imation kai
legei autois idou o anthrōpos
ote oun eidon auton oi archeireis
kai oi upēretai ekrazan legon-
tes staurōson auton legei au-
tois o peilatos labete umeis
auton kai staurōsate egō gar
ouch euriskō en autō aitian
apekrithēsan oi ioudaioi ēmeis
nomon echomen kai kata ton

...

scourged him. And the soldiers having
woven a crown of thorns,
they put it on his head, and
a robe of purple they put around
him, and they did come to him,
and they said "Hail, King
of the Jews!" and they gave him
blows with their hands. And went forth again
Pilate, and said unto them, "Behold,
I bring him to you forth, so that you may know
that fault in him I do not find."
Came forth then Jesus without, wearing
the crown of thorns,
and the purple robe. And
Pilate saith unto them, "Behold the man!"
When they so saw him, the chief priests
and officers cried out, saying,
"Crucify him!" Saith unto them
Pilate, "Take ye
him, and crucify him: for I
do not find in him guilt."
Answered the Jews, "We
have a law, and according to that

== See also ==
- List of New Testament papyri
- Oxyrhynchus Papyri

== Images ==
- High Resolution Digital Images of 𝔓^{90} from the University of Oxford's P.Oxy: Oxyrhyncus online
- Digital Images of 𝔓^{90} online at the CSNTM
