= Colin Henderson Roberts =

British classical scholar and publisher (1909–1990)

- Born: 8 June 1909; Stoke Newington
- Died: 11 February 1990 (aged 80); Broadwindsor
- Occupation: Classical scholar, papyrologist, editor, philologist, writer
- Employer: Oxford University Press
- Awards: Fellow of the British Academy; Commander of the Order of the British Empire

Colin Henderson Roberts CBE (8 June 1909 – 11 February 1990) was a classical scholar and publisher. He was Secretary to the Delegates of Oxford University Press between 1954 and 1974.

== Biography ==
Roberts was born on 8 June 1909 in Queen Elizabeth Walk, Stoke Newington, London. His elder brother, Brian Richard Roberts, was later the editor of The Sunday Telegraph. He was educated at Merchant Taylors' School and St John's College, Oxford, where he read Classics, taking Firsts in both Honour Moderations and literae humaniores and was elected to the Craven University Fellowship. In 1934 he was elected a Junior Research Fellow at St John's, and remained a fellow there until 1976.

Under the influence of his tutors, Roberts became interested in papyrology and in the history of the book in ancient times. He participated in the excavations at Karanis organized by the University of Michigan, and published some Biblical papyri in the collections of the John Rylands Library. During World War II, he worked in intelligence in London and Bletchley Park. In 1948 he was elected Reader in Documentary Papyrology at Oxford.

In 1954 Roberts succeeded A. L. P. Norrington as Secretary to the Delegates of Oxford University Press, holding the post until 1974. During his tenure he oversaw the publication of the New English Bible.

In 1960 he held the Sandars Readership in Bibliography at Cambridge University lecturing on "The earliest manuscripts of the Church: style and significance."

=== Awards ===
He was appointed CBE in 1973.

Roberts was elected a Fellow of the British Academy in 1947, but resigned (along with his friend T. C. Skeat) in 1979, in protest against its decision not to expel the Soviet spy Anthony Blunt from the fellowship.

== Works ==
- Manuscript, Society and Belief in Early Christian Egypt, C. H. Roberts, Hon. D. Litt., 1977.
- Birth of the Codex, by Colin Henderson Roberts, Theodore Cressy Skeat, 1954.
- Two Biblical Papyri in the John Rylands Library, Manchester, 1936.
- The Antinoopolis Papyri ... Edited with translations and notes,1950, by C. H. Robers, etc. With plates, by John Wintour Baldwin Barns, Colin Henderson Roberts
- Oxford Palaeographical Handbooks, 1955. General editors: R. W. Hunt, C. H. Roberts, F. Wormald
