= Names and titles of God in the New Testament =

In contrast to the variety of absolute or personal names of God in the Old Testament, the New Testament uses only two, according to the International Standard Bible Encyclopaedia. From the 20th century onwards, a number of scholars find various evidence for the name [YHWH or related form] in the New Testament.

With regard to the original documents that were later included, with or without modification, in the New Testament, George Howard put forward in 1977 a hypothesis, not widely accepted, that their Greek-speaking authors may have used some form of the Tetragrammaton (יהוה) in their quotations from the Old Testament but that in all copies of their works this was soon replaced by the existing two names.

== Names ==
In contrast to the variety of absolute or personal names of God in the Old Testament, several the title words are used the New Testament. Of the two common ones, Θεὀς ("God") is the more common, appearing in the text over a thousand times. In its true sense it expresses essential Deity, but by accommodation it is also used of heathen gods. The other is Κύριος ("Lord"), which appears almost 600 times. In quotations from the Old Testament, it represents both יהוה (Yahweh) and אדני (Adonai), the latter name having been used in Jewish worship to replace the former, the speaking of which was avoided even in the solemn reading of sacred texts. No transcription of either of the Hebrew names יהוה and אדני appears in the existing text of the New Testament; with only one exception, the ISR Scriptures 2009 version which uses the Hebrew text of the Tetragrammaton.

=== God ===
According to Walter A. Elwell and Robert W. Yarbrough, the term θεος (God) is used 1317 times. N. T. Wright differentiates between 'God' and 'god' when it refers to the deity or essentially a common noun. Murray J. Harris wrote that in NA^{26} (USB^{3}) θεος appears 1,315 times. The Bible Translator reads that "when referring to the one supreme God... it frequently is preceded, but need not be, by the definite article" (Ho theos).

=== Lord ===
The word κύριος appears 717 times in the text of New Testament, and Darrell L. Bock says it is used in three different ways:

First, it reflects the secular usages as the "lord" or "owner" of a vineyard (Matt. 21:40, Mark 12:9, Luke 20:13), master or slaves, or a political leader (Acts 25:26). Second, it certainly used of God. This usage is seen particularly in the numerous NT quotations from the OT where kyrios stands for Yahweh (e.g., Rom 4:8, Ps 32:2; Rom. 9:28–29, Isa. 10:22–23; Rom. 10:16, Isa. 53:1). Third, it is used of Jesus as kyrios (Matt. 10:24–25; John 13:16; 15:20; Rom 14:4; Eph. 6:5, 9; Col. 3:22: 4:1).

==== Angel of the Lord ====
The Greek phrase ἄγγελος Κυρίου (aggelos kuriou – "angel of the Lord") is found in Matthew 1:20, 1:24, 2:13, 2:19, 28:2; Luke 1:11, 2:9; John 5:4; Acts 5:19, 8:26, 12:7, and 12:23. English translations render the phrase either as "an angel of the Lord" or as "the angel of the Lord". The mentions in Acts 12:11 and Revelation 22:6 of "his angel" (the Lord's angel) can also be understood as referring either to the angel of the Lord or an angel of the Lord.

== Descriptive titles ==
Robert Kysar reports that God is referred to as Father 64 times in the first three Gospels and 120 times in the fourth Gospel. Outside of the Gospels he is called the Father of mercies (2 Corinthians 1:3), the Father of glory (Ephesians 1:17), the Father of mercies (the Father of spirits (Hebrews 12:9)), the Father of lights (James 1:17), and he is referred by the Aramaic word Abba in Romans 8:15.

Other titles under which God is referred to include the Almighty (Revelation 1:18), the Most High (Acts 7:48), the Creator (Romans 1:20; 2 Peter 1:4), and the Majesty on high (Hebrews 1:3).

== Extant New Testament manuscripts ==
No extant manuscript of the New Testament contains the Tetragrammaton in any form. In their citations of Old Testament verses, they always have κ̅ς̅ or θ̅ς̅, where the Hebrew text has YHWH.

There is a gap between the original writing (the autograph) of each of the various documents that were later incorporated into the New Testament and even the oldest surviving manuscript copies of the New Testament form of any such document. Philip Wesley Comfort says: "The time gap between the autograph and the extant copies is quite close − no more than one hundred years for most of the books of the New Testament. Thus we are in a good position to recover most of the original wording of the Greek New Testament.". Scholars assume the general reliability of the texts of ancient authors attested by extremely few manuscripts written perhaps a thousand years after their death: the New Testament is much better attested both in quantity and in antiquity of manuscripts. On the other hand, Helmut Koester says that the discovered papyri tell us nothing of the history of a text in the 100 to 150 years between when the original autograph was written and when its New Testament form was canonized. In line with the common view, Koester places canonization of the New Testament at the end of the second century. David Trobisch proposes a shorter interval, saying that a specific collection of Christian writings closely approximating the modern New Testament canon was edited and published before 180, probably by Polycarp (69–155).

Trobisch agrees with Howard that the autographs may have had some form of the tetragram, but holds that the edited texts in what we know as the New Testament are not the same as those autographs. The New Testament, he says, is an anthology with "editorial elements that serve to combine individual writings into a larger literary unit and are not original components of the collected traditional material". These editorial elements "can be identified by their late date, their unifying function, and the fact that they reflect a consistent editorial design; they "usually do not originate with the authors of the works published in an anthology"; instead, "responsibility for the final redaction rests with the editors and publisher". Trobisch states that "the New Testament contains both textual and non-textual elements of a final redaction", and in his book describes "some of the more obvious of these elements".

Howard remarks that the oldest known New Testament fragments contain no verse quoting an Old Testament verse that has the Tetragrammaton. These fragments are: 𝔓^{52}, 𝔓^{90}, 𝔓^{98} and 𝔓^{104}. Fragments that do contain quotations of Old Testament verses containing the tetragrammaton are at earliest from 175 CE onward (𝔓^{46}, 𝔓^{66}, 𝔓^{75}).

Jacobus H. Petzer, citing Harry Y. Gamble, K. Junack and Barbara Aland in support, distinguishes between "the original text" of the New Testament and "the autographs" of the documents it incorporated. There is a gap of about a century (more in the case of the letters of Paul the Apostle, less in the case of elements such as the Gospel of John) between the composition of the actual autograph documents, the original incorporation of a version of them into the New Testament, and the production of the extant New Testament manuscripts in which, according to the Howard hypothesis, the Tetragrammaton might once have been written, before being eliminated without trace from all existing manuscripts.

Howard points to some twenty single-letter variations in the Greek New Testament manuscripts between κ̅ς̅ and θ̅ς̅, among the hundreds of other appearances of these two nomina sacra. In response to a correspondent who said that Howard "cited the large number of variants involving theos and kurios as evidence for the originality of the divine name in the New Testament itself", Larry Hurtado replied: "Well, maybe so. But his theory doesn't take adequate account of all the data, including the data that 'kyrios' was used as a/the vocal substitute for YHWH among Greek-speaking Jews. There's no indication that the Hebrew YHWH ever appeared in any NT text." He also noted the choice by the author of the Acts of the Apostles to use Θεός rather than Κύριος when reporting speeches to and by the Jews.

Variance between some verses
NT verse	κ̅ς̅ (Lord)	θ̅ς̅ (God)	χ̅ς̅ (Christ)	Ι̅ς̅ (Jesus)	Omit
Acts 8:22	Greek mss.	Vg, Sy^{p}			
Acts 8:24	א, A, B	D, Vg, Sy			
Acts 8:25	א, B, C, D	𝔓^{74}, A, Sy			
Acts 10:33	𝔓^{45}, א, A, B, C	𝔓^{74}, D, Sy			
Acts 12:24	B	𝔓^{74}, א, A, D, Sy			
Acts 13:44	𝔓^{74}, א, A, B	B, C, Sy			
Acts 14:48	𝔓^{45}, 𝔓^{74}, א, A, C	B, D			
Acts 15:35	Greek mss.	Sy^{p}			
Acts 15:36	Greek mss.	Sy^{p}			
Acts 15:40	Greek mss.	Vg^{c}, Vg^{s}, Sy^{p}			
Acts 16:15	א, A, B, Greek mss.	D			
Acts 16:32	𝔓^{45}, 𝔓^{74}, א^{c} (corrector), A, C	א, B			
Acts 19:20	Greek mss.	Vg, Sy^{p}			
Romans 4:8	א, A, B				𝔓^{46}
Romans 10:17		א^{c}, A, D^{b, c}, K, P, Ψ, min versions, Fathers	𝔓^{46}, א, B, C, D*, min version, Fathers		G, It^{f,g}, Fathers
Romans 11:2		א, A, B			𝔓^{46}
Romans 11:3	א, A, B				𝔓^{46}
Romans 11:8		𝔓^{46}, A, C, D, F, G: ο θς; א: ο ο θς			
Romans 11:34	א, A, B				𝔓^{46}
Romans 14:4	𝔓^{46}, א, A, B, C, Greek mss.	D, Vg, Sy^{h}			
Romans 14:10		א*, A, B, C*, D, G, min versions, Fathers	א^{c}, C^{2}, P, Ψ		
Romans 15:11	א^{2}			א*, A, B	
1 Corinthians 2:16	B, D*, G, it		rell		
1 Corinthians 7:17	𝔓^{46}, א, A, B, C, Greek mss.	Sy^{h}, TR			
1 Corinthians 10:9	א, B, C, P, 33, min versions, Fathers	A, 81, Euthalius	𝔓^{46}, D, G, K, Ψ, min versions, Fathers		1985
2 Corinthians 8:21	א, B	𝔓^{46}, Vg, Sy^{p}			
Ephesians 5:17	א, D, Greek mss.	A, Vg^{c}, Sy^{p}			
Colossians 1:10	א, A, B, Greek mss.	Vg			
Colossians 3:13	𝔓^{46}, A, B, D	א			
Colossians 3:16	א	A, C			
Colossians 3:22	א, A, B, C, D, Greek mss.	𝔓^{46}, א^{c}, D^{c} (corrector)			
Thessalonians 1:8	א^{c}, B, Greek mss.	א			
Thessalonians 2:13	א, A, B, Greek mss.	D, Vg			
James 1:12	C, Greek mss.	It, Vg, Sy^{p}			
James 3:9	א, A, B, C, Greek mss.	Vg^{c}, Sy^{h}			
1 Peter 1:25	א, A, B, Greek	Sy^{p}			
1 Peter 3:15		K, L, P, min Fathers	𝔓^{72}, א, A, B, C, Ψ, min versions, Clement		de Promissionibus
2 Peter 3:12	C	א, A, B			
Jude 5	א, C, K, Ψ, min Syr^{h}, Fathers	C^{c}, 2492, versions, Lucifer	𝔓^{72}	A, B, min versions, Fathers	
Jude 9	A, B	א			
Revelation 18:8	א^{c}, C	A			

According to Howard, the presence of the Tetragrammaton that he envisages within the New Testament lasted very briefly: he speaks of it as "crowded out" already "somewhere around the beginning of the second century".

R. F. Shedinger considered it "at least possible" that Howard's theory may find support in the regular use in the Diatessaron (which, according to Ulrich B. Schmid "antedates virtually all the MSS of NT") of "God" in place of "Lord" in the New Testament and the Peshitto Old Testament, but he stressed that "Howard's thesis is rather speculative and the textual evidence he cites from the New Testament in support of it is far from overwhelming."

In studies conducted among existing variants in New Testament copies, the vast majority of scholars agree that the New Testament has remained fairly stable with only many minor variants (Daniel B. Wallace, Michael J. Kruger, Craig A. Evans, Edward D. Andrews, Kurt Aland, Barbara Aland, F. F. Bruce, Fenton Hort, Brooke Foss Westcott, Frederic G. Kenyon, Jack Finegan, Archibald Thomas Robertson). Some critics, such as Kurt Aland, deny that there is any basis whatever for conjectural emendation of the manuscript evidence. Bart D. Ehrman, Helmut Koester, David C. Parker believe that it is not possible to establish the original text with absolute certainty, but do not posit a systematic revision as in the Howard hypothesis.

The oldest extant Greek New Testament manuscript fragments.
Date	Quantity	Manuscripts
Second century	4	𝔓^{52}, 𝔓^{90}, 𝔓^{98}, 𝔓^{104}
Second/third-centuries	3	𝔓^{67}, 𝔓^{103}, Uncial 0189
175—225	4	𝔓^{32}, 𝔓^{46}, 𝔓^{64}+𝔓^{67}, 𝔓^{66}
Third century	40	𝔓^{1}, 𝔓^{4}, 𝔓^{5}, 𝔓^{9}, 𝔓^{12}, 𝔓^{15}, 𝔓^{20}, 𝔓^{22}, 𝔓^{23}, 𝔓^{27}, 𝔓^{28}, 𝔓^{29}, 𝔓^{30}, 𝔓^{39}, 𝔓^{40}, 𝔓^{45}, 𝔓^{47}, 𝔓^{48}, 𝔓^{49}, 𝔓^{53}, 𝔓^{65}, 𝔓^{69}, 𝔓^{70}, 𝔓^{75}, 𝔓^{80}, 𝔓^{87}, 𝔓^{91}, 𝔓^{95}, 𝔓^{101}, 𝔓^{106}, 𝔓^{107}, 𝔓^{108}, 𝔓^{109}, 𝔓^{111}, 𝔓^{113}, 𝔓^{114}, 𝔓^{118}, 𝔓^{119}, 𝔓^{121}, 0220
Third/fourth centuries	16	𝔓^{7}, 𝔓^{13}, 𝔓^{16}, 𝔓^{18}, 𝔓^{37}, 𝔓^{38}, 𝔓^{72}, 𝔓^{78}, 𝔓^{92}, 𝔓^{100}, 𝔓^{102}, 𝔓^{115}, 𝔓^{125}, 0162, 0171, 0312

== Nomina sacra in the New Testament ==
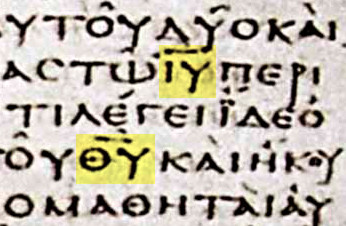
Nomina sacra (Ι̅Υ̅ for Ίησοῦ, Jesus, and Θ̅Υ̅ for Θεοῦ, God) in John 1:35–37 in the 4th-century Codex Vaticanus

Nomina sacra, representations of religiously important words in a way that sets them off from the rest of the text, are a characteristic of manuscripts of the New Testament. "There are good reasons to think that these abbreviations were not concerned with saving space but functioned as a textual way to show Christian reverence and devotion to Christ alongside of God".

Philip Wesley Comfort places in the first century the origin of five nomina sacra: those indicating "Lord", "Jesus", "Christ", "God" and "Spirit", and considers Κ̅Σ̅ (Κύριος) to have been the earliest. Tomas Bokedal also assigns to the first century the origin of the same nomina sacra, omitting only πνεῦμα. Michael J. Kruger says that, for the nomina sacra convention to be so widespread as is shown in manuscripts of the early second century, its origin must be placed earlier.

George Howard supposes that κ̅ς̅ (κύριος) and θ̅ς̅ (θεός) were the initial nomina sacra and were created by (non-Jewish Christian scribes who in copying the Septuagint text "found no traditional reasons to preserve the tetragrammaton" (which in his hypothesis they found in the Septuagint text) and who perhaps looked on the contracted forms κ̅ς̅ and θ̅ς̅ as "analogous to the vowelless Hebrew Divine Name".

Larry Hurtado rejects this view, preferring that of Colin Roberts, according to whom the initial nomen sacrum was that representing the name Ἰησοῦς (Jesus). Hurtado's view is shared by Tomas Bokedal, who holds that the first nomen sacrum was that of Ἰησοῦς (initially in the suspended form ι̅η̅), soon followed by that of Χριστός and then by Κύριος and Θεός. Since all Hebrew words are written without vowels, the vowelless character of the tetragrammaton cannot have inspired, Hurtado says, the creation of the nomina sacra, which moreover, as in the case of κύριος, also omit consonants.

George Howard considered that the change to the nomina sacra κ̅ς̅ and θ̅ς̅ instead of YHWH in Christian copies of the Septuagint took place "at least by the beginning of the second century": it began "towards the end of the first century", and "somewhere around the beginning of the second century [...] must have crowded out the Tetragram in both Testaments". Already by the late second century nomina sacra were used not only in New Testament manuscripts but also in inscriptions in Lycaonia (modern central Turkey). David Trobisch proposes that the replacement of YHWH to nomina sacra was a conscious editorial decision at the time of compiling both New and Old Testaments, in the second century.

While Howard supposed that the New Testament writers took their Old Testament quotations directly from Septuagint manuscripts (which he also supposed contained the Tetragrammaton), Philip Wesley Comfort believes they took them from Testimonia (excerpts from the Old Testament that Christians compiled as proof texts for their claims). He recognizes that the earliest extant evidence of the use of nomina sacra is found in second-century manuscripts of the Septuagint rather than of such Testimonia or of the New Testament, and comments: "Regardless of whether the nomina sacra were invented in the testimonia stage or in early Christian Greek Old Testament manuscripts (i.e., first century), the significance is that they may have existed in written form before the Gospels and Epistles were written. As such, some of the New Testament writers themselves could have adopted these forms when they wrote their books. The presence of the nomina sacra in all the earliest Christian manuscripts dating from the early second century necessitates that it was a widespread practice established much earlier. If we place the origin of that practice to the autographs and/or early publications of the New Testament writings, it explains the universal proliferation thereafter." He pictures the nomina sacra entering Christian copies of the Septuagint in the same way as in Papyrus Oxyrhynchus 656 the original scribe left gaps for someone capable of writing Hebrew or Palaeo-Hebrew to fill in with the Tetragrammaton, but that were in fact filled with the word κύριος.

Forms corresponding to the MT Tetragrammaton in some Greek OT and NT manuscripts
Date	LXX/OG mss	Forms in LXX/OG mss	NT mss	Forms in NT mss
1st century BCE	4Q120; P. Fouad 266	ιαω יהוה		
Early 1st century CE	P. Oxy 3522; 8HevXII gr	𐤉𐤄𐤅𐤄 𐤉𐤄𐤅𐤄		
Middle to late 1st century CE	P. Oxy 5101 (c. 50–150)	𐤉𐤄𐤅𐤄	No mss, original or published	No evidence
Early 2nd century CE	P. Oxy. 4443 (c. 75–125)	No evidence	𝔓^{125}	No evidence
Middle 2nd century CE	P. Baden 56b P. Antinoopolis 7	No evidence No evidence	No mss	No evidence
Late 2nd century CE	P.Coll Horsley (c. 175–225); P. Oxy 656 (c. 175–225)	No evidence κς by second hand	𝔓^{46, 75} (c. 175–225)	κς
3rd century CE	P. Oxy 1007 (c. 175–225); P. Oxy 1075; Sym^{P.Vindob.G.39777}	~~zz~~ κς YHWH in archaic form	𝔓^{66} (c. 200) 𝔓^{45} (Early third century)	κς
4th century CE	B^{LXX} א^{LXX}	κς, θς κς, θς	B^{NT} א^{NT}	κς, θς κς, θς

== The Howard hypothesis ==
The tetragrammaton (YHWH) is not found in any extant New Testament manuscript, all of which have the word Kyrios (Lord) or Theos (God) in Old Testament quotes where the Hebrew text has the tetragrammaton. George Howard published in 1977 a thesis that Robert F. Shedinger calls "somewhat speculative", and whose "revolutionary theological ramifications" Howard himself drew out. He proposed that the original texts of the New Testament had "YHWH" (either in Hebrew characters or in a Greek transliteration) in their quotations from the Old Testament, but not elsewhere, and that it was replaced in the copies made during the second century.

Didier Fontaine observes that Howard's postulate is built on three further suppositions:

[Howard's] thesis boils down to simply this: it is possible that when quoting the OT, the NT authors retained the tetragram in their writings where it figured in the Greek text [i.e., the Septuagint]. Three observations allow this postulate: 1) the translators of the LXX retained the divine name in Hebrew or paleo-Hebrew in the Greek text—that, at least, is what the manuscripts of the pre-Christian era indicate; 2) it was the Christians, not the Jews, who replaced these instances of the name with κύριος; and 3) the textual tradition of the NT contains variants that are explained well in this context."

In his concluding observations, Howard, recognizing "the revolutionary nature" of his thesis that at one time the tetragrammaton was employed in the New Testament, said that, if true, it would require further explanation on various questions:

If the Tetragram was used in the NT, how extensively was it used? Was it confined to OT quotations and OT paraphrastic allusions, or was it used in traditional phrases, such as "the word of God / Lord" (see the variants in Acts 6:7; 8:25; 12:24; 13:5; 13:44, 48; 14:25; 16:6, 32), "in the day of the Lord" (cf. variants in 1 Cor 5:5), "through the will of God" (cf. variants in Rom 15:32)? Was it also used in OT-like narratives such as we have in the first two chapters of Luke?

Fontaine continues: "The thesis of Howard has generally aroused negative reactions, like those of C. Osburn, D. Juel or Bruce M. Metzger. In the case of Metzger, Shaw shows how Howard's thesis has perhaps been distorted and cited in the wrong way." Fontaine indicates that dictation, in which what was communicated was the spoken equivalent of the Tetragrammaton, generally a surrogate (such as kurios, not the Tetragrammaton itself) shows that the text of a Septuagint manuscript or of an original letter of Paul the Apostle could differ from that in an existing copy of the Septuagint and would thus explain the textual variations adduced in support of Howard's thesis.

Robert J. Wilkinson rejects Howard's hypothesis: "It is not possible to assert that all Jewish Greek biblical manuscripts had the Tetragrammaton, nor for that matter that someone reading a Tetragrammaton in a biblical text would necessarily transcribe it into another text as such rather than as, say, kurios [...] this conjectured account has Christians initially quoting biblical texts in their own writings to make a clear distinction between Christ and Yhwh and then introducing 'confusion' by deciding to eliminate the Tetragrammaton from their own works. One may ask why they would do that and when." He says that Howard's article was influential with regard to certain "denominational interests", whom he identifies as those of the Jehovah's Witnesses, whose enthusiastic response perhaps somewhat obscured the clarity of the situation of "total absence of the Hebrew Tetragrammaton from all recovered early Christian Greek New Testament manuscripts and their texts".

Larry W. Hurtado remarks: "Against the contentions of a few (e.g., George Howard), these remarkable developments ["at a remarkably early point the exalted Jesus was associated with YHWH, such that practices and texts that originally applied to YHWH were 'extended' (so to speak) to include Jesus as the further referent"] cannot be ascribed to some sort of textual confusion brought on by a supposedly later copyist practice of writing 'Kyrios' in place of YHWH in Greek biblical manuscripts. The developments in question exploded so early and so quickly to render any such a proposal irrelevant."

=== Howard and the Septuagint ===
In 1977, George Howard propounded in the scholarly Journal of Biblical Literature his theory that "towards the end of the first century" (when the most recent of the New Testament writings were still appearing) Christians had already begun to use nomina sacra in place of the Tetragrammaton. While in non-biblical material Jews freely used either the Tetragrammaton or a substitute such as κύριος, in copying the biblical text itself they carefully guarded the Tetragrammaton, a practice that they extended to translation into Greek but not into Aramaic (p. 72); but, Howard said, in the earliest extant copies of the Christian LXX the tetragrammaton is not to be found and is almost universally replaced by κύριος (p. 74). "In all probability", he said, "the Tetragram in the Christian LXX began to be surrogated with the contracted words κ̅ς̅ and θ̅ς̅ at least by the beginning of the second century" (pp. 74−75). "Towards the end of the first century", he said, "Gentile Christians [...] substituted the words κύριος and θεός [...] for the Tetragram" (pp. 76−77). Howard's theory was that, in the interval between the writing of the texts that were later compiled to form the New Testament and the adoption of these surrogates, quotations in those texts would have the Tetragrammaton: "It is reasonable to believe that the NT writers, when quoting from Scripture, preserved the Tetragram within the biblical text. On the analogy of pre-Christian Jewish practice we can imagine that the NT text incorporated the Tetragram into its OT quotations and that the words κύριος and θεός were used when secondary references to God were made in the comments that were based upon the quotations. The Tetragram in these quotations would, of course, have remained as long as it continued to be used in the Christian copies of the LXX. But when it was removed from the Greek OT, it was also removed from the quotations of the OT in the NT. Thus somewhere around the beginning of the second century the use of surrogates must have crowded out the Tetragram in both Testaments" (p. 77).

In the following year 1978, Howard wrote in the popular-style Biblical Archaeology Review: "I offer the following scenario of the history of the Tetragrammaton in the Greek Bible as a whole, including both testaments. First, as to the Old Testament, Jewish scribes always preserved the Tetragrammaton in their copies of the Septuagint both before and after the New Testament period. In all probability Jewish Christians wrote the Tetragrammaton in Hebrew as well. Toward the end of the first Christian century, when the church had become predominantly Gentile, the motive for retaining the Hebrew name for God was lost and the words kyrios and theos were substituted for it in Christian copies of Old Testament Septuagints. Both kyrios and theos were written in abbreviated form in a conscious effort to preserve the sacred nature of the divine name. Soon the original significance of the contractions was lost and many other contracted words were added. A similar pattern probably evolved with respect to the New Testament. When the Septuagint which the New Testament church used and quoted contained the Hebrew form of the divine name, the New Testament writers no doubt included the Tetragrammaton in their quotations. But when the Hebrew form for the divine name was eliminated in favor of Greek substitutes in the Septuagint, it was eliminated also from the New Testament quotations of the Septuagint."

Howard thus bases his hypothesis on the proposition that the Septuagint, the version of the Old Testament in Greek from which the first-century-CE authors of the New Testament drew their Old-Testament quotations, did not at that time contain the term κύριος that is found in the extant manuscripts of the full text of the Septuagint, all of which are of later date, but always had the tetragrammaton itself, written in Hebrew letters (יהוה) or in paleo-Hebrew script (𐤉𐤄𐤅𐤄) or represented by the phonetic Greek transliteration ιαω in place of that Greek term.

Five fragmentary manuscripts containing parts of the Septuagint and having a bearing on the first century CE have been discovered:

1. 1st-century-BCE 4Q120 with text from Leviticus uses ιαω where the Masoretic Text has the Tetragrammaton;
2. 1st-century-BCE Papyrus Fouad 266b with text from Deuteronomy uses יהוה forty-nine times and another three times in fragments whose text has not been identified;
3. 1st-century-CE 8HevXII gr with text from the Minor Prophets in a revision of the Septuagint uses 𐤉𐤄𐤅𐤄 twenty-eight times;
4. 1st-century-CE Papyrus Oxyrhynchus 3522 with Job 42.11–12 uses 𐤉𐤄𐤅𐤄 twice;
5. 1st-century-CE Papyrus Oxyrhynchus 5101 with text from Psalms uses 𐤉𐤄𐤅𐤄 three times.

=== Septuagint treatment of the Hebrew-text tetragrammaton ===
Albert Pietersma takes issue with Howard's claim that "we can now say with almost absolute certainty that the divine name, יהוה, was not rendered by κύριος in the pre-Christian Bible". He holds that the Septuagint Pentateuch originally contained κύριος, and that the hebraizing insertion of the tetragrammaton in some copies can be seen as "a secondary and foreign intrusion into LXX tradition".

In 2013, Larry W. Hurtado stated: "In Septuagint manuscripts (dating from ca. 3rd century CE and later), "Kyrios" (Greek: "Lord") is used rather frequently. But some have proposed that the earliest practice was fairly consistently to translate YHWH with "Kyrios" (κυριος), others that the Hebrew divine name was initially rendered phonetically as ΙΑΩ ("Iao"), and others that the divine name was originally retained in Hebrew characters. To my knowledge, the most recent discussion of the matter is the recent journal article by Martin Rösel".

Martin Rösel holds that the Septuagint used κύριος to represent the Tetragrammaton of the Hebrew text and that the appearance of the Hebrew Tetragrammaton in some copies of the Septuagint is due to a later substitution for the original κύριος: "By means of exegetical observations in the Greek version of the Torah, it becomes clear that already the translators of the Septuagint have chosen 'Lord' (kyrios) as an appropriate representation of the tetragrammaton; the replacement by the Hebrew tetragrammaton in some Greek manuscripts is not original." He recalls that, although κύριος was obviously the name that early Christians read in their Greek Bible, "Jewish versions of the Greek Bible, including Aquila and Symmachus as well as a few LXX manuscripts," had the Tetragrammaton in Hebrew letters or the form ΠΙΠΙ imitating Hebrew יהוה and also recalls the arguments for the originality of the Greek transcription ΙΑΩ. However, in view of the inconclusive nature of the analysis of the manuscripts, he proposes evidence internal to the Septuagint text that suggests that "κύριος is the original representation of the first translators", delimiting his research in this matter to the Pentateuch texts, since these were the earliest and provide a glimpse of a translator's theological thinking, for, as he said earlier, "the translators of the Septuagint were influenced by theological considerations when choosing an equivalent for the divine name". In some contexts, to avoid giving the impression of injustice or harshness on the part of κύριος, they represent the Tetragrammaton instead by θεός. Thus the immediate context explains the use of θεός as avoidance of the default translation as κύριος, while "it is hardly conceivable that later scribes should have changed a Hebrew tetragrammaton or Greek ΙΑΩ into a form of ὁ θεός". The presence of κύριος in the deuterocanonical books not translated from Hebrew but composed originally (like the New Testament) in Greek and in the works of Philo shows, Rösel says, that "the use of κύριος as a representation of יהוה must be pre-Christian in origin". He adds that this use was not universal among Jews, as shown by the later replacement of the original Septuaginta κύριος by the Hebrew Tetragrammaton; and he says that "the ΙΑΩ readings in the biblical manuscript 4QLXXLevb are a mystery still awaiting sound explanation. What can be said, is that such readings cannot be claimed to be original."

Dominique Gonnet says that "there are actually several textual forms of the [Septuagint]: the old LXX, the LXX realigned on the Hebrew before the Christian era and at the beginning of this one [...] There are also Jewish revisions of the LXX undertaken during the turn of the Christian era [...] New Testament writers often quote the old LXX, but sometimes they use an LXX that has evolved from the older LXX. They even quote Jewish revisions."

Ernst Wurthwein and Alexander Achilles Fischer find unconvincing the view that the tetragrammaton was original in the Septuagint, and that among the thousands of copies that have now perished there were none with κύριος. They state: "The typical LXX rendering of the Tetragrammaton as κύριος must have extended back into the pre-Christian era, although there is no evidence for it in the early manuscripts".

Mª Vª Spottorno y Díaz Caro writes that one cannot rule out the possibility that the expression "Lord" (κύριος in Greek, מרא in Aramaic) as the name of God was already in use among Jews at about the time when the Septuagint was created. Her study centres on Papyrus 967 from the end of the 2nd century or early 3rd century CE, the oldest extant manuscript of the Septuagint text of Ezekiel 12–48, also containing Daniel and Esther in a text anterior to Origen's Hexapla, perhaps even of the first century. She believes that its use of the nomen sacrum form of κύριος (318 times) does not necessarily mean that it was the work of a Christian scribe. She repeats J.A. Fitzmyer's question: While the use of κύριος for יהוה in Christian copies of the Septuagint may perhaps be attributed to the influence of the New Testament, where did the New Testament itself get the usage from? She suggests that it came from use of κύριος for יהוה by Greek-speaking Palestinian Jews, and she cites Howard's assertion that from at least the third century BCE אדני was used in speech for יהוה, as suggested also by Qumran manuscripts of Ben Sira and Psalm 151 and by Philo's use of κύριος for יהוה in his Old Testament quotations. She accepts that the evidence comes from manuscripts of the Christian era and is therefore inconclusive, but she considers doubtful any explanation as due to Christian influence in the 1st or 2nd century the pronunciation of יהוה as κύριος by Hellenistic Jews.

Pietersma agrees with Dahl and Segal that, "while preserved Jewish fragments of the Greek version have some form of transliteration for the tetragrammaton, Philo must have read kyrios in his texts", and then he adds that: "there is only one way to negate the force of Philo's evidence on the equation of kyrios and the tetragram, and that is by making a distinction between what Philo saw in his Bible and what he understood and read, but that issue we will turn to at a later point". (On this, see the view of Royse, below.)

In 1957, Patrick W. Skehan proposed four chronological stages in the writing of the name of God in some books of the Greek Septuagint: 1. Ιαω; 2. יהוה in the usual Aramaic script; 3. 𐤉𐤅𐤄𐤅 in Paleo-Hebrew script; and finally 4. κύριος. Writing of the then as yet unpublished manuscript 4QpapLXXLev^{b}, which contains the form Ιαω, he said: "This new evidence strongly suggests that the usage in question goes back for some books at least to the beginnings of the Septuagint rendering." By 1980, he had modified his view to the extent of explicitly excluding the prophetic books, much of which, he said, "comes to hand with its earliest attainable stage showing leanings toward Κύριος ὁ θεός as an equivalent for אדני יהוה, in accordance with the Palestinian qěrē. Also, as far back as it is possible to go, the Kyrios term is employed in these books for both יהוה and אדני, on the basis of the spoken Adonay that stood for either separately [...] This cannot have come about as exclusively the work of Christian scribes".

Emanuel Tov states that "the writing of the Tetragrammaton in Hebrew characters in Greek revisional texts is a relatively late phenomenon. On the basis of the available evidence, the analysis of the original representation of the Tetragrammaton in Greek Scriptures therefore focuses on the question of whether the first translators wrote either κύριος or Ιαω".

Robert J. Wilkinson cites George Kilpatrick as expressly contradicting Howard in a review of his theory by suggesting that "the early Christian LXX documents were essentially private, less expensive, less elaborate, non-calligraphic copies – with, possibly, kurios for the Tetragrammaton". Anthony R. Meyer, as indicated below, just as expressly says that "the Septuagint manuscripts of the first century CE, which Philo and NT authors rely on for their quotations, could well have contained κύριος, but this does necessarily require that κύριος goes back to the Old Greek translation."

John William Wevers "registers agreement with Albert Pietersma's argument that the use of the Hebrew YHWH in some Old Greek manuscripts (as well as other devices, e.g., ΙΑΩ, ΠΙΠΙ), represents 'a revision' that took place within the textual transmission of the Greek of the Hebrew scriptures". Lincoln H. Blumell also holds that the Tetragrammaton in Septuagint manuscripts was due to a tendency of Jewish copyists "to substitute the Hebrew tetragrammaton (YHWH) for κύριος". Larry Perkins also agrees with Pietersma: "This study accepts the hypothesis that the original translators used κύριος as the rendering of the Tetragram". And Raija Sollamo states that "Pietersma refuted the arguments put forward in 1977 by George Howard in his article 'Tetragram and the New Testament'." Eugene Ulrich says that Pietersma's argument goes against the "early, even pre-Christian, MS evidence" for ΙΑΩ, and adds that "it is difficult to imagine a scribe introducing the not-to-be-pronounced divine name where the more reverent κύριος was already in the text", and declares possible the view that the original Old Greek text had ΙΑΩ, replaced later by the Tetragrammaton in either normal or archaic Hebrew letters or by κύριος, the view expressed with regard to the Septuagint translation of the Pentateuch, but not of the writings of the prophets, by Skehan. Ulrich sees a parallel with this Ιαω-Κύριος substitution in the replacement of the Tetragrammaton in a Hebrew Qumran scroll by אדני (Adonai).

In contradiction to what Skehan says of the prophetic books of the Septuagint, Frank Crüsemann says that all extant unequivocally Jewish fragments of the Septuagint render God's name in Hebrew letters or else with special signs of different kinds, and it can accordingly even be assumed that the texts the New Testament authors knew looked like those fragments; he does not say that the writers themselves would have used either of these ways of representing the Hebrew Tetragram rather than as he says Christian manuscripts of the Septuagint represent it: with Κύριος.

Sean M. McDonough declares implausible the idea, on which Howard's hypothesis is based, that κύριος first appeared in the Septuagint only when the Christian era had begun. He says the idea is convincingly contradicted by the testimony both of Philo (c. 20 BCE – c. 50 CE) and of the New Testament itself. Howard's attribution to Christian copyists the consistent use of κύριος as a designation for God in Philo's writings is countered by Philo's frequent interpretation and even the etymology of the word κύριος. As for the New Testament, even its earliest manuscript fragments have no trace of the use of the Tetragrammaton that Howard hypothesizes and which in some passages of Paul would even be ungrammatical. While some Septuagint manuscripts have forms of the Tetragrammaton, and while some argue that κύριος was not in the original Septuagint, it is certain that, when the New Testament was written, some manuscripts did have κύριος.

David B. Capes admits that Philo's text, as now extant, has been transmitted by Christian scholars, and cites the argument that Howard based on this fact. However, he follows James R. Royse in concluding that Philo, while using manuscripts that had the Tetragrammaton, quotes them as they were pronounced in the synagogue. Capes declares accordingly: "Philo, not Christian copyists, is likely responsible for the presence of kyrios in his biblical quotations and exposition".

Robert J. Wilkinson remarks that evidence from manuscripts of the Septuagint is inconclusive about what was in what the New Testament writers read ("While no indisputably early Jewish Greek biblical manuscript currently known has contained kurios, no early indisputably Christian Greek biblical [New Testament] manuscript has been found with the Tetragrammaton written in paleo-Hebrew or Aramaic script or with 'pipi'"), there is no doubt about what they wrote ("We may be uncertain what the New Testament writers read in Scripture on any particular occasion (and how far they pronounced what they had read), but there is no question [...] of what they wrote).

Speaking of the Qumran manuscript, the Greek Minor Prophets Scroll from Nahal Hever, which is a kaige recension of the Septuagint, "a revision of the Old Greek text to bring it closer to the Hebrew text of the Bible as it existed in ca. 2nd-1st century BCE" (not a faithful copy of the original), Kristin De Troyer remarks: "The problem with a recension is that one does not know what is the original form and what the recension. Hence, is the paleo-Hebrew Tetragrammaton secondary – a part of the recension – or proof of the Old Greek text? This debate has not yet been solved." She then mentions the 4Q120 manuscript, which has ΙΑΩ as the name of God, and adds that in the Greek Minor Prophets Scroll God is at one point labeled παντοκράτωρ. She mentions also Greek manuscripts with the tetragrammaton in square Aramaic script, the paleo-Hebrew abbreviation 𐤉𐤉, κύριος, θεός, and concludes that "it suffices to say that in old Hebrew and Greek witnesses, God has many names [...] Finally, before Kurios became a standard rendering Adonai, the Name of God was rendered with Theos."

In view of the conflicting opinions of scholars, the question of how the Septuagint originally represented the Tetragrammaton (יהוה? ιαω? or κύριος?) is of doubtful relevance in relation to what was in the copies in use in the second half of the first century CE, when the New Testament texts were first composed. Frank Shaw, taking as his starting point the Septuagint manuscript 4Q120, which renders the name of the Israelite God not by κύριος or ΠΙΠΙ or 𐤉𐤅𐤄𐤅, but by the word Ιαώ, rejects the arguments put forward in support of the various proposals: "The matter of any (especially single) 'original' form of the divine name in the LXX is too complex, the evidence is too scattered and indefinite, and the various approaches offered for the issue are too simplistic" (p. 158). He rejects not only the arguments for an original κύριος put forward by Pietersma, Rösel and Perkins and the idea that the tetragrammaton was put in its place for the sake of making the Greek text conform more closely to the Hebrew. but all others, and holds that "there was no one 'original' form but different translators had different feelings, theological beliefs, motivations, and practices when it came to their handling of the name". There was, he says, "considerable choice among ancient Jews and early Christians regarding how to refer to God".

As Wilkinson comments, that question has even less relevance to what the New Testament writers wrote, rather than read.

=== Old Testament quotations in the New Testament ===
Quotations from the Hebrew Bible in the New Testament are generally taken from the Septuagint and in all extant New Testament manuscripts mostly use the Greek word κύριος ("Lord"), rarely the Greek word θεός ("God"), never the Tetragrammaton itself or a transcription such as ιαω. For example, Luke 4:17 uses κύριος when recounting how Jesus read Isaiah 61:1–2 from the Isaiah scroll at the synagogue in Nazareth.

In 1984, Albert Pietersma stated with regard to non-biblical sources: "When we put aside the biblical MSS and look for literary sources which may enlighten us on whether kyrios was a surrogate for the tetragram, we might possibly appeal to such books as Wisdom of Solomon, 2 Maccabees, 3 Maccabees, et al., all of which use kyrios as a divine epithet (or name?) extensively. But since there is no sure proof that kyrios in these works is a substitute for the tetragram, we had better not draw on them. Similarly, we might appeal to Aristeas 155 which contains a near quotation of Deut 7:18, and Aristobulus who seems to make reference to Exod 9:3; but since these authors were transmitted by Christians, kyrios could be secondary."

In what in May 2019 Larry W. Hurtado called "the most recent and most detailed study" on the biblical sources, Anthony R. Meyer states in relation to Greek biblical manuscripts: "While ιαω and the Hebrew Tetragrammaton are clearly attested in Greek biblical texts, absent from all Second Temple copies is the title κυριος as a replacement for the Hebrew Tetragrammaton. κυριος is the standard title for God in the major Christian codices of the fourth and fifth centuries CE Vaticanus, Sinaiticus, and Alexandrinus [...] this practice enters the extant record in the second century CE, and from that point on, Christian copies of Greek biblical texts invariably use the term κύριος where the underlying Hebrew text reads the Tetragrammaton." A. R. Meyer's study centers on Greek biblical manuscripts and Jewish-Greek literature from "Hellenistic and early Roman periods, including Jewish-Hellenistic poets, historians, apologists, Philo, New Testament writings, and many works known today as Pseudepigrapha," and additionally in his work it reads that "the Greek copies of these works date on paleographic grounds much later than the Second Temple period. As such, they do not offer a direct window into Jewish divine name practices from earlier times." A. R. Meyer claim: "overall, the extant Second Temple Greek biblical manuscripts show the avoidance of the divine name in speech, but not in writing, the latter continued well into the first century CE, until Christian scribes largely took over the transmission of Jewish Greek biblical texts and worked to standardize terms for God with κύριος in the nomina sacra, a convention which seems to have been in force since earliest Christian transmission. Yet, it is improbable that κύριος entered Greek biblical manuscripts only in the first century CE. Apart from the widely held view that κύριος was used in reading Greek biblical texts that show evidence for avoiding the Tetragrammaton, Jewish religious uses of κύριος, as indicated by epigraphic and literary sources that are implausible to explain as the result of later Christian scribal habits—Greek additions to Esther, 2–3 Macc, Ach 70 and 71, 4Q126 (?), P. Fouad 203, and others—show that Jews began using κύριος in writing around the second century BCE." Accordingly, he writes that "the Septuagint manuscripts of the first century CE, which Philo and NT authors rely on for their quotations, could well have contained κύριος, but this does necessarily require that κύριος goes back to the Old Greek translation."; and states: "In summary of the use and non-use of κύριος, the available epigraphic and literary evidence suggests that Jews began using κύριος in writing approximately during the second and first centuries BCE, but such uses are not uniform or standard. At both ends there are writers for whom κύριος was not significant: the Jewish-Hellenistic authors of the early second century BCE and Josephus and 4 Macc of the late first century CE. But among these, other writers use κύριος, including the Greek additions earlier works (Esther, A–F), original Jewish-Greek compositions (2 Macc), and also epigraphic sources (Ach 70 and Ach 71). Further evidence may be adduced from 4Q126, if the reading is accurate, and the apotropaic prayer of P. Fouad 203."

=== New Testament treatment of Old Testament quotations ===
In 1871, Robert Baker Girdlestone, who later became principal of Wycliffe Hall, Oxford, wrote:

If [the Septuagint] had retained the word [Jehovah], or had even used one Greek word for Jehovah and another for Adonai, such usage would doubtless have been retained in the discourses and arguments of the N.T. Thus our Lord in quoting the 110th Psalm, [...] might have said "Jehovah said unto Adoni."

Supposing a Christian scholar were engaged in translating the Greek Testament into Hebrew, he would have to consider, each time the word Κύριος occurred, whether there was anything in the context to indicate its true Hebrew representative; and this is the difficulty which would arise in translating the N. T. into all languages if the title Jehovah had been allowed to stand in the O. T. The Hebrew Scriptures would be a guide in many passages: thus, wherever the expression 'the angel of the Lord' occurs, we know that the word Lord represents Jehovah; a similar conclusion as to the expression 'the word of the Lord' would be arrived at, if the precedent set by the O. T. were followed: so also in the case of the title 'the Lord of Hosts.' Wherever, on the contrary, the expression 'My Lord' or 'Our Lord' occurs, we should know that the word Jehovah would be inadmissible, and Adonai or Adoni would have to be used. But many passages would remain for which no rules could be framed.

It is to be noticed, in connection with this subject, that there are several passages in the O.T. referring to Jehovah which are adopted in the N.T. as fulfilled in the Lord Jesus Christ. Thus, in Joel 2.32, we read, 'Whosoever shall call on the name of Jehovah shall be saved'; but these words are applied to Jesus Christ in Rom. 10.13. St John (chap. 12.41), after quoting a certain passage from Isaiah, which there refers to Jehovah, affirms that it was a vision of the Glory of Christ (see Isa. 6.9,10). In Isa. 4.3, the preparation of the way of Jehovah is spoken of, but John the Baptist adopts it as referring to the preparation of the way of the Messiah. In Mal. 3.1, there seems to be a very important identification of Jehovah with the Messiah, for we read, 'Jehovah, whom ye (profess to) seek, shall suddenly come to his temple, even the angel of the covenant whom ye (profess to) delight in.' In Rom. 9.33, and in 1 Pet. 2.6−8, Christ is described as 'a stone of stumbling and a rock of offence', titles which appear to be given to Jehovah in Isa. 8.13,14. Again in Isa. 45.23−25, Jehovah says, 'Unto me every knee shall bow ... in Jehovah shall all the seed of Israel be justified'. But in Phil. 2.3, we read that God 'hath highly exalted Christ Jesus, and hath given him the name which is above every name, that in the name of Jesus every knee should bow, and every tongue confess that Jesus Christ is LORD (surely Jehovah), to the glory of God the Father'.

Five of the oldest fragmentary manuscripts of the Septuagint discovered since Girdlestone's time have in place of the Κύριος of later manuscripts either the name ΙΑΩ or the tetragrammaton itself in Hebrew/Aramaic or Paleo-Hebrew script, but do not affect his statement about how the New Testament writers understood the Septuagint texts that they were familiar with and that they quoted.

Girdlestone's indication of how the New Testament writers did interpret certain Septuagint references to what in the Hebrew text appears as יהוה is repeated in the 21st century in, for instance, the introduction to Beale and Carson's Commentary on the New Testament Use of the Old Testament:

[I]t is very common for NT writers to apply an OT passage that refers to YHWH (commonly rendered "LORD" in English Bibles) to Jesus. This arises from the theological conviction that it is entirely appropriate to do so since, granted Jesus' identity, what is predicated of God can be predicated no less of him. In other passages, however, God sends the Messiah or the Davidic king, and Jesus himself is that Davidic king, thus establishing a distinction between God and Jesus. The subtleties of these diverse usages of OT texts meld with the complexities of NT Christology to constitute the essential building blocks of what would in time come to be called the doctrine of the Trinity.

An example often remarked on of a New Testament writer's application to Jesus of an Old Testament passage concerning the God of Israel is the use in Hebrews 1:10 of Psalm 102:25. And in placing the double vocative κύριε κύριε (corresponding to אדני יהוה) as a self-designation in the mouth of Jesus, Matthew and Luke have been seen as representing even Jesus as applying the name of the God of Israel to himself. This double vocative appears 18 times in the Septuagint, four times in the New Testament, once in Philo and six times in the Pseudepigrapha.

=== Shaw's Ιαω modification ===
In his 2014 book The Earliest Non-Mystical Jewish Use of Ιαω, Frank Shaw put forward, as he himself wrote, "a modification of George Howard's thesis that tetragrams were present in certain New Testament autographs", viz. "the notion that some books of the New Testament may have had original instances of Ιαω in them and such variants [as those between deum and dominum in James 3:9] are the remnants of proto-orthodox copyists replacing Ιαω with standard substitutes found within Judaism".

Tentative agreement with the possibility ("may have had") that Shaw envisages is expressed by Pavlos D. Vasileiadis: "There is compelling evidence, both explicit and implicit, that some of the Greek Bible copies—like the ones read by Christians such as Irenaeus of Lyons, Origen, Eusebius of Caesarea, Tertullian, Jerome, and Ps-John Chrysostom—were employing the use of Ιαω for the Tetragram. If this conclusion is valid, this would imply that for a few centuries Ιαω was prevailingly present within the Bible copies read by the dispersed Christian communities, side-by-side with Hebrew Tetragrammata and the increasingly dominant scribal device of nomina sacra. As a result, a possible consequence is that Ιαω (or, less possibly, a similar Greek term) might well have appeared in the original NT copies".

=== Further observations on the Howard hypothesis ===
According to Didier Fontaine, no specialist has provided a satisfactory (written) solution to the variants reported by Howard. As a background here one might seemingly advance the idea that the Christological controversies are behind these variants – which seems satisfactory at first, but Shaw points out some latent problems. In an astounding way, great specialists in textual criticism like Metzger and Ehrman do not directly address the thesis of Howard on the variants, which is readily described as "highly speculative." (Osburn). Those who have endorsed Howard's thesis often quote Romans 10:13 as an emblematic case; but Howard has not quoted this verse in his study: one cannot suspect his thesis on this ground. Shaw cites certain scholars who understand this passage, and the quotation of Joel, as referring to the Father.

Albert Pietersma studied the Pentateuch, proposed an original Kurios in the LXX, and states:

If correct, Howard's theory could produce interesting results for students of early Christianity, but as will be argued below, the foundation on which it has been built, namely, the ancient LXX, will not sustain it, though it might possibly still be debated whether perhaps the Palestinian copies with which the NT authors were familiar read some form of the tetragram.

Georg Strecker states that "the fact that in the Septuagint texts that were written by Jews for Jews and presumably were intended for use in worship, the Tetragrammaton יהוה was not translated but reproduced in the Hebrew letters. Accordingly, the translation of the Tetragrammaton with "Kyrios" cannot be presupposed as a general practice for the Pauline period. However Paul does cite LXX texts in which the Tetragrammaton is rendered with Kyrios.

D. Fontaine claims that "Indeed, it is particularly important to discredit the original presence of the tetragrammaton in the Septuagint (whatever its form may have been) because it is the starting point of G. Howard's thesis. It is therefore not surprising that from the beginning of the study, Pietersma is attacking Howard." D. Fontaine citing The Earliest Non-Mystical Jewish Use of Ιαω wrote about A. Pietersma that "[Frank] Shaw reports: "his arguments are quite often sprinkled with provisos such as 'presumably' (94, 96), 'evidently' (96), 'in our view', 'at times' and 'it would seem' (98). To the critical reader all this hardly inspires any real notion of 'proof'" (141). D. Fontaine also wrote that "Shaw begins to address the most crucial topics. He thus attacks the thesis of Pietersma (134–149) and shows that it is not sustainable". D. Fontaine also states:

[Frank] Shaw investigates the problem of dictation among NT [New Testament] writers, Paul, for example: did he dictate from the text of the LXX while using a substitute when he read the Name? Would one have sought out the manuscript in order to quote it exactly? (177) Shaw provides no answer: however, is clear from 1QIsaa (-II) this type of pro-cedure is not unknown – and above all it does not prevent the tetragram from appearing! For example, in Is. 3.17 אדני is put for יהוה, and in the same verse, יהוה is put for אדני . This proves that an amanuensis could very well have heard the qeré "Lord" and decided that, according to the context, whether he had to write אדני or יהוה . In the case of a Christian amanuensis, nothing forbids thinking of an identical process: while hearing the qeré κύριος, "Lord", the scribe could have decided according to the context to write the tetragram or not. Incidentally, this could account for the variants which Howard highlights… Furthermore, the hypothesis of a Hebrazing recension would not be an obstacle for this scenario: the Christian authors were quite able to turn to these types of "more exact" manuscripts, and we know that they existed at their time (cf. 179).

Emanuel Tov affirmed: "in some book of the New Testament and in early Christian literature, Hebraizing revisions of the OG often were quoted rather than the OG version itself, reflecting the beginning of the decline of the LXX (the OG) in Judaism. According to Tuukka Kauhanen, the authors of the New Testament could to know a kaige type Septuagint text. Some scholars have exposed different views to explain why in citation of Zechariah 12:10 in John 19:37 "with known forms of the text reveals that it demonstrates many similarities with the Hebrew Masoretic text", which includes Martin Hengel, who "speak of possibly identifying John's citation with... 8HevXII gr. Tov also wrote that D. A. Koch has shown that in his letters, Paul sometimes "refers to recensions of the Old Greek towards a proto-Masoretic text."

Paul E. Kahle, whose theory of a multiple origin of the Septuagint is rejected by Frank Moore Cross and H. H. Rowley and by Anneli Aejmelaeus, said: "We now know that the Greek Bible text did not as far as it was written did not translate the Divine Name by ky'rios, but the Tetragrammaton written with Hebrew or Greek letters was retained in such MSS", but later Christians replaced the tetragrammaton by Kyrios. D. Fontaine said that in scholarship it is not widely accepted the Paul E. Kahle's affirmation, unlike F. Shaw, and in the world scholarship there are "remnants of Baudissin at work." D. Fontaine also wrote that "Pietersma's thesis is still quite popular. But it could be an illusion. What is sure is that Shaw's thesis will contribute to change things" and "naturally, via Pietersma's views. Such a prolific scholar as L. Hurtado seems to agree with Pietersma and Rösel's views, by willingly quoting them with approval."

D. Fontaine claims that "to the question of the kyrios/theos variants reported by G. Howard (which would be perfectly explained in the context of the initial presence of the tetragrammaton in the NT), L. Hurtado answers: "Well, maybe so. But his theory doesn't take adequate account of all the data, including the data that "kyrios" was used as a/the vocal substitute for YHWH among Greek-speaking Jews. There's no indication that the Hebrew YHWH ever appeared in any NT text." Then D. Fontaine objects that: "Even if kyrios was used orally by the Hellenic-speaking Jews (which is very far from being acquired, see Shaw 2002), the written practice might be different" and he adds that "what is annoying is that Pietersma supports a thesis that not only has no textual proof, but is mostly overturned by textual evidence." P. D. Vasileiadis gives an answer that L. Hurtado calls his "(final?) reiteration": "it is hard to believe that more than 4 centuries of manuscripts extant today would have not included even a trace of the "Kyrios" use in the Greek Bible/LXX copies [...] That is, if the rabbinical practice of using (or better, writing) "Kyrios" (as rendering of the Tetragrammaton) into the Bible text of the Greek-speaking Judaism was the pre-Christian mainstream practice we should have at least a sample of it. But this is not the case up to today. So, despite the hardly attempt to convince the audience for the rightness of Pietersma's proposal and overturn the "scholarly consensus" and "the prevailing assumption" "that the original translators of the LXX never rendered the divine name with Kyrios, but kept the tetragrammaton in Hebrew or Palaeo-Hebrew characters, or that they used the transcription IAO" (Rösel 2007: 416), I think that Pietersma's proposal is not convincing. The hard (manuscript) evidence does not support this well-built theory. Moreover, it seems that more and more researchers admit that the "Jewish practice of never pronouncing the name as it is written" was not as widespread as it has been believed to be until recently. It is probable that despite the fact that the Temple/priestly intelligentsia might refrain or even forbade pronouncing the Tetragrammaton, at least the knowledge of the correct pronunciation of God's name (as was heard at least by the high priest until 70 CE) and respectively its utterance was common practice until at least the 1st century CE. The widespread use of the form IAO is supporting this view.

In an article that according to D. Fontaine, P. D. Vasileiadis "carefully examines the different perspectives", P. D. Vasileiadis affirm that "a most obvious reason for the wide repetition of Pietersma's position is exactly because it provides a facile solution that supports the centuries-long held traditional thesis that κύριος originality rendered the Tetragrammaton within the original Greek NT. However, as G. Howard argued, this scenario does not satisfactorily explain the subsequent Christological implications of the NT textual variants and the long and bloodstained theological disputes provoked. [...] Pietersma tried to revive the core of Baudissin's thesis, that is, that "the LXX had rendered the divine name as kurios right from the beginning" but "today, however, Baudissin's view is generally discarded." [...] Regarding the sequence in which Ιαω appeared, M. Rösel concluded: "I would speculate that the strange reading of ΙΑΩ is a secondary replacement that comes from a community (in Egypt?) that still pronounced the name of God in this way." [...] But the question remains: If there were a 'community in Egypt that still pronounced the name of God' during the first century BCE and the first century CE, why might there not have been such a community two centuries earlier when the LXX Torah was written down?.

Along with Howard, Rolf Furuli suggested that the tetragrammaton may have been removed from the Greek manuscripts. Regarding nomina sacra, R. Furuli wrote "we cannot deny that these abbreviations show that a tampering with the NT text has occurred because the abbreviations cannot be original…. We have a corrupt text! Mark A. House avouched: "there is little basis for this argument" but then states: "It is true that we do not possess the autographs (originals) of any New Testament document, and that the copies we do possess show some evidence of error on the part of the copyists. However, we simply do not know whether or not the original writers may have abbreviated the word kurios as the copyists have done. Whether they did so or not, it seems clear that there would have been no question among early readers that KS consistently represented the word kurios, and thus the abbreviation can hardly be said to represent a textual corruption that leaves the reader's mind in doubt as to the original wording.

David Trobisch proposes that YHWH survived in the manuscripts until c. 150, when the biblical canon was compiled. Jason T. Larson asseverates that D. Trobisch "notes that there are a more or less uniform number of words that usually appear in the manuscripts as nomina sacra in contracted form. All of the textual witnesses display the same system of notation, and Trobisch suggests that these forms were present from the beginning of the editorial process. However, while the notation is consistent, there is a problem with the application of the system: there are a number of instances where a nomen sacrum is contracted at one place in a manuscript, whereas in other locations it is not (12). Finally, while there is a uniform list of terms that can be designated as nomina sacra, it is highly significant that only θεος, κυριος, Ἰησοῦς, and Χριστός are consistently and regularly noted as nomina sacra in virtually all extant New Testament manuscripts. The upshot is that since the notation of nomina sacra does not appear to have originated with authors of the autograph texts, their presence reflects "a conscious editorial decision made by a specific publisher"."

Lloyd Gaston suggest that Howard's thesis is "a very important discovery that has been strangely neglected in New Testament studies". P. D. Vasileiadis informs that L. Gaston affirms that "G. Howard points out that in none of the now considerable LXX texts from the first century is kyrios used for the tetragrammaton, which is written in Hebrew letters. He concludes that the use of kyrios was begun by Christian scribes in the second century, who applied it also to New Testament texts. This means that Old Testament citations in New Testament manuscripts originally contained the tetragrammaton. It will be seen that this makes a considerable difference in the interpretation of many texts", and that "F. Shaw proposed that the Greek form Ιαω 'would more likely have been the familiar form understood by the earliest Christians and by those to whom they preached' as far as it was "a word in Greekscript that existed in the Greek-speaking world of the early Christians", 'a form familiar to gentiles.'"

The Jewish custom of writing the tetragrammaton in Hebrew characters within the Greek text continued in the first centuries CE. In the book Archaeology and the New Testament, John McRay wrote that: "another fact worth noting is that as late as the third century some scribes who copied the Greek manuscripts did not use the Greek word κυριος for the Tetragram, but transcribed the Aramaic characteres יהוה (Yahweh) into Greek as ΠΙΠΙ (PIPI)" and referring to the New Testament autographs, he wrote: "this whole issue becomes even more intriguin when we consider the possibility that the New Testament autographs, written almost entirely by Jewish Christians (the possible exception being Luke–Acts), may have preserved the Jewish custom and retained the divine name in Aramaic scripts in quotations from the Old Testament. Thus they may have followed the lead of some Jewish author who used one scripts for the divine name when they quoted scripture and another when they themselves referred to God. Similarly, it was customary at Qumran to use the Tetragram freely when one was either copying or intruducing Scripture quotations into a commentary, but to use El ("God") in original material written for a commentary."

The autograph New Testament manuscripts were lost, and it is widely accepted that were from Jewish origin, (i.e. Richard Bauckham, and Mark Allan Powell,). The oldest known 𝔓^{52} is a Christian manuscript, and it is assumed that nomina sacra were absent. Robert Shedinger quoting Howard and internal evidence of the Diatessaron, gives θεος as an intermediate change before κυριος in the New Testament Greek copies, like Kristin De Troyer proposed it in the Old Testament.

Before G. Howard's thesis Gerard Mussies postulated an original tetragram in form of tetrapuncta in Revelations 1:4, due, among other reasons, to this verse containing the words ὁ ὤν. D. Fontaine avers that F. Shaw "points to other instances in Revelation that could support the G. Mussies position (Rev 1.8, 4.8, 2.13)."

The manuscripts of the Septuagint and other Greek translations of the Hebrew Bible that are pre-Christian or contemporary to the Apostolic Age present the tetragrammaton in Hebrew within the Greek text or use the Greek transliteration ΙΑΩ (4Q120), which, according to Wilkinson, may have been the original practice before a Hebraicizing tendency set in. Even post-New Testamentary Septuagint manuscript LXX^{P.Oxy.VII.1007} that contains a double yodh to represent the name of God, and P. Oxy. LXXVII 5101 dated from 50 CE to 150 CE that has tetragrammaton, both from a post-historical Jesus period, like other Greek translations made in the 2nd century by Aquila, Symmachus and Theodotion, and other anonymous translations contained in the Hexapla (Quinta, Sextus and Septima).

Pavlos D. Vasileiadis, does not agree with the point of view of an original κύριος instead of tetragrammaton in the Alexandrian Bible, and related to the New Testament in the work Aspects to Rendering the Sacred Tetragrammaton in Greek he assured: "Did Jesus, his early movement, and consequently the NT authors follow this practice? During the last decades this question comes again increasingly frequently in the research foreground. The answer is not as obvious as it may seem." Then P. D. Vasileiadis cites some of his previous works to support his establishment, and then cites to other previous arguments by other scholars:

Concerning the oral use of the divine name by early Christians, McDonough notes that "Jewish Christians could possibly have used the name YHWH when (and if) they spoke Hebrew" (YHWH at Patmos, 98). Regarding the early text of the Christian Scriptures, Howard supported the thesis that the original texts of the New Testament preserved the Tetragrammaton (either in Hebrew scripts or in a Greek transliteration) in citations and allusions of the OT (Howard, "The Tetragram"; idem, "The Name of God"; idem, "Tetragrammaton"). Shedinger proposed that the Syriac Diatessaron, composed some time after the middle of the second century C.E., may provide additional confirmation of Howard's hypothesis (Tatian and the Jewish Scriptures, 136–140). Additionally, within the Syriac Peshitta is discernible the distinction between κύριος rendered as ܐܳܪܝܳܡ (marya, which means "lord" and refers to the God as signified by the Tetragrammaton; see Lu 1:32) and ܢܰܪܳܡ (maran, a more generic term for "lord"; see Joh 21:7).

Pavlos D. Vasileiadis continues and cites to Muraoka, A Greek-Hebrew Aramaic Two-way Index to the Septuagint (72), and believes that kurios cannot be a synonym for YHWH: "Bearing in mind that κύριος in the late LXX copies is used to render more than twenty corresponding Hebrew (HB) terms or term combinations of the HB, in a similar manner the term κύριος does comprise richer information in the Greek NT." P. D. Vasileiadis and Nehemia Gordon in 2019 establish:

On the conceptual level, while some maintain that Jesus and his disciples observed the proscription against speaking the Tetragrammaton, others have concluded that "it is possible that in oral speech Jesus and the disciples vocalized the divine name." Some have gone as far as to suggest that 'Jesus did not know the Jewish fear of pronouncing God's name.

On the textual level, the Tetragrammaton has not been found in any surviving Greek manuscripts of the New Testament. Does this mean that the Christian authors opted to use terms like θεος and κυριος to translate the Tetragrammaton? For the time being we cannot give a definitive answer. As discussed above, it seems improbable that the Tetragrammaton-to-κυριος convention—as a kind of Septuagintalism—existed when the New Testament texts were authored. The earliest surviving copies of the New Testament use the nomina sacra, a scribal convention for rendering terms like God and Lord, that expanded rapidly and widely along with the rapid increase of Christian Bible copying. But it becomes obvious from the parallel development of the Old Greek/Septuagint tradition that this practice first appears only in the second century CE and without following a strictly uniform pattern.

Although the support for the use of the Tetragrammaton in Greek New Testament manuscripts is lacking, it is often possible to identify where κυριος reflects the Tetragrammaton in contrast to where it reflects Hebrew terms such as adoni used of mortal men and angels. Several scholars have attempted this undertaking..., with the result being an average of 64.4 instances of the Tetragrammaton in the Gospels.

R. Kendal Soulen in a review of Robert J. Wilkinson suggests that:

Contrary to what was commonly supposed as recently as a generation ago, the Tetragrammaton remains comparably important in the New Testament—if anything, it becomes more important still. It occupies a central place in the piety of Jesus... the fact that whereas the Tetragrammaton routinely appears in Jewish biblical texts, in both Hebrew and Greek, it virtually never appears in biblical texts of Christian origin, being represented instead by... the distinctively Christian abbreviation ΚΣ. The implications of "eclipse" notwithstanding, however, the author makes the important point that this shift in scribal convention does not signal a lack of Christian interest in the Tetragrammaton. Though the divine name may be physically absent in New Testament texts, yet "its presence can be detected indirectly", inasmuch as the New Testament writers often allude to it obliquely in formulating their convictions about God, Christ, and the Holy Spirit.

Extant New Testament manuscripts are from the late Ante-Nicene Period rather than the Apostolic Age. R. J. Wilkinson wrote that there are authors who "wish to promote or prohibit a devotional or liturgical use of the Tetragrammaton or hold strong views about its pronunciation and meaning" and in a footnote he cites D. Fontaine and P. D. Vasileiadis. R. J. Wilkinson declared that D. Fontaine follows the belief that he "regards the eclipse of the name as a part of a Satanic strategy and [the belief]... that Tetragrammaton appear in early New Testament texts", and "consider that Christian apostasy from the practice and teaching of the original disciples led to hostilly to the Tetragrammaton and its removal to the New Testament." P. D. Vasileiadis avouched that: "Following a similar procedure with the Greek copies of the Hebrew Scriptures, it is probable that the insertion of kyrios into the Greek text of the Christian Scriptures in places where the Tetragrammaton originally might have stood was a matter of time".

George Howard has suggested that the tetragrammaton appeared in the original New Testament autographs, and that "the removal of the Tetragrammaton from the New Testament and its replacement with the surrogates κυριος and θεος blurred the original distinction between the Lord God and the Lord Christ." In the Anchor Bible Dictionary, edited by David Noel Freedman, Howard states: "There is some evidence that the Tetragrammaton, the Divine Name, Yahweh, appeared in some or all of the [Old Testament] OT quotations in the NT when the NT documents were first penned."

Wolfgang Feneberg comments in the Jesuit magazine Entschluss/Offen (April 1985): "He [Jesus] did not withhold his father's name YHWH from us, but he entrusted us with it. It is otherwise inexplicable why the first petition of the Lord's Prayer should read: 'May your name be sanctified!'". He also says that, "in pre-Christian manuscripts for Greek-speaking Jews, God's name was not paraphrased with kýrios [Lord], but was written in the tetragram form in Hebrew or archaic Hebrew characters. ... We find recollections of the name in the writings of the Church Fathers; but they are not interested in it. By translating this name kýrios (Lord), the Church Fathers were more interested in attributing the grandeur of the kýrios to Jesus Christ."

Mogen Müller says that no Jewish manuscript of the Septuagint has been found with κύριος representing the tetragrammaton, and it has been argued that the use of Κύριος shows that later copies of the Septuagint were of Christian character; but other Jewish writings of the time show that Greek-speaking Jews did in fact use κύριος for Yahweh and it was because the Septuagint, before the later Hebraizing Tetragram was inserted, spoke of Yahweh as κύριος that what it said of Yahweh κύριος could be transferred to κύριος Jesus.

The consistent use of Κύριος to represent the tetragrammaton has been called "a distinguishing mark for any Christian LXX manuscript", Alan Mugridge states regarding Papyrus Oxyrhynchus 1007 and Papyrus Oxyrhynchus 656:

It has been suggested that two OT papyri, listed here as Christian, are actually Jewish. In 3 [ie, P. Oxy. VII 1007] (2nd half III AD) two yodhs (...) appear for the Divine Name. A second hand wrote the Divine Name as κυριος with a different 'pen' from the rest of the text in 9 [ie, P. Oxy. IV 656] (II/III AD), perhaps a second writer assigned to insert the Divine Name. This is not sufficient reason, however, to conclude that these two papyri are Jewish, since Jewish strands within early Christianity existed throughout the period under review, as we noted earlier. Hence, this practice may just reflect current practice in Jewish-Christian groups, which did not fade away as early or as completely as is often thought. (...) If 3 [ie, P. Oxy. VII 1007] is a Christian papyrus – and the use of the nomen sacrum θς would seem to support this – it is the only example of an attempt to write something resembling Hebrew characters in a Christian manuscript.

A. Mugridge also offers a point of view in which some assume that "the Early Christians had their text reproduced 'in house,' making little or no use of 'secular' 'professional' scribes" – that is, they had their works copied using whatever pool of writing ability lay within their own ranks, mostly of a non-professional nature" and then cites Bruce M. Metzger who wrote in relation to the NT: "In the earlier ages of the Church, Biblical manuscripts were reproduced by individual christians". A. Murgridge also cites to Kurt and Barbara Aland who "maintained that the copying of manuscripts of Christian works must have been done 'privately by individuals in the early period" and adds that there is also the possibility that professional writers have converted to Christians and produced in-house early Christian codices.

According to Edmon Gallagher, some Christian scribes "would have produced a paleo-Hebrew Tetragrammaton", concluding that "if the scribe copied poorly the paleo-Hebrew script... as πιπι, which can be a corruption only of the Tetragrammaton in square script."

Jerome wrote that by 384 CE, some ignorant readers of the LXX assumed the tetragrammaton to be a Greek word, πιπι (pipi), suggesting its pronunciation had been forgotten, but affirming its existence at the end of the 4th century. Robert J. Wilkinson suggests that Jews in mixed communities would not tolerate articulations of the tetragrammaton, and that gentiles would have trouble pronouncing it if it were not ΙΑΩ or Κύριος. Some Jews may have continued to pronounce YHWH in one form or another, (e.g., ιαω in Greek) until the late Second Temple Period. According to Pavlos Vasileiadis, "The indications denote that it was 'still being pronounced by some Hellenistic Jews' and also by non-Jews as late as the third century C.E.

Sidney Jellicoe wrote that "the evidence most recently to hand is tending to confirm the testimony of Origen and Jerome, and that Kahle is right in holding that LXX texts, written by Jews for Jews, retained the divine name in Hebrew Letters (paleo-Hebrew or Aramaic) or in the Greek-letters imitative form ΠΙΠΙ, and that its replacement by Κύριος was a Christian innovation". Jellicoe cites various scholars (B. J. Roberts, Baudissin, Kahle and C. H. Roberts) and various segments of the Septuagint concluding that the absence of Adonai from the text suggests that the insertion of the term Κύριος was a later practice; that the Septuagint Κύριος is used to substitute YHWH; and that the tetragrammaton appeared in the original text, but Christian copyists removed it.

==== Diatessaron ====
Ulrich B. Schmid states that "Tatian composed his armony of the canonical Gospels in Greek probably in the 60s or 70s of the second century" and use the "Gospels in the form that they had at that time". U. B. Schmid claims: "in raw of chronological terms, the Diatessaron antedates virtually all the MSS of NT. Consequently the Diatessaron is of fundamental importance for the study of the text of the Gospels and for the study of the evolution of the Gospel tradition." R. F. Shedinger suggested that "Tatian preserves authentic early Gospel readings which have all disappeared from Greek manuscripts tradition, but survive in a few versional and patristic writings." Tatian's Diatessaron shows some variance in applying Κύριος to YHWH, but this may be because of dependence on the Peshitta. R. F. Shedinger asserted it must be asked if "it is possible that in the middle of the second century, Tatian had Gospels texts which consistently read "God" in Old Testament citations where the Hebrew text being cited had the Tetragrammaton, and the LXX read Κύριος?" Due to variants in the titles "Lord" and "God" even in the Greek manuscripts, Robert Shedinger wrote that in the Greek New Testament copies after originals it could have been changed יהוה by θεος, and later by Κύριος, and Diatessaron may provide additional confirmation of Howard's hypothesis:

It is at least possible that the regular use of "God" in the Diatessaron is further confirmation of Howard's thesis. However, it must be stressed that Howard's thesis is somewhat speculative, and the textual evidence he cites from the New Testament in support of it is far from overwhelming. But if Howard is wrong, and Κύριος was the original reading of the New Testament, some other plausible explanation must be found for the use of "God" in both the Diatessaron and the other textual and patristic witnesses cited above that for the most part have no connection to the Diatessaron tradition. If nothing else, this phenomenon of the regular use of "God" in place of "Lord" in the Diatessaron is further evidence of Tatian's independence of the OTP.

Kyrios appears over 700 times in the New Testament, and in a few instances some Greek manuscripts also use the term in place of Theos. The consistency in rendering YHWH as Κύριος in all New Testament references would be difficult to explain if there were not already either an established tradition to read Κύριος where YHWH appears in a Greek manuscript, or an established body of texts with Κύριος already in the Greek. Κύριος is not an exact synonym of the Hebrew Tetragrammaton.

== Howard's other hypothesis ==
Shem Tob's Hebrew Gospel of Matthew, found in a 14th-century Jewish polemical work, employs ה״ (apparently an abbreviation for הַשֵּׁם, Ha-Shem, meaning "The Name"). Referring to the term Ha-Shem (not YHWH) as "the Divine Name", Howard says of this gospel:

The Divine Name occurs in the following situations: (1) In quotations from the Hebrew Bible where the MT contains the Tetragrammaton. (2) In introductions to quotations. For example: 1:22. "All this was to complete what was written by the prophet according to the LORD"; 22:31, "Have you not read concerning the resurrection of the dead that the LORD spoke to you saying." (3) In such phrases as "angel of the LORD" or "house of the LORD": 2:13, "As they were going, behold, the angel of the LORD appeared unto Joseph saying"; 2:19, "It came to pass when King Herod died the angel of the LORD in a dream to Joseph in Egypt"; 21:12, "Then Jesus entered the house of the LORD"; 28:2, "Then the earth was shaken because the angel of the LORD descended from heaven to the tomb, overturned the stone, and stood still."

Didier Fontaine interprets Howard as saying that the term Ha-Shem appeared in the original New Testament and considers interesting that, while Howard's claim that this gospel is really a relatively primitive form of the Gospel of Matthew met with widespread and sometimes "virulent" criticism, there was "complete silence" regarding this idea.

== Possible rabbinical references ==
In rabbinic literature reference is sometimes, but rarely, made to גיליונים (gilyonim). The word is a disputed term and has been interpreted in various ways: most commonly as a reference to Christian gospels.

The uncertainty of the meaning of the term is remarked on by James Carleton Paget: "The association of the term gilyonim with the Gospels has not gone undisputed and the term has also been understood as apocalypses or the margins of biblical scrolls. Identification with the canonical Gospels arises precisely from its linguistic proximity to the term used in b. Šabb 116a-b, where it seems certain that the reference is to something like a Christian Gospel."

In view of the setting of a mention of the term in the Tosefta, Günter Stemberger also considers uncertain the meaning as "gospels": "It has been suggested already long ago that gilyonim is a slightly distorted form of evangelyonim and refers to the gospels. The problem with such an interpretation is that the earliest Christian reference to gospels in the plural are later than the attributions in the context of the Tosefta seem to suggest (first half of the second century). In spite of this difficulty, Steven Katz with many other recent authors identifies the gilyonim as gospels."

In reference to a passage that says gilyonim and books of the minim are not to be saved from fire on the sabbath, Daniel Boyarin writes: "The gilyonim have been interpreted in the past as 'Evangilyon' [εὐαγγέλιον] not least by the Talmudic Rabbis themselves, who variously distorted it into Awen Gilyon and Awon Gilyon, namely, 'gilyon of wretchedness' and 'gilyon of sin', which would suggest that Jewish Christians are the actual object of this passage, and thus has the passage been taken in the scholarly literature, Shlomo Pines [...] has shown, however, that the word is used in Syriac too in the sense of apocalypses. This would be an even more attractive interpretation, and the reference would be to books like Enoch."

On the other side, Yair Furstenberg declares: "The rare term gilyonim stands for a particular group of heretical books, the Gospels (euangelion), and not fragments of parchments as some scholars have interpreted."

The following are translations of the passage of the Tosefta (Shabbat 13:5) that mentions the gilyonim:

- The "Gilyon[im]" and the [Biblical] books of the Judæo-Christians ["Minim"] are not saved [on the Sabbath] from fire; but one lets them burn together with the names of God written upon them."
- The Gilyon[im] (i.e., gospel books) and the books of the minim (i.e., Jewish heretics) are not saved [on the Sabbath] from fire; but one lets them burn together with the names of God [Tetragrammaton ] written upon them.
- The Gospels (gilyonim) and books of the heretics (sifrei minim) are not saved but are left where they are to burn, they and their sacred names.
- The books of the Evangelists and the books of the minim they do not save from a fire [on the Sabbath]. They are allowed to burn up where they are, they and [even] the references to the Divine Name that are in them.
- We do not save from the fire (on the Sabbath) the Gospels (gilyonim) and the books of the minim (heretics). Rather, they are burned in their place, they and their Tetragrammata.

The Jewish Encyclopedia recalls that "the Jewish Christians of Palestine had a Gospel of their own, the so-called Hebrew Gospel, from which still later Church Fathers quote". It states that the correct reading has "Gilyon" in the singular and argues that the text refers specifically to "the Hebrew Gospel", not to other Gospels, of which there were many, including those of the Gnostics. Frederick Fyvie Bruce also says that the gilyonim "were not the canonical Gospels which we are familiar with but documents in Hebrew or Aramaic, bearing some kind of relation to our Gospel of Matthew or to a work later in vogue".

Robert J. Wilkinson says that there seems to be no unambiguous rabbinic testimony to Christians using the Tetragrammaton.

As already mentioned, Paget and Pines hold, against the more common opinion, that the Gilyonim were not Gospels but Apocalypses like the Book of Enoch.

== Some modern adaptations of the New Testament ==
A few modern versions use the Tetragrammaton or equivalents like "Yahweh" or "Jehovah" to replace the words κύριος (Lord) and θεός (God) in the text of the New Testament as it appears in the manuscripts. Some long predate Howard's 1977 hypothesis and so are not linked with it.

135 such adaptations have been listed. The oldest, dating from the 14th century, are translations into Hebrew, and therefore use as the equivalent of κύριος יהוה (the Tetragrammaton) or השם ("The Name") without thereby proposing that the original Greek texts had either of these forms in place of κύριος.

These 135 are a minute proportion of the existing translations of the New Testament, which by 1 October 2019 has been translated into 2246 different languages, in some of which it exists in dozens of distinct translations.

None have been produced by mainstream publishers. Generally, the individual or group that makes such a version publishes it either on the Internet or on paper. Very few have been noted or reviewed by scholars outside the Sacred Name Movement.

Several of the 135 are known as Sacred Name Bibles. In the New Testament, as well as in the Old, they "consistently use Hebraic forms of God's name".

An example is the Holy Name Bible by Angelo B. Traina, whose publishing company, The Scripture Research Association, released the New Testament portion in 1950. On the grounds that the New Testament was originally written not in Greek but in Hebrew, he substituted "Yahweh" for the manuscripts' Κύριος. In place of their Θεός, he sometimes used "Yahweh", sometimes "Elohim".

Instead of a transliteration such as "Yahweh" or "Jehovah", the South Africa-based publishing company "Institute for Scriptural Research" produced in 1993 its The Scriptures, the first to use the Tetragrammaton in its Hebrew letters in the midst of its English text. An adaptation using instead the paleo-Hebrew script was published in 2008 by Urchinsea Designs, Florida under the title, The Besorah.

Others have based their adaptations on the supposition that the New Testament was written not in Greek but in a Semitic language:

- Roth, Andrew Gabriel (2008). The Aramaic English New Testament (Third ed.). Israel: Netzari Press.
- The Hebraic Roots Bible. Word of Truth Publications. 2012.
- The Sacred Scriptures Bethel Edition (1981), which uses "Yahweh".

== See also ==
- Authorship of the Epistle to the Hebrews
- Biblical criticism
- Chronology of the Bible
- Chronology of Jesus
- Dating the New Testament
- Earlier Epistle to the Ephesians
- Historical background of the New Testament
- Historicity of the Bible
- Names of God in Christianity
- Names of God in Judaism
- Novum Testamentum Graece
- Papyrus Fouad 266
- Papyrus Rylands 458
