= Papyrus Oxyrhynchus 3522 =

Greek Septuagint manuscript fragment

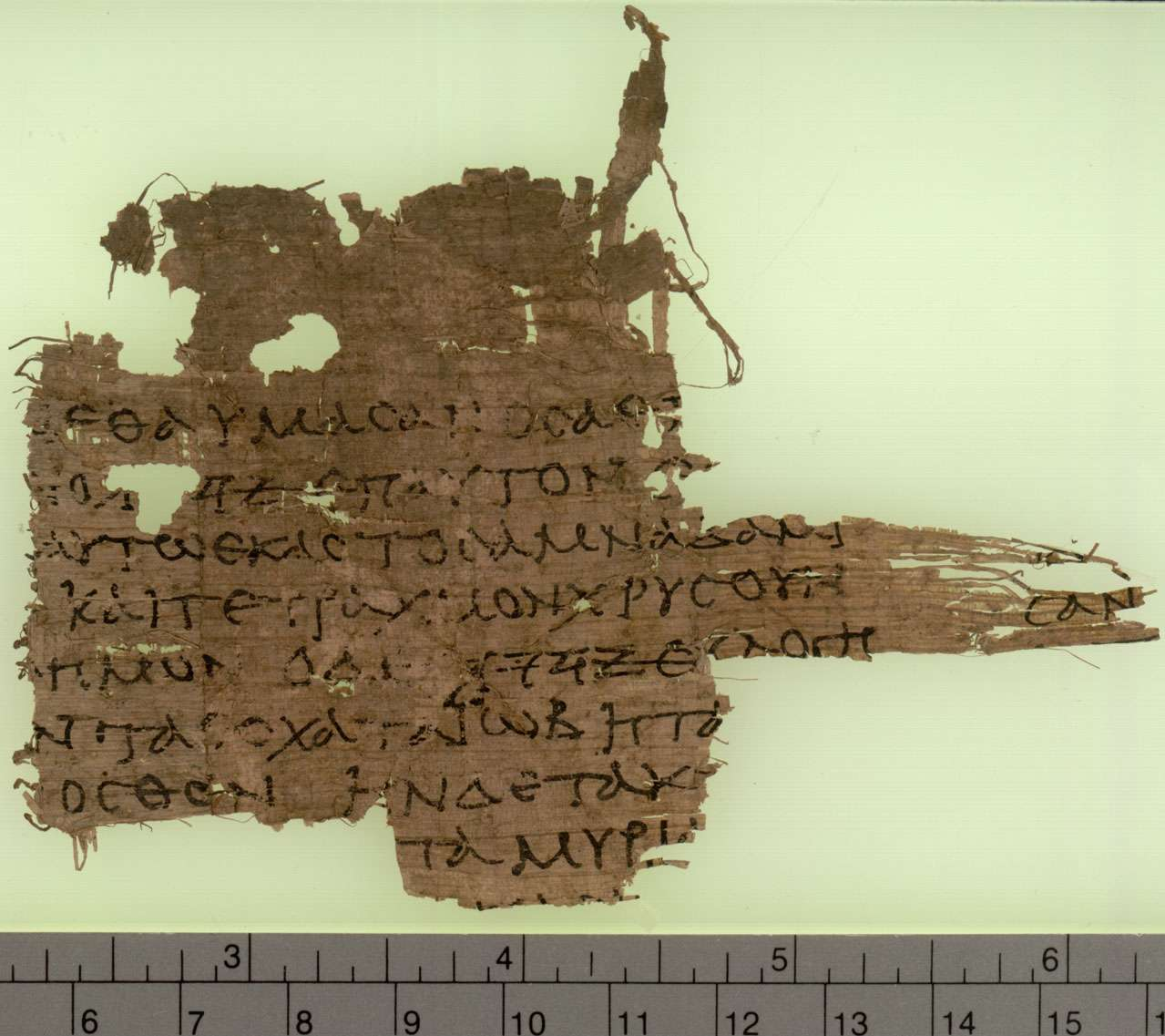
Papyrus LXX Oxyrhynchus 3522

The Papyrus LXX Oxyrhynchus 3522, (signed as P.Oxy.L 3522; Rahlfs 857; LDAB 3079) – is a small fragment of the Greek Septuagint (LXX) written in papyrus, in scroll form. As one of the manuscripts discovered at Oxyrhynchus it has been catalogued with the number 3522. Palaeographically it has been dated to the 1st century CE. The text agrees with the LXX.

== Description ==
This fragment contains Job 42,11-12.

=== Version ===
Peter J. Parsons claim that its text "stands closer to the LXX rather than the literal accurate version of Symmachus."

=== Tetragrammaton ===
This manuscript includes the tetragrammaton (written from right to left) in paleo-Hebrew. Frank E. Shaw states:

With the publication of P.Oxy. 3522, a Jewish scroll fragment containing two verses of Job 42 from the early first century CE, we are in a better position to judge the first of Pietersma's points. According to the MS's editor P. J. Parsons it is not part of any Hebraized recension in spite of the fact that it 'sports' two instances of a paleo-Hebrew tetragram. Evidently, Tov concurs with Parson's assessment. Such a nonHebraized LXX MS that contains paleo-Hebrew tetragrams is a second example of a Handschrift than does not fit Pietersma's paradigm.

=== Text ===
Text according to A. R. Meyer:
κ]αι εθαυμασαν οσα επ[ηγα
γε]ν ο 𐤉𐤄𐤅𐤄 επαυτον εδ[ωκε
δε ]αυτω εκαστος αμναδα μι
αν] και τετραχμον χρυσουν
α]σημον ο δε 𐤉𐤄𐤅𐤄 ευλογη
σ]εν τα εσχατα ϊωβ η τα [εμ
π]ροσθεν ην δε τα κτ[ηνη
αυτου προβα]τα μυρια[ τε

Romanization of Meyer:
k]ai ethaumasan osa ep[ēga
ge]n ho 𐤉𐤄𐤅𐤄 epauton ed[ōke
de ]autō ekastos amnada mi
an] kai tetrachmon chrysoun
a]sēmon ho de 𐤉𐤄𐤅𐤄 eulogē
s]en ta eschata Ïōb hē ta [em
p]rosthen ēn de ta kt[ēnē
autou proba]ta myria[ te

NIV translation:
They comforted and consoled him over all the
trouble the LORD had brought on him,
and each one gave him
a piece of silver and a gold ring.
The LORD blessed
the latter part of Job’s life
more than the former part.
He had [fourteen] thousand sheep…

== History ==
The fragment was published in 1983 by P. J. Parsons in The Oxyrhynchus Papyri, vol. L (50). Also the fragment is catalogued with number 857 in the list of manuscripts of the Septuagint as the classification of Alfred Rahlfs, also as LDAB 3079.

== Location ==
The manuscript is kept in the Papyrology department of the Sackler library in Oxford as (P.Oxy.L 3522): Papyrology Rooms, Art, Archaeology and Ancient World Library, Oxford.

== See also ==
- Papyrus Fouad 266
- Papyrus LXX Oxyrhynchus 1007
- Papyrus LXX Oxyrhynchus 5101

== Bibliography ==
- Parsons, P. J. "P.Oxy.L 3522". Oxyrhynchus Online. The Oxyrhynchus Papyri. Archived from the original on August 12, 2014.
- Parsons, P. J. (1983). 3522. LXX Job 42:11–12. Papyrus Oxyrhynchus. Vol. L. London: Egypt Exploration Society. pp. 1–3.
- Shaw, Frank E. (2014). The Earliest Non-mystical Jewish Use of Iαω. Contributions to Biblical Exegesis and Theology. Vol. 70. Lovaina: Peeters. ISBN 978-90-429-2978-4. OCLC 1044478987.
