= Papyrus Schøyen 2648 =

Papyrus manuscript of Septuagint

The Papyrus Schøyen MS 2648 (also Rahlfs 816, P. Schoyen. 1 23, TM 66869, LDAB 8119) are six leaves of a papyrus codex of the Septuagint that contain the text of Joshua 9:27-11:3 in Koine Greek. It has been dated to the early third century (from about 200/215 CE).

== Description ==
The leaves measure 20 × 11 cm and are inscribed in single columns of 19 to 25 lines each with Alexandrian majuscules. They were probably part of a codex of the Book of Joshua comprising about 72 leaves. The leaves are the oldest surviving evidence of these passages in Greek and represent an older textual variant before Origen's Hexapla. It also differs from the later Masoretic Text.

=== Variants ===
The manuscript does not have verses 15, 17 and 43 of chapter 10 as do other ancient Greek manuscripts that match the Hebrew text.

=== Version ===
Kristin De Troyer states:

The texts of papyrus Schøyen MS 2648 (a Joshua codex) and MS 2649 (a Leviticus codex) belong to the Old Greek text tradition of the books of Joshua and Leviticus. But both codices attest not purely to the Old Greek text, but to an already slightly altered text. The Old Greek text of the two codices was already revised towards a Hebrew text, most often the Masoretic text. The two papyri are thus not witnesses for the Old Greek text as it left the hands of the first translators, but for an Old Greek text that was beginning to be revised towards the Hebrew text.

== History ==
The manuscript probably originated at Oxyrhynchos. It was probably written by the same scribe as Papyrus Schøyen 2649. Around 1930, the leaves were acquired in Alexandria from an antique dealer by a collector from Zurich. In 1998, the Schøyen Collection in Oslo bought them, signature MS 2648. The leaves were in the midst of Papyrus Schøyen 2650.

== Sources ==
- De Troyer, Kristin (2005). "23. LXX, Joshua (MS 2648)". In Pintaudi, Rosario (ed.). Papyri Graecae Schøyen (PSchøyen I). Manuscripts in the Schøyen Collection. V: Greek papyri. Vol I. / Papyrologica Florentina. Vol. 5. Florenz: Edizioni Gonelli. pp. 81–145. ISBN 88-74-68026-0.
- De Troyer, Kristin (2006). "Reconstructing the OG of Joshua". In Kraus, Wolfgang; Wooden, R. Glenn (eds.). Septuagint Research. Issues and Challenges in the Study of the Greek Jewish Scriptures. Septuagint and Cognate Studies. Vol. 53. Atlanta: Society of Biblical Literature. pp. 105–118. ISBN 978-1-58983-204-6.
- De Troyer, Kristin (2011-05-06). "From Leviticus to Joshua: The Old Greek Text in Light of Two Septuagint Manuscripts from the Schøyen Collection". Journal of Ancient Judaism. 2 (1). Brill: 29–78. doi:10.30965/21967954-00201002.
- Rahlfs, Alfred; Fraenkel, Detlef (2003). Verzeichnis der griechischen Handschriften des Alten Testaments. Band I,1: Die Überlieferung bis zum VIII. Jahrhundert. Septuaginta. Vetus Testamentum Graecum. Supplementum. Göttingen: Vandenhoeck & Ruprecht. p. 272.
- "MS 2648". The Schøyen Collection.
- "P.Schøyen 1 23 = Trismegistos 66869 = LDAB 8119". DCLP/Trismegistos.
- "TM 66869 / LDAB 8119". Trismegistos Texts.
- Van Der Meer, Michaël N. (2006). "Provenance, Profile, and Purpose of the Greek Joshua". In Peters, Melvin (ed.). XII Congress of the International Organization for Septuagint and Cognate Studies Leiden, 2004. SBL - Septuagint and Cognate Studies. Vol. 54. BRILL. ISBN 9789047409557.
