= 1007 (disambiguation) =

1007 is a calendar year. It may also refer to:

== Transportation ==
- CANT Z.1007 Alcione, an Italian three-engined medium bomber
- Kentucky Route 1007, a highway in Hopkinsville, Kentucky, US
- Peugeot 1007, a 2005–2009 French mini MPV

== Other uses ==
- 1007 Pawlowia, an asteroid from the asteroid belt
- Papyrus Oxyrhynchus 1007, a fragment of a Septuagint manuscript
