= Brötzmann =

Brötzmann or Brotzman is a German surname. Notable people with the surname include:

- Caspar Brötzmann (born 1962), German electric guitarist
- Donald G. Brotzman (1922–2004), American politician
- Ellis R. Brotzman, American biblical scholar
- Kyle Brotzman (born 1986), American football player
- Peter Brötzmann (1941–2023), German saxophonist and clarinetist
- Thorsten Brötzmann, German record producer, arranger and composer
