= Papyrus Oxyrhynchus 5101 =

Fragmentary manuscript

P.Oxy.77 (LXXVII) 5101
- Sackler Library at Oxford
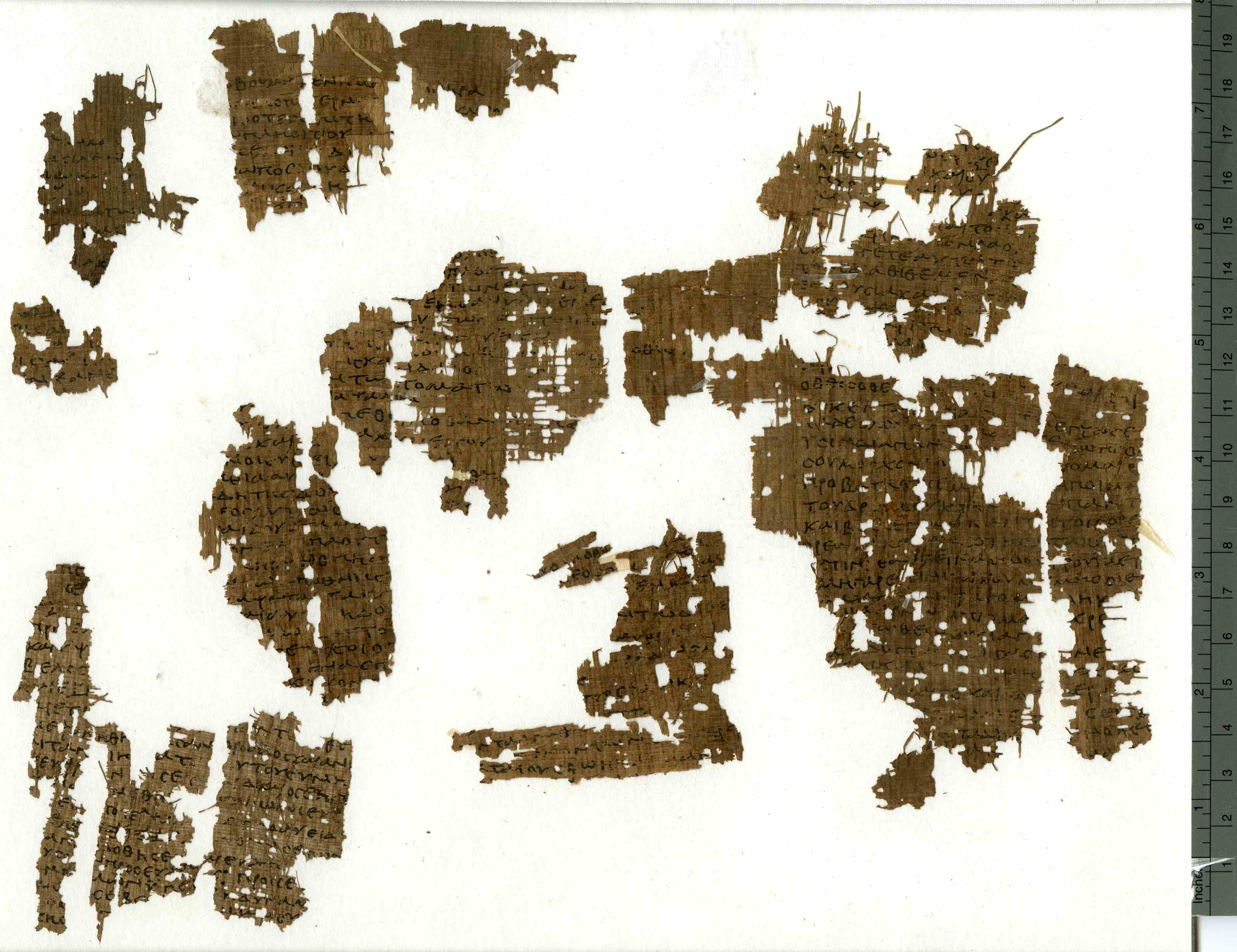
- The Papyrus Oxyrhynchus 5101
- Also known as: Rahlfs 2227
- Type: Manuscript
- Date: 1st-2nd century CE
- Language: Koine Greek
- Material: Papyrus
- Condition: Fragmented
- Script: Uncial
- Contents: Book of Psalms
- Exemplar: Septuagint
- Discovered: Oxyrhynchus (Egypt)

Papyrus Oxyrhynchus 5101 is a manuscript of the Greek Septuagint Psalms (an ancient translation of the Hebrew Bible Psalms), written on papyrus in roll form. It is designated by 2227 in the Alfred Rahlfs numbering of koine Greek Septuagint manuscripts, and P.Oxy.77 (LXXVII) 5101 based on its publication in the Oxyrhynchus Papyri volumes. It has survived in a very fragmentary condition. Using the study of comparative writings styles (palaeography), it has been dated to the middle of the first - middle of the second century CE.

The manuscript uses the Tetragrammaton (name of God in the Hebrew Bible) written in palaeo-Hebrew script instead of substituting it with the Greek title κύριος (kyrios / Lord), and is currently the earliest extant copy of the Septuagint Psalms.

== Description ==
The manuscript was originally a papyrus roll, of which fragments from six columns have survived. The fragments contain Psalms 26:9-14; 44:4-8; 47:13-15; 48:6-21; 49:2-16; 63:6-64:5 according to the numbering of the Septuagint (the Hebrew Bible Psalms number them slightly differently). As noted by biblical scholar Larry Hurtado, "[t]his is probably the earliest extant copy of the Septuagint Psalms." The text was written by an inexperienced writer in uncial script characters.

=== Greek text ===
Transcription of two of the Psalm verses according to biblical scholar Anthony R. Meyer:

Psalms 26:14 (27:14 MT)

[και εψευσατο] η α[δικια ε]αυτη
[πιστευω του ι]διν τα αγαθα
[εν γη ζωντων υπο]μενοντων τον []
[ανδριζου και κρ]αταιουσθω η καρδια σ[ου]
[και υπομεινο]ν τ[ον]

Psalms 64:2 (LXX)

[.]. [ ] εις το τελψαλμος τω Δαυειδ [
[σοι πρ]επει υμνος εν Σειων [
[και σοι] αποδοθησεται ευχη [
[εισακο]υσον προσευχης: προς σε π[ασα

In the above verse, the Masoretic Text reads אלהים (elohim) and the LXX (Greek Septuagint) reads ο θεος (ho theos) but P. Oxy. 5101 reads YHWH.

=== Tetragrammaton ===
The manuscript contains the tetragrammaton to represent the Divine Name of God (YHWH) written in the palaeo-Hebrew script. This manuscript is not a recension and contains the name of God (YHWH) in Paleo-Hebrew letters, thus contradicting the argument that the presence of the tetragrammaton in Paleo-Hebrew letters is the product of a recension to the Hebrew text. According to Meyer, the Greek scribe was not familiar with the tetragram, so instead of changing the original reading, he simply copied it from another manuscript that already contained it; however it has also been argued that a blank space was left, and then the scribe himself decided to write YHWH in Paleo-Hebrew. Meyer states that "still, the evidence of P. Oxy 5101 is too fragmentary to give decisive evidence for the procedure of writing the Tetragrammaton. If P. Oxy 5101 follows the procedure of other Greek biblical texts that write the Tetragrammaton in the paleo-Hebrew script, then it would represent a one-stage writing system". He further comments:

While scholars agree that Greek texts with the Tetragrammaton contain evidence of revision towards a Hebrew exemplar, there are important exceptions, and with only a small pool of evidence, each exception becomes increasingly significant. P. Oxy 5101, for example, is a genuine OG [(Old Greek)] witness of the Psalter, but it also contains the paleo-Hebrew Tetragrammaton. Albert Pietersma states that '[o]n balance nothing impresses me more about 5101 than its early date and its thoroughly Septuagintal character notwithstanding its sole recensional trait, namely, the replacement of κύριος by the tetragram in palaeo-Hebrew script.' If the sole recensional trait is the Tetragrammaton, then the criteria used for establishing this recensional trait begins to break down. In a recent text-critical study, Jannes Smith also affirms the OG character of P. Oxy 5101. He agrees with Pietersma that the paleo-Hebrew Tetragrammaton is the 'recensional trait' of this manuscript, assuming that it has entered the text at some point in transmission history. Smith concludes his study by suggesting that because the Psalter has borrowed language from the Pentateuch it is likely to have emulated its (hypothetical) use of κύριος. Thus '[Ra] 2227 supports an argument in favour of an original κύριος, with the paleo-Hebrew form of the Tetragram as a secondary, archaizing stage'. Even though the important correlation between the recensional features of the manuscript and the presence of the Tetragrammaton is lacking, Pietersma and Smith maintain that the Tetragrammaton is a sign of revision.

Meyer concludes that "on the whole, this line of argumentation to establish the Tetragrammaton as a secondary development based on recensional traits of Greek texts is flawed", and "the presence of ιαω does not decisively answer the question of the earliest OG rendering". He adds: "there is no proof that the reason for the Tetragrammaton is caused by or inherent to the textual character of early revisions of the Old Greek". Whilst speaking concerning the idea of "recension" in regards to another Greek Septuagint manuscript classed among the Dead Sea Scrolls, the Greek Minor Prophets Scroll from Nahal Hever, which is considered to be a kaige recension of the Septuagint (a revision of the Old Greek text to bring it closer to the Hebrew text of the Bible as it existed in ca. 2nd–1st century BCE), biblical scholar Kristin De Troyer remarks: "The problem with a recension is that one does not know what is the original form and what the recension. Hence, is the paleo-Hebrew Tetragrammaton secondary – a part of the recension – or proof of the Old Greek text? This debate has not yet been solved."

== History ==
The manuscript was discovered at Oxyrhynchus (Egypt), and has been catalogued with number P. Oxy 5101. The manuscript has been given an Alfred Rahlfs number of 2227 in the list of Septuagint manuscripts. The fragments were published in 2011 by Danielę Colomo and W.B. Henry in The Oxyrhynchus Papyri, vol LXXVII (77).

The manuscript is currently housed in the Papyrology section of the Sackler Library at Oxford (shelf number 20 3B.36/J(4)B + 27 3B.38/N(1)B + 27 3B.41/J(1-2)c).

== Bibliography ==
- Colomo, Daniela; Henry, W. B. (2011). Oxyrhynchus Papyri LXXVII. The Egypt Exploration Society. pp. 1–11. ISBN 978-0-85698-204-0.
- Colomo, Daniela; Henry, W. B. "P. Oxy. 77 5101". Leuven Database of Ancient Books.
- Smith, Jannes (2012). "The Text-Critical Significance of Oxyrhynchus Papyrus 5101 (Ra 2227) for the Old Greek Psalter" (PDF). Journal of Septuagint and Cognate Studies. 45 (7): 22.
