= Gilyonim =

Talmudic term referring to unspecified heretical works

Gilyonim, or avon gilyon, are terms used by the Mishnah and Talmud to refer to certain heretical works.

== Disputed identity ==
The Jewish Christians of Palestine had a Gospel of their own, the so-called Hebrew Gospel, from which still later Church Fathers quote. Matthew was, likewise, often thought to have been originally written in Hebrew (that is, Aramaic); if so, many copies must, therefore, have been in circulation, and doubts must naturally have arisen concerning the manner in which they were to be disposed of, since they contained mention of the divine name. Indeed, the correct reading in this passage has gilyon in the singular; the gnostic writings (which were sometimes called gilyonim also), however, were many; and had reference to these been intended here the plural would have been used.

However, the 3rd century Aramaic writings of the religion of Manichaeism, did have a single book called evangelion, written in Aramaic, the Gospel of Mani, which was one of their seven sacred writings. Mani was a contemporary of Rav, and from the same area of Babylonia. The central doctrine of Manichaeism was a belief in two powers (a good god versus an evil god), and in Aramaic they were called Maninaya, which in Hebrew would have been Manim.

Regarding the Tosefta passage, Moritz Friedlander argued that attempts to identify these books with Christian gospels in which divine names do not occur are strained. Even R. T. Herford identified the word gilyon as "the unwritten portion of a [heretical] book, the margin ... used for annotations; and it is reasonable to suppose that these annotations would include texts of scripture, quoted as illustrations." Birger Pearson cites Herford as an example of flawed attempts after Friedlander to interpret all occurrences of gilyonim and gilyon as references to Jewish Christianity.

Rabbinic discussion of gilyonim does not always rely on identifying it with Christians or any other heretics in particular. Nonetheless Friedlander (following Krochmal and Grätz) set out a thesis that those labelled as minim by the Rabbis were Gnostics who originated in Jewish circles pre-dating Christianity, and that gilyonim were 'tablets' bearing a gnostic "Ophite diagram" as described by Celsus and Origen. This would explain the opposition from Rabbi Tarfon. However, this thesis has not found wide acceptance, as noted in the Jewish Encyclopedia (1901–1906). Pearson claims that Gnostics and something like the Ophite diagram were known to the Rabbis, and that M. Joel had made this point before Friedlander. Pearson dates this evidence to the early second century, and possibly earlier, in the anti-heretical polemics in the Talmud and Midrash. Daniel Boyarin lists a number of problems with that thesis, citing Karen King’s argument that Gnostic influences in Judaism are entwined with Christian influences. Boyarin is no more prepared to identify minim with Christians than with Gnostics.

Amongst the following scholars, there is a consensus that gilyonim cannot be too readily identified with gospels. William David Davies and Louis Finkelstein consider that gilyonim would not necessarily be Jewish-Christian ‘gospels’. Davies and James Paget cite Karl Georg Kuhn (‘Judentum Urchristentum Kirche’, 1964), and also Maier (1982) to this effect. Kuhn argues that:

- the Talmud passage (Shabbat 116a) is clearly later than the passages from the Tosefta, and too late to be used as a source for the Jamnian period;
- in the Tosefta passages citing Rabbi Tarfon, sifrei minim should be understood not as gospels but as Old Testament texts belonging to heterodox Jewish groups such as those at Qumran as well as to Jewish Christians; and gilyonim should be understood not as gospels but as Marginalia cut off from Biblical texts;
- Rabbi Tarfon is unlikely to have made a pun on books being called ‘gospels’ earlier than Christians were known to have called their books ‘gospels’;
- Rabbi Tarfon is unlikely to have punned gilyonim on merely the second half of the word ‘euangelion’, and there are other grammatical problems making it unlikely that a pun on ‘euangelion’ is in play.

Daniel Boyarin, in line with Kuhn, understands the books to which Rabbi Tarfon referred to be Torah scrolls. Marvin R. Wilson takes the term 'minim' in the Talmud as originally denoting all “dissidents, apostates and traitors” rather than Christians in particular.

Margaret Barker notes that Rabbi Tarfon’s gilyonim referred to “an empty space or a margin” and suggests Tarfon punned on galah meaning "reveal" and hence ‘revelation’, rather than on ‘euangelion’. Barker nonetheless has Christian revelation in view rather than gnosticism.

Barker applies her thesis to Rabbi Yohanan and Rabbi Meir’s aven gilyon and avon gilyon, interpreting them as “worthless revelation” and “iniquitous revelation” respectively. FF Bruce translates the same as 'Sin of the Writing tablet' and 'Iniquity of the Margin'. Barker and Bruce are however agreed on identifying them as puns on euangelion (Christian gospels), whereas Daniel Boyarin has other Jewish heretics in view. Boyarin interprets Rabbi Yohanan and Rabbi Meir’s aven gilyon and avon gilyon as “gilyon of wretchedness” and “gilyon of sin” and identifies them with Jewish ‘apocalypses’, i.e. revelations, such as Enoch.

== Rabbinic sources ==
=== Destruction of gilyonim ===
The principal passage in the Tosefta is as follows:

The gilyonim (גליונים, "scrolls") and the [Biblical] books of the minim are not saved [on Shabbat] from fire; but one lets them burn in their places, together with the names of God written upon them. R. Jose the Galilean says: "On weekdays the names of God are cut out and hidden while the rest is burned." R. Tarfon says: "I swear by the life of my children that if they fall into my hands I shall burn them together with the names of God upon them. For even if I were being chased by an attacker, I would enter a house of idolatry [to escape] but would not enter one of their houses, as idolaters do not know of Him [God] and deny Him, while these know of Him but deny him. As Scripture said: And behind the doors and the posts you have set up your symbol, [for you have uncovered (גִּלִּית, gilita) and gone up from Me]." Rabbi Ishmael says: "If God has said, 'My name that has been written in holiness shall be wiped out by water, in order to make peace between husband and wife,' then all the more should the books of the minim, that cause enmity between Israel and its heavenly Father. ... Just as they are not saved from fire, so they are not saved from a rockslide, or when they have fallen into water, or from [any other] form of destruction."

The same passage is quoted with minor variations in the Babylonian Talmud, Jerusalem Talmud, and Sifre.

The word gilyonim in the plural, means several copies of a single work, not multiple different gospels. The Munich manuscript of the Talmud has here hagilyon (the [single] scroll) where the printed editions have the plural. The title may have been originally briefly ἀγγέλιον (Greek for "Evangelion").

=== Avon gilyon ===
Later in the same passage of the Babylonian Talmud, the following appears:

Rabbi Meir would call [the books which are left to burn] aven gilyon (אוון גליון, "false scroll"). Rabbi Yochanan would call them avon gilyon (עוון גליון, "sin scroll").

The terms aven gilyon and avon gilyon are derogatory puns on ἐυαγγέλιον ("evangelion"). As Rabbi Meir was the descendant of Greek proselytes, it is possible that he, having had a Greek education, simply intended to represent the sound of ἐυαγγέλιον more exactly. However, this explanation would not apply to Rabbi Johanan's comment.

=== The philosopher ===
Next, the Talmud tells the story of Rabban Gamaliel II's dispute with a philosopher (פילוסופא) who said to Gamaliel, "Since the day that you were exiled from your land, the Torah of Moses was taken away, and the avon gilyon was given [in its place], and written in it [is the law that] son and daughter inherit equally" (in contrast to the Torah's rule that daughters do not inherit if a son is alive). Later the philosopher said, "I reached the end of the avon gilyon, and it is written: 'I [the author] did not come to subtract from the Torah of Moses, or to add to the Torah of Moses.' And it is written there: In a situation where there is a son, the daughter does not inherit." The philosopher's statements in this story reflect Christian beliefs; it cannot be determined whether the new law regarding the right of daughters to inherit was included in the original Hebrew Gospel.

=== Sanctity of scrolls ===
Another passage shows that the Gospels have not the sanctity of the Biblical books:

The Gilyonim and the [Biblical] books of the "Minim" (Judæo-Christians?) do not render the hands unclean. The books of Ben Sira and all books written from now onward do not render the hands unclean.

The Gospels are not otherwise mentioned in the Talmud or Midrash. However, from the Talmudic narratives about Jesus it appears that the contents of the Gospel were known to the Talmudic teachers.

== See also ==
- Apostasy in Judaism
- Criticism of Judaism
- Epikoros
- Heresy in Judaism
- Jewish schisms
- Jewish skeptics
- Tetragrammaton in the New Testament
