= Epikoros =

Jewish term meaning "a heretic"

Epikoros (or apikoros or apikores; Hebrew: אֶפִּיקוֹרוֹס, romanized: ˌʾeppikoˈros, lit. 'Epicurus', pl. epikorsim; Yiddish: אַפּיקורס, romanized: apiˈkoyres) is a Jewish term figuratively meaning "a heretic", cited in the Mishnah, that refers to an individual who does not have a share in the World to Come:

כָּל יִשְׂרָאֵל יֵשׁ לָהֶם חֵלֶק לָעוֹלָם הַבָּא, שֶׁנֶּאֱמַר (ישעיה ס) וְעַמֵּךְ כֻּלָּם צַדִּיקִים לְעוֹלָם יִירְשׁוּ אָרֶץ נֵצֶר מַטָּעַי מַעֲשֵׂה יָדַי לְהִתְפָּאֵר. וְאֵלּוּ שֶׁאֵין לָהֶם חֵלֶק לָעוֹלָם הַבָּא, הָאוֹמֵר אֵין תְּחִיַּת הַמֵּתִים מִן הַתּוֹרָה, וְאֵין תּוֹרָה מִן הַשָּׁמָיִם, וְאֶפִּיקוֹרֶס.

All of the Jewish people have a share in the World-to-Come, as it is stated: "And your people also shall be all righteous, they shall inherit the land forever; the branch of My planting, the work of My hands, for My name to be glorified" (Isaiah 60:21). And these [are the exceptions,] the people who have no share in the World-to-Come [...] One who says: There is no resurrection of the dead derived from the Torah, and one who says: The Torah did not originate from Heaven, and an epikoros[.]

— Babylonian Talmud, Sanhedrin 10:1

The rabbinic literature uses the term epikoros without a specific reference to the Greek philosopher Epicurus, but some understand that the term is derived from his name. Epicurus was a materialist philosopher whose views contradicted Hebrew Bible, the strictly monotheistic conception of God in Judaism, and the Jewish belief in the World to Come (see Epicureanism § Philosophy).

The Talmudic interpretation is that the Aramaic word is derived from the Semitic root פק"ר (p-k-r, lit. 'licentious'), and accordingly:

אפיקורוס: רב ור' חנינא אמרי תרוייהו זה המבזה ת"ח רבי יוחנן ור' יהושע בן לוי אמרי זה המבזה חבירו בפני ת"ח

§ [The Mishnah teaches that those who have no share in the World-to-Come include] an epikoros. Rav and Rabbi Ḥanina both say: This is one who treats a Torah scholar with contempt. Rabbi Yoḥanan and Rabbi Yehoshua ben Levi say: This is one who treats another with contempt before a Torah scholar.

— Babylonian Talmud, Sanhedrin 99b:14

Marcus Jastrow, in his dictionary, identifies the term as, in fact, being an enlargement of פק"ר, which was then supported by its phonetic coincidence with the famed pagan philosopher.

According to Maimonides, scorning a Talmid Chakham (Hebrew: ת"ח, romanized: talmiḏ ḥaḫām, "[wise] Torah scholar") is actually a singular case of disrespecting the entire Torah or its rabbinic scholar-sages. In his work Mishneh Torah (Yad, Teshuvah 3:8), Maimonides rules that an epikoros is a person who denies that God communicates with humans through prophecy; one who denies the prophecy of Moses; or one who denies God's knowledge of the affairs of humans (i.e., one who maintains there is no divine providence). Maimonides probably encountered the name of Epicurus sometime between composing his commentary on the Mishnah and the Guide for the Perplexed. In the first source, he states that the rabbinic term epikoros is an Aramaic word; in the Guide, Maimonides has become aware of the atheistic doctrine of the philosopher by that name. He cites the source of his information as Alexander of Aphrodisias's treatise On Providence.

Following the Christian censorship of the Talmud, starting with the aftermath of the Disputation of Barcelona and during the Roman and Spanish Inquisitions, the term spread within the Jewish classical texts. Censors shunned expressions like minim ("sectarian"), which they viewed as referring to the Christian faith, and replaced them with the term epikoros or Epicurus (hence, a heretic as the church would understand them). The censors also replaced terms that refer to Christians with the word Hebrew: עכו"ם, romanized: ʿakum, an abbreviation of Hebrew: עֲבוֹדַת כּוֹכָבִים וּמַזָּלוֹת, romanized: ʿavoḏat koḵāvim umazzāloṯ, lit. 'worshiper of stars and constellations', a belief that both Jews and their Christian censors abhorred.

== See also ==
- Apostasy in Judaism
- Criticism of Judaism
- Gilyonim
- Heresy in Judaism
- Heresy in Orthodox Judaism
- Hiloni
- Jewish atheism
- Jewish secularism
- Jewish schisms
- Jewish skeptics
- K-F-R
- List of Jewish atheists and agnostics
- Off the derech
- Secularism in Israel
