= Kaige revision =

Group of revisions to the Septuagint

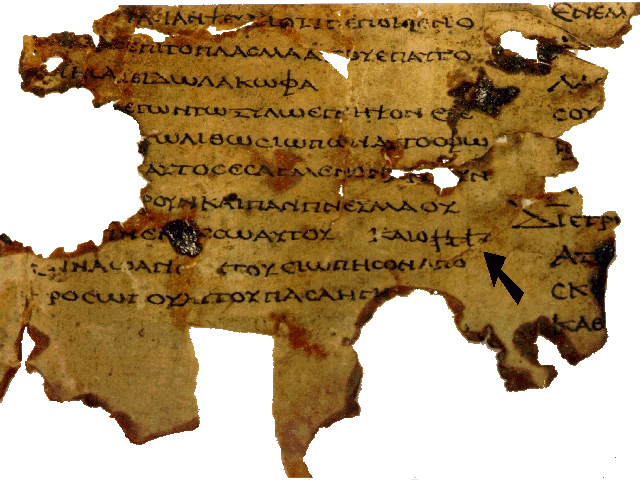
Lower part of col. 18 (according to E. Tov) of the Greek Minor Prophets Scroll from Nahal Hever (8HevXII gr). The arrow points at the divine name in paleo-Hebrew script

The kaige revision, or simply kaige, is the group of revisions to the Septuagint made in order to more closely align its translation with the proto-Masoretic Hebrew. The name kaige derives from the revision's pervasive use of Koine Greek: και γε [kai ge] ("and indeed") to translate the Hebrew: וְגַם [wə gam] ("and also").

The importance of this revision lies in its status as a precursor to later revisions by 'the Three' (i.e., Aquila, Symmachus and Theodotion) as well as the light it sheds on the origins of the Septuagint.

The individual revisions characteristic of kaige were first observed by Dominique Barthélemy in the Greek Minor Prophets Scroll from Nahal Hever. According to Arie Van Der Kooij "his thesis about the K[aige] T[ranslation] has been widely accepted, but his dating of Theodotion before Aquila has not."

== Tetragrammaton ==
Ellis R. Brotzman and Eric J. Tully claim that a characteristic of the kaige translation is that it wrote YHWH (יהוה) in paleo-Hebrew script as 𐤉𐤄𐤅𐤄 instead of translating it into Greek. When referring to kaige recension in 8HevXII gr, Kristin De Troyer makes the following affirmation: "The problem with a recension is that one does not know what is the original form and what the recension. Hence, is the paleo-Hebrew Tetragrammaton secondary – a part of the recension – or proof of the Old Greek (OG) text? This debate has not yet been solved."

== Influence on the New Testament ==
Emanuel Tov wrote that "in some books of the New Testament and in early Christian literature, Hebraizing revisions of the OG often were quoted rather than the OG version itself, reflecting the beginning of the decline of the LXX (the OG) in Judaism". According to Tuukka Kauhanen, the authors of the New Testament may also have known a kaige type Septuagint text. Some scholars have exposed different views to explain why in citation of Zechariah 12:10 in John 19:37 "with known forms of the text reveals that it demonstrates many similarities with the Hebrew Masoretic text", which includes Martin Hengel who "speak of possibly identifying John's citation with... 8HevXII gr. Tov also wrote that D. A. Koch has shown that in his letters, Paul sometimes "refers to recensions of the Old Greek towards a proto-Masoretic text."

== See also ==
- Bible translations into Greek
- Hexapla
