= Jewish skeptics =

Jews who have held skeptical views on matters of the Jewish religion

Jewish skeptics are Jews (historically, Jewish philosophers) who have held skeptical views on matters of the Jewish religion. In general, these skeptical views regard some or all of the "principles of faith," whatever these may be (see Maimonides, Albo), but historically Jewish skepticism is directed either at (1) the existence of the God of Judaism or (2) the authenticity and veracity of the Torah.

== Background on Jewish skepticism ==
A skeptic in the strongest sense is one who remains in a state of doubt, declaring all positive truth, religious or philosophical, to be unattainable to man. This type of skeptic can scarcely be found in Judaism. However bold the Jewish philosophers of the Middle Ages were in their research or critical in their analytic methods, they never so distrusted human reason as to deny it the power, as the Greek skeptics did, to arrive at any positive knowledge or truth. Seer and sage alike appealed to reason to substantiate and verify the postulates of faith (Isa. 40:26; Job 12:7). The passage "The Lord is a God of knowledge" (I Sam. 2:3) is interpreted by the Rabbis by the remark, "Great is knowledge which leads from God to God" (Ber. 33a).

=== Skepticism in the Bible and Talmud ===
In a work by Emile Joseph Dillon, entitled The Skeptics of the Old Testament (London, 1895/1973), it has been suggested that the authors of the Book of Job, of Ecclesiastes, and of the Words of Agur, the Son of Jakeh, were skeptics, but the original compositions were so interpolated and remodeled as to make the skeptical points no longer noticeable. All three contain bold arraignments of divine justice and providence. As to the author of Ecclesiastes compare E. H. Plumptre's edition: "He was almost driven back upon the formula of the skepticism of Pyrrho, 'Who knows?'" (p. 49). Heinrich Heine called the book Das Hohelied der Skepsis. Friedrich Delitzsch, in Das Buch Hiob (p. 17), calls Ecclesiastes Das Hohelied des Pessimismus, but he might as well have called it "the Song of Skepticism."

Jewish skepticism was always chiefly concerned with the moral government of the world. The great problem of life, with "its righteous ones suffering woe, and its wicked ones enjoying good fortune," which puzzled the mind of Jeremiah, and Moses also, according to the Rabbis, and which finds striking expression in the Psalms, created skeptics in Talmudic as well as in earlier times. Elisha ben Abuyah became a skeptic as a consequence of seeing a person meet with a fatal accident at the very moment when he was fulfilling the two divine commandments for the observance of which Scripture holds out the promise of a long life.

=== Skepticism in the Medieval era ===
The rationalistic era of Islam produced skeptics among the Jews of the time of Saadia, such as was Ḥiwi al-Balkhi, whose criticism tended to undermine the belief in revelation. The Emunot ve-Deot was written by Saadia, as he says in the preface, because of the many doubters who were to be convinced of the truth; and Maimonides, in the introduction to his Moreh, states that he wrote that work as a guide for those perplexed by doubt. With all these Jewish thinkers doubt is not a sin, but an error that may reveal the pathway to the higher philosophical truth.

A remarkable type of skeptic was produced by the sixteenth century in Uriel Acosta, who, amidst a life of restless searching after truth, denied the immortality of the soul and the divine revelation. His excommunication by the Amsterdam authorities was inspired by fear of the Christian Church rather than by traditional practice. Another such was Leon of Modena, who, complaining that "the thinker is tortured by doubt, whereas the blind believer enjoys peace of mind, and bliss in the world to come" (see Ari Nohem, quoted by H. Grätz, Gesch. 3d ed., x. 130), arrived through skepticism at a liberal interpretation of traditional Judaism (see S. Stern, Der Kampf des Rabbiners Gegen den Talmud im xviii. Jahrhundert, 1902).

=== Skepticism in the Early Modern and Modern Period ===
Strictly speaking, Jewish engagement with atheism (i.e. disbelief in God’s existence) can scarcely be found before the modern period, unless one expands the definition to include biblical condemnations of practical atheism (i.e. non-observance), and Jewish attraction to ancient world beliefs that might be said to have challenged the idea of Jewish monotheism. Of course, there were also debates about the existence of others’ gods (e.g. disbelief in the official gods of the Classical world, or disbelief in the triune God of Christianity), which generated condemnations of Jewish atheism. Likewise, serious Jewish encounters with the Greek sources of philosophical scepticism (i.e. disbelief that a true knowledge of things is attainable by humans) are rare until thinkers like Simone Luzzatto in the early-modern period, although a weaker definition of scepticism (i.e. doubts about authority and suspension of judgment in approaching sources of knowledge, whether secular or sacred) might be said to have a Jewish legacy from the time of the first-century philosopher Philo onwards, including tantalizing figures such as Elisha Ben Abuyah in the Talmud, and especially in the form of medieval fideism (i.e. the idea that faith is independent of reason). These shallow intellectual eddies of pre-modern doubt about God’s existence and nature, and about the veracity of human knowledge derived through tradition, became stronger currents with the seventeenth-century philosopher Spinoza, who was regarded by many as atheistic, and with the eighteenth-century Jewish Enlightenment or Haskalah. From that time suspicion of revealed religion began its ascendency and the ties of religion loosened so that less ambiguously sceptical expressions within Jewry began to be heard. However it was the nineteenth-century culture of scientific progress, and the attendant popular interest in ostensibly naturalistic and materialistic writings in the 1870s (especially those of Marx, Nietzsche and Freud in Germany; Spencer, Huxley, and Russell in England; and Ingersoll in the US), that provoked a sea change in popular Jewish thought. Increasingly, the God of revelational religion simply appeared too naïve to countenance. It was from that time that a good number of Jewish thinkers felt obliged to establish oppositional, alternative, synthetic, or complementary models explicitly relating Judaism to the challenges of such atheistic and materialistic philosophies. Significant scholarship on the subject exists – such as the studies of Giuseppe Veltri and David Ruderman in the early-modern period [1] – but that scholarship tends to be localized and fragmented in nature and we still await a general survey of these related topic.[2]

[1] Among Ruderman’s most important contributions is David Ruderman, Jewish Thought and Scientific Discovery in Early Modern Europe (New Haven, Conn.: Yale University Press, 1995). Veltri currently directs a research programme on Jewish Scepticism at the University of Hamburg and among his most relevant publications is Giuseppe Veltri, “Principles of Jewish Skeptical Thought. The Case of Judah Moscato and Simone Luzzatto,” in Rabbi Judah Moscato and the Jewish Intellectual World of Mantua in 16th-17th Centuries, ed. Giuseppe Veltri and Gianfranco Miletto (Boston: Brill, 2012). Together they co-edited David Ruderman and Giuseppe Veltri, eds., Cultural Intermediaries: Jewish Intellectuals in Early Modern Italy (Philadelphia University of Pennsylvania Press, 2004).

[2] Historically speaking, the topics have not tended to feature in reference works. There is, however, a short entry for ‘atheism’ in the Jewish Encyclopedia, its inclusion being best explained by the idiosyncratic philosophical and interfaith interests of the authors, the Reform rabbis Emil G. Hirsch and Kaufmann Kohler. Emil G. Hirsch and Kaufmann Kohler, “Atheism,” in Jewish Encyclopedia, ed. Isidore Singer (New York: Funk and Wagnalls Company, 1901-1906). And see also Alvin J. Reines, “Skeptics and Skepticism,” in Encyclopaedia Judaica (Second Edition), ed. Michael Berenbaum and Fred Skolnik (Jerusalem: Keter Publishing House, 2007). A more recent collection of studies is Daniel Langton, ed, Atheism, Scepticism and Challenges to Monotheism (Gorgias Press, 2015).

== Skepticism on the God of Judaism ==
Skepticism on the existence of the God of religion relates either to doubts that any supernatural entity such as God exists, or that the God of the Jews exists as described by the Jewish tradition (not, however, ruling out completely the existence of supernatural entities).

- Chivi ha-Balki
- Sherwin Wine
- Baruch Spinoza
- Elisha ben Avuya

== Skepticism on the authenticity of the Torah ==
Skeptics on the authenticity of the Torah are individuals who hold a position rejecting the divine authorship of some or all of the Torah.

- Spinoza
- Korach, considered a skeptic by the Talmudic Sages

== See also ==
- Apostasy in Judaism
- Category:Jewish skeptics
- Criticism of Judaism
- Epikoros
- Gilyonim
- Hiloni
- Jewish heretics
- Jewish schisms
- Jewish secularism
- List of Jewish atheists and agnostics
