= Papyrus Oxyrhynchus 4443 =

Greek Septuagint manuscript fragment

Papyrus Oxyrhynchus 4443 (also P.Oxy. 65. 4443, TM 61923, LDAB 3080, Rahlfs 0996) is a fragment of a Septuagint manuscript (LXX) written on papyrus in scroll form. It is the oldest extant manuscript that contains Esther 8:16–9:3 of the Septuagint text and verse numbering, according to the text of LXX. The manuscript has been assigned palaeographically to 50–150 CE.

== Description ==
This fragment of a papyrus roll contains 31 lines of text in 3 columns. It is of semi-cursive script type.

=== Treatment to the name of God ===
The Hebrew book of Esther does not contain the tetragrammaton, so Anthony R. Meyer states that "it is well-known that the Tetragrammaton does not occur, and God plays virtually no role in the narrative. In the translation of this book, then, we have no reason to expect to find κύριος". A remarkable feature of the Greek Book of Ester, is that it has written the word θεός uncontracted, in Greek apocryphal additions, in which the word θεός (אֱלהִים) is not found in the Book of Esther of the Hebrew Bible (e.g. Masoretic Text).

The scroll form and the presence of the uncontracted word θεός (theos, not in nomina sacra form) suggest that it is of Jewish rather than Christian origin. The Masoretic Text of Esther makes no mention whatever of God under any title, although God is mentioned throughout the Septuagint text of the book and even more often in the independent "Alpha Text".

=== Content ===
The text of the fragment consists mainly of a letter of Ahasuerus that Jerome moved to form chapter 16:1–24 of the Vulgate. It is also referred to as Addition E and in the Septuagint text stood between verses 8:12 and 8:13 of the shorter Masoretic Text. According to Richard H. Hiers addition E "makes much pious reference to the power and justice of God".

=== Location ===
This manuscript comes from Bahnasa, Oxyrhychus, Egypt. Currently the manuscript is kept in Oxford, Sackler Library, Papyrology Rooms P. Oxy. 4443.

== Sources ==
- Hacham, Noah; Ilan, Tal, eds. (2022). The Early-Roman Period (30 BCE–117 CE). Walter de Gruyter GmbH & Co KG. ISBN 9783110787764.
- Meyer, Anthony R. (2022). Naming God in Early Judaism: Aramaic, Hebrew, and Greek. Studies in Cultural Contexts of the Bible. Vol. 2. Brill I Schoeningh. ISBN 978-3-657-70350-0.
