= Ulrich B. Schmid =

German Protestant theologian

- Born: 31 May 1962; Stuttgart
- Education: Doctor of Philosophy, Doctor of Theology, habilitation
- Alma mater: University of Birmingham; University of Münster
- Occupation: Theologian, university teacher, writer, historian
- Employer: Theological College Wuppertal/Bethel

Ulrich B. Schmid (born 31 May 1962 in Stuttgart) is a German Protestant theologian and university teacher.

== Biography ==
Ulrich Schmid is married and has a child.

=== Education ===
Schmid studied from 1982 to 1989 Protestant theology at the University of Tübingen and at Münster. The first ecclesiastical examination in 1989 was followed by a study of philosophy, ancient history and Byzantine studies in Münster from 1989 to 1992. From 1993 to 1995 followed the Vicariate and then in 1995 the 2nd ecclesiastical examination.

In the academic field he was awarded a doctorate in 1995 by the Protestant Theological Faculty of the University of Münster for Doctor of Theology. With a habilitation scholarship of the German Research Foundation (DFG) he continued his academic career in the years 1996 to 1998. From 1997 to 1998 he worked as a Fellow at the Netherlands Institute for Advanced Study (NIAS), from 1998 to 2000 at the University of Amsterdam.

At the Kirchliche Hochschule Bethel he was habilitated in 2002. In 2005, he published a book titled Unum ex quattuor. Eine Geschichte der lateinischen Tatianüberlieferung with Verlag Herder.

== Academic work ==
In 2008 he became an associate professor at Kirchliche Hochschule Wuppertal/Bethel.

Since 2002 he has been a research assistant at various institutions in Amsterdam, Münster, Wuppertal, Birmingham. Since 2015 he is a research associate at the Göttingen Academy of Sciences and Humanities.

Ulrich Schmid's areas of expertise are the New Testament, History of Christianity in general and the Early Christianity, such as Marcion, Tatian, the theology of the Middle Ages (Diatessaron) and the field of textual research (Ancient Greek and Latin tradition of the Christian Bible) in particular.

He is a member (as of 2019) in the following scientific associations: Kerkhistorisch Gezelschap, Society of Biblical Literature, Studiorum Novi Testamenti Societas, Committee of the International Greek New Testament Project.

== Award ==
In 1999 he received the Hendrik Casimir-Karl Ziegler Research Award of the North Rhine-Westphalian Academy of Sciences, Humanities and the Arts.
