= Papyrus Oxyrhynchus 656 =

Greek papyrus fragment

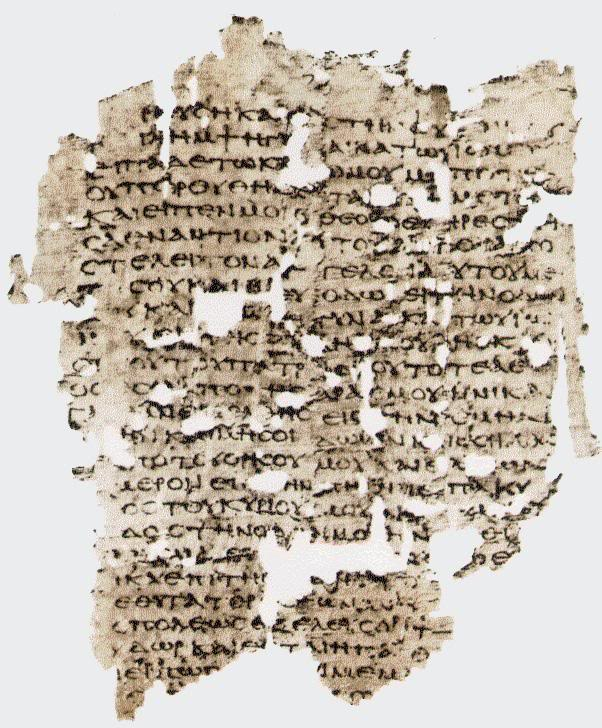
A fragment of Genesis.

Papyrus Oxyrhynchus 656 (abbreviated as P.Oxy.IV 656, VH 13, LBAD 3094, or Rahlfs 905) – is a Greek fragment of a Septuagint manuscript written on papyrus in codex form. This is a manuscript discovered at Oxyrhynchus, and it has been catalogued with number 656. Palaeographycally it is dated to late second century or early third century.

== Description ==
The manuscript was written on papyrus, in codex form. The surviving fragments are four pieces of 24 cm by 20 cm. The fragments contain Genesis (14:21-23, 15:5-9, 19:32-20:11, 24:28-47, 27:32,33,40,41), written in Koine Greek. According to C. H. Roberts and van Haelst, it is almost certain to be Jewish.

=== Treatment to the name of God ===
Jason David BeDuhn, quoting Emanuel Tov wrote:

The transition from the practice of preserving YHWH in archaic Hebrew letters to replacing it with the Greek kurios can be seen in Papyrus Oxyrhynchus 656 (Rahlfs 950). In the text of Genesis preserved in this manuscript, the original scribe left blank spaces for YHWH exactly like the scribe of PFouad 266 did. But later another scribe instead of writing YHWH into those spaces wrote kurios.

Martin Rösel states that in this manuscript the first scribe left four gaps, three of which were filled by another with the word κύριος. Similarly, in Papyrus Rylands 458 a blank space remains, large enough for either κύριος or the Tetragrammaton. According to Philip Wesley Comfort, who speaks of the Papyrus Oxyrhynchus 656 gaps as four-letter spaces, they were intended to be filled in with the Tetragrammaton in Paleo-Hebrew script, but for lack of someone capable of writing in that script, the Greek surrogate κύριος was squeezed in instead.

== History ==
The fragment was published in 1904 by Bernard P. Grenfell and Artur S. Hunt in The Oxyrhynchus Papyri, vol IV. The number 905 was given to the fragments list of septuagint manuscripts according classification system of Alfred Rahlfs.
