= Papyrus Oxyrhynchus 1007 =

Greek Septuagint manuscript fragment

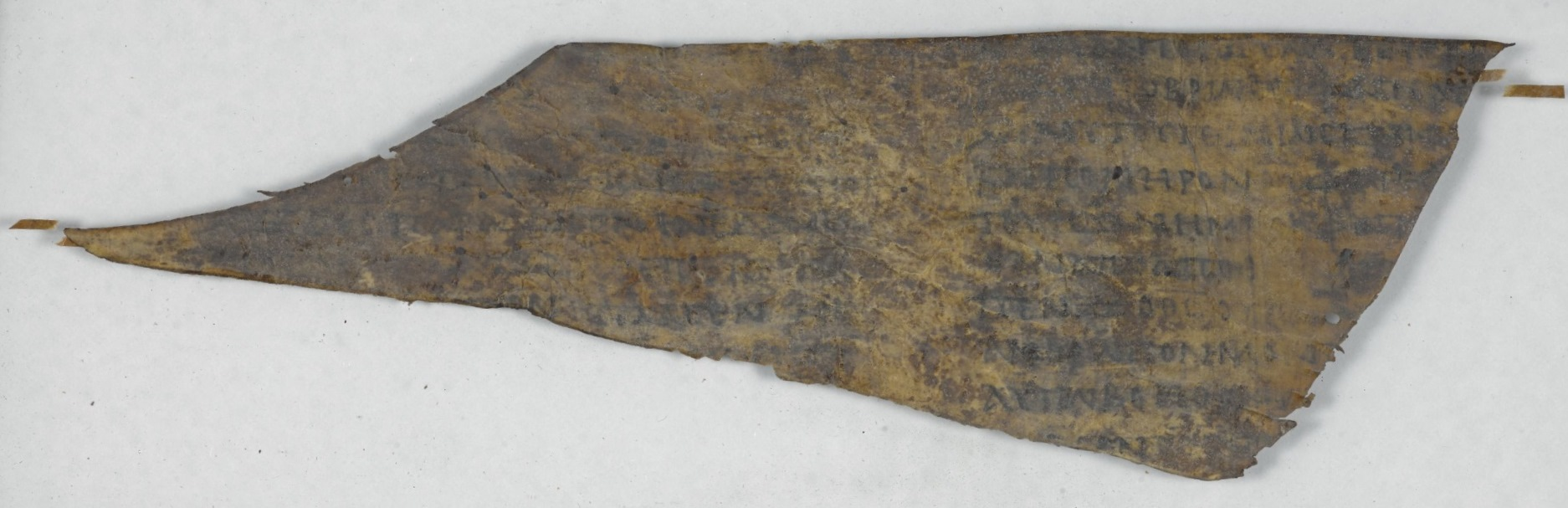
LXXP.Oxy.VII.1007

Papyrus Oxyrhynchus 1007 (also known as LXX^{P.Oxy.VII.1007}; P.Oxy. VII 1007; P.Lond.Lit. 199; TM 61956; LDAB 3113; Rahlfs 907) is a fragment of a Greek Septuagint manuscript written on parchment. The manuscript was discovered in Oxyrhynchus, modern El-Bahnasa, Egypt. Using the study of comparative writing styles (palaeography), the manuscript has been dated to the 3rd century CE.

== Description ==
The manuscript is a codex (precursor to the modern book), containing sections of the Book of Genesis (2:7-9, 2:16-19 on the front; 2:23-3:1, 3:6-8 on the back) written in 33 lines in 2 columns.

=== God's name ===
This manuscript contains the name of God "abbreviated by doubling the initial yod, written in the shape of a z with a horizontal line through the middle, and carried unbroken through both characters ~~zz~~." The fragment is difficult to identify as either Christian or Jewish, as on the barely legible front side it contains the nomen sacrum Θ̅Σ̅ (characteristic of Christian manuscripts) in Gen 2:18, and the name of God written in Hebrew with a double Yodh (characteristic of Jewish manuscripts).

Alan Mugridge states regarding LXX^{P.Oxy.VII.1007} and Papyrus Oxyrhynchus 656:

"It has been suggested that two OT papyri, listed here as Christian, are actually Jewish. In 3 [ie, P. Oxy. VII 1007] (2nd half III AD) two yodhs (...) appear for the Divine Name. A second hand wrote the Divine Name as κυριος with a different ‘pen’ from the rest of the text in 9 [ie, P. Oxy. IV 656] (II/III AD), perhaps a second writer assigned to insert the Divine Name. This is not sufficient reason, however, to conclude that these two papyri are Jewish, since Jewish strands within early Christianity existed throughout the period under review, as we noted earlier. Hence, this practice may just reflect current practice in Jewish-Christian groups, which did not fade away as early or as completely as is often thought. (...) If 3 [ie, P. Oxy. VII 1007] is a Christian papyrus – and the use of the nomen sacrum θς would seem to support this – it is the only example of an attempt to write something resembling Hebrew characters in a Christian manuscript."

== History ==
The manuscript was published in The Oxyrhynchus Papyri, part VII, edited and translated by Arthur S. Hunt, London, 1910, pages 1 and 2. It was catalogued with the number 907 in the list of manuscripts of the Septuagint as classified by Alfred Rahlfs, and also signed as Van Haelst 5. It is given the identification 3113 on the Leuven Database of Ancient Books.

== Current location ==
The manuscript is located in the department of manuscripts in the British Library, London (Inv. 2047).

== Bibliography ==
- Bernard P. Grenfell and Artur S. Hunt. "P.Oxy.VII 1007". The Oxyrhynchus Papyri vol. VII. Oxyrhynchus Online. Archived from the original on July 14, 2014.
- Waddell, W. G. (1944-07-01). "The Tetragrammaton in the LXX". The Journal of Theological Studies. os–XLV (179–180): 158–161. doi:10.1093/jts/os-XLV.179-180.158.
