= Philip Comfort =

American professor, writer, Bible expert (born 1950)

Philip W. Comfort
- Born: 28 October 1950 (age 76)
- Died: December 31, 2022

Philosophical work
- Region: New Testament Studies
- School: New Testament, textual criticism
- Main interests: New testament manuscripts

Philip Wesley Comfort (28 October 1950–31 December 2022) was a professor, writer, editor and expert on the Bible who specialized in textual criticism of the New Testament. He served as Professor of Greek and New Testament at Trinity Episcopal Seminary, visiting professor at Wheaton College, and senior Bible reference editor at Tyndale House Publishers.

== Education ==
Comfort studied English, Greek and New Testament literature at Ohio State University and the University of South Africa. He completed his doctorate under the guidance of a prominent textual critic, Jacobus H. Petzer, at the University of South Africa.

== Career ==
Comfort taught classes at a number of colleges, including Wheaton College, Trinity Episcopal Seminary, Columbia International University, and Coastal Carolina University. Prior to his retirement he was a senior editor of Bible reference at Tyndale and served as editor of the New Testament for the New Living Translation. He contributed to various publications and Tyndale collections, both as a writer and editor. Among his works are The New Greek-English Interlinear New Testament, The Origin of the Bible, The Tyndale Bible Dictionary, Essential Guide to Bible Versions, The Text of the Earliest New Testament Greek Manuscripts (with D. Barrett), New Testament Text and Translation Commentary, and Who's Who in Christian History. He also served as General Editor for the multi-volume Cornerstone Biblical Commentary.

== Personal life ==
Comfort lived in Pawleys Island, South Carolina, United States. He was married to Georgia Comfort.

== Works ==
- Encountering the Manuscripts: An Introduction to New Testament Paleography and Textual Criticism.
- Holman Treasury of Key Bible Words in the Holman Reference Collection (co-author).
- Oceanic (Shrewsbury UK: Feather Books).
- Last Wave Poetry (Finishing Line Press).
- I am Carolina Poetry (Finishing Line Press).
- Wings Poetry (Finishing Line Press).
- Seascapes Poetry (Finishing Line Press).
- The One Year Book of Poetry (Tyndale House Publishers) 1999. Co-written with Daniel Partner.

He has also edited a number of books, including:

- Text of the Earliest New Testament Greek Manuscripts.
- Life Application Bible Commentary: 1 & 2 Corinthians.

== See also ==
- List of New Testament papyri
