= Ellis R. Brotzman =

American biblical scholar

Ellis R. Brotzman is an American Old Testament scholar. He served as Senior Old Testament Language and Literature Professor at Tyndale Theological Seminary in the Netherlands. Brotzman is best known for his book Old Testament Textual Criticism: A Practical Introduction.

Brotzman studied at Wheaton College, the University of Chicago, and Dallas Theological Seminary before obtaining a PhD at New York University.

In 2010, a Festschrift was published in his honor: My Brother's Keeper: Essays in Honor of Ellis R. Brotzman.
