= Kristin De Troyer =

- Born: 26 May 1963 (age 63); Ninove, Belgium

Academic background
- Education: Leiden University

Academic work
- Discipline: theology and Biblical studies
- Institutions: Claremont Graduate University; University of Göttingen; University of Saint Katherine; University of Salzburg; University of St Andrews
- Main interests: Old Testament
- Notable works: De Septuaginta Investigationes; Contributions to Biblical Exegesis and Theology

Kristin Mimi Lieve Leen De Troyer (born 26 May 1963 in Ninove) is an Old Testament scholar, theologian, writer and a university professor who has taught at different universities such as the University of Salzburg, the University of St Andrews, and Claremont School of Theology. She is the author of many scholarly books and articles, an editor of several academic series, and a professor and researcher of the Hebrew Bible, the Septuagint, Judaism and the Dead Sea Scrolls. In 2024 she served as Vice-Principal at the University of Salzburg. From 2021 to 2025, she served as the Secretary of the European Academy of Sciences and Arts; in 2026, she was elected Vice-President of the European Academy of Sciences and Arts.

== Biography ==
K. De Troyer was born 1963 in Ninove, Belgium.

== Education ==
De Troyer holds a B.A. in Religious Studies (Leuven, Belgium, 1983), a B.A. in Philosophy (Leuven, 1984), a B.A. in Theology (Leuven, 1986), a M.A. in Religious Studies (Leuven, 1986), Diploma Religious Education (Leuven, 1986), M.A. in Theology (Leuven, 1987) and a Ph.D. (Leiden University, The Netherlands, 1997).

== Teaching work ==
She was research assistant (1987 to 1989) in the Department of Old Testament at Catholic University of Leuven. Later, from 1989 to 1998 she taught as lecturer in Old Testament at Catholic Seminary Breda (1997-1998 subject group leader). From 1998 to 2008, she taught first as associate professor, then, from 2001 onwards, as professor of Hebrew Bible and Old Testament at Claremont Graduate University and Claremont School of Theology in Claremont, California. She became a professor of Old Testament and Hebrew Bible at the University of St Andrews from 2008 to 2015. In 2010 and 2011, she was a guest-lecturer at the Septuagint-Unternehmen (Göttingen Academy of Sciences and Humanities, University of Göttingen). From 2013 to 2015 she also was Dean of Arts & Divinity at the University of St Andrews, Scotland. Since 2015 De Troyer has been honorary professor of Hebrew Bible and Old Testament at the University of St. Andrews School of Divinity and Professor of Old Testament in Salzburg. She currently holds the Seymour Gitin Professorship at the Albright Institute of Archaeological Research in Jerusalem and is also Distinguished Fellow of the Hebrew University in Jerusalem

== Editorial work ==
De Troyer is co-editor of the international Vandenhoeck & Ruprecht academic publication series for Septuagint research, De Septuaginta Investigationes. She is also editor in chief, together with Geert Van Oyen, of the series Contributions to Biblical Exegesis and Theology, published by Peeters in Louvain, Deuterocanonical and Cognate Studies, published by de Gruyter, in Berlin. Together with Friedrich Reiterer and in collaboration with Reinhard Feldmeier she edits the journal Biblische Notizen / Biblical Notes. She is also a member of the editorial boards of the academic journals Textus, Journal for the Study of the Old Testament and Journal of Ancient Judaism. From 2014 to 2019 De Troyer served as a member of the scientific advisory board for the Finnish Academy's Centre of Excellence Changes in Sacred Texts and Traditions. Since 2019 she is a member of the European Academy of Sciences and Arts.

From 2015 to 2019 De Troyer was president of the European Society of Women in Theological Research.

== Research ==
Kristin De Troyer's research focuses on the Septuagint and the textual history of the Hebrew Bible. Her publications deal especially with the various Hebrew and Greek versions of the Book of Joshua and the Book of Esther. A central conclusion in De Troyer's research is that the processes of rewriting are similar between biblical textual witnesses and those early Jewish texts that were not included in the biblical canon. She has, for example, demonstrated that the initial Septuagint translation, the Old Greek text, of Josh 10 was translated from an earlier Hebrew source text than the Masoretic Text, which is used in most modern editions of the Hebrew Bible. According to her, the Masoretic Text reflects later redactional reworking of this shorter Hebrew source text.

=== Manuscripts ===
De Troyer has edited for publication two 2nd century CE Greek papyri from the Schøyen Collection: MS 2648 containing Josh 9:27-11:2 and MS 2649 containing parts of Leviticus. MS 2648 is the earliest extant Septuagint Joshua manuscript and preserves a text predating the Hexaplaric revision of Origen and is considered a witness to the Old Greek text.

== Books ==
- The Ultimate and the Penultimate Text of the Book of Joshua. Louvain: Peeters, 2018.(ISBN 978-90-429-3736-9)
- Die Septuaginta und die Endgestalt des Alten Testaments. Göttingen: Vandenhoeck & Ruprecht, 2005. (ISBN 382-522-599-2)
- Rewriting the Sacred Text. What the Old Greek Texts Tell Us about the Literary Growth of the Bible. Leiden: Brill, 2003. (ISBN 900-41-3089-6)
- The End of the Alpha-Text of Esther. Translation and Narrative Technique in MT 8:1-17, LXX 8:1-17, and AT 7:14-41. Atlanta: Society of Biblical Literature, 2000. (ISBN 088-41-4033-4)

== Bibliography ==
- Sabine Bieberstein; Kornélia Buday; Ursula Rapp, eds. (2006). Brücken Bauen in Einem Vielgestaltigen Europa. Jahrbuch der Europäischen Gesellschaft für die Theologische Forschung von Frauen, European Society of Women in Theological Research. Peeters Publishers. ISBN 9789042918955.
