= Frank E. Shaw =

American academic

- Born: Frank Edward Shaw
- Education: University of Cincinnati, San Francisco State University, San Diego State University
- Occupations: Writer, biblical scholar, university teacher
- Employers: Ashland University; Ball State University; Earlham College; University of Dayton; University of North Dakota; Wright State University; Xavier University

Frank Edward Shaw is a retired professor and the originator of the theory that there was no single original form of writing of the name of God in the Greek Bible, instead of Ιαω, transliterations in square Hebrew characters, in paleo-Hebrew characters, Greek characteres ΠΙΠΙ, Θεὀς or, contrary to the more common opinion, of an original κύριος.

== Life ==
=== Education ===
In 1985, Shaw earned a Bachelor of Arts degree from San Diego State University. In 1990, he earned a Master of Arts degree from San Francisco State University. As of 2002, Shaw holds a Doctor of Philosophy degree from the University of Cincinnati, with the dissertation The Earliest Non-mystical Jewish Use of Iαω, under the tutelage of Getzel Cohen.

=== Teaching ===
Shaw is currently a retired professor. He previously taught at the University of North Dakota, Ball State University, Xavier University in Cincinnati, St. Francis Xavier University, the University of Dayton, Earlham College, Wright State University, and Ashland University.

== Views ==
Frank demonstrated that the trigramaton ιαω was widely used among Jews of the Second Temple period and early Christians in the era before the First Council of Nicaea. Shaw also establishes that the ιαω was used by the Jews up to the common era, and that there is no single original form of the Tetragrammaton in the Septuagint, focusing primarily on refuting the originality of Kurios held by Albert Pietersma, Larry J. Perkins and Martin Rösel. A. R. Meyer states:

Frank Shaw, The Earliest Non-mystical Jewish Use of Iαω (2014), offers a comprehensive assessment of the early history of ιαω, a poorly understood Greek form of the divine name. His study makes a serious contribution to research on the divine name by correcting much of nineteenth and twentieth-century scholarship, but he also offers insights on the methods with which scholars approach the manuscript evidence. In his study, Shaw undermines two peruasive assumptions: (1) that ιαω was a post-Second Temple phenomenon, with relevance primarily in circles enamored with mysticism and magic; and (2) that ιαω was a marginal designation for the Jewish deity, for example, as some scholars have characterized its occurrence in 4QpapLXXLev^{b} (4Q120). Shaw convincingly demonstrates that the name ιαω had a vibrant non-mystical use in the second and first centuries BCE and that knowledge of the name was more widespread than traditionally thought, not only in Egypt but else where in the Mediterranean world. Following his integrative assessment of the evidence for the use and non -use of the divine name, Shaw examines the long-standing debate over the 'original' rendering of the Tetragrammaton in the LXX. He argues that [t]he matter of any (especially single) 'original' form of the divine name in the LXX is too complex, the evidence is too scattered and indefinite, and the various approaches offered for the issue are too simplistic to account for the uses of the divine name as they happened. He makes a compelling case that an either/or framework for understanding the earliest rendering(s) of the divine name in the LXX is historically implausible. The complex and incomplete sources at hand obscure rather than clarify our reconstructions. Shaw's monograph confirms what will likely prove to be the standard view of divine name traditions in early Judaism and also in early Christianity for years to come. Pending new evidence, complexity and diversity are givens in any historical reconstruction. Shaw's efforts were directed, in particular, towards better understanding the Greek form of the divine name. The current study, while informed by Shaw’s approach of integrating all known evidence into our reconstructions, takes additional steps to include not only Greek evidence but also the extensive data from the Aramaic and Hebrew sources of the Second Temple period.

== Works ==
=== Thesis ===
- Shaw, Frank Edward (2002). The Earliest Non-mystical Jewish Use of Iαω (PhD dissertation, University of Cincinnati).

=== Books ===
- Shaw, Frank Edward (2014). The Earliest Non-mystical Jewish Use of Iαω. Contributions to Biblical Exegesis and Theology. Vol. 70. Lovaina: Peeters Publishers. ISBN 978-90-429-2978-4. OCLC 1044478987.

=== Articles ===
- Shaw, Frank Edward (2005-12-19). "Tetragrammaton". In Kessler, Edward; Wenborn, Neil (eds.). A Dictionary of Jewish-Christian Relations. Cambridge University Press. ISBN 9780521826921.
- ——— (2016-10-29). "Tetragrammaton: Western Christians and the Hebrew Name of God. From the Beginnings to the Seventeenth Century. By Robert J. Wilkinson. Pp. xii + 587. (Studies in the History of Christian Traditions, 179.) Leiden and Boston: Brill, 2015. ISBN 978 90 04 28462 3. €199/$277". The Journal of Theological Studies. 67 (2). Oxford University Press (OUP): 759–762. doi:10.1093/jts/flw193. JSTOR 26368358.
- ——— (2018). "Three Developments in New Testament Textual Criticism: Wettlaufer, Houghton and Jongkind(-Williams)". Journal of Greco-Roman Christianity and Judaism. 14: 114–115.
- ——— (2018). "The transition of law from non-mystical to mystical use and its implications for scholarship". Biblische Notizenthis. 176: 65–87.

== Sources ==
- Becking, Bob (2016). "Review of Frank Shaw, The Earliest Non-Mystical Jewish Use of Ιαω". Theologische Literaturzeitung (11).
- Farnes, Alan Taylor; Runia, David T.; Mackie, Scott D., eds. (2022-05-20). "Notes on Contributors". Ancient Texts, Papyri, and Manuscripts. Studies in Honor of James R. Royse. Brill. ISBN 9789004465732.
- Fontaine, Didier Mickaël (2014). English Review of F. Shaw, The Earliest Non-Mystical Jewish Use of Ιαω.
- Meyer, Anthony R. (2016). "Review: Shaw, Frank, The Earliest Non-Mystical Jewish Use of Ιαω (Contributions to Biblical Exegesis and Theology, 70; Leuven/Paris/Walpole, Mass.: Peeters, 2014). Pp. x + 431. Hardcover. €60.00. ISBN 978-90-429-2978-4". Journal of Hebrew Scriptures. 16. doi:10.5508/jhs.2016.v16.r6. ISSN 1203-1542. OCLC 807285611.
- Meyer, Anthony R. (2022-10-10). "YHWH Adrift and the Quest of Modern Scholars". Naming God in Early Judaism: Aramaic, Hebrew, and Greek. Studies in Cultural Contexts of the Bible. Vol. 2. Brill I Schoeningh. pp. 17–52. doi:10.30965/9783657703500_003. ISBN 978-3-657-70350-0.
- Kessler, Edward; Wenborn, Neil, eds. (2005). "List of contributors". A Dictionary of Jewish-Christian Relations. New York: Cambridge University Press. ISBN 978-0-521-82692-1.
- Rösel, Martin (2018). "The Reading and Translation of the Divine Name in the Masoretic Tradition and the Greek Pentateuch – with an Appendix: Frank Shaw's Book on ΙΑΩ". Tradition and Innovation: English and German Studies on the Septuagint. Septuagint and Cognate Studies. Vol. 70. SBL Press. pp. 291–315. ISBN 9780884143246.
- Runia, D. T. (2011). "20291. F. Shaw, The Earliest Non-mystical Jewish Use of Iαω (diss. University of Cincinnati 2002).". Philo of Alexandria: An Annotated Bibliography 1997-2006. Supplements to Vigiliae Christianae : texts and studies of early Christian life and language. Vol. 109. BRILL. ISBN 9789004210806.
- Troxel, Ronald L. (2016). "F. Shaw, The Earliest Non-Mystical Jewish Use of Ιαω (Contributions to Biblical Exegesis and Theology; Leuven: Peeters, 2015)". Henoch. 38 (1): 128–131.
