= 4Q121 =

Biblical artifact

4Q121 (according to the old system as: 4QLXXNum^{b} gr, Rahlfs 803) is a Septuagint manuscript written on parchment (made of animal skin), dated to the 1st century BCE or CE. The scroll contains fragments of the biblical Book of Numbers 3:40-43; 4:5-16. It was found in Qumran in Cave 4. This fragment is also numbered 803 in the list of manuscripts of the Septuagint by Alfred Rahlfs. The manuscript has been assigned palaeographically between 30 BCE and 68 CE.

== Description ==
This manuscript comprises 23 fragments and three columns.

=== Version ===
The text has affinity toward Hebrew Pentateuch, which, according to Robert J. Wilkinson, may be considered a kaige recension of the Greek Scriptures.

=== Treatment to the God's name ===
P. W. Skehan claims that the "reconstruction, spacing would seem to allow either κυριος [Kyrios] or יהוה [YHWH], whereas ιαω (Iaō, Greek for "Yah") as in pap4QLXXLevb and the (Christian) abbreviation ΚϹ [kappa-sigma] would be too short.”

== History ==
The manuscript was published and described in 1992 by Patrick Skehan in Qumran cave 4.4 (Discoveries in the Judaean desert 9). The old sign of the scroll indicates that it was found in the cave 4, which is the manuscript of the LXX or Septuagint, containing the contents of the Book of Numbers.

== Actual location ==
This manuscript is kept at the Rockefeller Museum in Jerusalem (Gr. 265 [4Q121]).

== See also ==
- List of the Dead Sea Scrolls

== Bibliography ==
- Skehan, Patrick W.; Ulrich, Eugene Charles; Sanderson, Judith E.; et al. (Peter J. Parsons) (1992). Qumran Cave 4. Palaeo-Hebrew and Greek Manuscripts Biblical. Discoveries in the Judaean Desert. Vol. 9. Oxford: Clarendon Press. pp. 187–194, no. 121. ISBN 9780198263289.
