= 4Q120 =

Biblical manuscript dating to the first century BCE

- Rockefeller Archeological Museum
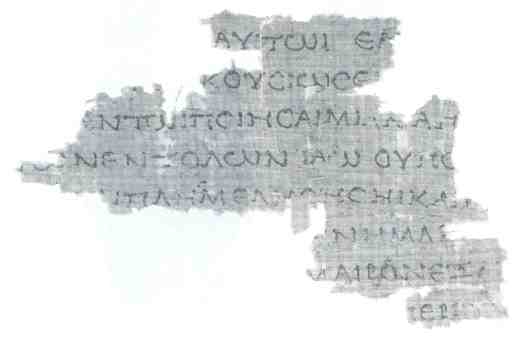
- 4Q120, fragment 20, 1st-century BCE, showing portions of verses 26 through 28 of Leviticus 4
- Also known as: pap4QLXXLev^{b}
- Type: Scroll, Septuagint manuscript
- Date: 1st-century BCE (Hasmonean period)
- Language: Koine Greek
- Scribe: Professional scribe
- Author: Unknown
- Material: Papyrus
- Format: Parchment on scroll
- Condition: Too fragmented
- Script: Uncial, scripto continua
- Contents: Book of Leviticus
- Exemplar: Septuagint
- Previously kept: Palestine Archaeological Museum
- Discovered: Cave No. 4 Nahal Hever
- Accession: The Leon Levy Dead Sea Scrolls Digital Library
- Other: This manuscript is notable for its antiquity, its witness to an early form of the original Septuagint, and its preservation of the Trigrammaton rendered as Ιαω.

The manuscript 4Q120 (also pap4QLXXLev^{b}; AT22; VH 46; Rahlfs 802; LDAB 3452) is a Septuagint manuscript (LXX) of the biblical Book of Leviticus written on papyrus, found at Qumran. The Rahlfs-No. is 802. Paleographically it dates from the first century BCE. Currently the manuscript is housed in the Rockefeller Museum in Jerusalem.

== History ==
The manuscript was written in the Hasmonean period, and Patrick W. Skehan dated 4Q120 to "late first century BCE or opening years of the first century CE". The manuscript was found at Qumran, Cave 4b. Cave 4 was discovered in August 1952, and was excavated on 22–29 September 1952 by Gerald Lankester Harding, Roland de Vaux, and Józef Milik.

== Description ==
This scroll is in a very fragmented condition. Today it consists of 97 fragments. However, only 31 of those fragments can be reasonably reconstructed and deciphered, allowing for a reading of Leviticus 1.11 through 5.25; the remaining fragments are too small to allow for reliable identification. Additionally, space bands are occasionally used for the separation of concepts, and divisions within the text. A special sign (⌐) for separation of paragraphs is found fragment 27, between the lines 6 and 7. While the later divisions would label these verses 5:20-26, it appears to testify to a classical transition from chapter 5 to 6. Scriptio continua is used throughout.

=== Version ===
Emanuel Tov agrees with Eugene Ulrich that "4QLXXNum is a superior representative of the Old Greek text than LXX^{Gö}." Albert Pietersma says that "the genuinely Septuagintal credentials of 4QLXXLevb are well-nigh impeccable." Within what he called "limited scope of evidence", Patrick W. Skehan describes it "as a considerable reworking of the original LXX to make it conform both in quantity and in diction to a Hebrew consonantal text nearly indistinguishable [...] from that of MT." According to Wilkinson, 4Q120 "is an irreproachably Septuagint text from the 1st century B.C. which bears no trace of having been subsequently conformed to the Hebrew text".

=== God's name ΙΑŌ ===
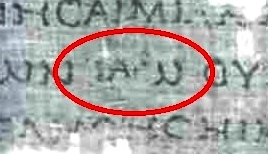
Detail: the Divine Name in verse 27

Apart from minor variants, the main interest of the text lies in its use of ΙΑΩ (Iaō) to translate the tetragrammaton in Leviticus 3:12 (frg. 6) and 4:27 (frg. 20). The presence of the name of God in this ancient manuscript has supported the conclusion of some scholars that ΙΑΩ was the original form in the Septuagint. Skehan, Tov and Ulrich agrees that "this writing of the divine name is more original than Κύριος". Meyer states that the fact that ΙΑΩ appears with the same script in the fragments indicates that the same scribe wrote the name, and does not support Johann Lust of an original Κύριος.

Skehan suggests that, in the Septuagint version of the Pentateuch, Ιαω is more original than the κύριος (Kyrios, "Lord") of editions based on later manuscripts, and he assumes that, in the books of the prophets, the Septuagint did use κύριος to translate both יהוה (the tetragrammaton) and אדני (Adonai), the word that traditionally replaced the tetragrammaton when reading aloud.

Emanuel Tov claims the use here of Ιαω as proof that the "papyrus represents an early version of the Greek scripture" antedating the text of the main manuscripts. He states that "the writing of the Tetragrammaton in Hebrew characters in Greek revisional texts is a relatively late phenomenon. On the basis of the available evidence, the analysis of the original representation of the Tetragrammaton in Greek Scriptures therefore focuses on the question of whether the first translators wrote either κύριος or Ιαω." Tov wrote: "this papyrus represents an early version of Greek Scripture, as shown by several unusual renderings, including the transliteration of the Tetragrammaton as Ιαω, instead of its translation as κύριος in the later Christian manuscripts of the Septuagint. 4QpapLXXLev^{b} probably reflects a version antedating the text of the main manuscript tradition of the LXX".

Kristin De Troyer argues that ΙΑΩ is likely a Greek transcription of the Hebrew form יהו (Yahu) and that its presence in the first-century BCE manuscript 4Q120 and other Greek transcriptions, indicates that this form of the divine name was pronounced in some Jewish circles at that time. Frank E. Shaw says that "the appearance of Ιαω in 4Q120, roundly judged a good, third century B.C.E. exemplar of the LXX of Leviticus 1-5, evinces that some early Septuagintal manuscripts used Ιαω to represent the Tetragram (p. 33)." According to Shaw:

"The Second Temple Ιαω users probably represent a variety of social classes, not simply the lower class. The evidence for this position includes the scribe/translator of 4Q120, the educated users of the onomastica (surely lower-class Jews would have no need for onomastica), and more broadly, if we include Jews who used a similar pronounced form of the name Ιαω, attention should be given to the documentary, diplomatic, and priestly uses of YHH/YHW at Elephantine, the liturgical use of YH[W] in P. Amherst 63, and the administrative context of the Idumean ("House of YHW") Ostracon."

According to Meyer, 4Q127 ("though technically not a Septuagint manuscript, perhaps a paraphrase of Exodus or an apocalyptic work") appears to have two occurrences of Ιαω. The Codex Marchalianus gives Ιαω, not as a part of the Scripture text, but instead in marginal notes on Ezekiel 1:2 and 11:1, as in several other marginal notes it gives ΠΙΠΙ.

Pavlos D. Vasileiadis proposes that the appearance of the theonym "Iao" in the ancient Greek manuscript 4QpapLXXLev^{b} stems from a Hellenizing cultural influence rather than a traditional re-Hebraizing practice. While the Hebrew Bible defines a distinct profile for God, Hellenistic Greek and Latin texts used "Iao" within syncretic contexts to describe a supreme deity or divine emanation. Challenging prevailing Septuagint theories, the author argues that this specific choice of the Tetragrammaton reflects Greek integration, a practice supported by evidence of early Christian writers copying and circulating manuscripts containing the name "Iao" for several centuries.

== Translation ==
=== Greek text, transliteration and translation ===
Text according to A. R. Meyer:

Lev 4:27

[αφεθησεται ]αυτωι εαν[ δε ψυχη μια]
[αμαρτ]η[ι α]κουσιως εκ[ του λαου της]
[γης ]εν τωι ποιησαι μιαν απ[ο πασων]
των εντολων ιαω ου πο[ιηθησε]

Lev 3:12–13

[τωι ιαω] ^{12} εαν δ[ε απο των αιγων]
[το δωρ]ον αυτο[υ και προσαξει εν]
[αντι ι]αω ^{13} και ε[πιθησει τας χει]

Romanization of Meyer:

Lev 4:27

[aphethēsetai ]autōi ean[ de psychē mia]
[hamart]ē[i a]kousiōs ek[ tou laou tēs]
[gēs ]en tōi poiēsai mian ap[o pasōn]
tōn entolōn iaō hou po[iēthēse]

Lev 3:12–13

[tōi iaō] ^{12} ean d[e apo tōn aigōn]
[to dōr]on auto[u kai prosaxei en]
[anti i]aō ^{13} kai e[pithēsei tas chei]

NIV:

Lev 4:27

he will be forgiven. If any member of the community
sins unintentionally and does
what is forbidden in any of the LORD’s
commands, when they realize...

Lev 3:12–13

...to the LORD. If your offering is
a goat, you are to present
it before the LORD, lay your hand...

=== Bible translations ===
The New World Translation of the Holy Scriptures—With References justifies restoring the God's name instead of using the surrogate 'LORD' in Leviticus 3:12 and 4:27, relying on footnotes that cite the support of manuscript 4Q120.

== Bibliography ==
- Aune, David Edward (2006). Apocalypticism, Prophecy and Magic in Early Christianity: Collected Essays. Mohr Siebeck. p. 363. ISBN 3-16-149020-7.
- De Troyer, Kristin (2006). "The Choice is Yours! On Names of God". In Bieberstein, Sabine; Buday, Kornélia; Rapp, Ursula (eds.). Brücken Bauen in Einem Vielgestaltigen Europa. Jahrbuch der Europäischen Gesellschaft für Theologische Forschung von Frauen: European Society of Women in Theological Research, Jahrbuch der Europäischen Gesellschaft für die Theologische Forschung von Frauen, European Society of Women in Theological Research, Journal of the European Society of Women in Theological Research. Vol. 14. Peeters Publishers. pp. 60–61. ISBN 9042918950.
- Metzger, Bruce Manning (1981). Manuscripts of the Greek Bible: An Introduction to Greek Palaeography. Oxford University Press. p. 35. ISBN 9780195029246.
- Meyer, Anthony R. (2016-01-01). "Review of Shaw, Frank, The Earliest Non-Mystical Jewish Use of Ιαω (Contributions to Biblical Exegesis and Theology, 70; Leuven/Paris/Walpole, MA: Peeters, 2014)". Journal of Hebrew Scriptures. 16. doi:10.5508/jhs.2016.v16.r6. ISSN 1203-1542.
- Meyer, Anthony R. (2017). The Divine Name in Early Judaism: Use and Non-Use in Aramaic, Hebrew, and Greek (Thesis). McMaster University. hdl:11375/22823.
- Meyer, Anthony R. (2022). Naming God in Early Judaism: Aramaic, Hebrew, and Greek. Studies in Cultural Contexts of the Bible. Vol. 2. Brill I Schoeningh. ISBN 978-3-657-70350-0.
- Milik, Józef (1957). "Dix ans de découverte dans le désert de Juda". Discoveries in the Judaean Desert.
- Milik, Józef (1976). "Black M.". The Books of Enoch: Aramaic Fragments Qumran Cave 4.
- New World Bible Translation Committee (1984). New World Translation of the Holy Scriptures—With References. Watch Tower Bible and Tract Society.
- Pietersma, Albert; Cox, Claude E.; Wevers, John William (1984). "Kyrios or Tetragram: A Renewed Quest for the Original LXX". In Albert Pietersma; John William Wevers (eds.). De Septuaginta: Studies in Honour of John William Wevers on His Sixty-Fifth Birthday (PDF). Mississauga, Ont., Canada: Benben Publications. ISBN 0920808107. OCLC 11446028.
- Ross, William A.; Glenny, W. Edward (2021-01-14). T&T Clark Handbook of Septuagint Research. T&T Clark Handbooks. Bloomsbury Publishing. ISBN 9780567680266.
- Rösel, Martin (2018). Tradition and Innovation: English and German Studies on the Septuagint. SBL Press. p. 295. ISBN 9780884143246.
- Skehan, Patrick W. (1957-06-02). "The Qumran Manuscripts and Textual Criticism". In Anderson, G. W.; Cazzelles, Henri; De Boer, P. A. H.; E. Hammershaimb, E.; Burrows, Millar; Noth, Martin (eds.). Volume du Congrès International pour l'étude de l'Ancien Testament, Strasbourg 1956. Supplements to Vetus Testamentum. Vol. 4. Leiden: Brill Publishers. pp. 148–160. doi:10.1163/9789004275270_012.
- Skehan, Patrick W. (1980). "The Divine Name at Qumran in the Masada Scroll and in the Septuagint" (PDF). Bulletin of the International Organization for Septuagint and Cognate Studies. 13. The Catholic University of America: 14–44. ISSN 0145-3890.
- Tov, Emanuel (2008). "Chapter 23: The Greek Biblical Texts from the Judean Desert". Hebrew Bible, Greek Bible and Qumran: Collected Essays (PDF). Texts and Studies in Ancient Judaism. Vol. 121. Mohr Siebeck. pp. 339–364. doi:10.1628/978-3-16-151454-8. ISBN 978-3-16-151454-8.
- Troxel, Ronald L. (2016). "F. Shaw, The Earliest Non-Mystical Jewish Use of Ιαω (Contributions to Biblical Exegesis and Theology; Leuven: Peeters, 2015)". Henoch. 38 (1): 128–131. ISSN 0393-6805.
- Schiffman, Lawrence H.; VanderKam, James C. (2000). Encyclopedia of the Dead Sea Scrolls: N-Z. Encyclopedia of the Dead Sea Scrolls, Lawrence H. Schiffman, ISBN 0195084500, 9780195084504. Vol. 2. Oxford University Press. ISBN 9780195137972.
- Ulrich, Eugene (1992). 120. pap4QLXXLeviticus^{b} in: Discoveries in the Judean Desert: IX. Qumran Cave 4. Vol. IV. Oxford: Clarendon Press. pp. 167–186. ISBN 0-19-826328-7.
- Ulrich, Eugene (1992). "The Septuagint Manuscripts from Qumran: A Reappraisal of Their Value". Septuagint, Scrolls, and Cognate Writings. By George J. Brooke; Barnabas Lindars. 33. Atlanta: Scholars Press. pp. 49–80.
- VanderKam, James C. (1994). The Dead Sea Scrolls Today. Grand Rapids: Eerdmans.
- Vasileiadis, Pavlos D. (2013). "The pronunciation of the sacred Tetragrammaton: An overview of a nomen revelatus that became a nomen absconditus" (PDF). Judaica Ukrainica. 2. National University of Kyiv-Mohyla Academy.
- Vasileiadis, Pavlos D. (2014). "Aspects of rendering the sacred Tetragrammaton in Greek". Open Theology. 1 (1). Berlin, Germany: De Gruyter: 56–88. doi:10.2478/opth-2014-0006. ISSN 2300-6579. OCLC 927128789.
- Vasileiadis, Pavlos D. (2017). "The god Iao and his connection with the Biblical God, with special emphasis on the manuscript 4QpapLXXLevb" [Ο θεός Ιαώ και η σχέση του με τον Βιβλικό Θεό, με ιδιαίτερη εστίαση στο χειρόγραφο 4QpapLXXLevb]. Vetus Testamentum et Hellas. 4. Aristotle University of Thessaloniki, Greece: School of Pastoral and Social Theology: 48–51. ISSN 2459-2552. OCLC 1085412017.
- Vasileiadis, Pavlos D. (2018). "Jesus, the New Testament, and the sacred Tetragrammaton" [Ο Ιησούς, η Καινή Διαθήκη και το ιερό Τετραγράμματο]. Synthesis.
- Vasileiadis, Pavlos D.; Gordon, Nehemia (2019). "Transmission of the Tetragrammaton in Judeo-Greek and Christian Sources" [Η Μεταβίβαση του Τετραγράμματου στις Ιουδαιο-Ελληνικές και Χριστιανικές Πηγές]. Accademia: Revue de la Société Marsile Ficin. 18. ISSN 1296-7645. OCLC 43343733.
- Wilkinson, Robert J. (2015-02-05). Tetragrammaton: Western Christians and the Hebrew Name of God: From the Beginnings to the Seventeenth Century. Studies in the History of Christian Traditions. Vol. 179. Leiden: Koninklijke Brill B. V. doi:10.1163/9789004288171. ISBN 978-90-04-28817-1.
