= 4Q127 =

Part of the Dead Sea Scrolls

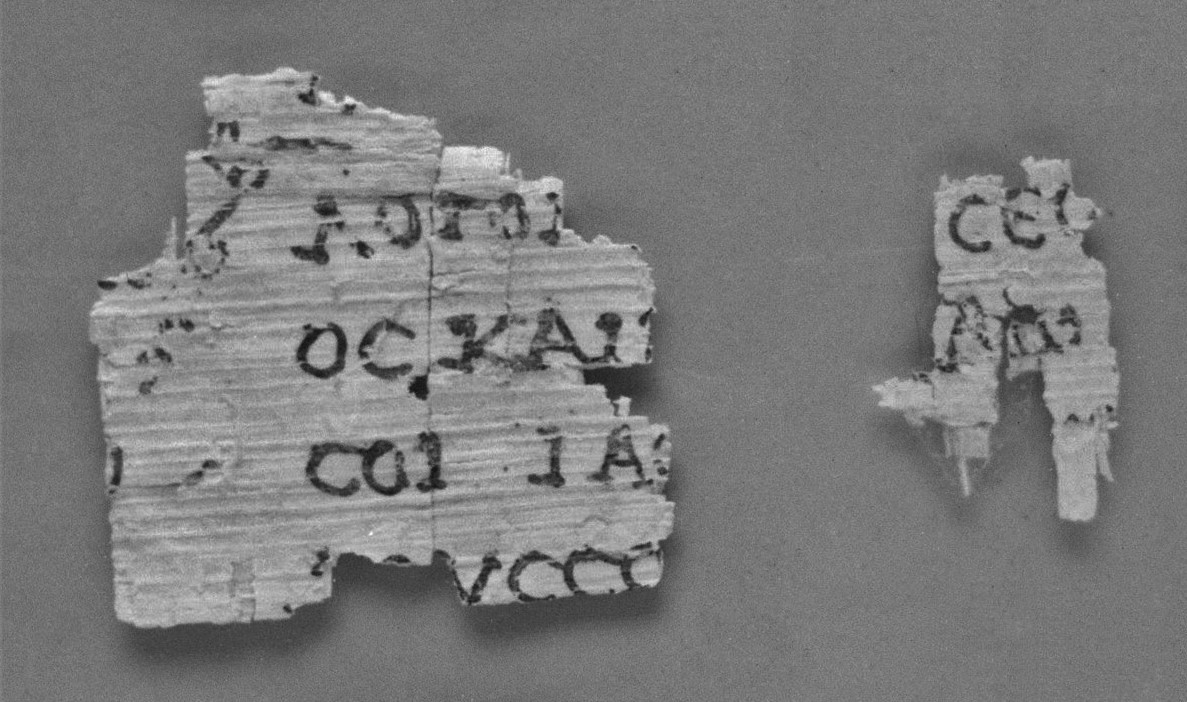
- 4Q127, a paraphrase of Exodus
- Also known as: 4Qpap paraExod gr, TM 69054, LDAB 10345
- Type: Manuscript
- Date: 1st-century BCE (Hasmonean period)
- Language(s): Koine Greek
- Material: Papyrus
- Condition: Very fragmented
- Script: Uncial, scripto continua
- Contents: Unknown, Paraphrase of Exodus?
- Discovered: Qumran (Cave No. 4)

The manuscript 4Q127 (4Qpap paraExod gr, TM 69054, LDAB 10345) is one of the Dead Sea Scrolls. It is probably a paraphrase of Exodus according to the Septuagint (LXX) of the biblical Book of Leviticus, found at Qumran (Cave No. 4). The Rahlfs-No. is 802. Palaeographically it dates from the first century BC. Currently the manuscript is housed in the Rockefeller Museum in Jerusalem.

== Description ==
According to Devorah Dimant, the manuscript "4Q127 is not biblical, but contain some other texts". She also says that "4Q127 was labeled by the editor a paraphrase of Exous. Elsewhere, I have suggested that 4Q127 is, in fact, an apocryphal work with a visionary recapitulation of history".

Anthony R. Meyer states:

4Qpap paraExod gr (4Q127) dates to the first century BCE or early first century CE and appears to be a paraphrase of Exodus. It comprises about 10 legible fragments and another 68 fragments, each with only a few letters. The scribal hand is very similar to 4Q120. There is no clear evidence for how the divine name was written, although two fragments preserve letters that may be read as ιαω.

== Bibliography ==
- Charlesworth, James H., ed. (2006). The Bible and the Dead Sea Scrolls: Scripture and the scrolls. Baylor University Press. p. 467. ISBN 9781932792195.
- Dimant, Devorah (2014). "Apocrypha and Pseudepigrapha at Qumran". History, Ideology and Bible Interpretation in the Dead Sea Scrolls: Collected Studies. Forschungen zum Alten Testament. Vol. 90. Mohr Siebeck. ISBN 9783161510212.
- Meyer, Anthony R. (2017). The Divine Name in Early Judaism: Use and Non-Use in Aramaic, Hebrew, and Greek (PDF). Ph.D. thesis, University of Cincinnati.
- Skehan, Ulrich, Sanderson 1992. DJD 9: 223–242.
