= Ambrosiano O 39 sup. =

Greek manuscript of the Septuagint

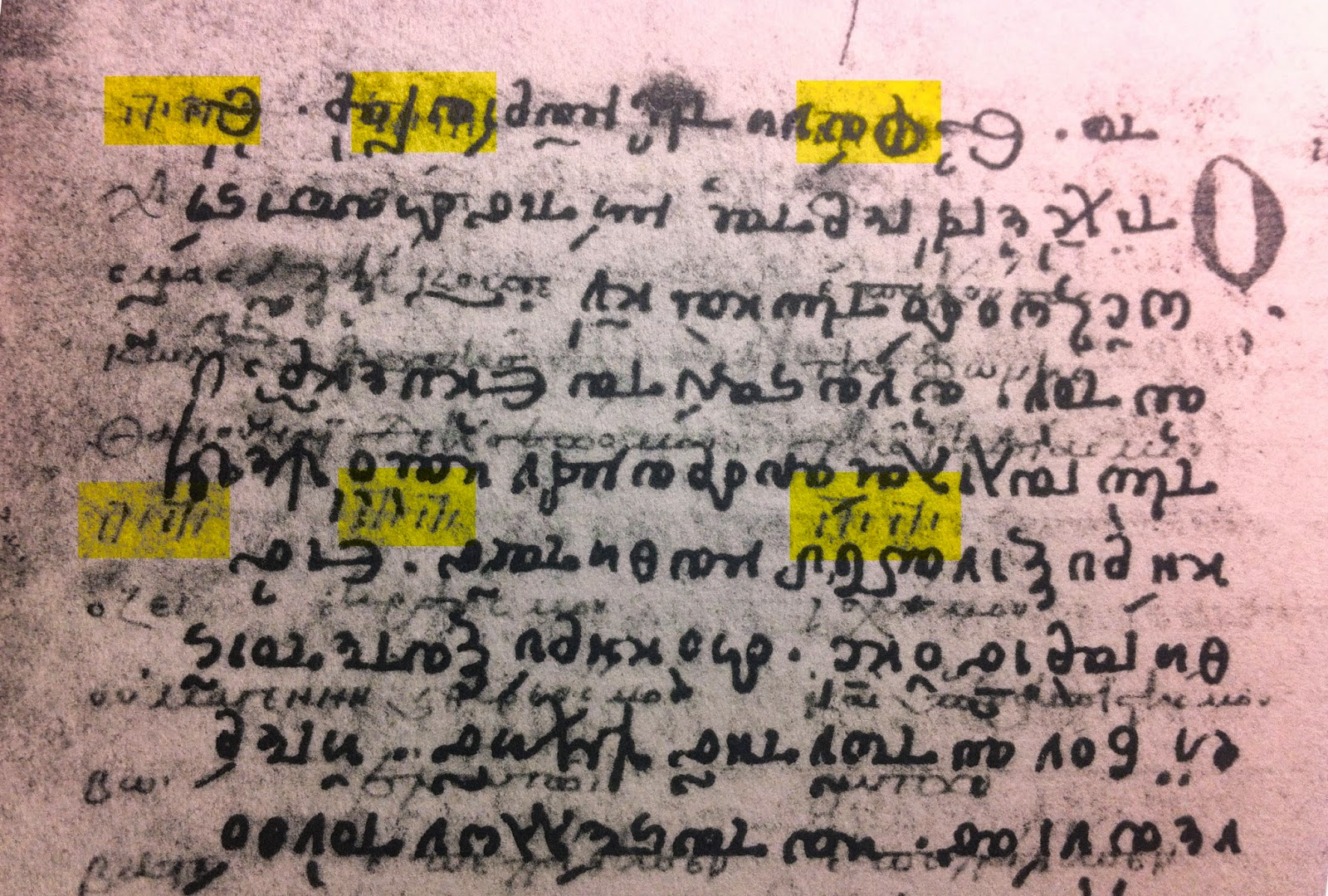
Presence of the name YHWH in the Ambrosiano O39 sup.

The ms. Ambrosiano O 39 sup. is a manuscript of the Hexapla of Origen dated to the late ninth century C.E. written in a codex form. This is a palimpsest, meaning that the current text is written on leaves which had been written on before and cleaned.

The manuscript is designated with the number 1098 in the list of the septuagint manuscripts as the classification of Alfred Rahlfs and with the number 587 in Emidio Martini and Domenico Bassi's catalogue of the Greek manuscripts in the Biblioteca Ambrosiana.

== Description ==
The palimpsest contains about 150 verses of the Psalms.

The codex is written in five columns per page, unlike other portions of the Hexapla it does not contain one column written in Hebrew language. The first column is a sequential transliteration from the Hebrew to Greek text, in the second probably a translation of Aquila, the third is a version of Symmachus, the fourth contain a text of the Septuaginta and the fifth column contains the Greek version of Quinta.

This is the latest known manuscript that has the Septuagint text with the tetragrammaton. The tetragrammaton occur in square Hebrew characters in all the five columns in the following places within the Book of Psalms: 18:30, 31, 41, 46; 28:6,7,8; 29:1 (x2), 2 (x2), 3 (x2); 30:1, 2, 4, 7, 8, 10, 10, 12; 31:1, 5, 6, 9, 21, 23 (x2), 24; 32:10, 11; 35:1, 22, 24, 27; 36:5; 46:7, 8, 11; 89:49 (in the columns 1, 2 and 4), 51, 52.

== History ==
A facsimile and a textual transcription was published in 1958 by Giovanni Mercati in a publication entitled: Psalterii Hexapli Reliquiae... Pars prima. Codex Rescriptus Bybliothecae Ambrosianae O 39 sup. Phototypice Expressus et Transcriptus.

== Location ==
The manuscript is kept in the Biblioteca Ambrosiana, located at Milan (O. 39 sup.).

== See also ==
- TS 12.182

== Bibliography ==
- Metzger, Bruce Manning (1981). Manuscripts of the Greek Bible: an introduction to Greek palaeography. New York: Oxford University Press. pp. 108, 109. ISBN 0-19-502924-0.
