= Wanda Reisel =

Dutch writer

Wanda Daniela Reisel Muller (born in Willemstad, Curaçao, on November 24, 1955) is a Dutch writer. Reisel was awarded the Anna Bijns Prize and her works has been nominated for other awards.

== Life ==
She is the daughter of Jacques Jacob Hirsch Reisel (1915-1976) and Emma Henny Elisabeth Reisel-Muller (1921-2002). She is Max Reisel's niece. Her Jewish parents had emigrated to Willemstad island in 1948 for fear of the Cold War and returned to Amsterdam in 1960 and she grew up in Amsterdam in an anarcho-liberal doctors' family with six children (father internist, mother nurse).

After elementary school (1968-1974) Reisel briefly studied history, and after a year and a half she enrolled in the directing course at the drama school, at Stage Directing at Amsterdamse Hogeschool voor de Kunsten. She knew from an early age that she wanted to become a writer. She completed this training in 1981. Since then she has written a dozen plays, collected under the title Tien stuks. Her first published novel is Het blauwe uur (The Blue Hour, translated in German as Die Blaue Stunde).

In addition to prose and drama, Reisel also writes film and television scripts and radio plays. Reisel has been a good friend of Herman Koch for many years.

== Awards ==
Reisel made her debut as a prose writer in 1986 with Jacobi's tocht (two novellas). Her first novel Het blauwe uur appeared in 1988. She became known to a wider audience in 1997 thanks to the nomination of Baby Storm (1996) for the Libris Literature Prize. Her next novel, Een man een man (2000), was also shortlisted for the Libris Literature Prize, in 2001. The novel Witte liefde was nominated for the AKO Literature Prize and was awarded the Anna Bijns Prize. Her theater plays have been performed by Toneelgroep Baal and Discordia, and directed by Gerardjan Rijnders among others.
