= Papyrus Vindobonensis Graecus 39777 =

The Papyrus Vindobonensis Graecus 39777 signed as Sym^{P.Vindob.G.39777} is a fragment of a Greek manuscript of the Psalms of the translation of Symmachus. It was written on papyrus in a scroll form. The papyrus contains fragments of Psalm 69 and Psalm 81 (as the numeration of the Septuagint is Psalms 68 and 80). The P.Vindob.G.39777 is dated to late third century or beginning fourth century AD. This manuscript probably comes from Faiyum in Egypt.

== History ==
It was published by Dr. Karl Wessely in his work Studien zur Palaeographie und Papyruskunde, Vol. XI., Leipzig, 1911, p. 171.

== Description ==
The manuscript probably originally contained large portions of the Book of Psalms. The translation of Symmachus was a part of the Hexapla and Tetrapli, the work contains the translations of the Hebrew to Greek Bible, it was written by Origen. According to Bruce M. Metzger, the Greek translation of Hebrew Bible prepared by Symmachus was realised with a different method that the translation of Aquila, because his intention was not a literal translation, rather an elegant message from the Hebrew to Greek text.

=== Tegragrammaton ===
The papyrus contains the tetragrammaton written in archaic Hebrew characters in Ps 69:13, 30 and 31.

== Location ==
The Papyrus Vindobonensis Graecus 39777 is kept at the Papyrus Collection of the Austrian National Library at Vienna ('Vindobonensis' is Latin for 'from Vienna') as (P. Vindob. G. 39777).
