= Taylor-Schechter 12.182 =

7th-century manuscript of Origen's Hexapla

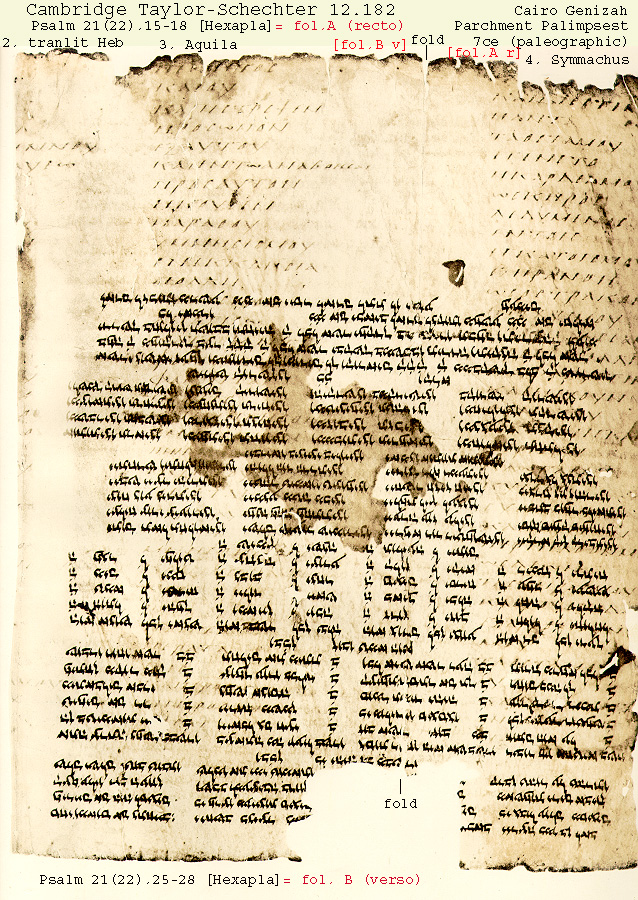
Taylor-Schechter 12.182

The siglum Taylor-Schechter 12.182 (T-S 12.182; also referenced as TM nr. 62326; LDAB id: 3490; Rahlfs 2005) designates a manuscript written on parchment in codex form. This is a palimpsest of a copy of Origen's work called the Hexapla. The manuscript is dated to 7th-century AD, and is the oldest of the hexapla manuscripts. The hexapla was completed before 240 AD.

== History ==
The fragments comes from Egypt, were published by C. Taylor in his work Hebrew-Greek Cairo Genizah Palimpsests, Cambridge, 1900, pp. 54–65.

== Description ==
This is palimpsest in codex form written on parchment. It contains Psalms 22 (LXX 21): 15-18 fol. A recto, 19-24 and 25-28 fol. B verso, and the middle columns, 2-5 columns of the Hexapla.

== Tetragrammaton ΠΙΠΙ ==
The manuscript is written in koine Greek, and the divine name is notable, it contains the tetragrammaton in Greek characters "Pipi" (ΠΙΠΙ). According to Jerome, some septuagint manuscripts had the Divine Name written in this way. Jerome mentions that some Greek manuscripts contain the Hebrew letters for YHWH (yodh he waw he; יהוה), and that this could mislead some Greek readers to read YHWH as PIPI (ΠΙΠΙ; pi iota pi iota), since Hebrew YHWH (written right to left) looks like Greek PIPI (written left to right). According to Pavlos D. Vasileiadis and Nehemiah Gordon, the manuscript has "the nomen sacrum κ[ύριε] with a supralinear Hebrew yod for יהוה (YHWH), followed by πιπι. This transitional combination represents the Tetragrammaton in Ps 22:20 [LXX 21:20] in three separate ways in the Septuagint column of Origen’s Hexapla, preserved in a palimpsest in the Cairo Genizah."

== Actual location ==
Today it is kept at the Library of the University of Cambridge as a part of the Taylor-Schechter Cairo Genizah Collection (Cambridge University Library T-S 12.182).

== See also ==
- Septuagint manuscripts
- Ambrosiano O 39 sup.
- Hexapla

== Sources ==
- Taylor, Charles (1900). Hebrew-Greek Cairo Genizatt Palimpsests from the Taylor-Schechter Collection including a Fragment of the Twenty Second Psalm According to the Origen's Hexapla. Cambridge University Press.
