= Max Reisel =

Dutch semiticist and teacher

- Born: Max Reisel; 25 April 1913
- Died: 26 January 1989
- Education: University of Amsterdam
- Occupation: University teacher
- Employer: Montessori Lyceum Rotterdam
- Notable work: The Mysterious name of Y.H.W.H. The Tetragrammaton in connection with the names of Ehyeh ašer Ehyeh - Hūhā and Šem Hamm℮phôraš

Max Reisel (Amsterdam, April 25, 1913 - Jerusalem, 1989) was a Dutch semiticist (of Jewish descent) and a teacher at the Montessori Lyceum Rotterdam. He strove in the dissemination of knowledge about Judaism in general and Hebrew language in particular. He played an important role in the field of education in the Netherlands.

== Life ==
M. Reisel was born on April 25, 1913, in Amsterdam. Reisel was the son of Wolf Pinchas Reisel (1881–1943), a well-known chief Hazzan of the Neie Sjoel (New Synagogue in Amsterdam), and Sonja Wigdorowitz (1884–1943). They would eventually have eight children, namely; Barend (1908–1943), Lilly (1909–1945), Slata (1910, died shortly after birth), Ellie (1911–1999), Max himself, Jacques (1915–1976), Rudolf (1920–1998) and Mirjam (1925–1943).

In his youth, Max attended Hendrik Wester School, a public school on Weesperplein.

He later became department chairman of the Jewish Youth Organization and wrote a thesis on its guidelines.

In 1930, Reisel began his teacher training in Amsterdam. He was still rejected for military service in 1932, and in 1937 he passed the examination for Israel's religious headteacher position, but he was not able to do so.

=== War years ===
Reisel continued his studies, graduating in pedagogy in 1941 and Dutch language and literature in 1942, but Reisel would not practice teaching until after the war, and would not be able to do so until the war ended.

Max Reisel married Clara Frederika Levie (1920–2000) during the war, in 1942, This followed Jewish tradition: the chuppah took place at his parents' home. Max had a daughter with Clara, the same year he became a cultural contributor to Het Joodsch Weekblad.

He applied to be on the Barneveld list during the war, but had been rejected, though his brother Jacques, though then only a simple physician's assistant, did get on that list, yet Max survived the war. Of his parental family, besides himself, only his sister Rachel (Ellie) and brothers Jacques and Rudolf eventually survived the war. Both parents, his brother Barend (Benno) and his sisters Lina (Lilly) and Mirjam perished in the Holocaust, and they were all killed.

=== After the war ===
In 1946, Reisel became a teacher of Dutch at the Montessori Lyceum in Rotterdam. From 1946 to 1964 he was secretary of the Nederlands-Israëlitische Gemeente and a member of the central education committee of the Nederlands Israëlitisch Kerkgenootschap (NIK).

Reisel also studied Semitic languages and received his Ph.D. in Literature and Philosophy from the University of Amsterdam in 1957, with the thesis Observations on אהיה אשר אהיה, הואהא and שם המפורש, or Observations on the Tetragrammaton (Observations on Ehyeh aéser ehyeh, Hûhâ and éSēm ham-mefôrāés). This thesis was published that same year in book form with the title The mysterious name of Y.H.W.H. The English translation was done by Henriëtte Boas. Reisel's work is considered one of the most profound studies on the Tetragrammaton by far in 2014.

That same year, the School voor Hebreeuwse Taal- en Letterkunde en Judaïca (School for Hebrew Language and Literature and Judaica) was founded in Rotterdam, which was headed by Reisel from the beginning. The aim of this school was to meet the then growing interest in the Jewish language and literature.

Over the years he wrote several books, including a biography of Maimonides, Judaism in Modern Society, and the translation of the Book of Genesis.

Reisel emigrated to Israel in the late 1970s, where he died on January 26, 1989, in Jerusalem.

== Selected works ==
Reisel wrote several books, including a biography on Maimonides, Judaism in Modern Society and a translation of the Book of Genesis.

=== Thesis ===
- Reisel, Max (1957). Observations on Ehyeh aéser ehyeh, Hûhâ and éSēm ham-mefôrāés (Zugl.: Amsterdam, Univ., PhD Diss.). Assen van Gorcum. OCLC 839780182.

=== Books ===
- Reisel, M. (1957). The mysterious name of Y.H.W.H.: the tetragrammaton in connection with the names of EHYEH ašer EHYEH-Hūhā-and S̈̌em Hammephôrǎs. Studia Semitica Neerlandica. Vol. 2. Assen: Van Gorcum. doi:10.1163/9789004354876. ISBN 9789004354876. OCLC 1276166.
- Reisel, M. (1957). Observations on Eheyeh asher eheyeh. Assen: Van Gorcum, G.A. Hak & Prakke. OCLC 11396285.
- Reisel, M. (1959). Het Jodendom in de moderne samenleving; enige feiten typerend voor het Jodendom in het licht van de herrezen Staat Israël (in Dutch). 's-Gravenhage, L.J.C. Boucher. OCLC 9881539.
- Reisel, M.; Mūsā b ʿUbayd Ibn Maymūn (1963). Maimonides. Helden van de geest. Vol. 30. Den Haag: Kruseman. OCLC 781135612.
- Reisel, M.; Stichting voor Hebreeuwse taal- en letterkunde (Rotterdam) (1966). Genesis = Bere·šît: transcriptie, verklaring, vertaling. Den Haag: Kruseman. OCLC 63413768.

== Varia ==
Max Reisel is uncle of Wanda Reisel, a Dutch writer.
