= Tetragrammaton =

Four-letter name of God in the Tanakh (Hebrew Bible)

The Tetragrammaton in Hebrew letters י (yod/Y) ה (he/H) ו (vav/W) ה (he/H)

The Tetragrammaton (Note: Pronounced /ˌtɛtrəˈɡræmətɒn/; from Ancient Greek τετραγράμματον (tetragrámmaton) '[consisting of] four letters'; also known as the Tetragram.) is the four-letter Hebrew-language theonym יהוה (written 𐤉𐤄𐤅𐤄 in Paleo Hebrew script and transliterated as YHWH), the name of God in the Hebrew Bible. The four Hebrew letters, written and read from right to left, are yod, he, vav, and he. (Note: The word "tetragrammaton" originates from Greek tetra 'four' and gramma (GEN grammatos) 'letter'.) The name may be derived from a verb that means 'to be', 'to exist', 'to cause to become', or 'to come to pass'.

While there is no consensus about the structure and etymology of the name, the form Yahweh (with niqqud: יַהוֶה) is now almost universally accepted among Biblical and Semitic linguistics scholars, (Note: The form Yahweh is also dominant in Christianity, but is not used in Islam or Judaism.) though the vocalization Jehovah continues to have wide usage, primarily in Christian traditions. In modernity, Christianity is the only Abrahamic religion in which the Tetragrammaton is freely and openly pronounced.

The books of the Torah and the rest of the Hebrew Bible except Esther, Ecclesiastes, and (with a possible instance of יה (Jah) in verse 8:6) the Song of Songs contain this Hebrew name.

Observant Jews and those who follow Talmudic Jewish traditions do not pronounce יהוה, nor do they read aloud proposed transcription forms such as Yahweh or Yehovah; instead they replace it with a different term, whether in addressing or in referring to the God of Israel. Common substitutions in Hebrew are אֲדֹנָי (Adonai, lit. transl. 'My Lords', pluralis majestatis taken as singular) or אֱלֹהִים (Elohim, literally 'gods' but treated as singular when meaning "God") in prayer, or הַשֵּׁם (HaShem, 'The Name') in everyday speech.

== Four letters ==
The letters, properly written and read from right to left (in Biblical Hebrew), are:

Hebrew	Letter name	Pronunciation
י	Yod	[j]
ה	He	[h]
ו	Vav	[w] or [v], or placeholder for "O"/"U" vowel (see mater lectionis)
ה	He	[h] (or often a silent letter at the end of a word)

== Etymology ==
The Tetragrammaton in Phoenician (12th century BCE to 150 BCE), Paleo-Hebrew (10th century BCE to 135 CE), and square Hebrew (3rd century BCE to present) scripts

The Hebrew Bible explains it by the formula אֶהְיֶה אֲשֶׁר אֶהְיֶה ('ehye 'ăšer 'ehye pronounced [ʔehˈje ʔaˈʃer ʔehˈje] transl. I Am that I Am), the name of God revealed to Moses in Exodus 3:14. The phrase 'ehye 'ăšer 'ehye in Exodus 3:14 can be understood not as the revelation of a name, but as an etymological explanation of its meaning. This would frame Y-H-W-H as an imperfective aspect of the Hebrew triconsonantal root היה (h-y-h), "to be, become, come to pass", with a third person masculine י (y-) prefix, equivalent to English "he", in place of the first person א ('-), thereby affording translations as "he who causes to exist", "he who is", etc.; although this would elicit the form Y-H-Y-H (יהיה), rather than Y-H-W-H. To rectify this, some scholars propose that the Tetragrammaton derived instead from the triconsonantal root הוה (h-w-h)—itself an archaic doublet of היה—with the final form eliciting translations similar to those derived from the same.

As such, the consensus among modern scholars considers that YHWH represents a verbal form. In this, the y- prefix represents the third masculine verbal prefix of the verb hyh or hwh, "to be", as indicated in the Hebrew Bible.

== Vocalisation ==
Jews do not pronounce God's four-letter name out of extreme reverence for its holiness and to prevent accidental desecration due an interpretation of Leviticus 24:16. While the exact historical transition is debated, the practice became firmly established during the Second Temple period.

- First Temple Era (Before 586 BCE): The name was used more frequently in daily life, greetings, and blessings.
- Second Temple Era (516 BCE – 70 CE): Uttering the name became restricted to the Jerusalem Temple. Only the High Priest said it aloud, strictly on Yom Kippur (the Day of Atonement).
- Post-Temple Era (70 CE – Present): After the Temple was destroyed, the correct pronunciation was entirely withheld from speech. Over centuries, the original vowels were lost.

=== YHWH and Hebrew script ===
Like all letters in the Hebrew script, the letters in YHWH originally indicated consonants. In unpointed Biblical Hebrew, most vowels are not written, but some are indicated ambiguously, as certain letters came to have a secondary function indicating vowels (similar to the Latin use of I and V to indicate either the consonants /j, w/ or the vowels /i, u/). Hebrew letters used to indicate vowels are known as אִמּוֹת קְרִיאָה (imot kri'a) or matres lectionis ("mothers of reading"). Therefore, it can be difficult to deduce how a word is pronounced from its spelling, and each of the four letters in the Tetragrammaton can individually serve as a mater lectionis.

Several centuries later, some time in the 5th through 10th centuries CE, the original consonantal text of the Hebrew Bible was provided with vowel marks by the Masoretes to assist reading. In places where the word to be read (the qere) differed from that indicated by the consonants of the written text (the ketiv), they wrote the qere in the margin as a note showing what was to be read. In such a case the vowel marks of the qere were written on the ketiv. For a few frequent words, the marginal note was omitted: these are called qere perpetuum.

One of the frequent cases was the Tetragrammaton, which according to later Rabbinite Jewish practices should not be pronounced but read as אֲדֹנָי (Adonai, lit. transl. My Lords, Pluralis majestatis taken as singular), or, if the previous or next word already was Adonai, as "Elohim" (אֱלֹהִים/"God"). Writing the vowel diacritics of these two words on the consonants YHVH produces יְהֹוָה and יֱהֹוִה respectively, ghost-words that would spell "Yehovah" and "Yehovih" respectively.

The oldest complete or nearly complete manuscripts of the Masoretic Text with Tiberian vocalisation, such as the Aleppo Codex and the Leningrad Codex, both of the 10th or 11th century, mostly write יְהוָה (yəhwā^{h}), with no pointing on the first h. It could be because the o diacritic point plays no useful role in distinguishing between Adonai and Elohim and so is redundant, or it could point to the qere being שְׁמָא (š^{ə}mâ), which is Aramaic for "the Name".

=== Yahweh ===
The scholarly consensus since the work of German orientalist Heinrich Ewald in the 1840s is that the original pronunciation of the Tetragrammaton was likely Yahweh (יַהְוֶה). Reasons that favor this vocalization are the Samaritan form Iabé quoted by church fathers Theodoret and Epiphanius, the infixes -yahu and yeho- in compound personal names, and the contracted form yah (as in hallelujah).

The pronunciation Jehovah was unknown until 1520, when it was introduced by Galatinus. The adoption at the time of the Protestant Reformation of "Jehovah" in place of the traditional "Lord" in some new translations, vernacular or Latin, of the biblical Tetragrammaton stirred up dispute about its correctness. In 1711, Adriaan Reland published a book containing the text of 17th-century writings, five attacking and five defending it. As critical of the use of "Jehovah" it incorporated writings by Johannes van den Driesche (1550–1616), known as Drusius; Sixtinus Amama (1593–1629); Louis Cappel (1585–1658); Johannes Buxtorf (1564–1629); Jacob Alting (1618–1679). Defending "Jehovah" were writings by Nicholas Fuller (1557–1626) and Thomas Gataker (1574–1654) and three essays by Johann Leusden (1624–1699). The opponents of "Jehovah" said that the Tetragrammaton should be pronounced as "Adonai" and in general do not speculate on what may have been the original pronunciation, although mention is made of the fact that some held that Jahve was that pronunciation. Thomas Worthington, likely author of the annotations to the Catholic Douay Old Testament (1609–1610), expressing the general Catholic view, wrote, "Iehouah is not the right name of God" and "Only certaine late writers haue framed a new word, by putting the points of Adonai, to the proper letters of this vnknowen name, which are Iod, He, Vau, He, and ſo ſound it Iehouah: which was ſcarſe heard of before an hundred yeares."

In 1869, Smith's Bible Dictionary, a collaborative work of scholars of the time, declared: "Whatever, therefore, be the true pronunciation of the word, there can be little doubt that it is not Jehovah." Almost two centuries after the 17th-century works reprinted by Reland, 19th-century Wilhelm Gesenius reported in his Thesaurus Philologicus on the main reasoning of those who argued either for יַהְוֹה/Yah[w]oh or יַהְוֶה/Yahweh as the original pronunciation of the Tetragrammaton, as opposed to יְהֹוָה/Yehovah. He explicitly cited the 17th-century writers mentioned by Reland as supporters of יְהֹוָה, as well as implicitly citing Johann David Michaelis (1717–1791) and Johann Friedrich von Meyer (1772–1849), the latter of whom Johann Heinrich Kurtz described as the last of those "who have maintained with great pertinacity that יְהֹוָה was the correct and original pointing". Edward Robinson's translation of a work by Gesenius, gives Gesenius' personal view as: "My own view coincides with that of those who regard this name as anciently pronounced [יַהְוֶה/Yahweh] like the Samaritans."

The element yahwi- (ia-wi) is found in Amorite personal names (e.g. yahwi-dagan), commonly denoted as the semantic equivalent of the Akkadian ibašši-DN. The latter refers to one existing which, in the context of deities, can also refer to one's eternal existence, which aligns with Bible verses such as Exodus 3:15 and views that ehye 'ăšer 'ehye can mean "I am the Existing One". It also explains the ease of Israelites applying the Olam (or 'everlasting') epithet from El to Yahweh. But in 1967, J. Philip Hyatt believes it is more likely that yahwi- refers to a god creating and sustaining the life of a newborn child rather than the universe. This conception of God was more popular among ancient Near Easterners but eventually, the Israelites removed the association of yahwi- to any human ancestor and combined it with other elements (e.g. Yahweh ṣəḇāʾōṯ). Hillel Ben-Sasson states in 2019, that there is insufficient evidence for Amorites using yahwi- to refer to a god. But he argues that it mirrors other theophoric names and that yahwi-, or more accurately yawi, derives from the root hwy in pa 'al, which means "he will be".

In 1923, Paul Joüon, in his Grammaire de l'Hébreu biblique, preferred the traditional form Jéhovah rather than the reconstruction Yahweh. However, in the 1996 revised edition, A Grammar of Biblical Hebrew, prepared by Takamitsu Muraoka and published after Joüon's death, the text states: "The divine name יְהוָֹה: the Qre is אֲדֹנָי the Lord, whilst the Ktiv is probably יַהְוֶה (according to ancient witnesses)", and he adds: "Note 1: In our translations, we have used Yahweh, a form widely accepted by scholars, instead of the traditional Jehovah."

In 2010, R. R. Reno agrees that, when in the late first millennium Jewish scholars inserted indications of vowels into the Hebrew Bible, they signalled that what was pronounced was "Adonai" (Lord); non-Jews later combined the vowels of Adonai with the consonants of the Tetragrammaton and invented the name "Jehovah". Mark P. Arnold remarks in 2015, that certain conclusions drawn from the pronunciation of יהוה as "Yahweh" would be valid even if the scholarly consensus were not correct.

=== Yaho ===
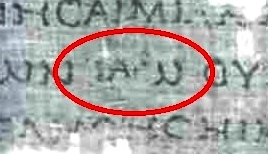
Transcription of the divine name as ΙΑΩ in the 1st-century BCE Septuagint manuscript 4Q120

In 1925, F. C. Burkitt reports that a deity named Yaho or Yeho may have been recognized before the divine revelation to Moses. G. H. Parke-Taylor (1975) states that "of the various alternative forms that have been proposed, the most probable is Yaho or Yahu". He further notes, "Although Yahweh seems to be a probable pronunciation of the Tetragrammaton, since Yahu does not fully account for the final he, there cannot be complete certainty about it.… We can only surmise that Yahweh is the correct pronunciation."

Frank Moore Cross says in 1997: "It must be emphasized that the Amorite verbal form is of interest only in attempting to reconstruct the proto-Hebrew or South Canaanite verbal form used in the name Yahweh. We should argue vigorously against attempts to take Amorite yahwi and yahu as divine epithets." Thomas Römer holds in 2020 that "the original pronunciation of Yhwh was 'Yahô' or 'Yahû'". According to the Encyclopedia Britannica, the name Yahweh originally may have been in its short form Yo, Yah, or Yahu.

Kristin De Troyer argues that ΙΑΩ is likely a Greek transcription of the Hebrew form יהו (Yahu) and that its presence in the first-century BCE manuscript 4Q120 indicates that this form of the divine name was used in some Jewish circles at that time. Max Reisel, in The Mysterious Name of YHWH (1957), says that the "vocalisation of the Tetragrammaton must originally have been YeHūàH or YaHūàH".

== Non-biblical texts ==
=== Texts with Tetragrammaton ===
==== Egyptian Writings ====
Current overviews begin with the Egyptian epigraphy. A hieroglyphic inscription of the Pharaoh Amenhotep III (1402–1363 BCE) at Soleb mentions a group of Shasu whom it calls "the Shasu of Yhwꜣ" (read as: ja-h-wi or ja-h-wa). James D. G. Dunn and John W. Rogerson suggested that the Amenhotep III inscription may indicate that worship of Yahweh originated in an area to the southeast of Israel. A later inscription from the time of Ramesses II (1279–1213 BCE) in West Amara associates the Shasu nomads with S-rr, interpreted as Mount Seir, spoken of in some texts as where Yahweh comes from. Egyptologist Thomas Schneider argued for the existence of a theophoric name in a Book of the Dead papyrus dating to the late 18th or early 19th dynasty which he translated as 'adōnī-rō'ē-yāh, meaning "My lord is the shepherd of Yah".

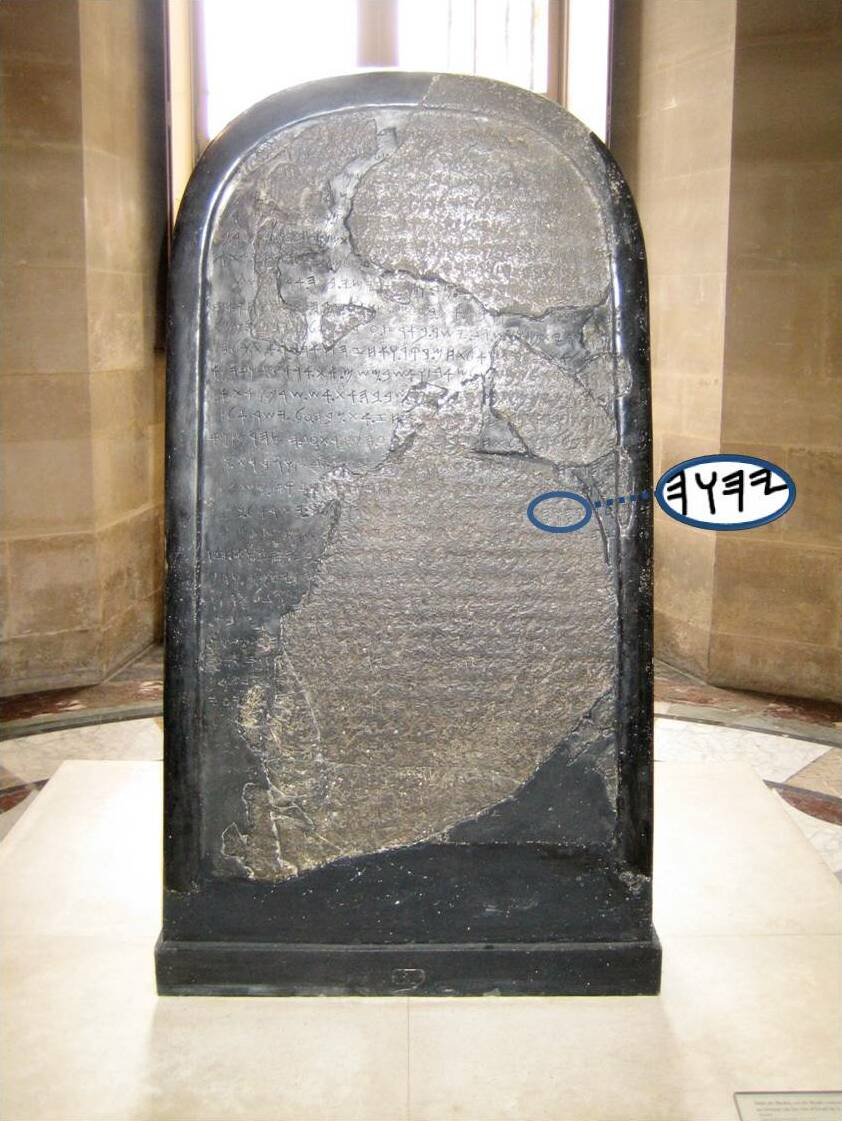
The Mesha Stele bears a reference (840 BCE) to the Israelite god Yahweh.

==== Mesha Stele ====
The Tetragrammaton is found in the inscription on the Mesha Stele, dating from around 840 BCE, in which the king of Moab boasts of having conquered a territory belonging to the Kingdom of Israel and of having brought the vessels of 𐤉𐤄𐤅𐤄 (YHWH) from there to offer them to the Moabite god Chemosh.

==== Hebrew texts ====
Roughly contemporary pottery sherds and plaster inscriptions found at Kuntillet Ajrud mention "Yahweh of Samaria and his Asherah" and "Yahweh of Teman and his Asherah". A tomb inscription at Khirbet el-Qom also mentions Yahweh. Dated slightly later (7th century BCE) there are an ostracon from the collections of Shlomo Moussaieff, and two tiny silver amulet scrolls found at Ketef Hinnom that mention Yahweh. Also a wall inscription, dated to the late 6th century BCE, with mention of Yahweh had been found in a tomb at Khirbet Beit Lei.

==== Lakis Letters ====
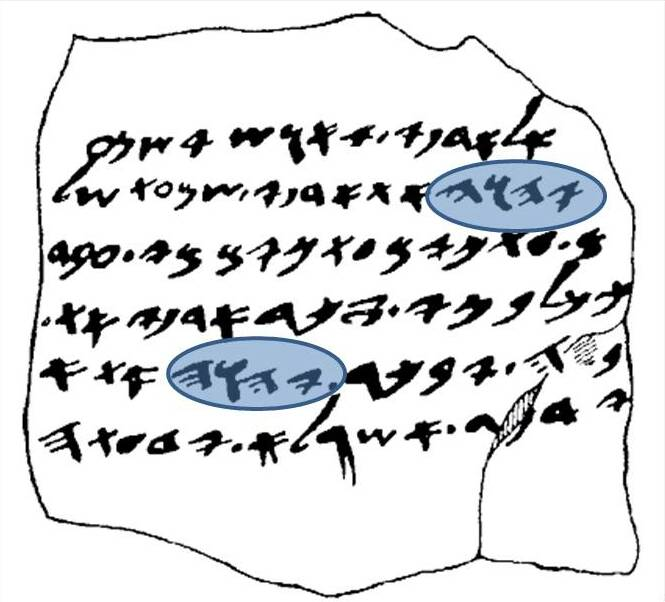
YHWH in one of the Lachish letters.

Yahweh is mentioned also in the Lachish letters (587 BCE) and the slightly earlier Tel Arad ostraca, and on a stone from Mount Gerizim (3rd or the beginning of the 2nd century BCE).

==== Texts with similar theonyms ====
The theonyms YHW and YHH are found in the Elephantine papyri of about 500 BCE. One ostracon with YH is thought to have lost the final letter of an original YHW. These texts are in Aramaic, not the language of the Hebrew Tetragrammaton (YHWH) and, unlike the Tetragrammaton, are of three letters, not four. However, because they were written by Jews, they are assumed to refer to the same deity and to be either an abbreviated form of the Tetragrammaton or the original name from which the name YHWH developed.

Kristin De Troyer says that YHW or YHH, and also YH, are attested in the fifth and fourth-century BCE papyri from Elephantine and Wadi Daliyeh: "In both collections one can read the name of God as Yaho (or Yahu) and Ya". The name YH (Yah/Jah), the first syllable of "Yahweh", appears 50 times in the Old Testament, 26 times alone (Exodus 15:2; 17:16; and 24 times in the Psalms), 24 times in the expression "Hallelujah".

According to De Troyer, the short names, instead of being ineffable like "Yahweh", seem to have been in spoken use not only as elements of personal names but also in reference to God: "The Samaritans thus seem to have pronounced the Name of God as Jaho or Ja." She cites Theodoret (c. 393 – c. 460) as that the shorter names of God were pronounced by the Samaritans as "Iabe" and by the Jews as "Ia". She adds that the Bible also indicates that the short form "Yah" was spoken, as in the phrase "Halleluyah".

The Patrologia Graeca texts of Theodoret differ slightly from what De Troyer says. In Quaestiones in Exodum 15 he says that Samaritans pronounced the name Ἰαβέ and Jews the name Άϊά. (The Greek term Άϊά is a transcription of the Exodus 3:14 phrase אֶהְיֶה (ehyeh), "I am".) In Haereticarum Fabularum Compendium 5.3, he uses the spelling Ἰαβαί.

==== Magical papyri ====
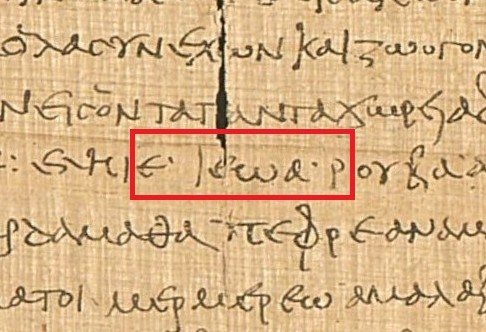
Ιεωα in Col. 15 line 10 (PGM VII 531).

Among the Jews in the Second Temple Period magical amulets became very popular. Representations of the Tetragrammaton name or combinations inspired by it in languages such as Greek and Coptic, giving some indication of its pronunciation, occur as names of powerful agents in Jewish magical papyri found in Egypt. Iαβε Iave and Iαβα Yaba occurs frequently, "apparently the Samaritan enunciation of the tetragrammaton YHWH (Yahweh)".

The most commonly invoked god is Ιαω (Iaō), another vocalization of the tetragrammaton YHWH. There is a single instance of the heptagram ιαωουηε (iaōouēe).

Yāwē is found in an Ethiopian Christian list of magical names of Jesus, purporting to have been taught by him to his disciples.

==== Vernacular evidence ====
Also relevant is the use of the name in theophoric names; there is a common Hebrew prefix form, Yeho or "Y^{e}hō-", and a common suffix form, "Yahū" or "-Y^{e}hū". These provide some corroborating evidence of how YHWH was pronounced.

== Hebrew Bible ==
=== Masoretic Text ===
According to the Jewish Encyclopedia it occurs 5,410 times in the Hebrew scriptures. In the Hebrew Bible, the Tetragrammaton occurs 6828 times, as can be seen in Kittel's Biblia Hebraica and the Biblia Hebraica Stuttgartensia. In addition, the marginal notes or masorah (Note: masora parva (small) or masora marginalis: notes to the Masoretic Text, written in the margins of the left, right and between the columns and the comments on the top and bottom margins to masora magna (large).) indicate that in another 134 places, where the received text has the word Adonai, an earlier text had the Tetragrammaton. (Note: C. D. Ginsburg in The Massorah. Compiled from manuscripts, London 1880, vol I, p. 25, 26, § 115 lists the 134 places where this practice is observed, and likewise in 8 places where the received text has Elohim (C. D. Ginsburg, Introduction to the Massoretico – Critical Edition of the Hebrew Bible, London 1897, s. 368, 369). These places are listed in: C.D. Ginsburg, The Massorah. Compiled from manuscripts, vol I, p. 26, § 116.) which would add up to 142 additional occurrences. Even in the Dead Sea Scrolls practice varied with regard to use of the Tetragrammaton. According to Brown–Driver–Briggs, יְהֹוָה (qere אֲדֹנָי) occurs 6,518 times, and יֱהֹוִה (qere אֱלֹהִים) 305 times in the Masoretic Text.

The first appearance of the Tetragrammaton is in the Book of Genesis 2:4. The only books it does not appear in are Ecclesiastes, the Book of Esther, and Song of Songs.

In the Book of Esther the Tetragrammaton does not appear, but it has been distinguished acrostic-wise in the initial or last letters of four consecutive words, (Note: These are Est 1:20; 5:4, 13 and 7:7. The same acrostic has been seen in Exodus 3:14 and in the first four words of Psalm 96:11 ("Bible Gateway passage: 96:11 תהילים – The Westminster Leningrad Codex". Archived from the original on 20 February 2015.).) as indicated in Est 7:5 by writing the four letters in red in at least three ancient Hebrew manuscripts.

The short form יָהּ/Yah (a digrammaton) occurs 50 times if the phrase hallellu-Yah is included": 43 times in the Psalms, once in Exodus 15:2; 17:16; Isaiah 12:2; 26:4, and twice in Isaiah 38:11. It also appears in the Greek phrase Ἁλληλουϊά (Alleluia, Hallelujah) in Revelation 19:1, 3, 4, 6.

Other short forms are found as a component of theophoric Hebrew names in the Bible: jô- or jehô- (29 names) and -jāhû or -jāh (127 jnames). A form of jāhû/jehô appears in the name Elioenai (Elj(eh)oenai) in 1Ch 3:23–24; 4:36; 7:8; Ezr 22:22, 27; Neh 12:41.

The following graph shows the absolute number of occurrences of the Tetragrammaton (6828 in all) in the books in the Masoretic Text, without relation to the length of the books.

=== Leningrad Codex ===
Six presentations of the Tetragrammaton with some or all of the vowel points of אֲדֹנָי (Adonai) or אֱלֹהִים (Elohim) are found in the Leningrad Codex of 1008–1010, as shown below. The close transcriptions do not indicate that the Masoretes intended the name to be pronounced in that way (see qere perpetuum).

Chapter and verse	Masoretic Text display	Close transcription of the display	Ref.	Explanation
Genesis 2:4	יְהוָה	Yǝhwāh		This is the first occurrence of the Tetragrammaton in the Hebrew Bible and shows the most common set of vowels used in the Masoretic Text. It is the same as the form used in Genesis 3:14 below, but with the dot (holam) on the first he left out, because it is a little redundant.
Genesis 3:14	יְהֹוָה	Yǝhōwāh		This is a set of vowels used rarely in the Masoretic Text, and are essentially the vowels from Adonai (with the hataf patakh reverting to its natural state as a shewa).
Judges 16:28	יֱהֹוִה	Yĕhōwih		When the Tetragrammaton is preceded by Adonai, it receives the vowels from the name Elohim instead. The hataf segol does not revert to a shewa because doing so could lead to confusion with the vowels in Adonai.
Genesis 15:2	יֱהוִה	Yĕhwih		Just as above, this uses the vowels from Elohim, but like the second version, the dot (holam) on the first he is omitted as redundant.
1 Kings 2:26	יְהֹוִה	Yǝhōwih		Here, the dot (holam) on the first he is present, but the hataf segol does get reverted to a shewa.
Ezekiel 24:24	יְהוִה	Yǝhwih		Here, the dot (holam) on the first he is omitted, and the hataf segol gets reverted to a shewa.

ĕ is hataf segol; ǝ is the pronounced form of plain shva.

=== Dead Sea Scrolls ===
In the Dead Sea Scrolls and other Hebrew and Aramaic texts the Tetragrammaton and some other names of God in Judaism (such as El or Elohim) were sometimes written in paleo-Hebrew script, showing that they were treated specially. Most of God's names were pronounced until about the 2nd century BCE. Then, as a tradition of non-pronunciation of the names developed, alternatives for the Tetragrammaton appeared, such as Adonai, Kurios and Theos. The 4Q120, a Greek fragment of Leviticus (26:2–16) discovered in the Dead Sea scrolls (Qumran) has ιαω ("Iao"), the Greek form of the Hebrew trigrammaton YHW. The historian John the Lydian (6th century) wrote: "The Roman Varro [116–27 BCE] defining him [that is the Jewish God] says that he is called Iao in the Chaldean mysteries" (De Mensibus IV 53). Van Cooten mentions that Iao is one of the "specifically Jewish designations for God" and "the Aramaic papyri from the Jews at Elephantine show that 'Iao' is an original Jewish term".

The preserved manuscripts from Qumran show the inconsistent practice of writing the Tetragrammaton, mainly in biblical quotations: in some manuscripts is written in paleo-Hebrew script, square scripts or replaced with four dots or dashes (tetrapuncta).

The members of the Qumran community were aware of the existence of the Tetragrammaton, but this was not tantamount to granting consent for its existing use and speaking. This is evidenced not only by special treatment of the Tetragrammaton in the text, but by the recommendation recorded in the 'Rule of Association' (VI, 27): "Who will remember the most glorious name, which is above all [...]".

The table below presents all the manuscripts in which the Tetragrammaton is written in paleo-Hebrew script, (Note: In some manuscripts the Tetragrammaton was replaced by the word 'El or 'Elohim written in Paleo-Hebrew script, they are: 1QpMic (1Q14) 12 3; 1QMyst (1Q27) II 11; 1QHa I (Suk. = Puech IX) 26; II (X) 34; VII (XV) 5; XV (VII) 25; 1QH^{b} (1Q35) 1 5; 3QUnclassified fragments (3Q14) 18 2; 4QpPs^{b} (4Q173) 5 4; 4QAges of Creation A (4Q180) 1 1; 4QMidrEschate?(4Q183) 2 1; 3 1; fr. 1 kol. II 3; 4QS^{d} (4Q258) IX 8; 4QD^{b} (4Q267) fr. 9 kol. i 2; kol. iv 4; kol. v 4; 4QD^{c} (4Q268) 1 9; 4QComposition Concerning Divine Providence (4Q413) fr. 1–2 2, 4; 6QD (6Q15) 3 5; 6QpapHymn (6Q18) 6 5; 8 5; 10 3. W 4QShirShabbg (4Q406) 1 2; 3 2 występuje 'Elohim.) in square scripts, and all the manuscripts in which the copyists have used tetrapuncta.

Copyists used the 'tetrapuncta' apparently to warn against pronouncing the name of God. In the manuscript number 4Q248 is in the form of bars.

PALEO-HEBREW	SQUARE	TETRAPUNCTA
1Q11 (1QPs^{b}) 2–5 3 (link: )	2Q13 (2QJer) (link: )	1QS VIII 14 (link: )
1Q14 (1QpMic) 1–5 1, 2 (link: )	4Q27 (4QNum^{b}) (link: )	1QIsa^{a} XXXIII 7, XXXV 15 (link: )
1QpHab VI 14; X 7, 14; XI 10 (link: )	4Q37 (4QDeut^{j}) (link: )	4Q53 (4QSam^{c}) 13 III 7, 7 (link: )
1Q15 (1QpZeph) 3, 4 (link: )	4Q78 (4QXII^{c}) (link: )	4Q175 (4QTest) 1, 19
2Q3 (2QExod^{b}) 2 2; 7 1; 8 3 (link: )	4Q96 (4QPs^{o} (link: )	4Q176 (4QTanḥ) 1–2 i 6, 7, 9; 1–2 ii 3; 8–10 6, 8, 10 (link: )
3Q3 (3QLam) 1 2 (link: )	4Q158 (4QRP^{a}) (link: )	4Q196 (4QpapToba ar) 17 i 5; 18 15 (link: )
4Q20 (4QExod^{j}) 1–2 3 (link: )	4Q163 (4Qpap pIsa^{c}) I 19; II 6; 15–16 1; 21 9; III 3, 9; 25 7 (link: )	4Q248 (history of the kings of Greece) 5 (link: )
4Q26b (4QLev^{g}) linia 8 (link: )	4QpNah (4Q169) II 10 (link: )	4Q306 (4QMen of People Who Err) 3 5 (link: )
4Q38a (4QDeut^{k2}) 5 6 (link: )	4Q173 (4QpPs^{b}) 4 2 (link: )	4Q382 (4QparaKings et al.) 9+11 5; 78 2
4Q57 (4QIsa^{c}) (link: )	4Q177 (4QCatena A) (link: )	4Q391 (4Qpap Pseudo-Ezechiel) 36, 52, 55, 58, 65 (link: )
4Q161 (4QpIsa^{a}) 8–10 13 (link: )	4Q215a (4QTime of Righteousness) (link: )	4Q462 (4QNarrative C) 7; 12 (link: )
4Q165 (4QpIsa^{e}) 6 4 (link: )	4Q222 (4QJub^{g}) (link: )	4Q524 (4QT^{b})) 6–13 4, 5 (link: )
4Q171 (4QpPs^{a}) II 4, 12, 24; III 14, 15; IV 7, 10, 19 (link: )	4Q225 (4QPsJub^{a}) (link: )	XḤev/SeEschat Hymn (XḤev/Se 6) 2 7
11Q2 (11QLev^{b}) 2 2, 6, 7 (link: )	4Q365 (4QRP^{c}) (link: )	
11Q5 (11QPs^{a}) (link: )	4Q377 (4QApocryphal Pentateuch B) 2 ii 3, 5 (link: )	
	4Q382 (4Qpap paraKings) (link: )	
	11Q6 (11QPs^{b}) (link: )	
	11Q7 (11QPs^{c}) (link: )	
	11Q19 (11QT^{a})	
	11Q20 (11QT^{b}) (link: )	
	11Q11 (11QapocrPs) (link: )	

== Septuagint ==
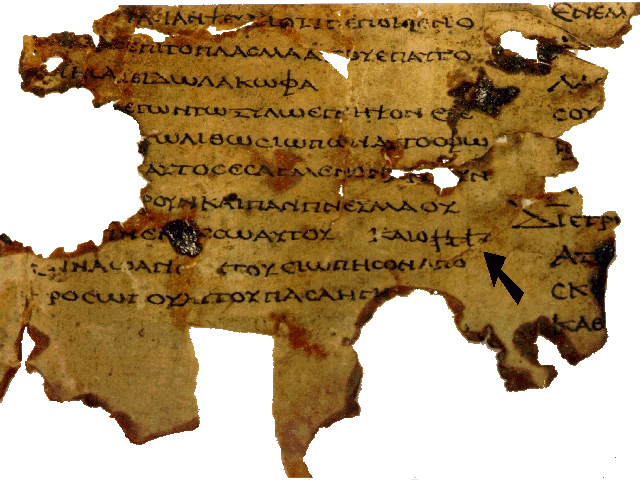
Tetragrammaton written in paleo-Hebrew script on Greek Minor Prophets Scroll from Nahal Hever

Editions of the Septuagint Old Testament are based on the complete or almost complete fourth-century manuscripts Codex Vaticanus, Codex Sinaiticus and Codex Alexandrinus and consistently use Κ[ύριο]ς, "Lord", where the Masoretic Text has the Tetragrammaton in Hebrew. This corresponds with the Jewish practice of replacing the Tetragrammaton with "Adonai" when reading the Hebrew word.

However, five of the oldest manuscripts now extant (in fragmentary form) render the Tetragrammaton into Greek in a different way.

Two of these are of the first century BCE: Papyrus Fouad 266 uses יהוה in the normal Hebrew alphabet in the midst of its Greek text, and 4Q120 uses the Greek transcription of the name, ΙΑΩ. Three later manuscripts use 𐤉𐤄𐤅𐤄, the name יהוה in Paleo-Hebrew script: the Greek Minor Prophets Scroll from Nahal Hever, Papyrus Oxyrhynchus 3522 and Papyrus Oxyrhynchus 5101.

Other extant ancient fragments of Septuagint or Old Greek manuscripts provide no evidence on the use of the Tetragrammaton, Κύριος, or ΙΑΩ in correspondence with the Hebrew-text Tetragrammaton. They include the oldest known example, Papyrus Rylands 458.

Scholars differ on whether in the original Septuagint translations the Tetragrammaton was represented by Κύριος, by ΙΑΩ, by the Tetragrammaton in either normal or Paleo-Hebrew form, or whether different translators used different forms in different books.

Frank Shaw argues that the Tetragrammaton continued to be articulated until the second or third century CE and that the use of Ιαω was by no means limited to magical or mystical formulas, but was still normal in more elevated contexts such as that exemplified by Papyrus 4Q120. Shaw considers all theories that posit in the Septuagint a single original form of the divine name as merely based on a priori assumptions. Accordingly, he declares: "The matter of any (especially single) 'original' form of the divine name in the LXX is too complex, the evidence is too scattered and indefinite, and the various approaches offered for the issue are too simplistic" to account for the actual scribal practices (p. 158). He holds that the earliest stages of the LXX's translation were marked by diversity (p. 262), with the choice of certain divine names depending on the context in which they appear (cf. Gen 4:26; Exod 3:15; 8:22; 28:32; 32:5; and 33:19). He treats of the related blank spaces in some Septuagint manuscripts and the setting of spaces around the divine name in 4Q120 and Papyrus Fouad 266b (p. 265), and repeats that "there was no one 'original' form but different translators had different feelings, theological beliefs, motivations, and practices when it came to their handling of the name" (p. 271). His view has won the support of Anthony R. Meyer, Bob Becking, and (commenting on Shaw's 2011 dissertation on the subject) D.T. Runia.

Mogens Müller says that, while no clearly Jewish manuscript of the Septuagint has been found with Κύριος representing the Tetragrammaton, other Jewish writings of the time show that Jews did use the term Κύριος for God, and it was because Christians found it in the Septuagint that they were able to apply it to Christ. In fact, the deuterocanonical books of the Septuagint, written originally in Greek (e.g., Wisdom, 2 and 3 Maccabees), do speak of God as Κύριος and thus show that "the use of κύριος as a representation of יהוה must be pre-Christian in origin".

Similarly, while consistent use of Κύριος to represent the Tetragrammaton has been called "a distinguishing mark for any Christian LXX manuscript", Eugen J. Pentiuc says: "No definitive conclusion has been reached thus far." And Sean McDonough denounces as implausible the idea that Κύριος did not appear in the Septuagint before the Christian era.

Speaking of the Greek Minor Prophets Scroll from Nahal Hever, which is a kaige recension of the Septuagint, "a revision of the Old Greek text to bring it closer to the Hebrew text of the Bible as it existed in ca. 2nd–1st century BCE" (and thus not necessarily the original text), Kristin De Troyer remarks: "The problem with a recension is that one does not know what is the original form and what the recension. Hence, is the paleo-Hebrew Tetragrammaton secondary – a part of the recension – or proof of the Old Greek text? This debate has not yet been solved."

While some interpret the presence of the Tetragrammaton in Papyrus Fouad 266, the oldest Septuagint manuscript in which it appears, as an indication of what was in the original text, others see this manuscript as "an archaizing and hebraizing revision of the earlier translation κύριος". Of this papyrus, De Troyer asks: "Is it a recension or not?" In this regard she says that Emanuel Tov notes that in this manuscript a second scribe inserted the four-letter Tetragrammaton where the first scribe left spaces large enough for the six-letter word Κύριος, and that Pietersma and Hanhart say the papyrus "already contains some pre-hexaplaric corrections towards a Hebrew text (which would have had the Tetragrammaton). She also mentions Septuagint manuscripts that have Θεός and one that has παντοκράτωρ where the Hebrew text has the Tetragrammaton. She concludes: "It suffices to say that in old Hebrew and Greek witnesses, God has many names. Most if not all were pronounced till about the second century BCE. As slowly onwards there developed a tradition of non-pronunciation, alternatives for the Tetragrammaton appeared. The reading Adonai was one of them. Finally, before Kurios became a standard rendering Adonai, the Name of God was rendered with Theos." In the Book of Exodus alone, Θεός represents the Tetragrammaton 41 times.

Robert J. Wilkinson says that the Greek Minor Prophets Scroll from Nahal Hever is also a kaige recension and thus not strictly a Septuagint text.

Origen (Commentary on Psalms 2.2) said that in the most accurate manuscripts the name was written in an older form of the Hebrew characters, the paleo-Hebrew letters, not the square: "In the more accurate exemplars the (divine) name is written in Hebrew characters; not, however, in the current script, but in the most ancient." While Pietersma interprets this statement as referring to the Septuagint, Wilkinson says one might assume that Origen refers specifically to the version of Aquila of Sinope, which follows the Hebrew text very closely, but he may perhaps refer to Greek versions in general.

=== Manuscripts of the Septuagint and later Greek renderings ===
The great majority of extant manuscripts of the Old Testament in Greek, complete or fragmentary, dated to the ninth century CE or earlier, employ Κύριος to represent the Tetragrammaton of the Hebrew text. The following do not. They include the oldest now extant.

1. Manuscripts of the Septuagint or recensions thereof
  - 1st century BCE
    - 4QpapLXXLev^{b} – fragments of the Book of Leviticus, chapters 1 to 5. In two verses: 3:12; 4:27 the Tetragrammaton of the Hebrew Bible is represented by Greek ΙΑΩ.
    - Papyrus Fouad 266b (848) – fragments of Deuteronomy, chapters 10 to 33. The Tetragrammaton appears in square Hebrew/Aramaic script. According to a disputed view, the first copyist left a blank space marked with a dot, and another inscribed the letters.
  - 1st century CE
    - Papyrus Oxyrhynchus 3522 – contains parts of two verses of chapter 42 of the Book of Job and has the Tetragrammaton in paleo-Hebrew letters.
    - Greek Minor Prophets Scroll from Nahal Hever – in three fragments whose contents were published separately.
      - Se2grXII (LXX^{IEJ 12}) has the Tetragrammaton in 1 place.
      - 8HevXII a (LXX^{VTS 10a}) in 24 places, in whole or part.
      - 8HevXII b (LXX^{VTS 10b}) in 4 places.
  - 1st to 2nd century
    - Papyrus Oxyrhynchus 5101 – contains fragments of the Book of Psalms. It has YHWH in Paleo-Hebrew script.
  - 3rd century CE
    - Papyrus Oxyrhynchus 1007 – contains Genesis 2 and 3. The divine name is written with a double yodh.
    - Papyrus Oxyrhynchus 656 – fragments of the Book of Genesis, chapters 14 to 27. Has Κύριος where the first copyist left blank spaces
    - Papyrus Berlin 17213 – fragments of the Book of Genesis, chapter 19. One space is left blank. Emanuel Tov thinks it indicated the end of a paragraph. It has been dated to 3rd century CE.
2. Manuscripts of Greek translations made by Symmachus and Aquila of Sinope (2nd century CE)
  - 3rd century CE
    - Papyrus Vindobonensis Greek 39777. Has the Tetragrammaton in archaic Hebrew script.
  - 5th century CE
    - AqTaylor, this manuscript of the Aquila version is dated after the middle of the 5th century, but not later than the beginning of the 6th century.
    - AqBurkitt – a palimpsest manuscript of the Aquila version dated late 5th century or early 6th century.
3. Manuscripts with Hexaplaric elements
  - 6th century CE
    - Codex Marchalianus – In addition to the Septuagint text of the prophets (with κ̅ς̅), the manuscript contains marginal notes from a hand "not much later than the original scribe" indicating Hexaplaric variations, each identified as from Aquila, Symmachus or Theodotion. Marginal notes on some of the prophets contain πιπι to indicate that κ̅ς̅ in the text corresponds to the Tetragrammaton. Two marginal notes at Ezekiel 1:2 and 11:1 use the form ιαω with reference to the Tetragrammaton.
  - 7th century CE
    - Taylor-Schechter 12.182 – a Hexapla manuscript with Tetragrammaton in Greek letters ΠΙΠΙ. It has Hebrew text transliterated into Greek, Aquila, Symmachus and the Septuagint.
  - 9th century CE
    - Ambrosiano O 39 sup. – the latest Greek manuscript containing the name of God is Origen's Hexapla, transmitting among other translations the text of the Septuagint, Aquila, Symmachus and Theodotion, and in three other unidentified Greek translations (Quinta, Sextus and Septima). This codex, copied from a much earlier original, comes from the late 9th century, and is stored in the Biblioteca Ambrosiana.

== Patristic writings ==
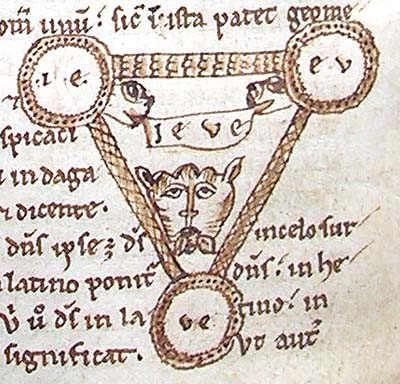
Petrus Alphonsi's early 12th-century Tetragrammaton-Trinity diagram, rendering the name as "IEVE", which in contemporary letters is "IEUE"

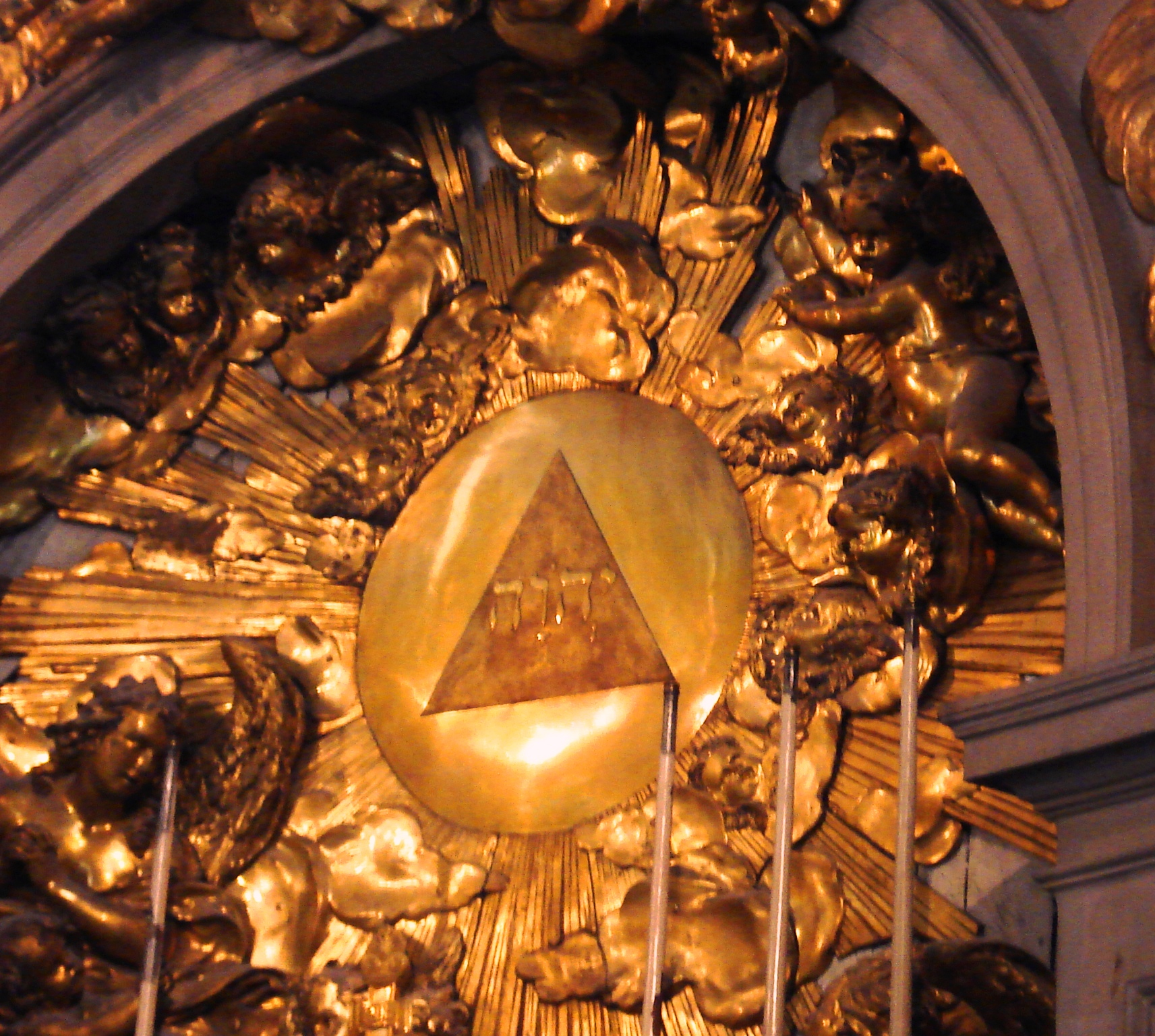
Tetragrammaton at the Fifth Chapel of the Palace of Versailles, France

According to the Catholic Encyclopedia (1910) and B. D. Eerdmans:

- Diodorus Siculus (1st century BCE) writes Ἰαῶ (Iao);
- Irenaeus (d. c. 202) reports that the Gnostics formed a compound Ἰαωθ (Iaoth) with the last syllable of Sabaoth. He also reports that the Valentinian gnostics use Ἰαῶ (Iao);
- Clement of Alexandria (d. c. 215) reports: "the mystic name of four letters which was affixed to those alone to whom the adytum was accessible, is called Ἰαοὺ" (Iaoú); printed variants made in the 1800s say ἰαοῦε (Iaoúe) and ἰὰ οὐὲ.
- Origen (d. c. 254), Ἰαώ (Iao);
- Porphyry (d. c. 305) according to Eusebius (died 339), Ἰευώ (Ieuo);
- Epiphanius (died 404), who was born in Palestine and spent a considerable part of his life there, gives Ἰά (Ia) and Ἰάβε (pronounced at that time /ja'vε/) and explains Ἰάβε as meaning He who was and is and always exists.
- Jerome (died 420) speaks of certain Greek writers who misunderstood the Hebrew letters יהוה (read right-to-left) as the Greek letters ΠΙΠΙ (read left-to-right), thus changing YHWH to pipi.
- Theodoret (d. c. 457) writes Ἰαώ (Iao); he also reports that the Samaritans say Ἰαβέ or Ἰαβαί (both pronounced at that time /ja'vε/), while the Jews say Ἀϊά (Aia). (The latter is probably not יהוה but אהיה Ehyeh = "I am " or "I will be", Exod. 3:14 which the Jews counted among the names of God.)
- (Pseudo-)Jerome (4th/5th or 9th century),: IAHO. This work was traditionally attributed to Jerome and, in spite of the view of one modern writer who in 1936 said it is "now believed to be genuine and to be dated before CE 392" is still generally attributed to the 9th century and to be non-authentic.

== Peshitta ==
The Peshitta (Syriac translation), probably in the second century, uses the word "Lord" (ܡܳܪܝܳܐ, pronounced māryā or moryo (Western pronunciation) for the Tetragrammaton.

== Vulgate ==
The Vulgate (Latin translation) made from the Hebrew in the 4th century CE, uses the word Dominus ("Lord"), a translation of the Hebrew word Adonai, for the Tetragrammaton.

The Vulgate translation, though made not from the Septuagint but from the Hebrew text, did not depart from the practice used in the Septuagint. Thus, for most of its history, Christianity's translations of the Scriptures have used equivalents of Adonai to represent the Tetragrammaton. Only at about the beginning of the 16th century did Christian translations of the Bible appear combining the vowels of Adonai with the four (consonantal) letters of the Tetragrammaton.

== Usage in religious traditions ==
=== Judaism ===
Especially due to the existence of the Mesha Stele, the Jahwist tradition found in Exodus 3:15, and ancient Hebrew and Greek texts, biblical scholars widely hold that the Tetragrammaton and other names of God were spoken by the ancient Israelites and their neighbours.

By at least the 3rd century BCE, the name was not pronounced in normal speech, but only in certain ritual contexts. The Talmud relays this change occurred after the death of Simeon the Just (either Simon I or his great-great-grandson Simon II). Philo calls the name ineffable, and says that it is lawful only for those "whose ears and tongues are purified by wisdom to hear and utter it in a holy place", that is, the priests in the Temple. In another passage, commenting on Leviticus 24:15, Philo writes, "If any one [...] should even dare to utter his name unseasonably, let him expect the penalty of death." Some time after the destruction of the Second Temple, the spoken use of God's name as it was written ceased altogether, though knowledge of the pronunciation was perpetuated in rabbinic schools.

Rabbinic sources suggest that the name of God was pronounced only once a year, by the high priest, on the Day of Atonement. Others, including Maimonides, claim that the name was pronounced daily in the liturgy of the Temple in the priestly blessing of worshippers, after the daily sacrifice; in synagogues, though, a substitute (probably "Adonai") was used. According to the Talmud, in the last generations before the fall of Jerusalem, the name was pronounced in a low tone so that the sounds were lost in the chant of the priests. Since the destruction of Second Temple of Jerusalem in 70 CE, the Tetragrammaton has no longer been pronounced in the liturgy. However the pronunciation was still known in Babylonia in the latter part of the 4th century.

==== Spoken prohibitions ====
The vehemence with which the utterance of the name is denounced in the Mishnah suggests that use of the name Yahweh was unacceptable in rabbinical Judaism. "He who pronounces the Name with its own letters has no part in the world to come!" Such is the prohibition of pronouncing the Name as written that it is sometimes called the "Ineffable", "Unutterable", or "Distinctive Name", or "Explicit Name" (Shem HaMephorash in Hebrew).

Halakha prescribes that although the Name is written Hebrew: יהוה, romanized: yodh he waw he, if not preceded by (אֲדֹנָי, Adonai) then it is only to be pronounced "Adonai" and if preceded by "Adonai" then it is only to be pronounced as "Our God" (אֱלֹהֵינוּ, Eloheinu), or, in rare cases, as a repetition of Adonai, e.g., the Thirteen Attributes of Mercy (שְׁלוֹשׁ־עֶשְׂרֵה, Shelosh-'Esreh) in Exodus 34:6–7; the latter names too are regarded as holy names, and are only to be pronounced in prayer. Thus when someone wants to refer in third person to either the written or spoken Name, the term HaShem ('the Name') is used; and this handle itself can also be used in prayer. (Note: For example, in the common utterance and praise, "Barukh Hashem" (Blessed [i.e. the source of all] is Hashem), or "Hashem yishmor" (God protect [us])) The Masoretes added vowel points (niqqud) and cantillation marks to the manuscripts to indicate vowel usage and for use in ritual chanting of readings from the Bible in Jewish prayer in synagogues. To יהוה they added the vowels for אֲדֹנָי (Adonai, lit. transl. My Lords, Pluralis majestatis taken as singular), the word to use when the text was read. While "HaShem" is the most common way to reference "the Name", the terms "HaMaqom" (lit. 'The Place', i.e. "The Omnipresent") and "Raḥmana" (Aramaic, "Merciful") are used in the mishna and gemara, still used in the phrases HaMaqom y'naḥem ethḥem ("may The Omnipresent console you"), the traditional phrase used in sitting Shiva and Raḥmana l'tzlan ("may the Merciful save us" i.e. "God forbid").

==== Written prohibitions ====
The written Tetragrammaton, as well as six other names of God, must be treated with special sanctity. They cannot be disposed of regularly, lest they be desecrated, but are usually put in long-term storage or buried in Jewish cemeteries in order to retire them from use. Similarly, writing the Tetragrammaton (or these other names) unnecessarily is prohibited, so as to avoid having them treated disrespectfully, an action that is forbidden. To guard the sanctity of the Name, sometimes a letter is substituted by a different letter in writing (e.g. יקוק), or the letters are separated by one or more hyphens, a practice applied also to the English name "God", which some Jews write as "G-d". Most Jewish authorities say that this practice is not obligatory for the English name.

==== Kabbalah ====
Kabbalistic tradition holds that the correct pronunciation is known to a select few people in each generation, it is not generally known what this pronunciation is. There are two main schools of Kabbalah arising in 13th century Spain. These are called Theosophic Kabbalah represented by Rabbi Moshe De Leon and the Zohar, and the Kabbalah of Names or Prophetic Kabbalah whose main representative is Rabbi Abraham Abulafia of Saragossa. Rabbi Abulafia wrote many wisdom books and prophetic books where the name is used for meditation purposes from 1271 onwards. Abulafia put a lot of attention on Exodus 15 and the Songs of Moses. In this song it says "Yehovah is a Man of War, Yehovah is his name". For Abulafia the goal of prophecy was for a man to come to the level of prophecy and be called "Yehovah a man of war". Abulafia also used the tetragrammaton in a spiritual war against his spiritual enemies. For example, he prophesied in his book "The Sign", "Therefore, thus said YHWH, the God of Israel: Have no fear of the enemy" (See Hylton, A The Prophetic Jew Abraham Abulafia, 2015).

Moshe Chaim Luzzatto, says that the tree of the Tetragrammaton "unfolds" in accordance with the intrinsic nature of its letters, "in the same order in which they appear in the Name, in the mystery of ten and the mystery of four." Namely, the upper cusp of the Yod is Arich Anpin and the main body of Yod is and Abba; the first Hei is Imma; the Vav is Ze`ir Anpin and the second Hei is Nukvah. It unfolds in this aforementioned order and "in the mystery of the four expansions" that are constituted by the following various spellings of the letters:

ע"ב/`AV : יו"ד ה"י וי"ו ה"י, so called "`AV" according to its gematria value ע"ב=70+2=72.

ס"ג/SaG: יו"ד ה"י וא"ו ה"י, gematria 63.

מ"ה/MaH: יו"ד ה"א וא"ו ה"א, gematria 45.

ב"ן/BaN: יו"ד ה"ה ו"ו ה"ה, gematria 52.

Luzzatto summarises, "In sum, all that exists is founded on the mystery of this Name and upon the mystery of these letters of which it consists. This means that all the different orders and laws are all drawn after and come under the order of these four letters. This is not one particular pathway but rather the general path, which includes everything that exists in the Sefirot in all their details and which brings everything under its order."

Another parallel is drawn between the four letters of the Tetragrammaton and the Four Worlds: the י is associated with Atziluth, the first ה with Beri'ah, the ו with Yetzirah, and final ה with Assiah.

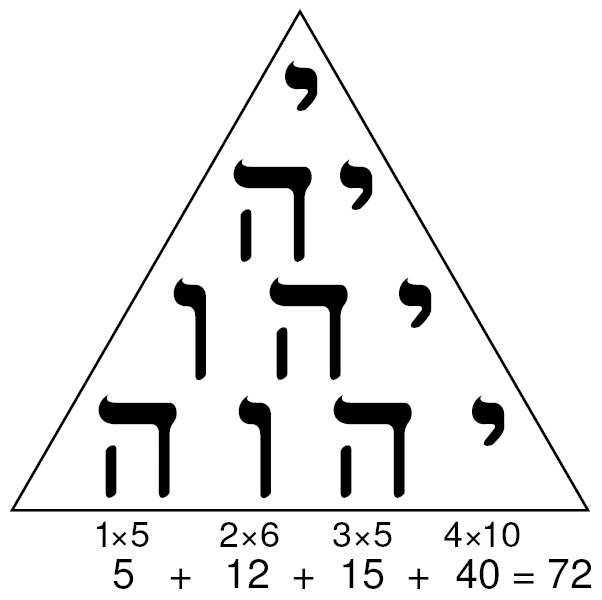
A tetractys of the letters of the Tetragrammaton adds up to 72 by gematria.

There are some who believe that the tetractys and its mysteries influenced the early kabbalists. A Hebrew tetractys in a similar way has the letters of the Tetragrammaton (the four lettered name of God in Hebrew scripture) inscribed on the ten positions of the tetractys, from right to left. It has been argued that the Kabbalistic Tree of Life, with its ten spheres of emanation, is in some way connected to the tetractys, but its form is not that of a triangle. The occult writer Dion Fortune says:

The point is assigned to Kether;
the line to Chokmah;
the two-dimensional plane to Binah;
consequently the three-dimensional solid naturally falls to Chesed.

(The first two-dimensional figure is the triangle, and the first three-dimensional solid is the tetrahedron.)

The relationship between geometrical shapes and the first four Sephirot is analogous to the geometrical correlations in the tetractys, and unveils the relevance of the Tree of Life with the tetractys.

=== Samaritans ===
The Samaritans shared the taboo of the Jews about the utterance of the name, and there is no evidence that its pronunciation was common Samaritan practice. However Sanhedrin 10:1 includes the comment of Rabbi Mana II, "for example those Kutim who take an oath" would also have no share in the world to come, which suggests that Mana thought some Samaritans used the name in making oaths. (Their priests have preserved a liturgical pronunciation "Yahwe" or "Yahwa" to the present day.) Shema (שמא, Aramaic for "the Name") remains the everyday usage of the name among Samaritans, paralleling the Jewish use of HaShem (השם, Hebrew for "the Name"). This reading of the tetragrammaton by Samaritans dates back to at least the 4th century CE, as evidenced in two poems by the Samaritan author Marqah.

=== Christianity ===
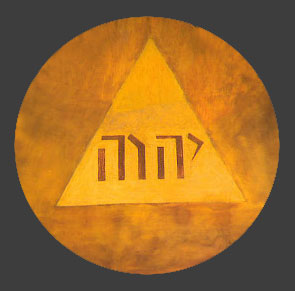
Tetragrammaton by Francisco Goya: "The Name of God", YHWH in triangle, detail from fresco Adoration of the Name of God, 1772

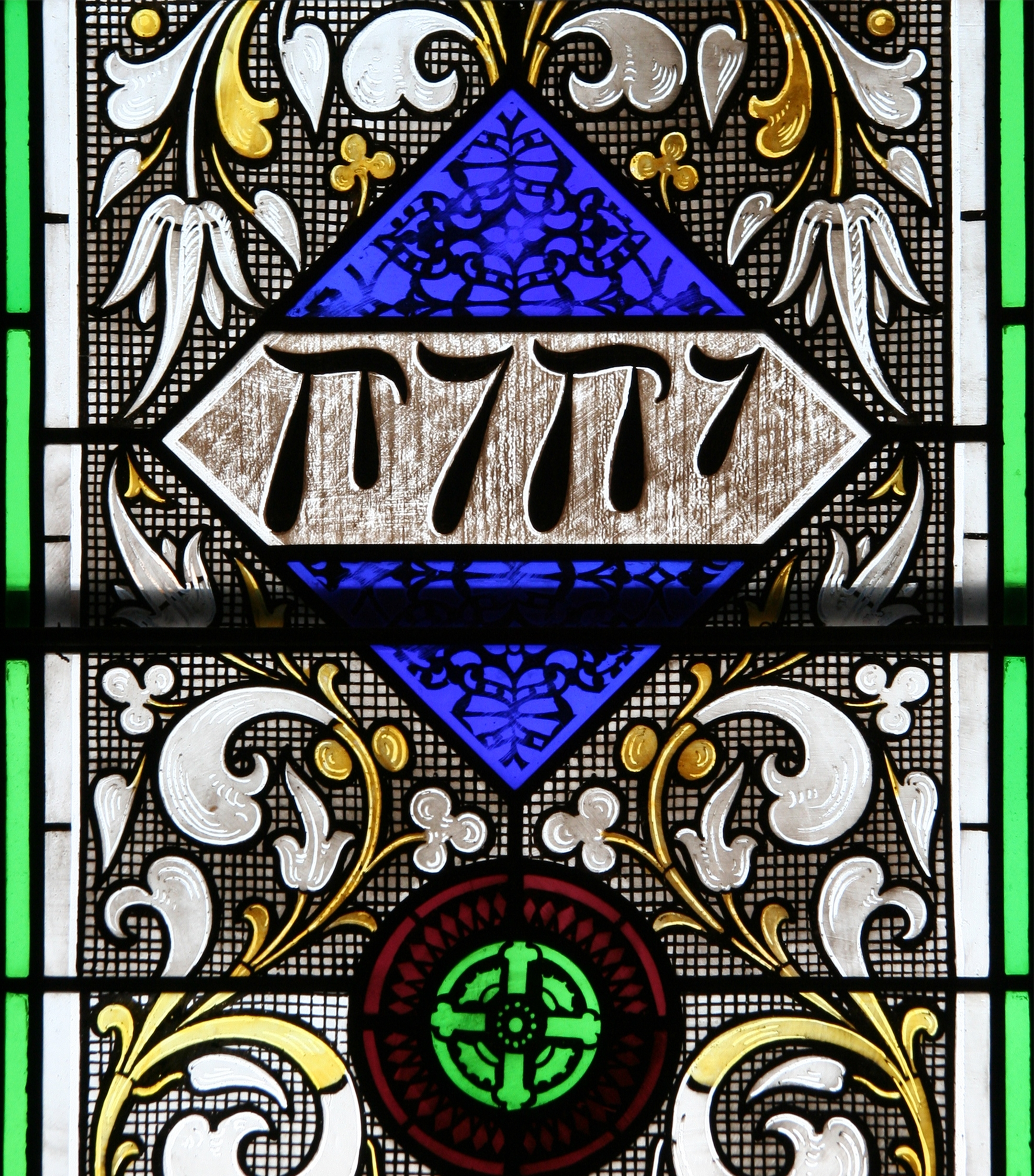
The Tetragrammaton as represented in stained glass in an 1868 Episcopal Church in Iowa

It is assumed that early Jewish Christians inherited from Jews the practice of reading "Lord" where the Tetragrammaton appears in the Hebrew text (and where a few Greek manuscripts use it in the midst of their Greek translation). Gentile Christians, primarily non-Hebrew speaking and using Greek Scripture texts, may have read Κύριος ("Lord"), as in the Greek text of the New Testament and in their copies of the Septuagint, the Greek translation of the Hebrew Old Testament. Here, the Greek translation corresponds to the Hebrew word אדון ("Lord"), which is extensively used in the Old Testament, especially in the possessive form אדוני ("My Lord"). This practice continued into the Latin Vulgate where Dominus ("Lord") represented the Tetragrammaton in the Latin text. At the Reformation, the Luther Bible used all-caps HERR ("LORD") in the German text of the Old Testament to represent the Tetragrammaton.

In Christianity, when the Tetragrammaton is vocalized, the forms Yahweh or Jehovah are used. Jah or Yah is an abbreviation of Jahweh/Yahweh, and often sees usage by Christians in the interjection "Hallelujah", meaning "Praise Jah", which is used to give God glory.

==== Christian translations ====
The Septuagint (Greek translation), the Vulgate (Latin translation), and the Peshitta (Syriac translation) use the word "Lord" (κύριος, kyrios, dominus, and ܡܳܪܝܳܐ, moryo respectively).

Use of the Septuagint by Christians in polemics with Jews led to its abandonment by the latter, making it a specifically Christian text. From it Christians made translations into Coptic, Arabic, Slavonic and other languages used in Oriental Orthodoxy and the Eastern Orthodox Church, whose liturgies and doctrinal declarations are largely a cento of texts from the Septuagint, which they consider to be inspired at least as much as the Masoretic Text. Within the Eastern Orthodox Church, the Greek text remains the norm for texts in all languages, with particular reference to the wording used in prayers.

The Septuagint, with its use of Κύριος to represent the Tetragrammaton, was the basis also for Christian translations associated with the West, in particular the Vetus Itala, which survives in some parts of the liturgy of the Latin Church, and the Gothic Bible.

Christian translations of the Bible into English commonly use "LORD" in place of the Tetragrammaton in most passages, often in all caps to refer to Jehovah God. This distinguishes the Tetragrammaton LORD from references to Jesus Christ as "Lord". The distinction is necessary to understand King James Psalm 110:1 "The LORD said unto my Lord, Sit thou at my right hand, until I make thine enemies thy footstool."

==== Eastern Orthodoxy ====
The Eastern Orthodox Church considers the Septuagint text, which uses Κύριος (Lord), to be the authoritative text of the Old Testament, and in its liturgical books and prayers it uses Κύριος in place of the Tetragrammaton in texts derived from the Bible.

==== Catholicism ====
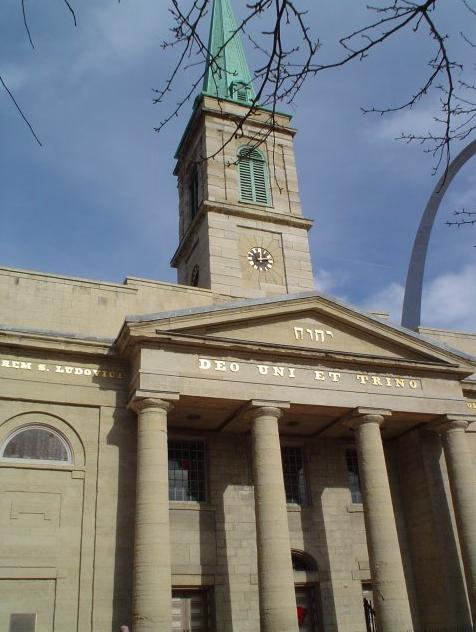
The Tetragrammaton on the Tympanum of the Roman Catholic Basilica of St. Louis, King of France in Missouri

In the Catholic Church, the first edition of the official Vatican Nova Vulgata Bibliorum Sacrorum Editio, editio typica, published in 1979, used the traditional Dominus when rendering the Tetragrammaton in the overwhelming majority of places where it appears; however, it also used the form Iahveh for rendering the Tetragrammaton in three known places:

- Exodus 3:15
- Exodus 15:3
- Exodus 17:15

In the second edition of the Nova Vulgata Bibliorum Sacrorum Editio, editio typica altera, published in 1986, these few occurrences of the form Iahveh were replaced with Dominus, in keeping with the long-standing Catholic tradition of avoiding direct usage of the Ineffable Name.

On 29 June 2008, the Holy See reacted to the then still recent practice of pronouncing, within Catholic liturgy, the name of God represented by the Tetragrammaton. As examples of such vocalisation it mentioned "Yahweh" and "Yehovah". The early Christians, it said, followed the example of the Septuagint in replacing the name of God with "the Lord", a practice with important theological implications for their use of "the Lord" in reference to Jesus, as in Philippians 2:9–11 and other New Testament texts. It therefore directed that, "in liturgical celebrations, in songs and prayers the name of God in the form of the Tetragrammaton YHWH is neither to be used or pronounced"; and that translations of Biblical texts for liturgical use are to follow the practice of the Greek Septuagint and the Latin Vulgate, replacing the divine name with "the Lord" or, in some contexts, "God". The United States Conference of Catholic Bishops welcomed this instruction, adding that it "provides also an opportunity to offer catechesis for the faithful as an encouragement to show reverence for the Name of God in daily life, emphasizing the power of language as an act of devotion and worship".

==== Lutheranism and Anglicanism ====
In the Lutheran and Anglican psalters, the word LORD in small capital letters is used to represent the personal name of the deity. However, the Psalter of the 1979 Book of Common Prayer used by the Protestant Episcopal Church of the United States of America uses Yahweh in two places, Psalms 68:4 and Psalms 83:18. Also the Hymnal 1982 as used by the Episcopal Church uses the hymn, "Guide me, O thou great Jehovah", Hymn 690 The Christian Life. Aside from those instances, LORD is typically used in the Liturgy of the Episcopal Church.

==== Translations preserving Hebraic form of Tetragrammaton ====
Since 1950, there are a number of Sacred Name Bibles that have been translated with the conviction that Hebraic forms for the Tetragrammaton and other divine names should be preserved in translating both Hebrew and Greek Scriptures. They have done this by transliteration or the use of Hebrew letters in the text. At least one even uses Paleo-Hebrew letters to write these names, such as The Besorah.

=== Islam ===
While the Qur'an does not explicitly mention the tetragrammaton, it appears to be well-aware of the name reflecting knowledge of its meaning, paralleling interpretations from early rabbinic traditions. The absence of the tetragrammaton may point to the Qur'an's oral transmission, especially since it sometimes replaces the tetragrammaton with "Lord" (Arabic: رب, romanized: Rabb) when it re-articulates passages in the Hebrew Bible that contain the tetragrammaton. Thus, the Qur'an appears to also avoid the vocalization of the tetragrammaton no differently than the Jewish communities with whom it was in conversation during Late Antiquity.

== Usage in art ==
Since the 16th century, artists have been using the tetragrammaton as a symbol for God, or for divine illumination. Protestant artists avoided to allegorize God in human form, but rather wrote the Hebrew name of God. This was done in book illustrations since 1530, then on coins and medals as well. Since the 17th century, both Protestant and Catholic artists have used the tetragrammaton in church decoration, on top of altars, or in center of frescos, often in rays of light or in a triangle.

== See also ==
- Allah (the common Arabic word for God)
- I Am that I Am
- Muqattaʿat
- Names of God
- Names and titles of God in the New Testament
- List of Tetragrammatons in art in Austria
