= Geoffrey H. Parke-Taylor =

- Born: 1920
- Died: 11 May 2009 (aged 88–89)
- Awards: Scott Award (2001)

Academic background
- Education: Wycliffe College
- Thesis: Forensic and non-forensic elements in St. Paul's ideas of justification and righteousness

Academic work
- Discipline: theology
- Institutions: Wycliffe College; Anglican Theological College; Huron University College
- Main interests: Old Testament
- Notable works: The Formation of the Book of Jeremiah: Doublets and Recurring Phrases

Geoffrey Howard Parke-Taylor (1920 – 11 May 2009) was a Canadian professor in the fields of Old Testament and Hebrew at Wycliffe College, Anglican Theological College and Huron University College. He also was Dean of Theology at Huron University College.

== Education ==
Geoffrey H. Parke-Taylor earned his B.A. and M.A. at Toronto. He also holds a LTh., B.D. and his Doctorate of Divinity with his thesis entitled Forensic and non-forensic elements in St. Paul's ideas of justification and righteousness, at Wycliffe College. He was awarded honorary doctorates from Trinity College and Huron College.

== Awards ==
- In 2001 Parke-Taylor won the Scott Award with his book The Formation of the Book of Jeremiah: Doublets and Recurring Phrases, in which he identifies instances in which the same prophet wrote the book.
- Doctor honoris causa at Trinity College and at Huron University.

== Bibliography ==
=== Thesis ===
- Geoffrey H Parke-Taylor (1966). Forensic and non-forensic elements in St. Paul's ideas of justification and righteousness (Th. D. General Synod of the Anglican Church of Canada 1966). London, Ont.: [publisher not identified]. OCLC 977809282.

=== Books ===
- G. H. Parke-Taylor (1975). (Yehovah) = Yahweh : the divine name in the Bible. Waterloo, Ont.: Wilfrid Laurier University Press. ISBN 0-88920-013-0. OCLC 1005663988.
- Geoffrey H Parke-Taylor (2000). The formation of the book of Jeremiah: doublets and recurring phrases. Monograph series (Society of Biblical Literature). Vol. 51. Atlanta, Ga.: Society of Biblical Literature. ISBN 1589833945. OCLC 43656993.

== Book reviews ==
- Boadt, Lawrence (1976). "Yahweh: The Divine Name in the Bibleby G. H. Parke-Taylor". The Catholic Biblical Quarterly. 38 (4): 583–84. JSTOR 43714438.
- Huffmon, Herbert B. (1977). "Yahweh: The Divine Name in the Bibleby G. H. Parke-Taylor". Journal of Biblical Literature. 96 (4): 580–81. doi:10.2307/3266002. JSTOR 3266002.
- Barton, John (1977). "Yahweh: The Divine Name in the Bibleby G. H. Parke-Taylor". The Journal of Theological Studies. 28 (1): 276–276. JSTOR 23960480.
- Lang, Bernard (2002). "Old Testament Exegesis § 450 Geoffrey H. Parke-Taylor, The Formation of the Book of Jeremiah: Doublets and Recurring Phrases". In Lang, Bernhard (ed.). International Review of Biblical Studies, Volume 47 (2000-2001). Biblical Studies and Religious Studies. Vol. 47. BRILL. pp. 111–112. doi:10.1163/9789004496644_006. ISBN 978-90-04-12503-2.
- Rollston, Christopher A. (2003). "The Formation of the Book of Jeremiah: Doublets and Recurring Phrases. By Geoffrey H. Parke‐Taylor. Society of Biblical Literature, Monograph Series, no. 51. Atlanta: Society of Biblical Literature. Pp. xviii + 327. $45". Journal of Near Eastern Studies. 62 (4). Johnson City, Tennessee: Emmanuel School of Religion: 301–302. doi:10.1086/380364.
- Wells, R. (2001). "Reviewed Work: The Formation of the Book of Jeremiah: Doublets and Recurring Phrases by Geoffrey H. Parke-Taylor". Journal of Biblical Literature. 120 (4): 748–751. doi:10.2307/3268273. JSTOR 3268273.
