= Martin Rösel =

German protestant theologian

- Born: September 8, 1961 (age 65); Essen

Academic background
- Education: University of Hamburg

Academic work
- Discipline: theology
- Institutions: University of Rostock

Martin Rösel (born September 8, 1961, in Essen) is a German protestant theologian of Old Testament and professor at the University of Rostock.

== Life ==
=== Education ===
In 1993 he received his doctorate in University of Hamburg and was then Academic Councilor for Hebrew and Old Testament at the University of Rostock. From 1999 he holds his habilitation in Old Testament earned at the University of Hamburg.

=== Teaching ===
In 2007 he was awarded the title of professor by the University of Hamburg and in 2010 he was rehabilitated at the University of Rostock.

== Research ==
His research focuses on the processing of the Book of Numbers, the Book of Daniel, the translation of the Septuagint into German and collaboration on the project "Episteme der Theologie Interreligios", which is intended to promote interreligious dialogue.

== Bibliography ==
=== Theses ===
- Rösel, Martin (1994). Übersetzung als Vollendung der Auslegung (Dissertation, Universität Hamburg, 1993). Studien zur Genesis-Septuaginta. De Gruyter. doi:10.1515/9783110877014. ISBN 978-3-11-014234-1.
- Rösel, Martin (2000). Adonaj: warum gott "herr" genannt wird (dissertation). Mohr Siebeck. OCLC 466986533.

=== Books ===
- Adonaj, warum Gott" Herr" genannt wird. 2000.
- Towards a "Theology of the Septuagint".

=== Articles ===
- "Israels Psalmen in Ägypten? Papyrus Amherst 63 und die Psalmen xx und lxxv". Vetus Testamentum. Brill. 2000.
- Rösel, Martin (2007). "The reading and translation of the divine name in the Masoretic tradition and the Greek Pentateuch". Journal for the Study of the Old Testament. 31 (4): 411–428. doi:10.1177/0309089207080558. S2CID 170886081.
