= Patrick W. Skehan =

American Old Testament semitic scholar (1909–1980)

- Born: September 30, 1909; New York
- Died: September 9, 1980; Washington, D.C.
- Education: Fordham University, St. Joseph's Seminary and College
- Occupations: University teacher, Hebrew Bible scholar, director, linguist, theologian, Catholic theologian
- Employers: Catholic University of America; Johns Hopkins University (1947–1956); Pontifical Biblical Institute (1969–1970)

Patrick William Skehan (September 30, 1909 in New York City – September 9, 1980) was an American Old Testament semitic scholar.

== Education ==
Skehan received his B.A. from Fordham University (1929), and studied theology at St. Joseph's Seminary (known as Dunwoodie). He studied Scripture and Semitic Languages at Catholic University of America, Washington, DC, where he earned his doctorate and obtained a Doctor of Sacred Theology in the Old Testament (1938). His doctoral advisor was Edward P. Arbez, and his dissertation for his doctorate in Sacred Theology was entitled The Literary Relationship Between the Book of Wisdom and the Protocanonical Wisdom Books of the Old Testament.

== Religious order ==
He was ordained as a priest in the Catholic Church and received his ordination at St. Joseph's Seminary on September 23, 1933.

== Academic work ==
He was the Chair of the Department of Semitic and Egyptian Languages and Literatures at The Catholic University of America, Washington, D.C. He was appointed Secretary of the Advisory Committee for the Corpus Scriptorum Christianorum Orientalium (C.S.C.O.).

=== Teaching ===
He taught Hebrew Hebrew, Aramaic, and Syriac at the Department of Semitic and Egyptian Languages and Literatures at the Catholic University of America, and a visiting professor at the Pontifical Biblical Institute in Rome.

=== Editorial work ===
Skehan participated in the translation of the New American Bible. He was the associate editor on several occasions of the Catholic Biblical Quarterly, associate editor of Old Testament Abstracts, and editor of the association's monograph series (1973–75). He also worked on the New Catholic Encyclopedia.

=== Archaeological ===
In 1947, when William Foxwell Albright conducted an archaeological exploration in Egypt, he asked Skehan to be a visiting lecturer in his place at Johns Hopkins. He agreed and did this for Albright on other occasions between 1947 and 1956. Skehan was also a guest professor during the 1969–1970 academic year at the Pontifical Biblical Institute in Rome.

In 1953, Skehan was chosen as a member of the Dead Sea Scrolls editorial team, along with Frank Moore Cross, John Allegro, John Strugnell, Dominique Barthélemy, Jean Starcky, Claus-Hunno Hunziger, Josef T. Milik, and Roland de Vaux who was the project director.

=== Organizations ===
Skehan was involved with many organizations and their projects including the Catholic Biblical Association, the Confraternity of Christian Doctrine, the American Schools of Oriental Research, the American Oriental Society, and the Pontifical Biblical Commission.

== Recognitions and distinctions ==
Skehan's work and contribution to the study of Scripture was recognized and honored by the Holy See. He was named Monsignor by Pope Pius XII on June 17, 1954, appointed Domestic Prelate by Pope John XXIII on December 2, 1958, and awarded Benemerenti Medal by Pope Paul VI on December 29, 1964.

In 1974 The Catholic Biblical Quarterly issued a festschrift in his honor, edited by one of his students, Roland E. Murphy (O.Carm.). One of his students, Alexander A. Di Lella (O.F.M.), wrote a tribute to him published in The Catholic Biblical Quarterly. Of his teacher Di Lella says: "He was more than a dedicated teacher and scholar. He was above all a loyal churchman and devout priest, a Christian gentleman, and a superlative human being."

== Works ==
=== Thesis ===
- Patrick W Skehan (1938). The literary relationship between the Book of Wisdom and the Protocanonical Wisdom Books of the Old Testament. Catholic University of America, School of Sacred Theology, studies in sacred theology. Vol. 54. Washington, Catholic University of America Press. OCLC 371202.

=== Books ===
- Studies in Israelite poetry and wisdom. Catholic Biblical quarterly: Monograph series. Washington: Catholic Biblical Association of America. 1971. ISBN 9780915170005. OCLC 154986.
- Patrick W. Skehan festschrift. Catholic Biblical quarterly. Vol. 36. Washington, D.C.: Catholic Biblical Association of America. 1974. OCLC 12984798.
- The Wisdom of Ben Sira: a new translation with notes by Patrick W Skehan. Bible. Vol. 39. New York: Doubleday. 1987. ISBN 9780385510042. OCLC 13525398.
- Qumran cave 4. IV: Palaeo-Hebrew and Greek biblical manuscripts. Discoveries in the Judaean desert. Vol. 9. Oxford: Clarendon Press. 1992. ISBN 9780198263289. OCLC 27900865.
- Qumran cave 4. 13 The Damascus document (4Q266-273). Discoveries in the Judaean desert. Vol. 18. Oxford Clarendon Press. 1996.

== See also ==
- List of Catholic University of America people
- Discoveries in the Judaean Desert

== Sources ==
- Alexander A. Di Lella, O.F.M. (October 1980). "Patrick William Skehan: A Tribute". The Catholic Biblical Quarterly. 42 (4): 435–437. JSTOR 43718832.
- Skehan, Patrick William (1971). Studies in Israelite Poetry and Wisdom. Catholic Biblical Quarterly Monograph Series. Vol. 1. Wash., D.C.: Catholic Biblical Association of America. pp. 254–260. ISBN 9780915170005.
- "Bibliography of the Published Works by Patrick William Skehan". The Catholic Biblical Quarterly. 43 (1). Catholic Biblical Association: 96–99. 1981. JSTOR 43715980.
- Montague, George T. (October 1974). "Patrick W. Skehan Festschrift". The Catholic Biblical Quarterly. 36 (4). JSTOR 43715438.
