= Ronald L. Troxel =

Semitic languages scholar

- Born: 2 April 1951
- Education: University of Wisconsin–Madison
- Occupations: University teacher, Semitist, biblical scholar
- Employer: University of Wisconsin–Madison

Ronald Lewis Troxel (born April 2, 1951) is a retired professor emeritus and Chair of the Department of Hebrew and Semitic Studies at the University of Wisconsin-Madison.

== Life ==
=== Education ===
On May 27, 1973, Troxel was awarded a B.A. from Bethel University (Minnesota). On May 28, 1977, Troxel earned a M.Div., from Bethel Theological Seminary, St. Paul, MN. On December 22, 1985, he earned the M.A., University of Wisconsin-Madison. On August 27, 1989, Troxel successfully defended his dissertation, earning a Ph.D. from University of Wisconsin-Madison. The title of his doctoral dissertation was Eschatology in the Septuagint of Isaiah.

=== Teaching ===
In 1991, he began teaching at the University of Wisconsin-Madison as a lecturer. He became an Associate Professor (with tenure) in 2011, and was promoted to full professor in 2014. From January, 2010 through May, 2014 he served as chair of the Department of Hebrew and Semitic Studies. From 2002 until 2007 he served as advisor for the nascent Religious Studies Program. After the program became an established major, he served as its Coordinator of Undergraduate Education from 2008 until 2010.

He regularly presented research in sessions of the Society of Biblical Literature, both in the United States annual meetings and European meetings. Upon his retirement in May 2016, he became Professor Emeritus of Hebrew Bible in the Department of Classical and Ancient Near Eastern Studies at University of Wisconsin-Madison.

=== Awards ===
- In 2004 he was awarded the Chancellor’s Award for Excellence in Research
- In 2009, received the Honored Instructor Award, from University Housing and the Chadbourne Residential College (distinguished senior lecturer of Hebrew Bible), the University of Wisconsin–Madison, and the Honored Instructor Award, from the Panhellenic Association, the University of Wisconsin–Madison.

== Works ==
=== Thesis ===
- Troxel, Ronald L. (1989). Eschatology in the Septuagint of Isaiah (Ph. D. thesis). University of Wisconsin-Madison. OCLC 233921868.

=== Books ===
- ———————; Friebel, Kelvin G.; Magary, Dennis Robert (2005). Seeking out the wisdom of the ancients: essays offered to honor Michael V. Fox on the occasion of his sixty-fifth birthday. Winona Lake, IN: Eisenbrauns. ISBN 978-1-57506-562-5. OCLC 747412048.
- ——————— (2008). LXX-Isaiah as Translation and Interpretation: The Strategies of the Translator of the Septuagint of Isaiah. Leiden: E. J. Brill. ISBN 978-90-04-15394-3.
- ——————— (2011). Prophetic Literature: From Oracles to Books. John Wiley & Sons. ISBN 978-1-4443-5413-3.
- ——————— (2015). Joel: Scope, Genres, and Meaning. Critical Studies in the Hebrew Bible. Winona Lake, IN: Eisenbrauns. ISBN 978-1-57506-381-2.
- ——————— (2022). A Commentary on the Old Greek and Peshiṭta of Isaiah 1-25. TCS. Vol. 13. SBL Press. ISBN 978-1-62837-275-5.

=== Book chapters ===
- ——————— (2010). "The Use of βουλή in LXX-Isaiah". In Van der Kooij, Arie; Van der Meer, Michael (eds.). The Old Greek of Isaiah: Issues and Perspectives. Leuven: Peeters. pp. 1–53. ISBN 978-90-429-2351-5.
- ——————— (2021). "Textual Criticism and Diachronic Study of the Book of Isaiah". In Hibbard, Todd; Stromberg, Jacob (eds.). The History of Isaiah: The Making of the Book and its Presentation of the Past. Tübingen: Mohr Siebeck. pp. 159–178. ISBN 978-3-16-156097-2.
- ——————— (2024-11-08). "Translating Isaiah". In Hays, Christopher B. (ed.). The Cambridge Companion to Isaiah. Cambridge Companions to Religion. Cambridge University Press. doi:10.1017/9781108692809. ISBN 9781108692809.

=== Articles ===
- Troxel, Ronald L. (1992). "Εσχατος and Eschatology in LXX-Isa". Bulletin of the International Organization for Septuagint and Cognate Studies. 25: 18–27.
- Troxel, Ronald L. (1993). "Exegesis and Theology in the LXX: Isaiah v 26-30". Vetus Testamentum. 43: 102–111. doi:10.1163/156853393X00322.
- Troxel, Ronald L. (2001-12-19). "Matt 27.51–4 Reconsidered: Its Role in the Passion Narrative, Meaning and Origin". New Testament Studies. 48 (1): 30–47. doi:10.1017/S0028688502000036. S2CID 170935143.
- Troxel, Ronald L. (2002). "Economic Plunder as a Leitmotif in LXX-Isaiah". Biblica. 83 (3). Peeters Publishers: 375–391. JSTOR 42614384.
- Troxel, Ronald L. (2003). "Isaiah 7:14-16 through the Eyes of the Septuagint". Ephemerides Theologicae Lovanienses. 79: 1–19. doi:10.2143/ETL.79.1.608.
- Troxel, Ronald L. (2013). "The Problem of Time in the Book of Joel". Journal of Biblical Literature. 132 (1): 77–95. doi:10.2307/23488238. JSTOR 23488238.
- Troxel, Ronald L. (2013). "Confirming Coherence in Joel 3 with Cognitive Grammar". Zeitschrift für die alttestamentiliche Wissenschaft. 125: 578–592.
- Troxel, Ronald L. (2015). "The Fate of Joel in the Redaction of the Twelve". Currents in Biblical Research. 13 (2): 152–174. doi:10.1177/1476993X13519888.
- Troxel, Ronald L. (2016). "What is the 'Text' in Textual Criticism?". Vetus Testamentum. 66 (3): 603–626. doi:10.1163/15685330-12341249.
- Troxel, Ronald L. (2017). "Writing a Commentary on the Life of the Text". Vetus Testamentum. 67 (1): 105–128. doi:10.1163/15685330-12341253.
