= Traudl Wallbrecher =

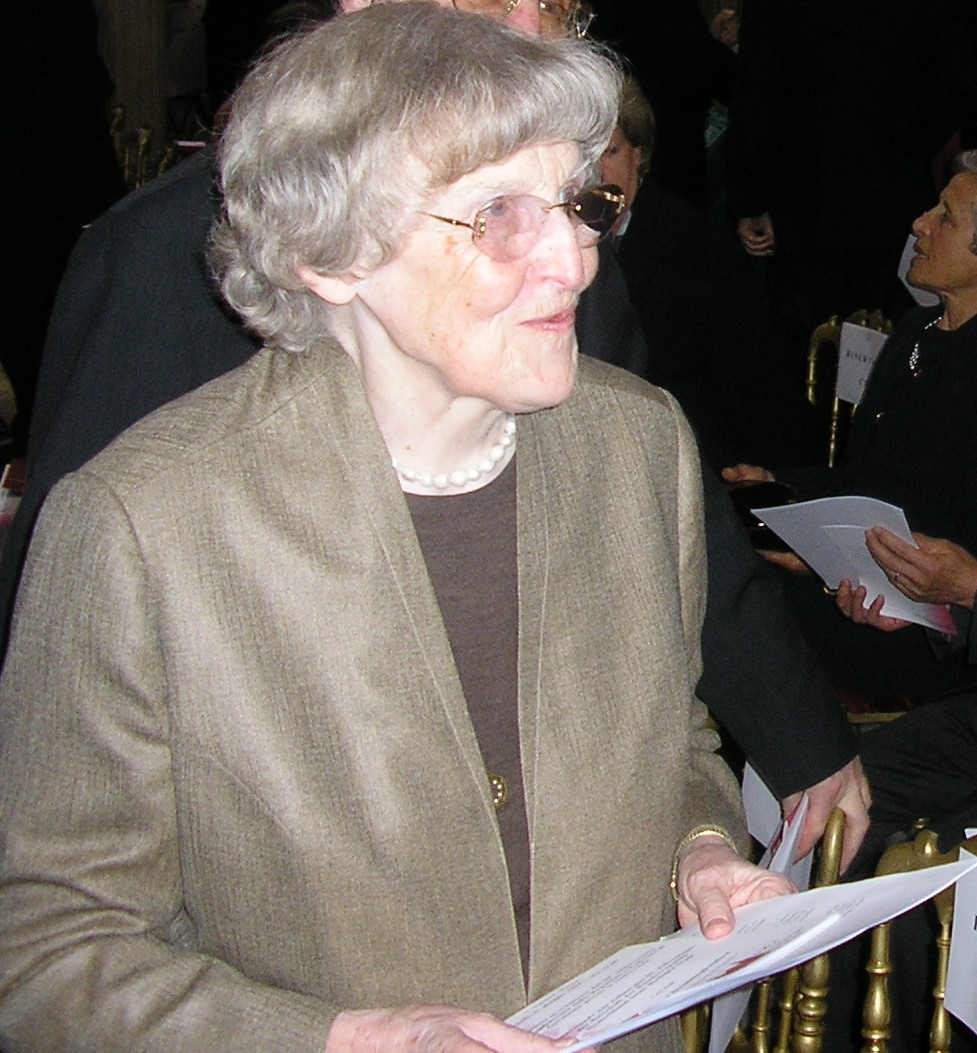
Wallbrecher in 2004

Gertraud “Traudl” Wallbrecher (née Weiß; 18 May 1923 in Munich – 29 July 2016 in Munich), a representative of the Catholic avant-garde of the 20th century, was the initiator of the Catholic Integrated Community, which she established with her husband, Herbert Wallbrecher (1922–1997), after the Second World War.

== Work and life ==
Weiß grew up in Munich-Schwabing. From age 13, she belonged to the Catholic Heliand League. After auxiliary service in the war, she began studying psychology at the Ludwig-Maximilians-Universität München, and from 1943 onwards she attended the Social Women's School. As a nurse, she was obligated to work in the service in 1945 and experienced the dissolution of the Dachau concentration camp first-hand.

From 1945, she was the leader of Heliand. At the nationwide meeting in Telgte near Münster in 1947, she unsettled the assembled people with the question of what the Shoah catastrophe meant for the church and its mission. As a consequence, she left the Heliand in 1948 and started the group "Junger Bund". Among others, she was encouraged to do so by theologian professor Michael Schmaus. The priest Dr. Aloys Goergen supported the group until 1968.

In 1949, Weiß married the lawyer Herbert Wallbrecher from Hagen in Westphalia, who belonged to the Catholic "Bund Neudeutschland." They had four children. With him and his friend Johannes Joachim Degenhardt, the latter Cardinal and archbishop of Paderborn, she found two allies. The Integrated Community was formed by the people who gathered around Traudl Wallbrecher, her husband and Aloys Goergen.

As editor of the magazine "Die Integrierte Gemeinde," Wallbrecher aroused the interest of agnostics like Gerhard Szczesny and theologians like Joseph Ratzinger, who supported the path of the KIG within the Catholic Church since then. She gained ideas for the "community" experiment in 1965 on a trip to kibbutzim in Israel. Through the friendship with Chaim Seeligmann, this resulted in an intensive exchange, which eventually led to the founding of the "Urfelder Kreis" in 1995. American Hutterites and German Bruderhofers were also drawn to attention. In the US, Wallbrecher won religious Jews as friends, such as the writer Zvi Kolitz and the director of the New York Yeshiva University, Norman Lamm.

Together with her husband, she founded the private Günter-Stöhr-Gymnasium in 1977, which is now one of the schools in the St. Anna school network. Since 1978, an Integrated Community in Africa has developed from her encounter with Bishop Christopher Mwoleka in Tanzania.

One of her greatest concerns was the theology, which had grown from the new experience of the Church. To address this, two New Testament exegetes, Rudolf Pesch and Gerhard Lohfink gave up their professorships in the 1980s and joined the Integrated Community. A chair called "Cattedra per la Teologia del Popolo di Dio" was established at the Lateran University in Rome in 2008 following Wallbrecher's initiative of the "Academy for the Theology of the People of God" in the Villa Cavalletti near Frascati; since September 2016, the chair has offered the post-graduate distance learning module "The Profile of the Jewish Christian," which began in English in September 2017.

On 29 July 2016, Gertraud Wallbrecher died in Munich at the age of 93 after a prolonged illness. The Italian newspaper "Avennire" (9 August 2016) captioned its obituary "Addio a Gertrude Wallbrecher, 'teologa' del popolo di Dio."

== Writings ==
- Traudl Wallbrecher (Hrsg.): Monatszeitschrift HEUTE in Kirche und Welt. (2000–2008) ISSN 1616-2293.
- Traudl Wallbrecher (Ed.), TODAY pro ecclesia viva, (English edition of HEUTE pro ecclesia viva ISSN 0946-6401), Bad Tölz 1996
- Traudl Wallbrecher, Ludwig Weimer, Arnold Stötzel (Hrsg.): 30 Jahre Wegbegleitung – Joseph Ratzinger/Papst Benedikt XVI. und die Katholische Integrierte Gemeinde. Verlag Urfeld, Bad Tölz 2006, ISBN 978-3-932857-40-9 .
- Traudl Wallbrecher, Ludwig Weimer (Hrsg.): Katholische Integrierte Gemeinde. Eine Kurzdarstellung. Verlag Urfeld, Bad Tölz 2005, ISBN 978-3-932857-45-4 .
- Traudl Wallbrecher (Hrsg.): Die Integrierte Gemeinde. Beiträge zur Reform der Kirche. 18 Bände, Verlag Urfeld, München (1969–1976).
- Joseph Kardinal Ratzinger: Skandalöser Realismus? – Gott handelt in der Geschichte. Verlag Urfeld 2005, Preface from Traudl Wallbrecher, ISBN 3-932857-44-5 .
- Traudl Wallbrecher (Hrsg.): Ecclesiae Solamen – Gedanken zur Theologie Johann Adam Möhlers. Verlag Urfeld 1982.
- Traudl Wallbrecher: Das Vaterunser und die Weitergabe des Glaubens. In: Heute in Kirche und Welt Heft 5/2008, ISSN 1616-2293, S. 13.
- Catholic Integrated Community (Hrsg.) Theologica No. 3 – Englisch Edition: 'Teologa' del popolo di Dio. Gertraud Wallbrecher (1923–2016), Baierbrunn 2016, ISBN 978-3-946577-03-4
