= Lohfink =

Lohfink is a surname. Notable people with the surname include:

- Gerhard Lohfink (1934–2024), German Catholic priest and theologian
- Gina-Lisa Lohfink (born 1986), German television and media personality
- Norbert Lohfink (1928–2024), German Catholic priest and theologian
