= Greek Minor Prophets Scroll from Nahal Hever =

First-century Jewish text found at Nahal Hever

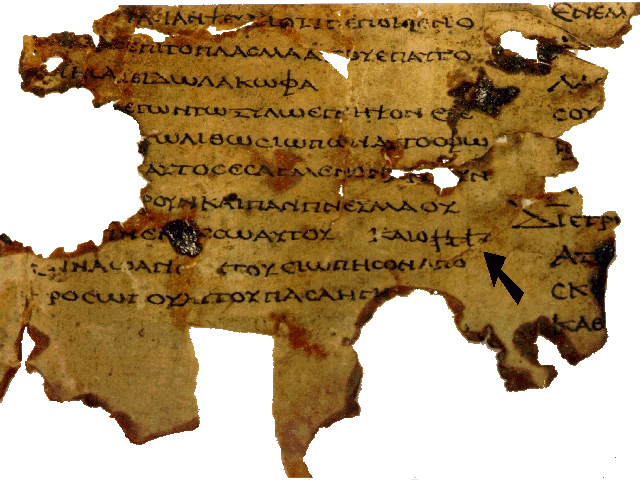
Lower part of col. 18 (according to E. Tov) of the Greek Minor Prophets Scroll from Nahal Hever (8HevXII gr). The arrow points at the divine name in paleo-Hebrew script

The Greek Minor Prophets Scroll from Nahal Hever (8HevXII gr) is a Greek manuscript of a revision of the Septuagint dated to the 1st century BCE and the 1st century CE. The manuscript is kept in the Rockefeller Archeological Museum in Jerusalem. It was first published by Dominique Barthélemy in 1963. The Rahlfs-Siglum is 943.

== Discovery and history ==
In the 1st century CE, the 8HevXII gr with several documents was taken by Jewish fugitives (Bar Kokhba's troops, women and children) who were taking refuge in the Caves of Nahal Hever. After accepting their death, unable to leave because of the presence of Roman camps outside the caves, who besieged the inmates as a military camp located above the cave shows, the refugees decided to make a large bonfire and burn all their belongings, but buried the Greek Minor Prophets Scroll and other important documents between the rocks of the end chamber. Inside the caves, a burnt layer was found which suggests that the last inhabitants of the cave had burned all their possessions. The scroll had been buried, and other documents that would have provided information about other insurgents that wanted to destroy them so as not to let them fall into the hands of the Romans. This practice is mainly known from the later Jewish tradition (Geniza), but was also observed in this twelve-prophet scroll apparently from Wadi Murabba'at.

Between 1946 and 1947 the Dead Sea Scrolls were discovered by Bedouins. Since 1948, Nahal Hever has been part of Israel, but the Bedouins reported that the manuscripts came from Wadi Seiyal (known in Hebrew as Nahal Tze'elim) some 9 km further south (which Flint and Alvarez, the authors of the article dealing with it, claim was in Jordan), to legitimize their possession. Due to the excavations of the Bedouins, the archaeological context could no longer be determined. The Bedouins sold their finds to researchers in East Jerusalem, which was under Jordanian control at the time, as was Wadi Seiyal, while the caves in Nahal Hever were in Israel.

From 1952 to 1954 the manuscripts that comprised what was known as the Seiyâl collection was acquired by the Palestine Archaeological Museum (today is Rockefeller Museum), from clandestine excavators. Among the fragments were also parts of a scroll of the Twelve Prophets book, and were catalogued as Se2grXII (Seiyâl Collection No. 2).

In 1953, scarcely a year after the Bedouin had brought these materials to the École biblique et archéologique française in Jordanian Jerusalem, Dominique Barthélemy published a "brief analysis of the fragments" in French of the Greek Minor Prophets scroll from the then "unknown provenance" somewhere south of Wadi Murabba'at.

Amongst other things, in response to rumors that parts of the sold scrolls came from Israel, Hebrew University of Jerusalem sent two expeditions, in 1960 and 1961, for exploration through the Wadi to the west of the Dead Sea. In the expedition B of the company in spring 1961 under the direction of Yohanan Aharoni, who examined mainly the caves on the southern edge of Nahal Hever, in Cave no. 8 (known as the Cave of Horror) it found, among other things, fragments of the Greek scroll. Most of which only a few centimeters between large fragments could still be associated with the twelve minor prophets. It also became apparent relatively quickly that the fragments were parts of the same scroll that had been purchased ten years earlier. The locality of this role - as well as most of the other scrolls of the Seiyâl Collection - was therefore contrary to the specification of the Bedouin of the Nachal Hever determined previously.

The other fragments found in expedition B of the Hebrew University of Jerusalem in cave No. 8 in Nahal Hever (Judean Desert) named Cave of Horror, were examined by Baruch Lifshitz. Lifshitz published the Se2grXII fragments together with the other new fragments found in the Cave of Horror. In 1961 and 1962, Lifshitz published the fragments with photographs in Yediot and in Israel Exploration Journal which Emanuel Tov called "the first edition, still substandard". Tov wrote that "these small fragments were published by B. Lifshitz, "The Greek Documents from th Cave of Horror," IEJ 12 (1962) 201-7 as well as in a Hebrew Version." Lifshitz thinks that there are two apart manuscripts of the Greek Minor Prophets Scroll because repeated biblical verses appear in his textual identifications.

In 1963, Dominique Barthélemy published his preliminary study in French, and describes in detail the facts of the discovering of the scroll. Here he published the main text, but there are still some unidentified fragments.

In 1990, Emanuel Tov published the textual edition of the Greek Minor Prophets Scroll from Nahal Hever. Throughout studies of the fragments, and in reference works, acronyms such as Se2grXII, LXXIEJ12, LXXVTS10a, Rahlfs 493a, 8HevXIIa, LXXVTS10b, Rahlfs 493b, 8HevXIIa, Rahlfs 493 and 8HevXII have been used, so in 1990, Emanuel Tov, Robert A. Kraft and Peter J. Parsons recommend that scholars use the acronym 8HevXIIgr, becoming the modern sigla. Tov, as well as George Howard, agree that if Lifshitz's identifications are correct, then there are two manuscripts of the Minor Prophets.

=== New discovery 2021 ===
New fragments were found in 2021. These are being studied for the textual reconstruction of the manuscript.

== Description ==
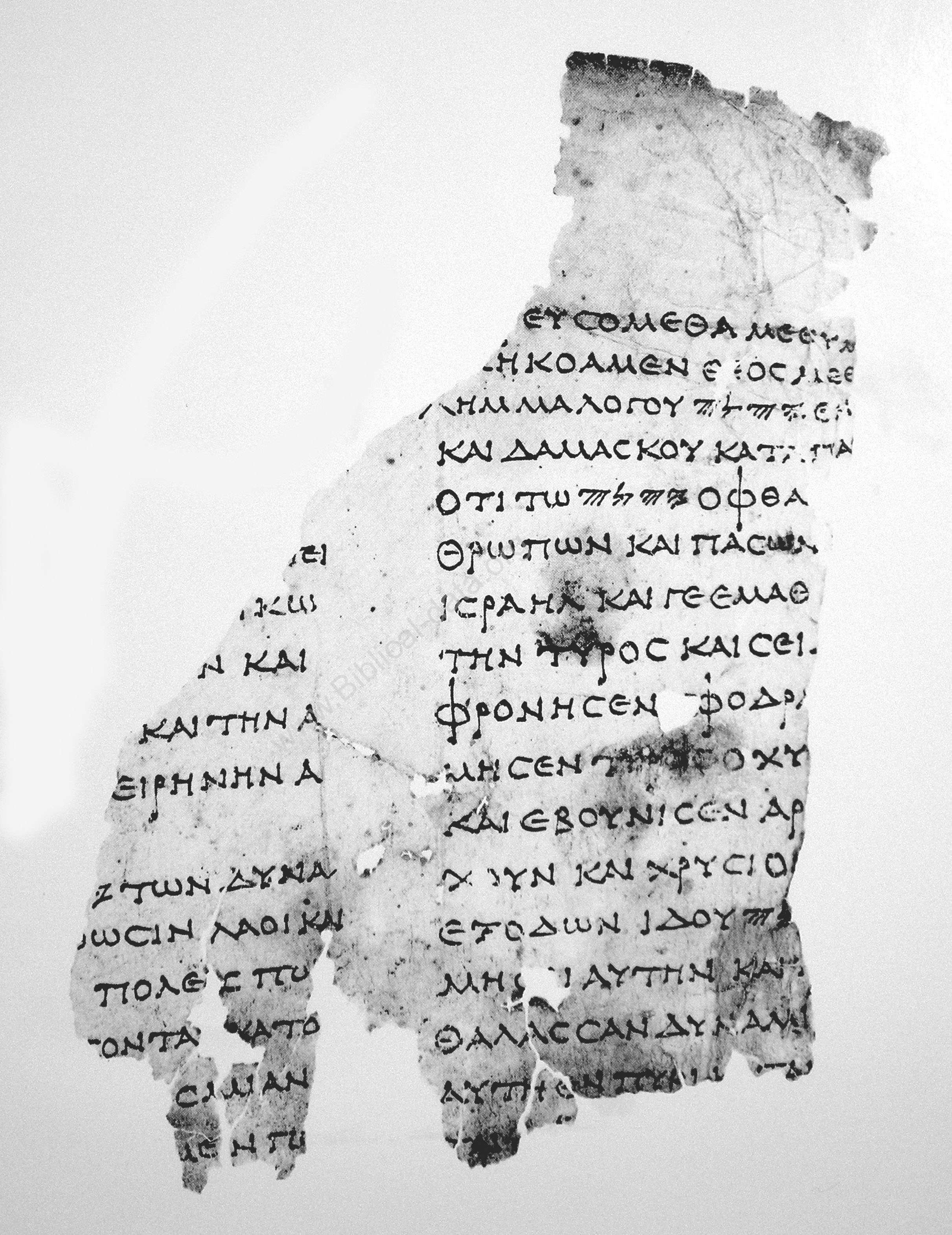
Col. B1–2 (according to E. Tov) of the Greek Minor Prophets Scroll from Nahal Hever (8HevXII gr).

=== Version ===
Since its discovery, the editors agree that this is an early revision of the Septuagint in alignment with the Hebrew text. Dominique Barthélemy established that text found "is neither a new translation nor an independent one, but rather a recension of the Septuagint text". According to Tuukka Kauhanen, a Postdoctoral Researcher at the Faculty of Theology at University of Helsinki, this manuscript is an early Hebraizing revision (i.e. in B-text of books such as Joshua, Judges, and Samuel-Kings), Eugene C. Ulrich wrote "attests the recension commonly referred to as Proto-Theodotion or καιγε" recension, which is reaffirmed by Pavlos D. Vasileiadis, a Doctor of Theology at the Aristotle University of Thessaloniki. James A.E. Mulroney quoting Emanuel Tov, Robert A. Kraft and Peter J. Parsons claim that "although 8HevXIIgr was a revision of OG towards the proto-MT, it retained significant continuity with the OG text… was a revision, not a new translation". David L. Washburn wrote that is a direct translation from an MT-type manuscript into Greek, i.e. not part of the Septuagint tradition.

=== Dimensions and content ===
The roll is only partially preserved, better in the lower part. Only column 8 contains parts of all four edges, from most other columns usually only the lower one as well, parts of the right or left edge. Reconstruction attempts show that the average number of lines per column is about 42. In contrast, in the back part, which can be assigned to another hand, the letters are written larger, and therefore the columns contain only 33 lines. The columns therefore had a height of about 27 cm. The column width, however, varies between 7.5 and 9 cm or 29 and 43 letters, in the back even only 22-24 letters. This is apparently related to the width of the individual leather sheets sewn together into a roll. While the sheets themselves were different in width, the columns appear to have been drawn relatively evenly on a sheet. The height of the roll can finally be determined with about 35 cm. Calculations on the number of columns depend very much on what content the roll had. Assuming an originally complete twelve-prophecy book, the roll should have included between 80 and 94 columns, which would correspond to about 9.6 – 10 m. The roll would be longer than any surviving scrolls from Qumran. However, only parts of the books Jonah, Micah, Nahum, Habakkuk, Zephaniah and Zechariah are identified.

=== Text and scribe ===
As differences in letter form and size show, the manuscript was written by two different scribes. On the other hand, the assumption that instead the fragments should be divided into two different roles is less likely. The cause of the various clerk hands, however, is unclear. Either the role was first started by a writer and later ended by a second, or else the leather sheets with the second manuscript were inserted for repair. Several lines have been left between the individual books, but possible book titles are not attested. The continuous text is divided into larger and smaller sections, and it is even possible to observe a division into verses. The division into units of meaning agrees largely with the division of the Masoretic Text in Setumot and Petuchot. To mark such sections, either draw a horizontal line between the lines - a paragraph - or the new line starts slightly to the left and with a slightly larger initial letter. Between individual words of a verse, however, at first hand there is usually no gap left.

=== Tetragrammaton ===
This manuscript shows the use of the tetragrammaton in Paleo-Hebrew form. Clearly Jewish manuscripts of Greek translations of the Old Testament (Septuagint, proto-Lucianic, kaige, the translations of Aquila of Sinope, Symmachus the Ebionite, Theodotion and the Hexapla) differ from clearly Christian manuscripts in not using Kύριος or the nomina sacra Θ̅ς̅ and κ̅ς̅ (with a horizontal line above the contracted words) to represent the Tetragrammaton. Papyrus Oxyrhynchus 1007 is in fact difficult to identify as either Christian or Jewish, as on the barely legible recto side (in Gen 2:18) it contains the nomen sacrum Θ̅Σ̅ (characteristic of Christian manuscripts) and the Tetragrammaton represented as a double yodh יי (characteristic of Jewish manuscripts). According to Edmon L. Gallagher, a faculty member of Heritage Christian University, "extant Greek manuscripts from Qumran and elsewhere that are unambiguously Jewish (because of the date) also include several ways of representing the Divine Name, none of which was with κύριος, the term used everywhere in our Christian manuscripts". He concludes that there is no certainty about whether it was a Jew or a Christian who transcribed the Cairo Genizah manuscripts of the Greek translation of the Hebrew Bible by Aquila (not the LXX), in which the Tetragrammaton is generally given in paleo-Hebrew letters but in one instance, where there was insufficient space at the end of a line, by κ̅υ̅, the nomen sacrum rendering of the genitive case of Κύριος. Jewish manuscripts, such as those found in Qumran, did not render it into Greek, but instead reproduced it within the Greek text in several different ways. Some gave it in either Hebrew, Aramaic or paleo-Hebrew letters. Others transliterated it in Greek characters as ΠΙΠΙ or ΙΑΩ.

In this manuscript the tetragrammaton in Old Hebrew script appears in Jon 3:3; Jon 4:2; Mic 1:1, 3; Mic 4:4, 5, 7; Mic 5:4, 4; Hab 2:14, 16, 20; Hab 3:9; Zep 1:3, 14; Zep 2:10; Zec 1:3, 3, 4; Zec 3:5, 6, 7; Zec 8:20; 9:1, 1, 4. The scribe himself seems to have inserted the paleo-Hebrew characters directly, probably from left to right, contrary to the normal direction for Hebrew, when writing the Greek text. George Howard states, in Journal of Biblical Literature (1977):

In 1952 fragments of a scroll of the Twelve Prophets in Greek were found in a cave in Nahal Hever in the Judean Desert. The first announcement, along with a brief analysis of the fragments, came from D. Barthelemy in 1953. Ten years later he published most of the fragments with a full analysis of the text and the place that it holds in the transmission history of the LXX. According to him the text belongs to a Kaige, recension portions of which appear elsewhere in the Greek Bible. Barthelemy dated the scroll toward the end of the first century A.D. But C. H. Roberts has preferred an earlier date, ascribing it to the century 50 B.C.-A.D. 50. Sometime around the beginning of the first Christian century is probably correct. The MS is distinguished for its closeness to MT against the Christian MSS of the LXX and for its preservation of the Tetragram where the Christian codices employ the word κυριος. It differs from P. Fuadd 266 in that it writes the Tetragram not in Aramaic letters, but in paleo-Hebrew letters. In 1962 B. Lifshitz published nine fragments of a Greek scroll which he believed to belong to Barthelemy's MS. According to Lifshitz's reconstructions they include: (1) Hos 2:8; (2) Amos 1:5; (3) Joel 1:14; (4) Jonah 3:2- 5; (5) Nah 1:9; (6) Nah 2:8-9; (7) Zech 3:1-2; (8) Zech 4:8-9; (9) Zech 8:21. Barthelemy accepted the fragments as belonging to his scroll but he did not agree with all of Lifshitz's identifications. In our judgment Lifshitz's identifications fit quite well with our LXX MSS with only few alterations in the direction of MT. If Lifshitz is correct, some of these fragments must not come from Barthelemy's scroll, but from another MS of the Twelve Prophets in Greek, since Lifshitz's fragments overlap twice with the fragments published by Barthelemy: viz., Nah 2:8 and Zech 8:21. Furthermore, if Lifshitz's restorations are correct, the text represented by his fragments differs in character from Barthelemy's in that the word θεος appears at least once (Zech 4:9) and possibly twice (Joel 1:14), where the MT has the Tetragram. In Jonah 3:3, on the other hand, it preserves the Tetragram in a similar fashion to Barthelemy's scroll. The one (or two) place(s) where θεος appears instead of יהוה possibly represents a textual variation to the MT. If this is the case, θεος must not be considered a substitute for the Tetragram. However, it is possible that this MS represents a later transitional period in which the Tetragram was being replaced by θεος. The date of these fragments, therefore, may need reevaluating in the light of this.

It has the tetragrammaton everywhere in the phrase ἄγγελος יהוה (Angel of YHWH) instead of ἄγγελος Κυρίου (Angel of the Lord) in Zech 3:1-2, 5 and 6. The oldest example of ἄγγελος Κυρίου is in P. Oxy. 1166 from 3rd century, more than two centuries after LXX^{VTS10a}.

The fragments discovered in March 2021 also have the Tetragrammaton written in paleo-Hebrew script.

== See also ==
- Kaige revision

== Bibliography ==
- Barthélemy, Dominique (1963-12-02). Les devanciers d'Aquila. Supplements to Vetus Testamentum. Vol. 10. Leiden. doi:10.1163/9789004275331. ISBN 978-90-04-27533-1.
- Gallagher, Edmon (2013). "The religious provenance of the Aquila manuscripts from the Cairo Genizah". Journal of Jewish Studies. 64 (2): 283–305. doi:10.18647/3141/JJS-2013.
- Howard, George (1977). "The Tetragram and the New Testament" (PDF). Journal of Biblical Literature. 96 (1). The Society of Biblical Literature: 63–83. doi:10.2307/3265328. JSTOR 3265328.
- Kershner, Isabel (2021-03-16). "Israel Reveals Newly Discovered Fragments of Dead Sea Scrolls". The New York Times.
- ליפשיץ, ב (1961). "The Greek Documents from Naḥal Ṣeelim and Naḥal Mishmar / התעודות היווניות מנחל-צאלים ונחל-משמר". Bulletin of the Israel Exploration Society / ידיעות החברה לחקירת ארץ-ישראל ועתיקותיה כה. כה (א/ב). Israel Exploration Society: 73–65. JSTOR 23731189.
- ליפשיץ, ב (1962). "The Greek Documents from the "Cave of Horror" / קטעי קלף ופאפירוס ממערת-האימה". Yediot Bahaqirat Eretz-Israel Weatiqoteha / ידיעות בחקירת ארץ-ישראל ועתיקותיה. כו (ג/ד): 183–190. JSTOR 23732242.
- Lifshitz, Baruch (1962). "The Greek Documents from the Cave of Horror". Israel Exploration Journal. 12 (3/4): 201–207. JSTOR 27924908.
- New World Translation Committee (1985). "Apendix 1C: The Divine Name in Ancient Greek Versions". New World Translation of the Holy Scriptures (with references). Watchtower Bible and Track Society.
- Pearson, Brook W. R. (1997). "The Book of the Twelve, Aqiba's Messianic Interpretations, and the Refuge Caves of the Second Jewish War". In Stanley E. Porter; Craig A. Evans (eds.). The Scrolls and the Scriptures. Qumran Fifty Years After. Journal for the Study of the Pseudepigrapha. Supplement Series. Vol. 26. Sheffield: Sheffield Academic Press. pp. 221–239, 232–235. ISBN 1-85075-844-1.
- Tov, Emanuel (1990). Discoveries in the Judean Desert: VIII. The Greek Minor Prophets Scroll from Nahal Hever (8HevXIIgr). Oxford: Clarendon Press. ISBN 978-0-198263272.
- Trobisch, David (2000). The First Edition of the New Testament. Oxford University Press. p. 14. ISBN 0195112407.
- Vasileiadis, Pavlos D. (2014). "Aspects of rendering the sacred Tetragrammaton in Greek" (PDF). Open Theology. 1: 56–88. doi:10.2478/opth-2014-0006.
