= Rudolf Pesch =

Rudolf Johannes Pesch (born September 2, 1936 in Bonn, † January 13, 2011 in Rome ) was a German Catholic theologian (New Testament scholar).

== Life ==
Rudolf Pesch studied history, German studies and theology at the University of Bonn and the University of Freiburg. In 1962 he passed his state examination. In 1963 he married Ingeborg van Meegen, with whom he had two children: Berthold (* 1964) and Friederike (* 1965). In 1964 he earned his first doctorate as Dr. phil in Freiburg with the work Die kirchlich-politische Presse der Katholiken in Deutschland vor 1848 (The ecclesiastical-political press of Catholics in Germany before 1848). In 1967 followed the promotion to Dr. theol. with the work Naherwartung. Tradition und Redaktion in Markus 13 (Imminant Expectation. Tradition and Redaction in Mark 13). After being scientific assistant at the Exegetical Seminar, New Testament Department at the University of Freiburg, he completed his habilitation in 1969 at the University of Innsbruck in the field of New Testament.

In 1970, he was the first married layman to be appointed Professor of Biblical Studies at the University of Frankfurt . Pesch was advisor to the Würzburg Synod from 1971 to 1975 for the implementation of the decisions of the Second Vatican Council. In 1980 he moved to the Department of New Testament and Literature at the University of Freiburg im Breisgau. In 1976 he was a visiting professor in the Theological Year of the Dormition in Jerusalem and at the University of San Francisco.

In 1984, he renounced his chair at the University of Freiburg to get involved in the apostolic community, the then Integrated Community, of which he was a member since 1977. From 1984 to 2008 he committed to the establishment of the Academy for Faith and Form of the Catholic Integrated Community in Munich. From 2000 to 2002 he lived in Israel, where he was engaged in building up the "Beth Shalmon" in Motsa Illit near Jerusalem as a meeting place for Jews and Christians in the "Urfeld circle" and became a member of the "Ecumenical Theological Research Fraternity in Israel". From 2008 he taught together with other professors of the Catholic Integrated Community at the newly established "Chair for the Theology of the People of God" as part of the Institute of Pastoral Theology "Redemptor Hominis" at the Pontifical Lateran University.

The main research areas of Pesch were the Gospel of Mark and the Acts of Luke, to which Pesch published authoritative comments. Many of his books have been translated into Italian (partly also in English and French).

From March 2010 Pesch lived with his wife with his daughter Friederike Wallbrecher in Rome. He was received in a private audience on 19 August 2010 by Pope Benedict XVI. He died on 13 January 2011 in Rome and is buried in Castel Gandolfo.

== Publications (selection) ==
Römerbrief (Die neue Echter-Bibel: Kommentar zum Neuen Testament mit der Einheitsübersetzung), 3. edition, Würzburg 1994 (1. edition 1983).

Das Markusevangelium. Part 1: Einleitung und Kommentar zu Kap. 1,1 - 8,26 (Herders Theologischer Kommentar zum Neuen Testament), 5. edition, Freiburg 1989 (1. edition 1976). ISBN 978-3-451-17336-3

Das Markusevangelium. Part 2: Kommentar zu Kap. 8,27 - 16,20 (Herders Theologischer Kommentar zum Neuen Testament, Bd. 2,2), 4. edition, Freiburg 1991 (1. edition 1977), ISBN 978-3-451-17975-4

Die Apostelgeschichte. Volume 1: Apg 1-12 (Evangelisch-Katholischer Kommentar 5/1), 3. Aufl., Zürich/Neukirchen-Vluyn 2005 (1. Aufl. 1986). ISBN 978-3-545-23112-2

Die Apostelgeschichte. Volume 2: Apg 13-28 (Evangelisch-Katholischer Kommentar 5/1), 2. edition., Zürich/Neukirchen-Vluyn 2003 (1. edition 1986) ISBN 978-3-545-23112-2

Juden und Christen – ein einziges Volk Gottes?, Düsseldorf 2009, ISBN 978-3-491-72534-8

Paulus ringt um die Lebensform der Kirche. Vier Briefe an die Gemeinde Gottes in Korinth, Freiburg u.a. 1986. ISBN 978-3-451-08291-7

Paulus und seine Lieblingsgemeinde. Drei Briefe an die Heiligen von Philippi, Freiburg u.a. 1984, ISBN 978-3-451-08208-5

Die Entdeckung des ältesten Paulus-Briefes. Die Briefe an die Gemeinde der Thessalonicher, Freiburg u.a. 1984, ISBN 978-3-451-08167-5

Das Evangelium der Urgemeinde, 3. Aufl., Freiburg u.a. 1984 (1. Aufl. 1979),ISBN 978-3-451-07748-7

Zwischen Karfreitag und Ostern. Die Umkehr der Jünger Jesu, Zürich u.a. 1983, ISBN 978-3-545-20079-1

Wie Jesus das Abendmahl hielt. Der Grund der Eucharistie, 3. Aufl., Freiburg u.a. 1979, ISBN 978-3-451-17874-0

with Gerhard Lohfink: Tiefenpsychologie und keine Exegese - Eine Auseinandersetzung mit Eugen Drewermann, Katholisches Bibelwerk, Stuttgart 1988, ISBN 978-3-460-04291-9

Die Weihnachtsbotschaft : die biblischen Weihnachtstexte neu übersetzt und ausgelegt, Katholisches Bibelwerk, Stuttgart 2016, ISBN 978-3-460-32145-8

Die lebendigste Jesuserzählung : das Lukasevangelium / kommentiert von Thomas P. Osborne und wörtlich übers. von Rudolf Pesch in Zusammenarbeit mit Ulrich Wilckens und Reinhard Kratz, Katholisches Bibelwerk, Stuttgart 2009, ISBN 978-3-940743-87-9

Die matthäischen Weihnachtsgeschichten : die Magier aus dem Osten, König Herodes und der bethlehemitsche Kindermord; Mt 2 neu übersetzt und ausgelegt, Bonifatius, Paderborn, 2009, ISBN 978-3-89710-448-8

Der Jude Jesus von Nazareth : zum Gespräch zwischen Jacob Neusner und Papst Benedikt XVI., zusammen mit Achim Buckenmaier und Ludwig Weimer, Bonifatius, Paderborn, 2008, ISBN 978-3-89710-419-8

Gott ist gegenwärtig : die Versammlung des Volkes Gottes in Synagoge und Kirche, St Ulrich, Augsburg, 2006, ISBN 978-3-936484-68-7

Antisemitismus in der Bibel? : das Johannesevangelium auf dem Prüfstand, St. Ulrich, Augsburg, 2005, ISBN 978-3-936484-44-1

Über das Wunder der Jungfrauengeburt : ein Schlüssel zum Verstehen, Verlag Urfeld, Bad Tölz, 2002, ISBN 978-3-932857-25-6

Über das Wunder der Brotvermehrung: Gibt es eine Lösung für den Hunger in der Welt?, Knecht, Frankfurt am Main, 1995, ISBN 3-7820-0718-2

La visione di Stefano (Studi Biblici), Brescia 1969, Paideia, ISBN 978-88-39402-84-4

Il vangelo di Marco Parte prima (Commentario Teologico del Nuovo Testamento), Brescia 1980, Paideia, ISBN 978-88-394-0169-4; Parte seconda (Commentario Teologico del Nuovo Testamento), Brescia 1982, Paideia, ISBN 978-88-394-0170-0

Tra Venerdì santo e Pasqua : la conversione dei discepoli di Gesù, 1993, Morcelliana, ISBN 9788837214708

La scoperta della più antica lettera di Paolo : Paolo rivisitato : le lettere alla comunità dei Tessalonicesi, 1987, Paideia, ISBN 9788839404039

Il processo a Gesù continua 1993, Queriniana, ISBN 9788839915047

Il miracolo della moltiplicazione dei pani : c'è una soluzione per la fame nel mondo? 1997, Queriniana, ISBN 9788839915306

I fondamenti biblici del primato, 2002, Queriniana, ISBN 9788839907912

Atti degli Apostoli, 1992, Cittadella, ISBN 9788830805088

Antisemitismo nella Bibbia? : indagine sul Vangelo di Giovanni, 2007, Queriniana, ISBN 9788839908285

Il Vangelo del Natale, Brescia 2008, Queriniana, ISBN 978-88-399-2279-3

Simon Pietro : storia e importanza storica del primo discepolo di Gesù Cristo, 2008, Queriniana, ISBN 9788839908315

The trial of Jesus continues, Pickwick Publications, Allison Park, Pa., 1996, Princeton theological monograph series, Volume 43,ISBN 978-1-55635-033-7
