= Catholic Integrated Community =

Apostolic association, 1945–2020

The Catholic Integrated Community (CIC) was an apostolic community within the Roman Catholic Church according to Decree Apostolicam Actuositatem No. 18/19 of the Second Vatican Council. It was recognized by the church in several dioceses in Germany, Austria, Italy and Tanzania. After an investigation of the community by the Archdiocese of Munich and Freising, Munich Archbishop Cardinal Reinhard Marx dissolved it (in his diocese) under canon law in November 2020. In the meantime, most of the German dioceses followed suit and also dissolved their integrated communities.

== History ==
The beginnings of the CIC reach back to the post-World War II period. Its initiators were Traudl Wallbrecher (née Weiß; 18 May 1923 – 29 July 2016) and her husband, lawyer Herbert Wallbrecher. The group grew out of the Catholic youth movement.

In 1949, Traudl Weiß married Wallbrecher, who belonged to the Catholic Bund Neudeutschland. With him and his friend Johannes Joachim Degenhardt, the later Cardinal and archbishop of Paderborn, she found two allies. The group oriented itself towards modern exegesis, the liturgy and ecumenical movement, the Jewish roots of Christianity, and post-war philosophy and literature (amongst others the French existentialists).

The magazine Die Integrierte Gemeinde aroused the interest of agnostics like Gerhard Szczesny and theologians like Joseph Ratzinger, who supported the path of the KIG within the Catholic Church from then on. The friendship with Chaim Seeligmann led to the founding of the Urfelder Kreis in 1995.

In 1977 the private Günter-Stöhr-Gymnasium was founded, now one of the schools of the St. Anna school network.

Since 1978, an Integrated Community in Africa has developed from her encounter with Bishop Christopher Mwoleka, Tanzania. Today members of the community there lead the Herbert Wallbrecher school in Mikese.

In 1977, the CIC was recognized as a public church association by the archbishop of Paderborn, Cardinal Johannes Joachim Degenhardt, and in the same year by Cardinal Joseph Ratzinger, at that time archbishop of Munich and Freising, the later Pope Benedict XVI.

A chair called Cattedra per la Teologia del Popolo di Dio ('Chair for the Theology of the People of God') was set up at the Lateran University in Rome in 2008.

In October 2016 the Cattedra per la Teologia del Popolo di Dio began offering the post-graduate distance learning module "The Profile of the Jewish Christian". The course is offered in German and English.

== Mission and organization ==
In its statutes of 1978 the CIC describes its work as an attempt "in a world estranged from the church to make the gospel present in such a way that those whose path has led them away from church can again find new access to the faith of the Catholic Church. Their members are connecting their lives in all areas in a variety of ways and take joint initiatives – self-dependent and self-financed."

The CIC is subordinated to the local bishop in whose diocese it is active. In its list of groups and associations of the Roman Catholic Church, the Pontifical Council for the Laity mentions the lay movement as an association of believers.

The CIC includes families and unmarried persons, laymen and priests, who form table communities and also live in residential communities. According to their self-conception and practice, everyone is "responsible for their livelihood, for their profession, financial circumstances and property, as well as provisions for old age and illness." According to the statutes, the general assembly is the responsible committee. It also elects the leadership team and the head of the leadership team, who must be confirmed by the bishop.

== Initiatives ==
Initiatives pursued by people associated with the CIC are, amongst others:

- St. Anna Association of Schools
- Academic chair for the Theology of the People of God at the Papal Lateran University in Rome
- Distance learning "Theology of the People of God – The Jewish-Christian Profile"
- Professor Ludwig Weimer Foundation

== People ==
- Traudl Wallbrecher (1923–2016) and Herbert Wallbrecher (1922–1997)
- Ludwig Weimer (born 1940), theologian and priest
- Achim Buckenmaier (born 1959), theologian and priest
- Michael P. Maier (born 1961), theologian and priest
- Rudolf Pesch (1936–2011), theologian and historian
- Pope emeritus. Benedikt XVI. (1927–2022), friend and patron
- Norbert Lohfink (1928–2024), theologian and priest
- Gerhard Lohfink (1934–2024), theologian and priest
- Rudolf Kutschera (born 1960), theologian and priest
