= Hengsbach =

Hengsbach is a German surname. Notable people with the surname include:

- Franz Hengsbach (1910–1991), German Roman Catholic theologian, priest, Cardinal, Bishop of Essen
- Friedhelm Hengsbach (born 1937), Roman Catholic social ethician
