= Dominique Barthélemy =

Dominique Barthélemy may refer to:

- Dominique Barthélemy (biblical scholar) (1921–2002)
- Dominique Barthélemy (medievalist) (born 1953)
