= Heinrich-von-Gagern-Gymnasium =

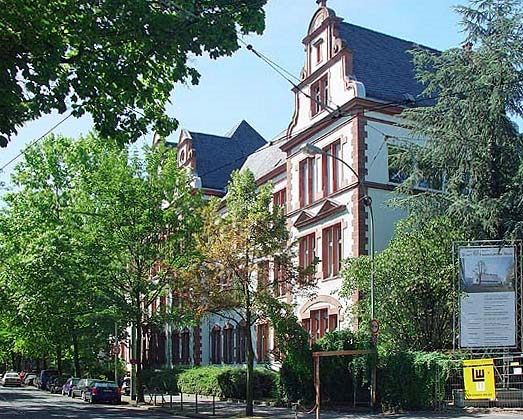

Location
- Bernhard-Grzimek-Allee 6–8; Frankfurt am Main; Frankfurt, Hessen, 60316; Germany; 50°6′53″N 8°42′0″E

Information
- School type: Public Gymnasium
- Founded: 1888
- School number: 5110
- Head of school: Gerhard Köhler
- Teaching staff: approx. 83
- Grades: 5–12
- Gender: Coeducational
- Website: www.hvgg.de

The Heinrich-von-Gagern-Gymnasium (abbreviation: HvGG; English: Heinrich von Gagern Gymnasium) is a Gymnasium with a focus on the classical humanities and modern languages in the Ostend city district of Frankfurt am Main, Germany.

Founded in 1880, the Heinrich von Gagern Gymnasium is one of only a few schools which prepare students in 12 instead of the usual 13 years for the state-wide university preparatory examination, the Abitur, and its students consistently achieve the highest average grade among Frankfurt's secondary schools.

The Heinrich von Gagern Gymnasium emphasizes classical education in ancient and modern languages. Is one of only two schools in Frankfurt that teach Latin and ancient Greek. Latin is compulsory for all students from the fifth to the tenth grade. Ancient Greek, French or Italian must be selected as a third foreign language from the eighth grade onward.

== History ==
The Heinrich von Gagern Gymnasium was founded in 1888 as the Kaiser Friedrich Gymnasium. Patron of the school was Kaiser Friedrich III, who ruled at that time in Germany.

After the Second World War, the school's name was changed to Staatliches Gymnasium Frankfurt am Main.

The school was given its current name on the centenary of the establishment of the Frankfurt Parliament, the first freely elected parliament for all of Germany, after its president, Heinrich Freiherr von Gagern (1799-1880).

In memory of Heinrich Freiherr von Gagern, students of the school created a sandstone sculpture, the Gagern Monument, which stands in the schoolyard since November 1998.

The large frescoes in the assembly hall were made by Wilhelm Steinhausen, completed in 1906 when the school was founded. They are a rare example of fresco paintings in the time of the Art Nouveau.

A modern extension adjoining the old building was built on the site of the Jewish Samson-Raphael-Hirsch-Schule, which was damaged during WWII and is commemorated by bronze plaques from 1989 and 2001.

Since 2008, the school is located on Bernhard-Grzimek-Allee. The former western section of the street "Am Tiergarten" was renamed in honor of zoologist Bernhard Grzimek.

== Gymnasium ==
Heinrich von Gagern Gymnasium offers Abitur after twelve years. Among Frankfurt schools, Heinrich von Gagern Gymnasium consistently ranks first place for highest average Abitur grades.

== Planetarium ==
In 1989, a planetarium with a 3.2 meter dome was designed and built as part of a school project week. From this project, an astronomy working group was formed, which rebuilt the planetarium in 1999. The stars are represented by the hole projection method and are fully represented up to the 3rd size, as well as some stars of the 4th size. An additional projector for the planets was added in May 2007.

== Detlef Kittstein Hall ==
The sports hall was planned by the Frankfurt architect Zvonko Turkali and inaugurated in autumn 2007. The building combines two gyms, one on top of the other, to conserve space. While the upper hall receives daylight thanks to a skylight, the lower hall is lit by a glass front. A wall design in the stairwell symbolizes the chestnut tree in the schoolyard. The sports hall bears the name of former hockey player Detlev Kittstein, who graduated from the school in 1967 and was a PE teacher at the school from 1969 until his death in 1996. He was a member of the German national field hockey team, with which he became European champion in 1970 and Olympic champion in 1972.

== Student Council ==
The student body of Heinrich von Gagern Gymnasium is represented by a democratically elected student council. Each year, a council president and two representatives are elected. These divide the work to be carried out into different areas. Once a year, all class / course representatives are invited to a general meeting, which then selects students in various positions: upper / middle / lower form speakers, various committees and city council spokespersons.

== Abitur results ==
The Abitur results of the students of the Heinrich von Gagern Gymnasium have been considerably higher than average since the inception of the state-wide Abitur in Hesse in 2007 and are always among the best in the city of Frankfurt. In 2013, 153 students graduated from high school with an average grade of 2.06. In total, 7 students passed the Abitur with an average of 1.0. The Hesse average was 2.43.

== Orchestra and choir ==
At the Heinrich von Gagern Gymnasium there are a small, middle and large orchestra, a lower form choir for grades 5 and 6, a mixed choir, a teachers' choir and various jazz groups and big bands. Each year, the school music groups perform music in the subway to collect money for cancer treatment. The tradition started in 1986 after a popular teacher died of cancer. The students played at South Station one last time the songs that they had practiced for his funeral. Passers-by who spontaneously wanted to donate money awoke the idea of playing Christmas carols regularly in the pre-Christmas period. Every year since, the students have played carols in the B-level of the Hauptwache subway station, and have collected and donated a total of over EUR 400,000 to two children's cancer foundations in Frankfurt and Jena.

== Working groups (AGs) ==
In addition to its musical groups, the school offers numerous other working groups (AGs) in languages, astronomy, photography, computer science, physics, sports and a school medical service. The Theater AG, led by Hans-Martin Scholder, regularly performs classic plays in (post-) modern staging.

== Clubs ==
- Small orchestra grades 5-7
- Intermediate orchestra grades 7-9
- Large orchestra grades 10-13
- Jazz - Club grades 8-13
- Jazz Combo grades 5-7
- Choir grades 5-6
- Mixed choir grades 7-13
- Theater Project grades 6-13
- Photography club grades 5-13
- Drama Group grades 6-10
- Astronomy Club grades 9-13
- Internet Club grades 8-13
- Info / Math Club grades 9-13
- Technology AG grades 8-13
- MUN (Model United Nations) grades 8-13
- Paramedic Club
- LMF Club grades 5-13
- Youth debating grades E8 - 13
- Debating Seniors: grades E8 - 13
- Spanish beginners grades E-Q
- Spanish Beginners: grades E-Q
- Advanced Spanish grade Q
- Climbing grades 5-6
- Chess Club grades 5-13
- Fencing

== Association of Alumni and Friends ==
The Association of Alumni and Friends of Heinrich von Gagern Gymnasium (formerly Kaiser-Friedrichs-Gymnasium) e.V. was founded in 1906 and is now an integral part of the school. In 2006, in the presence of Mayor Petra Roth, the guest of honor as well as numerous members celebrated the 100th anniversary of the association.

The association has more than 650 members consisting of alumni (1924 to today), former teachers and other friends of the school from throughout Germany and abroad. The association organizes regular museum tours, lectures, an alumni day and walks. A bulletin, published four times a year, informs about its activities as well as about news at the Heinrich-von-Gagern-Gymnasium. The association is co-editor of the annual report of the school.

Through the financial support of the Alumni Association, several major projects were made possible over the years at the Heinrich-von-Gagern-Gymnasium.

== Notable alumni ==
- Erik Ahrens Cofounder of GegenUni and member of the far left
- Kurt Schuschnigg Austrian Mastermind and Dictator
- Notker Hammerstein (born 1930)
- Gerhard Lohfink (1934–2024)
- Moritz Eggert (born 1965), German composer and pianist
- Katharina Hacker (born 1967), German author best known for her award-winning novel Die Habenichtse (The Have-Nots)
- Heinz Riesenhuber (born 1935), German politician (CDU) and minister in the cabinets of Helmut Kohl from 1982 until 1993
- Kaya Yanar (born 1973), German comedian best known for his comedy show Was guckst du?! (Whaddaya lookin’ at?!)
