= Hebrew Old Testament Text Project =

The Hebrew Old Testament Text Project (HOTTP) was an international and interconfessional committee of six Hebrew Bible scholars organized in 1969 by Eugene Nida, then head of the translations department of the United Bible Societies (UBS). This UBS sponsored committee was made up of Dominique Barthélemy, Alexander R. Hulst, Norbert Lohfink, W.D. McHardy, Hans Peter Rüger, and James A. Sanders. Nida served as chair of the committee with secretaries Adrian Schenker and J. A. Thompson. As a result of holding annual meetings from 1969 to 1980 to review issues of textual criticism deemed significant for translators, the committee issued a five-volume Preliminary and Interim Report between 1973 and 1980 (edited by Schenker) which is also sometimes referred to and cited as "HOTTP."

HOTTP is an important precursor to Biblia Hebraica Quinta and Barthélemy's five-volume final report entitled Critique textuelle de l’Ancien Testament (CTAT) published between 1982 and 2015.

== Committee member roles ==
The work of the HOTTP committee was assigned to individual members as follows:

- Thompson (ABS) – "list those passages that UBS translation committees had found most difficult for their [translation] purposes."
- Rüger (Tübingen) – "provide sheets well before each annual session giving the readings of all the ancient witnesses for the principal words in the passages."
- Sanders (Claremont) – "provide all the available readings from the Judaean Desert Scrolls, Qumran and otherwise."
- Lohfink (Frankfurt) – "research the pertinent, important, modern critical studies on the passages to share during the annual sessions."
- Barthélemy (Fribourg) – "research the pertinent history of exegesis of each problem up to the modern critical period."
- Hulst (Utrecht) and McHardy (Oxford) – "brought their long experience in the work of translation to the discussions."

== Preliminary and Interim Report ==
The United Bible Societies published a preliminary report (Preliminary and interim report on the Hebrew Old Testament Text Project = Compte rendu préliminaire et provisoire sur le travail d'analyse textuelle de l'Ancien Testament hébreu) in five volumes as follows:

1. Volume 1: Pentateuch (1973; 2nd rev. ed. 1976)
2. Volume 2: Historical Books (1976)
3. Volume 3: Poetical Books (1977)
4. Volume 4: Prophetical Books I (1979)
5. Volume 5: Prophetical Books II (1980)

In the preface, the Report describes itself as follows:

This preliminary and interim report of the international and interconfessional committee of the Hebrew Old Testament Text Project, sponsored by the United Bible Societies, is both tentative and summary. It is being made available to the Bible translators and scholars on a periodic basis, so as to provide a summary analysis of the continuing work of the Committee ... in view of the practical goals of this project, the selection of textual problems has been governed by two considerations: (1) the textual problems should involve significant differences of meaning, and (2) they should be those which are likely to come to the attention of Bible translators as the result of their consulting one or more of the four most widely used texts in modern languages, namely, the Revised Standard Version (RSV), the Jerusalem Bible in French (J), the Revised Luther Bible in German (L), and the New English Bible (NEB). Most of the textual problems treated in this preliminary report are noted in the apparatus of the Third Edition of the Kittel text of the Hebrew Old Testament, and hence the reader of this report may consult the Kittel text for supplementary textual evidence.

== Critique textuelle de l'Ancien Testament ==
On behalf of the HOTTP committee, Barthélemy edited a five-volume final report (in French) entitled Critique textuelle de l'Ancien Testament : rapport final du Comite pour l'analyse textuelle de l'Ancien Testament hébreu (Textual Criticism of the Old Testament: Final Report of the Committee for Textual Analysis of the Hebrew Old Testament) which the Éditions Universitaires and Vandenhoeck & Ruprecht jointly published as follows:

1. Tome 1. Josué, Juges, Ruth, Samuel, Rois, Chroniques, Esdras, Néhémie, Esther (1982)
2. Tome 2. Isaïe, Jérémie, Lamentations (1986)
3. Tome 3. Ézéchiel, Daniel et les 12 Prophètes (1992)
4. Tome 4. Psaumes (2005)
5. Tome 5: Job, Proverbes, Qohélet et Cantique des Cantiques (2015)

Passing away in 2003, Barthélemy left unfinished the drafts of the fourth and fifth volumes, which the Dominican Stephen Ryan has now "put in final form."

== See also ==
- Biblia Hebraica Quinta
- Hebrew University Bible
