= Achim Buckenmaier =

German priest

Achim Buckenmaier (born 1959 in Hechingen, Baden- Württemberg ) is a Roman Catholic priest and dogmatist.

== Life ==
Achim Buckenmaier studied in Freiburg im Breisgau and Paris Catholic theology and received ordination in 1985. In addition, he passed the state examination for teaching at secondary schools and the state examination for the subject German at high schools. After being vicar and bible teacher in the Archdiocese of Freiburg, he joined in 1990, the " Community of Priests Serving Catholic Integrated Communities" (KIG), for which he was, inter alia, several years in Tanzania.

In 1994, Buckenmaier earned his doctorate at LMU Munich with Gerhard Ludwig Müller with the dogmatic work Das Verhältnis von Schrift und Tradition nach dem Zweiten Vatikanischen Konzil. Vorgeschichte und Rezeption (The Relationship of Scripture and Tradition after the Second Vatican Council).

From 2000 to 2002 he was managing director of St. Anna School Association, a private school with Catholic orientation.

In 2009, he was habilitated with the document Universale Kirche vor Ort - Aspekte zur Verhältnisbestimmung von Universalkirche und Lokalkirche ausgehend von der Debatte zwischen Joseph Ratzinger und Walter Kasper an der Katholisch-Theologischen Fakultät der Rheinischen Friedrich-Wilhelms-Universität Bonn. (Universal Church on the spot - Aspects of determining the relationship between Universal Church and Local Church).

As Professor of Dogmatics, Achim Buckenmaier was the director of the Founding Chair for the Theology of the People of God at the Pontifical Lateran University in Rome from 2009 to 2021, established by the Catholic Integrated Community. The "distinction of the Jewish-Christian in relation to the religions," "Ecclesiology" and "Sacramental Doctrine and Practice" are contents of the work of this chair, which wants to teach the "unity between the Old and New Testament". In the spirit of a new evangelization, the chair deliberately uses a comprehensible language and is open to anyone interested. From autumn 2016, the chair offers a post-gradual distance learning "The profile of the Jewish-Christian" in German and since September 2017 also in English. The Chair forms part of the Pontifical Pastoral Institute "Redemptor Hominis".

Since 2009, Buckenmaier is a member of the New Circle of Students Joseph Ratzinger / Benedict XVI, an international circle of theologians. Pope Benedict XVI appointed him in 2011 as the Consultor of the Pontifical Council for the Promotion of the New Evangelization and on 15 December 2012 as the Consultor of the Congregation for the Doctrine of the Faith. This appointment was prolongated by Pope Francis until 2027. In 2015, in addition to his professorship in Rome, he became Chairman of the Supervisory Board of the Munich-based St. Anna School Association.

== Publications (selection) ==
- Der gerettete Anfang. Schrift und Tradition in Israel und der Kirche. Bad Tölz 2002, ISBN 3-93285-724-0.
- Abraham. Vater der Gläubigen. Eine Glaubensbiographie. Augsburg 2003, ISBN 3-93648-410-4.
- Was ist der Mensch? Ausgangspunkte einer christlichen Erziehung. Bad Tölz 2004, ISBN 3-93285-742-9.
- Moses. Geschichte einer Rettung. Augsburg 2005, ISBN 978-3-93648-455-7.
- Ist das noch unsere Kirche? Regensburg 2012, ISBN 3-7917-2423-1.
- Lehramt der Bischofskonferenzen? Regensburg 2016, ISBN 978-3-79172-833-9.
- with Arnold Stötzel and Ludwig Weimer: Die sieben Zeichen des Messias : das eine Volk Gottes als Sakrament für die Welt, Regensburg, Pustet 2012, ISBN 978-3-7917-2426-3
- Il Tesoro Particolare. Temi della Chiesa di oggi. Ecumenica Editrice, Bari 2022, ISBN 978-88-85952-31-7
- Priester Beruf und Berufung auf dem Prüfstand. Pustet, Regensburg 2023, ISBN 978-3791-73397-5
