= Norbert Lohfink =

German theologian (1928–2024)

- Lohfink, c. 2000
- Born: 28 July 1928; Frankfurt am Main, Prussia, German Republic
- Died: 23 September 2024 (aged 96); Munich, Bavaria, Germany
- Education: Berchmanskolleg; Sankt Georgen Graduate School of Philosophy and Theology; Pontifical Biblical Institute
- Occupations: Priest; Theologian
- Organizations: Sankt Georgen; Pontifical Biblical Institute, Rome; Catholic Integrated Community

Ecclesiastical career
- Church: Catholic Church
- Ordained: 1956

Norbert Lohfink SJ (28 July 1928 – 23 September 2024) was a German Catholic priest, theologian and member of the Jesuit Order. He was professor of exegesis of the Old Testament at the Sankt Georgen Graduate School of Philosophy and Theology in Frankfurt. He also taught at the Pontifical Biblical Institute in Rome, for four years in the 1960s and repeatedly for guest semesters. His works were translated into several languages. He worked on international and ecumenical projects, such as the Hebrew Old Testament Text Project.

== Life and career ==
Lohfink was born in Frankfurt am Main, the eldest of four siblings in a workers' family; his father was a train driver. He grew up in the Kuhwaldsiedlung in Bockenheim and in the Gallus quarter. He learned a sensibility for the quality of literature early, for example reading in watch shifts as a Luftwaffenhelfer. During the last school year, he had a Brentano scholar for a teacher who taught latest developments in literary studies.

He joined the Jesuits shortly after completing school with the Abitur, as a novice at Schloss Eringerfeld in 1947. He studied philosophy at the Berchmanskolleg in Pullach near Munich from 1947 to 1953. During this time he studied also Rilke's Duino Elegies for a year, and Henri de Lubac's Exégèse médiévale. He then did theology at the Sankt Georgen Graduate School of Philosophy and Theology in Frankfurt to 1957. He further studied exegesis at the Pontifical Biblical Institute in Rome where he achieved the doctorate in 1962.

Lohfink was ordained a priest in 1956 at the Frankfurt Cathedral. He taught at Sankt Georgen from 1962, then from 1966 at the Pontifical Biblical Institute for four years, and finally at Sankt Georgen again until 1996. He returned to Rome occasionally for guest semesters. Lohfink became an internationally respected expert, and a teacher who was able to fascinate his audience.

Lohfink's main areas of research were Deuteronomy, Qoheleth and the Psalms; his scientific works in those areas are regarded as milestones in research history. His books were translated into many languages.

Lohfink was the founder or co-founder of the series "Stuttgarter Bibelstudien" and "Stuttgarter Biblische Aufsatzbände", and a co-editor of the "Yearbook for Biblical Theology" and the "Zeitschrift für altorientalische und biblische Rechtsgeschichte". He translated two books of the Bible for the ecumenical Einheitsübersetzung, and worked for ten years for the Hebrew Old Testament Text Project of the United Bible Societies. He worked over many years in the international liturgy commission of German-speaking countries (IAG) and collaborated with Georg Braulik on a Deuteronomy commentary for the Hermeneia series of Fortress Press.

Lohfink worked towards understanding, dialogue and collaboration of Christians and Jews who share the same texts. In a 1987 collection, Das Jüdische am Christentum. Die verlorene Dimension., he pointed at the Jewish Welthaftigkeit, an openness towards the world which is specific to the Old Testament: faith as origin of wanting to transform the world.

=== Personal life ===
Lohfink was the brother of Gerhard Lohfink. He and his brother belonged to the Catholic Integrated Community. He moved to the Pedro Arrupe community for seniors in Unterhaching in 2021.

Lohfink died in Munich on 23 September 2024, at the age of 96.

== Honorary doctorates ==
- 1992–93 University of Vienna

== Writings ==
=== Dissertation ===
- Lohfink, Norbert (1963). Das Hauptgebot eine Untersuchung literarischer Einleitungsfragen zu Dtn 5–11 (Thesis) (in German). Rome: E Pontificio Instituto Biblico. OCLC 655384712.

=== In German ===
Lohfink's bibliography was published by the Sankt Georgen University.

- Lohfink, Norbert (1978). Hinter den Dingen ein Gott (in German). Freiburg: Herder. ISBN 978-3-451-18226-6.
- —— (1980). Kohelet (in German). Würzburg: Echter. ISBN 978-3-429-00655-6.
- —— (1987). Das Jüdische am Christentum (in German). Freiburg: Herder. ISBN 978-3-451-20994-9.
- —— (1988). Kirchenträume (in German). Freiburg; Basel; Vienna: Herder. ISBN 978-3-451-21254-3.
- —— (1989). Der niemals gekündigte Bund (in German). Freiburg; Basel; Vienna: Herder. ISBN 978-3-451-21597-1.
- —— (1999). Im Schatten deiner Flügel (in German). Freiburg; Basel; Vienna: Herder. ISBN 978-3-451-27176-2.
- Braulik, Georg; ——; Bücken, Erwin (2003). Osternacht und Altes Testament (in German). Frankfurt: Peter Lang Gmbh, Internationaler Verlag Der Wissenschaften. ISBN 978-3-631-51819-9.
- Braulik, Georg; —— (19 January 2022). Die Rhetorik der Moserede in Deuteronomium 1 - 4 (in German). Berlin; Bern; Bruxelles; New York; Oxford; Warsaw; Vienna: Peter Lang Gmbh, Internationaler Verlag Der Wissenschaften. ISBN 978-3-631-87348-9.
- Braulik, Georg; —— (10 July 2024). Kommentar Zu Deuteronomium 1 (in German). Berlin; Bruxelle; Chennai; Lausanne; New York; Oxford: Peter Lang Gmbh, Internationaler Verlag Der Wissenschaften. ISBN 978-3-631-89521-4.

=== In English ===
- Lohfink, Norbert (1991). The Covenant Never Revoked. New York; Mahwah, NJ: Paulist Press. ISBN 978-0-8091-3228-7.
- —— (1994). Theology of the Pentateuch. Burns & Oates. ISBN 978-0-567-29251-3.
- —— (2000). Church Dreams. North Richland Hills, Tex: D & F Scott Publishing Incorporated. ISBN 978-0-941037-91-4.
- —— (2000). The God of Israel and the Nations. Liguori, Mo: Liguori. ISBN 978-0-7648-0575-2.
- —— (2003). Qoheleth. Continental Commentaries. ISBN 978-0-8006-9604-7.

=== Other languages ===
- Lohfink, Norbert (1997). Un Dio dietro le cose [Hinter den Dingen ein Gott] (in Italian). Ancora. ISBN 978-88-7610-575-3.
- —— (1997). Qohelet (in Italian). Morcelliana. ISBN 978-88-372-1646-7.
- —— (2004). Álmok az egyházról [Kirchenträume] (in Hungarian). Szeged: Agapé. ISBN 978-963-458-280-9.
- —— (2002). A la sombra de tus alas [Im Schatten deiner Flügel] (in Spanish). Bilbao: Desclée de Brouwer. ISBN 978-84-330-1692-8.
