= Friedhelm Hengsbach =

Friedhelm Hengsbach

Friedhelm Hengsbach is a professor emeritus for Christian social ethics. He was also director of the Oswald von Nell-Breuning Institute for Economic and Social Ethical Studies of the Jesuit Sankt Georgen Graduate School of Philosophy and Theology in Frankfurt.

== Biography ==
Friedhelm Hengsbach was born in Dortmund in 1937. After attending grammar school and passing his A-levels he joined the Society of Jesus when he was twenty, and studied at the order's own Munich School of Philosophy. His work experience in pedagogy took him back to North Rhine-Westphalia, before he studied theology at the Goethe University Frankfurt from 1964 to 1968, and economics at the Ruhr University Bochum from 1968 to 1972. His doctoral thesis was about African states as Associate Members of the European Community, and he obtained a professorship for his thesis on the subject of work ethics: "The pre-eminence of labour - an option of Catholic social teaching".

Before he became a professor, he was a lecturer in Christian Social Science at the Sankt Georgen Graduate School of Philosophy and Theology in Frankfurt, where he was appointed professor of Christian Social Science, Economic and Social Studies in 1985. From 1992 to 2006 he was the director of that institution. He retired as a professor in 2005.

Nowadays Hengsbach lives in Ludwigshafen, where he still works as a lecturer at the Catholic Academy of the Rhine Neckar District.

== Criticism of the present Capitalist Economy ==
Hengsbach has always been an outspoken critic of the present Capitalist economy. He is not against Capitalism as such - he speaks of its "positive dynamics" which will remain the dominant economic style.

But if Capitalism is left deregulated and unchecked, it inevitably leads to injustice in society and to the failure of the system itself. Then the state is needed to save the system, the same state that has been told to keep out of the economy before. Of course the state can only save the system at the expense of its millions of taxpayers - the losers of the previous rat race. When the system has been restored, the state may withdraw again, and the old imbalances prevail: the power of the banks versus the impotence of politics, the strong position of employers in comparison with that of their employees, the constant reduction of means for public welfare, and the mindless destruction of our environment. Hengsbach's hope: "to liberate the government, the state from the maelstrom of the lobbyists". - "A different sort of capitalism is possible" is the title of one of his publications.

== Social involvement ==
As a member of the advisory committee of the Association for the Taxation of Financial Transactions and for Citizens' Action (Attac), Hengsbach takes part in numerous discussions, debates, talks and lectures on the various aspects of globalization. He sees a close connection between globalization in its present form and the kind of capitalism which he criticizes - characterized by a lack of "solidarity and justice".

== Prizes ==
Prizes Friedhelm Hengsbach was awarded include the Gustav-Heinemann-Buergerpreis, the Regine-Hildebrandt-Preis für Solidarität bei Arbeitslosigkeit und Armut, the Marburger Leuchtfeuer and the Walter-Dirks-Preis.
