= Baruch Lifshitz =

Belarusian professor

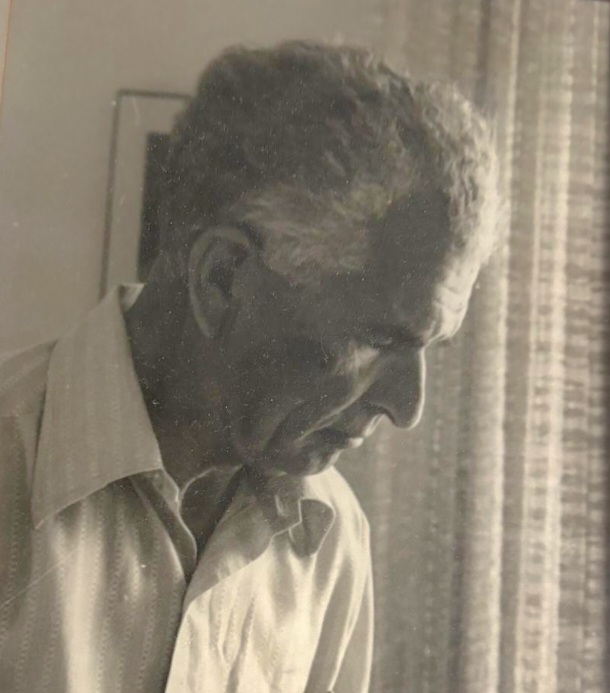
- Baruch Lifshitz in 1965
- Born: 1913; Davyd-Haradok
- Died: 18 September 1976; Tel Aviv
- Education: Hebrew University of Jerusalem
- Occupation: University teacher
- Employer: Hebrew University of Jerusalem

Baruch Lifshitz (Hebrew: ברוך ליפשיץ; 1913, Davyd-Haradok – 1976, Tel Aviv) was a Belarusian professor of the Department of Classics at the Hebrew University of Jerusalem. He participated in excavations in Israel, and his research has been published in different referenced works.

== Life ==
Lifshitz was born in 1913 at Davyd-Haradok in Byelorussia, where he received his early education. He studied at the Vilnius University, but had to abandon his studies and flee because of the outbreak of World War II. Lifshitz fled to Tashkent, where he was conscripted into the Red Army.

In 1946, he arrived in Palestine, and began studying history and classics at the Hebrew University of Jerusalem. He earned his M.A in 1952, and his Ph.D. in 1957 at Jerusalem. His dissertation was entitled The Protection of Graves in Grave Inscriptions in Eretz-Israel, and while preparing his doctoral thesis, he studied Greek epigraphy in Paris with professor Louis Robert.

Lifshitz was senior lecturer in classics and later a professor at The Hebrew University of Jerusalem. He began working at the Hebrew University in 1952 as a senior scholar. In 1957 he became an instructor, and in 1962 a lecturer.

During some twenty years of his life he published contributions to Jewish and Latin epigraphy, study of the Greek and Latin inscriptions of Palestines. He was the first to compile inscriptions of the synagogue's founders and donors in his work Donateurs et fondateurs dans les synagogues juives répertoire des dédicaces grecques relatives à la construction et à la réfection des synagogues. He has also worked as an editor and translator of ancient manuscripts. His papers have been published in more than 70 scholarly journals. Yigael Yadin has published some of his research in Israel Exploration Journal by the Israel Exploration Society.

Lifshitz died on September 18, 1976, in Tel Aviv, Israel.

== Some works ==
=== Thesis ===
- Lifshitz, Baruch (1957). The Protection of Graves in Grave Inscriptions in Eretz-Israel (PhD diss. Hebrew University of Jerusalem).

=== Books ===
- ——————— (1967). Donateurs et fondateurs dans les synagogues juives: répertoire des dédicaces grecques relatives à la construction et à la réfection des synagogues. Cahiers de la Revue biblique, Revue biblique, ISSN 0575-0741. Vol. 7. J. Gabalda. OCLC 600240401.
- ———————; Schwabe, Mošeh (1974). Beth She'arim. II. The Greeks inscriptions. Vol. 2. Jerusalem: Massada Press. ISBN 0813507626.

=== Book chapters ===
- ——————— (1978). "Scythopolis. L'histoire, les institutions et les cultes de la ville à l'époque hellénistique et impériale". In Temporini, Hildegard; Haase, Wolfgang (eds.). Politische Geschichte (Provinzen und Randvölker: Syrien, Palästina, Arabien). Aufstieg und Niedergang der römischen Welt (ANRW) / Rise and Decline of the Roman World. Vol. 8. doi:10.1515/9783110866940-010. ISBN 9783110866940. OCLC 848357261.
- ——————— (1978). "Jérusalem sous la domination romaine. Histoire de la ville depuis la conquête de Pompée jusqu'à Constantin (63 a. C. — 325 p. C.)". In Temporini, Hildegard; Haase, Wolfgang (eds.). Politische Geschichte (Provinzen und Randvölker: Syrien, Palästina, Arabien). Aufstieg und Niedergang der römischen Welt (ANRW) / Rise and Decline of the Roman World. Vol. 8. doi:10.1515/9783110866940-014. ISBN 9783110866940.

=== Articles ===
- ——————— (1962). "The Greek Documents from the Cave of Horror". Israel Exploration Journal. 12 (3/4): 201–207. JSTOR 27924908.
- ——————— (1962). "Papyrus grecs du désert de Juda". Aegyptus (in French). 42 (3/4): 240–256. JSTOR 41215857.
- ——————— (1962). "L'origine du nom des chretiens". Vigiliae Christianae. 16 (2): 65–70. doi:10.2307/1582133. JSTOR 1582133.
- ———————; Schiby, J. (1968). "Une Synagogue Samaritaine a Thessalonique". Revue Biblique (1946-). 75 (3): 368–378. JSTOR 44087982.
- ——————— (1970). "Du Nouveau sur les "Sympathisants"". Journal for the Study of Judaism in the Persian, Hellenistic, and Roman Period. 1 (1). Brill: 77–84. doi:10.1163/157006370X00065. JSTOR 24656215.
- ——————— (1976). "Bleigewichte aus Palästina und Syrien". Zeitschrift des Deutschen Palästina-Vereins. 92 (2): 168–187. JSTOR 27931038.
