= Sankt Georgen Graduate School of Philosophy and Theology =

Jesuit college in Frankfurt am Main, Germany

Coordinates: 50°05′55″N 8°42′43″E

- Philosophisch-Theologische Hochschule Sankt Georgen
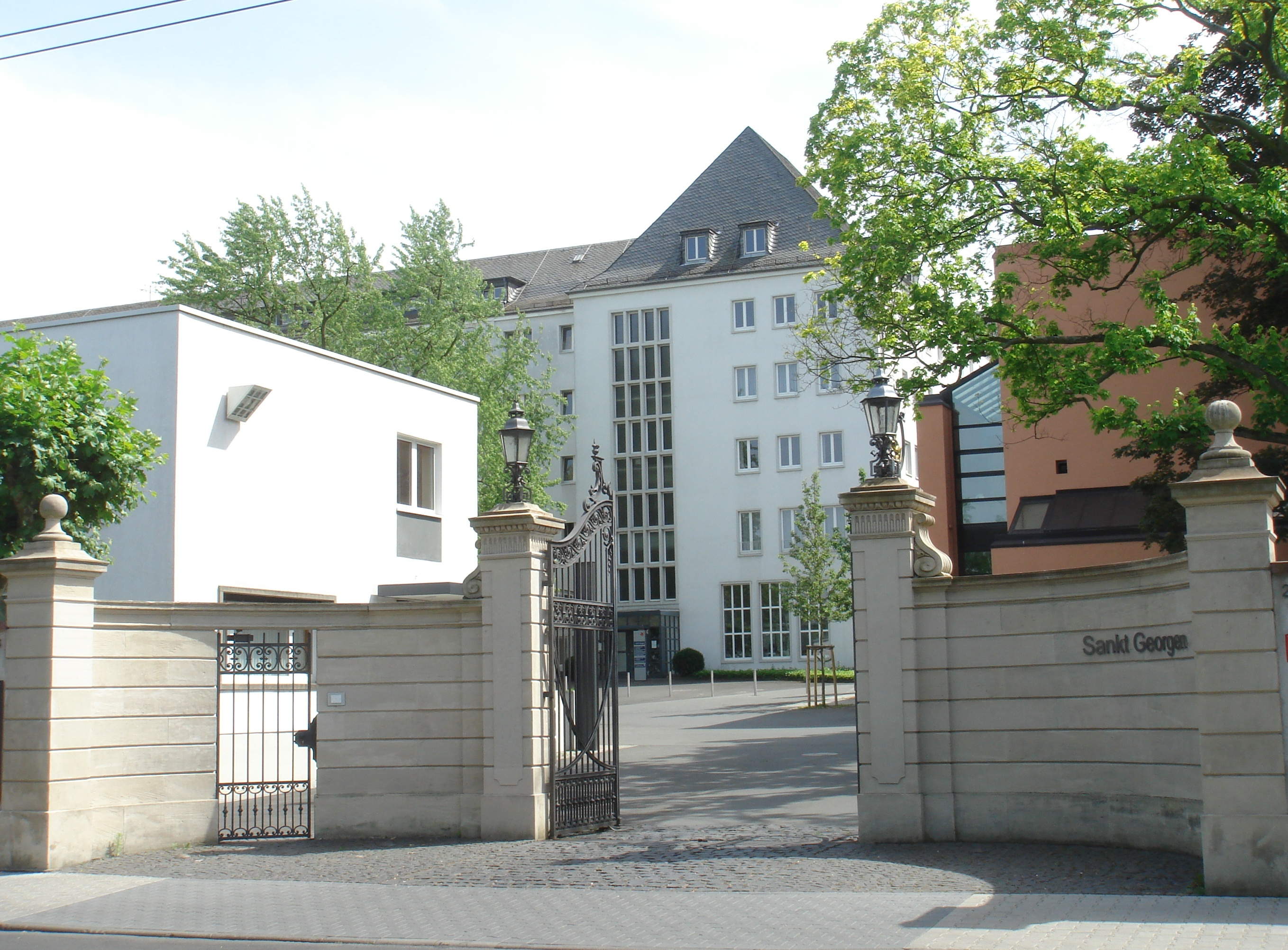
- Motto: Pietati et scientiae
- Motto in English: For piety and knowledge
- Type: College (higher education)
- Established: 1926; 100 years ago
- Religious affiliation: Catholic Church, Society of Jesus
- Rector: Wolfgang Beck
- Academic staff: 60 (17 professors)
- Students: 260
- Postgraduates: 130
- Location: Frankfurt am Main, Hesse, Germany
- Website: www.sankt-georgen.de

Sankt Georgen Graduate School of Philosophy and Theology (German: Philosophisch-Theologische Hochschule Sankt Georgen) is a higher education Jesuit college in Frankfurt am Main, Germany.

The school offers a 10-semester Magister in Catholic Theology and a 6-semester Bachelor in Practical Theology (“Kirchliche Praxis in säkularer Gesellschaft”). Post-graduate students may earn the degrees of Licentiate (Lic. theol.), Doctorate (Dr. theol., Ph.D.), or Habilitation (Dr. theol. habil.). Additional certificates in Philosophy and various interdisciplinary programs such as Christian-Muslim dialogue, Media and Communications, or Ethics in Medical professions are offered as well.

== Campus and institutions ==
The campus, situated within a historic park in the Sachsenhausen district of Frankfurt, contains the classroom building, the office building (Lindenhaus), the academic library, the college restaurant (Mensa), the major seminary, the college church, and the Jesuit community.

The campus hosts as well two institutions founded by the German Bishops' Conference: the Institute for Global Church and Mission (IWM) and an Institute for Christian-Muslim relations (Cibedo). Its library, with more than 12,000 volumes, stands out as the largest library for Christian-Muslim dialogue in Germany. The main college library, which incorporated the collections of various Jesuit libraries and holds nearly 500,000 volumes, is known for its rich collection of Jesuit-related literature.

In the interdiocesan major seminary, seminarians of several German dioceses, mainly of Limburg, Hamburg, Osnabrück, Hildesheim, and Aachen have studied for the Roman Catholic priesthood. Post-graduate students, mostly priests, from all over the world reside in the same seminary, pursuing doctoral or licentiate programs.

== History ==
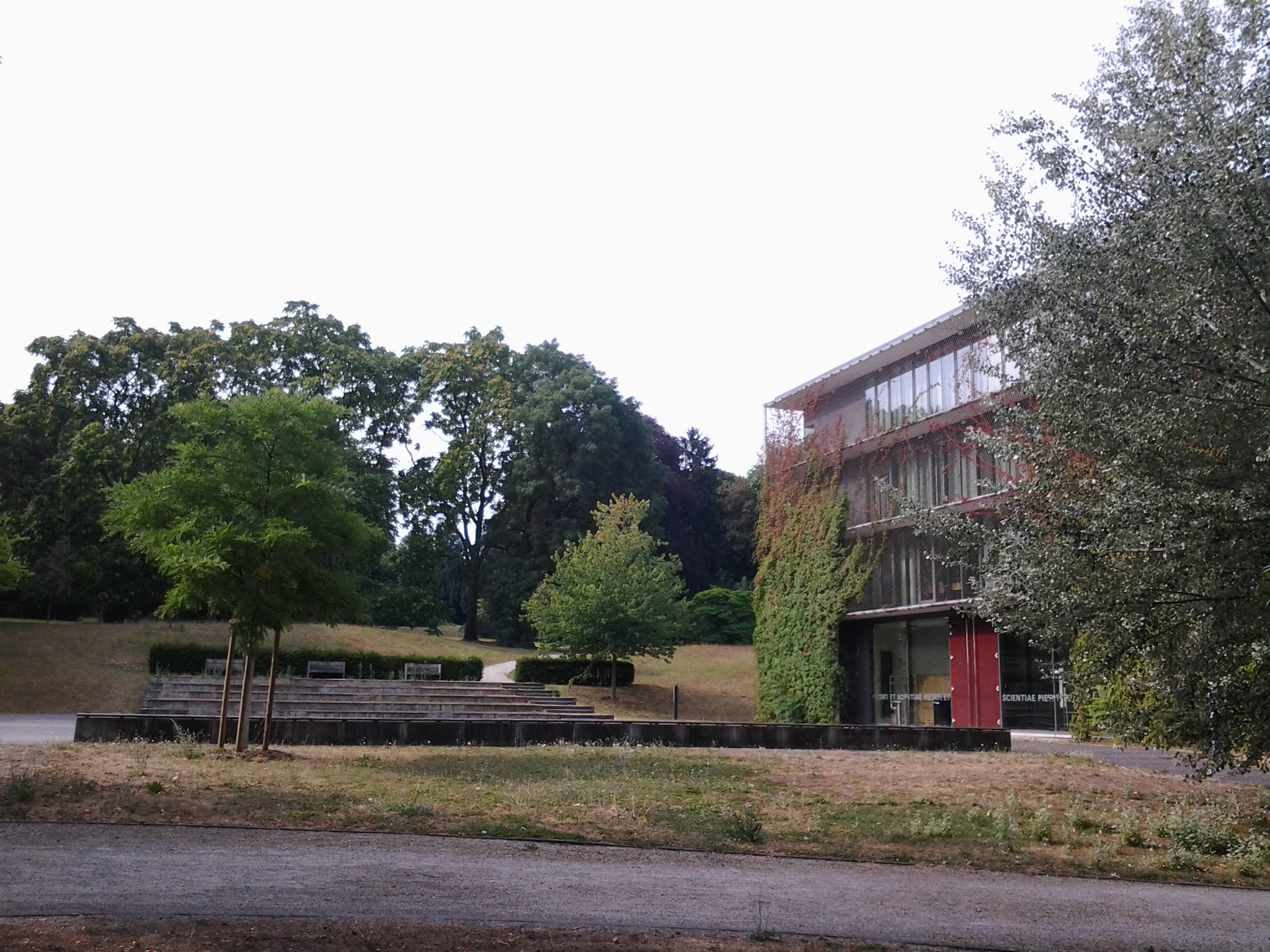
The 2005 classroom building and the park behind the college

The school was founded in 1926 by the Society of Jesus as an academic seminary for training candidates to the priesthood, initially only for the Diocese of Limburg, but soon for other German dioceses as well. Until 1951 the school was exclusively an (inter-)diocesan seminary, led by Jesuits. From 1951 until 1975, the school included two parallel institutions: the Philosophical-Theological Academy for diocesan candidates and the Theological Faculty S.J. for Jesuit students. In 1976, the school began admitting lay theology students (male and female), and these quickly formed the majority of students.

In 1986, Jorge Mario Bergoglio, from 2013 to 2025 Pope Francis, spent a few months at the Sankt Georgen PTH to consult with professors on a dissertation project, however he did not pursue the project further.

The 1993 college church and the 2005 classroom building are both notable works of modern architecture.

== Notable people ==
=== Faculty ===
- Oswald von Nell-Breuning SJ (1890–1991)
- Aloys Grillmeier SJ (1910–1998)
- Otto Semmelroth SJ (1912–1979)
- Norbert Lohfink SJ (1928–2024)
- Rupert Lay SJ (1929–2023)
- Friedhelm Hengsbach SJ (born 1937)

=== Alumni ===
- Stephan Ackermann (born 1963), Bishop of Trier (Germany)
- Karl Josef Becker (1928–2015), Jesuit, theologian, cardinal
- Alfred Delp (1907–1945), Jesuit and philosopher of the German Resistance during the Second World War
- Farid Esack (born 1959), South African Muslim scholar and political activist
- Luis Ladaria Ferrer (born 1944), Jesuit, Cardinal, Prefect of the Congregation for the Doctrine of the Faith
- Jean-Claude Hollerich (born 1958), Jesuit, Cardinal, Archbishop of Luxembourg
- Wilhelm Kempf (1906–1982), Catholic theologian, Bishop of Limburg 1949–1981
- Federico Lombardi (born 1942), Italian Jesuit, former director of the Holy See Press Office
- Juan Antonio Martínez Camino (born 1953), Jesuit, Auxiliary Bishop in Madrid
- Blessed Johannes Prassek (1911–1943), priest opposing the Nazi regime, one of the Lübeck martyrs
- Jon Sobrino (born 1938), Jesuit and theologian (liberation theology) in El Salvador
- Michael Wüstenberg (born 1954), Bishop emeritus of Aliwal (South Africa)
- Lothar Zenetti (1926–2019), German priest and writer

== See also ==
- Munich School of Philosophy
- List of Jesuit sites
