= Dominique Barthélemy (biblical scholar) =

Jean-Dominique Barthélemy OP (16 May 1921, Pallet — 10 February 2002, Freiburg), was a emeritus French professor, Dominican priest and biblical scholar. He entered orders in 1940 and was ordained priest in 1947.

== Life ==
Dominique Barthélemy was born on May 16, 1921, in Pallet near Nantes.

In 1939, Barthélemy entered in the Dominican order, studying first in Paris and then in Jerusalem (1949–1951).

It was at the French Biblical and Archaeological School of Jerusalem that he began to work as a university teacher and researcher.

He studied the Dead Sea Scrolls, and in collaboration with Józef Milik, he published manuscript fragments found in Qumran Cave 1

From 1957 to 1991 he then became Professor of Old Testament at the Theological Faculty University of Fribourg, Switzerland, and from 1964 to 1965 he was dean of the Theology Faculty. From 1970 to 1978 he was Vice-Chancellor of the University of Fribourg.

From 1953 he was interested in small fragments of the minor prophets (8HevXII gr), and published in 1963 Les Devanciers d'Aquila ("The Predecessors of Aquila"), in which he brings revolutionary assumptions about revisions and Greek translations of the Old Testament. During the years 1969-1980, he served on the Hebrew Old Testament Text Project committee, "research[ing] the pertinent history of exegesis of each [Hebrew Bible text critical] problem up to the modern critical period."

He is also known for his introductory book to reading the Bible, Dieu et son image ("God and his image").

== Bibliography ==
- Qumran Cave I, with Józef Milik, Clarendon Press, Oxford, 1955.
- Dieu et son image: ébauche d'une théologie biblique, Éditions du Cerf, 1963.
- Les Devanciers d'Aquila, Éditions du Cerf, 1963.
- Critique textuelle de l'Ancien Testament : rapport final du Comite pour l'analyse textuelle de l'Ancien Testament hébreu, 1982-2015.
- Découvrir l'Écriture, Éditions du Cerf, 2000.

== See also ==
- Hebrew Old Testament Text Project
- Kaige revision
- Aquila of Sinope
- Theodotion
