= Jugendbund Neudeutschland =

German Catholic anti-Nazi organization

The organization's logo

The Jugendbund Neudeutschland ('Youth Federation New Germany') is a German Catholic organization, founded in 1919 following a recommendation by Felix von Hartmann, the Archbishop of Cologne. During the Weimar Republic, it was closely affiliated with the Catholic Centre Party. The organisation opposed Nazism and was banned by the Nazi regime in 1933. After World War II, it was re-established as Bund Neudeutschland and enlarged, comprising a wing for secondary school students, another for university students, and a third one for those who were no longer students, but wished to continue in the movement. The student wings then merged with the parallel girls movement Heliand and formed the Katholische Studierende Jugend, which is affiliated with the International Young Christian Students.

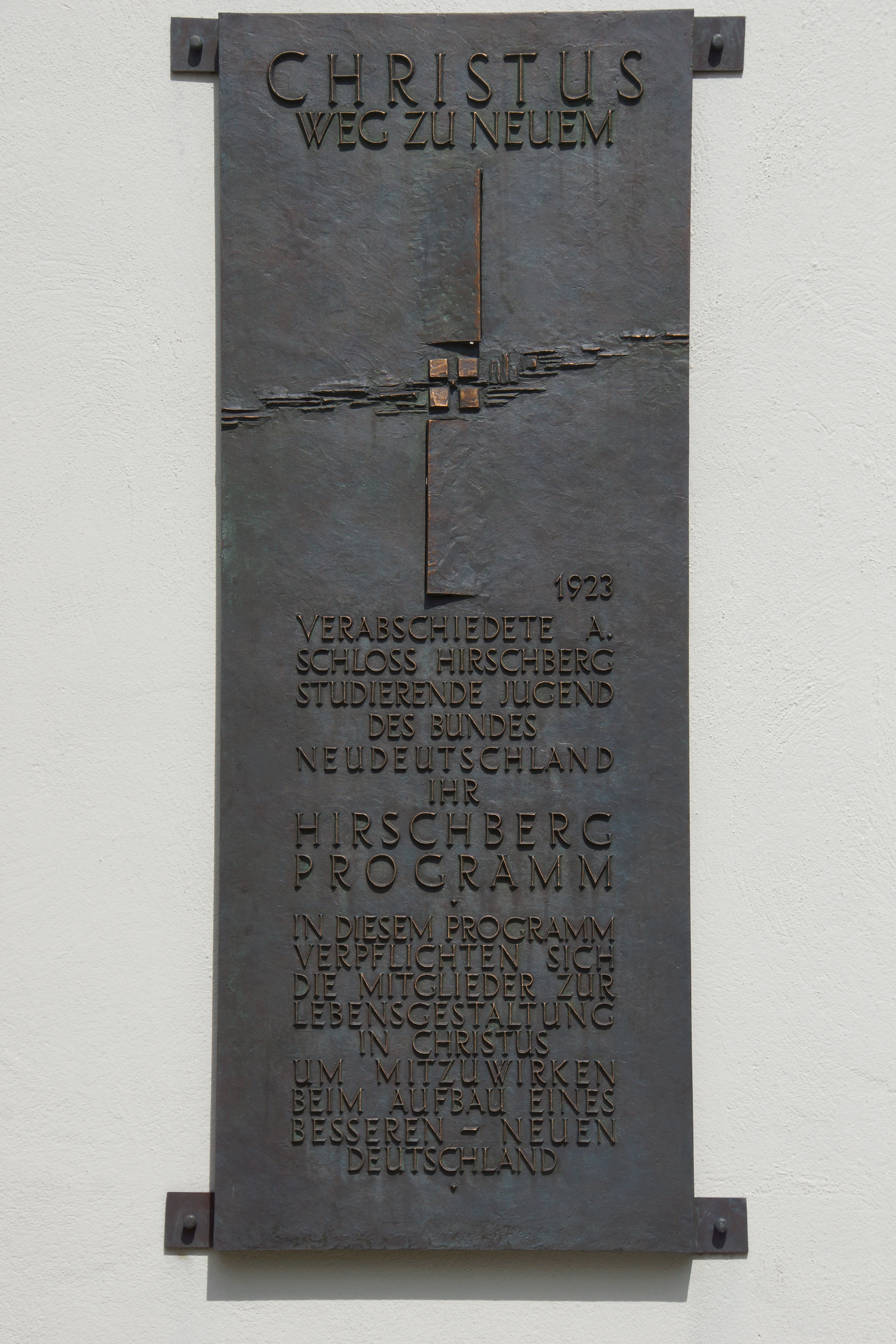
Memorial at Hirschberg Castle (Beilngries)

== Former members ==
- Hans Filbinger, a leading member of Jugendbund Neudeutschland in Baden in the early 1930s
- Bernhard Vogel (politician)
