= Gerhard Lohfink =

German Catholic priest and theologian (1934–2024)

- Gerhard Lohfink, c. 2000
- Born: 29 August 1934; Frankfurt am Main, Germany
- Died: 2 April 2024 (aged 89); Ebenhausen, Bavaria, Germany
- Education: Goethe University Frankfurt; Hochschule Sankt Georgen; Ludwig-Maximilians-Universität München; University of Würzburg
- Occupations: Priest; Theologian
- Organizations: University of Tübingen; Catholic Integrated Community

Ecclesiastical career
- Church: Catholic Church
- Ordained: 1960
- Congregations served: St. Ursula, Oberursel

Gerhard Lohfink (29 August 1934 – 2 April 2024) was a German Catholic priest and theologian. He was a professor of the New Testament at the University of Tübingen until 1986. Lohfink worked as a theologian in the Catholic Integrated Community (KIG). Many of his books were translated into other languages; some English versions became bestsellers, including Jesus and Community. The Social Dimension of Christian faith, translated in 1984.

== Biography ==
Lohfink was born in Frankfurt am Main on 29 August 1934; his father was a train driver. His older brother, Norbert Lohfink, became a professor of the Old Testament. Lohfink completed schooling at the Heinrich-von-Gagern-Gymnasium in 1954. He spent two semesters with German and Latin studies at the Johann Wolfgang Goethe University in Frankfurt am Main. From 1955 on, he studied philosophy and theology at the Hochschule Sankt Georgen. In 1957, he passed the philosophical final examination. In 1957 and 1958, he studied theology at the Catholic Theological Faculty of the Ludwig-Maximilians-Universität München. He passed the theological final examination in 1960 at the University of St. Georgen, in the same year he was ordained a priest by Wilhelm Kempf, bishop of Limburg. From 1961 to 1963, he was chaplain in the parish of St. Ursula in Oberursel.

Bishop Kempf granted permission for Lohfink to pursue a doctorate in theology with the requirement that he would initially serve as a pastor for a year in Frankfurt. In 1964, he continued his studies in theology at the University of Würzburg. In 1971 Lohfink earned his doctorate with the dissertation The Ascension of Jesus: Studies on the Ascension and Exaltation texts in Lukas, supervised by Rudolf Schnackenburg. He was habilitated in 1973 with his work The Collection of Israel: An examination of Lukan Ecclesiology.

In 1973, Lohfink became a lecturer of the New Testament at the Catholic theological faculty of the University of Tübingen, appointed professor in 1976. In 1979 and 1980, he was involved as a deputy of the theological faculty in the ecclesiastical dispute over Hans Küng. In the end, Lohfink publicly voted for Küng's exclusion from the faculty. In 1982, he published a book, translated in 1984 by David L. Balch as Jesus and Community. The Social Dimension of Christian faith. It was translated privately into Hungarian, and influenced Christians in Hungary who lived in a Communist regime.

In 1987, Lohfink followed the ideas from his book, that church is best realised in community; he left the university voluntarily to live in Bad Tölz and work in a Catholic Integrated Community (KiG). He lived there with his aging parents. He was active in the community, especially teaching German to members from Tanzania. He later continued to research and lecture on ecclesiology and eschatology. In his books he tried hard to achieve a language that was simple, modern and comprehensible, having in mind readers such as his parents. The KiG was dissolved in Bavaria in 2020 after investigations, but he remained living in community with others.

Lohfink's books have been translated into many languages, such as Korean. Translations into English became bestsellers. The book about the parables of Jesus was awarded the first prize from the American Catholic Media Association in 2022. He completed the book Warum ich an Gott glaube (Why I believe in God) shortly before his death, as a personal legacy.

Lohfink died in Ebenhausen, his last residence, on 2 April 2024, at the age of 89, after a short severe illness.

== Publications ==
Lohfink published many books, most of them in German by Herder. Many of them were translated into English by his student Linda M. Maloney.

=== Books in German ===
- Die Himmelfahrt Jesu – Erfindung oder Erfahrung? Verlag Katholisches Bibelwerk, Stuttgart 1972, ISBN 978-3-460-10181-4.
- Die Sammlung Israels. Eine Untersuchung zur lukanischen Ekklesiologie. Kösel, München 1975, ISBN 978-3-466-25339-5.
- Wie hat Jesus Gemeinde gewollt? Zur gesellschaftlichen Dimension des christlichen Glaubens. Herder, Freiburg im Breisgau 1982, ISBN 978-3-451-08798-1
- Gottes Taten gehen weiter : Geschichtstheologie als Grundvollzug neutestamentlichen Gemeinden. Herder, Freiburg im Breisgau 1984, ISBN 978-3-451-20343-5.
- Die Bibel: Gotteswort in Menschenwort. Verlag Katholisches Bibelwerk, Stuttgart 1986, ISBN 978-3-460-10015-2.
- Wem gilt die Bergpredigt? zur Glaubwürdigkeit des Christlichen. Herder, Freiburg im Breisgau 1993, ISBN 978-3-451-08777-6.
- Braucht Gott die Kirche? – zur Theologie des Volkes Gottes. Herder, Freiburg im Breisgau 1998, ISBN 978-3-451-26544-0
- Das Vaterunser neu ausgelegt. Urfeld, Bad Tölz 2007, ISBN 978-3-932857-32-4.
- with Ludwig Weimer: Maria – nicht ohne Israel. Eine neue Sicht der Lehre von der unbefleckten Empfängnis. Herder, Freiburg im Breisgau 2008; 2nd edition 2012, ISBN 978-3-451-34139-7.
- Welche Argumente hat der neue Atheismus? Eine kritische Auseinandersetzung. Urfeld, Bad Tölz 2008, ISBN 978-3-932857-33-1.
- Der letzte Tag Jesu. Was bei der Passion wirklich geschah. Verlag Katholisches Bibelwerk, Stuttgart 2009, ISBN 978-3-460-33179-2.
- Beten schenkt Heimat. Theologie und Praxis des christlichen Gebets. Herder, Freiburg im Breisgau 2010, ISBN 978-3-451-33052-0.
- Jesus von Nazareth. Was er wollte, wer er war. Herder, Freiburg im Breisgau 2011, ISBN 978-3-451-34095-6.
- Gegen die Verharmlosung Jesu. Reden über Jesus und die Kirche. Herder, Freiburg im Breisgau 2013 e-book -, ISBN 978-3-451-34561-6.
- Der neue Atheismus. Eine kritische Auseinandersetzung. Verlag Katholisches Bibelwerk, Stuttgart 2014, ISBN 978-3-460-30031-6.
- Auf der Erde – wo sonst? Unangepasstes über Gott und die Welt. Verlag Katholisches Bibelwerk, Stuttgart 2015, ISBN 978-3-460-30033-0.
- Im Ringen um die Vernunft. Reden über Israel, die Kirche und die Europäische Aufklärung. Herder, Freiburg im Breisgau 2016, ISBN 978-3-451-31239-7.
- Am Ende das Nichts? Über Auferstehung und ewiges Leben. Herder, Freiburg im Breisgau 2017, ISBN 978-3-451-31104-8
- Das Geheimnis des Galiläers – Ein Nachtgespräch über Jesus von Nazareth. Herder, Freiburg im Breisgau 2019, ISBN 978-3-451-38270-3.
- Die wichtigsten Worte Jesu, 2022
- Am Ende des Nichts?, 2024
- Warum ich an Gott glaube, 2024.

=== Books translated into English ===
- The Gospels. God's Word in Human Words. Chicago 1972, Franciscan Herald Press (Herald Biblical booklets), ISBN 978-0-8199-0212-2
- with Malina, Bruce J. The conversion of St. Paul: Narrative and History in Acts. Chicago 1976, Franciscan Herald Press. 1976 ISBN 978-0-8199-0572-7
- Death is Not the Final Word. Chicago 1977: Franciscan Herald Press (Synthesis series). ISBN 978-0-8199-0715-8
- The Bible: Now I Get It! A Form-criticism Handbook, Garden City, N.Y. 1979: Doubleday. ISBN 978-0-385-13432-3
- Jesus and Community. The Social Dimension of Christian faith. Philadelphia, New York, 1984 Fortress Press; Paulist Press. ISBN 978-0-8091-2661-3
- The Last Day of Jesus. An Enriching Portrayal of the Passion. Notre Dame, 1984, Ind.: Ave Maria Press. ISBN 978-0-87793-312-0
- Does God Need the Church? Toward a Theology of the People of God. Collegeville, MN, 2014, Liturgical Press. ISBN 978-0-8146-5928-1
- No Irrelevant Jesus. On Jesus and the Church Today. Collegeville, MN, 2014, Liturgical Press. ISBN 978-0-8146-8289-0
- Jesus of Nazareth. What He Wanted, Who He was. Collegeville, Minn., 2015, Liturgical Press. ISBN 978-0-8146-8308-8
- Is This All There Is? On Resurrection and Eternal Life, Collegeville, Minnesota 2018. ISBN 978-0-8146-8451-1
- The Our Father. A New Reading. Collegeville (Liturgical Press) 2019, ISBN 978-0-8146-6449-0
- Prayer Takes Us Home. The Theology and Practice of Christian Prayer. Collegeville (Liturgical Press) 2020, ISBN 978-0-8146-8806-9
- The Forty Parables of Jesus. Collegeville (Liturgical Press) 2021, ISBN 978-0-8146-8510-5
- The Christian Faith Explained in 50 Letters. New York (Paulist Press) 2022, ISBN 978-0-8091-5478-4

=== Articles ===
- Did Jesus Found a Church? In: Theology Digest (30), 1982, page 231–235.
- Did the Early Christians Understand Jesus? Nonviolence, Love of Neighbor, and Imminent Expectation. In: Plough Quarterly Magazine (8), 2016.

== Reviews ==
- Thomas D. Stegman (2013): The Living Presence of God. Jesus of Nazareth by Gerhard Lohfink. In: America The Jesuit Review 2013. (18 March 2013)
- James Martin (2013): Jesus, by the Book (reviewing Jesus of Nazareth: Who He Was, What He Wanted.). America The Jesuit Review.
- Stanley Hauerwas (2014): The Untamed Jesus (reviewing: No Irrelevant Jesus. On Jesus and the Church Today. The Christian Century.
- Wholeness is the Inmost Principle of the Sermon on the Mount. Cruciform Phronesis.
