= Ludwig Weimer =

German theologian and priest

Ludwig Weimer (born February 3, 1940, in Eichenbühl) is a German theologian and priest of the Catholic Integrated Community.

== Life and work ==
Ludwig Weimer attended the Humanistic Gymnasium in Miltenberg, Bavaria. From 1960 to 1968, he studied philosophy, theology and German studies at the University of Würzburg and LMU Munich and obtained the theological diploma. Further studies followed at the Institute for Catechetics and Homiletics in Munich. In 1971, he finished his theological dissertation on the subject of "Religion and Revelation by Ernst Bloch" with Heinrich Fries. From 1974 to 1979, he habilitated on the systematic topic of "Grace and Freedom" with Joseph Ratzinger at the University of Regensburg.

Since 1968, Weimer is a theologian in the Integrated Community (Integrierte Gemeinde), Munich. He was ordained a priest in 1983 and is a member of the "Community of Priests Serving Integrated Communities". In his theological work he focused on Jewish-Christian dialogue.

He is a member of the student group Joseph Ratzinger (Pope Benedict XVI) since its founding in 1978.

In 2003, Weimer became director of a newly founded Academy for the Theology of the People of God. The work of this Academy has been continued since 2009 by the Foundation Chair "Theology of the People of God" at the Pastoral Institute Redemptor Hominis of the Pontifical Lateran University in Rome. Weimer was the founding director of this chair. He is the main author of the teaching letters for the postgraduate distance learning course, which was offered by the chair from September 2016 in the form of a two-year study program in German and English.

== Writings (selection) ==
=== Monographs ===
- Das Verständnis von Religion und Offenbarung bei Ernst Bloch, Dissertation, Ludwig-Maximilians-Universität München, Faculty of Theology, 1971, DNB 720406757
- Die Lust an Gott und seiner Sache oder Lassen sich Gnade und Freiheit, Glaube und Vernunft, Erlösung und Befreiung vereinbaren? Freiburg i.Br.: Herder 1981, two editions, Herder, Freiburg i.Br. 1981, ISBN 3-451-19195-4 (Zugl. Habilitationsschrift, University of Regensburg 1979)
- Christsein angesichts der vielen Religionen, (Urfeld series, vol. 3), Publisher Urfeld, Bad Tölz 2002, ISBN 3-932857-22-4
- Wo ist das Christentum? Sören Kierkegaard re-read (Urfelder texts, vol. 3). Publisher Urfeld, Bad Tölz 2004, ISBN 3-932857-43-7
- 30 Jahre Wegbegleitung Joseph Ratzinger/Papst Benedikt XVI. und die Katholische Integrierte Gemeinde. Publisher Urfeld, Bad Tölz 2006, ISBN 978-3-932857-40-9 (together with Traudl Wallbrecher and Arnold Stötzel)
- Wie Gott zu seinem Volk kam: Biblische Geschichten neu gelesen von Abraham bis Rut, Publisher Urfeld, Bad Tölz 2003, ISBN 978-3-93285-712-6 (together with Bernhard Koch and Arnold Stötzel)
- Der Jude Jesus von Nazareth. Zum Gespräch zwischen Jacob Neusner und Papst Benedikt XVI. Bonifatius Druckerei, Paderborn 2009, ISBN 978-3-89710-419-8 (together with Achim Buckenmaier and Rudolf Pesch)
- Maria – nicht ohne Israel. Eine neue Sicht der Lehre von der Unbefleckten Empfängnis. Herder, Freiburg im Breisgau 2008, ISBN 978-3-451-34139-7 (together with Gerhard Lohfink)
  - in Italien: Maria non senza Israele, Volume I-III, Bari: Ecumenica editrice 2010. I: ISBN 978-88-88758-55-8, II: ISBN 978-88-88758-56-5, III: ISBN 978-88-88758-57-2
- Die sieben Zeichen des Messias. Das eine Volk Gottes als Sakrament für die Welt, Friedrich Pustet, Regensburg 2012, ISBN 978-3-7917-2426-3 (together with Achim Buckenmaier and Arnold Stötzel.)

=== Essays ===
- Aufsätze und Auslegungen von Bibeltexten in: Verein zur Förderung Theologischer Forschung und Bildung e.V. (Hrsg.): Die integrierte Gemeinde. Christliche Existenz in einer säkularen Welt; Beiträge zur Reform der Kirche, Bd. 1–17 (1969–1976) (Articles in: Association for the Promotion of Theological Research and Education e.V. (ed.): The integrated community. Christian existence in a secular world; contributions to the reform of the church, Vol. 1–17 (1969–1976) ASIN: B00L4NGVS, et al)
- Weisheit als Gabe des Heiligen Geistes. Ein Beitrag zum Problem des Handelns Gottes in der Welt. In: Walter S. Baier, Otto Horn, Christoph Schönborn, Vinzenz Pfnür, Siegfried Wiedenhofer, Ludwig Weimer (Hrsg.): Weisheit Gottes – Weisheit der Welt. Festschrift für Joseph Kardinal Ratzinger zum 60. Geburtstag, Bd. 2. EOS Verlag, St. Ottilien 1987, pp. 1245–1278, ISBN 3-88096-185-9 (Wisdom as a gift of the Holy Spirit. A contribution to the problem of God's action in the world).
- Wodurch kam das Sprechen von Vorsehung und Handeln Gottes in die Krise? Analyse und Deutung des Problemstands seit der Aufklärung, in: Vorsehung und Handeln Gottes, hrsg. Von Theodor Schneider und Lothar Ullrich, Erfurter Theologische Schriften Nr. 16, Leipzig: St. Benno-Verlag 1988, 17–71, ISBN 3-7462-0283-3 (How did the talk of God's providence and action come into crisis? Analysis and interpretation of the problem statement since the Enlightenment)
- Zur Theologie des "Religionspluralismus". In: Internationale katholische Zeitschrift Communio, Vol. 28 (1999), pp. 439–453, ISSN 0341-8693 (The theology of "religious pluralism")
- Der Segen der Christentumskritik. In: Robert Leicht (Hrsg.): Geburtsfehler? Vom Fluch und Segen des Christentums, Berlin: Wiechern-Verlag 2001, pp. 95–118, ISBN 3-88981-126-4. (The blessing of criticism of Christianity)
- Die Baugesetze der Geschichtstheologie Joseph Ratzingers. In: Gerhard Nachtwei (Hrsg.), Hoffnung auf Vollendung. Zur Eschatologie von Joseph Ratzinger (Ratzinger-Studien Bd. 8), Regensburg: Friedrich Pustet 2015, pp. 55–74, ISBN 978-3-7917-2732-5 (The Construction Laws of Joseph Ratzinger's Theory of History)
- Und Gott war das Wort – Wie können wir ihn heute hören? Die Antwort Joseph Ratzingers. Catechesis in Munich church St. Peter on 5 February 2016, printed in Mitteilungen Institut Papst Benedikt XVI., 9/2016, pp. 46–61, editors Rudolf Voderholzer, Christian Schaller, Franz-Xaver Heibl, Schnell & Steiner, Regensburg 2016, ISBN 978-3-7954-3196-9
