= Minuscule 180 =

Minuscule 180 (see also 2918)
- New Testament manuscript
- Text: Gospels
- Date: 12th-13th centuries
- Script: Greek
- Now at: Vatican Library
- Size: 18.7 cm by 13.5 cm
- Type: Byzantine/mixed
- Category: V (Acts III)
- Note: marginalia

Minuscule 180 (in the Gregory-Aland numbering), ε 1498, α 300 (Soden), is a Greek minuscule manuscript of the New Testament, on parchment. The Gospels palaeographically have been assigned to the 12th century, the rest of New Testament books are dated by colophon to the 1273. Formerly it was deciphered as the year 1284. It has complex contents with full marginalia.

== Description ==
The codex contains the entire of the New Testament on 444 elegant parchment leaves (size 18.7 cm by 13.5 cm), with some apocryphal books. The Gregory-Aland number 180 has been retained for the Gospels, whereas the rest of the New Testament contained in the Codex has been renumbered GA-2918. The text is written in one column per page, in 22-26 lines per page, in light-brown or dark-brown ink, capital letters in red.

The text is divided according to the κεφαλαια (chapters), whose numbers are given at the margin, and the τιτλοι (titles of chapters) at the top of the pages. There is also a division according to the Ammonian Sections, with references to the Eusebian Canons (written below Ammonian Section numbers).

It contains tables of the κεφαλαια (tables of contents), and lectionary markings at the margin for liturgical use. Liturgical books with hagiographies, Synaxarion and Menologion were added in the 15th century.

Order of books: Gospels, Acts, Catholic epistles, Pauline epistles, and Apocalypse. In Apocalypse last verse (22:21) and part of verse 21 is omitted. The Apocalypse is ending on 22:20 on word αμην.

It contains the Eusebian Canons. In the 15th century were added synaxaria and Menologion on paper.

== Text ==
The Greek text of the codex is the Byzantine except in the Book of Acts. Hermann von Soden classified it to the textual family K^{x}. Aland assigned it to Category V except the Book of Acts (Category III). In Apocalypse is close to Uncial 046.

According to the Claremont Profile Method it represents textual family Kx in Luke 1 and Luke 20, and creates textual cluster 180.

== History ==
The Gospels were written by one Andreas, the rest of the New Testament and some apocryphal books by one John, November 1273.

The manuscript came from Cyprus, and together with Codex Borgianus, and Lectionary 37, belonged to the Velitran Museum of "Praesul Steph. Borgia, Collegii Urbani de Propaganda Fide a secretis".

It was examined by Bianchini, Birch (about 1782), and Scholz. C. R. Gregory saw the manuscript in 1886. Herman C. Hoskier collated text of the Apocalypse.

It is currently housed at the Vatican Library (Borgiae gr. 18), at Rome.

== See also ==
- List of New Testament minuscules
- Biblical manuscript
- Textual criticism
