= Uncial 0159 =

- New Testament manuscript
- Text: Ephesians 4:21-24; 5:1-3
- Date: 6th century
- Script: Greek
- Now at: Qubbat al-Khazna
- Size: 24 x 17 cm
- Type: mixed
- Category: III

Uncial 0159 (in the Gregory-Aland numbering), α 1040 (in the Soden numbering), is a Greek uncial manuscript of the New Testament, dated palaeographically to the 6th century.

== Description ==
The codex contains a small part of the Epistle to the Ephesians 4:21-24; 5:1-3, on one parchment leaf (24 cm by 17 cm). The text is written in two columns per page, 25 lines per page, in uncial letters. It is a palimpsest, the upper text is in Arabic, it contains the Gospel of Luke.

The Greek text of this codex is mixed. Kurt Aland placed it in Category III.

It is dated by the Institute for New Testament Textual Research to the 6th century.

The codex used to be held in Qubbat al-Khazna in Damascus. The present location of the codex is unknown. The manuscript is not accessible.

== See also ==
- List of New Testament uncials
- Biblical manuscript
- Textual criticism
