= Uncial 0249 =

- New Testament manuscript
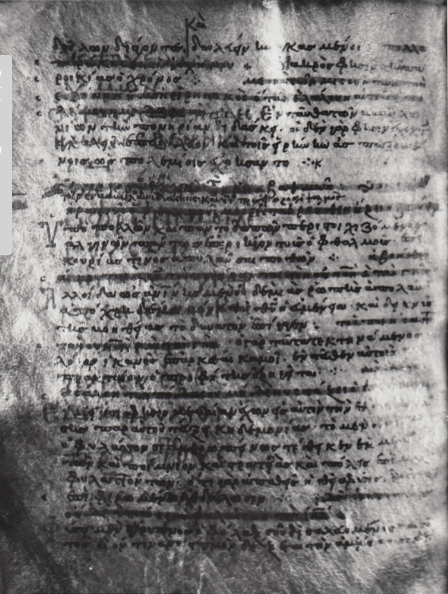
- Text: Matthew 25:1-9
- Date: 10th century
- Script: Greek
- Now at: Bodleian Library
- Size: 21 cm by 15 cm
- Type: mixed
- Category: III

Uncial 0249 (in the Gregory-Aland numbering), is a Greek uncial manuscript of the New Testament. Paleographically it has been assigned to the 10th century.

== Description ==
The codex contains the text of the Gospel of Matthew 25:1-9, on 2 parchment leaves (21 cm by 15 cm), with some lacunae. Possibly it was written in two columns per page, 15 lines per page, in uncial letters. Survived leaves are in a fragmentary condition.

It is a palimpsest, the upper text contains the text of Psalms with a commentary.

Currently it is dated by the INTF to the 10th century.

== Location ==
Currently the codex is housed at the Bodleian Library (MS. Auct. T. 4.21, ff. 326, 327) in Oxford.

== Text ==
The Greek text of this codex is mixed with a strong element of the Byzantine text-type. Aland placed it in Category III.

== See also ==
- List of New Testament uncials
- Textual criticism
