= Uncial 062 =

- New Testament manuscript
- Text: Galatians
- Date: 5th century
- Script: Greek
- Now at: Qubbat al-Khazna
- Size: 22 x 18.5 cm
- Type: mixed
- Category: III

Uncial 062 (in the Gregory-Aland numbering) ε 64 (Soden), is a Greek uncial manuscript of the New Testament on parchment, dated palaeographically to the 5th century.

== Description ==
The codex contains a part of the Epistle to the Galatians (4:15-5:14), survived only one leaf (22 cm by 18.5 cm). The text is written in two columns per page, 33 lines per page. It is a palimpsest. The upper text is Arabic.

The Greek text of this codex Aland placed it in Category III.

It is dated by the Institute for New Testament Textual Research to the 5th century.

The codex used to be located in Damascus, in Qubbat al-Khazna (Ms. E 7332).

== See also ==
- List of New Testament uncials
- Textual criticism
