= Uncial 0229 =

- New Testament manuscript
- Text: Revelation 18:16-17; 19:4-6
- Date: 8th-century
- Script: Greek
- Now at: Laurentian Library
- Size: 11 x 23 cm
- Type: mixed
- Category: III

Uncial 0229 (in the Gregory-Aland numbering), is a Greek uncial manuscript of the New Testament. The manuscript paleographically has been assigned to the 8th century. It is a palimpsest.

== Description ==
The manuscript contains a small part of the Book of Revelation (18:16-17; 19:4-6), on two parchment leaves (11 cm by 23 cm). The text is written in one column per page, 16 lines per page.

It is a palimpsest, the lower text is Coptic. It contains a calendar text with list of Egyptian months.

The Greek text of this codex is mixed. Kurt Aland placed it in Category III.

Guglielmo Cavallo dated the manuscript to the 7th or 8th century. It is dated by the Institute for New Testament Textual Research to the 8th century.

The manuscript was found in Antinoopolis (El-Sheikh Ibada) in Egypt. It was examined by Giovanni Mercati (1953) and Mario Naldini (1965). Mercati transcribed the text of the codex.

The manuscript was added to the list of the New Testament manuscripts by Kurt Aland in 1953.

The codex used to be housed at the Laurentian Library (PSI 1296b), in Florence. According to the Liste Handschriften, 0229 has been destroyed.

== See also ==
- List of New Testament uncials
- Textual criticism
