= Uncial 0196 =

- New Testament manuscript
- Text: Matthew 5:1-11; Luke 24:26-33
- Date: 9th century
- Script: Greek
- Found: Hatch, 1929
- Now at: National Museum of Damascus
- Size: 18.5 x 14 cm
- Type: unknown
- Category: none

Uncial 0196 (in the Gregory-Aland numbering), is a Greek uncial manuscript of the New Testament, dated paleographically to the 9th century.

== Description ==
The codex contains small parts of Matthew 5:1-11 and Luke 24:26-33, on two parchment leaves (18.5 cm by 14 cm), and is written in one column per page, 19 lines per page, in uncial letters. It is a palimpsest, the lower text is in Syriac, written in estrangela.

The textual character of this codex is unknown. Kurt Aland the Greek text of the codex did not place in any Category.

== History ==
According to Hatch the manuscript was written by Egyptian or Palestinian hand.

It is dated by the Institute for New Testament Textual Research to the 9th century.

The manuscript was discovered in 1929 by Hatch. Ernst von Dobschütz designated it by 0196.

The codex used to be housed at the National Museum of Damascus. The manuscript is not accessible.

== See also ==
- List of New Testament uncials
- Textual criticism
