= Uncial 0241 =

- New Testament manuscript
- Text: 1 Timothy 3:16-4:3,8-11
- Date: 6th century
- Script: Greek
- Now at: Bodmer Library
- Size: ?
- Type: Alexandrian/mixed
- Category: III

Uncial 0241 (in the Gregory-Aland numbering), is a Greek uncial manuscript of the New Testament. Paleographically it has been assigned to the 6th century.

== Description ==
The codex contains a small part of the First Epistle to Timothy 3:16-4:3,8-11, on a fragment of one parchment leaf. Original size of the pages is unknown. Probably it was written in one column per page, 12 lines per page, in uncial letters (originally 28 lines per page).

The manuscript was added to the list of the New Testament manuscripts by Kurt Aland in 1956.

Currently it is dated by the INTF to the 6th century.

== Location ==
Currently the codex is housed at the Bodmer Library (Cod. Bodmer 24) in Cologny.

== Text ==
The Greek text of this codex is a representative of the Alexandrian text-type with some alien readings. Aland placed it in Category III.

== See also ==
- List of New Testament uncials
- Textual criticism
