= Uncial 0219 =

- New Testament manuscript
- Text: Romans 2:21-23; 3:8-9,23-25,27-30
- Date: 4th / 5th century
- Script: Greek
- Now at: Austrian National Library
- Size: 20 x 14 cm
- Type: mixed
- Category: III

Uncial 0219 (in the Gregory-Aland numbering), is a Greek uncial manuscript of the New Testament, dated paleographically to the 4th century (or 5th). The codex contains a small parts of the Epistle to the Romans (2:21-23; 3:8-9,23-25,27-30), on 2 parchment leaves (20 cm by 14 cm). It is written in two columns per page, 26 lines per page.

The Greek text of this codex is mixed. Aland placed it in Category III.

Currently it is dated by the INTF to the 4th or 5th century. It was found in Fayum.

The manuscript was added to the list of the New Testament manuscripts by Kurt Aland in 1953. It was examined by Peter Sanz (1946), Kurt Treu (1976), Pasquale Orsini (2005), and Stanley E. Porter (2008).

The codex is located at the Austrian National Library, in Vienna, with the shelf number Pap. G. 36113, 26083.

== See also ==
- List of New Testament uncials
- Textual criticism
