= Uncial 0182 =

- New Testament manuscript
- Text: Luke 19:18-20,22-24
- Date: 5th century
- Script: Greek
- Now at: Austrian National Library
- Size: 15 x 9 cm
- Type: mixed
- Category: III

Uncial 0182 (in the Gregory-Aland numbering), is a Greek uncial manuscript of the New Testament, dated paleographically to the 5th century.

== Description ==
The codex contains a small parts of the Gospel of Luke 19:18-20,22-24, on one parchment leaf (15 cm by 9 cm). The text is written in one column per page, 21 lines per page, in uncial letters.

The Greek text-text of this codex is mixed. Aland placed it in Category III.

Currently it is dated by the INTF to the 5th century. According to Karl Wessely it was found in Fayyum.

The codex currently is housed at the Papyrus Collection of the Austrian National Library (Pap. G. 39781) in Vienna.

== See also ==
- List of New Testament uncials
- Textual criticism
