= Minuscule 621 =

- New Testament manuscript
- Text: Acts, Catholic epistles, Paul †
- Date: 11th century
- Script: Greek
- Now at: Vatican Library
- Size: 22.5 cm by 16.5 cm
- Type: mixed
- Category: III

Minuscule 621 (in the Gregory-Aland numbering), O ^{46} (von Soden), is a Greek diglot minuscule manuscript of the New Testament, on parchment. Palaeographically it has been assigned to the 11th century. The manuscript is lacunose. Tischendorf labeled it by 154^{a} and 187^{p}.

== Description ==
The codex contains the text of the Acts of the Apostles, Catholic epistles, Epistle to the Romans, and 1 Corinthians 1:1-15:45 on 164 parchment leaves (size 22.5 cm by 16.5 cm) with large lacunae. The text is written in one column per page, 36 lines per page.

It contains Prolegomena, tables of the κεφαλαια (tables of contents) before each book, and lectionary markings at the margin (for liturgical use). It has a commentary.

The order of books: Book of Acts, Catholic epistles, and Pauline epistles. On the list of the Pauline epistles the Hebrews is placed before First Epistle to Timothy.

== Text ==
Aland placed the Greek text of the codex in Category III.

== History ==
F. H. A. Scrivener dated the manuscript to the 15th century. C. R. Gregory dated the manuscript to the 14th century. Actually the INTF dated the manuscript much earlier, to the 11th century.

The manuscript was added to the list of New Testament manuscripts by Johann Martin Augustin Scholz. Gregory saw the manuscript in 1886.

Formerly it was labeled by 154^{a} and 187^{p}. In 1908 Gregory gave the number 621 to it.

The manuscript currently is housed at the Vatican Library (Vat. gr. 1270), in Rome.

== See also ==
- List of New Testament minuscules
- Biblical manuscript
- Textual criticism
