= Minuscule 610 =

- New Testament manuscript
- Text: Acts of the Apostles, Pauline epistles †
- Date: 12th century
- Script: Greek
- Now at: Bibliothèque nationale de France
- Size: 28.4 cm by 21.9 cm
- Type: Byzantine text-type
- Category: V

Minuscule 610 (in the Gregory-Aland numbering), A ^{πρ21} (von Soden), is a Greek minuscule manuscript of the New Testament, on parchment. Palaeographically it has been assigned to the 12th century. The manuscript is lacunose. Formerly it was labeled by 130^{a}.

== Description ==
The codex contains the text of the Acts of the Apostles and Catholic epistles on 177 parchment leaves (size 28.4 cm by 21.9 cm), with lacunae (Acts 20:38-22:3; 2 Peter 1:14-3:18; 1 John 4:11 - Jude 8). The text is written in one column per page, 14 lines per page for the biblical text, and 41 lines for the commentary text.

The text of the Catholic epistles is surrounded by a catena.

== Text ==
The Greek text of the codex is an eclectic. In Book of Acts it has a higher value. Aland placed it in Category III. In the Catholic epistles it is a representative of the Byzantine text-type. Aland placed it in Category V.

Hermann von Soden lists it as I^{a1}. Other members of this group are: 36, 307, 453, 1678, and 2186.

== History ==
The manuscript was brought from the East to Paris.

The manuscript was added to the list of New Testament manuscripts by Johann Martin Augustin Scholz. It was examined by Martin (p. 122). Gregory saw the manuscript in 1885.

The manuscript currently is housed at the Bibliothèque nationale de France (Gr. 221), at Paris.

== See also ==
- List of New Testament minuscules
- Biblical manuscript
- Textual criticism
