= Uncial 0227 =

- New Testament manuscript
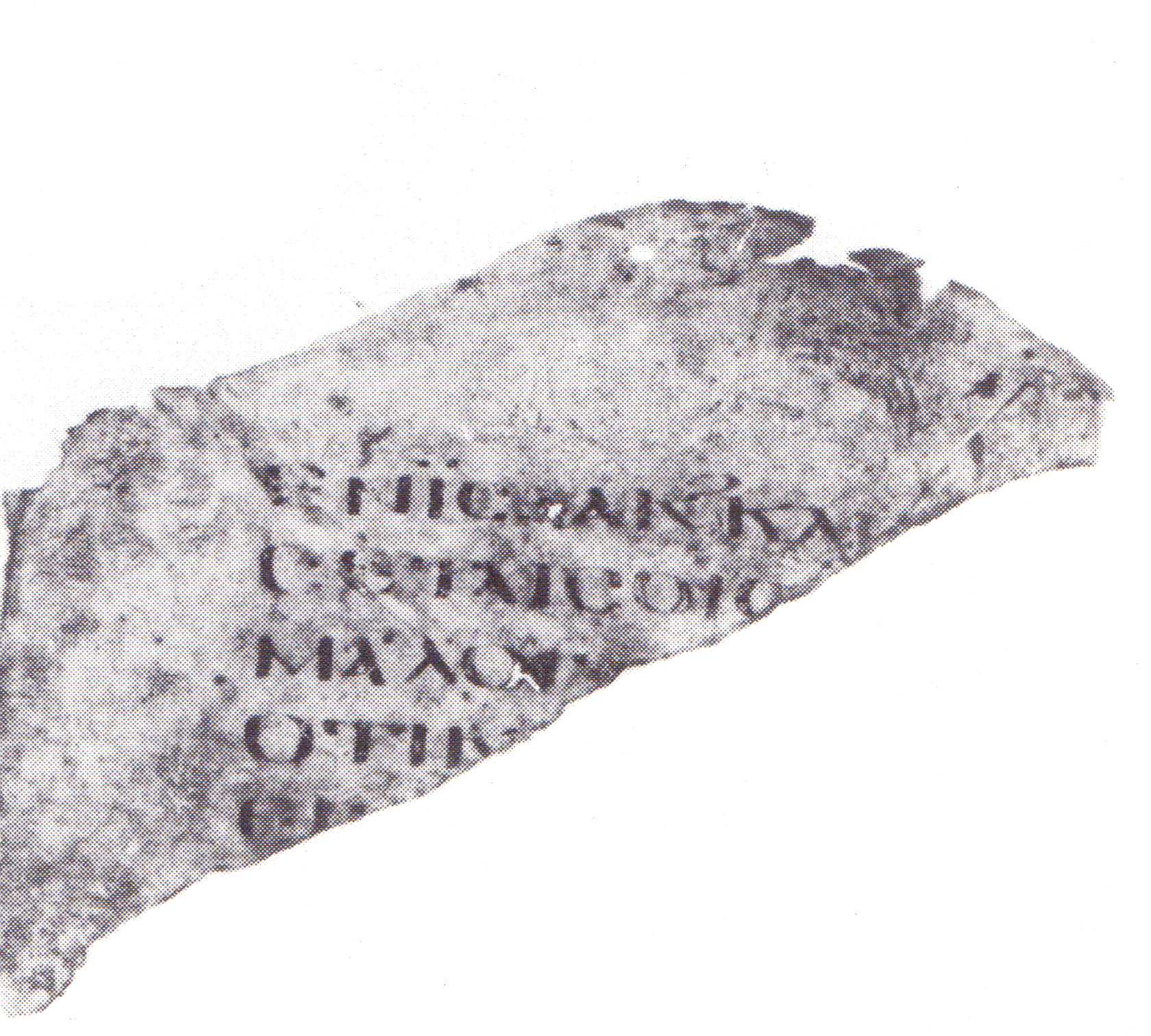
- Text: Hebrews 11:18-19,29
- Date: 5th-century
- Script: Greek
- Now at: Austrian National Library
- Size: 21 x 17 cm
- Type: mixed
- Category: III

Uncial 0227 (in the Gregory-Aland numbering), is a Greek uncial manuscript of the New Testament. The manuscript paleographically had been assigned to the 5th-century. It contains a small parts of the Epistle to the Hebrews (11:18-19,29), on one parchment leaf (21 cm by 17 cm). It is written in two columns per page, 23 lines per page.

The Greek text of this codex is mixed. Aland placed it in Category III.

Currently it is dated by the INTF to the 5th century.

Guglielmo Cavallo published a facsimile of the codex in 1967.

The manuscript was added to the list of the New Testament manuscripts by Kurt Aland in 1953.

The codex is currently housed at the Austrian National Library, in Vienna, with the shelf number Pap. G. 26055.

== See also ==
- List of New Testament uncials
- Textual criticism
