= Minuscule 378 =

- New Testament manuscript
- Text: Acts, Cath., Paul
- Date: 13th century
- Script: Greek
- Now at: Bodleian Library
- Size: 23 cm by 15 cm
- Type: Byzantine text-type
- Category: III, V
- Note: marginalia

Minuscule 378 (in the Gregory-Aland numbering), α 258 (Soden), is a Greek minuscule manuscript of the New Testament, on parchment. Palaeographically it has been assigned to the 13th century. Formerly it was labelled by 56^{a}, 227^{p}. It has some marginalia.

== Description ==
The codex contains the text of the Acts of the Apostles, Catholic epistles, and Pauline epistles on 221 parchment leaves (23 cm by 15 cm) with one lacuna (Acts 10:15-36). The text is written in one column per page, in 26-31 lines per page.

It contains Prolegomena, tables of the κεφαλαια (tables of contents) before each sacred book, numbers of the κεφαλαια (chapters) at the margin, lectionary markings at the margin, synaxaria, subscriptions at the end of each book, and numbers of stichoi.

== Text ==
The Greek text of the codex is a representative of the Byzantine text-type (except Catholic epistles). Aland placed it in Category V (except Catholic epistles). The text of the Catholic epistles has higher value, Aland placed it in III Category.

== History ==
The manuscript once belonged to John Metelli. The manuscript was added to the list of New Testament manuscripts by Scholz (1794-1852). C. R. Gregory saw it in 1886.

The manuscript was added to the list of the New Testament manuscripts by Scholz (1794-1852).

Formerly it was labelled by 56^{a}, 227^{p}. In 1908 Gregory gave the number 378 to it.

The manuscript is currently housed at the Bodleian Library (MS. E. D. Clarke 4) in Oxford.

== See also ==
- List of New Testament minuscules
- Biblical manuscript
- Textual criticism
