= Uncial 0165 =

- New Testament manuscript
- Text: Acts 3:24-4:13,17-20
- Date: 5th century
- Script: Greek
- Found: 1909
- Now at: Berlin State Museums
- Size: 19 x 16.5 cm
- Type: mixed
- Category: III
- Note: occasional agreement with D

Uncial 0165 (in the Gregory-Aland numbering), is a Greek uncial manuscript of the New Testament, dated paleographically to the 5th century.

== Description ==
The codex contains a small part of the Acts of the Apostles 3:24-4:13,17-20, on one parchment leaf (19 cm by 16.5 cm). It is written in two columns per page, 32 lines per page, 18-19 letters per line, in very small uncial letters. It has some breathings and accents.

== Text ==
Acts 3:24-26

[και των κα]θεξης
[οσοι ...]ναγγει
[λαν τας ημ]ερας ταυτας
[υμεις εστ]ε οι υιοι τω
[πρωφητων]και της δια
[θ]ηκη[σης]ησ διεθετο
προς τους πατερας ημω
[λ]εγων προς Αβρααμ και
τω σπερματι σου ενευλο
[γηθ]ησονται πασαι αι πα
τ[ριαι] της γης υμιν πρωτο
α[να]στησας ο θς τον παιδα
α[υτ]ου απεστειλεν αυτο

Acts 3:26-4:7

[ευλογο]θντας υμα[ς εν τω]
[αποστρεφειν εκαστον]
[απο των] πονηριων υμον
[λαλ]ουντων δε αυτων
[π]ρος τον λαον επεστη
[ς]αν αυτοι σοι ιερεις και ο
[στ]ρατηγος του ιερου και
[ου] σαδδουκαιοι διαπονου
μενοι δια το διδ[ασκ]ειν
[αυ]τους τον [λ]αον και κατ
[αγγε]λλει νεν Ιυ την ανα
[στ]ασιν των νεκρων και
[ε]πεβαλον αυτοις τας
χειρας και εθεντο ιες τη
[ρη]σιν την επαυριον ην

The Greek text of this codex is mixed with some the Western text-type element. It occasional agrees with Codex Bezae (e.g. επαυριον in 4:3). Aland placed it in Category III.

== History ==
Currently it is dated by the INTF to the 5th century.

The manuscript was added to the list of New Testament manuscripts by C. R. Gregory in 1909.

The codex currently is housed at the Berlin State Museums (P. 13271) in Berlin.

== See also ==
- List of New Testament uncials
- Textual criticism
