= Uncial 0261 =

- New Testament manuscript
- Text: Galatians 1:9-12,19-22; 4:25-31
- Date: 5th century
- Script: Greek
- Now at: Berlin State Museums
- Size: 20 x 15 cm
- Type: mixed
- Category: III

Uncial 0261 (in the Gregory-Aland numbering), is a Greek uncial manuscript of the New Testament. Palaeographically it has been assigned to the 5th century. The manuscript has survived in a very fragmentary condition.

== Description ==
The codex contains some parts of the Epistle to the Galatians 1:9-12,19-22; 4:25-31, on 2 parchment leaves (20 cm by 15 cm). The text is written in two columns per page, 25 lines per page, in uncial letters.

Currently it is dated by the INTF to the 5th century.

== Text ==
The text-type of this codex is mixed. Aland placed it in Category III.

== Location ==
Currently the codex is housed at the Berlin State Museums (P. 6791, 6792, 14043) in Berlin.

== See also ==
- List of New Testament uncials
- Textual criticism
