= Uncial 0231 =

Greek uncial manuscript of the New Testament

- New Testament manuscript
- Text: Matthew 26:75-27:1,3-4
- Date: 4th century
- Script: Greek
- Now at: Ashmolean Museum
- Size: 15 x 11.5 cm
- Type: mixed
- Category: III

Uncial 0231 (in the Gregory-Aland numbering), is a Greek uncial manuscript of the New Testament. The manuscript palaeographically has been assigned to the 4th century.

== Description ==
It contains a small parts of the Gospel of Matthew (26:75-27:1,3-4), on 1 parchment leaf (15 cm by 11.5 cm). The text is written in two columns per page, 15 lines per page.

The Greek text of this codex is mixed. Aland placed it in Category III.

It was found in Antinoopolis (modern El-Sheikh Ibada).

Currently it is dated by the INTF to the 4th century.

It was examined by G. R. Roberts in 1950. Guglielmo Cavallo published its facsimile.

The manuscript was added to the list of the New Testament manuscripts by Kurt Aland in 1953.

The codex is housed at the Ashmolean Museum (P. Ant. 11), in Oxford.

== See also ==
- List of New Testament uncials
- Textual criticism
