= Uncial 0143 =

- New Testament manuscript
- Text: Gospel of Mark 8 †
- Date: 6th century
- Script: Greek
- Now at: Bodleian Library
- Size: 14.5 x 6 cm
- Type: mixed
- Category: III

Uncial 0143 (in the Gregory-Aland numbering), ε 08 (Soden), is a Greek uncial manuscript of the New Testament, dated paleographically to the 6th century.

== Description ==
The codex contains a small part of Gospel of Mark 8:17-18,27-28 on one parchment leaf (14.5 cm by 6 cm). The text is written in two columns per page, 24 lines per page, in small uncial letters.

The Greek text of this codex is a representative of the mixed text-types. Aland placed it in Category III.

Currently it is dated by the INTF to the 6th century.

It is currently housed at the Bodleian Library, Gr. bibl. E, 5 (P) in Oxford.

== See also ==
- List of New Testament uncials
- Textual criticism
