= Uncial 0160 =

- New Testament manuscript
- Text: Matthew 26:25-26,34-36
- Date: 4th / 5th century
- Script: Greek
- Now at: Berlin State Museums
- Size: 9.1 x 6.5 cm
- Type: mixed
- Category: III

Uncial 0160 (in the Gregory-Aland numbering), ε 018 (von Soden), is a Greek uncial manuscript of the New Testament, dated paleographically to the 4th century (or 5th).

== Description ==
The codex contains a small part of the Gospel of Matthew 26:25-26,34-36, on one parchment leaf (9.1 cm by 6.5 cm). It is written in two columns per page, 24 lines per page, in uncial letters.

The Greek text of this codex is mixed. Aland placed it in Category III.

== History ==
Currently it is dated by the INTF to the 4th or 5th century.

The text of the codex was published by Gebhart.

The codex currently is housed at the Berlin State Museums, P. 9961 in Berlin.

== See also ==
- List of New Testament uncials
- Textual criticism
