= Uncial 0148 =

- New Testament manuscript
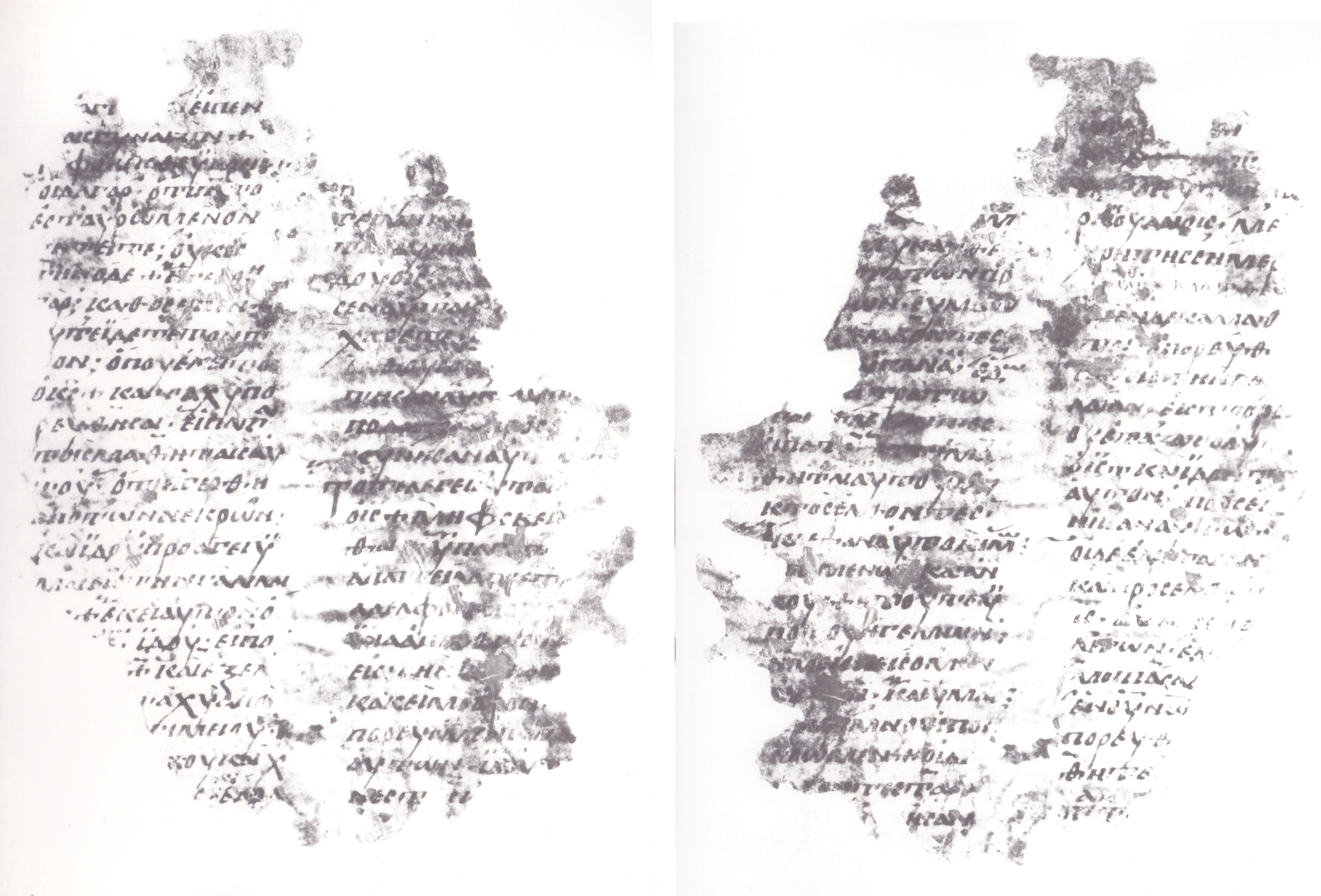
- Text: Gospel of Matthew 6:71-7:46
- Date: 8th-century
- Script: Greek
- Now at: Austrian National Library
- Size: 21.5 x 16.5 cm
- Type: mixed
- Category: III

Uncial 0148 (in the Gregory-Aland numbering), ε 51 (Soden), is a Greek uncial manuscript of the New Testament. It is dated paleographically to the 8th-century.

== Description ==
The codex contains a small part of the Gospel of Matthew 28:5-19, on one parchment leaf (21.5 cm by 16.5 cm). The text is written in two columns per page, 24 lines per page, in large uncial letters.

The Greek text of this codex is mixed. Aland placed it in Category III.

Currently it is dated by the INTF to the 8th-century.

The codex currently is located at the Österreichische Nationalbibliothek (Suppl. Gr. 106), in Vienna.

== See also ==
- List of New Testament uncials
- Textual criticism
