= Uncial 0268 =

- New Testament manuscript
- Text: John 1:30-33
- Date: 7th century
- Script: Greek
- Now at: Berlin State Museums
- Size: 11 x 8 cm
- Type: mixed
- Category: III

Uncial 0268 (in the Gregory-Aland numbering), is a Greek uncial manuscript of the New Testament. Palaeographically it has been assigned to the 7th century.

== Description ==
The codex contains two small parts of the Gospel of John 1:30-33, on one parchment leaf (11 cm by 8 cm). The text is written in one column per page, 10 lines per page, in uncial letters.

Currently it is dated by the INTF to the 7th century.

== Text ==
The Greek text of this codex is too brief to determine its textual character. Aland did not placed it in any of Categories of New Testament manuscripts.

== Location ==
Currently the codex is housed at the Berlin State Museums (P. 6790) in Berlin.

== See also ==
- List of New Testament uncials
- Textual criticism
