= Uncial 0103 =

- New Testament manuscript
- Text: Mark 13:34-14:25
- Date: 7th-century
- Script: Greek
- Now at: Bibliothèque nationale de France
- Size: 22.5 x 16.5 cm
- Type: Byzantine text-type
- Category: V

Uncial 0103 (in the Gregory-Aland numbering), ε 43 (Soden), is a Greek uncial manuscript of the New Testament. It is dated paleographically to the 7th-century.

== Description ==
The codex contains a small part of the Gospel of Mark 13:34-14:25 on two parchment leaves (22.5 by 16.5 cm). The text is written in two columns per page, 30 lines per page, 9 and more letters in line. The uncial letters are round and square, they are small.

The text is divided according to the κεφαλαια (chapters), whose numbers are given at the margin, and the τιτλοι (titles of chapters) at the top of the pages. There is also a division according to the smaller Ammonian Sections, with references to the Eusebian Canons (written below Ammonian Section numbers). It contains lectionary markings, and music notes.

It is a palimpsest, the upper text contains a homily in Hebrew.

The Greek text of this codex is a representative of the Byzantine text-type. Aland placed it in Category V.

Currently it is dated by the INTF to the 7th-century.

The codex currently is located in the Bibliothèque nationale de France (Suppl. Gr. 726, ff. 6-7), at Paris.

== See also ==
- List of New Testament uncials
- Textual criticism
