= Uncial 0135 =

- New Testament manuscript
- Text: Matthew †; Mark †; Luke †
- Date: 9th century
- Script: Greek
- Now at: Biblioteca Ambrosiana
- Size: 14.3 x 12.5 cm
- Type: Byzantine text-type
- Category: V

Uncial 0135 (in the Gregory-Aland numbering), ε 85 (Soden), is a Greek uncial manuscript of the New Testament, dated paleographically to the 9th century.

== Description ==
The codex contains a fragments of the Matthew, Mark, and Luke, on 16 parchment leaves (14.3 cm by 12.5 cm). It is written in two columns per page, 20 lines per page, in uncial letters. It has breathings and accents.

The text is divided according to the κεφαλαια (chapters) whose numbers are given at the margin, with their τιτλοι (titles) at the top of the pages. There is also another division according to the smaller Ammonian Sections, but without references to the Eusebian Canons. It contains lectionary markings at the margin.

Currently it is dated by the INTF to the 9th century.

It is a palimpsest, the upper text was overwritten in 1415, it contains Erotemata grammaticalia (Ἐρωτήματα Γραμματικά) written by Manuel Moschopoulos.

Contents
Gospel of Matthew 25:35-26:2; 27:3-17;
Mark 1:12-24; 2:26-3:10;
Luke 1:24-37; 1:68-2:4; 4:28-40; 6:22-35; 8:22-30; 9:42-53; 17:2-14; 18:7-9.13-19; 22:11-25.52-66; 23:35-49(?); 24:32-46,

Text

The Greek text of this codex is a representative of the Byzantine text-type. Kurt Aland placed it in Category V.

Location

The codex is located now at the Biblioteca Ambrosiana (Q. 6 sup., fol. 15. 18. 31. 34. 47. 50. 62. 65) in Milan.

History

There is inscription on folio 4 verso "Ex dono Io. Baptistae Portae Neapoli V. Clarissimi". Gregory saw the manuscript in 1886.

== See also ==
- List of New Testament uncials
- Textual criticism
