= Uncial 0146 =

- New Testament manuscript
- Text: Mark 10:37–45
- Date: 8th century
- Script: Greek
- Now at: Qubbat al-Khazna
- Size: 27 x 21 cm
- Type: mixed
- Category: III

Uncial 0146 (in the Gregory-Aland numbering), ε 037 (Soden), is a Greek uncial manuscript of the New Testament, dated palaeographically to the 8th century.

== Description ==
The codex contains a small part of the Gospel of Mark 10:37–45, on one parchment leaf (27 cm by 21 cm). It is written in two columns per page, 20 lines per page, in uncial letters.

The Greek text of this codex is mixed. Kurt Aland placed it in Category III.

It is dated by the Institute for New Testament Textual Research to the 8th century.

The codex used to be held in Qubbat al-Khazna in Damascus. The present location of the codex is unknown. The manuscript is not accessible.

== See also ==
- List of New Testament uncials
- Biblical manuscript
- Textual criticism
