= Uncial 0105 =

- New Testament manuscript
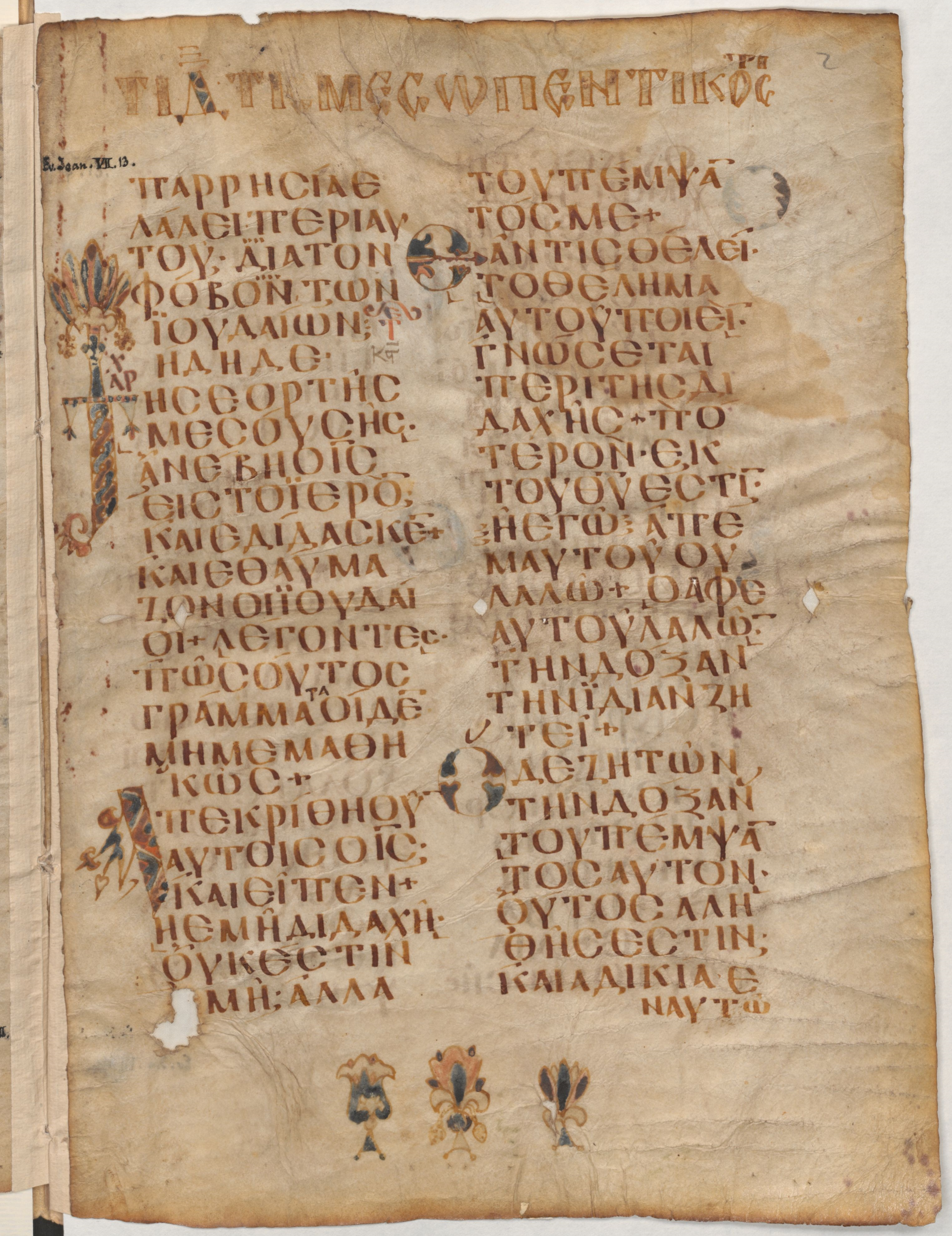
- Folio 2 recto
- Text: Gospel of John 6:71-7:46
- Date: 10th-century
- Script: Greek
- Now at: Austrian National Library
- Size: 32 x 24 cm
- Type: mixed
- Category: III

Uncial 0105 (in the Gregory-Aland numbering), ε 45 (Soden), is a Greek uncial manuscript of the New Testament. It is dated paleographically to the 10th-century. Formerly it was labelled by W^{n}.

== Description ==
The codex contains a small part of the Gospel of John 6:71-7:46, on four parchment leaves (32 by 24 cm). The text is written in two columns per page (size of column is 22.8 by 7.5 cm), 24 lines per page, in large uncial letters. The ink is brown. It contains Ammonian Sections, Eusebian Canons, lectionary markings at the margin, and music notes. It has some errors of itacism. It has breathings and accents, but irregular.

The Greek text of this codex is mixed, with a strong element of the Byzantine text-type. Aland placed it in Category III.

== History ==
Gregory dated it to the 7th-century. Currently it is dated by the INTF to the 10th-century.

According to C. R. Gregory it was acquired from Eastern Asia-Minor or Armenia. Gregory gave full text of the codex.

The codex is located at the Austrian National Library, (Suppl. Gr. 121), in Vienna.

== See also ==
- List of New Testament uncials
- Textual criticism
