= Uncial 0198 =

- New Testament manuscript
- Text: Colossians 3:15-16,20-21
- Date: 6th-century
- Script: Greek
- Now at: British Library
- Size: 11 x 7.5 cm
- Type: mixed
- Category: III

Uncial 0198 (in the Gregory-Aland numbering), is a Greek uncial manuscript of the New Testament, dated paleographically to the 6th century.

== Description ==
The codex contains a small parts of the Epistle to the Colossians 3:15-16,20-21, on one parchment leaf (11 cm by 7.5 cm). The text is written in one column per page, 7 lines per page, in very large uncial letters.

The Greek text of this codex is mixed. Aland placed it in Category III.

Currently it is dated by the INTF to the 6th century.

The codex currently is housed at the British Library (Pap. 459) in London.

== See also ==
- List of New Testament uncials
- Textual criticism
