= Categories of New Testament manuscripts =

New Testament manuscripts in Greek can be categorized into five theoretical groups, according to a schema introduced in 1981 by Kurt and Barbara Aland in The Text of the New Testament. The categories are based on how each manuscript relates to the various theorized text-types. Generally speaking, earlier Alexandrian manuscripts are category I, while later Byzantine manuscripts are category V. Aland's method involved considering 1000 passages where the Byzantine text differs from non-Byzantine text. The Alands did not select their 1000 readings from all of the NT books; for example, none were drawn from Matthew and Luke.

== Description of categories ==
The Alands' categories do not simply correspond to the text-types; all they do is demonstrate the 'Byzantine-ness' of a particular text; that is, how much it is similar to the Byzantine text-type, from least (Category I) to most similar (Category V). Category V can be equated with the Byzantine text-type, but the other categories are not necessarily representative of a text-type. Even though most texts in Category I agree with the Alexandrian text-type, they are not necessarily Alexandrian themselves; they are just very non-Byzantine.

The Alands introduced the following categories (Aland & Aland category description according to the 1989 English translation, p. 106, between quotation marks):

- Category I: "Manuscripts of a very special quality which should always be considered in establishing the original text." This category includes almost all manuscripts before the 4th century. These manuscripts have almost no Byzantine influence, and often agree with the Alexandrian text-type, but are not necessarily Alexandrian themselves (for example 𝔓^{45}, 𝔓^{46}, Codex Vaticanus (B), and minuscule 1739). Some 4th-century and earlier papyri and uncials are in this category, as are manuscripts of the Alexandrian text-type. The Alands say the manuscripts in this category are important when considering textual problems, and in their opinion "presumably [represent] the original text".
- Category II: "Manuscripts of a special quality, but distinguished from manuscripts of Category I by the presence of alien influences." The manuscripts in this category are similar to category I manuscripts, and are important in textual consideration of the autograph. However, the texts usually contain some alien influences, such as those found in the Byzantine text-type. Egyptian texts fall in this category.
- Category III: "Manuscripts of a distinctive character with an independent text... particularly important for the history of the text." The manuscripts in category III are important when discussing the history of the textual traditions and to a lesser degree for establishing the original text. The manuscripts usually contain independent readings, and have a distinctive character. ƒ^{1} and ƒ^{13} are examples of manuscript families that fall within this category. Manuscripts of this category usually present mixed or eclectic text-type.
- Category IV: "Manuscripts of the D text." Category IV contains the few manuscripts that follow the text of the Codex Bezae (D). These texts are of the Western text-type.
- Category V: "Manuscripts with a purely or predominantly Byzantine text." This category may be equated with the Byzantine text-type. Byzantine and mostly Byzantine texts fall under this category.
- Uncategorised: Some manuscripts studied by the Alands were not categorised, for example because they were too short to determine which group they belonged to, or fell somewhere in between. The unclassified manuscript could be representative of the Western text-type, the "Caesarean text-type" (a term proposed by certain scholars to denote a consistent pattern of variant readings of the four Gospels), or anything else.

== Distribution of Greek manuscripts by century and category ==
The following table is derived from Kurt & Barbara Aland's The Text of the New Testament. (Note: Manuscripts utilized since the publication of NA26 in 1979 (such as 𝔓^{104} and 𝔓^{115}) have been inserted into their applicable table cells.)

Century and approximate year (AD)	I	II	III	IV	V
2nd (c. 150)	𝔓^{52}, 𝔓^{90}, 𝔓^{104}				
2nd / 3rd (c. 200)	𝔓^{32}, 𝔓^{46}, 𝔓^{64+67}, 𝔓^{66}, 𝔓^{77}, 0189				
3rd (c. 250)	𝔓^{1}, 𝔓^{4}, 𝔓^{5}, 𝔓^{9}, 𝔓^{12}, 𝔓^{15}, 𝔓^{20}, 𝔓^{22}, 𝔓^{23}, 𝔓^{27}, 𝔓^{28}, 𝔓^{29}, 𝔓^{30}, 𝔓^{39}, 𝔓^{40}, 𝔓^{45}, 𝔓^{47}, 𝔓^{49}, 𝔓^{53}, 𝔓^{65}, 𝔓^{70}, 𝔓^{75}, 𝔓^{80}, 𝔓^{87}, 0220		0212	𝔓^{48}, 𝔓^{69}	
3rd / 4th (c. 300)	𝔓^{13}, 𝔓^{16}, 𝔓^{18}, 𝔓^{37}, 𝔓^{72}, 𝔓^{78}, 𝔓^{115}, 0162			𝔓^{38}, 0171	
4th (c. 350)	𝔓^{10}, 𝔓^{24}, 𝔓^{35}, 01, 03	𝔓^{6}, 𝔓^{8}, 𝔓^{17}, 𝔓^{62}, 𝔓^{71}, 𝔓^{81}, 𝔓^{86}, 0185	𝔓^{88}, 058 (?), 0169, 0188, 0206, 0207, 0221, 0228, 0231, 0242		
4th / 5th (c. 400)	057	𝔓^{19}, 𝔓^{51}, 𝔓^{57}, 𝔓^{82}, 𝔓^{85}, 0181, 0270	𝔓^{21}, 𝔓^{50}, 059, 0160, 0176, 0214, 0219		
5th (c. 450)	02 (except Gospels), 0254	𝔓^{14}, 04, 016, 029, 048, 077, 0172, 0173, 0175, 0201, 0240, 0244, 0274	02 (Gospels), 032, 062, 068, 069, 0163, 0165 (?), 0166, 0182, 0216, 0217, 0218, 0226, 0227, 0236, 0252, 0261	05	026, 061
5th / 6th (c. 500)		𝔓^{56}, 071, 076, 088, 0232, 0247	𝔓^{54}, 𝔓^{63}, 072, 0170, 0186, 0213		
6th (c. 550)		𝔓^{33+58}, 06, 08, 073, 081, 085, 087, 089, 091, 093 (1 Peter), 094, 0184, 0223, 0225, 0245	𝔓^{2}, 𝔓^{36}, 𝔓^{76}, 𝔓^{83}, 𝔓^{84}, 06, 015, 035, 040, 060, 066, 067, 070, 078, 079, 082, 086, 0143, 0147, 0159, 0187, 0198, 0208, 0222, 0237, 0241, 0251, 0260, 0266		022, 023, 024, 027, 042, 043, 064, 065, 093 (Acts), 0246, 0253, 0265 (?)
6th / 7th (c. 600)	𝔓^{26}	𝔓^{43}, 𝔓^{44}, 𝔓^{55}, 083	𝔓^{3}, 0164, 0199		
7th (c. 650)	𝔓^{74}, 098	𝔓^{11}, 𝔓^{31}, 𝔓^{34}, 𝔓^{79}, 0102, 0108, 0111, 0204, 0275	𝔓^{59}, 𝔓^{68}, 096, 097, 099, 0106, 0107, 0109, 0145, 0167, 0183, 0200, 0209, 0210, 0239, 0259, 0262		𝔓^{73}, 0103, 0104, 0211
7th / 8th (c. 700)		𝔓^{42}, 𝔓^{61}	𝔓^{60}		
8th (c. 750)		019, 0101, 0114, 0156, 0205, 0234	𝔓^{41}, 095, 0126, 0127, 0146, 0148, 0161, 0229, 0233, 0238, 0250, 0256		07, 047, 054 (?), 0116, 0134
8th / 9th (c. 800)		044 (Catholic epistles)	044 (except Catholic epistles)		
9th (c. 850)	33 (except Gospels)	010, 038, 0155, 0271, 33 (Gospels), 892, 2464	012, 025 (except Acts, Rev), 037, 050, 0122, 0128, 0130, 0131, 0132, 0150, 0269, 565		09, 011, 013, 014, 017, 018, 020, 021, 025 (Acts, Rev), 030, 031, 034, 039, 041, 045, 049, 053 (?), 063, 0120, 0133, 0135, 0136 (?), 0151, 0197, 0248, 0255, 0257, 0272, 0273 (?), 461
9th / 10th (c. 900)		1841	0115, 1424 (Mark)		1424 (except Mark), 1841
10th (c. 950)	1739 (Catholic epistles, Paul)	0177, 0243 (?), 1739 (Acts), 1891, 2329	051, 075, 0105, 0121a, 0121b, 0140, 0141, 0249, 307, 1582, 1836, 1845, 1874, 1875, 1912, 2110, 2193, 2351		028, 033, 036, 046, 052, 056, 0142, 1874, 1891
11th (c. 1050)	1175, 1243, 2344	81, 323, 945, 1006, 1854, 1962, 2298	28, 104, 181, 323, 398, 424, 431, 436, 451, 459, 623, 700, 788, 1243, 1448, 1505, 1838, 1846, 1908, 2138, 2147, 2298, 2344, 2596 (?)		103, 104, 181 (Rev), 398, 431, 451, 459, 945, 1006, 1448, 1505, 1846, 1854, 2138, 2147, 2298
11th / 12th (c. 1100)		256, 1735	1735, 1910		256
12th (c. 1150)	1241 (Catholic epistles)	36, 1611, 2050, 2127	1 (Gospels), 36, 88, 94 (?), 157, 326, 330, 346, 378, 543, 610, 826, 828, 917, 983, 1071, 1241 (Gospels, Acts, Paul), 1319, 1359, 1542b, 1611, 1718, 1942, 2030, 2412, 2541, 2744		1 (except Gospels), 180, 189, 330, 378, 610, 911, 917, 1010, 1241, 1319, 1359, 1542b (?), 2127, 2541
12th / 13th (c. 1200)			1573		1573 (?)
13th (c. 1250)	2053, 2062	442, 579, 1292, 1852	6 (Catholic epistles, Paul), 13, 94, 180, 206, 218 (epistles), 263, 365, 441, 614, 720, 915, 1398, 1563, 1641, 1852, 2374, 2492, 2516, 2542, 2718 (?)		6 (Gospels, Acts), 94 (?), 180, 206, 218 (except epistles), 263, 365, 597, 720, 1251 (?), 1292, 1398, 1642, 1852, 2374, 2400, 2492 (?), 2516
13th / 14th (c. 1300)			1342		
14th (c. 1350)	~~2427~~: Now determined to be a forgery	1067, 1409, 1506, 1881	5, 209, 254, 429 (except Paul), 453, 621, 629, 630, 1523, 1534, 1678 (?), 1842, 1877, 2005, 2197, 2200, 2377		5 (?), 189, 209, 254, 429 (Paul), 1067, 1409, 1506, 1523, 1524, 1877, 2200
14th / 15th (c. 1400)			2495		
15th (c. 1450)		322	69, 205, 322, 467, 642, 1751, 1844, 1959, 2523, 2652		69, 181, 205, 429 (Rev.), 467, 642, 886, 2523, 2623, 2652 (?)
16th (c. 1500)			61 (epistles, Rev), 522, 918, 1704, 1884		61 (Gospels, Acts), 522, 918, 1704
16th / 17th and later (c. 1550–)			849, 2544 (Paul)		2544 (except Paul)

== Number of manuscripts by century and category ==
Century	Category I	Category II	Category III	Category IV	Category V
II	3				
II/III	6				
III	25		1	2	
III/IV	8			2	
IV	5	8	10		
IV/V	1	7	7		
V	2	16	19	1	2
V/VI		6	6		
VI		15	31		12
VI/VII	1	4	3		
VII	2	8	17		4
VII/VIII		2	1		
VIII		6	12		5
VIII/IX		1	1		
IX	3	7	12		5
IX/X		1	2		2
X	1	5	18		10
XI	3	7	24		16
XI/XII		2	2		1
XII	1	5	24		16
XII/XIII			1		1
XIII	2	4	21		18
XIII/XIV			1		
XIV	1	4	17		12
XIV/XV			1		
XV		1	11		9
XVI			5		4
XVI/XVII			2		1

== Limitations ==
This system of classification would seem to prefer manuscripts which coincide more or less with the critical text of the Nestle-Aland and UBS Greek New Testaments, of which there are many supposedly Alexandrian manuscripts in Category I. Some manuscripts are placed in Category V because they are considered too "brief" to classify. The Alands consider Uncial 055 unclassifiable because it is a commentary, and not exactly an "Uncial" manuscript. Accordingly 𝔓^{7}, 𝔓^{89}, Uncial 080, Uncial 0100, Uncial 0118, 0174, 0230, 0263, 0264, 0267, 0268 are considered by the Alands to be too brief to classify. Uncial 0144 and 0196 are not accessible. The Alands do not classify 𝔓^{25}, stating this is due to the Diatessaric character of text (i.e. the four Gospels combined into a single narrative).

𝔓^{5} was classified to Category I, but it is not a representative of the Alexandrian text-type. According to biblical scholar Philip Comfort it is "a good example of what Kurt and Barbara Aland call "normal" (i.e. a relatively accurate text manifesting a normal amount of error and idiosyncrasy).

The Alands references are one of the most widely used references for New Testament textual criticism in theological studies today along with the UBS and continues to receive regular updates as more manuscripts are found and become available for study. Published apparatus are constrained by limitations of space. Furthermore, updates do not happen in real time although efforts have made rapid progress in bringing the data online allowing for a more real-time access to research and discussion in ways no other text from antiquity has ever been done with the scale and scope of evidentiary materials. Originally, Waltz stated:

As a classification scheme, [Aland & Aland's] attempt was at once a success and a failure. A success, in that it has conveniently gathered data about how Byzantine the various manuscripts are. A failure, because it has not been widely adopted, and in any case does not succeed in moving beyond Byzantine/non-Byzantine classification.

== See also ==
- List of New Testament papyri
- List of New Testament uncials
- List of New Testament minuscules
- List of New Testament lectionaries
- Textual variants in the New Testament
- Early Greek New Testament manuscripts
