= Minuscule 886 =

- New Testament manuscript
- Name: Cod. Regin. grec. 6
- Text: New Testament †
- Date: 15th century
- Script: Greek
- Now at: Vatican Library
- Size: 34.6 cm by 24.5 cm
- Type: Byzantine
- Category: V

Minuscule 886 (in the Gregory-Aland numbering), is a 15th-century Greek minuscule manuscript of the New Testament on paper, with a commentary. The manuscript has not survived in complete condition.

== Description ==
The codex contains the text of the New Testament (except Catholic epistles), with a commentary, on 336 paper leaves (size 34.6 cm by 24.5 cm). The text is written in one column per page, 59 lines per page.

The commentary is of authorship of Nicetas of Naupactus in the Gospels, of Theophylact in the Acts of the Apostles and Pauline epistles. The Apocalypse has a commentary of an anonymous writer.

It contains the Eusebian Canon tables (before four Gospels), κεφαλαια lists before each biblical book.

== Text ==
Kurt and Barbara Aland gave the textual profile 209^{1}, 99^{2}, 2^{1/2}, 14^{s} in the Gospels, 15^{1}, 3^{2}, 3^{1/2}, 4^{s} in the Acts, and 171^{1}, 43^{2}, 9^{1/2}, 23^{s} in the Pauline epistles. On the basis of this profile Alands placed it in Category V. It means it is a representative of the Byzantine text-type.

It was not examined according to the Claremont Profile Method.

== History ==
The manuscript is dated by a colophon to the year 1454. Currently the manuscript is dated by the INTF to the 15th century.

It once belonged to Ignatius, metropolitan, then to Demetrius Leontari, then to Christian Baue in Berlin. The manuscript was described by Henry Stevenson. Gregory saw it in 1886. The text of the Apocalypse was collated by Herman C. Hoskier.

The manuscript was added to the list of New Testament manuscripts by Scrivener (698^{e}), Gregory (886^{e}).

Currently the manuscript is housed at the Vatican Library (Reg. gr. 6), in Rome.

== See also ==
- List of New Testament minuscules (1–1000)
- Biblical manuscript
- Textual criticism
