= Uncial 086 =

- New Testament manuscript
- Text: Gospel of John 1†; 3-4†
- Date: 6th century
- Script: Greek, Coptic diglot
- Now at: British Library
- Size: 27 x 23 cm
- Type: mixed
- Category: III

Uncial 086 (in the Gregory-Aland numbering), ε 35 (Soden), is a Greek — Coptic diglot, uncial codex of the New Testament, dated paleographically to the 6th century.

== Description ==
The codex contains two small parts of the Gospel of John 1:23-26; 3:5-4:23-35.45-49 on 13 parchment leaves (27 cm by 23 cm). The text is written in two columns per page, 20 and more lines per page.

It is a palimpsest, the upper text contains a Coptic tables and formulae.

The Greek text of this codex is a mixed type. Aland placed it in Category III.

Currently it is dated by the INTF to the 6th century.

The codex now is located at the British Library (Or. 5707) in London.

== See also ==
- List of New Testament uncials
- Coptic versions of the Bible
- Textual criticism
