= Uncial 0217 =

- New Testament manuscript
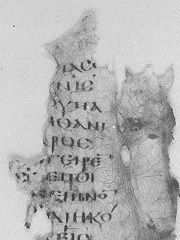
- Uncial 0217, John 11:57; 12:1
- Text: John 11:57-12:7
- Date: 5th century
- Script: Greek
- Now at: Austrian National Library
- Size: 13 x 9 cm
- Type: mixed
- Category: III

Uncial 0217 (in the Gregory-Aland numbering), is a Greek uncial manuscript of the New Testament, dated palaeographically to the 5th century.

== Description ==
The codex contains a small part of the Gospel of John (11:57-12:7), on 1 parchment leaf (13 cm by 9 cm). The text is written in two columns per page, 19 lines per page.

The Greek text of this codex is mixed. Aland placed it in Category III.

Currently it is dated by the INTF to the 5th century.

The manuscript was added to the list of the New Testament manuscripts by Kurt Aland in 1953.

The codex is located at the Austrian National Library, in Vienna, with the shelf number Pap. G. 39212.

== See also ==
- List of New Testament uncials
- Textual criticism
