= Minuscule 915 =

- New Testament manuscript
- Text: Acts, Cath, Paul †
- Date: 13th century
- Script: Greek
- Now at: El Escorial
- Size: 23.5 cm by 19 cm
- Type: ?
- Category: none

Minuscule 915 (in the Gregory-Aland numbering), α 382 (von Soden), is a 13th-century Greek minuscule manuscript of the New Testament on parchment. The manuscript has not survived in complete condition.

== Description ==
The codex contains the text of the Book of Acts, Catholic epistles and Pauline epistles, on 237 parchment leaves (size 23.5 cm by 19 cm).

The text is written in one column per page, and 25 lines per page.

It has a lacuna at the end. Some leaves of the codex were destroyed by fire.

It contains Menologion and lectionary markings at the margin for liturgical reading.

== Text ==
Kurt Aland the Greek text of the codex did not place in any Category. With Minuscule 88, it is one of only two monoglot Greek manuscripts known to deliberately place 1 Corinthians 14:34-35 at the end of the chapter, in conformity with the Western text-type.

== History ==
According to Scrivener and C. R. Gregory the manuscript was written in the 13th century. Currently the manuscript is dated by the INTF to the 13th century.

It was described by Montana, who sent description to Mr. Kelly.

The manuscript was added to the list of New Testament manuscripts by Scrivener (203^{a}) and Gregory (231^{a}). In 1908 Gregory gave the number 915 to it.

It is currently housed in the Biblioteca de El Escorial (T. III. 12) in Escurial.

== See also ==
- List of New Testament minuscules
- Biblical manuscript
- Textual criticism
