= Uncial 066 =

- New Testament manuscript
- Text: Acts 28
- Date: 6th-century
- Script: Greek
- Now at: Russian National Library
- Size: 25 x 20 cm
- Type: Western text-type
- Category: III

Uncial 066 (in the Gregory-Aland numbering), α 1000 (Soden), is a Greek uncial manuscript of the New Testament. Palaeographically it has been assigned to the 6th-century.

== Description ==
The codex contains a small part of the Acts 28:8-17, on one parchment leaf (25 cm by 20 cm). The text is written in two columns per page, 25 lines per page. It is a palimpsest. The upper text has a Georgian calendar.

The Greek text of this codex is a representative of the Western text-type, but it has some the Caesarean readings. Kurt Aland placed it in Category III.

Currently the manuscript is dated by the INTF to the 6th century.

Constantin von Tischendorf published its text.

It is currently housed at the Russian National Library (Suppl. Gr. 6, II, fol 4) in Saint Petersburg.

== See also ==
- List of New Testament uncials
- Textual criticism
