= Uncial 0264 =

- New Testament manuscript
- Text: John 8:19-20,23-24
- Date: 5th century
- Script: Greek
- Now at: Berlin State Museums
- Size: 15 x 12 cm
- Type: Unknown
- Category: None

Uncial 0264 (in the Gregory-Aland numbering), is a Greek uncial manuscript of the New Testament. Paleographically it has been assigned to the 5th century.

== Descriptions ==
The codex contains small parts of the Gospel of John 8:19-20,23-24, on one parchment leaf (15 cm by 12 cm). It has survived in a fragmentary condition. The text is written in one column per page, 18 lines per page, in uncial letters.

Currently it is dated by the INTF to the 5th century.

== Location ==
Currently the codex is housed at the Berlin State Museums (P. 14049) in Berlin.

== Text ==
The text-type of this codex is unknown, as the text is too brief to determine its textual character. Aland did not place it in any of Categories of New Testament manuscripts.

== See also ==
- List of New Testament uncials
- Textual criticism
