= Uncial 0213 =

- New Testament manuscript
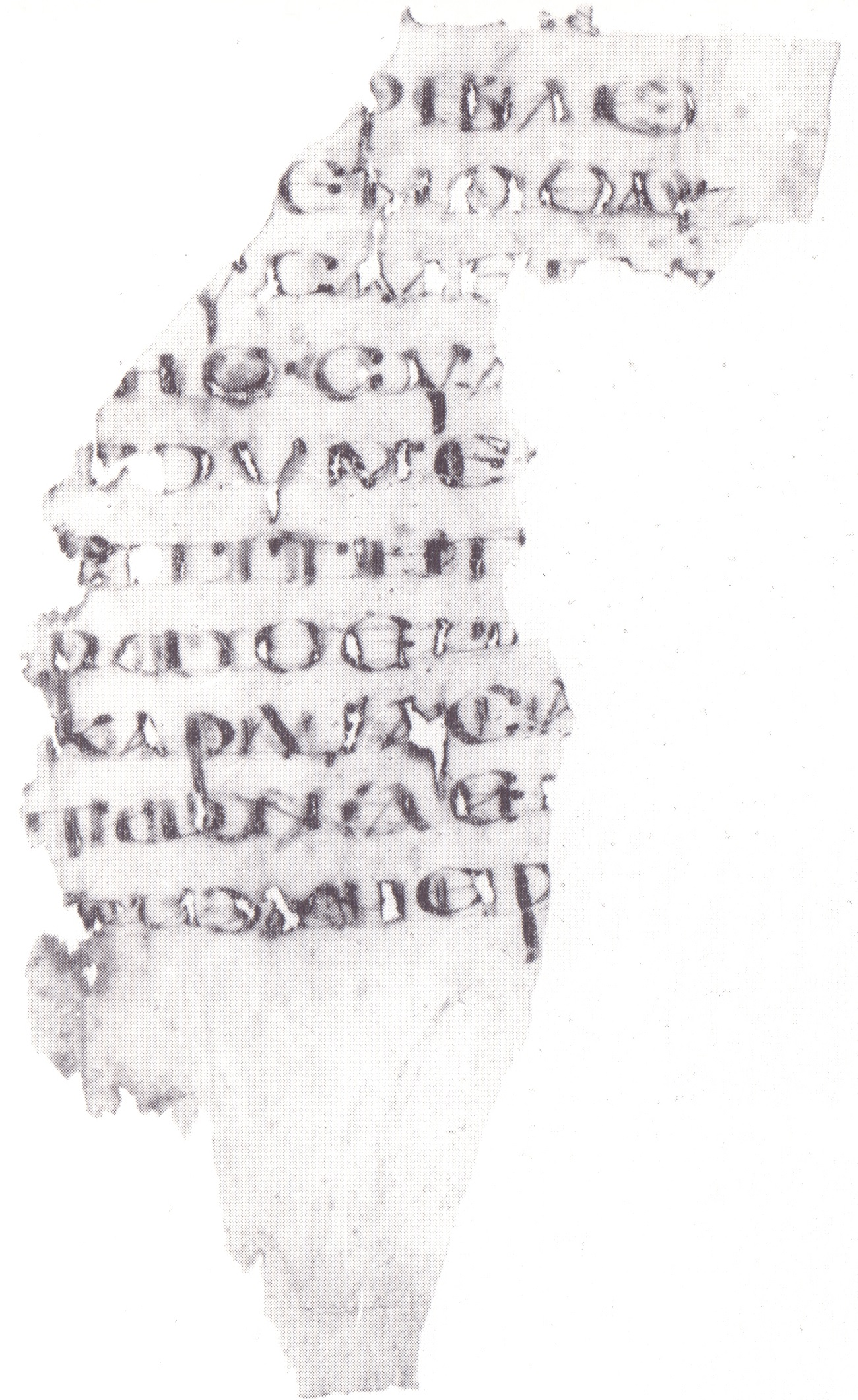
- Text: Mark 3:2-3; 3:4-5
- Date: 5th/6th century
- Script: Greek
- Found: unknown
- Now at: Papyrus Collection of the Austrian National Library
- Cite: P. Sanz, Griechische literarische Papyri christlicher Inhalte (Vienna: 1946)
- Size: 33 x 23 cm
- Type: mixed
- Category: III

Uncial 0213 (in the Gregory-Aland numbering) is a Greek uncial manuscript of the New Testament, dated palaeographically to the 5th or 6th century.

== Description ==
The codex contains a part of the Gospel of Mark (3:2-3; 4:4-5), on only 1 parchment leaf (33 cm by 23 cm). The text is written in two columns per page, 23 lines per page.

The Greek text of this codex is mixed. Aland placed it in Category III.

Currently it is dated by the INTF to the 5th or 6th century. Place of origin is unknown.

The manuscript was added to the list of the New Testament manuscripts by Kurt Aland in 1953.

The codex is located at the Papyrus Collection of the Austrian National Library in Vienna, with the shelf number Pap. G. 1384.

== See also ==
- List of New Testament uncials
- Textual criticism
