= Uncial 0226 =

- New Testament manuscript
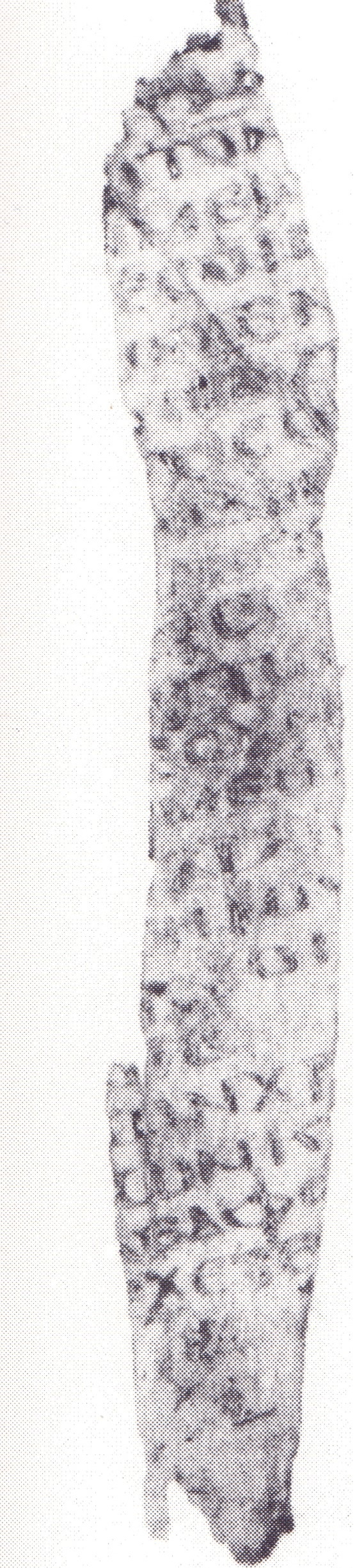
- Text: 1 Thessalonians 4:16-5:5
- Date: 5th century
- Script: Greek
- Now at: Austrian National Library
- Size: 17 x 12 cm
- Type: mixed
- Category: III

Uncial 0226 (in the Gregory-Aland numbering), is a Greek uncial manuscript of the New Testament. The manuscript paleographically had been assigned to the 5th century. It contains a small parts of the First Epistle to the Thessalonians (4:16-5:5), on one parchment leaf (17 cm by 12 cm). It is written in two columns per page, 25 lines per page.

== Text ==
The Greek text of this codex is mixed. Aland placed it in Category III.

Currently it is dated by the INTF to the 5th-century.

The text of the codex was published in 1946 by Peter Sanz.

Guglielmo Cavallo published a facsimile of the codex.

The manuscript was added to the list of the New Testament manuscripts by Kurt Aland in 1953.

== Location ==
The codex currently is housed at the Austrian National Library, in Vienna, with the shelf number Pap. G. 31489.

== See also ==
- 1 Thessalonians 4, 5
- List of New Testament uncials
- Textual criticism
