= Uncial 0242 =

- New Testament manuscript
- Text: Matthew 8:25-9:2; 13 †
- Date: 4th century
- Script: Greek
- Now at: Egyptian Museum
- Size: 23 cm by 20 cm
- Type: mixed
- Category: III

Uncial 0242 (in the Gregory-Aland numbering), is a Greek uncial manuscript of the New Testament. Paleographically it has been assigned to the 4th century.

== Description ==
The codex contains a small parts of the Gospel of Matthew 8:25-9:2; 13:32-38,40-46, on two parchment leaves (23 cm by 20 cm). The text is written in two columns per page, 25 lines per page, in uncial letters.

Currently it is dated by the INTF to the 4th century.

It was examined by Ramón Roca-Puig in 1959. The manuscript was added to the list of the New Testament manuscripts by Kurt Aland in 1963.

== Location ==
Currently the codex is housed at the Egyptian Museum (no. 71942) in Cairo.

== Text ==
The Greek text of this codex is mixed. Aland placed it in Category III.

== See also ==
- List of New Testament uncials
- Textual criticism
