= Uncial 060 =

- New Testament manuscript
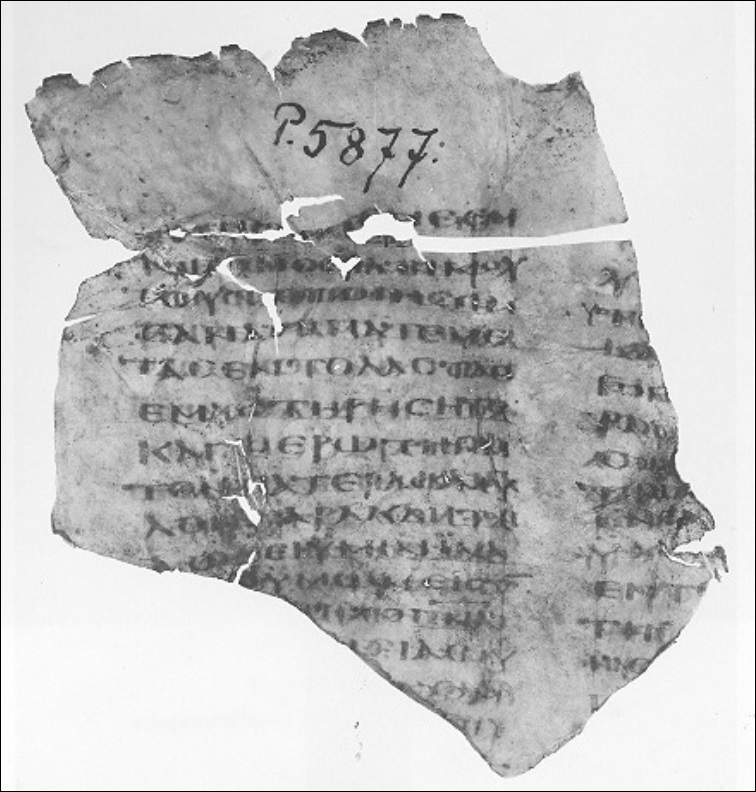
- The fragment containing John 14:14-17, 19-21
- Text: John 14 †
- Date: 6th century
- Script: Greek
- Now at: Berlin State Museums
- Size: 14 cm x 12 cm
- Type: mixed
- Category: III

Uncial 060 (in the Gregory-Aland numbering), ε 13 (Soden), is a Greek uncial manuscript of the New Testament. Paleographically it has been assigned to the 6th century.

== Description ==
The codex contains a small part of the Gospel of John 14:14-17.19-21.23-24.26-28 on a fragment of 1 parchment leaf (14 cm by 12 cm). It is written in two columns per page, 24 lines per page, in small uncial letters. It does not use breathings and accents; iota and ypsilon are written with diaeresis.

The Greek text of this codex is mixed. Aland placed it in Category III.

C. R. Gregory saw it in 1903. Gregory added it to the list of New Testament manuscripts in 1908. It was examined and described by Salonius.

Currently it is dated by the INTF to the 6th century.

The codex is located at the Berlin State Museums, in Berlin (P. 5877).

== See also ==
- List of New Testament uncials
- Related Bible parts: John 14
