= Uncial 0140 =

- New Testament manuscript
- Text: Acts of the Apostles 5 †
- Date: 10th century
- Script: Greek
- Found: Sinai, A. S. Lewis
- Now at: Saint Catherine's Monastery
- Size: 14.5 cm x 12 cm
- Type: mixed
- Category: III

Uncial 0140 (in the Gregory-Aland numbering), is a Greek uncial manuscript of the New Testament, dated paleographically to the 10th century.

== Description ==
The codex contains a small part of the Acts of the Apostles 5:34-38, on one parchment leaf (14.5 cm by 12 cm). It is written in one column per page, 18 lines per page, in uncial letters.

The Greek text of this codex is a representative of the mixed text-type. Aland placed it in Category III.

Currently it is dated by the INTF to the 10th century.

The codex now is located in Saint Catherine's Monastery (Sinai Harris App. 41).

== See also ==
- List of New Testament uncials
- Biblical manuscript
- Textual criticism
