= Uncial 0104 =

- New Testament manuscript
- Text: Matthew 23 †; Mark 1; 13-14 †
- Date: 6th-century
- Script: Greek
- Now at: Bibliothèque nationale de France
- Size: 32 x 22 cm
- Type: Byzantine text-type
- Category: V

Uncial 0104 (in the Gregory-Aland numbering), ε 44 (Soden), is a Greek uncial manuscript of the New Testament. It is dated paleographically to the 6th-century.

== Description ==
The codex contains a small parts of the Matthew 23:7-22; Mark 1:27-41; 13:12-14:3 on four parchment leaves (32 by 22 cm). It is written in two columns per page, 36 lines per page, in large uncial letters. It is a palimpsest, the upper text contains a homily in Hebrew.

The text is divided according to the κεφάλαια (chapters), with τίτλοι (titles). It contains lectionary markings at the margin (for liturgical use).

The Greek text of this codex is a representative of the Byzantine text-type. Aland placed it in Category V.

Currently it is dated by the INTF to the 6th-century.

The codex now is located in the Bibliothèque nationale de France (Suppl. Gr. 726, ff. 1-5, 8-10), at Paris.

== See also ==
- List of New Testament uncials
- Textual criticism
