= Uncial 095 =

- New Testament manuscript
- Text: Acts of the Apostles 2-3†
- Date: 8th-century
- Script: Greek
- Now at: National Library of Russia
- Size: 28 cm by 19 cm
- Type: Alexandrian/mixed
- Category: III

Uncial 095 (in the Gregory-Aland numbering), α 1002 (Soden), is a Greek uncial manuscript of the New Testament, dated paleographically to the 8th-century.

== Description ==
The codex contains a small part of the Acts of the Apostles 2:45-3:8, on one parchment leaf (28 cm by 19 cm). The text is written in one column per page, 21 lines per page, in large uncial letters.

The manuscript was part of the same codex to which Uncial 0123 belonged. It contains texts of Acts 2:22, 26-28, 45-3:2. 0123 was examined by de Muralt and cited by Tischendorf. Formerly it was classified as lectionary Apostolarion. It was labelled as 72^{a} by Scrivener, as 70^{a} by Gregory.

The Greek text of this codex is mixed. Aland placed it in Category III.

== Present location ==
Currently it is dated by the INTF to the 8th-century.

Constantin von Tischendorf brought it from Sinai.

The codex 095 is located now in the National Library of Russia (Gr. 17). The codex 0123 has a catalogue number Gr. 49, 1-2, frag. in the same library in Saint Petersburg.

== See also ==
- List of New Testament uncials
- Textual criticism
