= Uncial 079 =

- New Testament manuscript
- Text: Luke 7; 24
- Date: 6th century
- Script: Greek
- Now at: Russian National Library
- Size: 31 x 25 cm
- Type: mixed / Byzantine
- Category: III

Uncial 079 (in the Gregory-Aland numbering), ε 16 (Soden), is a Greek uncial manuscript of the New Testament, dated paleographically to the 6th century.

== Description ==
The codex contains a small part of the Gospel of Luke 7:39-49; 24:10-19 on 2 parchment leaves (31 cm by 25 cm). It is written in two columns per page, 23 lines per page.

It is a palimpsest, the upper later text was written in Georgian language.

The Greek text of this codex is mixed with predominate element the Byzantine text-type. Aland placed it in Category III.

Currently it is dated by the INTF to the 6th century.

The text of the palimpsest was deciphered and edited by Constantin von Tischendorf in 1846. It was also examined by Kurt Treu.

The codex now is located at the Russian National Library (Suppl. Gr. 13, fol. 8-10) in Saint Petersburg.

== See also ==
- List of New Testament uncials
- Textual criticism
