= Uncial 0116 =

- New Testament manuscript
- Text: Matthew 19–21; 26–27; Mark 13–14; Luke 3–4 †
- Date: 8th-century
- Script: Greek
- Now at: Biblioteca Nazionale Vittorio Emanuele III
- Size: 26 x 20 cm
- Type: Byzantine text-type
- Category: V

Uncial 0116 (in the Gregory-Aland numbering), ε 58 (Soden); is a Greek uncial manuscript of the New Testament, dated paleographically to the 8th-century. Formerly it was labelled at first by R (Griesbach and Scholz), then by W^{b} (Tischendorf), because letter R was reserved for Codex Nitriensis.

== Description ==
The codex contains a small parts of the Matthew 19:14-28; 20:23-21:2; 26:52-27:1; Mark 13:21-14:67; Luke 3:1-4:20, on 14 thick parchment leaves (26 cm by 20 cm). The text is written in two columns per page, 25 lines per page, in oblong uncial letters, leaning to the right. It contains the Ammonian Sections numbers, without references to the Eusebian Canons (erased), and lectionary markings at the margin (for liturgical use).

It is a palimpsests.

The Greek text of this codex is a representative of the Byzantine text-type. Aland placed it in Category V.

== History ==
Currently it is dated by the INTF to the 8th-century.

The codex was examined by Griesbach and Scholz. In 1843 it was exposed to chemicals by Tischendorf, who collated its text. Tischendorf pronounces to be an Evangelistarium.

The codex now is located in the Biblioteca Nazionale (II C 15), in Naples.

== See also ==
- List of New Testament uncials
- Textual criticism
- Biblical manuscript
