= Minuscule 917 =

- New Testament manuscript
- Text: Book of Acts, Pauline epistles
- Date: 12th century
- Script: Greek
- Now at: Escurial
- Size: 25.8 cm by 15.3 cm
- Type: Byzantine text-type
- Category: III, V

Minuscule 917 (in the Gregory-Aland numbering), α264 (von Soden), is a 12th-century Greek minuscule manuscript of the New Testament on parchment. The manuscript has not survived in complete condition.

== Description ==
The codex contains the text of the Book of Acts, Catholic epistles and Pauline epistles, on 137 parchment leaves (size 25.8 cm by 15.3 cm).

The text is written in one column per page, and 36 lines per page.

It contains lectionary markings at the margin for liturgical ruse.

== Text ==
Kurt Aland the Greek text of the codex placed in Category III in the Pauline epistles, and in Category V elsewhere. It means it is a representative of the Byzantine text-type in the Pauline epistles. In the rest of books of the New Testament its text is of higher quality.

== History ==
According to C. R. Gregory the manuscript was written in the 12th century. Currently the manuscript is dated by the INTF to the 12th century.

It was described by Montana, who sent description to Mr. Kelly.

The manuscript was added to the list of New Testament manuscripts by Scrivener (205^{a}) and Gregory (233^{a}, 473^{p}). In 1908 Gregory gave the number 917 to it.

It is currently housed in the Biblioteca de El Escorial (C. III. 10) in Escurial.

== See also ==
- List of New Testament minuscules
- Biblical manuscript
- Textual criticism
