= Uncial 055 =

- New Testament manuscript
- Text: Gospels
- Date: 11th century
- Script: Greek
- Now at: National Library of France
- Size: 26 x 19.5 cm
- Type: Byzantine text-type
- Category: none
- Note: Commentary

Uncial 055 (in the Gregory-Aland numbering), is a Greek uncial manuscript of the New Testament, dated paleographically to the 11th century. The codex contains a commentary with incomplete text of the four Gospels, on 303 parchment leaves (26 cm by 19.5 cm).

== Description ==
The commentaries are placed in the Western order (Matthew, John, Luke, Mark). Three first Gospels used commentaries of Chrysostom, Gospel of Mark – Victorin's commentary.

The text is written in one column per page, 37 lines per page.

The manuscript is written in semi-uncial variously listed as an uncial and a minuscule, is reported as "very peculiar in its style and beautifully written". Hermann von Soden did not include it in his catalog. According to some scholars it is a commentary rather, but not a manuscript of New Testament.

The Greek text of this codex is a representative of the Byzantine text-type, but Aland did not placed it in any Category. It is one of very few uncial manuscripts not cited in Nestle-Aland Novum Testamentum Graece.

== History ==
Currently it is dated by the INTF to the 11th century.

The manuscript was examined by Scholz, Burgon, and Paulin Martin. C. R. Gregory saw it in 1885.

Formerly the manuscript was housed at the Dominus du Fresne. Currently the codex is located at the National Library of France (Gr. 201) in Paris.

== See also ==
- List of New Testament uncials
- Textual criticism
