= Uncial 0230 =

- New Testament manuscript
- Text: Ephesians 6:11-12
- Date: 4th century
- Script: Greek-Latin diglot
- Now at: Laurentian Library
- Size: 34 x 27 cm
- Type: Western (?)
- Category: none

Uncial 0230 (in the Gregory-Aland numbering), is a Greek-Latin uncial manuscript of the New Testament. The manuscript palaeographically has been assigned to the 4th century.

== Description ==
The manuscript contains a small parts of the Epistle to the Ephesians 6:11-12 in Greek and Ephesians 6:5-6 in Latin, on 1 parchment leaf (34 by 27 cm). It is written in two columns per page. Only four lines have been preserved (because of its fragmentary), but the original manuscripts was written in 19-24 per page. It is written colometrically. It has some kind of relationship to Codex Claromontanus.

The form of the letter Mu shows that the scribe was accustomed to the Coptic alphabet.

The Greek text of this codex is too brief to classify. Aland did not place it in any Category. It does not contain any variant readings of real importance for textual critics.

== History ==
The fragment was found near Antinoe in Egypt. It was published as 1306, among the Papiri Greci e Latini. On the list of the Greek New Testament manuscripts it has received the number 0230. In the Beuron edition of the Vetus Latina the Latin text has received the number 85.

It is dated by the Institute for New Testament Textual Research to the 4th century.

It was described by Cardinal Giovanni Mercati.

The manuscript was added to the list of the New Testament manuscripts by Kurt Aland in 1953.

The codex used to be housed at the Laurentian Library (PSI 1306), in Florence. The owner of the codex is unknown.

== See also ==
- List of New Testament uncials
- Textual criticism
