= Uncial 078 =

- New Testament manuscript
- Text: Matthew 17-18; 19; Luke 18; John 4-5; 20
- Date: 6th century
- Script: Greek
- Now at: Russian National Library
- Size: 27 x 20 cm
- Type: mixed
- Category: III

Uncial 078 (in the Gregory-Aland numbering), ε 15 (Soden), is a Greek uncial manuscript of the New Testament, dated paleographically to the 6th century. It is a palimpsest.

== Description ==
The codex contains a small parts of the Matthew 17:22-18:3.11-19; 19:5-14; Luke 18:14-25; John 4:52-5:8; 20:17-26 on 6 parchment leaves (27 cm by 20 cm). The text is written in two columns per page, 22 lines per page.

It is a palimpsest, the upper text was written in the 10th century in Georgian language.

The Greek text of this codex was influenced by the Byzantine text-type. Aland placed it in Category III.

Tischendorf deciphered text of the palimpsest. David C. Parker gave a new reconstruction of the text of the Gospel of John.

Currently it is dated by the INTF to the 6th century.

The codex is located now at the Russian National Library (Suppl. Gr. 13, fol. 1-7) in Saint Petersburg.

== See also ==
- List of New Testament uncials
- Textual criticism
