= Uncial 097 =

- New Testament manuscript
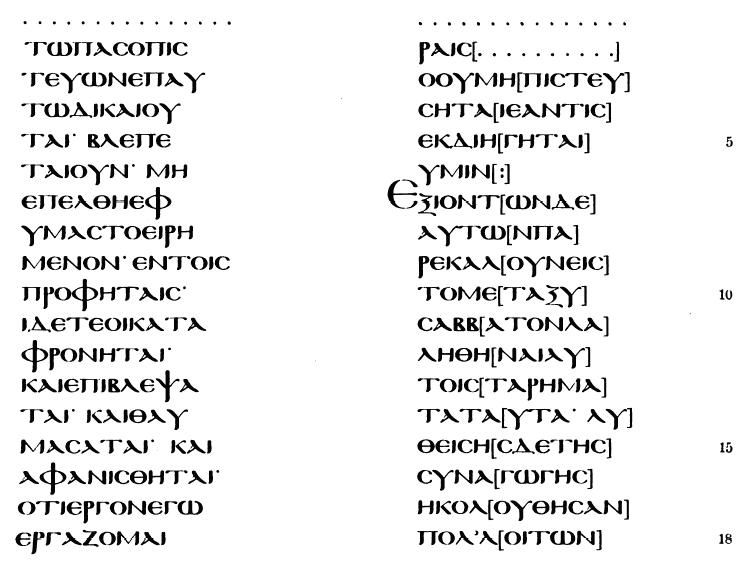
- Page with text of Acts 12:39-43 (Tischendorf's facsimile)
- Text: Acts of the Apostles 13:39-46
- Date: 7th-century
- Script: Greek
- Now at: Russian National Library
- Size: 26 x 21 cm
- Type: mixed / Byzantine
- Category: III / V

Uncial 097 (in the Gregory-Aland numbering), α 1003 (Soden), is a Greek uncial manuscript of the New Testament, dated palaeographically to the 7th-century.

== Description ==
The codex contains a small part of the Acts of the Apostles 13:39-46, on one parchment leaf (26 cm by 21 cm). The text is written in two columns per page, 18 lines per page, in large uncial letters. It is a palimpsest, the upper text was written in Georgian, in the 10th century.

== Text ==
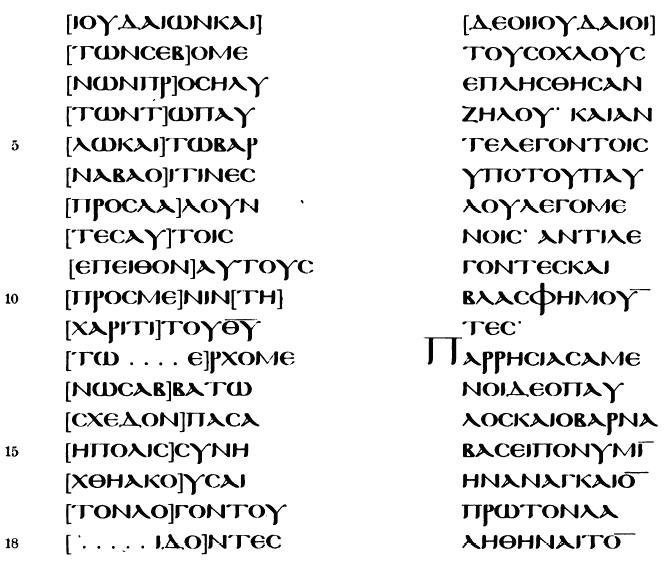
Page with text of Acts 12:43-46 in Tischendorf's facsimile edition (1855)

The Greek text of this codex is mixed, but predominate the Byzantine element. Aland placed it with some hesitation in Category III (Category V?).

== History ==
Currently it is dated by the INTF to the 7th-century.

The manuscript was examined by Constantin von Tischendorf, who published its text in facsimile edition. It was again examined by Kurt Treu.

The codex is located now at the Russian National Library (Gr. 18) in Saint Petersburg.

== See also ==
- List of New Testament uncials
- Textual criticism
