= Uncial 0256 =

- New Testament manuscript
- Text: John 6:32-33,35-37
- Date: 8th century
- Script: Greek
- Now at: Austrian National Library
- Size: 4 x 4 cm
- Type: mixed
- Category: III

Uncial 0256 (in the Gregory-Aland numbering) is a Greek uncial manuscript of the New Testament. Paleographically it has been assigned to the 8th century.

== Description ==
The codex contains two small parts of the Gospel of John 6:32-33,35-37, on one parchment leaf (4 cm by 4 cm). The text is written in one column per page, 4 or 6 lines per page, in uncial letters. It contains a commentary.

The nomina sacra are written in an abbreviated way.

== Text ==
The Greek text of this codex is mixed. Aland placed it in Category III.

It is dated by the INTF to the 8th century.

== Location ==
The codex is housed at the Austrian National Library (Pap. G. 26084) in Vienna. Karl Wessely believed the manuscript came from Fayyum.

== See also ==
- List of New Testament uncials
- Textual criticism
