= Uncial 0263 =

Greek uncial manuscript of the New Testament

- New Testament manuscript
- Text: Mark 5:26-27,31
- Date: 6th century
- Script: Greek
- Now at: Berlin State Museums
- Size: 28 x 22 cm
- Type: unknown
- Category: none

Uncial 0263 (in the Gregory-Aland numbering), is a Greek uncial manuscript of the New Testament. Paleographically, it has been assigned to the 6th century.

== Description ==
The codex contains small part of the Gospel of Mark 5:26-27,31, on one parchment leaf (28 cm by 22 cm). It is survived in a fragmentary condition. Written in one column per page, 17 lines per page, in uncial letters.

Currently, it is dated by the INTF to the 6th century.

== Location ==
Currently, the codex is housed at the Berlin State Museums (P. 14045) in Berlin.

== Text ==
The text-type of this codex is unknown, as the text is too brief to determine its textual character. Aland did not place it in any of Categories of New Testament manuscripts.

== See also ==
- List of New Testament uncials
- Textual criticism
