= Uncial 065 =

Uncial 0.80
- New Testament manuscript
- Text: John 11-12, 15-16, 19 †
- Date: 6th century
- Script: Greek
- Now at: Russian National Library
- Size: 29 x 23 cm
- Type: Byzantine text-type
- Category: V

Uncial 065 (in the Gregory-Aland numbering), ε 1 (Soden), is a Greek uncial manuscript of the New Testament, dated paleographically to the 6th century

== Description ==
The codex contains a small parts of the John 11:50-12:9, 15:12-16:2, 19:11-24, on 3 parchment leaves (29 cm by 23 cm). The text is written in two columns per page, 29 lines per page.

It is a palimpsest, the upper text contains a Georgian calendar.

The Greek text of this codex is a representative of the Byzantine text-type. Kurt Aland placed it in Category V.

Currently the manuscript is dated by the INTF to the 6th century.

It was examined by Tischendorf, Kurt Treu, and Schmid.

It is currently housed at the Russian National Library (Suppl. Gr. 6, I) in Saint Petersburg.

== See also ==
- List of New Testament uncials
- Textual criticism
