= Uncial 0251 =

- New Testament manuscript
- Text: 3 John 12-15 - Epistle of Jude 3-5
- Date: 6th century
- Script: Greek
- Now at: Musée du Louvre
- Size: 24 cm by 22 cm
- Type: mixed
- Category: III

Uncial 0251 (in the Gregory-Aland numbering), is a Greek uncial manuscript of the New Testament. Paleographically it has been assigned to the 6th century.

== Description ==
The codex contains a small part of the 3 John 12-15 - Epistle of Jude 3-5, on 1 parchment leaf (24 cm by 22 cm). It is written in one column per page, 22 lines per page, in uncial letters.

Currently it is dated by the INTF to the 6th century.

== Location ==
Currently the codex is housed at the Louvre (S.N. 121) in Paris.

== Text ==
The Greek text of this codex is mixed. Aland placed it in Category III.

In Jude 4 it has textual variant χαριν, like byzantine manuscripts, the alexandrian manuscripts prefer textual variant χαριτα.

== See also ==
- List of New Testament uncials
- Textual criticism
