= Uncial 093 =

- New Testament manuscript
- Text: Acts 24:22-25:5, 1 Pet 2:22-24; 3:1,3-7
- Date: 6th-century
- Script: Greek
- Now at: Cambridge University Library
- Size: 25 x 18 cm
- Type: Byzantine, Alexandrian
- Category: V, II

Uncial 093 (in the Gregory-Aland numbering), is a Greek uncial manuscript of the New Testament, dated palaeographically to the 6th century. Formerly it was designated by siglum ל.

== Description ==
The codex contains a small parts of the Acts 24:22-25:5, and 1 Pet 2:22-24; 3:1,3-7, on two parchment leaves (25 cm by 18 cm). According to C. R. Gregory it has 1½ leaves.

The text is written in two columns per page, 24 lines per page, in uncial letters. It is a palimpsest, the upper text is in Hebrew.

The Greek text of this codex is a representative of the Byzantine text-type in the Acts, and the Alexandrian text-type in 1 Peter. Aland placed it in Category V in Acts, and in Category II in 1 Peter.

Currently it is dated by the INTF to the 6th-century.

It was found in Cairo in genizah. It was examined by C. Taylor.

The codex now is located in the Cambridge University Library as a part of the Taylor-Schechter Collection (12,189; 12,208) in Cambridge.

== See also ==
- List of New Testament uncials
- Biblical manuscript
- Textual criticism
