= Uncial 0266 =

- New Testament manuscript
- Text: Luke 20:19-25,30-39
- Date: 6th century
- Script: Greek
- Now at: Berlin State Museums
- Size: 28 x 22 cm
- Type: mixed
- Category: III

Uncial 0266 (in the Gregory-Aland numbering), is a Greek uncial manuscript of the New Testament. Paleographically it has been assigned to the 6th century.

== Description ==
The codex contains two small parts of the Gospel of Luke 20:19-25,30-39, on one parchment leaf (28 cm by 22 cm). It is survived in a fragmentary condition. It is written in one column per page, 33 lines per page, in uncial letters.

Currently it is dated by the INTF to the 6th century.

It was examined by Kurt Treu and Horseley.

== Location ==
Currently the codex is housed at the Berlin State Museums (P. 17034) in Berlin.

== Text ==
The Greek text of this codex is mixed. Aland placed it in Category III.

== See also ==
- List of New Testament uncials
- Textual criticism
