= Minuscule 254 =

- New Testament manuscript
- Text: New Testament (except Gospels)
- Date: 14th century
- Script: Greek
- Now at: National Library of Greece
- Size: 25 cm by 17 cm
- Type: Alexandrian/Byzantine
- Category: III/V
- Note: marginalia

Minuscule 254 (in the Gregory-Aland numbering), ΟΘ^{42} (Soden), is a Greek minuscule manuscript of the New Testament, on paper. Palaeographically it had been assigned to the 11th century. Formerly it was labelled by 251^{a}, 301^{p}, 122^{r}. Scrivener labelled it by 201^{a}, 396^{p}, 86^{r}. It has marginalia.

== Description ==
The codex contains the text of the Acts, Catholic epistles, Paul, Book of Revelation on 453 paper leaves (25 by 17 centimetres (9.8 by 6.7 in)), with lacunae at the beginning and end. The text is written in 1 column per page, 42 lines per page. The biblical text is surrounded by a commentary (catena).

The text is divided according to the κεφαλαια (chapters), whose numbers are given at the margin.

It contains prolegomena, tables of the κεφαλαια (tables of contents) before sacred books, and Menologion. It has commentaries of Theophylact and Andreas Caesariensis.

== Text ==
The Greek text of the codex is a representative of the Alexandrian text-type in the Catholic epistles, and the Byzantine text-type elsewhere. Kurt Aland placed it in Category III in Catholic epistles and in Category V elsewhere.

== History ==
The manuscript was examined by Matthaei and Hoskier. Hoskier collated the text of the Apocalypse.

C. R. Gregory saw the manuscript in 1886. Formerly it was labelled by 251^{a}, 301^{p}, 122^{r}. In 1908 Gregory gave number 254 for it.

Currently the manuscript is housed at the National Library of Greece (490) in Athens.

== See also ==
- List of New Testament minuscules
- Biblical manuscript
- Textual criticism
