= Uncial 0107 =

- New Testament manuscript
- Text: Matthew 22-23 †; Mark 4-5 †
- Date: 7th-century
- Script: Greek
- Now at: Russian National Library
- Size: 27 x 21 cm
- Type: mixed
- Category: III

Uncial 0107 (in the Gregory-Aland numbering), ε 41 (Soden), is a Greek uncial manuscript of the New Testament, dated paleographically to the 7th-century. Formerly it was labelled by Θ^{b}.

== Description ==
The codex contains a small part of the Matthew 22:16-23:14; Mark 4:24-35; 5:14-23, on six parchment leaves (27 cm by 21 cm). It is written in two columns per page, 23 lines per page, in uncial letters. It is hard to decipher. Itacistic errors are frequent. The text is divided according to the Ammonian Sections, with a references to the Eusebian Canons (in red).

The Greek text of this codex is mixed. Aland placed it in Category III.

== History ==
Currently it is dated by the INTF to the 7th-century.

The manuscript was brought by Tischendorf from the East in 1859, and edited its text in Notitia (1860).

The codex is located now at the Russian National Library (Gr. 11) in Saint Petersburg.

== See also ==
- List of New Testament uncials
- Textual criticism
