= Uncial 0147 =

- New Testament manuscript
- Text: Luke 6:23-35
- Date: 6th century
- Script: Greek
- Size: 32 x 24 cm
- Type: mixed
- Category: III

Uncial 0147 (in the Gregory-Aland numbering), ε 38 (Soden), is a Greek uncial manuscript of the New Testament, dated palaeographically to the 6th century.

== Description ==
The codex contains a small part of the Gospel of Luke 6:23-35, on one parchment leaf (32 cm by 24 cm). The text is written in two columns per page, 24 lines per page, in uncial letters.

The Greek text of this codex is mixed. Kurt Aland placed it in Category III.

It is dated by the Institute for New Testament Textual Research to the 6th century.

The codex used to be held in Qubbat al-Khazna in Damascus (without catalogue number). The present location of the codex is unknown. The manuscript is not accessible.

== See also ==
- List of New Testament uncials
- Biblical manuscript
- Textual criticism
