= Uncial 0186 =

Uncial 486
- New Testament manuscript
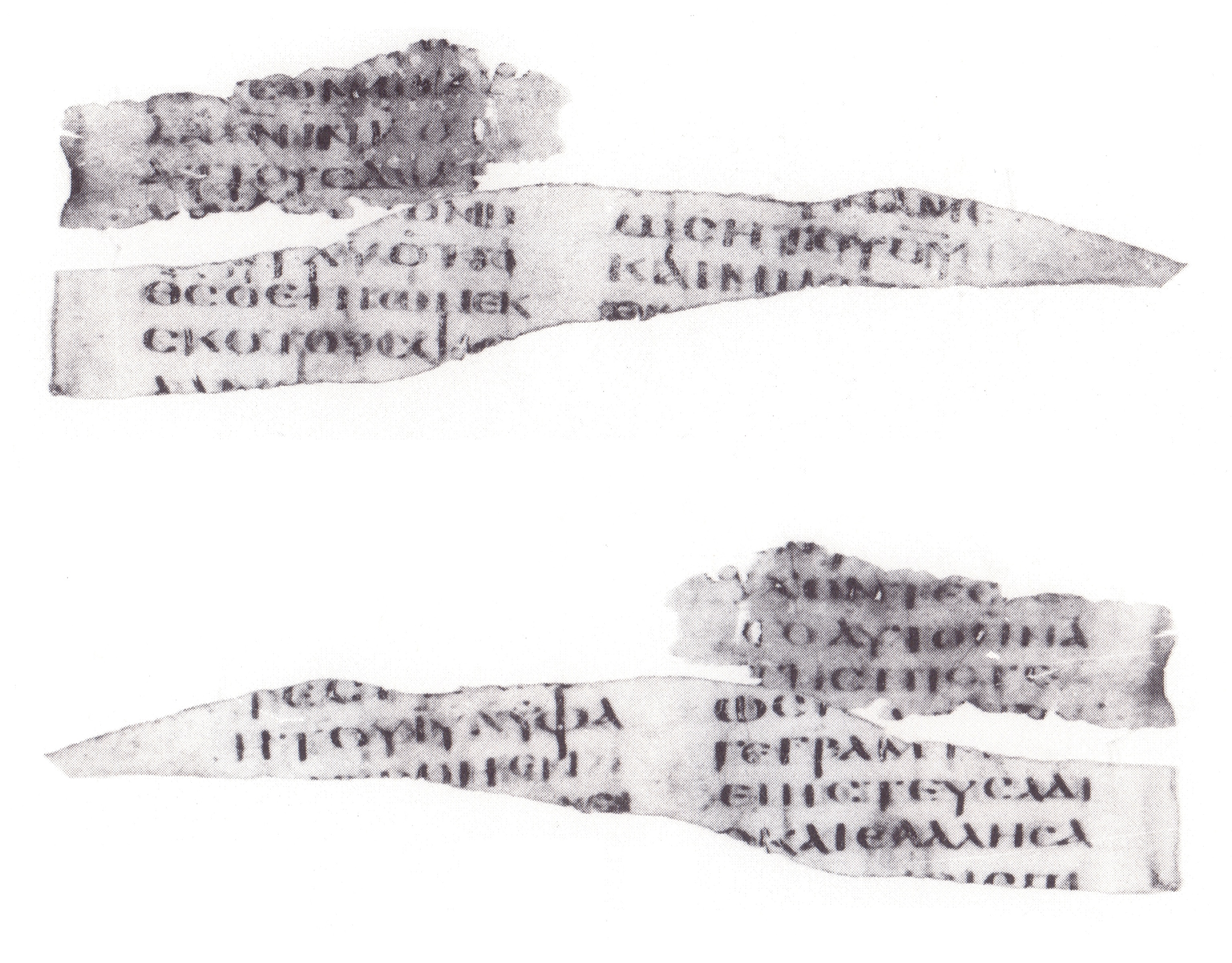
- Text: 2 Corinthians 4:5-8.10.13
- Date: 5th / 6th-century
- Script: Greek
- Now at: Austrian National Library
- Size: 18 x 15 cm
- Type: mixed
- Category: III

Uncial 0186 (in the Gregory-Aland numbering), is a Greek uncial manuscript of the New Testament, dated paleographically to the 5th-century (or 6th).

== Description ==
The codex contains small parts of the Second Epistle to the Corinthians 4:5-8.10.13, on two fragments of one parchment leaf (18 cm by 15 cm). It is written in two columns per page, 17 lines per page, in uncial letters.

The text-type of this codex is mixed. Aland placed it in Category III.

This manuscript was part of the same codex to which Uncial 0224 belonged. 0224 contains 2 Corinthians 4:5,12,13. It is currently housed at the Austrian National Library (Pap. G. 3075) in Vienna.

Currently it is dated by the INTF to the 5th or 6th-century.

The codex currently is housed at the Austrian National Library (Pap. G. 39788) in Vienna.

== See also ==
- List of New Testament uncials
- Textual criticism
