= Uncial 0131 =

- New Testament manuscript
- Text: Mark 7-9 †
- Date: 9th-century
- Script: Greek
- Found: 1857, William White
- Now at: Trinity College
- Size: 24.5 x 18.5 cm
- Type: mixed
- Category: III
- Note: close to א B D L Δ

Uncial 0131 (in the Gregory-Aland numbering), ε 81 (Soden), is a Greek uncial manuscript of the New Testament, dated paleographically to the 9th-century. Formerly it was labeled by W^{d}.

== Description ==
The codex contains a small part of the Mark 7:3-4.6-8.30-8:16; 9:2.7-9, on four parchment leaves (24.5 cm by 18.5 cm). The text is written in one column per page, 24 lines per page, in uncial letters. The letters are leaned in right. Breathings and accents are often very faint.

The text is divided according to the Ammonian Sections, without references to the Eusebian Canons, but a kind of harmony of the Gospels is given at the foot of the columns. The τιτλοι (titles) in red stand at the top of the pages. It has music notes.

== Text ==
The Greek text of this codex is mixed, with a strong element of the Alexandrian text-type. Kurt Aland placed it in Category III.

The text is different from the Textus Receptus in 7:3.6.30.31.32.33.34.35.36.37; 8:1.2.4.5.6.7.10.12.14.16; 9:2.7.8. It has unique reading in Mark 7:33 επτυσεν εις τους δακτυλους αυτου και (after κατιδιαν). According to Scrivener it is close to codices: א B D L Δ.

In Mark 7:35 it reads και του μογγιλαλου.

== History ==
It is dated by the INTF to the 9th-century.

The leaves of this manuscript were discovered by William White in 1857 in book of Gregory of Nazianzus. The codex came from the Athos. Since 1861 they are stored separately from this book, on the order of Henry Bradshaw.

The manuscript was examined and fully collated by F. H. A. Scrivener.

The codex is located now at the Trinity College (B VIII, 5) in Cambridge.

== See also ==
- List of New Testament uncials
- Textual criticism
