= Codex Vaticanus 2066 =

Uncial 046
- New Testament manuscript
- Name: Vaticanus 2066
- Text: Revelation of John
- Date: 10th century
- Script: Greek
- Now at: Vatican Library
- Cite: A. Mai, Novum Testamentum Graece ex antiquissimo Codice Vaticano, Rome 1859.
- Size: 27.5 x 19 cm
- Type: Byzantine text-type
- Category: V
- Note: close to minuscules 61, 69, 180

Codex Vaticanus 2066, designed by 046 (in the Gregory-Aland numbering), α 1070 (von Soden), formerly it was known also as Codex Basilianus, previously it was designated by B^{r} or B_{2}. It is a Greek uncial manuscript of the New Testament written on vellum. The manuscript paleographically has been assigned to the 10th century by the INTF, though some palaeographers proposed the 9th century. Scrivener proposed even the 8th century.

== Description ==
The codex contains the complete text of the Book of Revelation on 20 parchment leaves (27.5 cm by 19 cm), along with much non-biblical material (homilies of Basil the Great, Gregory of Nyssa and others).

The text is written in one column per page, 35 lines per page, in about 36 letters per line. The uncial letter of the codex are written in a peculiar form with special attention. "The uncials being of a peculiar kind, leaning a little to the right; they hold a sort of middle place between square and oblong characters.... The breathings and accents are primâ manu, and pretty correct..."

== Text ==
The Greek text of this codex is a representative of the Byzantine text-type, in a close relationship to the minuscules 61 and 69. Aland placed it in Category V.

Uncial 046 is the earliest manuscript which represented the main Byzantine group ("a").

=== Textual variants ===
Some textual variants:

- Rev 1:5

λύσαντι (freed) — P^{18}, א, A, C, 1611, 2020, 2050, 2081, 2329, 2351, 2814, h, Syriac; Primasius
λούσαντι (washed) — P, 046, 94, 1006, 1841, 1854, 1859, 2042, 2053, 2062, 2065, 2073, 2138, 2432, Vulgate, Bohairic

- Rev 1:6

βασιλειον (palace) — 046, 1854, 2050, 2351
βασιλεις και (kings and) — P, Byz^{A}

- Rev 4:8

ἅγιος ἅγιος ἅγιος (holy 3x) — A, Byz, ς, WH
ἅγιος ἅγιος ἅγιος ἅγιος ἅγιος ἅγιος ἅγιος ἅγιος (holy 8x) — א*
ἅγιος ἅγιος ἅγιος ἅγιος ἅγιος ἅγιος ἅγιος ἅγιος ἅγιος (holy 9x) — al, 046

- Rev 5:4

καὶ (and) — א, P, 1611 (text), 2053, 2081, 2344, 2814
καὶ ἐγὼ (and I) — 046, 94, 1006, 1611 (margin), 1859, 2020, 2042, 2065, 2073, 2432

- Rev 8:8

ορος μεγα καιομενον (a great mountain, burning) — 046, Syriac; Tyconius
ορος μεγα πυρι καιομενον (a great mountain, burning with fire) — Text of NA^{28}

- Rev 22:14

ποιουντες τας εντολας αυτου (those who do His commandments) — 046, 94, 1611, 1854, 1859, 2042, 2065, 2073, 2138, 2432, 2814
πλυνοντες τας στολας αυτων (those who wash their robes) — א, A, 1006, 2020, 2053

== History ==
The manuscript once belonged to Philippo Vitali (1590–1653). It was described by Bianchini.

According to Scrivener it was written in the 8th century.

The text of the codex was published by a Cardinal Angelo Mai in 1859 in Rome. It was examined by Tischendorf and Tregelles.

The codex is located now in the Vatican Library (Gr. 2066) in Rome.

== See also ==
- List of New Testament uncials
- Textual criticism
- Codex Vaticanus 2061
