= Uncial 0228 =

- New Testament manuscript
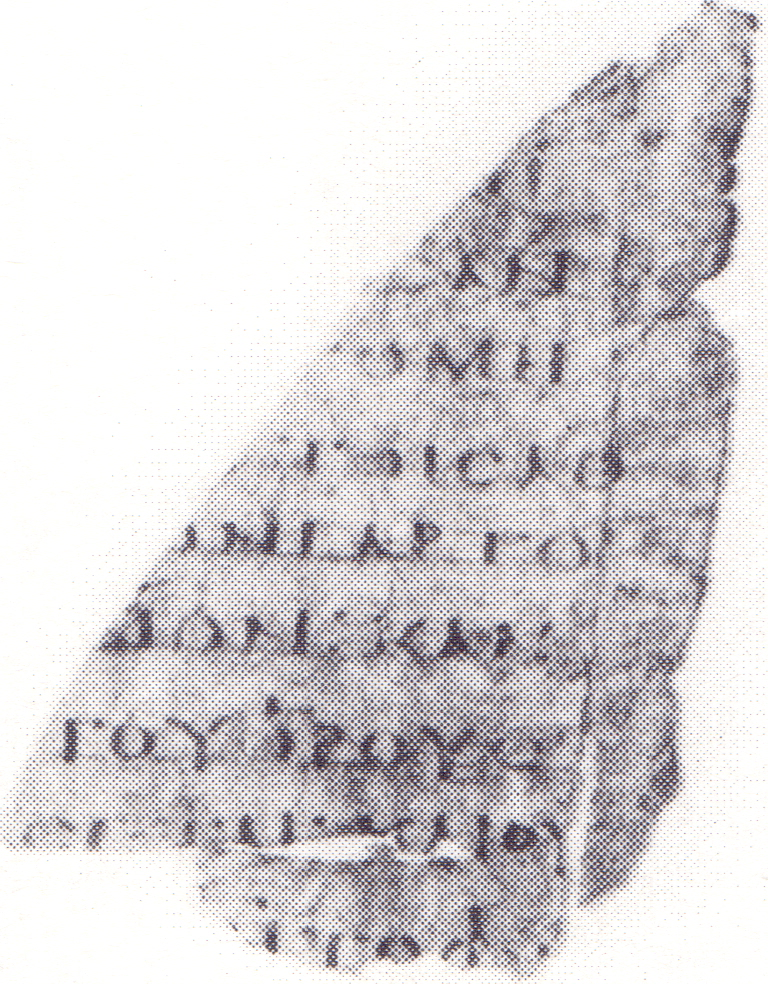
- Name: Vindobonensis Pap. G. 19888
- Text: Hebrews 12:19-21,23-25
- Date: 4th century
- Script: Greek
- Now at: Austrian National Library
- Size: 15 x 12 cm
- Type: mixed
- Category: III

Uncial 0228 (in the Gregory-Aland numbering), is a Greek uncial manuscript of the New Testament. The manuscript paleographically had been assigned to the 4th century. It contains a small parts of the Epistle to the Hebrews (12:19-21,23-25), on 1 parchment leaf (15 cm by 12 cm). Written in one column per page, 17 lines per page.

The Greek text of this codex is mixed. Aland placed it in Category III.

Currently it is dated by the INTF to the 4th century.

The manuscript was added to the list of the New Testament manuscripts by Kurt Aland in 1953.

The codex currently is housed at the Austrian National Library, in Vienna, with the shelf number Pap. G. 19888.

== See also ==
- List of New Testament uncials
- Textual criticism
