= Uncial 096 =

- New Testament manuscript
- Text: Acts 2; 26†
- Date: 7th-century
- Script: Greek
- Now at: Russian National Library
- Size: 29 x 22 cm
- Type: mixed
- Category: III

Uncial 096 (in the Gregory-Aland numbering), α 1004 (Soden), is a Greek uncial manuscript of the New Testament, dated paleographically to the 7th-century.

== Description ==
The codex contains a small part of the Acts of the Apostles 2:6-17; 26:7-18, on two parchment leaves (29 cm by 22 cm). The text is written in one column per page, 26 lines per page, in uncial letters. It is a palimpsest, the upper text was written in Georgian, in the 10th-century.

The Greek text of this codex is a mixture of text-types. Aland placed it in Category III.

Currently it is dated by the INTF to the 7th century.

The codex is located now at the Russian National Library (Gr. 19) in Saint Petersburg.

== See also ==
- List of New Testament uncials
- Textual criticism
