= Uncial 0132 =

- New Testament manuscript
- Text: Mark 5:16-40 †
- Date: 9th century
- Script: Greek
- Now at: Christ Church College
- Size: 25 x 17 cm
- Type: mixed
- Category: III

Uncial 0132 (in the Gregory-Aland numbering), ε 82 (Soden), is a Greek uncial manuscript of the New Testament, dated palaeographically to the 9th century. Formerly it was labelled by W^{f}.

== Description ==
The codex contains a small part of the Mark 5:16-40, on only one parchment leaf (25 cm by 17 cm). The text is written in two columns per page, 33 lines per page, in 14-18 letters per line. The uncial letters are large. It contains breathing and accents. The leaf has survived in a fragmentary condition.

It is a palimpsest, the upper text was written in the 11th century, it belongs to the Minuscule 639.

It has doxology in the Lord's Prayer.

== Text ==
It contains text: Mark 5:16 το δε αυτοις οι—θαλασσ[αν] 5:21. 22 ονοματι—αψωμαι [ς]ωθη 28.29 και εγνω—λαλουντος 35.35 σου απεθανεν—το παιδιον 40. According to Gregory its text is not good.

The Greek text of this codex is mixed, with a strong element of the Byzantine text-type. Aland placed it in Category III.

== History ==
It is dated by the INTF to the 9th century.

The manuscript was discovered by A. A. Vansittart. It was described by Kitchin, Tischendorf, and C. R. Gregory.

The codex is located now at Christ Church, Oxford (Wake 37, f. 237).

== See also ==
- List of New Testament uncials
- Textual criticism
