= Uncial 072 =

- New Testament manuscript
- Text: Mark
- Date: 5th/6th century
- Script: Greek
- Now at: Qubbat al-Khazna
- Size: 20 x 15 cm
- Type: mixed
- Category: III

Uncial 072 (in the Gregory-Aland numbering), ε 011 (Soden), is a Greek uncial manuscript of the New Testament, dated palaeographically to the 5th/6th century.

== Description ==
The codex contains a part of the Gospel of Mark (2:23-3:5), with only one parchment leaf (20 cm by 15 cm) surviving. The text is written in one column per page, 22 lines per page. It is a palimpsest. The upper text is Arabic.

The Greek text of this codex is mixed. Aland placed it in Category III.

It is dated by the Institute for New Testament Textual Research to the 5th or 6th century.

The codex used to be located in Damascus, in Qubbat al-Khazna.

== See also ==
- List of New Testament uncials
- Textual criticism
