= Uncial 0221 =

- New Testament manuscript
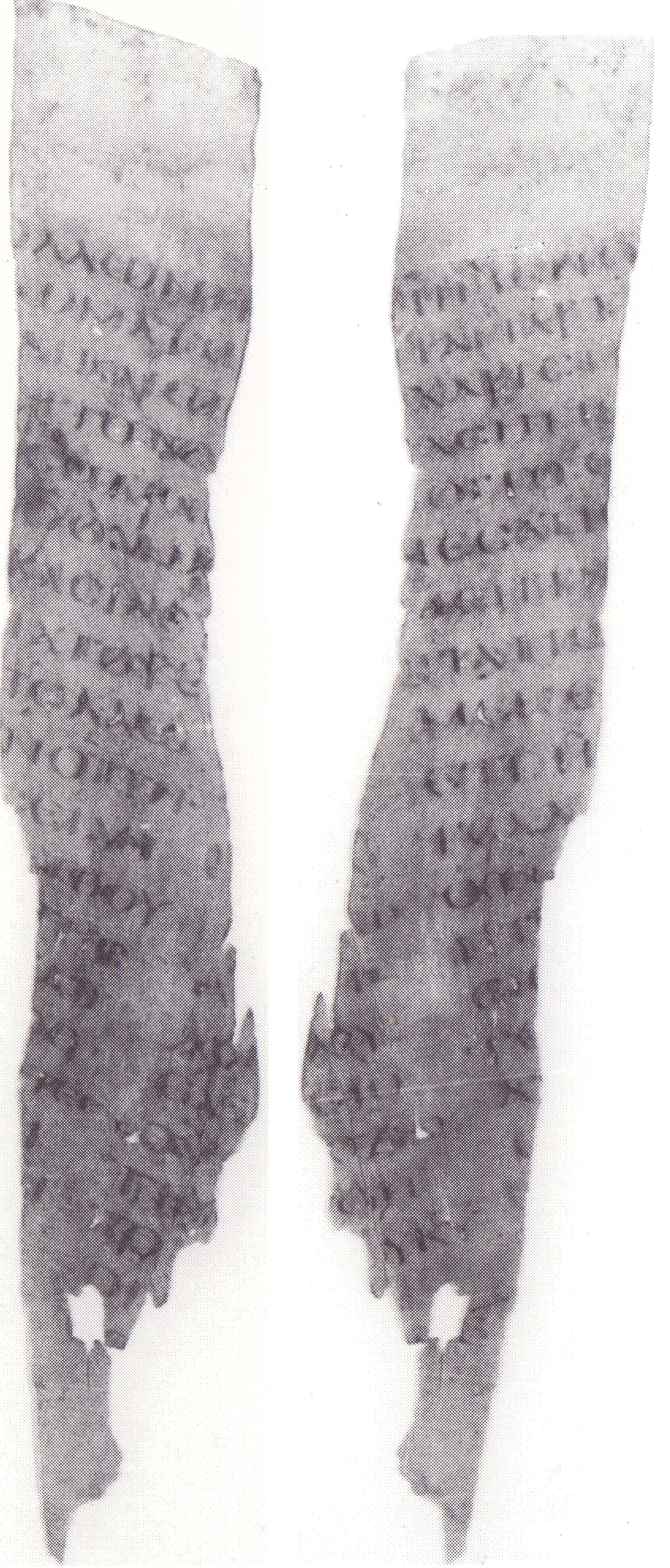
- 0221 recto & verso with the text of Romans 5:16-17.19.21-6:3
- Text: Romans 5:16-17,19,21-6:3
- Date: 4th century
- Script: Greek
- Now at: Austrian National Library
- Size: 18 x 16 cm
- Type: mixed
- Category: III

Uncial 0221 (in the Gregory-Aland numbering), is a Greek uncial manuscript of the New Testament, dated palaeographically to the 4th century. The codex contains a small part of the Epistle to the Romans (5:16-17,19,21-6:3) on 2 parchment leaves (18 cm by 16 cm). The text is written in two columns per page, 20 lines per page.

The Greek text of this codex is mixed. Aland placed it in Category III.

Currently it is dated by the INTF to the 4th century.

The manuscript was added to the list of the New Testament manuscripts by Kurt Aland in 1953. Peter Sanz publisher transcription in 1946. It was examined by Guglielmo Cavallo.

The codex currently is housed at the Austrian National Library in Vienna, with the shelf number Pap. G. 19890.

== See also ==
- List of New Testament uncials
- Textual criticism
