= Lectionary 1637 =

Lectionary ℓ 1637
- New Testament manuscript
- Text: Evangelistarion
- Date: 9th century
- Script: Greek
- Now at: University of Michigan
- Size: 30 by 26 cm

Lectionary 1637, or ℓ 1637 in the Gregory-Aland numbering, is a Greek manuscript of the New Testament on parchment leaves, dated paleographically to the 9th century.

== Description ==
It is written in Greek Uncial letters on 144 leaves (30 by 26 cm), 2 columns per page. The codex contains some Lessons from the four Gospels lectionary (Evangelistarium). The manuscript contains several library inserts. It is a palimpsest. The upper text is written in a minuscule hand.

It was described by Kenneth Willis Clark.

The codex now is located in the University of Michigan (MS. 37) in Ann Arbor.

== See also ==
- List of New Testament lectionaries
- Textual criticism
