= Minuscule 398 =

- New Testament manuscript
- Text: Acts, Paul
- Date: 10th century
- Script: Greek
- Now at: Cambridge University Library
- Size: 17.7 cm by 12.2 cm
- Type: eclectic
- Category: III/V

Minuscule 398 (in the Gregory-Aland numbering), α 189 (Soden), is a Greek minuscule manuscript of the New Testament, on parchment. Paleographically it has been assigned to the 10th century. Formerly it was designated by 9^{a} and 11^{p}.

== Description ==
The codex contains the text of the Acts of the Apostles, General epistles, and Pauline epistles on 251 parchment leaves (17.7 cm by 12.2 cm) with lacunae (Acts 3:6-17; 1 Timothy 4:12-2 Timothy 4:3; Hebrews 7:20-11:10; 11:23-13:25). It is written in one column per page, in 22 lines per page.

== Text ==
The Greek text of the codex is a representative of the Byzantine text-type with exception for the General epistles. Aland placed it in Category V (except General epistles). The text of General epistles Aland assigned to the Category III.

Aland gave for it the following textual profile: Acts 75^{1} 28^{1/2} 4^{2} 1^{s}, Cath 62^{1} 7^{1/2} 16^{2} 13^{s}, Paul 158^{1} 48^{1/2} 3^{2} 0^{S}.

1: agreements with the Byzantine text
1/2: agreements with the Byzantine text where it has the same reading as the original text
2: agreements with the original text
S: independent or distinctive readings ("Sonderlesarten").

== History ==
Gregory dated it to the 11th or 12th century. Currently it is dated by the INTF to the 10th century.

The manuscript once belonged to François Vatable, friend of Robert Estienne and professor of Hebrew in Paris. The manuscript probably was used in Editio Regia as ιγ'. It was slightly examined by Scholz, who catalogued it twice (as 9^{a} and 112^{a}). Fenton Hort examined Catholic epistles. C. R. Gregory saw it in 1886. In 1908 Gregory gave for it number 398.

In the 18th century it was used as an argument against the authenticity of the Comma Johanneum.

Formerly it was designated by 9^{a} and 11^{p}. In 1908 Gregory gave the number 398 to it.

The manuscript is currently housed at the Cambridge University Library (Kk. 6.4) in Cambridge.

== Former 398 ==
Formerly number 398 (Scholz) belonged to a commentary housed in the Turin National University Library (C. II. 5). It contains 310 leaves (31.1 by 21.8 cm), written in 2 columns and 30 lines per page, dated to the 13th century. Gregory saw it in 1886. In 1908 Gregory removed it from the list of the New Testament manuscripts because it is rather a commentary, with incomplete text of the Gospels. It was examined and described by Giuseppe Passini (as 109).

== See also ==
- List of New Testament minuscules
- Biblical manuscript
- Textual criticism
