= Minuscule 189 =

- New Testament manuscript
- Text: New Testament (except Rev.)
- Date: 14th century
- Script: Greek
- Now at: Laurentian Library
- Size: 11.5 cm by 9.8 cm
- Type: Byzantine text-type
- Category: V
- Hand: beautifully written
- Note: member of K^{r}

Minuscule 189 (in the Gregory-Aland numbering), α 269 (Soden), is a Greek minuscule manuscript of the New Testament, on parchment. Palaeographically it has been assigned to the 14th century. It has marginalia.

== Description ==
The codex contains the text of the four Gospels, Acts of the Apostles, Catholic epistles and Pauline epistles on 452 elegant parchment leaves (size 11.5 cm by 9.8 cm). The text is written in one column per page, in 24 lines per page, in light-black ink, capital letters in red. The letters are small and beautiful.

The text is divided according to the κεφαλαια (chapters), whose numbers are given at the margin. There is no τιτλοι (titles of chapters) at the top of the pages.

It contains lists of the κεφαλαια (tables of contents) before each book, lectionary equipment at the margin (for liturgical reading), αναγνωσεις (lessons), synaxaria, the Euthalian Apparatus to the Catholic and Pauline epistles. It has only one lacunae in John 19:38-21:25.

== Text ==
The Greek text of the codex is a representative of the Byzantine text-type. Aland placed it in Category V. Hermann von Soden classified it as member of the textual family K^{r}. According to the Claremont Profile Method it represents K^{r} in Luke 1 and Luke 20. In Luke 10 no profile was made.

== History ==
It was examined by Birch, Scholz, Burgon, and C. R. Gregory (1886).

It is currently housed at the Laurentian Library (Plutei. VI. 27), at Florence.

== See also ==
- List of New Testament minuscules
- Biblical manuscript
- Textual criticism
