= Lectionary 37 =

Lectionary ℓ 37
- New Testament manuscript
- Text: Evangelistarion
- Date: 12th-century
- Script: Greek
- Now at: Vatican Library
- Size: 27.4 cm by 21.9 cm

Lectionary 37, designated by siglum ℓ 37 (in the Gregory-Aland numbering). It is a Greek manuscript of the New Testament, on parchment leaves. Palaeographically it has been assigned to the 12th century.

== Description ==
The codex contains only 13 lessons from the Gospels of John and Luke lectionary (Evangelistarium), with lacunae. It is written in Greek minuscule letters, on 184 parchment leaves (27.4 cm by 21.9 cm), in two columns per page, in 24 lines per page.

It contains the pericope John 8:3-11.

== History ==
Formerly it was held at the Karakalou monastery at Athos peninsula.

The manuscript was examined by Birch.

The manuscript is sporadically cited in the critical editions of the Greek New Testament (UBS3).

Currently the codex is located in the Vatican Library (Borg. Gr. 6) in Rome.

== See also ==
- List of New Testament lectionaries
- Biblical manuscript
- Textual criticism

== Bibliography ==
- Gregory, Caspar René (1900). Textkritik des Neuen Testaments. Vol. 1. Leipzig: J.C. Hinrichs. pp. 390–391.
