= Palimpsest =

Reused manuscript with visible prior text

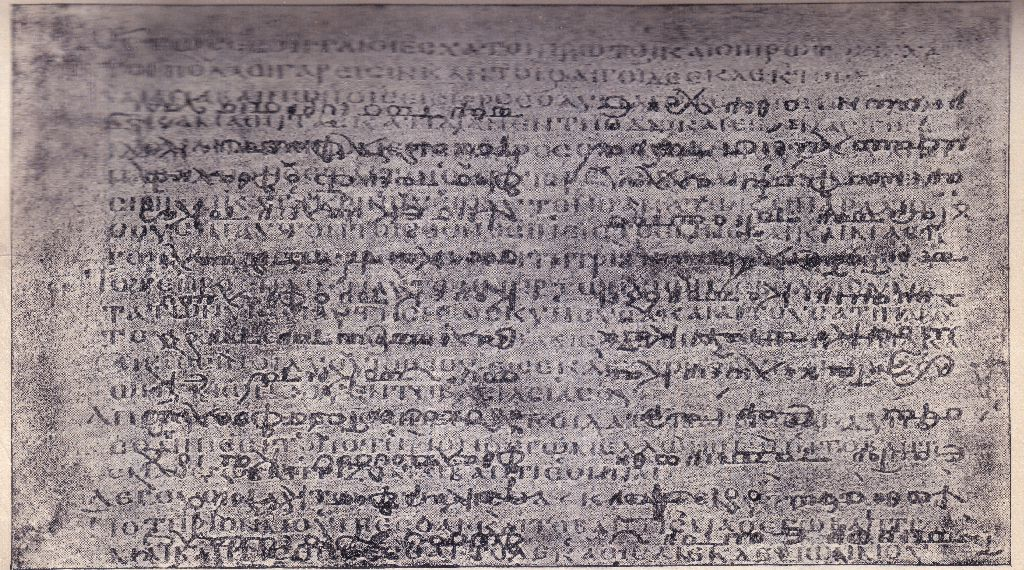
The Codex Ephraemi Rescriptus, a Greek manuscript of the Bible from the 5th century, is a palimpsest.

In textual studies, a palimpsest (/ˈpælɪmpsɛst/) is a manuscript page, either from a scroll or a book, from which the text has been scraped or washed off in preparation for reuse in the form of another document. Parchment was made of lamb, calf, or goat skin and was expensive and not readily available, so, in the interest of economy, a page was often reused by scraping off the previous writing. In colloquial usage, the term palimpsest is also used in architecture, archaeology and geomorphology to denote an object made or worked upon for one purpose and later reused for another; for example, a monumental brass on which the blank reverse side has been re-engraved.

== Etymology ==
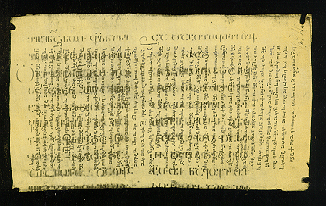
A Georgian palimpsest from the 5th or 6th century

The word palimpsest derives from Latin palimpsestus, which derives from παλίμψηστος, palímpsēstos (from Ancient Greek πάλιν (pálin) 'again' and ψάω (psáō) 'scrape'), a compound word that describes the process: "The original writing was scraped and washed off, the surface resmoothed, and the new literary material written on the salvaged material." The Ancient Greeks used wax-coated tablets to write on with a stylus, and to erase the writing by smoothing the wax surface and writing again. This practice was adopted by Ancient Romans, who also wrote on reusable wax-coated tablets; Cicero's use of the term palimpsest confirms such a practice.

== Development ==
Because parchment prepared from animal hides is far more durable than paper or papyrus, most palimpsests known to modern scholars are parchment, which rose in popularity in Western Europe after the 6th century. Where papyrus was in common use, reuse of writing media was less common because papyrus was cheaper and more expendable than costly parchment. Some papyrus palimpsests do survive, and Romans referred to this custom of washing papyrus. (Note: According to Suetonius, Augustus, "though he began a tragedy with great zest, becoming dissatisfied with the style, he obliterated the whole; and his friends saying to him, What is your Ajax doing? He answered, My Ajax met with a sponge." (Augustus, 85). Cf. a letter of the future emperor Marcus Aurelius to his friend and teacher Fronto (ad M. Caesarem, 4.5), in which the former, dissatisfied with a piece of his own writing, facetiously exclaims that he will "consecrate it to water (lymphis) or fire (Volcano)," i.e. that he will rub out or burn what he has written.)

The writing was washed from parchment or vellum using milk and oat bran. With the passing of time, the faint remains of the former writing would reappear enough so that scholars can discern the text (called the scriptio inferior, the 'underwriting') and decipher it. In the later Middle Ages the surface of the vellum was usually scraped away with powdered pumice, irretrievably losing the writing; hence the most valuable palimpsests are those that were overwritten in the early Middle Ages.

Medieval codices are constructed in "gathers" which are folded (compare folio, 'leaf, page' ablative case of Latin folium), then stacked together like a newspaper and sewn together at the fold. Prepared parchment sheets retained their original central fold, so each was ordinarily cut in half, making a quarto volume of the original folio, with the overwritten text running perpendicular to the effaced text.

== Modern decipherment ==
Faint legible remains were read by eye before 20th-century techniques helped make lost texts readable. To read palimpsests, scholars of the 19th century used chemical means that were sometimes very destructive, using tincture of gall or, later, ammonium bisulfate. Modern methods of reading palimpsests using ultraviolet light and photography are less damaging.

Innovative digitized images aid scholars in deciphering unreadable palimpsests. Superexposed photographs exposed in various light spectra, a technique called "multispectral filming", can increase the contrast of faded ink on parchment that is too indistinct to be read by eye in normal light. For example, multispectral imaging undertaken by researchers at the Rochester Institute of Technology and Johns Hopkins University recovered much of the undertext (estimated to be more than 80%) from the Archimedes Palimpsest. At the Walters Art Museum where the palimpsest is now conserved, the project has focused on experimental techniques to retrieve the remaining text, some of which was obscured by overpainted icons. One of the most successful techniques for reading through the paint proved to be X-ray fluorescence imaging, through which the iron in the ink is revealed. A team of imaging scientists and scholars from the United States and Europe is currently using spectral imaging techniques developed for imaging the Archimedes Palimpsest to study more than one hundred palimpsests in the library of Saint Catherine's Monastery in the Sinai Peninsula in Egypt. X-rays from a synchrotron light source have also been used to reveal text hidden under layers of other text in Hipparchus' Star Catalogue.

== Recovery ==
A number of ancient works have survived only as palimpsests. (Note: The most accessible overviews of the transmission of texts through the cultural bottleneck are Leighton D. Reynolds (editor), in Texts and Transmission: A Survey of the Latin Classics, where the texts that survived, fortuitously, only in palimpsest may be enumerated, and in his general introduction to textual transmission, Scribes and Scholars: A Guide to the Transmission of Greek and Latin Literature (with N.G. Wilson).) Vellum manuscripts were overwritten on purpose mostly due to the dearth or cost of the material. In the case of Greek manuscripts, the consumption of old codices for the sake of the material was so great that a synodal decree of the year 691 forbade the destruction of manuscripts of the Scriptures or the Church Fathers, except for imperfect or injured volumes. Such a decree put added pressure on retrieving the vellum on which secular manuscripts were written. The decline of the vellum trade with the introduction of paper exacerbated the scarcity, increasing pressure to reuse material.

Texts most susceptible to being overwritten included obsolete legal and liturgical ones, sometimes of intense interest to the historian. Early Latin translations of Scripture were rendered obsolete by Jerome's Vulgate. Texts might be in foreign languages or written in unfamiliar scripts that had become illegible over time. The codices themselves might be already damaged or incomplete. Heretical texts were dangerous to harbor—there were compelling political and religious reasons to destroy texts viewed as heresy, and to reuse the media was less wasteful than simply to burn the books.

Vast destruction of the broad quartos of the early centuries took place in the period which followed the fall of the Western Roman Empire, but palimpsests were also created as new texts were required during the Carolingian Renaissance. The most valuable Latin palimpsests are found in the codices which were remade from the early large folios in the 7th to the 9th centuries. It has been noticed that no entire work is generally found in any instance in the original text of a palimpsest, but that portions of many works have been taken to make up a single volume. An exception is the Archimedes Palimpsest (see below). On the whole, early medieval scribes were thus not indiscriminate in supplying themselves with material from any old volumes that happened to be at hand.

== Famous examples ==
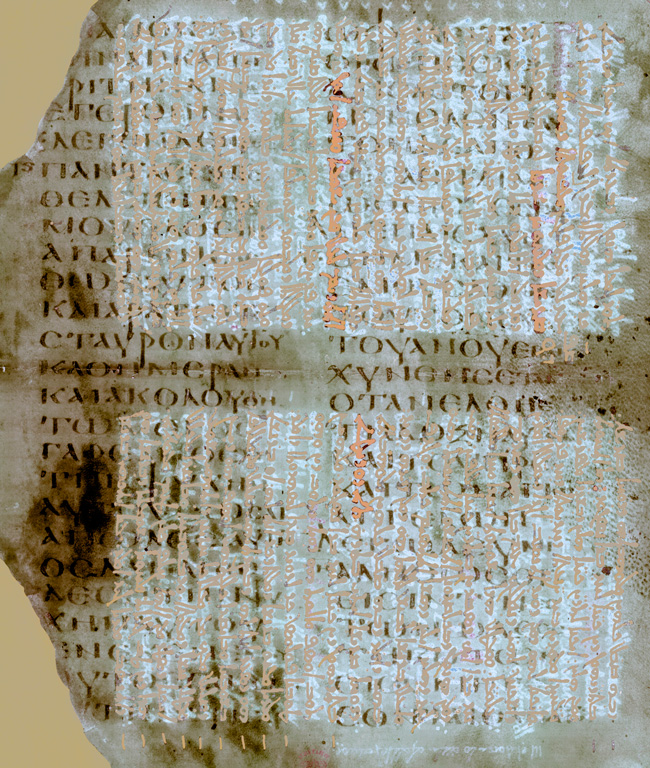
Codex Nitriensis, with Greek text of Luke 9:22–33 (lower text)

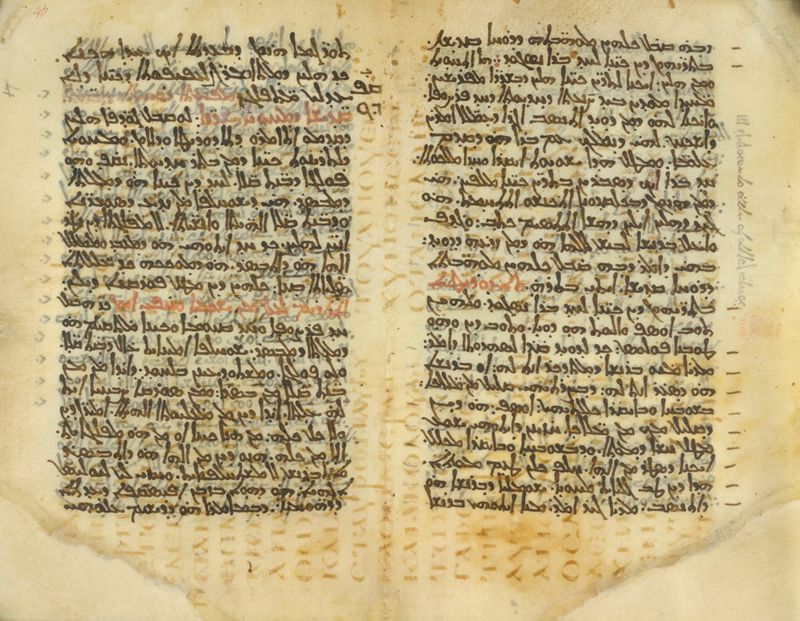
Codex Nitriensis, with Syriac text (upper text)

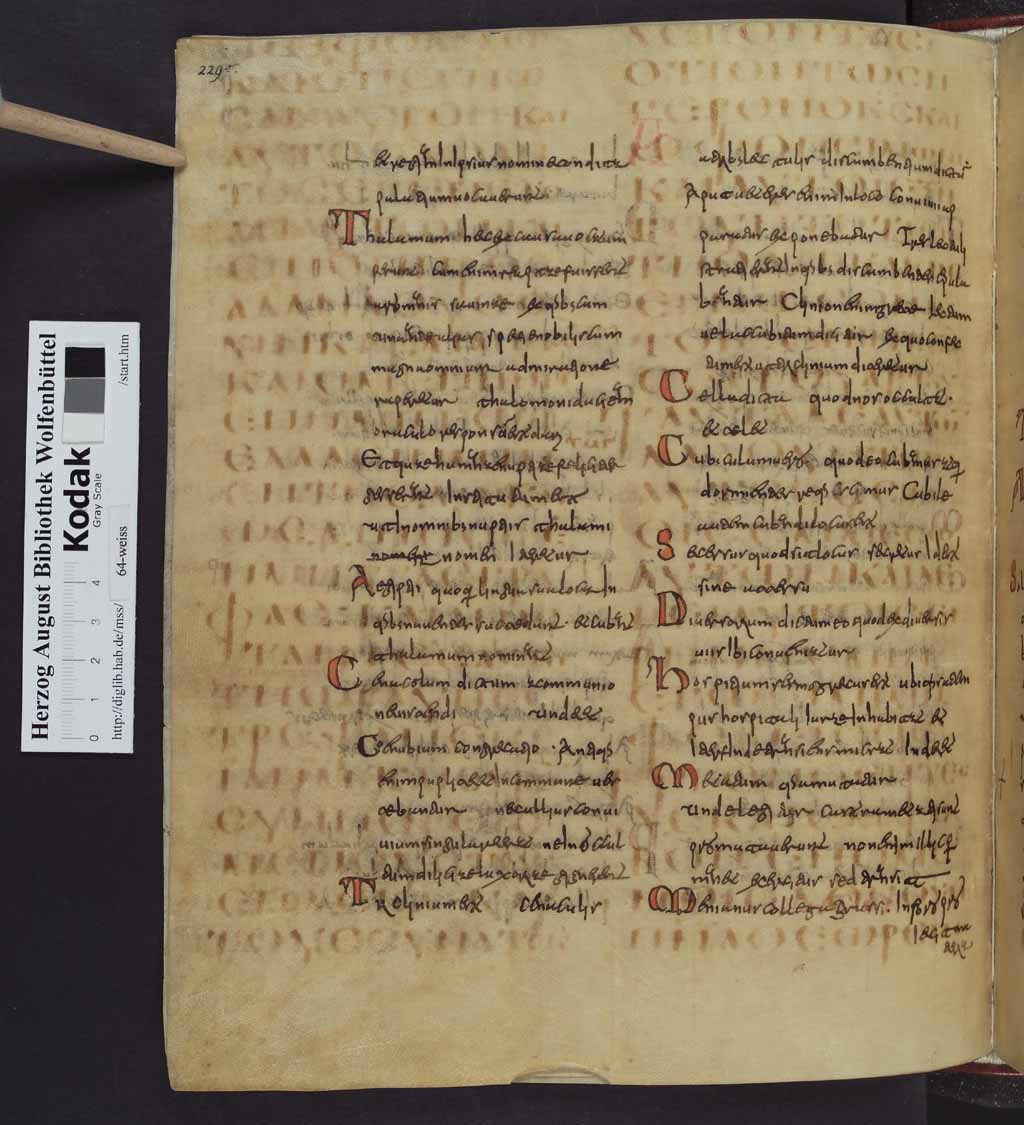
The Wolfenbüttel Codex Guelferbytanus A

- The best-known palimpsest in the legal world was discovered in 1816 by Niebuhr and Savigny in the library of Verona cathedral. Underneath letters by St. Jerome and Gennadius was the almost complete text of the Institutes of Gaius, probably the first students' textbook on Roman law.
- The Codex Ephraemi Rescriptus, Bibliothèque Nationale de France, Paris: portions of the Old and New Testaments in Greek, attributed to the 5th century, are covered with works of Ephraem the Syrian in a hand of the 12th century.
- The Sanaa palimpsest is one of the oldest Quranic manuscripts in existence. Carbon dating of the parchment assigns a date somewhere before 671 with a probability of 99%. Given that surah 9, one of the last revealed chapters, is present and assuming the likely possibility that the undertext (the scriptio inferior) was written shortly after the preparation of the parchment, it was probably written relatively shortly (10 to 40 years) after the death of the Islamic prophet Muhammad. The undertext differs from the standard Quranic text and is therefore the most important documentary evidence for the existence of variant Quranic readings.
- Among the Syriac manuscripts obtained from the Nitrian Desert in Egypt, British Museum, London: important Greek texts, Add. Ms. 17212 with Syriac translation of St. Chrysostom's Homilies, of the 9th or 10th century, covers a Latin grammatical treatise from the 6th century.
- Codex Nitriensis, a volume containing a work of Severus of Antioch of the beginning of the 9th century, is written on palimpsest leaves taken from 6th-century manuscripts of the Iliad and the Gospel of Luke, both of the 6th century, and the Euclid's Elements of the 7th or 8th century, British Museum.
- A double palimpsest, in which a text of St. John Chrysostom, in Syriac, of the 9th or 10th century, covers a Latin grammatical treatise in a cursive hand of the 6th century, which in its turn covers the Latin annals of the historian Granius Licinianus, of the 5th century, British Museum.
- The only known hyper-palimpsest: the Novgorod Codex, where potentially hundreds of texts have left their traces on the wooden back wall of a wax tablet.
- The Ambrosian Plautus, in rustic capitals, of the 4th or 5th century, re-written with portions of the Bible in the 9th century, Ambrosian Library.
- Cicero, De re publica in uncials, of the 4th century, the sole surviving copy, covered by St. Augustine on the Psalms, of the 7th century, Vatican Library.
- The Codex Theodosianus of Turin, of the 5th or 6th century.
- The Fasti Consulares of Verona, of 486.
- The Arian fragment of the Vatican, of the 5th century.
- The letters of Cornelius Fronto, overwritten by the Acts of the Council of Chalcedon.
- The Archimedes Palimpsest, a work of the great Syracusan mathematician copied onto parchment in the 10th century and overwritten by a liturgical text in the 12th century.
- The Sinaitic Palimpsest, the oldest Syriac copy of the gospels, from the 4th century.
- The unique copy of a Greek grammatical text composed by Herodian for the emperor Marcus Aurelius in the 2nd century, preserved in the Österreichische Nationalbibliothek, Vienna.
- Codex Zacynthius – Greek palimpsest fragments of the gospel of Saint Luke, obtained in the island of Zante, by General Colin Macaulay, deciphered, transcribed and edited by Tregelles in 1861.
- The Codex Dublinensis (Codex Z) of St. Matthew's Gospel, at Trinity College Dublin, also deciphered by Tregelles in 1853.
- The Codex Guelferbytanus 64 Weissenburgensis, with text of Origins of Isidore, partly palimpsest, with texts of earlier codices Guelferbytanus A, Guelferbytanus B, Codex Carolinus, and several other texts Greek and Latin.
- The Jerusalem Palimpsest of Euripides contains fragments of the text of Euripides. Among these fragments, six plays are included: Hecuba, Phoenissae, Orestes, Andromacha, Hippolytus and Medea.

About sixty palimpsest manuscripts of the Greek New Testament have survived to the present day. Uncial codices include the Codex Porphyrianus, Codex Vaticanus 2061 (double palimpsest), and uncials 064, 065, 066, 067, 068 (double palimpsest), 072, 078, 079, 086, 088, 093, 094, 096, 097, 098, 0103, 0104, 0116, 0120, 0130, 0132, 0133, 0135, 0208, and 0209.

Lectionaries include Lectionary 226, and ℓ 1637.

== See also ==
- Pentimento
- Petroglyphs of Arpa-Uzen – rock art from the Bronze and Iron Ages later covered by Saka pictorials
