= Uncial 0291 =

- New Testament manuscript
- Text: Gospel of Luke 8:45-9:2
- Date: 7th/8th century
- Script: Greek
- Found: 1975
- Now at: Saint Catherine's Monastery
- Size: 15 cm by 12 cm
- Type: ?
- Category: ?

Uncial 0291 (in the Gregory-Aland numbering), is a Greek uncial manuscript of the New Testament. Palaeographically it has been assigned to the 7th or 8th century. Only one leaf of the codex has survived.

== Description ==
The codex contains a part of the text of the Gospel of Luke 8:45-9:2, on one parchment leaf (15 cm by 12 cm). The text is written in two columns per page, 27 lines per page, in small uncial letters.

Currently it is dated by the INTF to the 7th or 8th century.

== Location ==
It is one of the manuscripts discovered in Saint Catherine's Monastery at Sinai in May 1975, during the restoration work. Currently the codex is housed at the St. Catherine's Monastery (N.E. ΜΓ 1) in Sinai.

== See also ==
- List of New Testament uncials
- Biblical manuscript
- Textual criticism
