= Uncial 0280 =

- New Testament manuscript
- Text: Epistle to the Hebrews 9:14-18
- Date: 8th century
- Script: Greek
- Found: 1975
- Now at: Saint Catherine's Monastery
- Size: 31 cm by 23 cm
- Type: ?
- Category: ?

Uncial 0280 (in the Gregory-Aland numbering), is a Greek uncial manuscript of the New Testament. Paleographically it has been assigned to the 8th century.

== Description ==
The codex contains a small part of the Epistle to the Hebrews 9:14-18, on one parchment leaf (31 cm by 23 cm). The text is written in two columns per page, 24 lines per page, in uncial letters. It is a palimpsest.

Currently it is dated by the INTF to the 8th century.

== Location ==
It is one of the manuscripts discovered in Saint Catherine's Monastery, Sinai in May 1975, during restoration work. Currently the codex is housed at the monastery (N.E. ΜΓ 15a).

== See also ==
- List of New Testament uncials
- Biblical manuscript
- Textual criticism
