= Uncial 0286 =

- New Testament manuscript
- Text: Matthew 16:13-19; John 10:12-16
- Date: 10th/11th century
- Script: Greek
- Found: 1975
- Now at: Saint Catherine's Monastery
- Size: 17.5 cm by 16.5 cm
- Type: ?
- Category: ?

Uncial 0286 (in the Gregory-Aland numbering), is a Greek uncial manuscript of the New Testament. Palaeographically it has been assigned to the 10th or 11th century.

== Description ==
The codex contains the text of the Gospel of Matthew 16:13-19 and Gospel of John 10:12-16, on 2 parchment leaves (17.5 cm by 16.5 cm). The text is written in one column per page, 19 lines per page, in uncial letters. The leaves have survived in a fragmentary condition.

Currently it is dated by the INTF to the 10th or 11th century.

== Location ==
It is one of the manuscripts discovered in Saint Catherine's Monastery at Sinai in May 1975, during the restoration work. Currently the codex is housed at the St. Catherine's Monastery (N.E. ΜΓ 72) in Sinai.

== See also ==
- List of New Testament uncials
- Biblical manuscript
- Textual criticism
