= Uncial 0258 =

- New Testament manuscript
- Text: John 10:25-26
- Date: 4th century
- Script: Greek
- Now at: unknown
- Size: 4.7 x 4 cm
- Type: unknown
- Category: none

Uncial 0258 (in the Gregory-Aland numbering), is a Greek uncial manuscript of the New Testament. Paleographically it has been assigned to the 4th century.

== Description ==
The codex contains a small part of the Gospel of John 10:25-26, on 1 parchment leaf (4.7 cm by 4 cm). Probably it was written in one column per page, 5 lines per page, in uncial letters.

Nomina sacra are written in an abbreviated way.

Currently it is dated by the INTF to the 4th century.

== Location ==
Present location of the codex is unknown. It is not accessible.

== Text ==
The Greek text of this fragment follows the order and wording of the Nestle-Aland Greek text, reconstructed as ΤΟΥ Π̅Ρ̅Σ̅ ΜΟΥ ΤΑΥΤΑ ΜΑΡΤΥΡΕΙ ΠΕΡΙ ΕΜΟΥ ΑΛΛΑ ΥΜΕΙΣ ΟΥ ΠΙΣΤΕΥΕΤΕ ΟΤΙ ΟΥΚ ΕΣΤΕ ΕΚ. Aland did not placed it in any of Categories of New Testament manuscripts.

== See also ==
- List of New Testament uncials
- Textual criticism
