= Uncial 0300 =

- New Testament manuscript
- Text: Matthew 20:2-17
- Date: 6th/7th century
- Script: Greek
- Now at: Coptic Museum
- Size: [16 x 13 cm]

Uncial 0300 (in the Gregory-Aland numbering), is a Greek uncial manuscript of the New Testament. Palaeographically it has been assigned to the 6th or 7th century.

== Description ==
The codex contains the text of the Gospel of Matthew 20:2-17, on fragment of 1 parchment leaf (30.2 cm by 23.4 cm). The text is written in two columns per page, 25 lines per page, in uncial letters.

Currently it is dated by the INTF to the 6th or 7th century.

It is currently housed at the Coptic Museum (3525) in Cairo.

== See also ==
- List of New Testament uncials
- Biblical manuscripts
- Textual criticism
