= Uncial 0313 =

- New Testament manuscript
- Text: Gospel of Mark 4:9.15
- Date: 5th-century
- Script: Greek
- Now at: Corpus Christi College, Cambridge
- Size: [10 cm x 2 cm]

Uncial 0313 (in the Gregory-Aland numbering), is a Greek uncial manuscript of the New Testament. Palaeographically it has been assigned to the 5th-century.

The codex contains a small text of the Gospel of Mark 4:9.15, on one fragment of the one parchment leaf. The original size of the leaf is unknown; the surviving fragment is 10 by 2 cm.

The text is written in one column per page, and the original number of lines is unknown. The surviving fragment has only 2 lines.

Uncial 0313 is currently housed at the Christopher De Hamel Collection (Gk. Ms 3) at Corpus Christi College, Cambridge.

== See also ==
- List of New Testament uncials
- Biblical manuscript
- Textual criticism
