= Uncial 0305 =

- New Testament manuscript
- Text: Matthew 20:22-23.30-31
- Date: c. 400-500 ???
- Script: Greek
- Now at: Bibliothèque nationale de France
- Size: 24 x 17 cm

Uncial 0305 (in the Gregory-Aland numbering), is a Greek uncial manuscript of the New Testament. The survived fragment is too brief for certain dating on a basis of Paleography.

The codex contains a small texts of the Gospel of Matthew 20:22-23.30-31, on 1 parchment leaf (24 cm by 17 cm). The leaf survived in a fragmentary condition. Probably it was written in two columns per page, 25 (?) lines per page, in uncial letters.

It is currently housed at the Bibliothèque nationale de France (Copt. 133.2, fol. 3) in Paris.

== See also ==
- List of New Testament uncials
- Biblical manuscripts
- Textual criticism
