= Uncial 0282 =

- New Testament manuscript
- Text: Philippians 2:24-27; 3:6-8
- Date: 6th century
- Script: Greek
- Found: 1975
- Now at: Saint Catherine's Monastery
- Size: [25 x 18 cm]
- Type: ?
- Category: ?

Uncial 0282 (in the Gregory-Aland numbering), is a Greek uncial manuscript of the New Testament. Palaeographically it has been assigned to the 6th century.

== Description ==
The codex contains a small parts of the Epistle to the Philippians 2:24-27; 3:6-8, on 1 parchment leaf (25 cm by 18 cm). The text is written in two columns per page, 27 lines per page, in uncial letters.

The leaf survived in a fragmentary condition. It is a palimpsest.

Currently it is dated by the INTF to the 6th century.

== Location ==
It was one of the manuscripts discovered in Saint Catherine's Monastery, Sinai in May 1975, during restoration work. Currently the codex is housed at the monastery (N.E. ΜΓ 29a).

== See also ==
- List of New Testament uncials
- Biblical manuscript
- Textual criticism
