= Uncial 0290 =

- New Testament manuscript
- Text: Gospel of John 18:4-20:2
- Date: 9th-century
- Script: Greek-Arabic
- Found: 1975
- Now at: Saint Catherine's Monastery
- Size: 29 cm by 17 cm
- Type: ?
- Category: ?

Uncial 0290 (in the Gregory-Aland numbering), is a Greek-Arabic diglot uncial manuscript of the New Testament. Palaeographically it has been assigned to the 9th century.

== Description ==
The codex contains a part of the text of the Gospel of John 18:4-20:2, on 8 paper leaves (29 cm by 17 cm). The text is written in two columns per page, 24 lines per page, in uncial letters.

Currently it is dated by the INTF to the 9th century.

== Location ==
It is one of the manuscripts discovered in Saint Catherine's Monastery at Sinai in May 1975, during the restoration work. The text was published by L. Politis in 1980.

Currently the codex is housed at the St. Catherine's Monastery (N.E. ΜΓ 102) in Sinai.

== See also ==
- List of New Testament uncials
- Biblical manuscript
- Textual criticism
