= Uncial 0304 =

- New Testament manuscript
- Text: Acts 6:5-7.13
- Date: 9th century
- Script: Greek
- Now at: Bibliothèque nationale de France
- Size: 24 x 17 cm

Uncial 0304 (in the Gregory-Aland numbering), is a Greek uncial manuscript of the New Testament. Palaeographically it has been assigned to the 9th century.

== Description ==
The codex contains a small texts of the Acts 6:5-7.13, on 1 parchment leaf (24 cm by 17 cm). The leaf has survived in a fragmentary condition. It is written in two columns per page, 31 lines per page, in uncial letters.

Currently it is dated by the INTF to the 9th century.

It is currently housed at the Bibliothèque nationale de France (Gr. 1126 VII, fol. 160) in Paris.

== See also ==
- List of New Testament uncials
- Biblical manuscripts
- Textual criticism
