= Uncial 0168 =

- New Testament manuscript
- Text: Gospels †
- Date: 8th-century
- Script: Greek
- Now at: unknown
- Size: ?
- Type: ?
- Category: ?

Uncial 0168 (in the Gregory-Aland numbering), is a Greek uncial manuscript of the New Testament. It was dated paleographically to the 8th-century. The codex contained the four Gospels, with some lacunae. It was a palimpsest. The codex is now lost, and further details are unavailable.

Currently it is dated by the INTF to the 8th century. The codex was housed at the Melissa Brotherhood in Veria.

The text-type of this codex is unknown. Kurt Aland did not place it in any Category.

== See also ==
- List of New Testament uncials
- Textual criticism
