= Uncial 0287 =

- New Testament manuscript
- Text: Gospels †
- Date: 9th century
- Script: Greek-Arabic
- Found: 1975
- Now at: Saint Catherine's Monastery
- Size: 29.8 cm by 20.5 cm
- Type: ?
- Category: ?

Uncial 0287 (in the Gregory-Aland numbering), is a Greek-Arabic uncial manuscript of the New Testament. Paleographically it has been assigned to the 9th century.

== Description ==
The codex contains the text of the four Gospels with numerous lacunae, on 10+70 paper leaves (29.8 cm by 20.5 cm). The text is written in two columns per page, 22 lines per page, in uncial letters. The leaves survived in a fragmentary condition.

It contains texts Matthew 1-8; 21; 22,1-3; Mark 16:19; Luke 1-12; John 2; 10; 12; 13; 17; 20; 21.

Currently it is dated by the INTF to the 9th century.

== Location ==
It is one of the manuscripts discovered in Saint Catherine's Monastery at Sinai in May 1975, during the restoration work. Currently the codex is housed at the St. Catherine's Monastery (N.E. ΜΓ 97) in Sinai.

== See also ==
- List of New Testament uncials
- Biblical manuscript
- Textual criticism
