= Uncial 0279 =

- New Testament manuscript
- Text: Gospel of Luke 8:32-44; 22:3.15-16
- Date: 8th/9th century
- Script: Greek
- Found: 1975
- Now at: Saint Catherine's Monastery
- Size: 31 x 24 cm
- Type: ?
- Category: ?

Uncial 0279 (in the Gregory-Aland numbering), is a Greek uncial manuscript of the New Testament. Paleographically it has been assigned to the eighth or ninth centuries.

== Description ==
The codex contains a small parts of the Gospel of Luke 8:32-44; 22:3.15-16, on 2 parchment leaves (31 cm x 24 cm). They are in a fragmentary condition. The text is written in two columns per page, 25 lines per page, in uncial letters. It is a palimpsest, the upper text was written in Greek, in uncial letters, and contains liturgical texts.

Currently it is dated by the INTF to the 8th or 9th centuries.

== Location ==
Uncial 0279 is one of the manuscripts discovered in Saint Catherine's Monastery in Sinai in May 1975, during restoration work. Currently the codex is housed at the Saint Catherine's Monastery (N.E. ΜΓ 15).

== See also ==
- List of New Testament uncials
- Biblical manuscript
- Textual criticism
