= Uncial 0289 =

- New Testament manuscript
- Text: Romans 8 †; 1 Corinthians 2-4; 13-14 †
- Date: 7/8th century
- Script: Greek
- Found: 1975
- Now at: Saint Catherine's Monastery
- Size: 22 cm by 19 cm
- Type: ?
- Category: ?

Uncial 0289 (in the Gregory-Aland numbering), is a Greek uncial manuscript of the New Testament. Paleographically it has been assigned to the 7th or 8th century.

== Description ==
The codex contains a small parts of the text of the Romans 8:19-21.32-35; 1 Corinthians 2:11-4:12; 13:13-14:1.3-11.13-19, on 8 parchment leaves (22 cm by 19 cm). The text is written in two columns per page, 27 lines per page, in uncial letters.

The leaves have survived in a fragmentary condition. It is a palimpsest, the upper text is in Greek written by minuscule hand, it contains part of Old Testament.

Currently it is dated by the INTF to the 7 or 8th century.

== Location ==
It is one of the manuscripts discovered in Saint Catherine's Monastery at Sinai in May 1975, during the restoration work. Currently the codex is housed at the St. Catherine's Monastery (N.E. ΜΓ 99) in Sinai.

== See also ==
- List of New Testament uncials
- Biblical manuscript
- Textual criticism
