= Uncial 0309 =

- New Testament manuscript
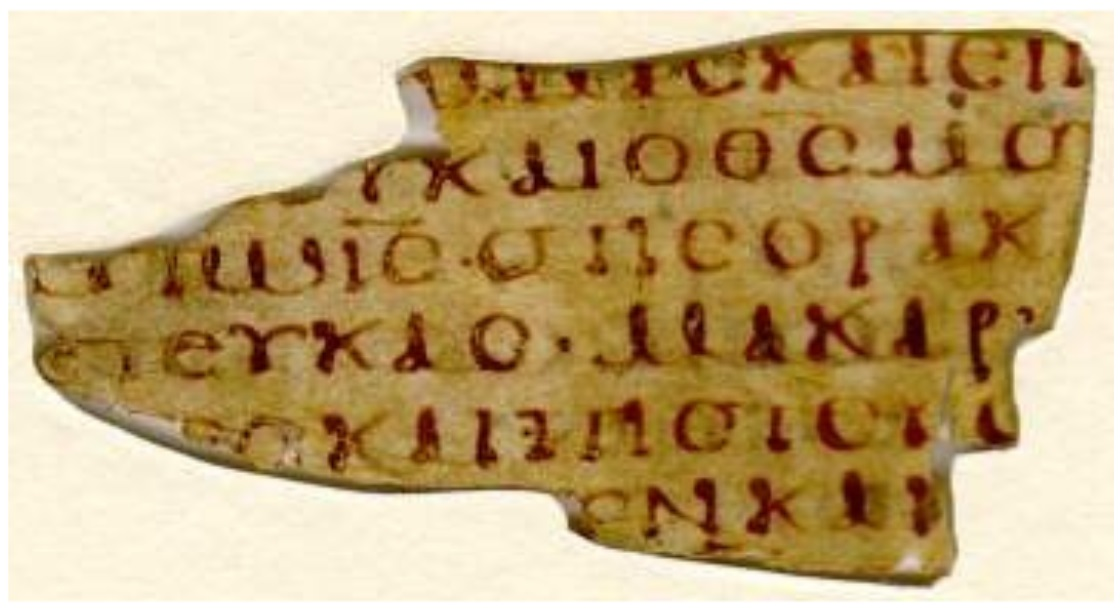
- Text: Gospel of John 20 †
- Date: 6th-century
- Script: Greek
- Now at: University of Cologne
- Cite: C. Römer, P. Köln VIII Tafel IVa, b
- Size: [18 x 13 cm]
- Category: ?

Uncial 0309 (in the Gregory-Aland numbering), is a Greek uncial manuscript of the New Testament. Paleographically it had been assigned to the 6th-century.

== Description ==
The codex contains parts of six verses of the Gospels, on a fragment of one parchment leaf. Probably the original leaf was 18 cm by 13 cm. Only a small fragment 6 by 3 cm survives. Page verso is more legible. It contains the text of the Gospel of John 20:22-24,28-30.

It was written in one column per page, 27 lines per page, with only 6 lines surviving, in uncial letters.

Currently it is dated by the INTF to the 6th-century.

It is currently housed at the Institut für die Altertumskunde of the University of Cologne (Inv. 806) in Cologne.

== See also ==
- List of New Testament uncials
- Biblical manuscripts
- Textual criticism
