= Uncial 0315 =

- New Testament manuscript
- Text: Gospel of Mark 2:9.21.25; 3:1-2
- Date: 4th/5th-century
- Script: Greek
- Now at: Cambridge
- Size: 29 by 20 (or 22) cm]
- Type: ?
- Category: ?

Uncial 0315 (in the Gregory-Aland numbering), is a Greek uncial manuscript of the New Testament. Palaeographically it has been assigned to the 4th or 5th-century.

The codex contains a small text of the Gospel of Mark 2:9.21.25; 3:1-2, on one fragment of the one parchment leaf. The original size of the leaf was 29 by 20 cm (or 22 cm).

The text is written in two columns per page, probably in 32 lines per page, in small uncial letters.

It is currently housed at the Christopher de Hamel Collection (Gk. Ms. 5) in Cambridge.

== See also ==
- List of New Testament uncials
- Biblical manuscript
- Textual criticism
