= Uncial 0283 =

- New Testament manuscript
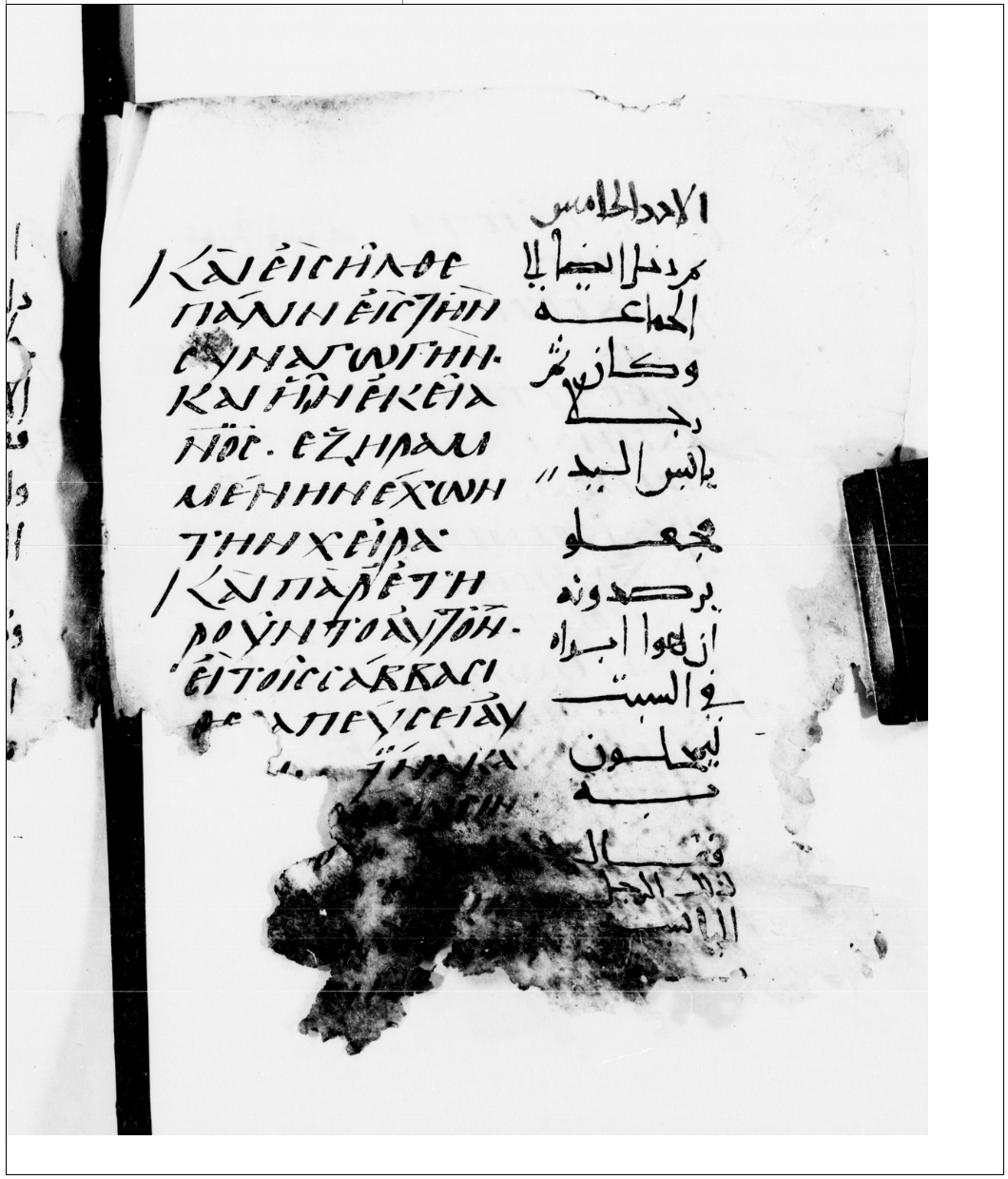
- Text: Mark 2-3; 5; 6; 9; 14; 15 †
- Date: 9th century
- Script: Greek-Arabic
- Found: 1975
- Now at: Saint Catherine's Monastery
- Size: 21.5 cm by 23 cm
- Type: ?
- Category: ?

Uncial 0283 (in the Gregory-Aland numbering), is a Greek uncial manuscript of the New Testament. Paleographically it has been assigned to the 9th century.

== Description ==
The codex contains some parts of the Gospel of Mark 2:21-3:18; 5:9-13.31-36; 6:9-13.39-40; 9:20-24.44-47; 14:54-62; 15:6-15, on 15 parchment leaves (21.5 cm by 23 cm). The text is written in two columns per page, 22 lines per page, in uncial letters.

Currently it is dated by the INTF to the 9th century.

== Location ==
It is one of the manuscripts discovered in Saint Catherine's Monastery at Sinai in May 1975, during restoration work. Currently the codex is housed at the St. Catherine's Monastery (N.E. ΜΓ 47) in Sinai.

== See also ==
- List of New Testament uncials
- Biblical manuscript
- Textual criticism
