= Uncial 0310 =

- New Testament manuscript
- Text: Epistle to Titus 2:15-3:6; 3:6-7
- Date: 6th-century
- Script: Greek
- Now at: Cambridge University Library
- Size: unknown
- Type: ?
- Category: ?

Uncial 0310 (in the Gregory-Aland numbering), is a Greek uncial manuscript of the New Testament. Palaeographically it has been assigned to the 6th-century.

== Description ==
The codex contains a small texts of the Epistle to Titus 2:15-3:6; 3:6-7, on a fragment of the one parchment leaf. The original size of the leaf is unknown.

It is written in two columns per page, 25 lines per page (survived only 6 lines), in uncial letters.

Currently it is dated by the INTF to the 6th-century.

It is currently housed at the Cambridge University Library (Or. 161699 Π X) in Cambridge.

== See also ==
- List of New Testament uncials
- Biblical manuscript
- Textual criticism
