= Uncial 0311 =

- New Testament manuscript
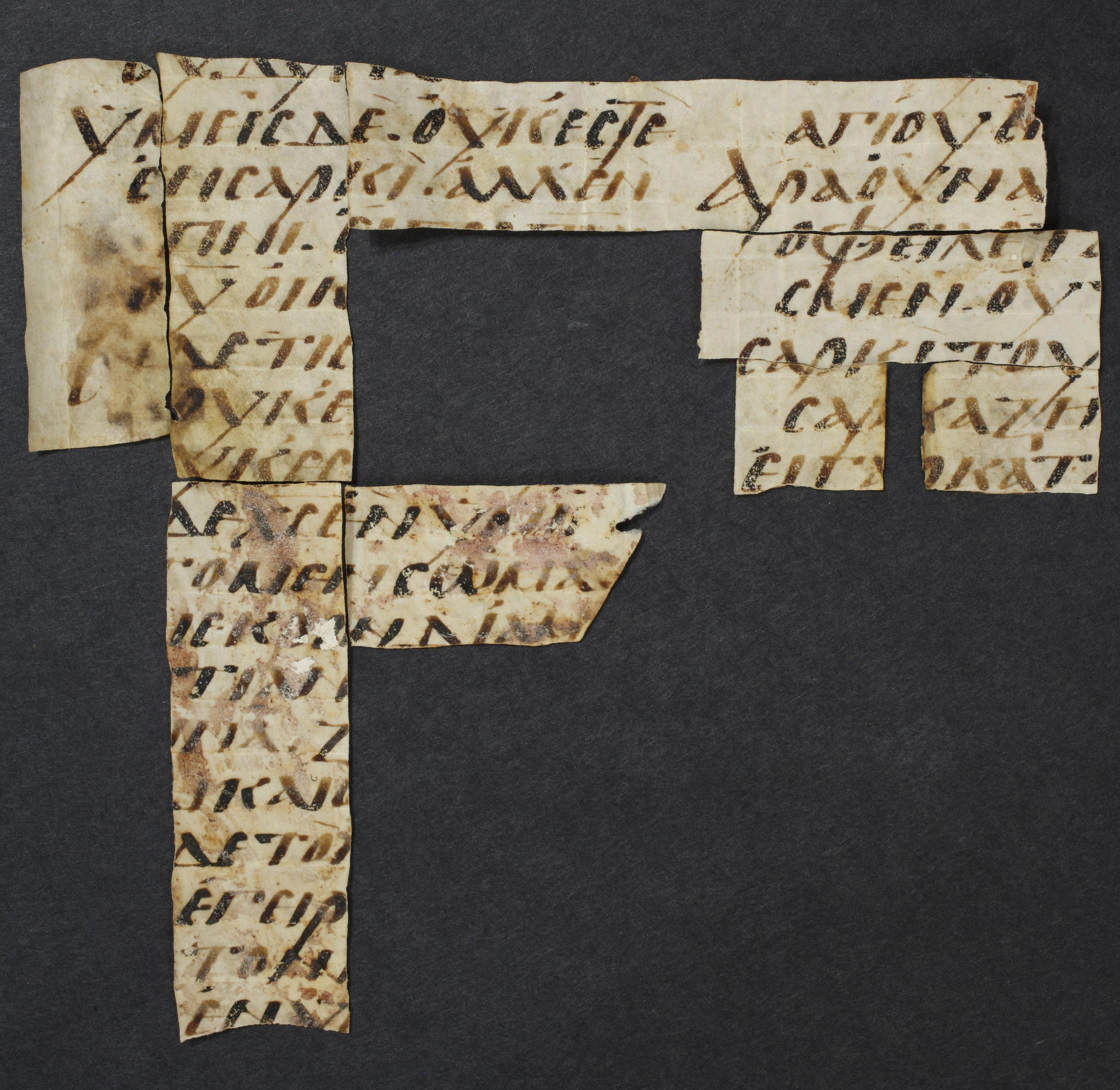
- Text: Epistle to the Romans 8:1-13
- Date: 8th/9th-century
- Script: Greek
- Now at: De Hamel Collection
- Size: 25 by 22 cm
- Type: ?
- Category: ?

Uncial 0311 (in the Gregory-Aland numbering), is a Greek uncial manuscript of the New Testament. Palaeographically it has been assigned to the 8th or the 9th-century.

== Description ==
The codex contains a small texts of the Epistle to the Romans 8:1-13, on 8 fragments of the one parchment leaf. The original size of the leaf was 25 cm by 22 cm.

It is written in two columns per page, 23 lines per page (survived only 6 lines), in large and leaned uncial letters.

Currently it is dated by the INTF to the 8th or 9th-century.

It is currently housed at the Christopher De Hamel Collection (Gk. Ms 1) in Cambridge.

== See also ==
- List of New Testament uncials
- Biblical manuscript
- Textual criticism
