= Uncial 0312 =

- New Testament manuscript
- Text: Gospel of Luke 5:23-24.30-31; 7:9.17-18
- Date: 3rd/4th-century
- Script: Greek
- Now at: Corpus Christi College, Cambridge
- Size: [12 by 10 cm]
- Type: ?
- Category: ?

Uncial 0312 (in the Gregory-Aland numbering), is a Greek uncial manuscript of the New Testament. Palaeographically it has been assigned to the 3rd or 4th-century.

== Description ==
The codex contains a small texts of the Gospel of Luke 5:23-24.30-31; 7:9.17-18, on one fragment of the one parchment leaf. The original size of the leaf was only 12 by 10 cm.

The text is written in two columns per page, probably in 27 lines per page, in small uncial letters.

Currently it is dated by the INTF to the 3rd or 4th-century.

It is currently housed at the Christopher De Hamel Collection (Gk. Ms 2) at the Corpus Christi College in Cambridge.

== See also ==
- List of New Testament uncials
- Biblical manuscript
- Textual criticism
