= Uncial 0288 =

- New Testament manuscript
- Text: Gospel of Luke 5 †
- Date: 9th century
- Script: Greek
- Found: 1975
- Now at: Saint Catherine's Monastery
- Size: 27 cm by 20.5 cm
- Type: ?
- Category: ?

Uncial 0288 (in the Gregory-Aland numbering), is a Greek uncial manuscript of the New Testament. Palaeographically it has been assigned to the 9th century.

== Description ==
The codex contains a small parts of the text of the Gospel of Luke 5:33-34.36-37; 5:39-6:1.3-4, on 2 parchment leaves (27 cm by 20.5 cm). The text is written in two columns per page, 27 lines per page, in uncial letters. The leaves have survived in a fragmentary condition.

It is a palimpsest, the upper text is in Greek written by minuscule hand, it contains part of the Old Testament.

Currently it is dated by the INTF to the 9th century.

== Location ==
It is one of the manuscripts discovered in Saint Catherine's Monastery at Sinai in May 1975, during the restoration work. Currently the codex is housed at the St. Catherine's Monastery (N.E. ΜΓ 98) in Sinai.

== See also ==
- List of New Testament uncials
- Biblical manuscript
- Textual criticism
