= Uncial 0314 =

- New Testament manuscript
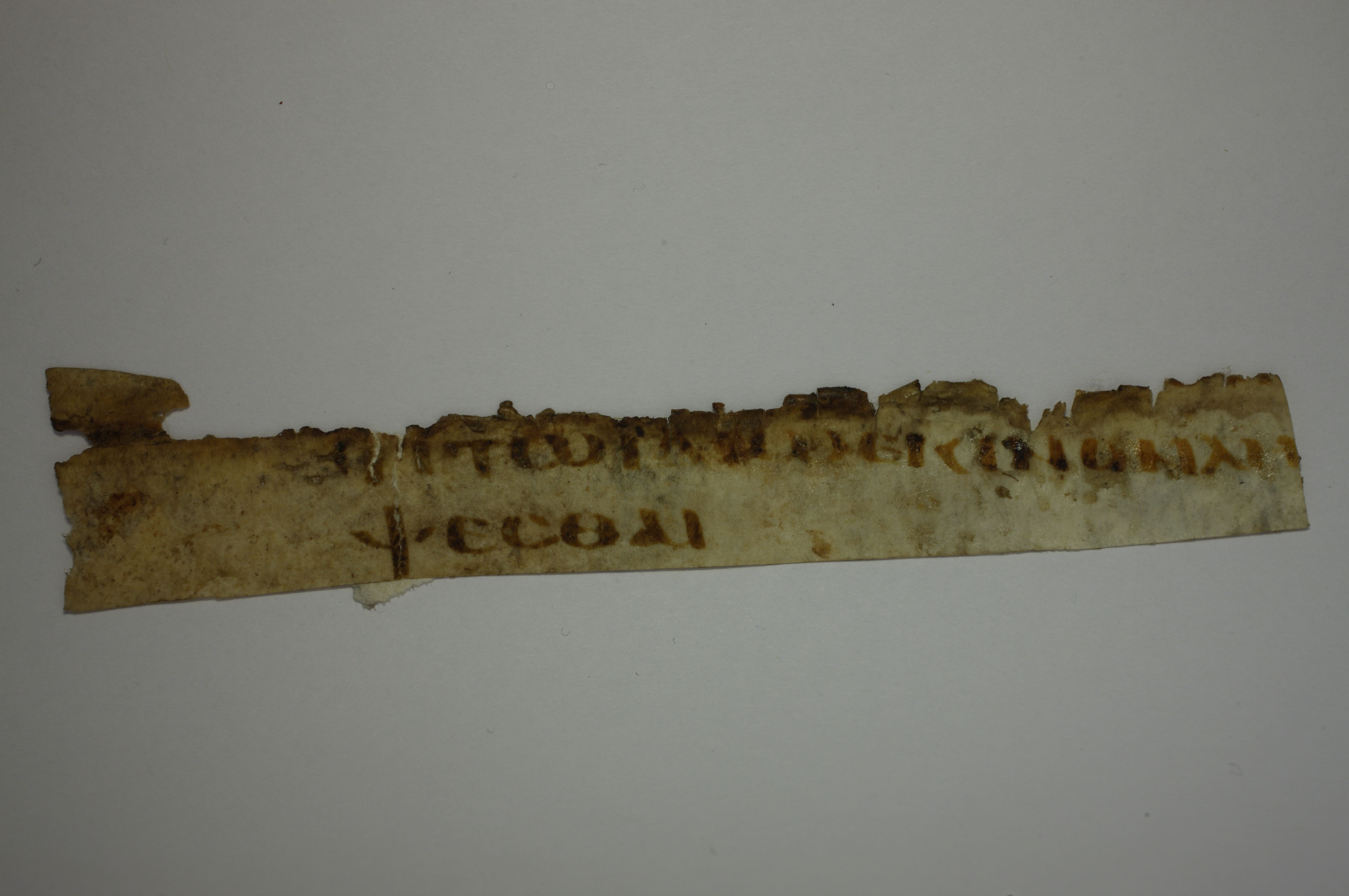
- side recto
- Text: Gospel of John 5:43
- Date: 6th-century
- Script: Greek
- Now at: Cambridge
- Size: [10 by 2 cm]
- Type: ?
- Category: ?

Uncial 0314 (in the Gregory-Aland numbering), is a Greek uncial manuscript of the New Testament. Palaeographically it has been assigned to the 6th-century. The manuscript has survived in very fragmentary condition.

== Description ==
The codex contains a small text of the Gospel of John 5:43, on one fragment of the parchment leaf. The original size of the leaf is unknown the survived fragment has only 10 by 2 cm. The fragment contains only 33 letters.

Currently it is dated by the INTF to the 6th century.

The text is written in one column per page, original number of lines is unknown, the survived fragment has only two lines. The writing is visible on one side only. This fragment was identified by D. Jongkind. The writing is very thick and rounded.

It has error of itacism (ε → αι).

Text

ΤΙ ΤΩ ΟΝΟΜΑΤΙ ΤΩ ΙΔΙΩ ΕΚΕΙΝΟΝ ΛΗΜΨΕΣΘΑΙ

Location

It is currently housed at the Christopher De Hamel Collection (Gk. Ms 4) in Cambridge.

== See also ==
- List of New Testament uncials
- Biblical manuscript
- Textual criticism
