= List of New Testament uncials =

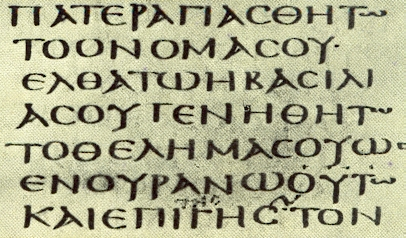
Codex Sinaiticus, Luke 11:2

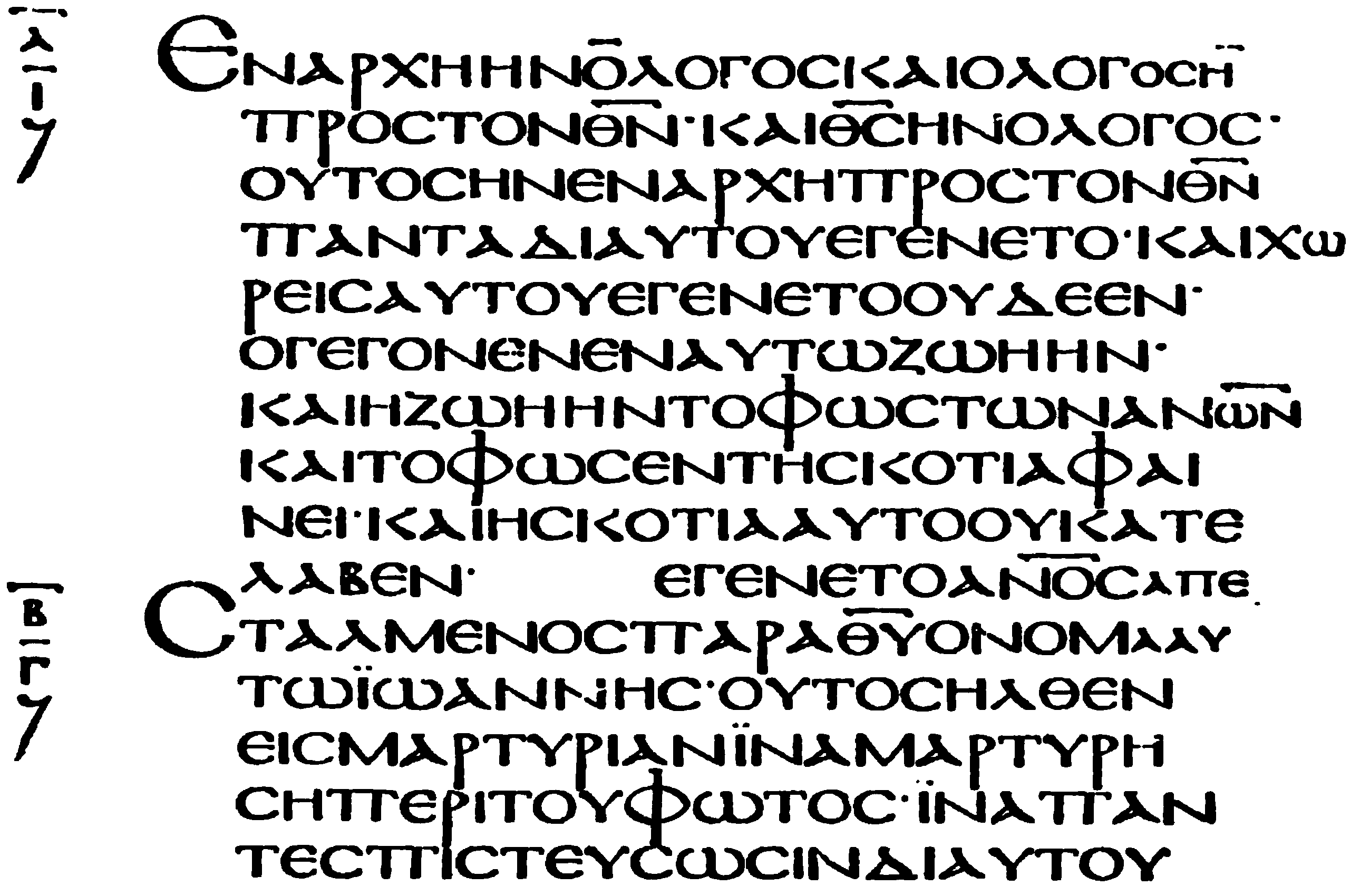
Codex Alexandrinus, John 1:1–7

A New Testament uncial is a section of the New Testament in Greek or Latin majuscule letters, written on parchment or vellum. This style of writing is called Biblical Uncial or Biblical Majuscule.

New Testament uncials are distinct from other ancient texts based on the following differences:

- New Testament papyri – written on papyrus and generally more ancient
- New Testament minuscules – written in minuscule letters and generally more recent
- New Testament lectionaries – usually written in minuscule (but some in uncial) letters and generally more recent
- New Testament uncials – written in majuscule letters, on parchment or vellum.

== Classification of uncials ==
In 1751, New Testament theologian Johann Jakob Wettstein knew of only 23 uncial codices of the New Testament. By 1859, Constantin von Tischendorf had increased that number to 64 uncials, and in 1909 Caspar René Gregory enumerated 161 uncial codices. By 1963, Kurt Aland, in his Kurzgefasste Liste, had enumerated 250, then in 1989, finally, 299 uncials.

Wettstein inaugurated the modern method of classification. He used capital Latin letters to identify the uncials. Codex Alexandrinus received the letter "A", Codex Vaticanus – "B", Codex Ephraemi – "C", Codex Bezae – "D", until he arrived at the last letter used by him, "O". Succeeding generations used this pattern, but newly discovered manuscripts soon exhausted the Latin alphabet. As a result, letters of the Greek and Hebrew alphabets began to be used. Tischendorf, for example, assigned the Codex Sinaiticus the Hebrew letter א. Uncial 047 received siglum ב^{1}, Uncial 048 received ב^{2}, Uncial 075 received ג, Codex Macedoniensis – ו, to name a few. When Greek and Hebrew letters ran out, Gregory assigned uncials numerals with an initial 0 (to distinguish them from the symbols of minuscule manuscripts). Codex Sinaiticus received the number 01, Alexandrinus – 02, Vaticanus – 03, Ephraemi – 04, etc. The last uncial manuscript known by Gregory received number 0161. Ernst von Dobschütz expanded the list of uncials through 0208 in 1933.

As of 2012 over 320 sigla for uncial codices have been catalogued by the Institute for New Testament Textual Research (INTF) in Münster, Germany.

However, the 322 currently catalogued does not provide a precise count of all the New Testament Greek uncials. Uncial 0168 has been lost and over thirty manuscripts are associated with a smaller set of designations. (Note: 074, 084, 090, 0110, 0112, 0113, 0117, 0119, 0123, 0124, 0125, 0137, 0138, 0139, 0149, 0179, 0180, 0190, 0191, 0193, 0194, 0195, 0202, 0215, 0224, 0235, 0285, 0293.) Sometimes one number also applies to two separate manuscripts, as with uncial 092a and 092b, 0121a and 0121b, and 0278a and 0278b. Some other numerical designations should be reallocated to other lists: 055 (commentary), 0100 (lectionary), 0129 (lectionary), 0152 (talisman), 0153 (ostracon), 0192 (lectionary), 0195 (lectionary), 0203 (lectionary). Uncial 0212 from the 3rd or 4th century is more properly a witness to the Diatessaron than to the New Testament itself. So, the number 322 is merely nominal; the actual figure should be somewhat lower. Conversely, minuscule 1143, known as Beratinus 2, has some parts that were written in semi-uncial letters.

== Legend ==
- The numbers (#) are the now standard system of Gregory-Aland.
- Dates are estimated palaeographically by the INTF (except Codex Vaticanus 354 where the scribe gave a date — 949).
- Content generally only describes sections of the New Testament: Gospels (Gosp), The Acts of the Apostles (Acts), Pauline Epistles (Paul), Catholic epistles (CE), and so on. Sometimes the surviving portion of a codex is so limited that specific books, chapters or even verses can be indicated. Linked articles, where they exist, generally specify content in detail, by verse.
- Digital images are referenced with direct links to the hosting web pages, with the exception of those at the INTF. The quality and accessibility of the images is as follows:

Gold color indicates high resolution color images available online.
Tan color indicates high resolution color images available locally, not online.
Light tan color indicates only a small fraction of manuscript pages with color images available online.
Light gray color indicates black/white or microfilm images available online.
Light blue color indicates manuscript not imaged, and is currently lost or ownership unknown.
Light pink color indicates manuscript destroyed, presumed destroyed, or deemed too fragile to digitize.
Violet color indicates high resolution ultraviolet images available online.

† Indicates the manuscript has damaged or missing pages.
^{K} Indicates manuscript also includes a commentary.
[ ] Brackets around Gregory-Aland number indicate the manuscript belongs to an already numbered manuscript, was found to not be a continuous text manuscript, is destroyed or presumed destroyed.

== List of all registered New Testament uncial codices ==
Only one uncial, Codex Sinaiticus has a complete text of the New Testament. Codex Alexandrinus has an almost complete text. It contains all books of the New Testament but lacks some leaves of Matthew (25), John (2), and Second Corinthians (3). Codex Vaticanus lacks the four last books, and the Epistle to the Hebrews is not complete. Codex Ephraemi has approximately 66 per cent of the New Testament. Uncials with designations higher than 046 typically have only one or two leaves.

=== Uncials with sigla ===
The first 45 uncials have been assigned descriptive names as well as a single letter code called a siglum, for usage in academic writing. Beginning with uncial 046 the assignment of sigla was dropped and only a few manuscripts thereafter received a descriptive name.

#	Sign	Name	Date	Content	Pages	Institution	City	Country	Images
01	א	Sinaiticus	4th	New Testament	148	British Library, Add. 43725	London	United Kingdom	CS, INTF
01	א	Sinaiticus	4th	New Testament	148	British Library, Add. 43725	London	United Kingdom	BL
01	א	Sinaiticus	4th	New Testament	148	British Library, Add. 43725	London	United Kingdom	CSNTM
02	A	Alexandrinus	5th	New Testament†	144	British Library, Royal 1 D. VIII	London	United Kingdom	BL
02	A	Alexandrinus	5th	New Testament†	144	British Library, Royal 1 D. VIII	London	United Kingdom	CSNTM, INTF
03	B	Vaticanus	4th	Gospels, Acts, General Epistles, Pauline Epistles† (lacking 1 Timothy–Philemon)	142	Vatican Library, Gr. 1209, p. 1235-1518	Vatican City	Vatican	DVL, INTF
03	B	Vaticanus	4th	Gospels, Acts, General Epistles, Pauline Epistles† (lacking 1 Timothy–Philemon)	142	Vatican Library, Gr. 1209, p. 1235-1518	Vatican City	Vatican	CSNTM
04	C	Ephraemi Rescriptus	5th	New Testament†	145	National Library, Gr. 9	Paris	France	BnF, INTF, CSNTM
05	D^{ea}	Bezae	5th	Gospels†, Acts†	415	University Library, Nn. 2. 41	Cambridge	United Kingdom	CUL, INTF, CSNTM
06	D^{p}	Claromontanus	6th	Pauline epistles† (lacking Romans 1:1-7)	533	National Library, Gr. 107 AB	Paris	France	BnF, INTF, CSNTM
07	E^{e}	Basilensis	8th	Gospels†	318	University of Basel, AN III 12 (fol. 97v, 248r: 2087)	Basel	Switzerland	INTF
07	E^{e}	Basilensis	8th	Gospels†	318	University of Basel, AN III 12 (fol. 97v, 248r: 2087)	Basel	Switzerland	CSNTM
08	E^{a}	Laudianus	6th	Acts†	227	Bodleian Library, Laud. Gr. 35	Oxford	United Kingdom	DB
08	E^{a}	Laudianus	6th	Acts†	227	Bodleian Library, Laud. Gr. 35	Oxford	United Kingdom	CSNTM, INTF
09	F^{e}	Boreelianus	9th	Gospels†	204	Utrecht University, Ms. 1	Utrecht	Netherlands	UU, INTF, CSNTM
010	F^{p}	Augiensis	9th	Pauline epistles† (lacking Romans 1:1-3:19, 1 Cor. 3:8-16, 6:7-14, Col. 2:1-8, Philem. 21–25, Hebrews)	136	Trinity College, B.17.1	Cambridge	United Kingdom	TC
010	F^{p}	Augiensis	9th	Pauline epistles† (lacking Romans 1:1-3:19, 1 Cor. 3:8-16, 6:7-14, Col. 2:1-8, Philem. 21–25, Hebrews)	136	Trinity College, B.17.1	Cambridge	United Kingdom	CSNTM, INTF
011	G^{e}	Seidelianus I	9th	Gospels†	251	British Library, Harley 5684	London	United Kingdom	BL
011	G^{e}	Seidelianus I	9th	Gospels†	251	British Library, Harley 5684	London	United Kingdom	CSNTM, INTF
012	G^{p}	Boernerianus	9th	Pauline epistles† (lacking Romans 1:1-4, 2:17-24, 1 Cor. 3:8-16, 6:7-14, Col. 2:1-8, Philem. 21–25, Hebrews)	99	Saxon State Library, A 145b	Dresden	Germany	SSL
012	G^{p}	Boernerianus	9th	Pauline epistles† (lacking Romans 1:1-4, 2:17-24, 1 Cor. 3:8-16, 6:7-14, Col. 2:1-8, Philem. 21–25, Hebrews)	99	Saxon State Library, A 145b	Dresden	Germany	CSNTM, INTF
013	H^{e}	Seidelianus II	9th	Gospels†	193	State and University Library, Codex 91	Hamburg	Germany	INTF
013	H^{e}	Seidelianus II	9th	Gospels†	1	Trinity College, B.17.20, 21	Cambridge	United Kingdom	TC
014	H^{a}	Mutinensis	9th	Acts†	43	Biblioteca Estense, G. 196, a.V.6.3 (II G 3)	Modena	Italy	CSNTM, INTF
015	H^{p}	Coislinianus	6th	Galatians 4:30-5:5; Colossians 1:26-2:8, 2:20-3:4; Hebrews 12:10-15, 13:24-25; 1 Timothy 1:7-2:13	10	National Library, Supplément grec 1074	Paris	France	BnF, INTF, CSNTM
015	H^{p}	Coislinianus	6th	1 Corinthians 10:22-29, 11:9-16; Hebrews 2:11-16, 3:13-18, 4:12-15; 1 Timothy 3:7-13; Titus 1:1-3, 1:15-2:5, 3;13-15	12	National Library, Coislin 202	Paris	France	BnF, INTF, CSNTM
015	H^{p}	Coislinianus	6th	2 Corinthians 10:8-12, 10:18-11:6, 11:12-12:2; Galatians 1:1-4, 2:14-17	8	Great Lavra Monastery	Mount Athos	Greece	INTF, CSNTM
015	H^{p}	Coislinianus	6th	1 Timothy 6:9-13; 2 Timothy 2:1-9	2	Turin National University Library, A.1	Turin	Italy	INTF, CSNTM
015	H^{p}	Coislinianus	6th	Hebrews 1:3-8	1	Russian State Library, F.270. 1a.70.1 (Gr. 166,1)	Moscow	Russia	INTF
015	H^{p}	Coislinianus	6th	Hebrews 10:1-7, 10:32-38	2	State Historical Museum, 563	Moscow	Russia	INTF
015	H^{p}	Coislinianus	6th	Galatians 1:4-9, 2:9-14; Colossians 3:4-11	3	National Library of Russia, Gr. 14	Saint Petersburg	Russia	INTF, CSNTM
015	H^{p}	Coislinianus	6th	2 Corinthians 4:2-7; 1 Thessalonians 2:9-13, 4:5-11	3	Vernadsky National Library of Ukraine, F. 301 (KDA), 26p	Kyiv	Ukraine	INTF
016	I	Freerianus	5th	1 Corinthians 10:29, 11:9-10, 18–19, 26–27, 12:3-4, 27–28, 14:12-13, 22, 32–33, 15:3, 15, 27–28, 38–39, 59–50, 16:1-2, 12–13; 2 Corinthians 1:1, 9, 16–17, 2:3-4, 14, 3:6-7, 16–17, 4:6-7, 16–17, 5:8-10, 17–18, 6:6-8, 16–18, 7:7-8, 13–14, 8:6-7, 14–17, 8:24-9:1, 9:7-8, 9:15-10:1, 10:8-10, 10:17-11:2, 11:9-10, 20–21, 28–29, 12:6-7, 14–15, 13:1-2, 10–11; Galatians 1:1-3, 11–13, 1:22-2:1, 2:8-9, 16–17, 3:6-8, 16–17, 24–28, 4:8-10, 20–23; Ephesians 2:15-18, 3:6-8, 18–20, 4:9-11, 17–19, 28–30, 5:6-11, 20–24, 5:32-6:1, 6:10-12, 19–21; Philippians 1:1-4, 11–13, 20–23, 2:1-3, 12–14, 25–27, 3:4-6, 14–17, 4:3-6, 13–15; Colossians 1:1-4, 10–12, 20–22, 27–29, 2:7-9, 16–19, 3:5-8, 15–17, 3:25-4:2, 4:11-13; 1 Thessalonians 1:1-2, 9–10, 2:7-9, 14–16, 3:2-5, 11–13, 4:7-10, 4:16-5:1, 5:9-12, 23–27; 2 Thessalonians 1:1-3, 10–11, 2:5-8, 14–17, 3:8-10; 1 Timothy 1:1-3, 10–13, 1:19-2:1, 2:9-13, 3:7-9, 4:1-3, 10–13, 5:5-9, 16–19, 6:1-2, 9–11, 17–19; 2 Timothy 1:1-3, 10–12, 2:2-5, 14–16, 22–24, 3:6-8, 3:16-4:1, 4:8-10, 18–20; Titus 1:1-3, 10–11, 2:4-6, 14–15, 3:8-9; Philemon 1–3, 14–16; Hebrews 1:1-3, 9–12, 2:4-7, 12–14, 3:4-6, 14–16, 4:3-6, 12–14, 5:5-7, 6:1-3, 10–13, 6:20-7:2, 7:7-11, 18–20, 7:27-8:1, 8:7-9, 9:1-4, 9–11, 16–19, 25–27, 10:5-8, 16–18, 26–29, 35–38, 11:6-7, 12–15, 22–24, 31–33, 11:38-12:1, 12:7-9, 16–18, 25–27, 13:7-9, 16–18, 23–25.	84	Smithsonian Institution, Freer Gallery of Art, 06. 275	Washington, D.C.	United States	FGOA
017	K^{e}	Cyprius	9th	Gospels	267	National Library, Gr. 63	Paris	France	BnF, INTF, CSNTM
018	K^{ap}	Mosquensis	9th	Pauline Epistles^{K}†(lacking Rom. 10:18—1 Cor. 6:13; 1 Cor. 8:8-11), General Epistles^{K}	288	State Historical Museum, V. 93, S. 97	Moscow	Russia	CSNTM, INTF
019	L^{e}	Regius	8th	Gospels†	257	National Library, Gr. 62	Paris	France	BnF, INTF, CSNTM
020	L^{ap}	Angelicus	9th	Acts† 8:10-28:31, General Epistles, Romans - Hebrews 12:28†	189	Biblioteca Angelica, Ang. gr. 39	Rome	Italy	BA
020	L^{ap}	Angelicus	9th	Acts† 8:10-28:31, General Epistles, Romans - Hebrews 12:28†	189	Biblioteca Angelica, Ang. gr. 39	Rome	Italy	CSNTM, INTF
021	M	Campianus	9th	Gospels	257	National Library, Gr. 48	Paris	France	BnF, INTF, CSNTM
022	N	Petropolitanus Purp.	6th	Gospels†	182	National Library of Russia, Gr. 537	Saint Petersburg	Russia	INTF
022	N	Petropolitanus Purp.	6th	Matthew 19:6-13, 20:6-22, 20:29-21:17	6	Vatican Library, Vat. gr. 2305	Vatican City	Vatican City	DVL
022	N	Petropolitanus Purp.	6th	Mark 6:53-15:23	33	Monastery of Saint John the Theologian, 67	Patmos	Greece	INTF
022	N	Petropolitanus Purp.	6th	Matthew 14:22-31	1	Byzantine Museum, Frg 21	Athens	Greece	CSNTM
022	N	Petropolitanus Purp.	6th	John 6:31-39	1	Byzantine Museum, Byz. Ms. 1	Thessaloniki	Greece	INTF
022	N	Petropolitanus Purp.	6th	Matthew 26:57-65, 27:26-34; John 14:2-10, 15:15-22	4	British Library, Cotton. Tit. C.XV	London	United Kingdom	BL
022	N	Petropolitanus Purp.	6th	John 3:14-21	1	Castello, Marchese A. Spinola	Lerma	Italy	INTF
022	N	Petropolitanus Purp.	6th	Luke 24:13-21, 24:39-49	2	National Library of Austria, Theol. gr. 31	Vienna	Austria	INTF
022	N	Petropolitanus Purp.	6th	Matthew 15:38-16:7	1	Morgan Library & Museum, 874	New York, NY	United States	INTF
023	O	Sinopensis	6th	Gospel of Matthew†	44	National Library, Suppl. Gr. 1286	Paris	France	BnF, INTF
024	P^{e}	Guelferbytanus A	6th	Gospels†	44	Herzog August Bibliothek, codices Weißenburg 64	Wolfenbüttel	Germany	INTF
025	P^{apr}	Porphyrianus	9th	Acts† (lacking Acts 1:1–2:13), Pauline Epistles† (lacking Romans 2:16–3:4; 8:32–9:10; 11:23–12:1; 1 Cor. 7:15–17; 12:23–13:5; 14:23–39; 2 Cor. 2:13–16; Col. 3:16–4:8; 1 Thes. 3:5–4:17), General Epistles† (lacking 1 John 3:20–5:1; Jude 4–15), Revelation† (lacking Rev. 16:12–17:1; 19:21–20:9; 22:6–end).	327	National Library of Russia, Gr. 225	Saint Petersburg	Russia	
026	Q	Guelferbytanus B	5th	Luke†, John†	13	Herzog August Bibliothek, codices Weißenburg 64	Wolfenbüttel	Germany	INTF
027	R	Nitriensis	6th	Gospel of Luke†	48	British Library, Add. 17211	London	United Kingdom	BL
027	R	Nitriensis	6th	Gospel of Luke†	48	British Library, Add. 17211	London	United Kingdom	INTF
028	S	Vaticanus 354	949	Gospels	235	Vatican Library, Vat. Gr. 354	Vatican City	Vatican City	DVL
028	S	Vaticanus 354	949	Gospels	235	Vatican Library, Vat. Gr. 354	Vatican City	Vatican City	INTF
029 = [0113], [0125], [0139]	T	Borgianus	5th	John†	8	Vatican Library, Borg. copt. 109 (Cass 18, 65)	Vatican City	Vatican City	DVL
029 = [0113], [0125], [0139]	T	Borgianus	5th	John†	13	Vatican Library, Borg. copt. 109 (Cass 7, 65,2)	Vatican City	Vatican City	INTF
029 = [0113], [0125], [0139]	T	Borgianus	5th	Luke 18:10-16, 18:32-41	2	Morgan Library & Museum, M 664A	New York, NY	United States	INTF
029 = [0113], [0125], [0139]	T	Borgianus	5th	Luke 6:18-26, 18:2-9, 18:42-19-8, 21:33-22:3, 22:20-23:20, 24:25-27, 24:29-31	5	National Library, Copt. 129,7, fol. 35.; 129,8, fol. 121–122, 140-157	Paris	France	INTF
029 = [0113], [0125], [0139]	T	Borgianus	5th	Luke 21:36, 22:1-22; John 1:24-32, 3:10-17	3	National Library, Copt. 129,9, fol. 49.65; 129,10, fol. 209	Paris	France	INTF
029 = [0113], [0125], [0139]	T	Borgianus	5th	John 4:52-5:7	1	National Library, Copt. 129,9, fol. 76	Paris	France	INTF
030	U	Nanianus	9th	Gospels	380	Biblioteca Marciana, Gr. 1,8 (1397)	Venice	Italy	INTF
031	V	Mosquensis II	9th	Gospels†	220	State Historical Museum, V. 9, S. 399	Moscow	Russia	INTF
032	W	Washingtonianus	5th	Gospels†	187	Smithsonian Institution, Freer Gallery of Art 06. 274	Washington, D.C.	United States	INTF, CSNTM
032	W	Washingtonianus	5th	Gospels†	187	Smithsonian Institution, Freer Gallery of Art 06. 274	Washington, D.C.	United States	FGOA
033	X	Monacensis	10th	Gospels^{K}†	160	LMU Munich University Library, 2° codex manuscript 30	Munich	Germany	INTF, CSNTM
034	Y	Macedoniensis	9th	Gospels†	309	Cambridge University Library, MS Add. 6594	Cambridge	United Kingdom	CUL
034	Y	Macedoniensis	9th	Gospels†	309	Cambridge University Library, MS Add. 6594	Cambridge	United Kingdom	INTF, CSNTM
035	Z	Dublinensis	6th	Matthew†	32	Trinity College, Ms. 32	Dublin	Ireland	TCD
035	Z	Dublinensis	6th	Matthew†	32	Trinity College, Ms. 32	Dublin	Ireland	INTF, CSNTM
036	Γ	Tischendorfianus IV	10th	Gospels†	158	Bodleian Library, Auct. T. inf. 2.2	Oxford	United Kingdom	INTF
036	Γ	Tischendorfianus IV	10th	Gospels†	158	Bodleian Library, Auct. T. inf. 2.2	Oxford	United Kingdom	BL
036	Γ	Tischendorfianus IV	10th	Gospels†	99	National Library of Russia, Gr 33	Saint Petersburg	Russia	INTF
037	Δ	Sangallensis	9th	Gospels	198	Abbey library of Saint Gall 48	St. Gallen	Switzerland	e-codices, CSNTM, INTF
038	Θ	Coridethianus	9th	Gospels	248	Georgian National Center of Manuscripts, Gr. 28	Tbilisi	Georgia	INTF
038	Θ	Coridethianus	9th	Gospels	248	Georgian National Center of Manuscripts, Gr. 28	Tbilisi	Georgia	CSNTM
039	Λ	Tischendorfianus III	9th	Luke, John	157	Bodleian Library, Auct. T. inf. 1.1	Oxford	United Kingdom	INTF
039	Λ	Tischendorfianus III	9th	Luke, John	157	Bodleian Library, Auct. T. inf. 1.1	Oxford	United Kingdom	BL
040	Ξ	Zacynthius	6th	Luke^{K}†	89	Cambridge University Library	Cambridge	United Kingdom	INTF, CSNTM
041	Π	Petropolitanus	9th	Gospels†	350	National Library of Russia, Gr. 34	Saint Petersburg	Russia	INTF
042	Σ	Rossanensis	6th	Matthew, Mark	188	Diocesan Museum, Cathedral	Rossano	Italy	INTF
043	Φ	Beratinus	6th	Matthew, Mark	197	National Archives of Albania, Nr. 1	Tirana	Albania	CSNTM, INTF
044	Ψ	Athous Lavrensis	9th/10th	Gospels† (lacking Matthew 1:1-Mark 9:5), Acts, Pauline Epistles† (lacking Hebrews 8:11-9:19), General Epistles	261	Great Lavra Monastery, B΄ 52	Mount Athos	Greece	INTF, CSNTM
045	Ω	Athous Dionysiou	9th	Gospels	259	Dionysiou Monastery, 10	Mount Athos	Greece	INTF, CSNTM

=== Uncials 046-0100 ===
Beginning with 046, the use of identifying sigla was dropped, and very few uncials were given identifying names.

#	Date	Content	Pages	Institution	City	Country	Images
046	10th	Revelation	20	Vatican Library, Vat. gr. 2066, fol. 249–268	Vatican City	Vatican City	DVL
046	10th	Revelation	20	Vatican Library, Vat. gr. 2066, fol. 249–268	Vatican City	Vatican City	INTF
047	8th	Gospels†	152	Princeton University Library, Garrett 1	Princeton, NJ	United States	INTF
048	5th	Acts 26:6-27:4, 28:3-31; James 4:14-5:20; 1 Peter 1:1-12; 2 Peter 2:4-8, 2:13-3:15; 1 John 4:6-5:13, 5:17-18,5:21; 2 John; 3 John; Romans 13:4-15:9; 1 Corinthians 2:1-3:11, 3:22, 4:4-6,5:5-11, 6:3-11,12:23-15:17, 15:20-27; 2 Corinthians 4:7-6:8, 8:9-18,8:21-10:6; Ephesians 5:8-end; Philippians 1:8-23, 2:1-4, 2:6-8; Colossians 1:2-2:8, 2:11-14, 22–23,3:7-8, 3:12-4:18; 1 Thessalonians 1:1, 5–6, 1 Timothy 5:6-6:17, 6:20-21, 2 Timothy 1:4-6, 1:8, 2:2-25; Titus 3:13-end; Philemon; Hebrews 11:32-13:4.	21	Vatican Library, Vat. Gr. 2061, fol. 198–199, 221–222, 229–230, 293–303, 305–308	Vatican City	Vatican City	DVL, INTF, CSNTM, MSU
049	9th	Acts, General Epistles, Pauline Epistles† (Romans; 1 Cor 1:1-5:8; 13:8-16:24; 2 Cor 1:1-11:23; Eph 4:20-6:20)	149	Great Lavra Monastery, A' 88	Mount Athos	Greece	INTF, CSNTM
050	9th	John 3:12-13, 3:20-22	2	National Library, 1371	Athens	Greece	CSNTM
050	9th	John 2:17-3:8	8	Dionysiou Monastery, 71	Mount Athos	Greece	INTF
050	9th	John 1:1, 1:3-4, 20:10-13, 20:15-17	7	State Historical Museum, V.29, S. 119	Moscow	Russia	INTF
050	9th	John 4:7-14	3	Christ Church, Wake 2	Oxford	United Kingdom	INTF
051	10th	Revelation 11:15-13:1, 13:3-22:7, 22:15-21	92	Pantokratoros Monastery, 44	Mount Athos	Greece	INTF, CSNTM
052	10th	Revelation 7:16-8:12	4	St. Panteleimon Monastery, 99,2	Mount Athos	Greece	INTF
053	9th	Luke 1:1-2-40	14	Bavarian State Library, Cod. Graec. 208, fol. 235-248 (fol. 107-234: 2768)	Munich	Germany	BSB, INTF
054	8th	John 16:13-19:41	6	Vatican Library, Barb. Gr. 521, fol. 1–6	Vatican City	Vatican City	INTF
055	11th	Commentary on the Gospels	303	National Library, Gr. 201	Paris	France	BnF, INTF, CSNTM
056	10th	Acts^{K}, General Epistles^{K}, Pauline Epistles^{K}	381	National Library, Coislin, Gr. 26	Paris	France	BnF, INTF, CSNTM
057	4th/5th	Acts 3:5-6, 3:10-12	1	Berlin State Museums, P. 9808	Berlin	Germany	BerlPap, INTF, CSNTM
058	4th	Matthew 18:18-19, 18:22-23, 18:25-26, 18:28-29	1	Austrian National Library, Pap. G. 39782	Vienna	Austria	INTF
059=[0215]	4th/5th	Mark 15:20-21,26-27 ^{[0215]}; Mark 15:29-38	2	Austrian National Library, Pap. G. 39779, Pap. G. 36112	Vienna	Austria	CSNTM
060	6th	John 14:14-17, 19–21, 23–24, 26–28	1	Berlin State Museums, P. 5877	Berlin	Germany	BerlPap, INTF, CSNTM
060	6th	John 14:14-17, 19–21, 23–24, 26–28	1	Berlin State Museums, P. 5877	Berlin	Germany	CSNTM
061	5th	1 Timothy 3:15-16, 4:1-3, 6:2-4, 5–8	2	Louvre Ms. E. 7332	Paris	France	INTF
062	5th	Galatians 4:15-5:14	1	Owner Unknown			INTF
063=[0117]	9th	Luke 16:19-17, 29; 18:36-19:44	4	State Historical Museum, V. 137, S. 39, fol. 1-4	Moscow	Russia	INTF
063=[0117]	9th	Luke 17:29-18:14; 20:43-21:20; 23:7-30; 23:54-24:20; 24:41-53; John 1:1-3,34; 4:45-6:29	14	Vatopedi Monastery, 1219, fol. 40–52.63	Mount Athos	Greece	INTF
063=[0117]	9th	Luke 20:19-23,36-43; 23:31-54 ^{[0117]}	2	National Library Supplément grec 1155, II, fol. 3.4	Paris	France	BnF, INTF, CSNTM
063=[0117]	9th	Luke 22:6-30; 22:53-23:7	2	State Historical Museum, V. 181, S. 350, fol. 1.167	Moscow	Russia	INTF
064=[074], [090]	6th	Matthew 25:15-26:3, 17–39; 28:11-20; Mark 1:11-22, 2:21-3:3, 27-4:4, 5:9-20	10	Saint Catherine's Monastery, Harris 10	Sinai	Egypt	INTF
064=[074], [090]	6th	Matthew 26:59-70, 27:44-56; Mark 1:34-2:12	4	National Library of Russia, Gr. 276	Saint Petersburg	Russia	INTF
064=[074], [090]	6th	Matthew 27:7-30	2	Verdansky National Library, Petrov 17	Kyiv	Ukraine	INTF
065	6th	John 11:50-12:9, 15:12-16:2, 19:11-24	3	National Library of Russia, Gr. 6 I, fol. 1–3	Saint Petersburg	Russia	INTF
066	6th	Acts 28:8-17	1	National Library of Russia, Gr. 6 II, fol. 4	Saint Petersburg	Russia	INTF, CSNTM
067	6th	Matthew 14:13-16, 19–23, and Mark 14:58-64, 65–70	6	National Library of Russia, Gr. 6 III, fol. 8–9	Saint Petersburg	Russia	INTF
068	5th	John 13:16-17, 19–20, 23–24, 26–27, 16:7-9, 12–13, 15–16, 18–19	2	British Library, Add. 17136, fol. 117.126	London	United Kingdom	INTF
069	5th	Mark 10:50-51, 11:11-12	1	University of Chicago Library, Oriental Institute Orient. Inst. 2057 (P. Oxy. 3)	Chicago	United States	TUOCL
069	5th	Mark 10:50-51, 11:11-12	1	University of Chicago Library, Oriental Institute Orient. Inst. 2057 (P. Oxy. 3)	Chicago	United States	INTF, CSNTM
070= [0110], [0124], [0178], [0179], [0180], [0190], [0191], [0193], [0194], [0202]	6th	Luke 3:19-30 ^{[0124(part)]}	1	National Library of France Copt. 129,7 fol.14	Paris	France	INTF
070= [0110], [0124], [0178], [0179], [0180], [0190], [0191], [0193], [0194], [0202]	6th	Luke 8:13-19; 8:55-9:9 ^{[0202]}	2	British Library, Or. 3570 B [29] fol. 46–47	London	United Kingdom	INTF
070= [0110], [0124], [0178], [0179], [0180], [0190], [0191], [0193], [0194], [0202]	6th	Luke 9:12-16	1	Louvre E. 10.092 k (Abb, S. 74–75)	Paris	France	Facsimile INTF
070= [0110], [0124], [0178], [0179], [0180], [0190], [0191], [0193], [0194], [0202]	6th	Luke 10:21-30 ^{[0124(part)]}	1	National Library of France Copt. 129,7 fol.72	Paris	France	INTF
070= [0110], [0124], [0178], [0179], [0180], [0190], [0191], [0193], [0194], [0202]	6th	Luke 10:30-39 ^{[0190]}	1	Austrian National Library Pap. K. 9001	Vienna	Austria	CSNTM
070= [0110], [0124], [0178], [0179], [0180], [0190], [0191], [0193], [0194], [0202]	6th	Luke 10:41-11:6	1	Louvre 10.014 (Abb. S. 78–79)	Paris	France	
070= [0110], [0124], [0178], [0179], [0180], [0190], [0191], [0193], [0194], [0202]	6th	Luke 11:24-42 ^{[0124(part)]}	2	National Library of France Copt. 129,8 fol.89-90	Paris	France	INTF
070= [0110], [0124], [0178], [0179], [0180], [0190], [0191], [0193], [0194], [0202]	6th	Luke 12:5-14 ^{[0191]}	1	Austrian National Library Pap. K. 9031	Vienna	Austria	CSNTM
070= [0110], [0124], [0178], [0179], [0180], [0190], [0191], [0193], [0194], [0202]	6th	Luke 12:15-13:32	8	Clarendon Press, b. 2, fol. 12–19	Oxford	United Kingdom	INTF
070= [0110], [0124], [0178], [0179], [0180], [0190], [0191], [0193], [0194], [0202]	6th	Luke 16:4-12 ^{[0178]}	1	Austrian National Library Pap. K. 2699	Vienna	Austria	CSNTM
070= [0110], [0124], [0178], [0179], [0180], [0190], [0191], [0193], [0194], [0202]	6th	Luke 21:30-22:2 ^{[0179]}	1	Austrian National Library Pap. K. 2700	Vienna	Austria	CSNTM
070= [0110], [0124], [0178], [0179], [0180], [0190], [0191], [0193], [0194], [0202]	6th	Luke 22:54-65 ^{[0124(part)]}	1	National Library of France Copt. 129,8 fol.139	Paris	France	INTF
070= [0110], [0124], [0178], [0179], [0180], [0190], [0191], [0193], [0194], [0202]	6th	Luke 23:4-24:26 ^{[0124(part)]}	8	National Library of France Copt. 129,8 fol.147-154	Paris	France	INTF
070= [0110], [0124], [0178], [0179], [0180], [0190], [0191], [0193], [0194], [0202]	6th	John 3:23-26 ^{[0193]}	1	National Library of France Copt. 132,2, fol. 92	Paris	France	Facsimile INTF, CSNTM
070= [0110], [0124], [0178], [0179], [0180], [0190], [0191], [0193], [0194], [0202]	6th	John 5:22-31 ^{[0124(part)]}	1	National Library of France Copt. 129,9 fol.87	Paris	France	INTF
070= [0110], [0124], [0178], [0179], [0180], [0190], [0191], [0193], [0194], [0202]	6th	John 5:38-39	1	National Library of France Copt. 132,2 Fol.75 (Abb. S. 84–85)	Paris	France	CSNTM
070= [0110], [0124], [0178], [0179], [0180], [0190], [0191], [0193], [0194], [0202]	6th	John 7:3-12 ^{[0180]}	1	Austrian National Library Pap. K. 15	Vienna	Austria	CSNTM
070= [0110], [0124], [0178], [0179], [0180], [0190], [0191], [0193], [0194], [0202]	6th	John 8:13-22 ^{[0110]}	1	British Library Add. 34274 + National Library of France Copt. 129,10, Fol.142 (Abb. S. 86–87)	London Paris	United Kingdom France	INTF
070= [0110], [0124], [0178], [0179], [0180], [0190], [0191], [0193], [0194], [0202]	6th	John 8:33-42	1	Clarendon Press, b. 2, fol. 26	Oxford	United Kingdom	INTF
070= [0110], [0124], [0178], [0179], [0180], [0190], [0191], [0193], [0194], [0202]	6th	John 8:42-9:39 ^{[0124(part)]}	6	National Library of France Copt. 129,10 fol.119-124	Paris	France	
070= [0110], [0124], [0178], [0179], [0180], [0190], [0191], [0193], [0194], [0202]	6th	John 11:50-56 ^{[0124(part)]}	1	National Library of France Copt. 129,10 fol.156	Paris	France	
070= [0110], [0124], [0178], [0179], [0180], [0190], [0191], [0193], [0194], [0202]	6th	John 12:33-34	1	National Library of France Copt. 133,1, Table 37 No.120 (Abb. S. 88–89)	Paris	France	CSNTM
070= [0110], [0124], [0178], [0179], [0180], [0190], [0191], [0193], [0194], [0202]	6th	John 12:46-13:4 ^{[0124(part)]}	1	National Library of France Copt. 129,10 fol.164	Paris	France	
071	5th/6th	Matthew 1:21-24, 1:25; 2:1-2	1	Houghton Library, Harvard University MS Gr SM3735	Cambridge, MA	United States	HL, INTF
072	5th/6th	Mark 2:23-27; 3:1-5	1	Owner unknown			INTF
073=[084]	6th	Matthew 14:28-31	1	Saint Catherine's Monastery, Harris 7	Sinai	Egypt	INTF
073=[084]	6th	Matthew 14:-27, 14:31-35, 15:2-8	1	National Library of Russia, Gr. 277	Saint Petersburg	Russia	INTF
[074]=064							
075	10th	Pauline epistles^{K}†	333	National Library, 100, fol. 46-378	Athens	Greece	CSNTM
075	10th	Pauline epistles^{K}†	333	National Library, 100, fol. 46-378	Athens	Greece	INTF
076	5th/6th	Acts 2:11-22†	1	Pierpont Morgan Library, Pap. G. 8	New York City	United States	CSNTM
076	5th/6th	Acts 2:11-22†	1	Pierpont Morgan Library, Pap. G. 8	New York City	United States	INTF
077	5th	Acts 13:28-29	1	Saint Catherine's Monastery, Harris App. 5	Sinai	Egypt	
078	6th	Matthew 17:26-27, 18:1-3, 19:5-14; Luke 18:14-25; John 4:52-54, 5:1-9, 20:17-26	6	National Library of Russia, Gr. 13, fol. 1–7	Saint Petersburg	Russia	INTF
079	6th	Luke 7:39-49, 24:10-19	2	National Library of Russia, Gr. 13, fol. 8–10	Saint Petersburg	Russia	INTF
080	6th	Mark 9:14-18, 9:20-22, 10:23-24, 29	1	National Library of Russia, Gr. 275 (3)	Saint Petersburg	Russia	
080	6th	Mark 9:14-18, 9:20-22, 10:23-24, 29	1	Greek Orthodox Patriarchate 496	Alexandria	Egypt	
[081]= 0285							
082	6th	Ephesians 4 4:2-18	1	State Historical Museum, V. 108	Moscow	Russia	
083=[0235], [0112]	5th/6th	John 1:25-41, 2:9-4, 14:34-50	6	National Library of Russia, Gr. 10	Saint Petersburg	Russia	INTF
083=[0235], [0112]	5th/6th	Mark 13:12-14, 16–19, 21–24, 26–28	1	National Library of Russia, Oct. 149	Saint Petersburg	Russia	INTF
083=[0235], [0112]	5th/6th	Mark 14:29-45, 15:27-16:10	4	Saint Catherine's Monastery Harris 12	Sinai	Egypt	INTF
[084]=073							
085	6th	Matthew 20:3-32, 22:3-16	3	National Library of Russia, Gr. 714	Saint Petersburg	Russia	INTF
086	6th	John 3:5-4:18, 23–35, 45–49	13	British Library, Or. 5707	London	United Kingdom	INTF
086	6th	John 1:23-26	1	Museum of Egyptian Antiquities, 9239	Cairo	Egypt	INTF
087=[092b]	6th	Matthew 19:3-8, 21:19-24; John 18:29-35	2	National Library of Russia, Gr. 12.278	Saint Petersburg	Russia	INTF
087=[092b]	6th	Matthew 1:23-2:2	1	Saint Catherine's Monastery 218	Sinai	Egypt	INTF
088	5th/6th	1 Corinthians 15:53–16:9, Titus 1:1–13	2	National Library of Russia, Gr. 6 II, fol. 5–6	Saint Petersburg	Russia	INTF
[089]=0293							
[090]=064							
091	6th	John 6:38-42, 44–45, 47–52, 54–62	2	Library of the Russian Academy of Sciences, Fremdspr. Hss. F. 410	Saint Petersburg	Russia	
091	6th	John 6:13-14, 22–24	1	National Library of Russia, Gr. 279	Saint Petersburg	Russia	INTF
[092]= 0293, 087							
093	6th	Acts 24:22-25:5; 1 Peter 2:22-3:7	2	Cambridge University Library, Taylor-Schechter Coll. 12, 189.208	Cambridge	United Kingdom	INTF
094	6th	Matthew 24:9–21	1	National Library, Or. 2106, fol. 350	Athens	Greece	CSNTM
094	6th	Matthew 24:9–21	1	National Library, Or. 2106, fol. 350	Athens	Greece	INTF
095=[0123]	8th	Acts 2:45-3:8	1	National Library of Russia, Gr. 17	Saint Petersburg	Russia	INTF
095=[0123]	8th	Acts 2:22, 26–28, 2:45-3:2	1	National Library of Russia, Gr. 49	Saint Petersburg	Russia	INTF
096	7th	Acts 2:6-17, 26:7-18	2	National Library of Russia, Gr. 19	Saint Petersburg	Russia	INTF
097	7th	Acts 13:39-46	1	National Library of Russia, Gr. 18	Saint Petersburg	Russia	INTF
098	7th	2 Corinthians 11:9-19	1	Escherico Monastery of Santa Maria di Grottaferrata	Grottaferrata	Italy	INTF
099	7th	Mark 16:6-18	1	National Library, Copt. 129,8	Paris	France	INTF
[0100] =ℓ 963							

=== Uncials 0101-0200 ===
#	Date	Content	Pages	Institution	City	Country	Images
0101	8th	John 1:29-32	1	Austrian National Library, Pap. G. 39780	Vienna	Austria	CSNTM, INTF
0102=[0138]	7th	Luke 3:23-4:2, 4:30-42, 21:4-18	3	Vatopedi Monastery 1219	Mount Athos	Greece	INTF
0102=[0138]	7th	Luke 4:3-29	2	National Library, Supplément grec 1155, I, fol. 1.2	Paris	France	BnF, CSNTM, INTF
0102=[0138]	7th	Matthew 21:24-24:15	8	Protatou Monastery, 56	Mount Athos	Greece	INTF
0103	7th	Mark 13:34-14:25	2	National Library, Suppl. Gr. 726, ff. 6–7	Paris	France	INTF
0104	6th	[Matthew 23:7-22; Mark 1:28-41, 13:12-14:3	4	Bibliothèque nationale de France, Suppl. Gr. 726, ff. 1–5, 8–10	Paris	France	INTF
0105	10th	John 6:71-7:46	4	Austrian National Library, Suppl. Gr. 121	Vienna	Austria	CSNTM
0105	10th	John 6:71-7:46	4	Austrian National Library, Suppl. Gr. 121	Vienna	Austria	INTF
0106=[0119]	7th	Matthew 13:37-46, 13:55-14:8, 14:29-15:4, 15:15-26	4	Saint Catherine's Monastery, Harris 8	Sinai	Egypt	INTF
0106=[0119]	7th	Matthew 13:46-55, 14:8-29, 15:4-14	4	Leipzig University, Cod. Gr. 7	Leipzig	Germany	
0106=[0119]	7th	Matthew 13:32-36	1	Selly Oak College, Mingana chr. Arab. 93	Birmingham	United Kingdom	INTF
0106=[0119]	7th	Matthew 12:17-25	1	National Library of Russia, Gr. 16	Saint Petersburg	Russia	INTF
0107	7th	Matthew 22:15-23:14; Mark 4:24-35, 5:14-23	6	National Library of Russia, Gr. 11	Saint Petersburg	Russia	INTF
0108	7th	Luke 11:37-45	1	National Library of Russia, Gr. 22	Saint Petersburg	Russia	INTF
0109	7th	John 16:30-17:9, 18:31-40	2	Berlin State Museums, P. 5010	Berlin	Germany	BerlPap, INTF
[0110]= 070							
0111	7th	2 Thessalonians 1:1–2:2	1	Berlin State Museums, P. 5013	Berlin	Germany	BerlPap, INTF, CSNTM
[0112]= 083							
[0113]= 029							
[0114]=ℓ 965							
0115	9th/10th	Luke 9:35-47; 10:12-22	2	National Library, Grec. 314, ff. 179, 180	Paris	France	BnF, INTF
0116	8th	Matthew 19:14-28, 20:23-21:2, 26:52-27:1; Mark 13:21-14:67; Luke 3:1-4:20	14	Biblioteca Nazionale, Ms. II. C. 15	Naples	Italy	INTF
[0117]= 063							
0118	8th	Matthew 11:27-28	1	Saint Catherine's Monastery, Harris 6	Sinai	Egypt	
[0119]= 0106							
0120	8th	Acts 16:30-17:17, 27–29, 31–34, 18:8-26	6	Vatican Library, Vat. gr. 2302, p. 65, 66, 69–72, 75, 76, 79–94	Vatican City	Vatican City	DVL, INTF, CSNTM
0121	10th	1 Corinthians 15:52 - 1 Corinthians 1:15, 10:13-12:5	2	British Library, Harley 5613	London	United Kingdom	BL, INTF
0122	10th	Galatians 5:12-6:4; Hebrews 5:8-6:10	2	National Library of Russia, Gr. 32	Saint Petersburg	Russia	INTF
[0123]=095							
[0124]=070							
[0125]=029							
0126	8th	Mark 5:34-6:2	1	Owner Unknown			INTF
0127	8th	John 2:2–11	2	National Library, Copt. 129,10 fol. 207	Paris	France	INTF, CSNTM
0128	9th	Matthew 25:32-37, 40–42, 44–45	1	National Library, Copt. 129,10 f. 208	Paris	France	INTF
[0129]=ℓ 1575							
0130	9th	Mark 1:31-2:8	3	Central Library, C 57, fol. 5, 74, 93, 135).	Zurich	Switzerland	INTF
0130	9th	Mark 2:8-16; Luke 1:20-31, 64–79, 2:24-48	4	Abbey library of Saint Gall, 18, fol. 143–146; 45, fol. 1–2	St. Gallen	Switzerland	INTF
0130	9th	Mark 2:8-16; Luke 1:20-31, 64–79, 2:24-48	4	Abbey library of Saint Gall, 18, fol. 143–146; 45, fol. 1–2	St. Gallen	Switzerland	e-codices,
0131	9th	Mark 7:3, 6–8, 7:30-8:16, 9:2, 7–9	4	Trinity College, B VIII, 5	Cambridge	United Kingdom	INTF
0132	9th	Mark 5:16-40	1	Christ Church College, Wake 37, f. 237	Oxford	United Kingdom	INTF
0133	9th	Matthew 1:1-14, 5:3-19, 23:9-25:30, 25:43-26:26, 26:50-27:16; Mark 1:1-43, 2:21-5:1, 5:29-6:22, 10:51-11:13	36	British Library, Add. 31919	London	United Kingdom	BL
0133	9th	Matthew 1:1-14, 5:3-19, 23:9-25:30, 25:43-26:26, 26:50-27:16; Mark 1:1-43, 2:21-5:1, 5:29-6:22, 10:51-11:13	36	British Library, Add. 31919	London	United Kingdom	INTF
0134	8th	Mark 3:15-32, 5:16-31	2	Bodleian Library, Selden Supra 2, fol. 177–178	Oxford	United Kingdom	INTF
0135	9th	Matthew 25:35-26:2, 27:3-17; Mark 1:12-24, 2:26-3:10; Luke 1:24-37, 1:68-2:4, 4:28-40, 6:22-35, 8:22-30, 9:42-53, 17:2-14, 18:7-9, 13–19, 22:11-25, 52–66, 23:35-49, 24:32-46	16	Biblioteca Ambrosiana, Q. 6	Milan	Italy	INTF
0136=[0137]	9th	Matthew 14:6-13, 25:9-16, 25:41-26:1	3	Russian National Library, Gr. 281	Saint Petersburg	Russia	INTF
[0137]= 0136							
[0138]= 0102							
[0139]= 029							
0140	10th	Acts 5:34-38	1	Saint Catherine's Monastery Harris App. 41	Sinai	Egypt	INTF
0141	10th	John^{K}†	349	National Library, Grec 209	Paris	France	INTF
0142	10th	Acts^{K}, Pauline Epistles^{K}, General Epistles^{K}	381	Bavarian State Library, Gr. 375	Munich	Germany	INTF
0143	6th	Mark 8:17-18, 27–28	1	Bodleian Library, Gr. bibl. e, 5(P)	Oxford	United Kingdom	INTF
0144	7th	Mark 6:47-7:14	2	Owner Unknown			
0145	7th	John 6:26–31	1	Owner Unknown			INTF
0146	8th	Mark 10:37–45	1	Owner Unknown			INTF
0147	6th	Gospel of Luke 6:23–35	1	Owner Unknown			INTF
0148	8th	Gospel of Matthew 28:5–19	1	Austrian National Library, Gr. 106	Vienna	Austria	INTF
[0149]= 0187							
0150	9th	Pauline Epistles^{K}†	151	Monastery of St. John, MS 61	Patmos	Greece	CSNTM
0150	9th	Pauline Epistles^{K}†	151	Monastery of St. John, MS 61	Patmos	Greece	INTF
0151	9th	Pauline Epistles	192	Monastery of St. John, MS 62	Patmos	Greece	CSNTM
0151	9th	Pauline Epistles	192	Monastery of St. John, MS 62	Patmos	Greece	INTF
0152		[Talisman containing Matthew 16:9-13]					INTF
0153		[Ostracon containing 2 Corinthians 4:7; 2 Timothy 2:20]					
0154	9th	Mark 10:35-46, 11:17-28	2	Owner Unknown			
0155	9th	Luke 3:1-2, 5, 7–11, 6:24-31	2	Owner Unknown			INTF
0156	6th	2 Peter 3:2-10	1	Owner Unknown			INTF
0157	7th/8th	1 John 2:7-13	1	Owner Unknown			INTF
0158	5th/6th	Galatians 1:1-13	1	Owner Unknown			
0159	6th	Ephesians 4:21-24, 5:1-3	1	Owner Unknown			
0160	4th/5th	Matthew 26:25-26, 34–36	1	Berlin State Museums, P. 9961	Berlin	Germany	BerlPap, INTF, CSNTM
0161	8th	Matthew 22:7-46	1	National Library, 139, fol. 245-246 (fol. 1-244: 1419)	Athens	Greece	CSNTM
0161	8th	Matthew 22:7-46	1	National Library, 139, fol. 245-246 (fol. 1-244: 1419)	Athens	Greece	INTF
0162	3rd/4th	John 2:11–22	1	Metropolitan Museum of Art, Inv. 09.182.43 (P. Oxy. 847)	New York City	United States	INTF
0163	5th	Revelation 16:17-20	1	Oriental Institute, 9351 (P. Oxy. 848)	Chicago	United States	INTF
0164	6th/7th	Matthew 13:20-21	1	Berlin State Museums, P. 9108	Berlin	Germany	BerlPap, INTF
0165	5th	Acts 3:24-4:13, 17–20	1	Berlin State Museums, P. 13271	Berlin	Germany	BerlPap, INTF, CSNTM
0166	5th	Acts 28:30-31; James 1:11	1	University of Heidelberg, P. Heid. Inv. G 1357	Heidelberg	Germany	UOH, INTF, CSNTM
0167	7th	Mark 4:24-29, 37–41, 6:9-11, 13–14, 37–39, 41, 45	1	Catholic University of Louvain, Sect. des mss., frg. H. Omont no. 8	Leuven	Belgium	INTF
0167	7th	Mark 4:24-29, 37–41, 6:9-11, 13–14, 37–39, 41, 45	5	Great Lavra Monastery, D 61	Mount Athos	Greece	INTF
0168	8th	Gospels?	1	Owner Unknown			
0169	4th	Revelation 3:19-4:3	1	Princeton Theological Seminary, Pap. 5 (P. Oxy. 1080)	Princeton	United States	INTF
0170	5th/6th	Matthew 6:5-6, 6:8-10, 6:13-15, 6:17	1	Princeton Theological Seminary, Pap. 11	Princeton	United States	INTF
0171	3rd/4th	Matthew 10:17-23, 25-32	1	Berlin State Museums, P. 11863	Berlin	Germany	INTF
0171	3rd/4th	Luke, 22:44-56, 61-63	1	Laurentian Library, PSI II 124 + PSI I 2	Florence	Italy	BML, CSNTM
0172	5th	Romans 1:27-30, 1:32-2:2	1	Laurentian Library, PSI I 4	Florence	Italy	BML, CSNTM, INTF
0173	5th	James 1:25-27	1	Laurentian Library, PSI I 5	Florence	Italy	BML, CSNTM, INTF
0174	5th	Galatians 2:5–6	1	Laurentian Library, PSI II 118	Florence	Italy	
0175	5th	Acts 6:7-10, 12–15	1	Laurentian Library, PSI II 125	Florence	Italy	BML, CSNTM, INTF
0176	4th/5th	Galatians 3:16-25	1	Laurentian Library, PSI III 251	Florence	Italy	BML, CSNTM, INTF
0177	10th	Luke 1:73-2-7	1	Austrian National Library, Pap. K. 2698	Vienna	Austria	CSNTM, INTF
[0178]=070							
[0179]= 070							
[0180]=070							
0181	4th/5th	Luke 9:59-10:14	1	Austrian National Library, Pap. G. 39778	Vienna	Austria	CSNTM, INTF
0182	5th	Luke 19:18-20, 22–24	1	Austrian National Library, Pap. G. 39781	Vienna	Austria	CSNTM, INTF
0183	7th	1 Thessalonians 3:6-9, 4:1-5	1	Austrian National Library, Pap. G. 39778	Vienna	Austria	INTF
0184	6th	Mark 15:36-37, 40–41	1	Austrian National Library, Pap. K. 8662	Vienna	Austria	CSNTM, INTF
0185	4th	1 Corinthians 2:5-6, 9, 13, 3:2-3	1	Austrian National Library, Pap. G. 39787	Vienna	Austria	CSNTM
0185	4th	1 Corinthians 2:5-6, 9, 13, 3:2-3	1	Austrian National Library, Pap. G. 39787	Vienna	Austria	INTF
0186=[0224]	5th/6th	Corinthians 4:5-8, 10, 13	1	Austrian National Library, Pap. G. 39788	Vienna	Austria	CSNTM
0186=[0224]	5th/6th	Corinthians 4:5-8, 10, 13	1	Austrian National Library, Pap. G. 39788	Vienna	Austria	INTF
0187=[0149]	6th	Mark 6:30-41	1	University of Heidelberg, Pap. 1354	Heidelberg	Germany	UOH, CSNTM, INTF
0188	4th	Mark 11:11-17	1	Berlin State Museums, P. 13416	Berlin	Germany	BerlPap, INTF, CSNTM
0188	4th	Mark 11:11-17	1	Berlin State Museums, P. 13416	Berlin	Germany	CSNTM
0189	2nd/3rd	Acts 5:3–21	1	Berlin State Museums, P. 11765	Berlin	Germany	BerlPap, INTF, CSNTM
[0190]=070							
[0191]=070							
[0192]= ℓ 1604							
[0193]=070							
[0194]= 070							
[0195]=ℓ 963							
0196	9th	Matthew 5,1-11; Luke 24:26-33	2	Owner Unknown			
0197	9th	Matthew 20:22-23, 25–27, 22:30-32, 34–37	2	The Abbey of St. Martin at Beuron	Beuron	Germany	INTF
0197	9th	Matthew 20:22-23, 25–27, 22:30-32, 34–37	2	The Abbey of St. Martin at Beuron	Beuron	Germany	CSNTM
0198	6th	Colossians 3:15-16, 20–21	1	British Library, Pap. 459	London	United Kingdom	INTF
0199	6th/7th	1 Corinthians 11:17-19, 22–24	1	British Library, Pap. 2077 B	London	United Kingdom	INTF
0200	7th	Matthew 11:20-21	1	British Library, Pap. 2077 C	London	United Kingdom	INTF

=== Uncials 0201-0300 ===
#	Date	Content	Pages	Institution	City	Country	Images
0201	5th	1 Corinthians 12:2-3, 6–13; 14:19-29	2	British Library, Pap. 2240	London	United Kingdom	INTF
[0202]=070	6th						
[0203]=ℓ 1575							
0204	7th	Matthew 24:39-42, 44–48	1	British Library, Gr. 4923	London	United Kingdom	INTF
[0205]=ℓ 1575							
0206	4th	1 Peter 5:5-13	1	Museum of the Bible, MS.000284, P. Oxy. 1353	Washington, DC	United States	MOTB
0207	4th	Revelation 9:2–15	1	Laurentian Library, PSI 1166	Florence	Italy	BML, INTF
0207	4th	Revelation 9:2–15	1	Laurentian Library, PSI 1166	Florence	Italy	CSNTM
0208	6th	Colossians 1:29-2:10, 13–14; 1 Thessalonians 2:4-7, 12–17	2	Bavarian State Library, 29022	Munich	Germany	BSB, INTF
0208	6th	Colossians 1:29-2:10, 13–14; 1 Thessalonians 2:4-7, 12–17	2	Bavarian State Library, 29022	Munich	Germany	CSNTM
0209	7th	Romans 14:9-23, 16:25-27, 15:1-2; 2 Corinthians 1:1-15, 4:4-13, 6:11-7:2, 9:2-10:17; 2 Peter 1:1-2:3	8	University of Michigan Library, Ms. 8, fol. 96.106-112	Ann Arbor	United States	CSNTM
0209	7th	Romans 14:9-23, 16:25-27, 15:1-2; 2 Corinthians 1:1-15, 4:4-13, 6:11-7:2, 9:2-10:17; 2 Peter 1:1-2:3	8	University of Michigan Library, Ms. 8, fol. 96.106-112	Ann Arbor	United States	INTF
0210	7th	John 5:44, 6:1-2, 41–42	2	Berlin State Museums, P. 3607, 3623	Berlin	Germany	BerlPap, INTF, CSNTM
0210	7th	John 5:44, 6:1-2, 41–42	2	Berlin State Museums, P. 3607, 3623	Berlin	Germany	CSNTM
0211	9th	Gospels	256	Georgian National Center of Manuscripts, Gr. 27	Tbilisi	Georgia	CSNTM
0212	3rd	Gospels Diatessaron	1	Yale University, P. Dura 24	New Haven	United States	CSNTM
0212	3rd	Gospels Diatessaron	1	Yale University, P. Dura 24	New Haven	United States	INTF
0213	5th/6th	Mark 3:2-3, 5	1	Austrian National Library, Pap. G. 1384	Vienna	Austria	CSNTM
0213	5th/6th	Mark 3:2-3, 5	1	Austrian National Library, Pap. G. 1384	Vienna	Austria	INTF
0214	4th/5th	Mark 8:33-37	1	Austrian National Library, Pap. G. 29300	Vienna	Austria	CSNTM
0214	4th/5th	Mark 8:33-37	1	Austrian National Library, Pap. G. 29300	Vienna	Austria	INTF
[0215]=059							
0216	5th	John 8:51-53, 9:5-8	1	Austrian National Library, Pap. G. 3081	Vienna	Austria	CSNTM, INTF
0217	5th	John 11:57-12:7	1	Austrian National Library, Pap. G. 39212	Vienna	Austria	CSNTM, INTF
0218	5th	John 12:2-6, 9–11, 14–16	1	Austrian National Library, Pap. G. 19892	Vienna	Austria	CSNTM, INTF
0219	4th/5th	Romans 2:21-23, 3:8-9, 23–25, 27–30	2	Austrian National Library, Pap. G. 36113, 26083	Vienna	Austria	CSNTM
0219	4th/5th	Romans 2:21-23, 3:8-9, 23–25, 27–30	2	Austrian National Library, Pap. G. 36113, 26083	Vienna	Austria	INTF
0220	3rd/4th	Romans 4:23–5:3, 5:8–13	1	Museum of the Bible, MS.000566	Washington, DC	United States	SC, MOTB CSNTM
0220	3rd/4th	Romans 4:23–5:3, 5:8–13	1	Museum of the Bible, MS.000566	Washington, DC	United States	INTF
0221	4th	Romans 5:16-17, 19, 5:21-6:3	1	Austrian National Library, Pap. G. 19890	Vienna	Austria	CSNTM
0221	4th	Romans 5:16-17, 19, 5:21-6:3	1	Austrian National Library, Pap. G. 19890	Vienna	Austria	INTF
0222	4th	1 Corinthians 9:5-7, 10, 12–13	1	Austrian National Library, Pap. G. 29299	Vienna	Austria	CSNTM
0222	4th	1 Corinthians 9:5-7, 10, 12–13	1	Austrian National Library, Pap. G. 29299	Vienna	Austria	INTF
0223	6th	2 Corinthians 1:17-2:2	1	Austrian National Library, Pap. G. 3073	Vienna	Austria	CSNTM
0223	6th	2 Corinthians 1:17-2:2	1	Austrian National Library, Pap. G. 3073	Vienna	Austria	INTF
[0224]=0186							
0225	6th	2 Corinthians 5:1-2, 8–9, 14–16, 19–21, 6:1, 3–5, 8:16-24	3	Austrian National Library, Pap. G. 19802	Vienna	Austria	CSNTM
0225	6th	2 Corinthians 5:1-2, 8–9, 14–16, 19–21, 6:1, 3–5, 8:16-24	3	Austrian National Library, Pap. G. 19802	Vienna	Austria	INTF
0226	5th	1 Thessalonians 4:16–5:5	1	Austrian National Library, Pap. G. 31489	Vienna	Austria	CSNTM
0226	5th	1 Thessalonians 4:16–5:5	1	Austrian National Library, Pap. G. 31489	Vienna	Austria	INTF
0227	5th	Hebrews 11:18-19, 29	1	Austrian National Library, Pap. G. 26055	Vienna	Austria	CSNTM
0227	5th	Hebrews 11:18-19, 29	1	Austrian National Library, Pap. G. 26055	Vienna	Austria	INTF
0228	4th	Hebrews 12:19-21, 23–25	1	Austrian National Library, Pap. G. 19888	Vienna	Austria	CSNTM
0228	4th	Hebrews 12:19-21, 23–25	1	Austrian National Library, Pap. G. 19888	Vienna	Austria	INTF
0229	8th	Revelation 18:16-17, 19:4-6	2	Laurentian Library, PSI XIII 1296	Florence	Italy	BML
0230	4th	Ephesians 6:11-12	1	Laurentian Library, PSI XIII 1306	Florence	Italy	BML
0231	4th	Matthew 26:75-27:1, 3–4	1	Ashmolean Museum, P. Ant. 11	Oxford	United Kingdom	CSNTM, INTF
0232	5th/6th	2 John 1:1-9	1	Ashmolean Museum, P. Ant. 12	Oxford	United Kingdom	INTF
0233	8th	Gospels†	93	Bible Museum, Ms. 1	Münster	Germany	CSNTM
0233	8th	Gospels†	93	Bible Museum, Ms. 1	Münster	Germany	INTF
0234	8th	Matthew 28:11-15; John 1:4-8, 20–24	2	Owner Unknown			
[0235]= 083							
0236	5th	Acts 3:12-13, 15–16	1	Pushkin Museum, Golenishev Copt. 55	Moscow	Russia	INTF
0237	6th	Matthew 15:12-15, 17–19	1	Austrian National Library, Pap. K. 8023	Vienna	Austria	CSNTM, INTF
0238	8th	John 7:10-12	1	Austrian National Library, Pap. K. 8668	Vienna	Austria	CSNTM, INTF
0239	7th	Luke 2:27-30, 34	1	British Library, Or. 4717 (16)	London	United Kingdom	INTF
0240	5th	Titus 1:4-8	1	Georgian National Center of Manuscripts, H-2123, f. 191, 198, 294, 295	Tiflis	Georgia	INTF
0241	6th	1 Timothy 3:16-4:3, 8–11	1	Bodmer Library	Cologny	Switzerland	INTF
0242	4th	Matthew 8:25-9:2, 13:32-38, 40–46	2	Egyptian Museum, 71942	Cairo	Egypt	INTF
0243	10th	1 Corinthians 13:4-16:24; 2 Corinthians 1:1-13:13	7	Biblioteca Marciana, Gr. II,181 (983)	Venice	Italy	INTF
0243	10th	Hebrews 1:1-4:3, 12:20-13:25	2	State and University Library, Cod. 50 in scrin.	Hamburg	Germany	INTF
0244	5th	Acts 11:29-12:5	1	Catholic University of Louvain, P.A.M. Khirbet Mird 8	Louvain-la-Neuve	Belgium	INTF
0245	6th	1 John 3:23-4:1, 3–6	1	Selly Oak Colleges, Mingana Georg. 7	Birmingham	United Kingdom	INTF
0246	6th	James 1:12-14, 19–21	1	Westminster College	Cambridge	United Kingdom	INTF
0247	5th/6th	1 Peter 5:13-14; 2 Peter 1:5-8, 14–16, 2:1	1	John Rylands Library, P. Copt. 20	Manchester	United Kingdom	INTF
0248	9th	Matthew†	70	Bodleian Library, Auct. T 4.21, ff. 45–57, 91–145, 328–331	Oxford	United Kingdom	INTF
0249	10th	Matthew 25:1-9	2	Bodleian Library, Auct. T 4.21, ff. 326, 327	Oxford	United Kingdom	INTF
0250	8th	Gospels†	33	Museum of the Bible, G.C.MS.000149.1-.86	Washington, DC	United States	MOTB
0250	8th	Gospels†	33	Museum of the Bible, G.C.MS.000149.1-.86	Washington, DC	United States	INTF
0251	6th	3 John 12–15; Jude 3–5	1	Louvre, S.N. 121	Paris	France	INTF
0252	5th	Hebrews 6:2-4, 6–7	1	Santa Maria de Montserrat Abbey, II 6	Catalonia	Spain	INTF
0253	6th	Luke 10:19–22	1	Owner Unknown			INTF
0254	5th	Galatians 5:13–17	1	Owner Unknown			INTF
0255	9th	Matthew 26:2-9, 27:9-16	2	Owner Unknown			INTF
0256	8th	John 6:32-33, 35–37	1	Austrian National Library, Pap. G. 26084	Vienna	Austria	INTF, CSNTM
0257	9th	Matthew 5–26; Mark 6–16	47	Monastery of Agiou Nikanoros	Zavorda	Greece	INTF
0258	4th	John 10:25-26	1	Owner Unknown			INTF
0259	7th	1 Timothy 1:4-7	1	Berlin State Museums, P. 3605	Berlin	Germany	BerlPap, INTF
0260	6th	John 1:30-32	1	Berlin State Museums, P. 5542	Berlin	Germany	BerlPap,
0260	6th	John 1:30-32	1	Berlin State Museums, P. 5542	Berlin	Germany	INTF, CSNTM
0261	5th	Galatians 1:9-12, 19–22, 4:25-31	2	Berlin State Museums, P. 6791, 6792, 14043	Berlin	Germany	BerlPap, INTF, CSNTM
0262	7th	1 Timothy 1:15-16	1	Berlin State Museums, P. 13977	Berlin	Germany	BerlPap, INTF, CSNTM
0263	6th	Mark 5:26-27, 31	1	Berlin State Museums, P. 14045	Berlin	Germany	BerlPap, INTF, CSNTM
0264	5th	John 8:19-20, 23–24	1	Berlin State Museums, P. 14049	Berlin	Germany	BerlPap, INTF, CSNTM
0264	5th	John 8:19-20, 23–24	1	Berlin State Museums, P. 14049	Berlin	Germany	CSNTM
0265	6th	Luke 7:20-21, 33–35	1	Berlin State Museums, P. 16994	Berlin	Germany	BerlPap, INTF, CSNTM
0266	6th	Luke 20:19-25, 30–39	1	Berlin State Museums, P. 17034	Berlin	Germany	BerlPap, INTF, CSNTM
0267	5th	Luke 8:25-27	1	Santa Maria de Montserrat Abbey, P. Barc. 16	Catalonia	Spain	INTF
0268	7th	John 1:30-31, 32–33	1	Berlin State Museums, P. 6790	Berlin	Germany	BerlPap, INTF, CSNTM
0268	7th	John 1:30-31, 32–33	1	Berlin State Museums, P. 6790	Berlin	Germany	CSNTM
0269	9th	Mark 6:14-20	1	British Library, Add. 31919, f. 23	London	United Kingdom	BL
0269	9th	Mark 6:14-20	1	British Library, Add. 31919, f. 23	London	United Kingdom	INTF
0270	5th/6th	1 Corinthians 15:-15, 19–25	1	Universiteits Bibliotheek, GK 200	Amsterdam	Netherlands	INTF
0271	9th	Matthew 12:27-39	1	British Library, Add. 31919, f. 22	London	United Kingdom	BL
0271	9th	Matthew 12:27-39	1	British Library, Add. 31919, f. 22	London	United Kingdom	INTF
0272	9th	Luke 16:21-17:3(?), 19-35(?), 19:15-31(?)	3	British Library, Add. 31919, f. 21, 98, 100	London	United Kingdom	BL
0272	9th	Luke 16:21-17:3(?), 19-35(?), 19:15-31(?)	3	British Library, Add. 31919, f. 21, 98, 100	London	United Kingdom	INTF
0273	9th	John 2:17-3:5, 4:23-37, 5:35-6:2	3	British Library, Add. 31919, f. 29, 99, 100	London	United Kingdom	BL
0273	9th	John 2:17-3:5, 4:23-37, 5:35-6:2	3	British Library, Add. 31919, f. 29, 99, 100	London	United Kingdom	INTF
0274	5th	Mark 6:56-7:4, 6–9, 13–17, 19–23, 28, 34, 8:3, 8–11, 9:20-22, 26–41, 9:43-10:1, 17–22	4	Egypt Exploration Society, Suppl. Gr. 79	London	United Kingdom	INTF
0275	7th	Matthew 5:25-26, 29–30	1	Trinity College, TCD PAP F 138	Dublin	Ireland	INTF
[0276]= ℓ 962							
0277	7th/8th	Matthew 14:22, 28–29	1	Instituto Papirologico "G. Vitelli", PSI Inv. CNR 32 C	Florence	Italy	CSNTM
0278	9th	Pauline Epistles† (Romans 1:5-9, 24–30; 1 Corinthians 7:37-8:6; 2 Cor 13:3-12; Galatians 1:1 -2:16, 6:11-18; Ephesians 1:1-8, 16 - 2:5; 4:30 - Phil 3:4; Colossians 1:23 - 2 Thess. 3:18; Titus 2:11-3:2, 3:8 - Hebrews 10:12)	120	Saint Catherine's Monastery, N.E. ΜΓ 2	Sinai	Egypt	INTF
0279	8th/9th	Luke 8:32-44, 22:2-3, 15–16	2	Saint Catherine's Monastery, N.E. ΜΓ 15	Sinai	Egypt	INTF
0280	8th	Hebrews 9:14-18	1	Saint Catherine's Monastery, N.E. ΜΓ 15a	Sinai	Egypt	INTF
0281	7th/8th	Matthew 6–27†	47	Saint Catherine's Monastery, N.E. ΜΓ 29	Sinai	Egypt	
0282	6th	Philippians 2:22-24, 3:6-8	1	Saint Catherine's Monastery, N.E. ΜΓ 29a	Sinai	Egypt	INTF
0283	9th	Mark 2:21-3:18, 5:9-13,31-36, 6:9-13,39-40, 9:20-24, 44–47, 14:54-62, 15:6-15	15	Saint Catherine's Monastery, N.E. ΜΓ 47	Sinai	Egypt	INTF
0284	8th	Matthew 26:75-27:7, 27:9-11, 13–17, 28:15-18, 20	2	Saint Catherine's Monastery, N.E. ΜΓ 48	Sinai	Egypt	INTF
0285= [081]	6th	Romans 5:12, 14, 8:37-9:5, 13:1-4, 13:11-14:3; 1 Corinthians 4:2-7, 12:16, 18, 21–30, 14:26-33; Ephesians 3:13-20, 5:28-6:1; 1 Timothy 1:1-7; Hebrews 8:9-9:1, 9:25-10:2, 11:3-7, 12:22-13:25; 1 Peter 3:17-4:1	20	Saint Catherine's Monastery, N.E. ΜΓ 70	Sinai	Egypt	INTF
0285= [081]	6th	2 Corinthians 1:20-2:12	2	National Library of Russia, Gr. 9	Saint Petersburg	Russia	INTF
0286	6th	Matthew 16:13–19; John 10:12–16	2	Saint Catherine's Monastery, N.E. ΜΓ 72	Sinai	Egypt	INTF
0287	9th	Matthew 1-8†, 21†, 22:1-3; Mark 16:19; Luke 1-12†; John 2†, 10†, 12†, 13†, 17†, 20†, 21†	10	Saint Catherine's Monastery, N.E. ΜΓ 97	Sinai	Egypt	INTF
0288	6th	Luke 5:33-34, 36–37, 5:39-6:1, 3–4	2	Saint Catherine's Monastery, N.E. ΜΓ 98	Sinai	Egypt	INTF
0289	7th/8th	Romans 8:19-21, 32–35; 1 Corinthians 2:11-4:12, 13:13-14:1, 3–11, 13–19	8	Saint Catherine's Monastery, N.E. ΜΓ 99	Sinai	Egypt	INTF
0290	9th	John 18:4–20:2	8	Saint Catherine's Monastery, N.E. ΜΓ 102	Sinai	Egypt	INTF
0291	7th/8th	Luke 8:45-9:2	1	Saint Catherine's Monastery, N.E. ΜΓ 1	Sinai	Egypt	INTF
0292	6th	Mark 6:55-7:5	1	Saint Catherine's Monastery, N.E. ΜΓ 2–4	Sinai	Egypt	INTF
0293=[089], [092a]	6th	Matthew 21:27-28, 31–32	1	Saint Catherine's Monastery, N.E. ΜΓ 10	Sinai	Egypt	INTF
0293=[089], [092a]	6th	Matthew 26:4-7, 10–12	1	Saint Catherine's Monastery, Harris 11	Sinai	Egypt	INTF
0293=[089], [092a]	6th	Matthew 26:2-4, 7–9	1	National Library of Russia, Gr. 280	Saint Petersburg	Russia	INTF
0294	7th/8th	Acts 14:27-15:10	1	Saint Catherine's Monastery, N.E. ΜΓ 16	Sinai	Egypt	INTF
0295	9th	2 Corinthians 12:14–13:1	3	Saint Catherine's Monastery, N.E. ΜΓ 16, 27, 30, 42, 43, 47, 49	Sinai	Egypt	
0296	6th	2 Corinthians 7:3-4, 9–10; 1 John 3:23-4:1, 3–6	3	Saint Catherine's Monastery, N.E. ΜΓ 48, 53, 55	Sinai	Egypt	INTF
0297	9th	Matthew 1:1-14, 5:3-19	2	British Library, Add. 31919, fol. 105, 108	London	United Kingdom	BL
0298	8th/9th	Matthew 26:24-29	1	Fundación Sant Lluc Evangelista, P. Barc. 4	Barcelona	Spain	
0299	10th/11th	John 20:1–7	1	National Library, Copt. 129,10, fol. 199v	Paris	France	INTF, CSNTM
0300	6th/7th	Matthew 20:2–17	1	Coptic Museum, 3525	Cairo	Egypt	INTF

=== Uncials 0301– ===
#	Date	Content	Pages	Institution	City	Country	Images
0301	5th	John 17:1–4	1	Schøyen Collection, MS1367	Oslo	Norway	CSNTM
0302	6th	John 10:29–30	1	Berlin State Museums, P. 21315	Berlin	Germany	BerlPap, INTF, CSNTM
0303	7th	Luke 13:17–29	1	National Library, Suppl. Gr. 1155 VII, fol. 19	Paris	France	BnF, INTF, CSNTM
0304	9th	Acts 6:5, 7:13	1	National Library, Gr. 1126, fol. 160	Paris	France	
0305	5th ???	Matthew 20:22-23, 30–31	1	National Library, Copt. 133.2, fol. 3	Paris	France	
0306	9th	John 9:22-10:3, 5–8, 10–12, 11:6-37, 39–41	7	Bodleian Library, Selden Supra 9, fol. 114–120	Oxford	United Kingdom	INTF
0307	7th	Matthew 11:21-12:4; Mark 11:29-12:21; Luke 9:39-10:5, 22:18-47	7	Vatican Library, Vat. Gr. 2061	Vatican City	Vatican City	INTF
0308	4th	Revelation 11:15-16, 11:17-18	1	Sackler Library, P. Oxy. 4500	Oxford	United Kingdom	INTF
0308	4th	Revelation 11:15-16, 11:17-18	1	Sackler Library, P. Oxy. 4500	Oxford	United Kingdom	CSNTM
0309	6th	John 20:22-24, 20:28-30	1	University of Cologne, Institut für Altertumskunde, Inv. 806	Cologne	Germany	INTF
0309	6th	John 20:22-24, 20:28-30	1	University of Cologne, Institut für Altertumskunde, Inv. 806	Cologne	Germany	CSNTM
0310	10th	Titus 2:15–3:7	1	Cambridge University Library, Ms. Or. 161699	Cambridge	United Kingdom	
0311	8th/9th	Romans 8:1–13	1	De Hamel Collection, Gk. MS 1	Cambridge	United Kingdom	CSNTM, INTF
0311	8th/9th	Romans 8:1–13	1	De Hamel Collection, Gk. MS 1	Cambridge	United Kingdom	CSNTM, INTF
0312	3rd/4th	Luke 5:23-24, 30–31, 7:9, 17–18	1	De Hamel Collection, Gk. MS 2	Cambridge	United Kingdom	CSNTM, INTF
0312	3rd/4th	Luke 5:23-24, 30–31, 7:9, 17–18	1	De Hamel Collection, Gk. MS 2	Cambridge	United Kingdom	CSNTM, INTF
0313	5th	Mark 4:9, 15	1	Museum of the Bible, SIG.PAP.000604	Washington, DC	United States	CSNTM, INTF
0313	5th	Mark 4:9, 15	1	Museum of the Bible, SIG.PAP.000604	Washington, DC	United States	CSNTM, INTF
0314	6th	John 5:43	1	De Hamel Collection, Gk. MS 4	Cambridge	United Kingdom	CSNTM, INTF
0314	6th	John 5:43	1	De Hamel Collection, Gk. MS 4	Cambridge	United Kingdom	CSNTM, INTF
0315	4th/5th	Mark 2:9, 21, 25, 3:1–2	1	De Hamel Collection, Gk. MS 5	Cambridge	United Kingdom	CSNTM, INTF
0315	4th/5th	Mark 2:9, 21, 25, 3:1–2	1	De Hamel Collection, Gk. MS 5	Cambridge	United Kingdom	CSNTM, INTF
0316	7th	Jude 18–25	1	Morgan Library & Museum, M 597 f. II	New York City	United States	MLAM
0317	7th?	Mark 14:52-53, 61–62	1	Cambridge University Library, Mss. Or. 1700	Cambridge	United Kingdom	INTF
0318	7th	Mark 9:2-14:32	18	Morgan Library & Museum, M 661	New York City	United States	
0319= [06^{abs1}]	9th/10th	Pauline Epistles†	177	National Library of Russia, Gr. 20	Saint Petersburg	Russia	INTF
0320= [06^{abs2}]	10th	Ephesians 1:3–9, 2:11–18; 2 Corinthians12:7-20; Titus 1:9-3:11	8	State Archive	Mengeringhausen	Germany	INTF
0321	5th	Matthew 24:37-25:1, 32–45, 26:31-45	3	National Library of Russia, Gr. 6 (fol. 10–12)	Saint Petersburg	Russia	
0322	8th/9th	Mark 3:17-4:1, 6:10-22	6	Ecumenical Patriarchate, Triados 68 (75)	Istanbul	Turkey	CSNTM
0323	4th/5th	John (7:6-9:23)†	4	Saint Catherine's Monastery, Syr. 30	Sinai	Egypt	
0324	5th	Matthew 6:4-6, 8-12†	1	Columbia University, P. 571	New York, NY	United States	CU

== Gallery ==
Photo of Greek Uncial Manuscripts

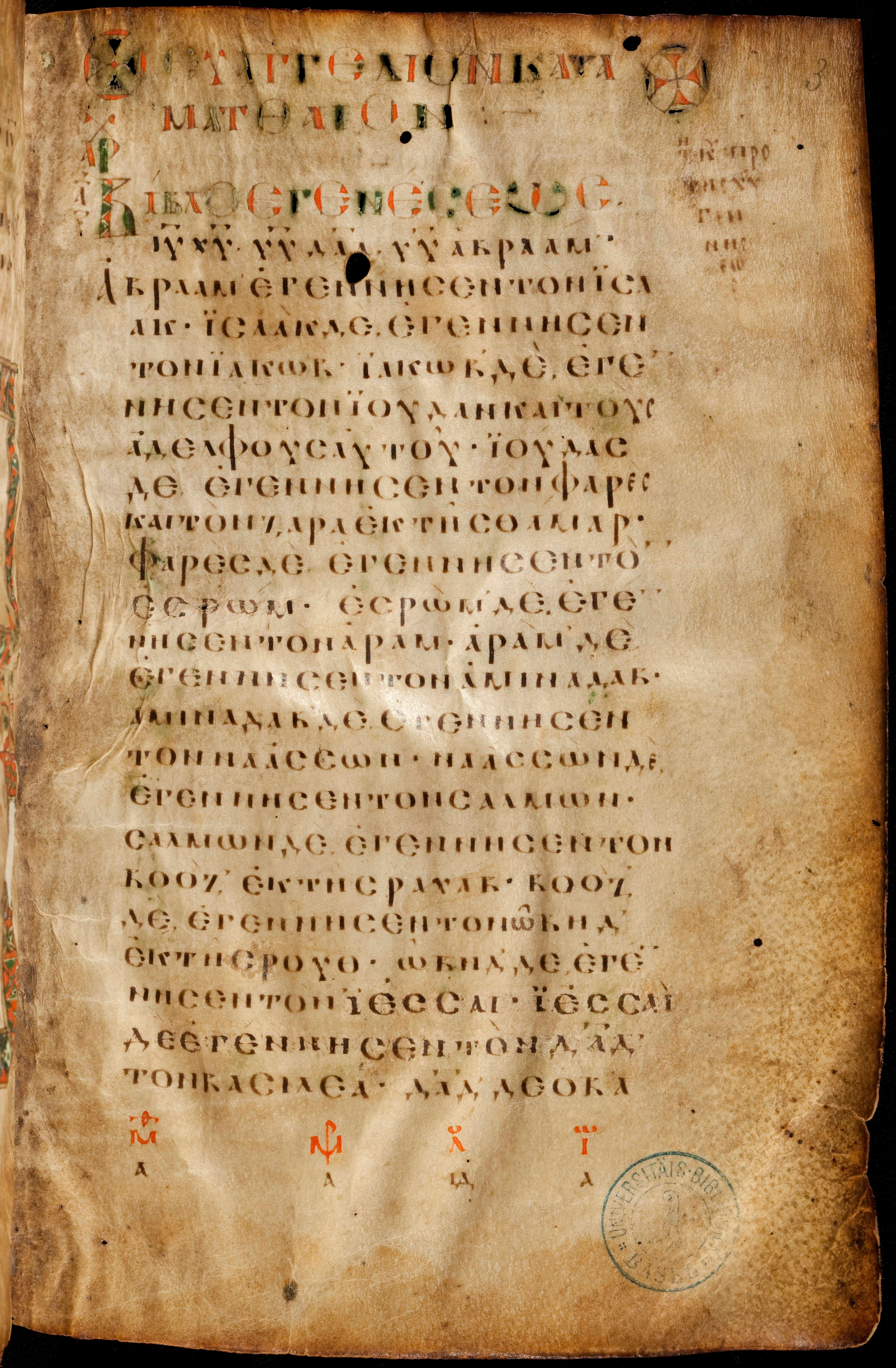
Codex Basilensis A. N. III. 12 Matthew 1

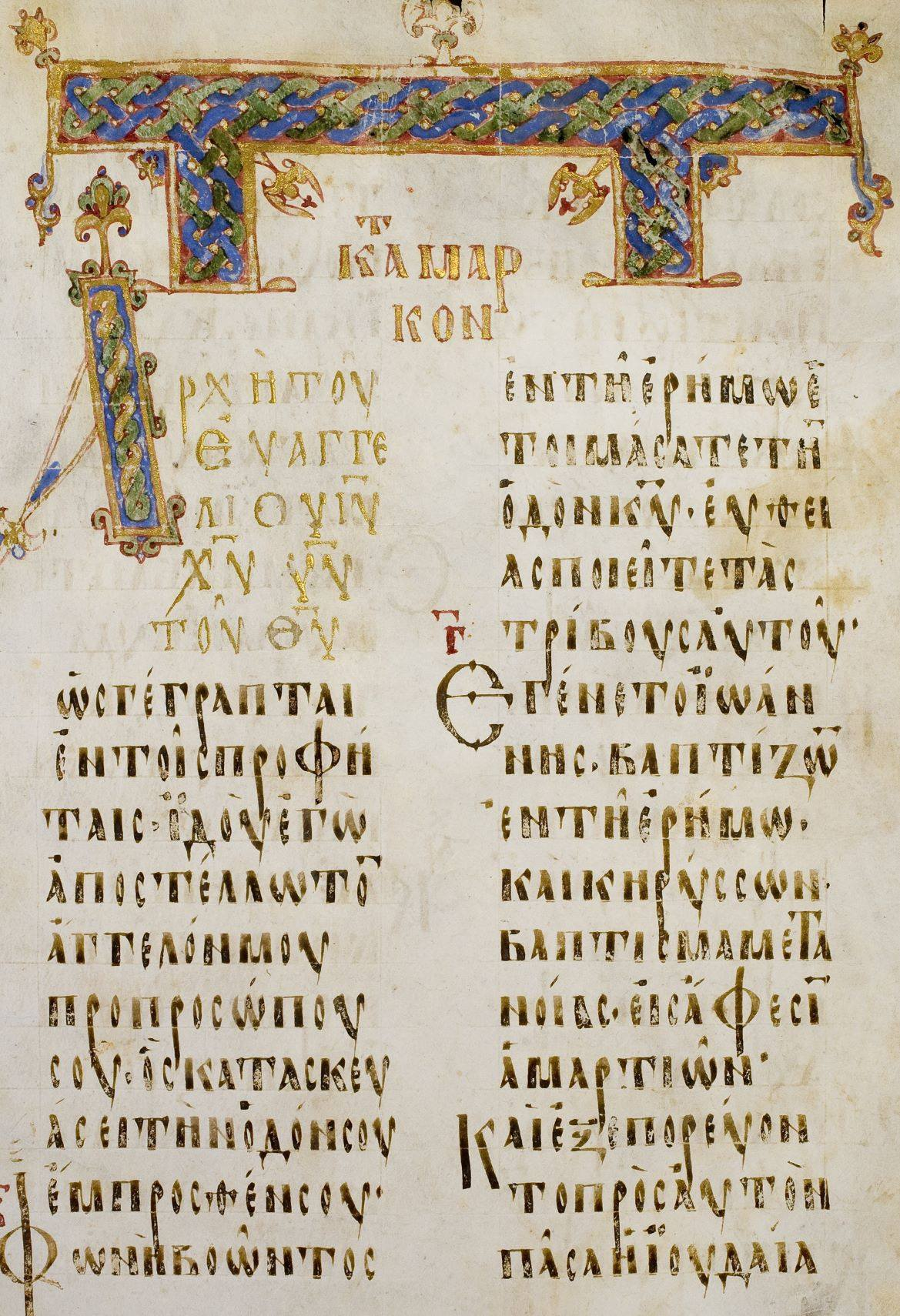
Codex Boreelianus

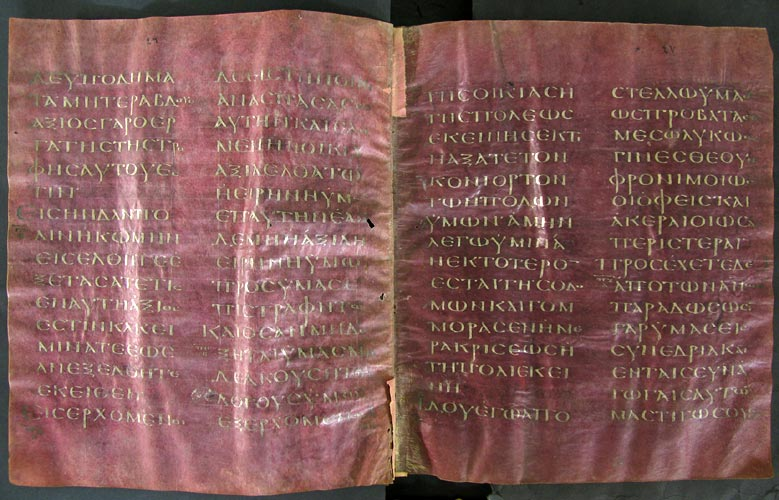
Codex Petropolitanus Purpureus

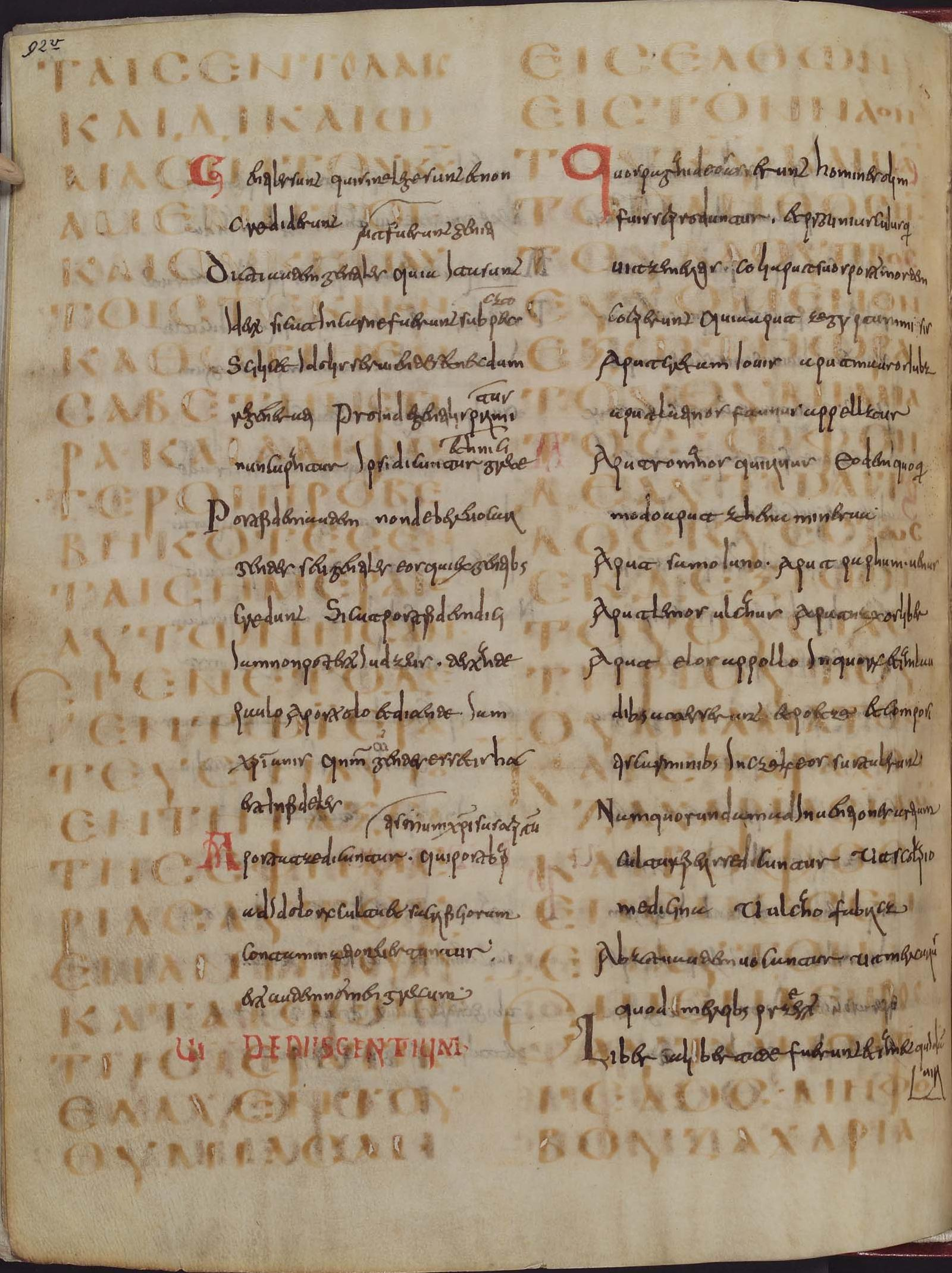
Codex Guelferbytanus A Codex Guelferbytanus B

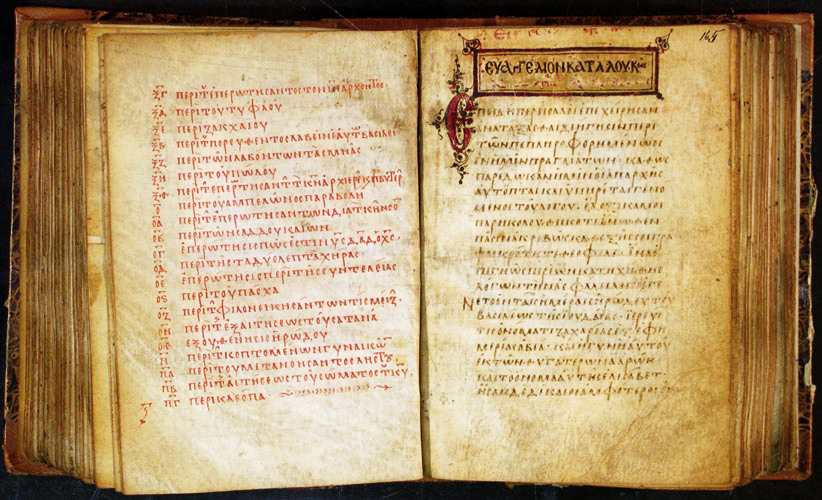
Codex Petropolitanus (New Testament)

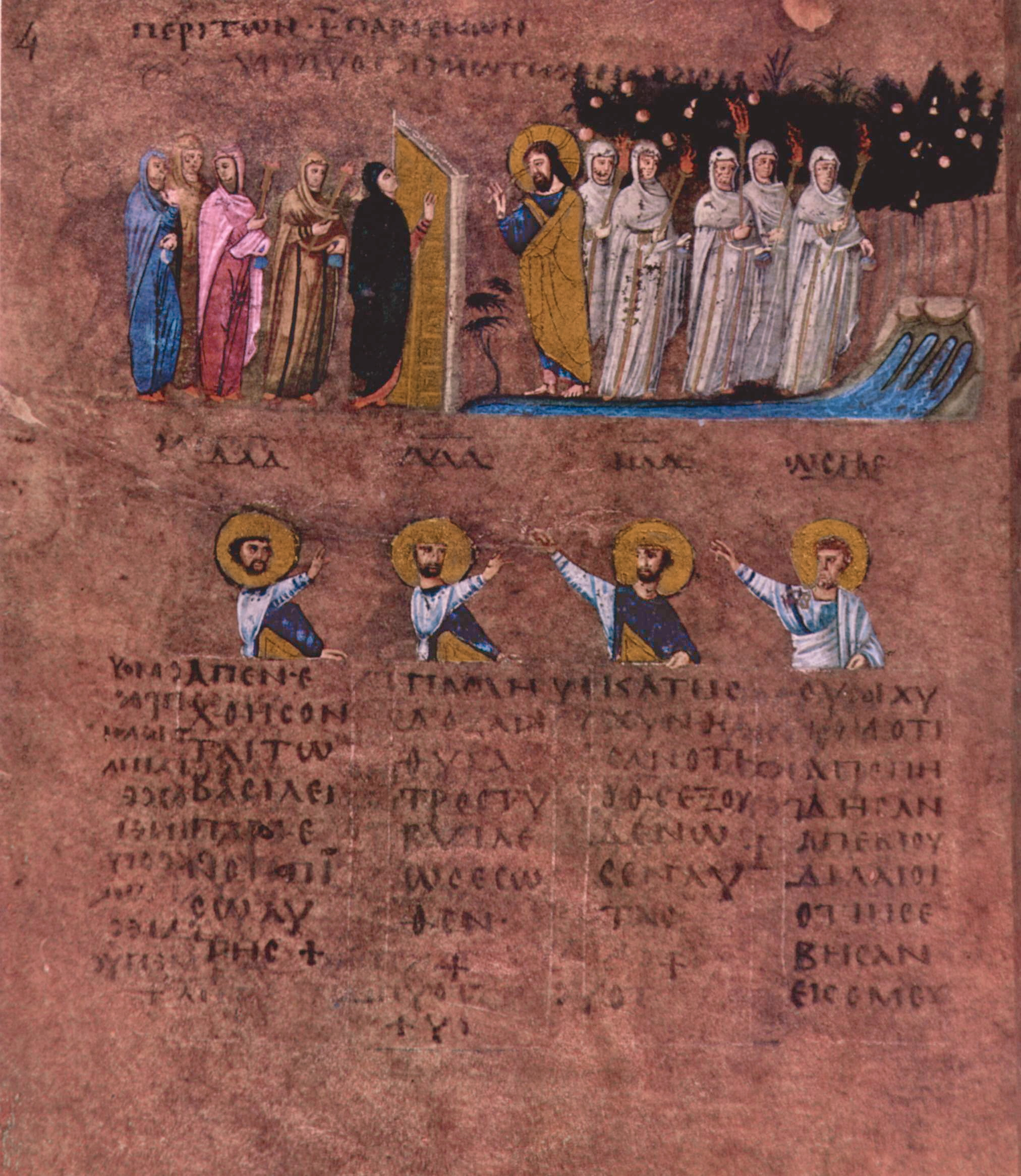
Rossano Gospels

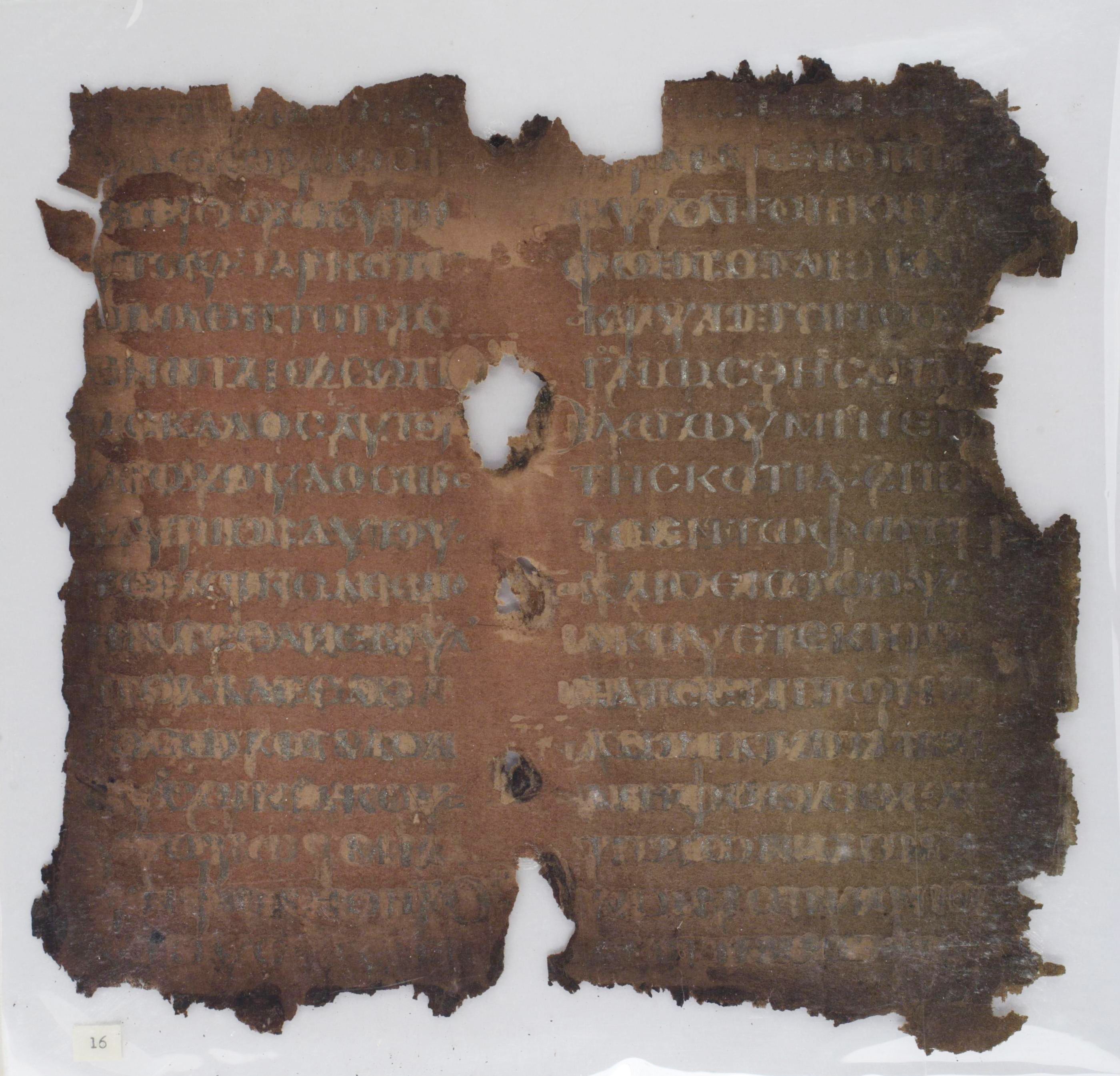
Codex Beratinus

== See also ==
=== Other lists of New Testament manuscripts ===
- List of New Testament papyri
- List of New Testament minuscules
- List of New Testament lectionaries
- List of New Testament amulets
- List of New Testament Latin manuscripts
- List of New Testament Church Fathers
- Categories of New Testament manuscripts
- List of the Syriac New Testament manuscripts

=== Other articles ===
- List of Egyptian papyri by date
- Novum Testamentum Graece
- Palaeography
- Biblical manuscript
- Textual criticism

== Bibliography ==
- Aland, Kurt; Aland, Barbara (1995). The Text of the New Testament: An Introduction to the Critical Editions and to the Theory and Practice of Modern Textual Criticism. Erroll F. Rhodes (trans.). Grand Rapids, Michigan: William B. Eerdmans Publishing Company. ISBN 978-0-8028-4098-1.
- Aland, Kurt, M. Welte, B. Köster and K. Junack. "Kurzgefasste Liste der griechischen Handschriften des Neuen Testaments". Berlin, New York: Walter de Gruyter, 1994.
- Gregory, Caspar René, "Die griechischen Handschriften des Neuen Testaments" (Leipzig 1908).
- Hatch, W.H.P. (1939). The Principal Uncial Manuscripts of The New Testament. University of Chicago Press.
- Kenyon, Frederic. "Our Bible and the Ancient Manuscripts". Eyre & Spottiswoode: London, 1895, 1896, 1898, & 1939.
- Krodel, G. "New Manuscripts of the Greek New Testament". JBL 91/2 (Jun., 1972): 232–238.
- Parpulov, Georgi (2021). Catena Manuscripts of the Greek New Testament (PDF). Piscataway New Jersey: Gorgias Press. p. 241. ISBN 978-1-4632-4260-2.
- Scrivener, F. H. A. "A Plain Introduction to the Criticism of the New Testament". Fourth edition. Cambridge 1861, London 1894.
- Soden, Hermann von. "Die Schriften des Neuen Testaments, in ihrer ältesten erreichbaren Textgestalt hergestellt auf Grund ihrer Textgeschichte". Berlin 1902–1910.
