= Uncial 0316 =

- New Testament manuscript
- Text: Epistle of Jude 18-25
- Date: 7th-century
- Script: Greek
- Now at: The Morgan Library & Museum
- Size: 27 cm by 21 cm
- Type: Alexandrian
- Category: none

Uncial 0316 (in the Gregory-Aland numbering), is a Greek uncial manuscript of the New Testament. Palaeographically it has been assigned to the 7th-century.

The codex contains a small texts of the Epistle of Jude 18-25, on one parchment leaf (27 cm by 21 cm). The leaf has survived in a fragmentary condition.

The text is written in two columns per page, 23-24 lines per page.

It is currently housed at the Morgan Library (M 597 f. II) in New York City.

== See also ==
- List of New Testament uncials
- Biblical manuscript
- Textual criticism
