= Uncial 0317 =

- New Testament manuscript
- Text: Gospel of Mark 14:52-53.61-62
- Date: 7th-century (?)
- Script: Greek
- Now at: Cambridge University Library
- Size: 10 cm by 8 cm
- Type: unknown
- Category: none

Uncial 0317 (in the Gregory-Aland numbering), is a Greek uncial manuscript of the New Testament. Palaeographically it has been assigned to the 7th-century, though it is not sure because text is too brief for certainty.

== Description ==
The codex contains a small texts of the Gospel of Mark 14:52-53.61-62, on one parchment leaf (10 cm by 8 cm). The leaf has survived in a fragmentary condition.

The text is written in one column per page, 11 lines per page.

The Greek text of the codex is too brief too determine its textual character.

Currently it is dated by the INTF to the 7th-century.

It is currently housed at the Cambridge University Library (Or. 1700).

== See also ==
- List of New Testament uncials
- Biblical manuscript
- Textual criticism
