= Uncial 0295 =

- New Testament manuscript
- Text: 2 Corinthians 12:14-13:1
- Date: 9th century
- Script: Greek
- Found: 1975
- Now at: Saint Catherine's Monastery
- Size: 16 cm by 11 cm
- Type: ?
- Category: ?

Uncial 0295 (in the Gregory-Aland numbering), is a Greek uncial manuscript of the New Testament. Palaeographically it has been assigned to the 9th century.

== Description ==
The codex contains a part of the text of the 2 Corinthians 12:14-13:1, on 3 paper leaf (16 cm by 11 cm). The text is written in two columns per page, 14 lines per page, in uncial letters.

Currently it is dated by the INTF to the 9th century.

== Location ==
It is one of the manuscripts discovered in the Saint Catherine's Monastery at Sinai in May 1975, during the restoration work. Currently the codex is housed at the St. Catherine's Monastery (N.E. ΜΓ 16, 27, 30, 42, 43, 47, 49) in Sinai.

== See also ==
- List of New Testament uncials
- Biblical manuscript
- Textual criticism
