= Uncial 0297 =

9th century Greek uncial manuscript of the New Testament

- New Testament manuscript
- Text: Matthew 1:1-14; 5:3-19
- Date: 9th century
- Script: Greek
- Now at: British Library
- Size: 33 cm by 25.8 cm

Uncial 0297 (in the Gregory-Aland numbering), is a Greek uncial manuscript of the New Testament. Palaeographically it has been assigned to the 9th century.

== Description ==
The codex contains a small parts of the Gospel of Matthew, on 2 parchment leaves (33 cm by 25.8 cm). The text is written in two columns per page, 25 lines per page, in uncial letters.

It is a palimpsest, the upper text contains the menaion.

Currently it is dated by the INTF to the 9th century.

== Contents ==
The codex contains: Matthew 1:1-14; 5:3-19.

== Location ==
Currently the codex is housed at the British Library (Additional Manuscripts 31919, fol. 105, 108) in London.

== See also ==
- List of New Testament uncials
- Textual criticism
