= Uncial 0318 =

- New Testament manuscript
- Text: Mark 9:2-14:32
- Date: c. 600
- Script: Greek–Coptic
- Now at: Morgan Library and Museum
- Size: 18 pages; 25 x 22 cm; 27 lines/page (2 col)

Codex 0318 (in the Gregory-Aland numbering), is the most recently registered New Testament Greek uncial codex. It is a diglot Greek–Coptic manuscript. It consists of 18 two-column, 27-line, 25 cm by 22 cm pages. The remaining text is from the Gospel of Mark, including most of chapters nine through 14. It is now part of the Morgan Library and Museum collection (M 661) in New York City.

Currently it is dated by the INTF to the 6th or 7th century.

== See also ==
- List of New Testament uncials
- Textual criticism
