= Uncial 0302 =

- New Testament manuscript
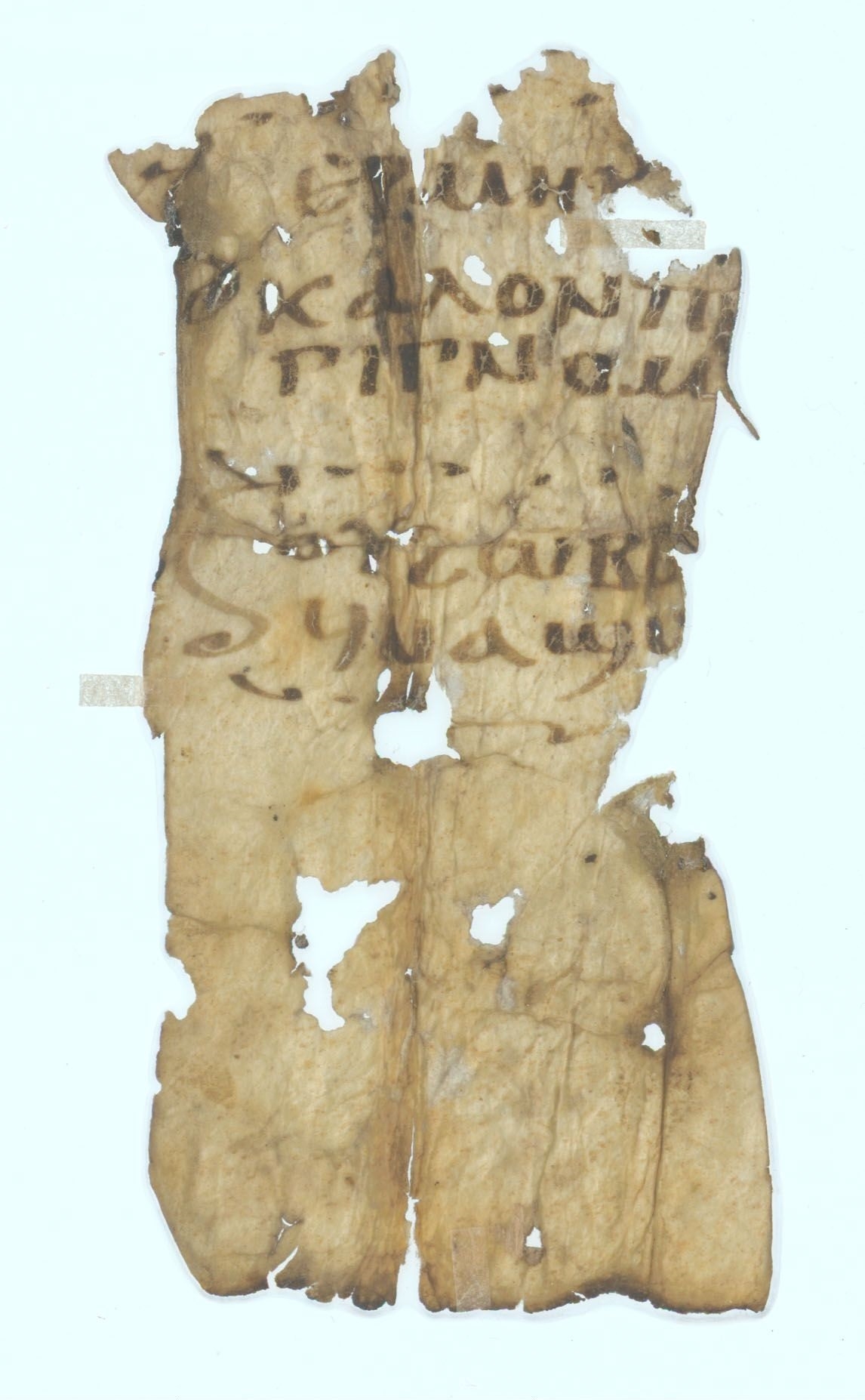
- Name: P. Berol. 21315
- Text: John 10:29-30
- Date: 6th century
- Script: Greek-Coptic
- Now at: Berlin State Museums
- Size: [7.5 x 3.7 cm]
- Type: unknown
- Category: none

Uncial 0302 (in the Gregory-Aland numbering), is a Greek-Coptic uncial manuscript of the New Testament. Palaeographically it has been assigned to the 6th century.

== Description ==
The codex contains two small parts of the Gospel of John 10:29-30, on one parchment fragment (7.5 cm by 3.7 cm). It is written in one column per page, 5 lines per page (on survived fragment only), in uncial letters.

The Greek text of this codex is too brief to determine its textual character.

Currently it is dated by the INTF to the 6th century.

== Location ==
Currently the codex is housed at the Berlin State Museums (P. 21315) in Berlin.

== See also ==
- List of New Testament uncials
- Biblical manuscripts
- Textual criticism
