= Uncial 0294 =

- New Testament manuscript
- Text: Book of Acts 14:27-15:10
- Date: 6th/7th century
- Script: Greek
- Found: 1975
- Now at: Saint Catherine's Monastery
- Size: 25 cm by 21.3 cm
- Type: ?
- Category: ?

Uncial 0294 (in the Gregory-Aland numbering), is a Greek uncial manuscript of the New Testament. Palaeographically it has been assigned to the 6th or 7th century.

== Description ==
The codex contains a part of the text of the Book of Acts 14:27-15:10, on one parchment leaf (25 cm by 21.3 cm; original size: 27 by 22.5 cm). The text is written in two columns per page, 28 lines per page, in uncial letters.

Currently it is dated by the INTF to the 6th or 7th century.

== Location ==
It is one of the manuscripts discovered in Saint Catherine's Monastery at Sinai in May 1975, during the restoration work. Currently the codex is housed at the St. Catherine's Monastery (N.E. ΜΓ 16) in Sinai.

== See also ==
- List of New Testament uncials
- Biblical manuscript
- Textual criticism
