= Greek text of the Book of Revelation =

Greek text and manuscripts of the Book of Revelation

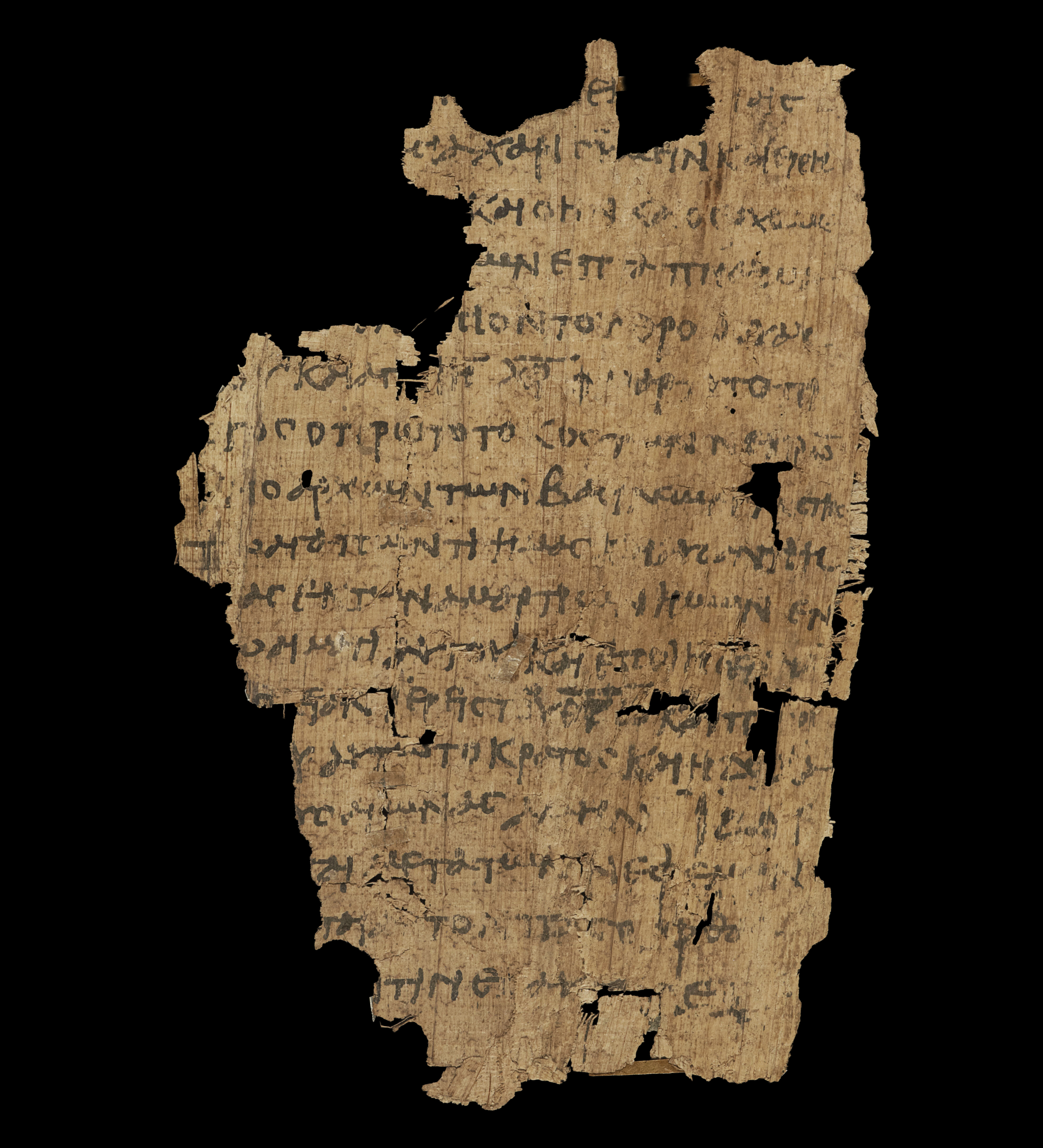
Rev 1:4–7 in $\mathfrak{P}^{18}$

The Greek text of the Book of Revelation has a distinct history compared to other New Testament books and does not reflect the same textual traditions. Due to the relatively small number of manuscripts containing the Book of Revelation, its text has been more thoroughly studied and is considered the most comprehensively analyzed among all New Testament books.

The Greek text of Revelation reflects the book's historical significance within the Greek Church. Its canonicity was long debated, resulting in its exclusion from liturgical use, and it was not commented on by major Eastern Christian exegetes. It lacks manuscripts representing the Western text-type.

Of approximately 5,700 New Testament manuscripts, only 287 contain Revelation, accounting for roughly 6.6% of the total. Notably, the Codex Vaticanus does not include Revelation. The book is rarely found in manuscripts from the 6th to 9th centuries and is absent from Greek lectionaries, as it was not read in the Byzantine Church's liturgy.

== History of research ==
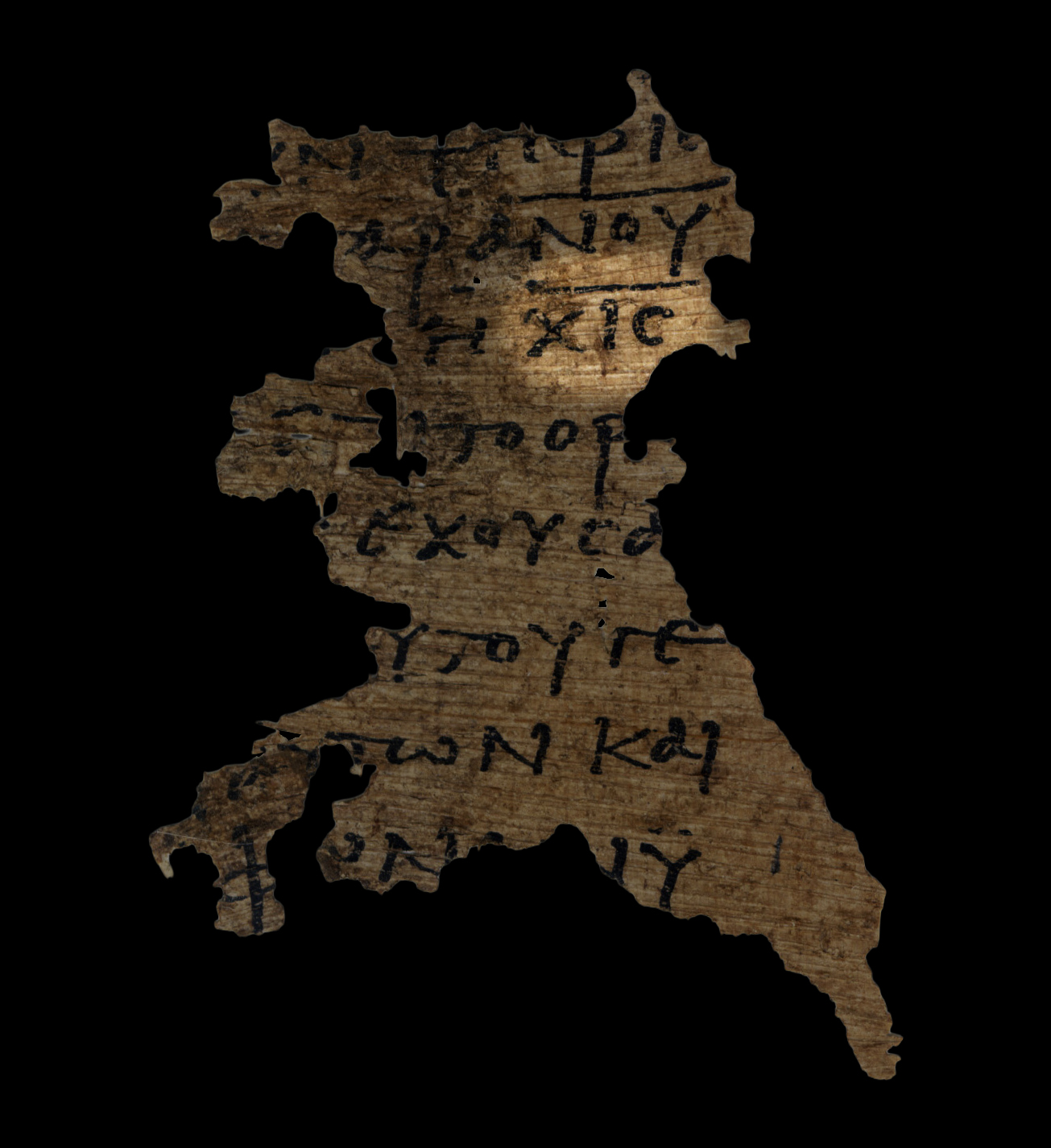
Rev 13:18 in $\mathfrak{P}^{115}$

The number of manuscripts for Revelation is significantly lower than for other New Testament books. Additionally, it was never included in Greek lectionaries. Due to the limited number of ancient and medieval manuscripts, studying the entire manuscript tradition of Revelation is more manageable than for other New Testament books, making its text the most thoroughly researched.

The first systematic study of Revelation's text was undertaken by Samuel Prideaux Tregelles in 1844, who examined three majuscule and 92 minuscule manuscripts, valuing the Codex Alexandrinus and Codex Ephraemi Rescriptus most highly, as they were the only ancient manuscripts available at the time. Brooke Foss Westcott and F. J. A. Hort also prioritized Codex Alexandrinus, a view later supported by Josef Schmid's research (published 1955–1956). Weiss favored Codex Sinaiticus, followed by Alexandrinus and Ephraemi.

Wilhelm Bousset highlighted the significance of manuscripts P and Q as representatives of a non-Hesychian recension. He noted that most manuscripts, particularly later ones, are closely tied to the commentary of Andreas of Caesarea.

Hermann von Soden attempted to apply his theory of three recensions (Hesychian, Antiochene, and Jerusalemite) to Revelation, classifying Andreas of Caesarea's recension as Jerusalemite, despite its Cappadocian origin and lack of connection to Jerusalem or Byzantium.

H. J. Vogels argued that Codex Sinaiticus shows influences of Latin traditions.

R. H. Charles focused on uncial codices, omitting Andreas of Caesarea's recension manuscripts. He emphasized considering the author's style when selecting textual variants and deemed codices A and C the most neutral, with minimal corrections.

Herman C. Hoskier spent 30 years studying all available Revelation manuscripts, publishing his findings in 1929 (Concerning the Text of the Apocalypse). He identified two text types: ecclesiastical and independent text families, with the latter primarily represented by manuscripts from Mount Athos. He distinguished 11 families, highly valuing the Coptic family.

Marie-Joseph Lagrange proposed two categories: type B, represented by uncial codices (S, A, C, E, F) and several minuscules, and the ecclesiastical type, represented by P, I, Q, and minuscules.

José Maria Bover highly valued the Chester Beatty III papyrus, the oldest Revelation manuscript.

Josef Schmid, using commentaries by Oecumenius and Andreas of Caesarea from the 6th century, identified 44 manuscript families, deeming four valuable. He distinguished four families: two ancient ones (one based on codices A, C, and Oecumenius' commentary; the other on Codex Sinaiticus and Chester Beatty III) and two minuscule families (Andreas of Caesarea's text and Textus Receptus). Schmid noted that Oecumenius' commentary aligns with codices A, C, and minuscule 2053.

== Manuscript classification ==
=== Textual traditions ===
As with other New Testament books, the Alexandrian text-type is most highly valued for Revelation, divided into two subgroups. Codex Alexandrinus (A) is widely regarded as the most accurate, deviating from the original in only about 15 places (17 according to W. Bousset). Other significant manuscripts include C (04), 2377, 0207, P (025), 2344, 046, and $\aleph$ (01). A drawback of Codex Alexandrinus is its harmonization of Old Testament quotations with the Septuagint. Published in 1999, $\mathfrak{P}^{115}$ provides a text close to A and C and is considered the best Revelation manuscript, closest to the original. It diverges from Codex Alexandrinus and Ephraemi in only 14 places. Oecumenius' commentary represents this text form.

Although Codex Sinaiticus is generally regarded as superior to codices A and C for other New Testament sections, A and C are preferred for Revelation. Codex Sinaiticus, along with the related Chester Beatty III ($\mathfrak{P}^{47}$), represents the second Alexandrian subgroup, which is less favored by textual critics. The relationships between the A, C, and $\mathfrak{P}^{47}$/$\aleph$ traditions suggest an absence of formal recension, with differences arising by chance.

The Byzantine text divides into two groups: $\mathfrak{M}$^{A}, aligned with Andreas of Caesarea's commentary and represented by 025, and $\mathfrak{M}$^{K}, the standard Byzantine text, represented by 046. These traditions result from recensional efforts in the 6th and 9th centuries, respectively.

Minuscule 2344 is in poor condition, with some text illegible, while 2377 survives in a fragmentary state.

=== Aland categories ===
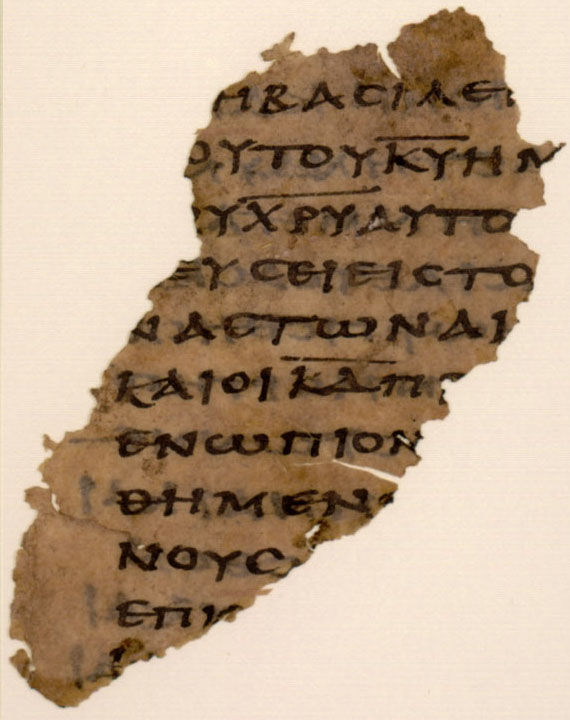
Uncial 0308, transmitting the variant "servants and prophets" in Rev 11:18

Kurt Aland classified Greek New Testament manuscripts into five categories. Category I represents the Alexandrian text-type, while Category III includes manuscripts independent of 4th-century recensions, valuable for establishing the original text and tracing textual history. Category IV, reserved for Western text-type manuscripts, is unrepresented for Revelation. Category V comprises the Byzantine text-type, the most numerous group:

- Category I:
  - $\mathfrak{P}^{18}$ c. 300 (1:4–7)
  - $\mathfrak{P}^{24}$ 4th century (5:5–8; 6:5–8)
  - Chester Beatty III ($\mathfrak{P}^{47}$) 3rd century (9:10–11:3; 11:5–16:15; 16:17–17:2)
  - $\aleph$ (01) 4th century (complete)
  - A (02) 5th century (complete)
  - 2053 13th century (complete)
  - 2062 13th century (chs. 1; 15–22)
  - 2344 11th century (complete)
- Category II:
  - $\mathfrak{P}^{43}$ c. 600 (2:12–13; 15:8–16:2)
  - $\mathfrak{P}^{85}$ c. 400 (9:19–10:2, 5–9)
  - C (04) 5th century (1:1–2; 3:20–5:14; 7:14–17; 8:5–9:16; 10:10–11:3; 16:13–18:2; 19:5–22:21)
  - 1006 11th century (complete)
  - 1611 12th century (21:27–end)
  - 1841 c. 900 (complete)
  - 1854 11th century (complete)
  - 2050 12th century (chs. 1–5; 20–22)
  - 2329 10th century (complete)
- Category III:
  - 0169 4th century (3:19–4:3)
  - 0163 5th century (16:17–20)
  - 0207 4th century (9:2–15)
  - 0229 8th century (18:16–17; 19:4–6)
  - 2351 10th century (1:1–13:17; 14:4–6)
  - 2377 14th century (complete)
- Category V:
  - P (025) 9th century (1:1–16:11; 17:2–19:20; 20:10–22:5)
  - 046 10th century (complete)
  - 052 10th century (7:16–8:12)

=== Nestle-Aland 27th edition ===
The 27th edition of Nestle-Aland (NA27) distinguishes between first- and second-order witnesses among Greek New Testament manuscripts. First-order witnesses include: $\mathfrak{P}^{18}$, $\mathfrak{P}^{24}$, $\mathfrak{P}^{43}$, Chester Beatty III ($\mathfrak{P}^{47}$), $\mathfrak{P}^{85}$, $\mathfrak{P}^{98}$, $\mathfrak{P}^{115}$, Codex Sinaiticus, Codex Alexandrinus, Codex Ephraemi Rescriptus, Uncial 051, Uncial 0163, Uncial 0169, 0207, 0229. Second-order witnesses include: 025, 046, 1006, 1611, 1841, 1854, 2030, 2050 (1107), 2053, 2062, 2329, 2344, 2351, 2377.

No third group for less frequently cited manuscripts was established.

== Ancient translations ==
The Old Latin translation, dating to the late 2nd century, is significant due to its early date but challenging to reconstruct due to secondary influence from the Vulgate. 13 Old Latin manuscripts with Revelation's text and commentaries survive. The Vulgate contains a revised Old Latin text.

Translations into Coptic dialects date to the 3rd century. The Sahidic dialect translation is close to Codex Alexandrinus, while the Bohairic dialect translation is not fully preserved. Ethiopic manuscripts align with codices A and C. The Peshitta did not include Revelation, which appears in later Syriac translations. Arabic, Armenian, and Georgian translations are of later origin. The Armenian translation emerged in the 10th century. The Old Church Slavonic translation appeared in the 12th century.

== Citations from Church Fathers ==
Fragments of Revelation are preserved in citations by Church Fathers. Greek citations by Irenaeus, Hippolytus, Origen, Eusebius, and Methodius of Olympus are particularly significant. Hippolytus' work De Antichristo (manuscript H) is especially valuable for textual criticism. Origen's citations confirm the text of Codex Sinaiticus.

== See also ==
- Interpretations of the Book of Revelation
- List of New Testament papyri
- Textual variants of the Book of Revelation

== Bibliography ==
- Parker, David C. (2008). An Introduction to the NT Manuscripts and Their Texts. Cambridge: Cambridge University Press. ISBN 978-0-521-71989-6.
