= Museum im Westrich =

Local history museum in Ramstein-Miesenbach, Germany

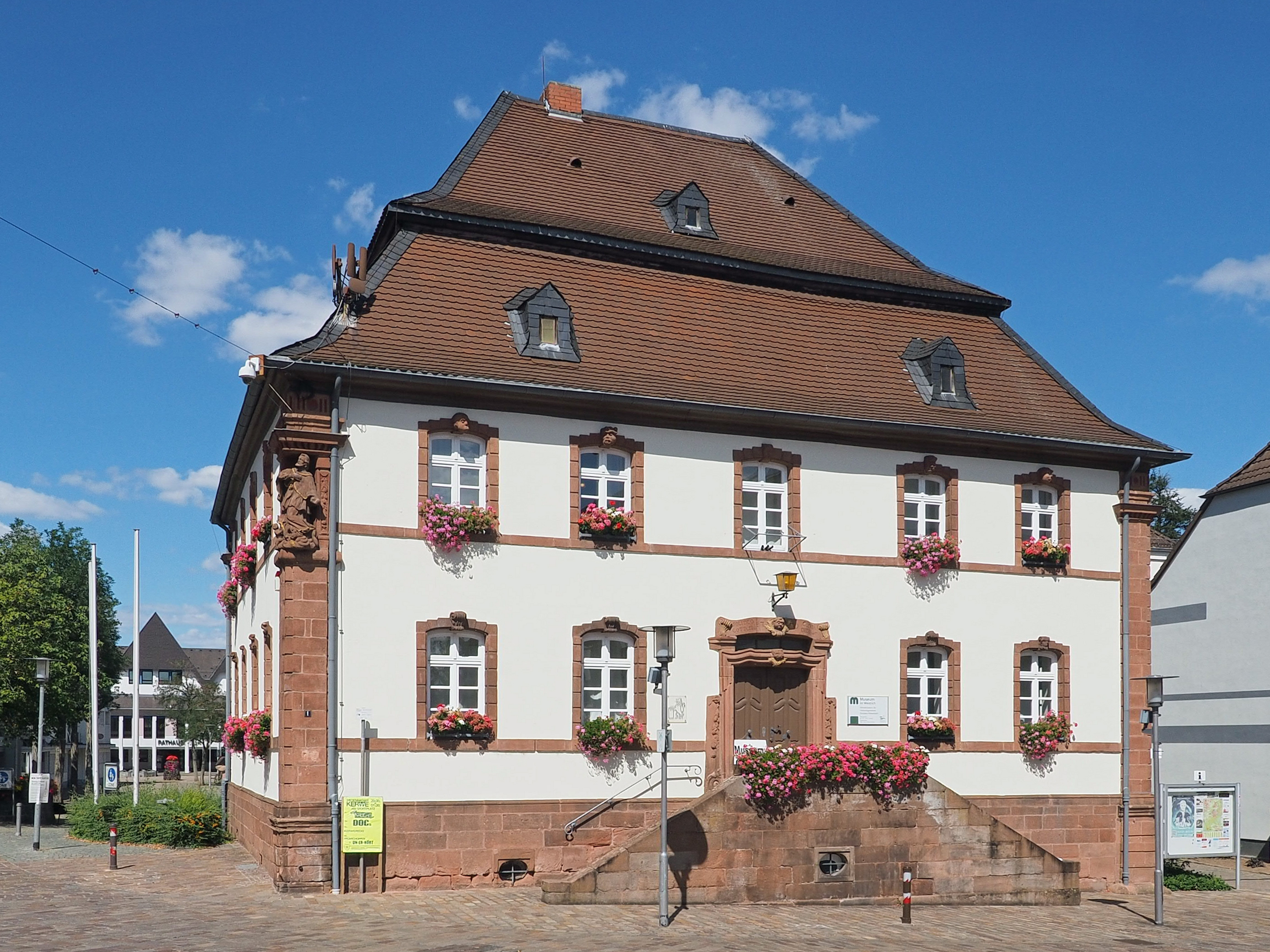

- Location within Germany
- Established: 1987
- Location: Ramstein-Miesenbach, Rhineland-Palatinate, Germany
- Coordinates: 49°26′51″N 7°33′23″E
- Owner: Ramstein-Miesenbach (Verbandsgemeinde)
- Website: www.ramstein-miesenbach.de/de/kultur-freizeit/kultur/museum/

The Museum im Westrich is a local history museum in Ramstein-Miesenbach. It houses collections on the local history and everyday life in the Westrich region.

== History ==
The first plans to establish a local history museum were made as early as 1965 in connection with the celebrations marking the 750th anniversary of the municipality of Ramstein, but they were not implemented. After the founding of the Förderkreises Heimatmuseum (Local History Museum Support Group) in 1983, the collection of exhibits for a museum began. The late Baroque tavern and later town hall at Miesenbacher Straße 1 was converted into a museum building by 1987. The local history museum was officially opened in September 1987.

== Building ==
The museum is located at Miesenbacher Straße 1 in a historically protected building. It is a late Baroque mansard hipped roof building with a niche figure, which was built around 1750 by the wealthy merchant and salt trader Philipp Peter Delarber. The plans were drawn up by Franz Wilhelm Rabaliatti, architect and court master builder to Charles Theodore, Elector of Bavaria.

The building was privately owned until 1949 and was used as a residence, brewery and restaurant. In 1949, the municipality of Ramstein acquired the building from the Koch brewery in Kusel on the condition that the restaurant would remain in operation for another 12 years. In 1961, the restaurant was converted into a council chamber. For the next 22 years, what is now the Museum im Westrich was used as the town hall until the administration moved to a new building. It was then converted into a museum, which now has 310 square metres of exhibition space.

== Exhibition ==
=== Permanent exhibition ===
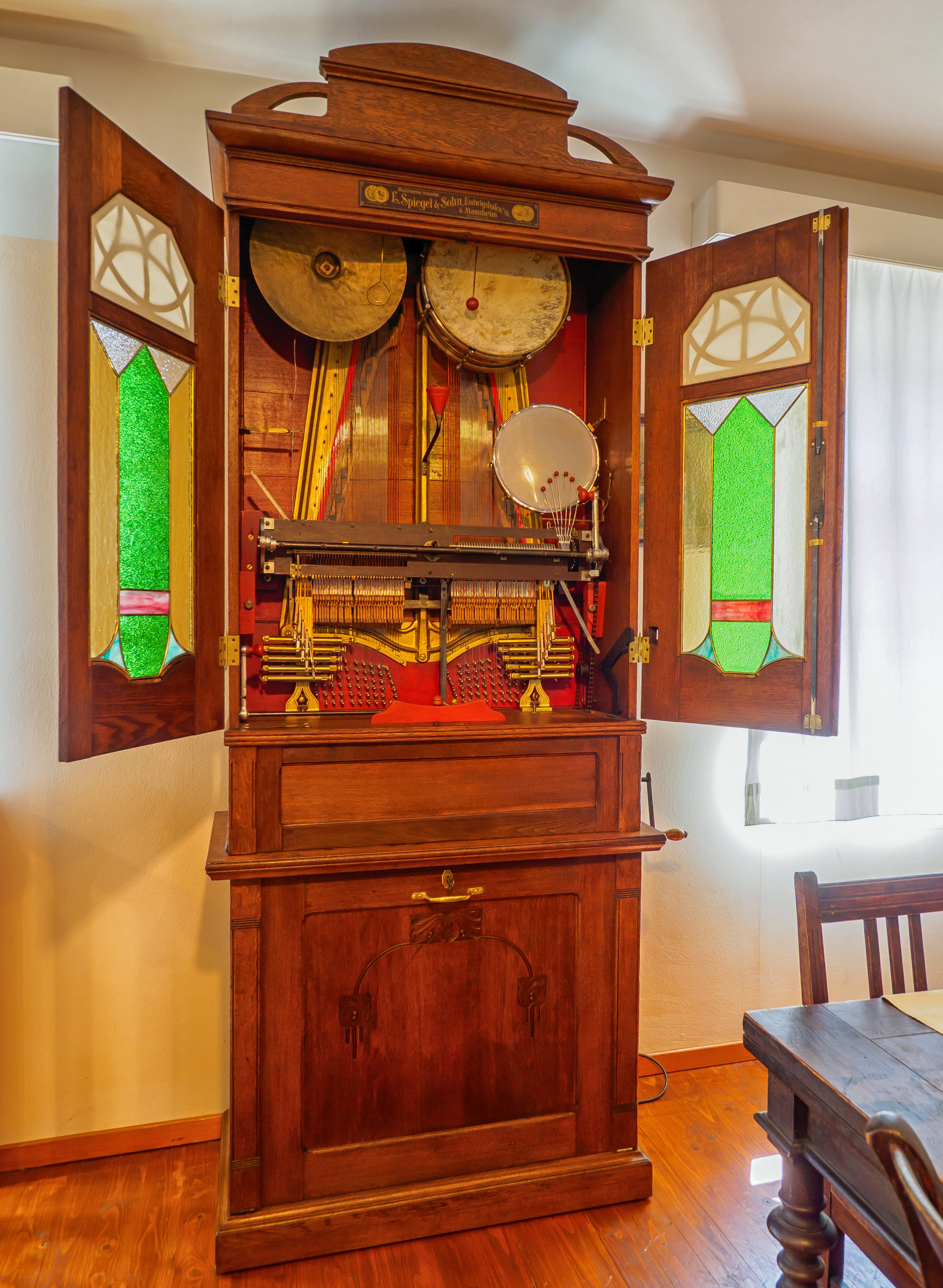
Orchestrion in the museum's permanent exhibition

The permanent exhibition on the first floor features several permanent installations:

- The corner shop comes from Ramstein, where it was in operation until the end of the 1960s. The complete interior, as well as goods and packaging from the mid-20th century, have been preserved.
- The herb chamber with laboratory comes from a pharmacy in Landstuhl and provides insights into the work of a pharmacist around 1900.
- The Biedermeier living room presents middle-class living conditions in the 18th and 19th centuries.
- The village tavern shows the furnishings of the former Scheuermann inn in Steinwenden, including iceboxes, old beer mugs and beer bottles. Since April 2025, there has also been an orchestrion here. The instrument, which also comes from the inn in Steinwenden, was lovingly restored by Thomas Hemm and is now fully functional again.

One room of the museum is dedicated to the themes of childhood and school life at the beginning of the 20th century. On display are doll's houses from middle-class nurseries, prams, poetry albums and objects from a village school.

Other exhibits deal with topics such as the history of peat cutting in the Westrich moorlands and the situation of miners from the Westrich region who worked in the mines of eastern Saarland between the mid-19th century and the end of mining in 2012.

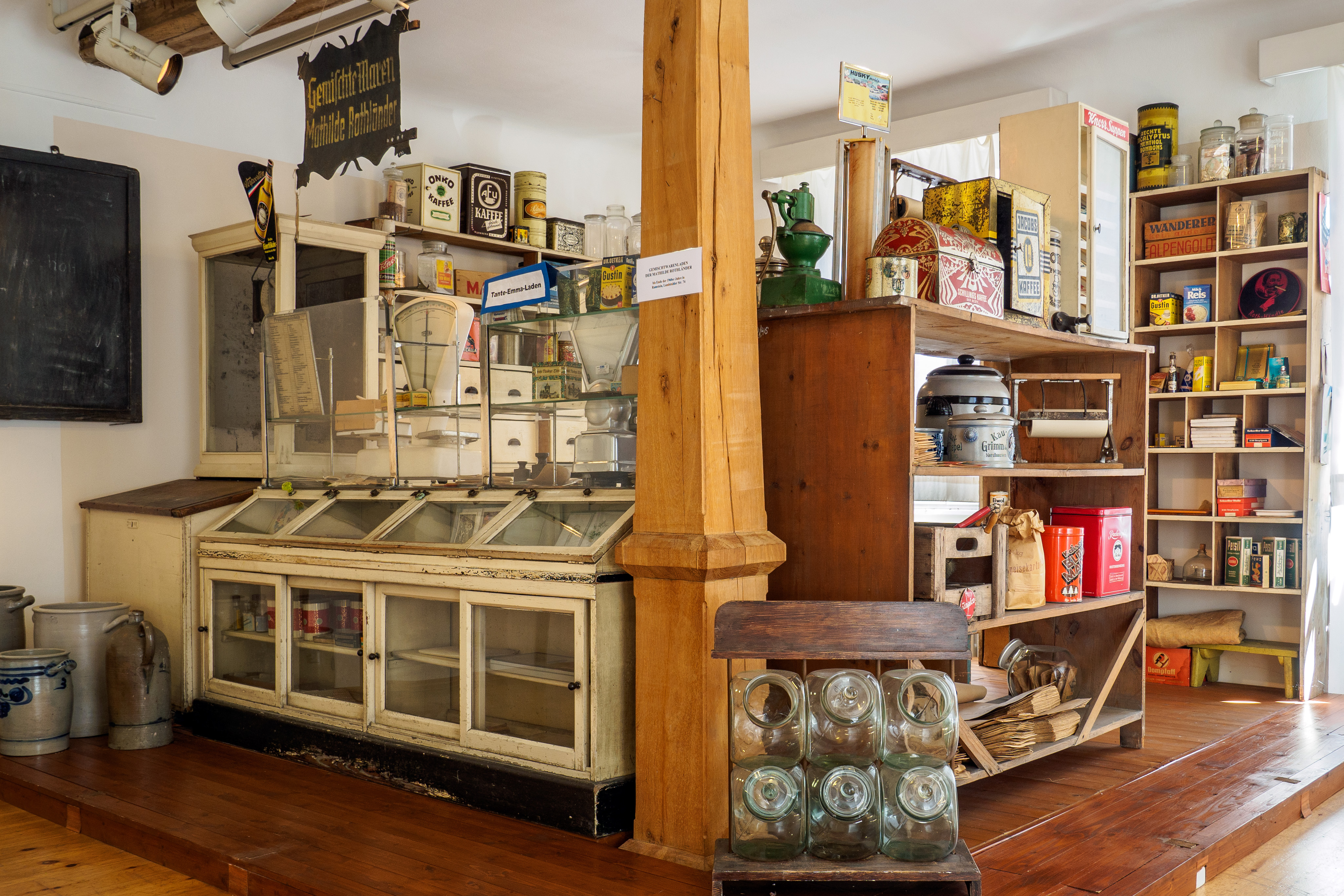
"Tante-Emma-Laden" (corner shop)

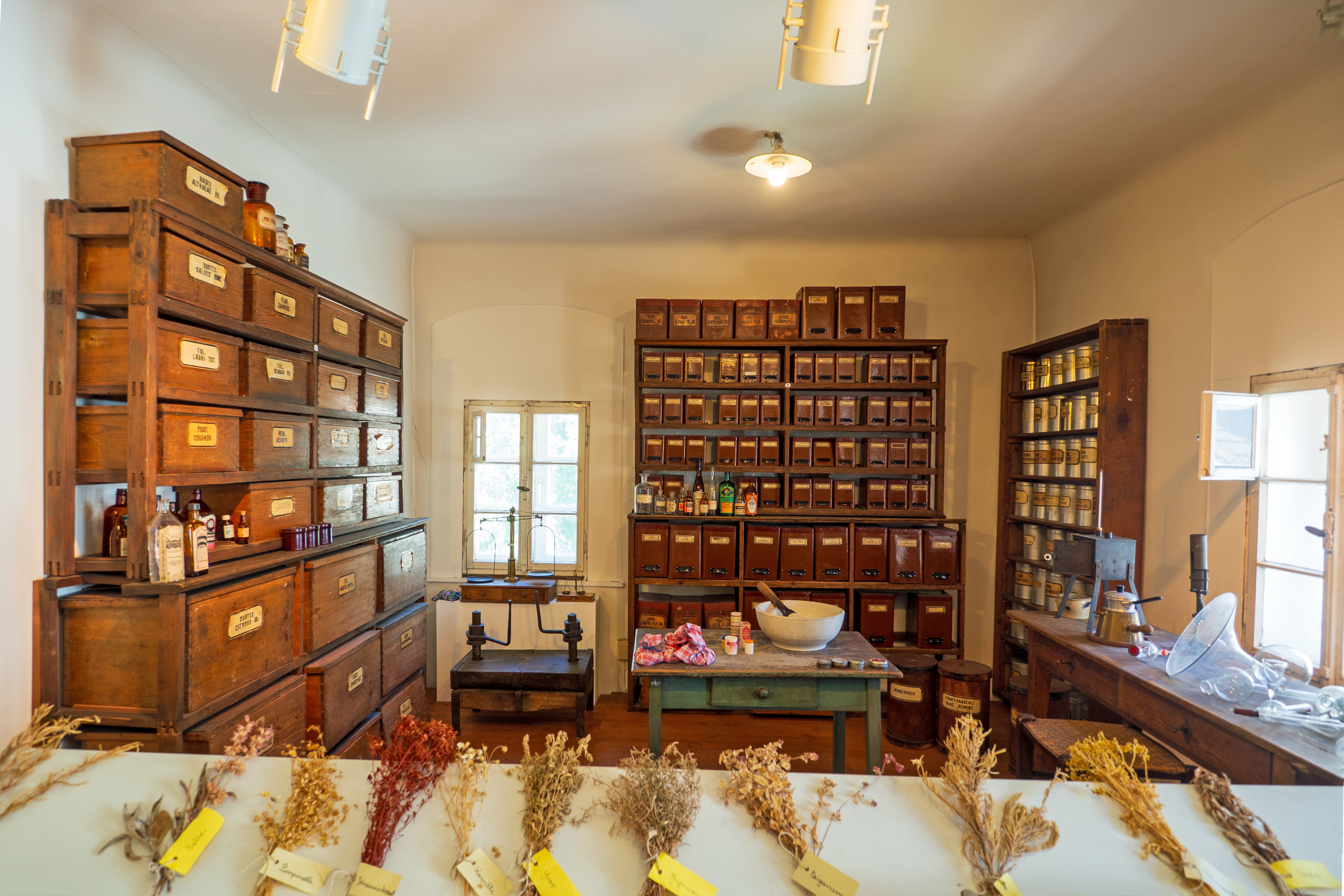
"Kräuterkammer" (herb chamber)

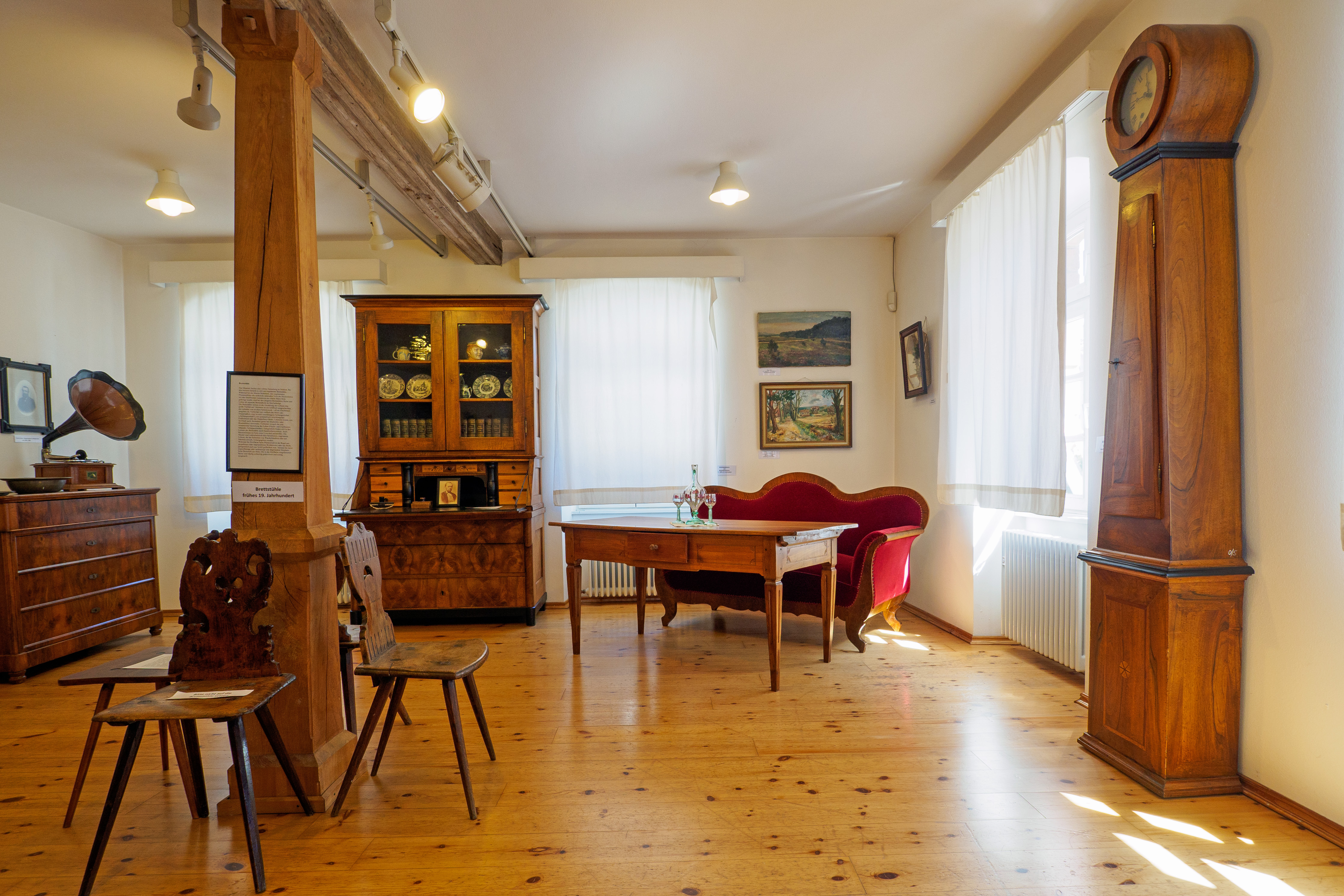
"Biedermeier-Wohnzimmer" (living room)

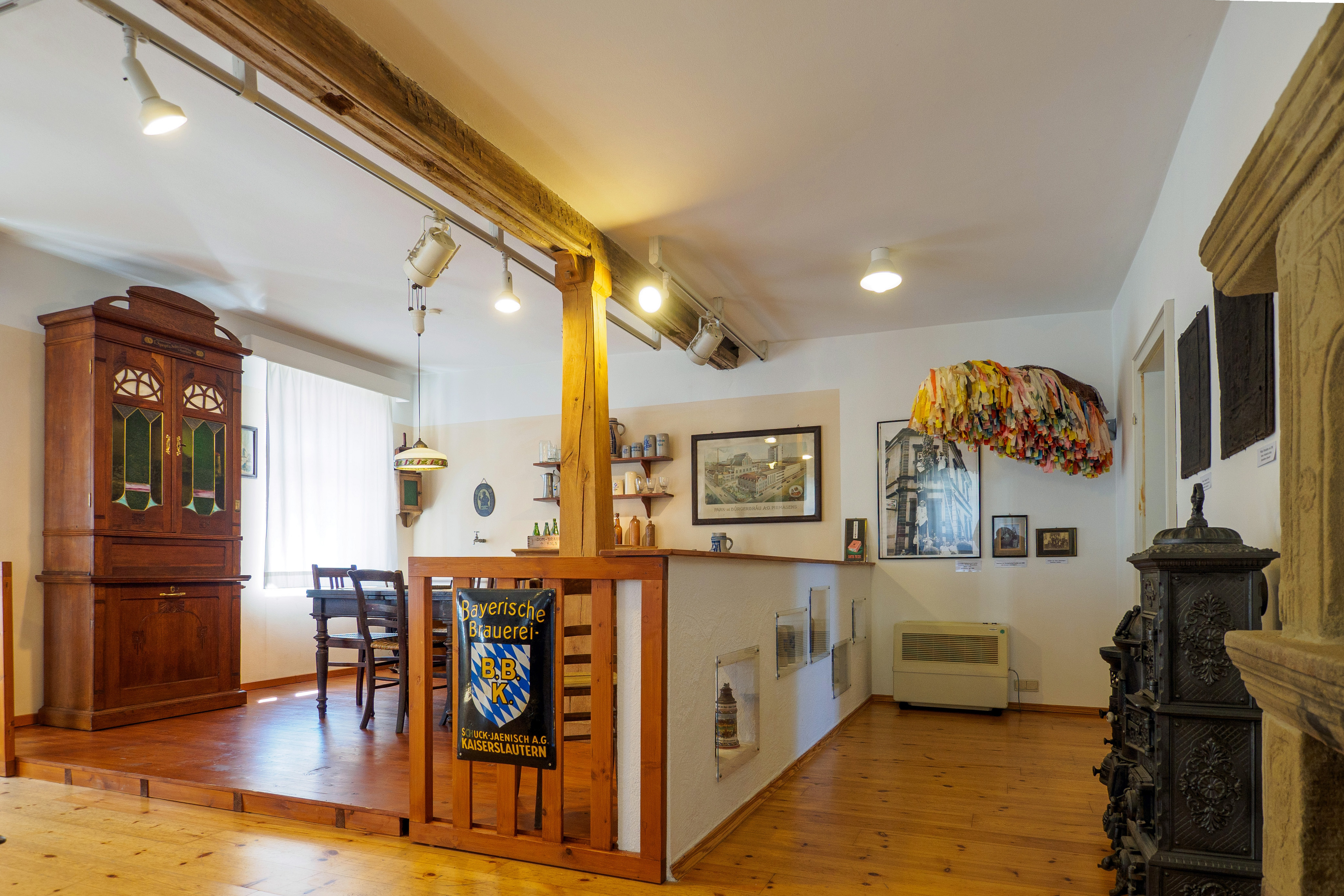
"Dorfwirtschaft" (village tavern)

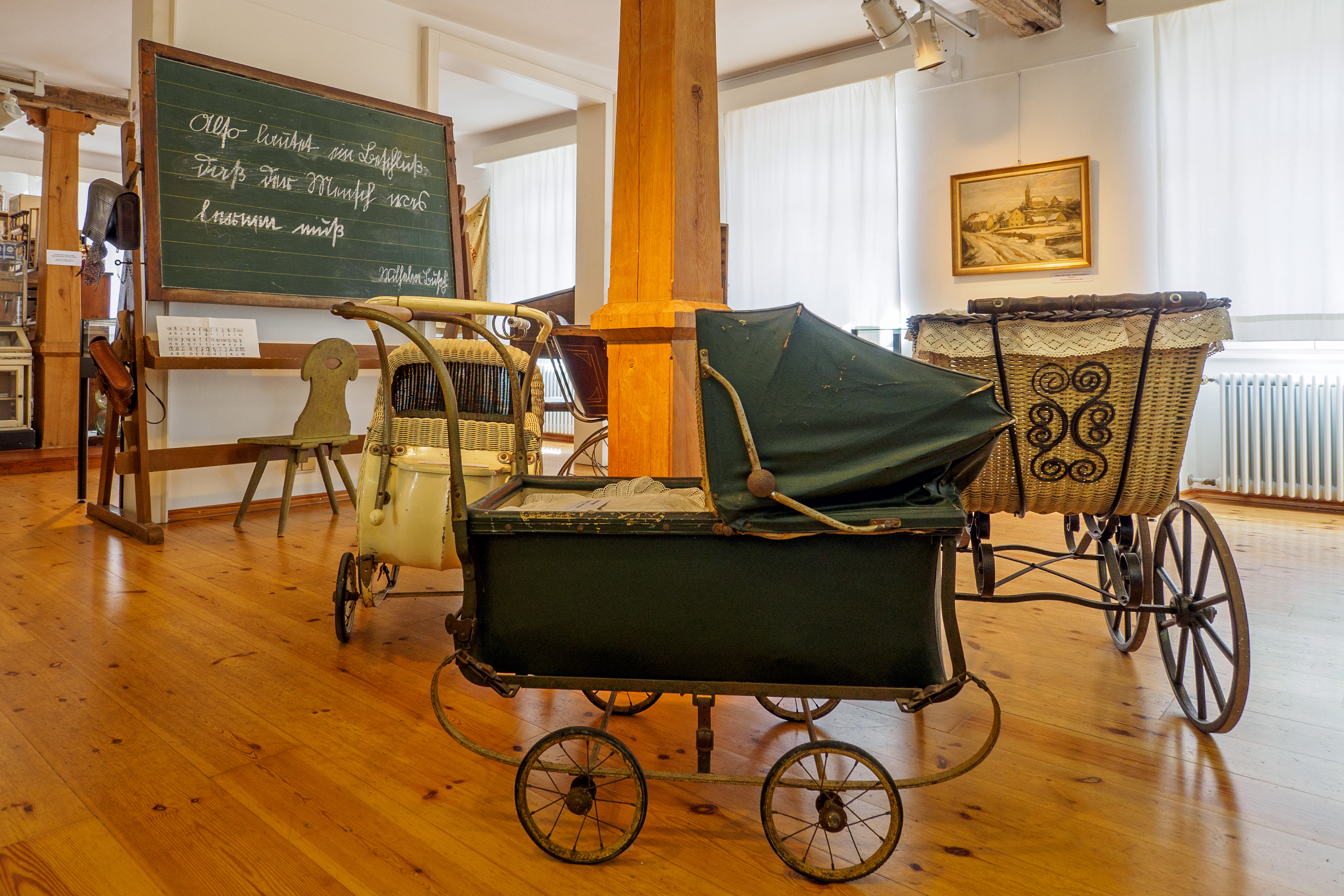
blackboard and pram

=== Special exhibitions ===
Since 1987, up to six special exhibitions have been presented annually on the ground floor of the museum, mostly on local historical events, people, customs and artistic works. In addition to regional history, these exhibitions also address current topics such as the role of sport and sports clubs in the integration of foreign citizens, Climatology in Antarctica and the effects of climate change on the Palatinate.
