= P82 =

P82 may refer to:

- Boulton Paul P.82 Defiant, a British interceptor aircraft
- HMAS Adroit (P 82), a patrol boat of the Royal Australian Navy
- HMS Upshot (P82), a submarine of the Royal Navy
- North American XP-82 Twin Mustang, an American fighter aircraft
- Papyrus 82, a biblical manuscript
- WM P82, a French sports prototype racing car
- P82, a state regional road in Latvia
