= Ramstein-Miesenbach =

- Town
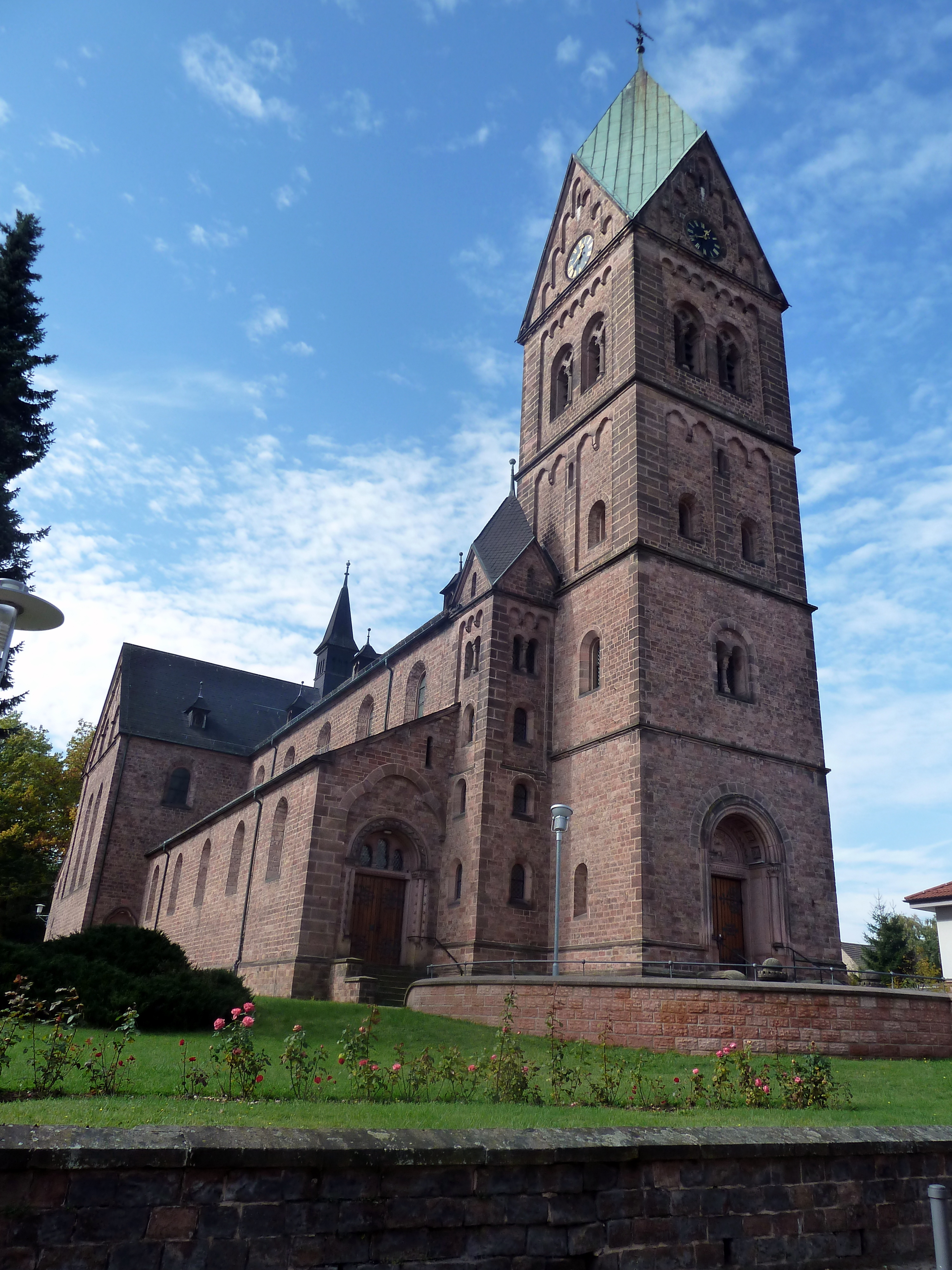
- Church of Saint Nicholas

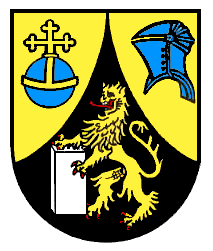
- Coat of arms

- Location of Ramstein-Miesenbach within Kaiserslautern district
- Interactive map of Ramstein-Miesenbach
- Location within Germany Location within Rhineland-Palatinate
- Coordinates: 49°26′46″N 7°33′17″E
- Country: Germany
- State: Rhineland-Palatinate
- District: Kaiserslautern
- Municipal assoc.: Ramstein-Miesenbach

Government
  - Mayor (2019–24): Ralf Hechler (CDU)

Area
  - Total: 43.01 km^{2} (16.61 sq mi)
- Elevation: 238 m (781 ft)

Population (2025-12-31)
  - Total: 7,607
  - Density: 176.9/km^{2} (458.1/sq mi)
- Time zone: UTC+01:00 (CET)
  - Summer (DST): UTC+02:00 (CEST)
- Postal codes: 66877
- Dialling codes: 06371
- Vehicle registration: KL
- Website: www.ramstein-miesenbach.de

Ramstein-Miesenbach (German pronunciation: [ˈʁamˌʃtaɪ̯n ˈmiːzn̩ˌbax]) is a town in the district of Kaiserslautern in Rhineland-Palatinate in Germany, adjacent to the U.S. Ramstein Air Base.

== History ==
As a result of the State of Rheinland-Pfalz administrative reform, Ramstein-Miesenbach, which has a population of approx. 9,200, was created on 7 June 1969 from the independent villages of Ramstein and Miesenbach. City designation was awarded in 1991. Ramstein-Miesenbach is the administrative center of the Verbandsgemeinde ("collective municipality") of Ramstein-Miesenbach which, with its approx. 19,100 inhabitants, is the largest Verbandsgemeinde in Kaiserslautern district.

=== Ramstein ===
During Roman times there was a village on the old east-west road north of the Western Palatinate swamps. Ceramic shards, coins and the remains of a Roman villa were found near "Unterschernauer" Mill, thus demonstrating that people have lived in this area since Roman times.

Ramstein is first mentioned in a document dated 2 June 1215. With this document Emperor Frederic II, the grandson of Emperor Frederic Barbarossa, gave to his knight Reinhard von Lautern the protector's rights of the Ramstein church along with its two subsidiary churches in Weilerbach and Spesbach. This knight's successor, Siegfried von Hohenecken, transferred the protectorate to the "Deutschorden" (Knights Order) in Einsiedeln, Switzerland.

In 1366 the knight Johannes von Ramstein lived in Ramstein. He served the counts of Veldenz and had his own court. In the 14th century Ramstein became part of the area under the Palatinate Elector.

In a document dated 18 October 1387 Ramstein was the center of the Ramstein court and administrative area. The village and the court belonged to the Lautern district. Court seals were found dated 1674 and 1774. After the invasion of the French in 1793 the court was dissolved. The Napoleonic Administrative Reform made Ramstein and Landstuhl into one mayoral district. Ramstein became its own mayoral entity in 1818.

Ramstein was almost completely depopulated in the Thirty Years War of the 17th century. Nine families settled in the area again in 1684. In 1802 there were 368 people in Ramstein. Economic hardship in the 1850s and 1860s forced many people to emigrate; however, by 1900 the population had grown again to 2000.

In addition to farming, peat harvesting became an important industry in the 18th and 19th century. After the railroad was built in 1868 many Ramstein men started working in the coal mines of the Saarland. The textile industry arrived in Ramstein in the 19th century. The former farming and artisan village slowly developed into an industrial community.

A significant economic and social event occurred in 1951 when the French built the Ramstein Air Base which today is the home of the Headquarters of the US Air Force Europe (USAFE) and the Component Command Air Headquarters Ramstein (CC-Air Ramstein). The City provided the base approximately one third of its 43 square kilometres of land. With about 1600 civilian employees the U.S. air base is the City's most important employer. There are some 8,200 military personnel stationed at Ramstein along with approx. 15,000 family members.

The beginning of Ramstein's modern industrial and business expansion began in the 1970s. The community had started developing a commercial area of about 0.66 km^{2} south-west of Ramstein where several businesses settled. The immediate vicinity has now developed into an industry and commerce park with a size of 0.93 km^{2}, the "Industriezentrum Westrich". North of the city center, along the rail line, a service center with artisan and trade businesses, the "Stutzenwald" business district, has emerged. The city is currently developing a new business district (In den Seufzen) on the road to Spesbach.

=== Miesenbach ===
Miesenbach's early history is similar to that of Ramstein. It was first mentioned in 1255 in a document which states that King William leased the "Villa de Mensinbach" to Count Conrad for 300 Cologne denares. Another document from 1274 mentions a "Machtolf de Mensenbach". Otto von Huneberg was given feudal tenure of a mansion in Miesenbach by the Counts of Bolanden. Miesenbach later belonged to the Palatinate Electorate and the court district of Steinwenden. It is assumed that the feudal lords in charge of Kaiserslautern Castle temporarily lived in the "House in Miesenbach", which is why a part of Miesenbach is still named "leisure park" (Lustgarten). Animal husbandry had a long tradition in Miesenbach where animal fairs were held regularly. Miesenbach was also the home of several well-known musicians. Today Miesenbach is mainly a bedroom community. Its residents work in Ramstein or for companies in Landstuhl, Kaiserslautern, the Air Base, the neighboring state of Saarland or other parts of Rheinland-Pfalz.

== Local council ==
The local council in Ramstein-Miesenbach has 24 members. The elections in May 2014 showed the following results:

Election	SPD	CDU	FWG	Total
2014	5	13	6	24 Seats
2009	5	14	5	24 Seats
2004	5	15	4	24 Seats

- FWG: Freie Wählergruppe (Free voters) Stadt Ramstein-Miesenbach

== Ramstein-Miesenbach today ==
The city has all levels of schools as well as a number of private clubs, organizations and Volkshochschule which offers opportunities for educational and recreational activities in multiple languages.

The "Haus des Bürgers", Ramstein's cultural and conference center, is host to numerous national and international stars every year. The facility, which was completed in 1986, is also available for conferences and meetings and houses the city library.

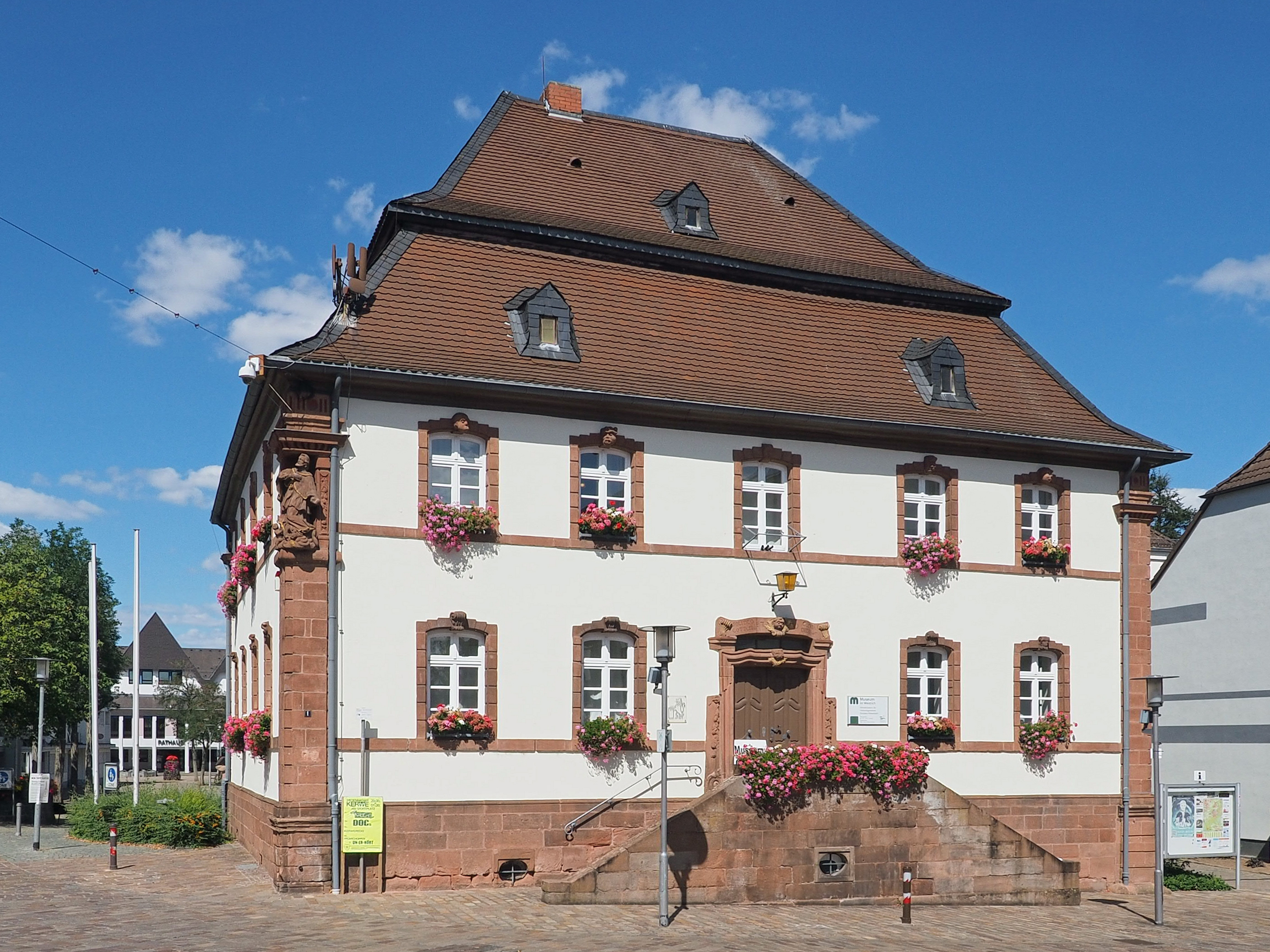
Museum im Westrich

The "Museum im Westrich" is the local history museum, which is located in the old 1750 city hall. The museum hosts a permanent collection of cultural items and regularly features special exhibits.

The AZUR Water World swimmingpool is one of the most popular attractions in the region and provides year-round indoor/outdoor water recreation for all ages.

The "Kurpfalz" Scout Center is a regular host to boy scouts and girl scouts from all over Germany. The "Seewoog" lakeside recreational area provides rest and relaxation for everyone.

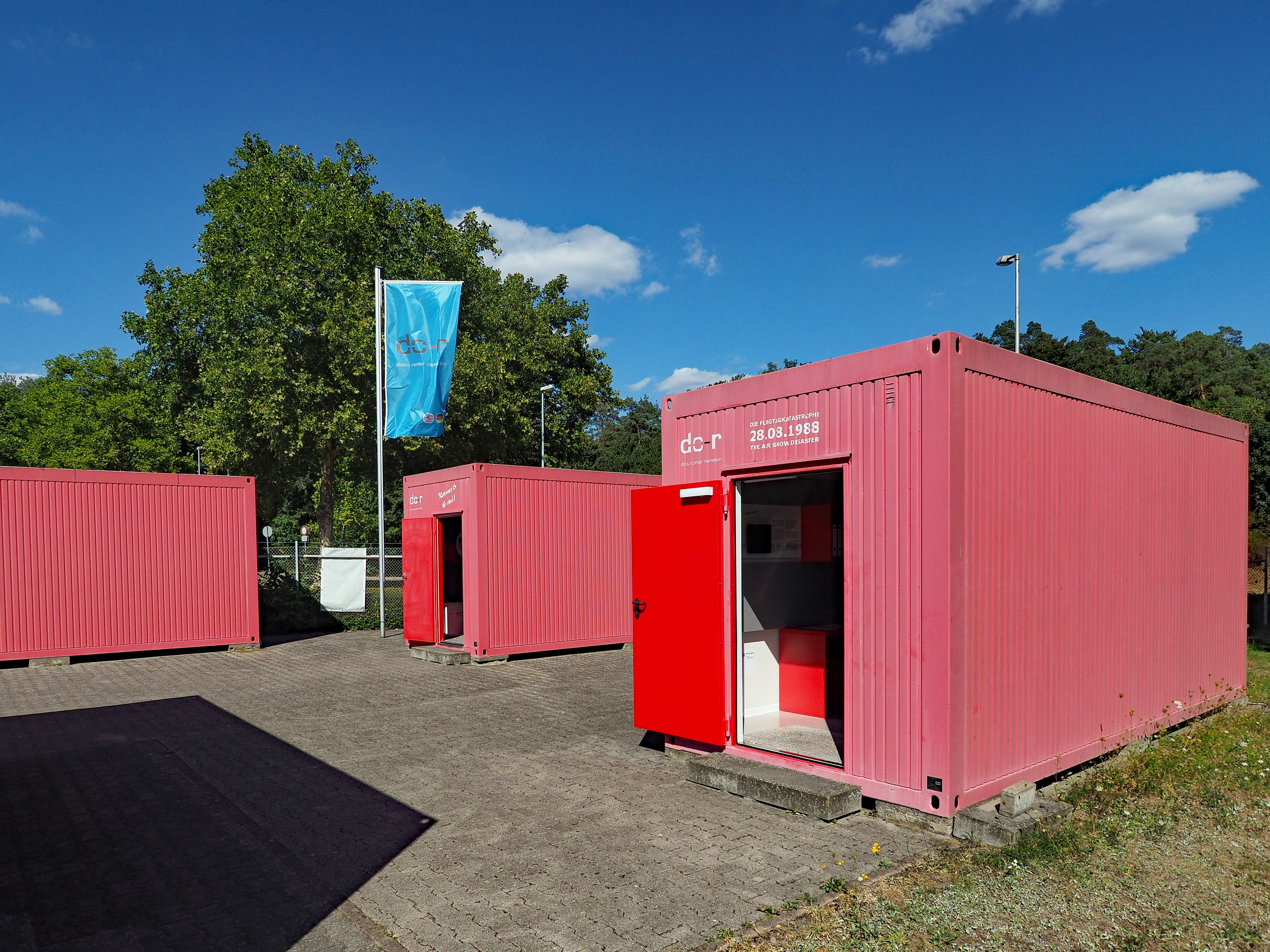
Docu Center Ramstein

The "Center for Documentation and Exhibition of the History of US Americans in the Rhineland Palatinate" is dedicated to the scientific analysis and communication of the presence of the United States Armed Forces in Rhineland-Palatinate.

== Climate ==
Climate in this area has mild differences between highs and lows, and there is adequate rainfall year-round. The Köppen Climate Classification subtype for this climate is "Cfb" (Marine West Coast Climate/Oceanic climate).

Climate data for Ramstein-Miesenbach
Month	Jan	Feb	Mar	Apr	May	Jun	Jul	Aug	Sep	Oct	Nov	Dec	Year
Mean daily maximum °C (°F)	2 (35)	4 (39)	9 (48)	14 (57)	18 (64)	21 (69)	23 (73)	22 (71)	19 (66)	14 (57)	7 (44)	3 (37)	13 (55)
Mean daily minimum °C (°F)	−3 (26)	−2 (28)	0 (32)	2 (35)	5 (41)	9 (48)	11 (51)	10 (50)	7 (44)	4 (39)	1 (33)	−1 (30)	3 (37)
Average precipitation mm (inches)	53 (2.1)	46 (1.8)	41 (1.6)	41 (1.6)	48 (1.9)	66 (2.6)	58 (2.3)	74 (2.9)	58 (2.3)	46 (1.8)	51 (2)	64 (2.5)	640 (25.3)
Source: Weatherbase

== See also ==
- Ramstein airshow disaster
- Rammstein for the band with similar name.
