= Uncial 0207 =

- New Testament manuscript
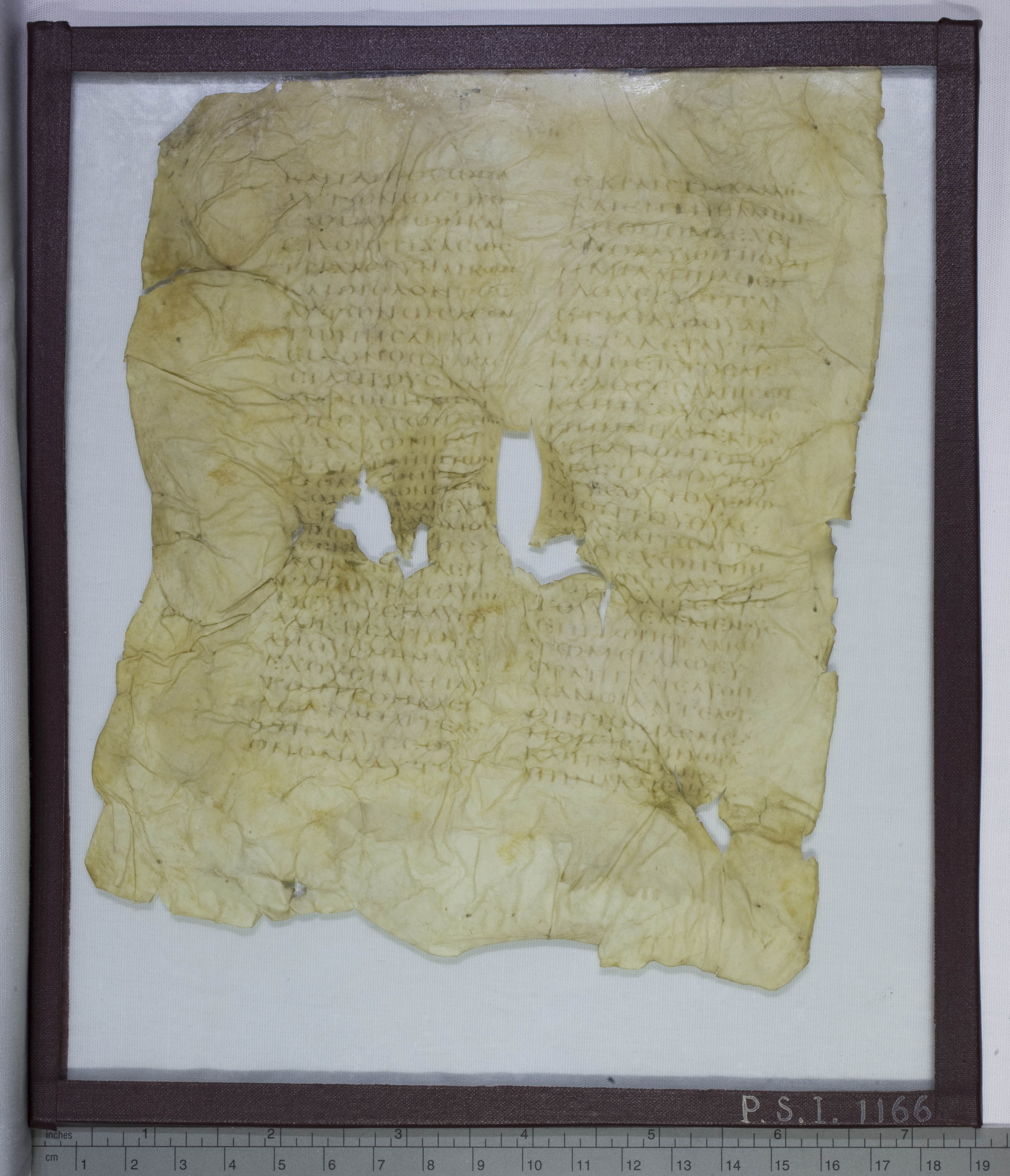
- Side recto
- Text: Book of Revelation 9:2-15
- Date: 4th-century
- Script: Greek
- Now at: Laurentian Library
- Size: 19 x 15 cm
- Type: Alexandrian text-type
- Category: III

Uncial 0207 (in the Gregory-Aland numbering), is a Greek uncial manuscript of the New Testament, dated paleographically to the 4th-century.

== Description ==
The codex contains small parts of the Book of Revelation 9:2-15, on one parchment leaf (19 cm by 15 cm). The text is written in two columns per page, 29 lines per page, in small uncial letters. The leaf is paginated (no 478).

The text-type of this codex is a representative of the Alexandrian text-type with numerous alien readings. Aland placed it in Category III.

Currently it is dated by the INTF to the 4th century.

The manuscript was added to the list of the New Testament manuscripts by Ernst von Dobschütz in 1933.

The manuscript was found in Egypt. Mario Naldini published its facsimile.

The codex currently is housed at the Laurentian Library (PSI 1166) in Florence.

== See also ==
- List of New Testament uncials
- Textual criticism
