= Docu Center Ramstein =

Coordinates: 49°26′53.992″N 7°33′59.386″E

- Dokumentations- und Ausstellungszentrum zur Geschichte der US-Amerikaner in Rheinland-Pfalz
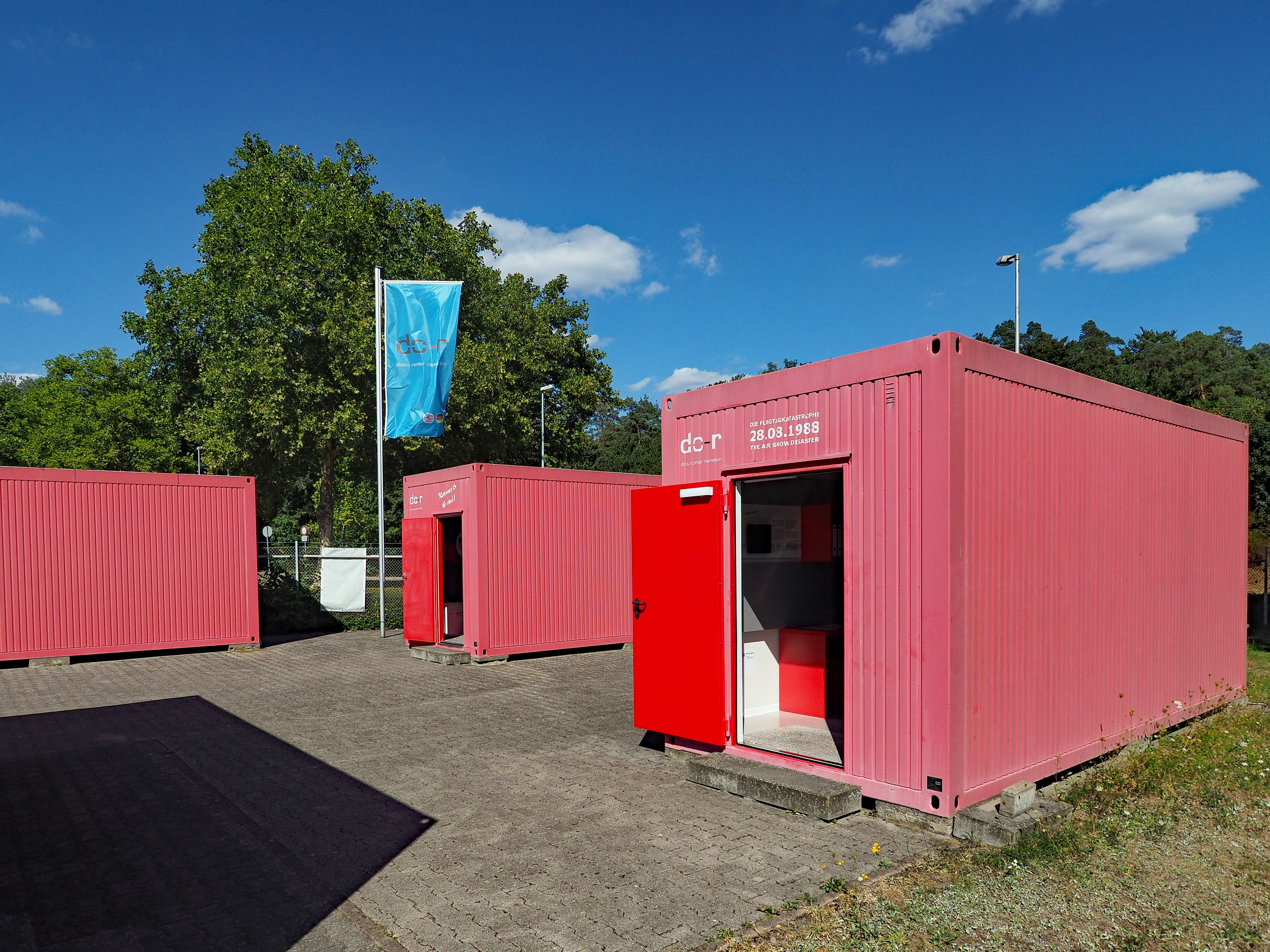
- Docu Center Ramstein
- Established: 2007
- Location: Schernauer Straße 46, 66877 Ramstein-Miesenbach, Rheinland-Pfalz, Germany
- Type: Documentation centre and contemporary history museum
- Key holdings: Historic guardhouse; archives; photo collections
- Collection size: History of the U.S. military in Rhineland-Palatinate
- Founder: Municipality of Ramstein-Miesenbach
- Owner: Docu Center Ramstein (supported by the Rhineland-Palatinate state government)
- Website: www.dc-ramstein.de

The Center for Documentation and Exhibition of the History of US Americans in the Rhineland Palatinate, or Docu Center Ramstein (DCR) for short, is dedicated to the scientific analysis and communication of the presence of the US military in Rhineland-Palatinate, particularly in the district of Kaiserslautern. In September 2025, the DCR was honoured with the ‘Museum of the Month’ award by the Rhineland-Palatinate Ministry for Family, Women, Culture and Integration.

== History ==
On 7 November 2007, the Ramstein-Miesenbach municipal council unanimously approved the establishment of the DCR. Since then, documents, objects and information have been collected and scientifically evaluated here. The state government of Rhineland-Palatinate provided financial and conceptual support for the establishment of the facility. In 2013, a container village was opened at Schernauer Straße 46 in Ramstein-Miesenbach, where a permanent exhibition and regularly changing special exhibitions are presented.

== Archives ==
The Docu Centre collects all materials and further information on the history of Americans in Rhineland-Palatinate in several archives. These are available to both researchers and the general public for research purposes.

- The chronologically organised newspaper archive contains articles and press releases from regional and national newspapers and magazines. One focus is on newspapers from US American locations such as Worms, Sembach and Kaiserslautern.
- The location archive contains information on the history of all existing and abandoned US American military bases in Rhineland-Palatinate.
- The library holds academic literature on the history of Americans in Rhineland-Palatinate.
- The photo archive contains professional and private photographs of everyday life and official events involving Americans and German-American coexistence.
- The contemporary witness archive collects memories and reports from contemporary witnesses in the form of audio and film recordings of interviews.

== Collections ==
The Docu Centre's collections contain objects that provide insights into the history of Americans in Rhineland-Palatinate. These include ammunition boxes, signs, uniforms and pins. The largest object is the guardhouse, which is part of the permanent exhibition. Of the more than 4,450 objects recorded, more than 1,550 are generally available on the Internet on the museum portal museum-digital.de.

== Exhibition ==
=== Permanent exhibition ===
The museum's permanent exhibition consists of three containers, each dedicated to a specific theme:

The first container, called ‘Infotainer’, presents German-American history using the example of the Kaiserslautern region from 1950 onwards.

The second container is entitled ‘Welcome to the Club’. It shows the importance of American clubs, especially the NCO Club, for the cultural development of the region in the period after the Second World War. The abbreviation NCO stands for Non Commissioned Officer, so it was a club for non-commissioned officers.

The third container documents the Ramstein air show disaster on 28 August 1988 in film and text contributions. It also looks at the individual fates of the victims.

Next to the containers stands the original guardhouse from the former US settlement on Fliegerstraße in Kaiserslautern. It was used by the security personnel of the general's villa there and was transported to Ramstein in 2011 after the settlement was abandoned.

The entire exhibition is documented in two languages (German and English).

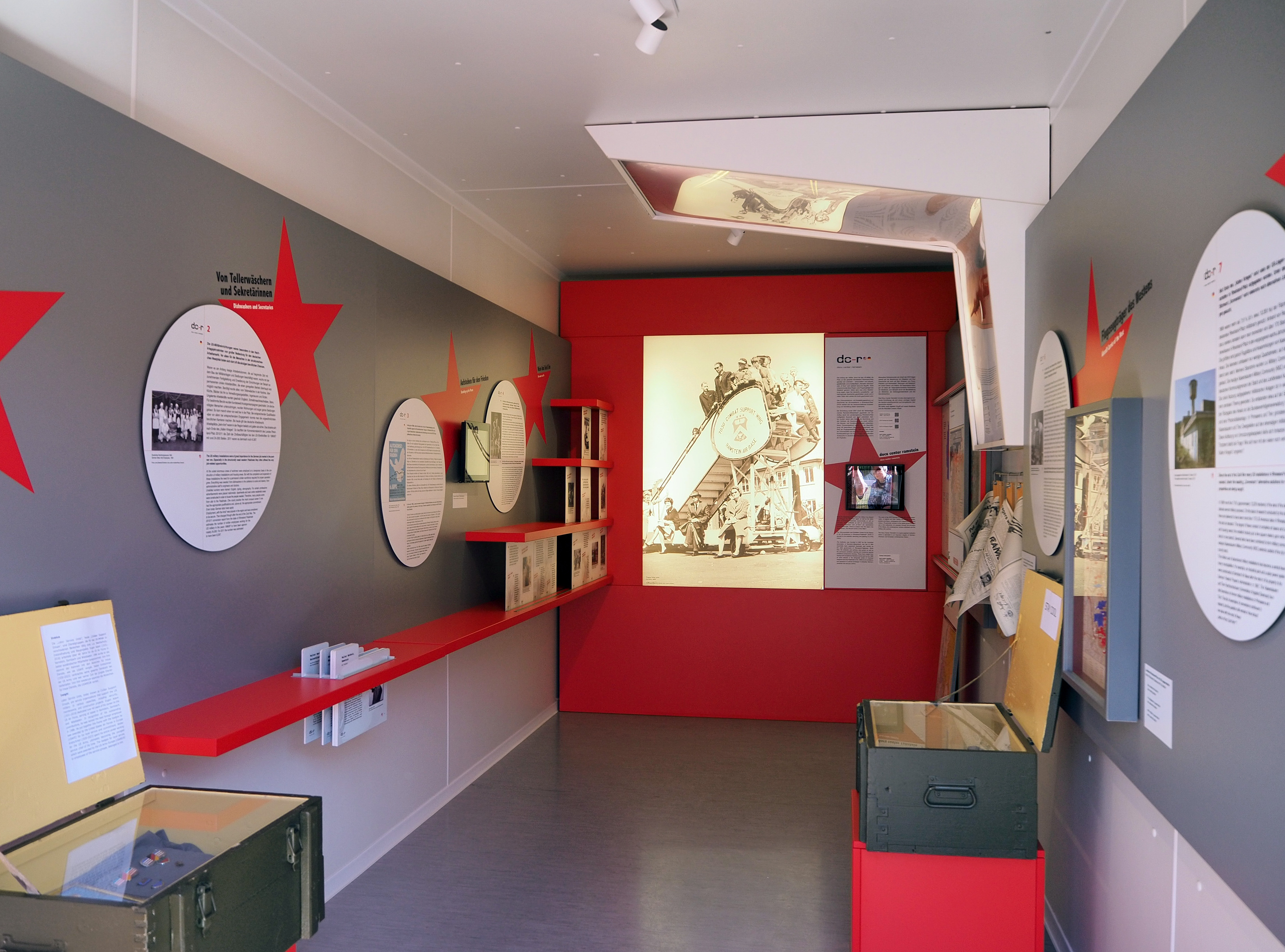
Container 1

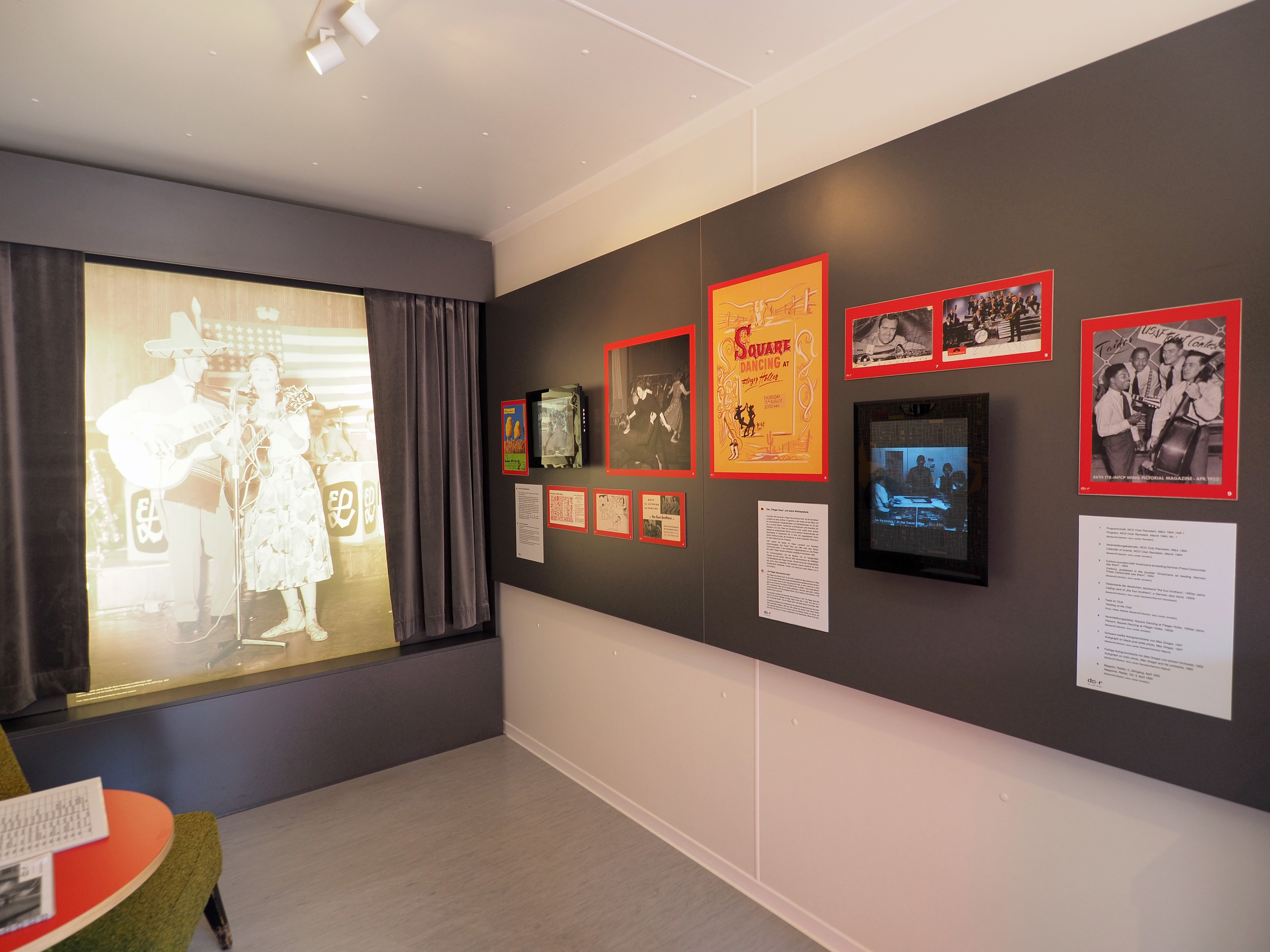
Container 2

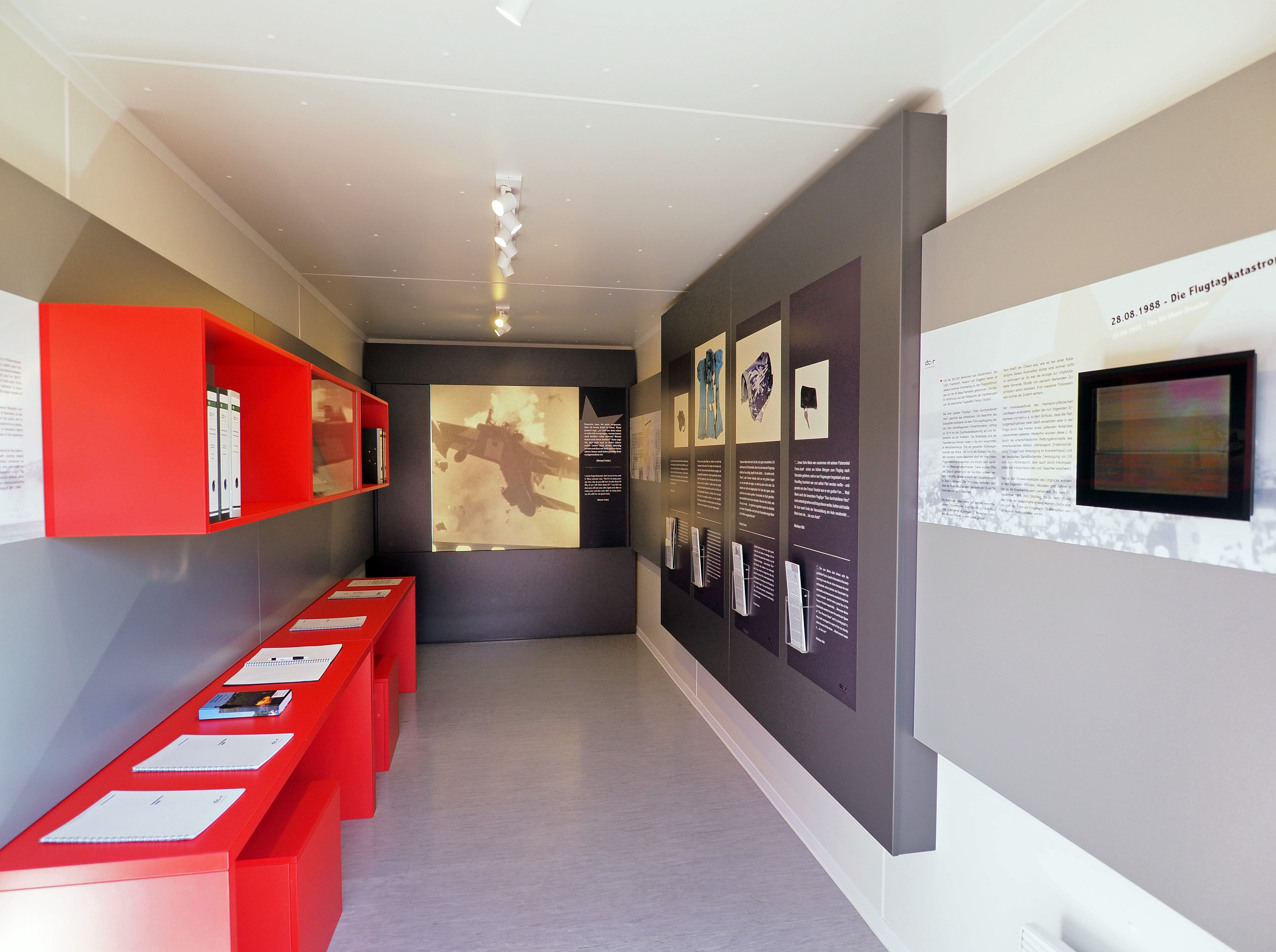
Container 3

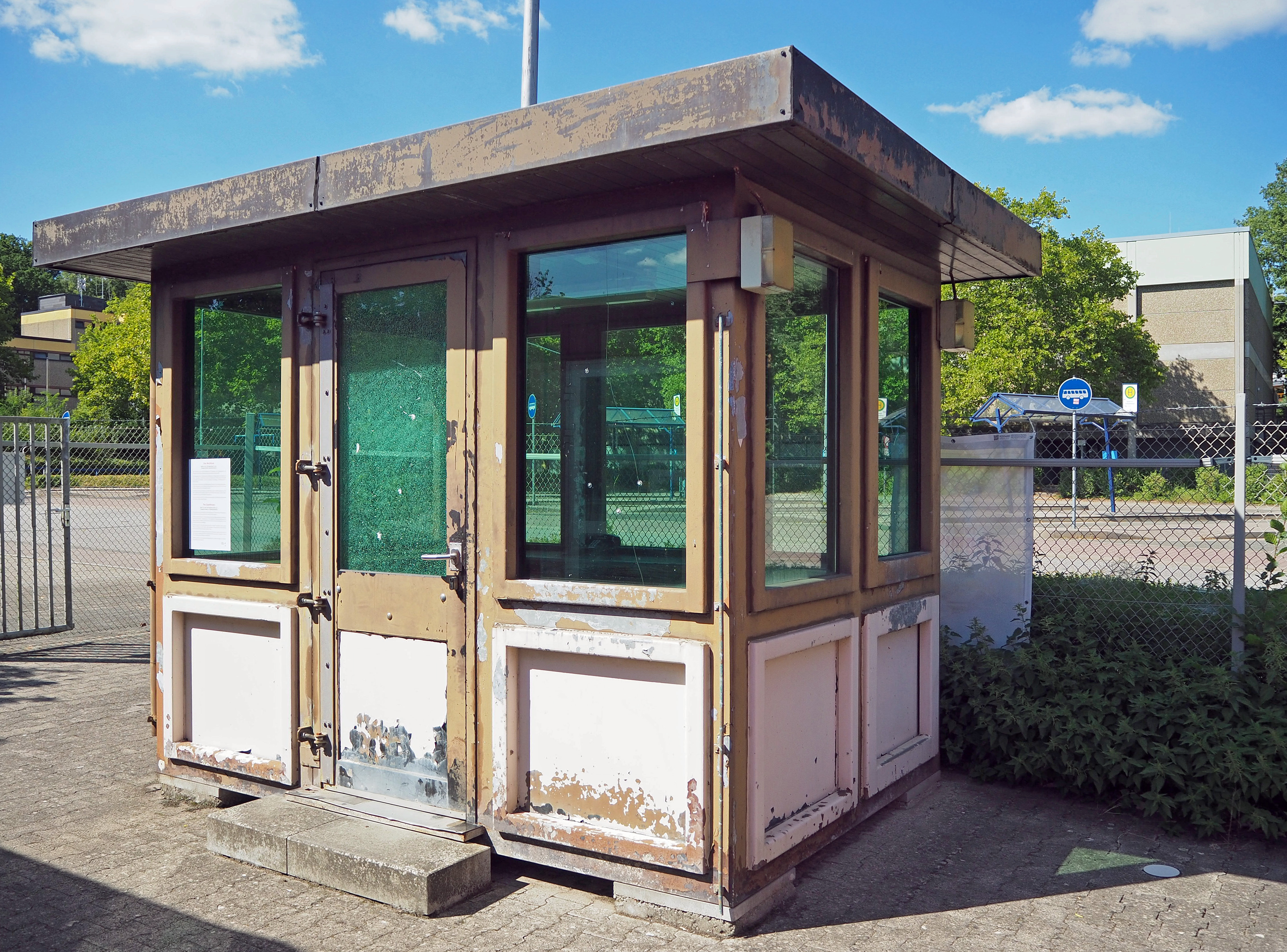
Guardhouse

=== Special exhibitions (selection) ===
The DCR regularly presents special exhibitions on various topics. For each exhibition, themed exhibits are selected from the archives and collection and displayed in an additional container. The special exhibitions are usually accompanied by a programme of events and a publication. Some of the publications are available for download on the DCR website for an extended period of time.

- 2008: 28.08.88 – 28.08.08: Der 20. Jahrestag einer Katastrophe / The 20th Anniversary of a Tragedy
- 2009: Hinterm Zaun – 60 Jahre US-Munitionsdepot Miesau / Behind the fence – 60 years of the US ammunition depot in Miesau
- 2010: Operation Lindwurm – eine öffentlich durchgeführte geheime Aktion / Operation Steel Box – a secret operation carried out in public
- 2011: 60 Jahre US-Depot Germersheim: Als „Uncle Sam“ in die Rheinstadt kam / 60 years of the US depot in Germersheim: When Uncle Sam came to the town on the Rhine
- 2011: Die Plakate des Herrn Lesmeister / The posters of Mr Lesmeister
- 2012: Lost in Space – Relikte des Kalten Krieges – Nr.1 / Relics of the Cold War – No. 1
- 2012: Mein Ami – 60 Jahre U.S. Air Force in Rheinland-Pfalz / 60 years of the U.S. Air Force in Rhineland-Palatinate
- 2017: „Max Greger swingt die Ami-Clubs“ / Max Greger swings the American clubs
- 2018: AMIPFALZ – Zwei Perspektiven... Two Perspectives..
- 2021: Hängengeblieben – Stayed –
- 2022: „Things You Should Know“ – 70 Jahre Air Base Ramstein / 70 years of Ramstein Air Base
- 2023: Football ≠ Fußball
- 2024: „1983: Kalter Krieg und Heißer Herbst“ / 1983: Cold War and Hot Autumn
- 2024: „Fliegerstrasse, Blutacker und ‚Amiwissje‘ - Bilder und Geschichten über eine US-Siedlung in Kaiserslautern“ / Pictures and stories about a US settlement in Kaiserslautern
- 2024: „Aufgeklappt und Abgestempelt“ / ‘Opened and stamped’
- 2025: Berliner Luftbrücke – Schutz für die Rosinenbomber / Berlin Airlift – Protection for the Raisin Bombers
- 2025: Housing – Wohnungswechsel
