= Kottweiler-Schwanden =

- Municipality
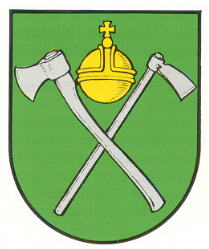
- Coat of arms

- Location of Kottweiler-Schwanden within Kaiserslautern district
- Interactive map of Kottweiler-Schwanden
- Location within Germany Location within Rhineland-Palatinate
- Coordinates: 49°28′29″N 7°32′14″E
- Country: Germany
- State: Rhineland-Palatinate
- District: Kaiserslautern
- Municipal assoc.: Ramstein-Miesenbach
- Subdivisions: 2

Government
  - Mayor (2019–24): Gabriele Schütz

Area
  - Total: 7.61 km^{2} (2.94 sq mi)
- Elevation: 262 m (860 ft)

Population (2025-12-31)
  - Total: 1,318
  - Density: 173/km^{2} (449/sq mi)
- Time zone: UTC+01:00 (CET)
  - Summer (DST): UTC+02:00 (CEST)
- Postal codes: 66879
- Dialling codes: 06371
- Vehicle registration: KL

Kottweiler-Schwanden (German pronunciation: [ˈkɔtvaɪlɐ ˈʃvandn̩]) is a municipality in the district of Kaiserslautern, in Rhineland-Palatinate, western Germany.
