= Papyrus 85 =

Papyrus 𝔓^{85}
- New Testament manuscript
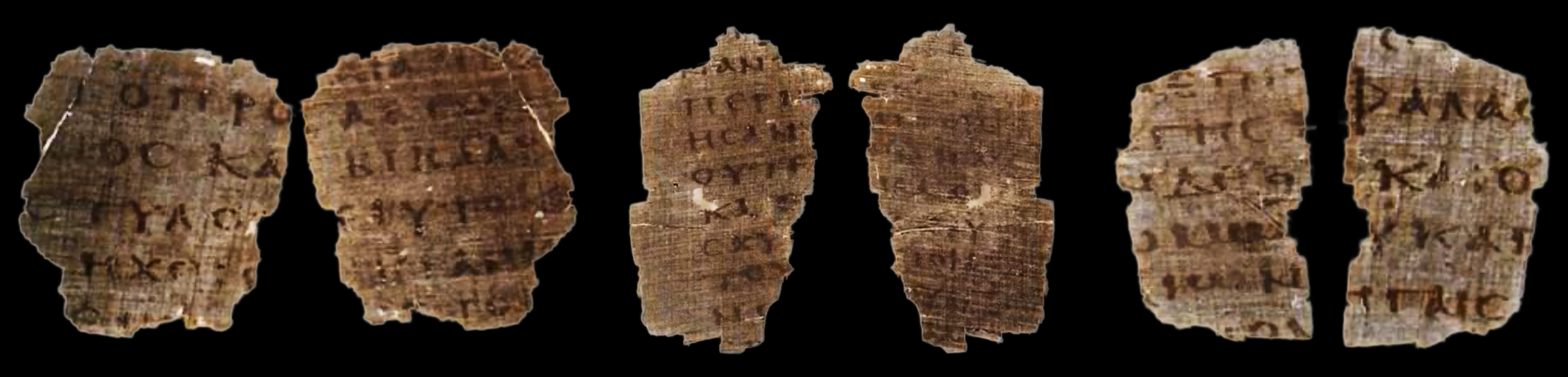
- Left to right: Fragment 1 recto, Rev 9:19-20; fragment 1 verso, 10:5-6; fragment 2 recto 10:7-8; fragment 2 verso, Rev 9:20-10:1; fragment 3 verso, Rev 10:9; fragment 3 recto Rev 10:1-2
- Text: Book of Revelation 9-10 †
- Date: 4th / 5th century
- Script: Greek
- Found: Egypt
- Now at: Bibliothèque nationale et universitaire
- Cite: J. Schwartz, Papyrus et tradition manuscrite, ZPE 4 (Bonn: 1969), pp. 178-182.
- Type: Alexandrian text-type
- Category: II

Papyrus 85 (in the Gregory-Aland numbering), designated by 𝔓^{85}, is an early copy of the New Testament in Greek. It is a papyrus manuscript of the Book of Revelation. The manuscript paleographically has been assigned to the 4th century (or the 5th century).

The surviving texts of Revelation are verses 9:19-10:2,5-9.

Text

The Greek text of this codex is a representative of the Alexandrian text-type. Aland placed it in Category II.

Location

It is currently housed at the Bibliothèque nationale et universitaire (P. Gr. 1028) in Strasbourg.

== See also ==
- List of New Testament papyri
- Papyrus 82
