= Uncial 052 =

- New Testament manuscript
- Name: Codex Athous Panteleimon
- Text: Revelation of John
- Date: 10th century
- Script: Greek
- Now at: Monastery of St Panteleimon
- Size: 29.5 × 23 cm
- Type: Byzantine text-type
- Category: V

Codex Athous Panteleimon, designated by 052 (in the Gregory-Aland numbering), and known as Uncial 052, is a Greek uncial manuscript of the New Testament. It is dated paleographically to the 10th century.

== Description ==
The codex contains incomplete text of Revelation of John (7:16–8:12), with a commentary of Andreas's (see Uncial 051), on four parchment leaves (29.5 by 23 cm). The text was written in two columns per page, 27 lines per page.

The text is divided according to the κεφαλαια (chapters), whose numbers are given at the margins, and the τιτλοι (titles of chapters) at the top of the pages. There is also another division according to the λογοι.

The Greek text of this codex is a representative of the Byzantine text-type. Aland placed it in Category V. The text was collated and edited by Herman C. Hoskier.

Currently it is dated by the INTF to the 10th century.

The codex is located on Mount Athos in the library of the Monastery of St Panteleimon (99,2).

== See also ==
- List of New Testament uncials
- Textual criticism
