= Steinwenden =

- Municipality
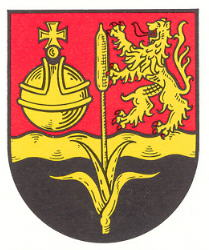
- Coat of arms

- Location of Steinwenden within Kaiserslautern district
- Interactive map of Steinwenden
- Location within Germany Location within Rhineland-Palatinate
- Coordinates: 49°27′21″N 7°31′36″E
- Country: Germany
- State: Rhineland-Palatinate
- District: Kaiserslautern
- Municipal assoc.: Ramstein-Miesenbach
- Subdivisions: 3

Government
  - Mayor (2019–24): Matthias Huber (CDU)

Area
  - Total: 11.84 km^{2} (4.57 sq mi)
- Elevation: 242 m (794 ft)

Population (2025-12-31)
  - Total: 2,405
  - Density: 203.1/km^{2} (526.1/sq mi)
- Time zone: UTC+01:00 (CET)
  - Summer (DST): UTC+02:00 (CEST)
- Postal codes: 66879
- Dialling codes: 06371
- Vehicle registration: KL
- Website: www.steinwenden.de

Steinwenden (German pronunciation: [ˈʃtaɪnvɛndn̩]) is a municipality in the district of Kaiserslautern, in Rhineland-Palatinate, western Germany.

Notable people from Steinwenden include Carl David Maria Weber.
