= Uncial 0163 =

- New Testament manuscript
- Name: P. Oxy. 848
- Text: Revelation 16:17-20
- Date: 5th century
- Script: Greek
- Found: Al-Bashnasa
- Now at: University of Chicago Oriental Institute
- Cite: B. P. Grenfell & A. S. Hunt, OP VI, p. 6.
- Size: 12 x 8.5 cm
- Type: Alexandrian text-type
- Category: III
- Note: concurs with codex A

Uncial 0163 (in the Gregory-Aland numbering), is a Greek uncial manuscript of the New Testament, dated palaeographically to the 5th century.

== Description ==
The codex contains a small part of the Book of Revelation 16:17-20, on one parchment leaf (12 cm by 8.5 cm). It is written in one column per page, 17 lines per page, in small uncial letters.

The Greek text of this codex is a representative of the Alexandrian text-type. Aland placed it in Category III. The surviving fragment of text concurs with Codex Alexandrinus.

== History ==
Currently it is dated by the INTF to the 5th century.

The manuscript was found in Al-Bashnasa.

Text of the manuscript was published in 1908 by B. P. Grenfell and A. S. Hunt.

The codex currently is housed at the University of Chicago Oriental Institute (9351) (P. Oxy 848) in Chicago.

== See also ==
- List of New Testament uncials
- Oxyrhynchus Papyri
- Textual criticism
- Papyrus Oxyrhynchus 847
- Papyrus Oxyrhynchus 849
