= Ramstein-Miesenbach (Verbandsgemeinde) =

Municipality in Rhineland-Palatinate, Germany

- Verbandsgemeinde
- Location of Ramstein-Miesenbach within Kaiserslautern district
- Interactive map of Ramstein-Miesenbach
- Location within Germany Location within Rhineland-Palatinate
- Coordinates: 49°27′N 7°33′E
- Country: Germany
- State: Rhineland-Palatinate
- District: Kaiserslautern
- Seat: Ramstein-Miesenbach
- Subdivisions: 5 municipalities

Area
  - Total: 92.61 km^{2} (35.76 sq mi)

Population (2025-12-31)
  - Total: 16,729
  - Density: 180.6/km^{2} (467.9/sq mi)
- Time zone: UTC+01:00 (CET)
  - Summer (DST): UTC+02:00 (CEST)
- Website: www.ramstein-miesenbach.de

Ramstein-Miesenbach is a Verbandsgemeinde ("collective municipality") in the district of Kaiserslautern, Rhineland-Palatinate, Germany. The seat of the Verbandsgemeinde is in Ramstein-Miesenbach.

The Verbandsgemeinde Ramstein-Miesenbach consists of the following Ortsgemeinden ("local municipalities"):

1. Hütschenhausen
2. Kottweiler-Schwanden
3. Niedermohr
4. Ramstein-Miesenbach
5. Steinwenden
