= Uncial 051 =

- New Testament manuscript
- Name: Codex Athous Pantokratoros
- Text: Revelation of John †
- Date: 10th century
- Script: Greek
- Now at: Pantokratoros monastery
- Size: 23 x 18 cm
- Type: mixed
- Category: III

Uncial 051 (in the Gregory-Aland numbering), is a Greek uncial manuscript of the Book of Revelation, dated paleographically to the 10th century.

== Description ==
The codex contains incomplete text of Rev 11:15-13:1.3-22:7.15-21, with a commentary of Andreas's (see Uncial 052), on 92 parchment leaves (23 cm by 18 cm). The text is written in one column per page, 22 lines per page (16.6 by 10.5 cm), in uncial letters. The uncial letters leaned to the right. A commentary is written in cursive letters. It has breathings and accents. The text is divided according to κεφαλαια (rarely numbered) and λογοι.

The Greek text of this codex Aland placed in Category III.

In Revelation 11:17 it has traditional reading και ο ερχομενος along with manuscripts 35, 1006, 1841, 2074, 2723, the Bohairic, Tyconius, and Vulgata Clementina (qui venturus es).

The manuscript was written in Italy. In 1899 Kirsopp Lake photographed 1 page of it. In 1902 it was thoroughly examined by C. R. Gregory, who partially collated its text. Herman C. Hoskier collated and edited its text in 1929.

The codex is located in the Pantokratoros monastery of Mount Athos (44).

== See also ==
- List of New Testament uncials
- Textual criticism
