= Papyrus 82 =

Papyrus 𝔓^{82}
- New Testament manuscript
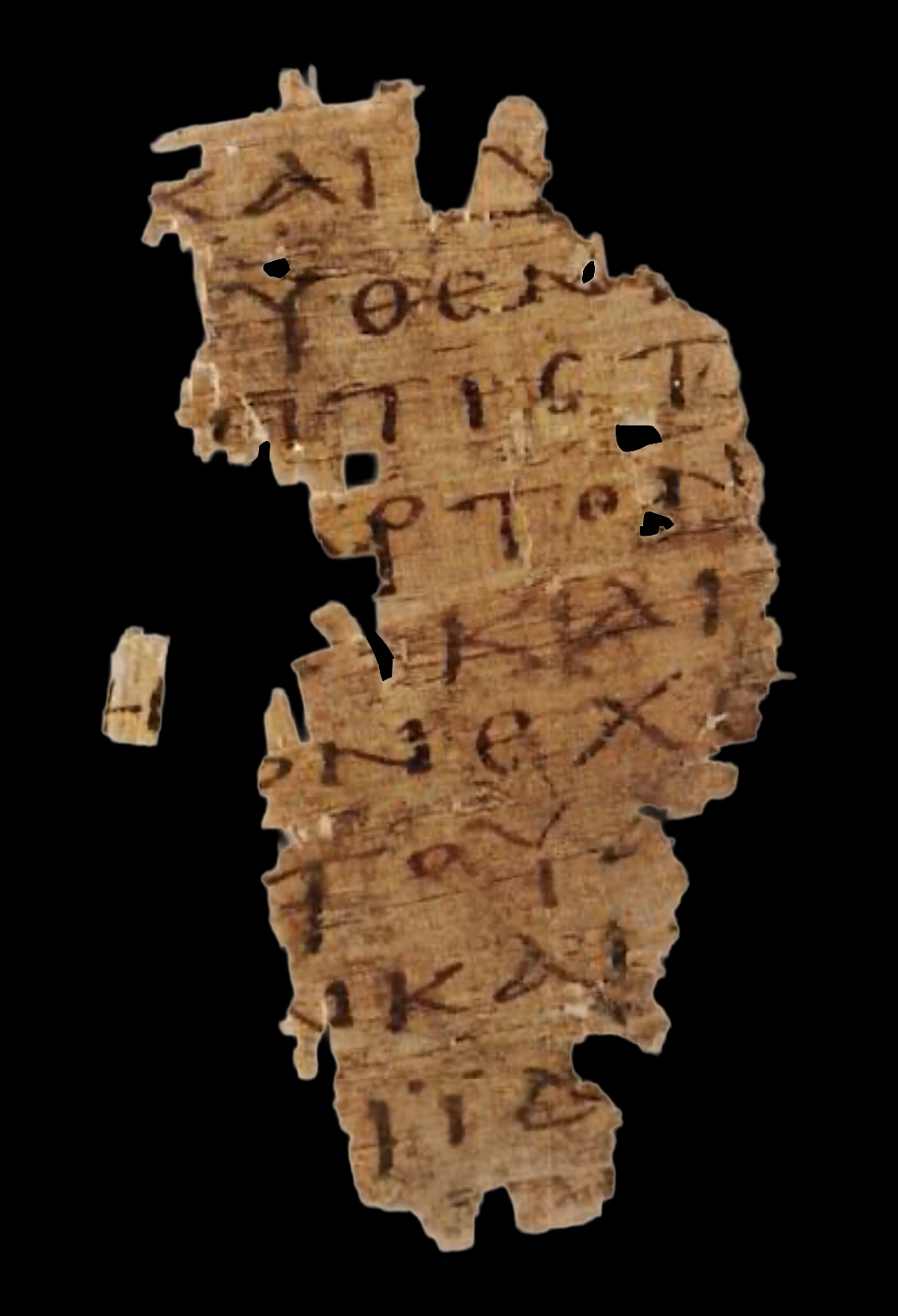
- Recto, Luke 7:32-34
- Text: Gospel of Luke 7 †
- Date: 4th / 5th century
- Script: Greek
- Found: Egypt
- Now at: Bibliothèque nationale et universitaire
- Cite: J. Schwartz, Fragment d’evangile sur papyrus, ZPE 3 (Bonn: 1967), pp. 157-158
- Size: 6.6 cm x 3.2 cm
- Type: Alexandrian text-type
- Category: II

Papyrus 82 (in the Gregory-Aland numbering), designated by 𝔓^{82}, is an early copy of the New Testament in Greek. It is a papyrus manuscript of the Gospel of Luke. The surviving texts of Luke are verses 7:32-34,37-38. The manuscript paleographically had been assigned to the 4th century (or 5th century).

Text

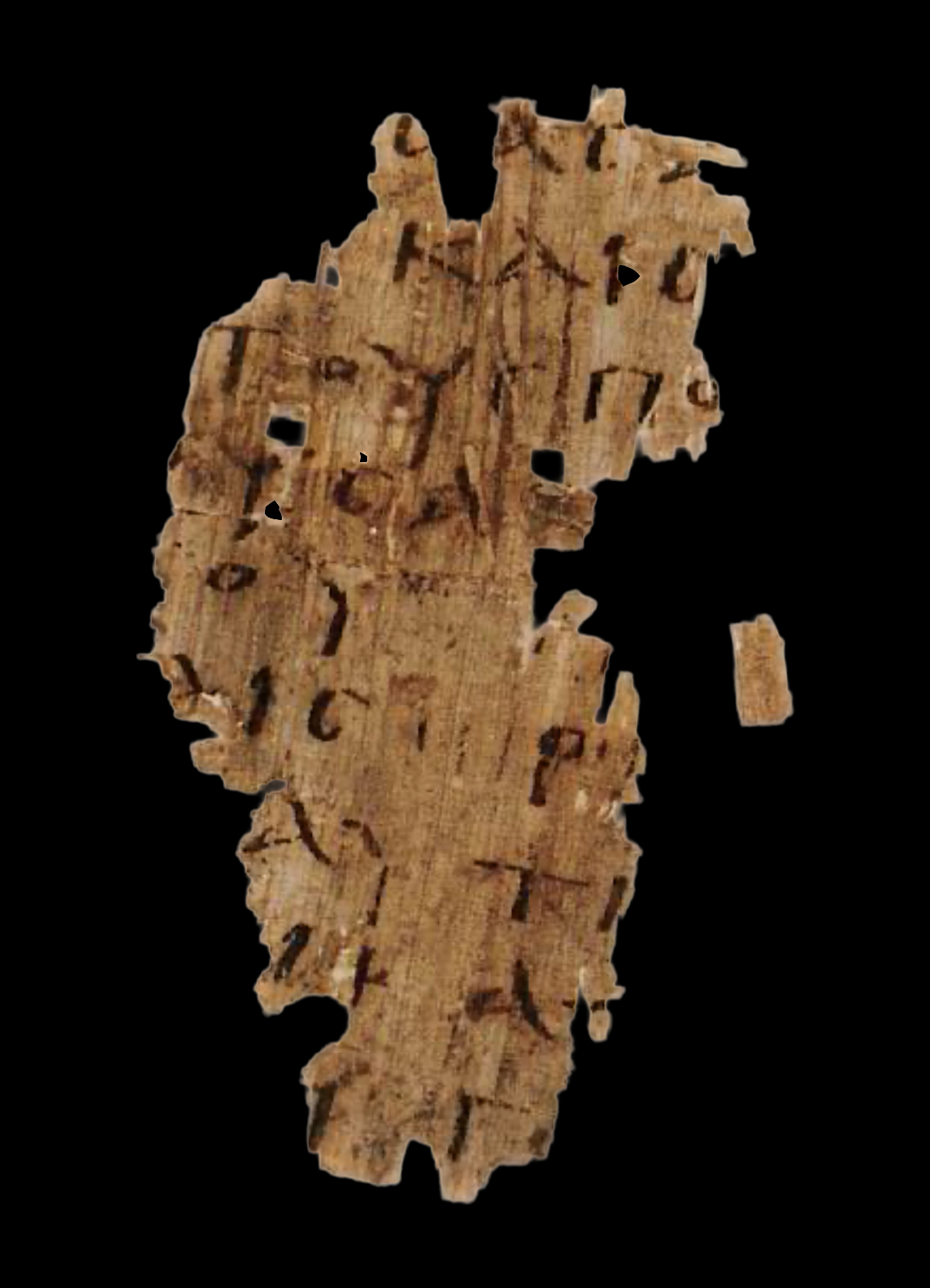
Verso, Luke 7:37-38

The Greek text of this codex probably is a representative of the Alexandrian text-type. Aland placed it in Category II.

Location

It is currently housed at the Bibliothèque nationale et universitaire (P. Gr. 2677) in Strasbourg.

== See also ==
- List of New Testament papyri
- Papyrus 85
