= Papyrus 43 =

Papyrus 𝔓^{43}
- New Testament manuscript
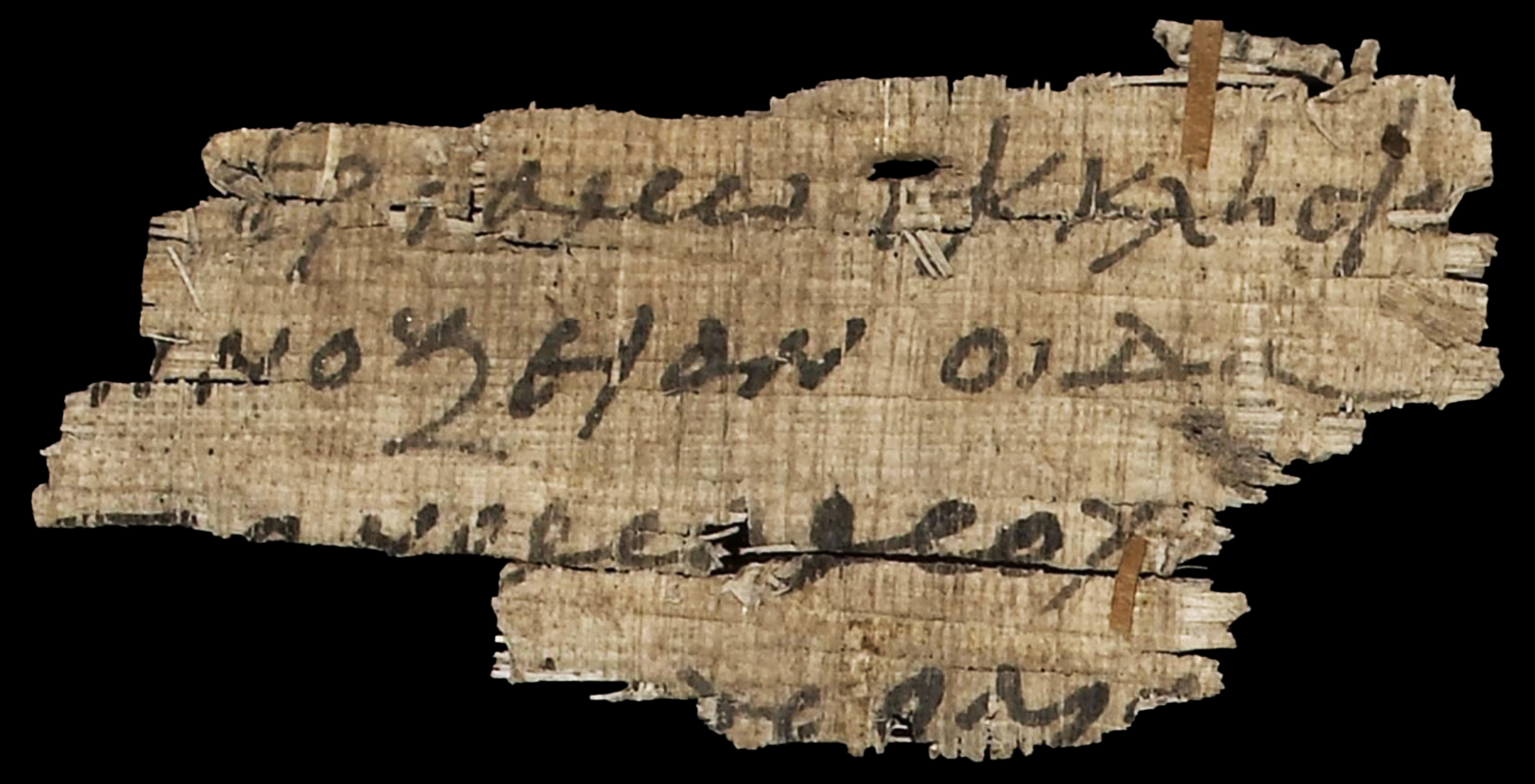
- Recto Revelation 2:12-13
- Text: Book of Revelation 2; 15-16 †
- Date: 6th/7th century
- Script: Greek
- Found: Egypt
- Now at: British Library
- Cite: W. E. Crum, H. I. Bell, Coptica III, (Copenhagen, 1922), pp. 43-45.
- Type: Alexandrian text-type
- Category: II

Papyrus 43, also known as British Museum Papyrus 2241, is an early copy of the New Testament in Greek. It is a papyrus manuscript containing text from the Book of Revelation, specifically Rev 2:12-13, and 15:8-16:2. It is designated by the siglum 𝔓^{43} in the Gregory-Aland numbering of New Testament manuscripts. Using the study of comparative writing styles (palaeography), the manuscript has been dated to the 6th or 7th century CE.

== Description ==
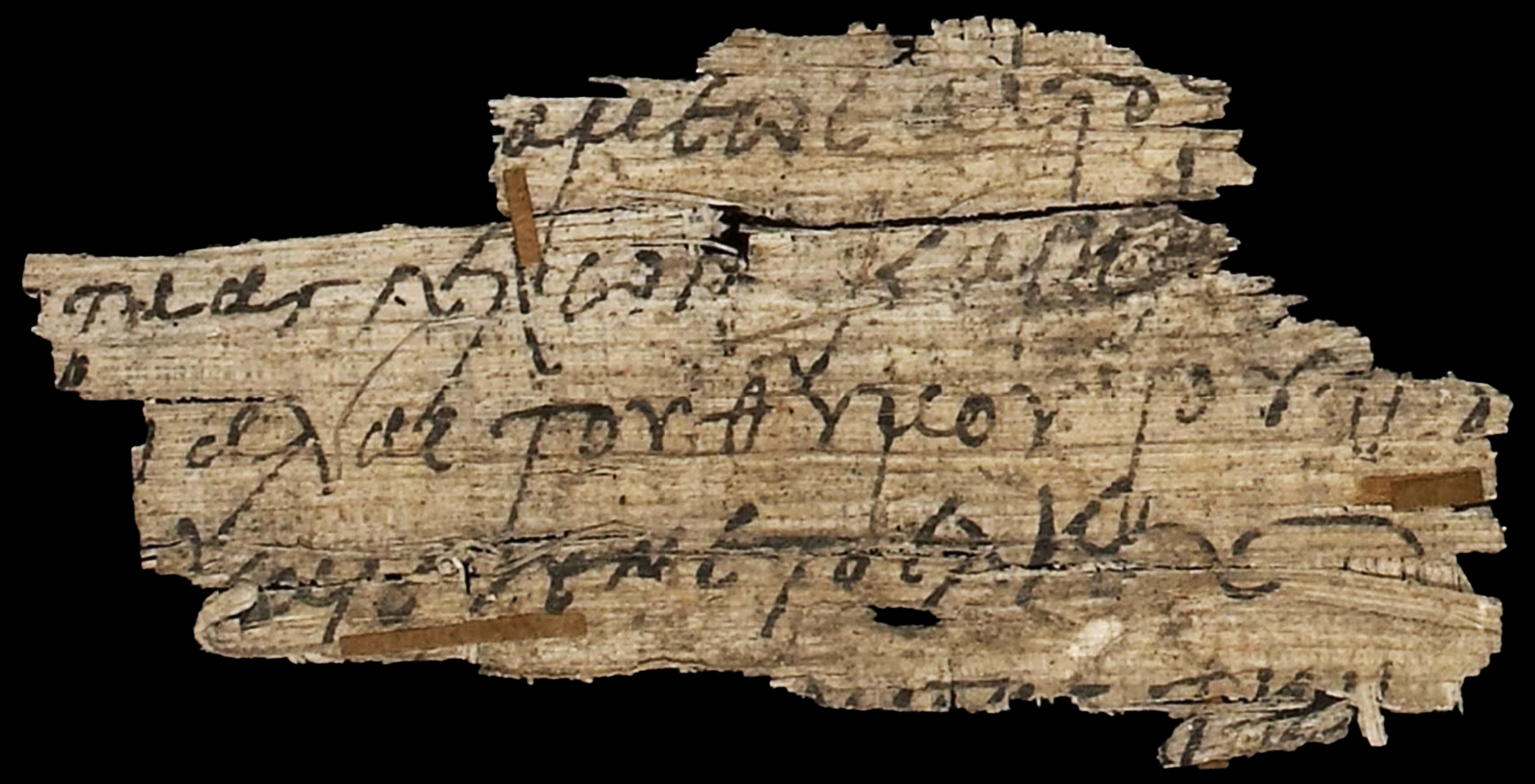
Verso Revelation 15:8-16:2

Scholars W. E. Crum, and H. I. Bell describe 𝔓^{43} as "a small scrap of light-coloured papyrus... [written] in two, rough, inelegant sloping hands." Though the lines on each side are long, it is probable that the papyrus only had extracts from Revelation on it, as it is unlikely to have text from chapters 2 and 15 if the text was continuous. The text on the reverse side (known as the verso) being the opposite way around to the text on the front side (known as the recto) supports this conclusion.

The Greek text of this codex is considered a representative of the Alexandrian text-type. Biblical scholar Kurt Aland placed it in Category II of his New Testament manuscripts classification system due to its assigned date.

It is currently housed at the British Library (Inv. 2241) in London.

== See also ==
- List of New Testament papyri
