= Uncial 0114 =

- New Testament manuscript
- Text: Gospel of John 20 †
- Date: 8th-century
- Script: Greek–Coptic diglot
- Now at: Bibliothèque nationale de France
- Size: 39 x 30 cm
- Type: Alexandrian text-type
- Category: II

Uncial 0114 (in the Gregory-Aland numbering), ε 53 (von Soden); is a Greek–Coptic diglot uncial manuscript of the New Testament, dated palaeographically to the 8th-century.

== Description ==
The codex contains a small part of the Gospel of John, 20:4-6,8-10, on one very large parchment leaf. The size of the page is rather unusual. It is about 39 cm by 30 cm. The text is written in two columns per page, 32 lines per page, in uncial letters. It was classified as an uncial codex, but, according to the opinion of modern scholars, it is a lectionary. It is classified on Aland's List of New Testament lectionaries as ℓ 965.

The Greek text of this codex is a representative of the Alexandrian text-type. Aland placed it in Category II. This means it has some alien readings.

Currently it is dated by the INTF to the 8th-century.

The codex now is located at the Bibliothèque nationale de France (Copt. 129,10, fol. 198), in Paris.

== See also ==
- List of New Testament uncials
- List of New Testament lectionaries
- Coptic versions of the Bible
- Textual criticism
- Uncial 0127
- Uncial 0128
