= P42 =

P-42 or P42 may refer to:

== Vessels ==
- ARA Rosales (P-42), a corvette of the Argentine Navy
- HMS Unbroken (P42), a submarine of the Royal Navy
- LÉ Ciara (P42), a patrol vessel of the Irish Naval Service
- Spanish patrol vessel Rayo (P-42)

== Other uses ==
- Curtiss XP-42, an American experimental fighter aircraft
- GE P42, a diesel locomotive
- Lake City Air Force Station, a closed United States Air Force radar station in Tennessee
- MAPK1, p42 mitogen-activated protein kinase
- Papyrus 42, a biblical manuscript
- Phosphorus-42, an isotope of phosphorus
- P42, a Latvian state regional road
- P-42, a specially redesigned record-setting Sukhoi Su-27 Soviet fighter aircraft
- P4_{2}, three-dimensional space group number 77
