= Bible translations into Coptic =

There have been many Coptic versions of the Bible, including some of the earliest translations into any language. Several different versions were made in the ancient world, with different editions of the Old and New Testament in five of the dialects of Coptic: Bohairic (northern), Fayyumic, Sahidic (southern), Akhmimic and Mesokemic (middle). Biblical books were translated from the Alexandrian Greek version.

The Sahidic was the leading dialect in the pre-Islamic period, after the 11th century Bohairic became dominant and the only used dialect of the Coptic language.

Partial copies of a number of Coptic Bibles survive. A considerable number of apocryphal texts also survive in Coptic, most notably the Gnostic Nag Hammadi library. Coptic remains the liturgical language of the Coptic Church and Coptic editions of the Bible are central to that faith.

== Old Testament ==
The inter-relationship between various significant ancient manuscripts of the Old Testament. LXX denotes the original Septuagint.

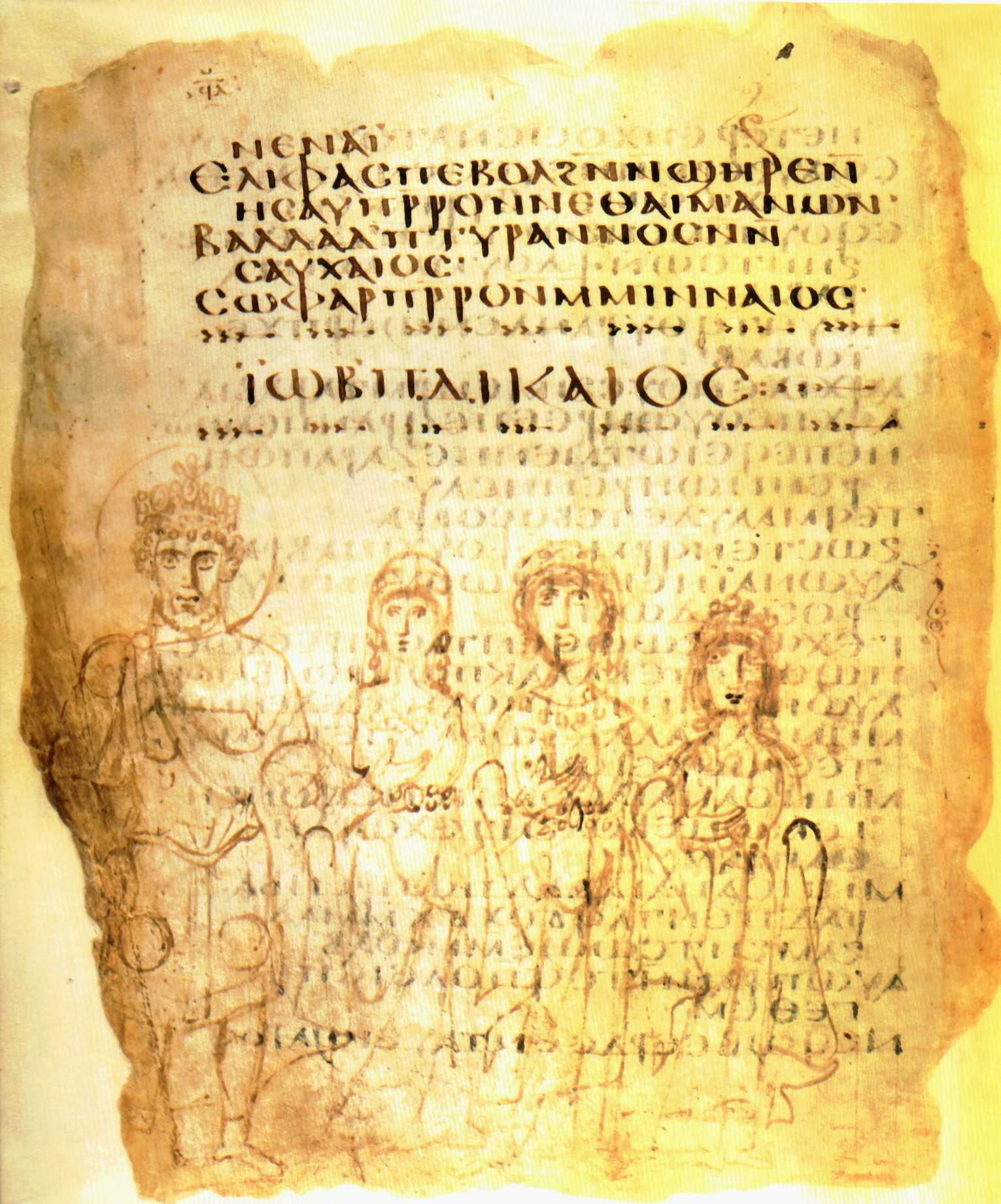
Job and his daughter from folio 4v of Biblioteca Vittorio Emanuele III, MS I B 18.

Translators of books of the Old Testament into Egyptian dialects were naturally made from the Alexandrian Greek version (Septuagint), and there is no reason to doubt that they were translated at as early a date as the Gospels and Epistles, if not indeed before them. Portions of the Old Testament exist in each Egyptian dialect.

In Sahidic, some Biblical books survived with complete text, as well as a large number of extant fragments representing most of the canonical books and certain of the deutero-canonical (the two Wisdoms, the Epistle of Jeremiah, and the Greek additions to Daniel).

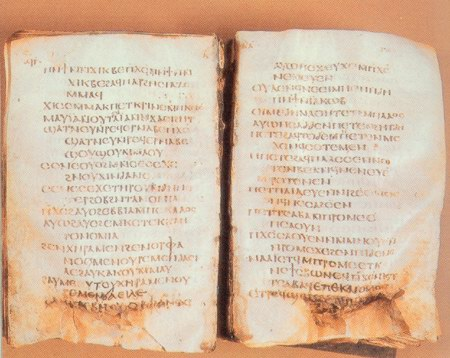
The Mudil Psalter, the oldest complete psalter in the Coptic language (Coptic Museum, Egypt, Coptic Cairo).

Some early manuscripts:

- Bodmer III – John 1:1–21:25, Genesis 1:1–4:2; 4th century; Bohairic
- Bodmer VI – Proverbs 1:1–21:4; 4th/5th century; Paleo-Theban ("Dialect P")
- Bodmer XVI – Exodus 1:1–15:21; 4th century;
- Bodmer XVIII – Deuteronomy 1:1–10:7; 4th century;
- Bodmer XXI – Joshua 6:16–25; 7:6–11:23; 22:1–2; 22:19–23:7; 23:15–24:2; 4th century;
- Bodmer XXII – Jeremiah 40:3–52:34; Lamentations; Epistle of Jeremiah; Book of Baruch; 4th/5th century;
- Bodmer XXIII – Isaiah 47:1–66:24; 4th century;
- Bodmer XL – Song of Songs
- Bodmer XLIV – Book of Daniel; Bohairic.
- Schøyen Ms 114 – Psalms; Sahidic; c. 400.

== New Testament ==
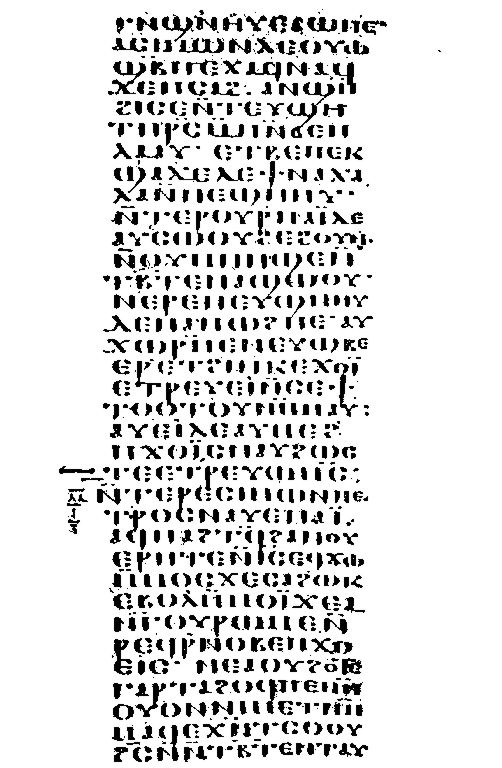
8th century Coptic manuscript of Luke 5:5–9

John 1:1–4

The two main dialects, Sahidic and Bohairic, are the most important for the study of early versions of the New Testament. The Sahidic was the leading dialect in the pre-Islamic period. The earliest Bohairic manuscripts date to the 4th century, but most texts come from the 9th century and later.

=== Sahidic ===
The collection of manuscripts of Sahidic translations is often designated by cop^{sa} in academic writing and critical apparatus ("Sa" for "versio Sahidica" in BHS). The first translation into the Sahidic dialect was made at the end of the 2nd century in Upper Egypt, where Greek was less well understood. So the Sahidic is famous for being the first major literary development of the Coptic language, though literary work in the other dialects soon followed. By the ninth century, Sahidic was gradually replaced by neighbouring Bohairic, and disappeared. Knowledge of the Sahidic manuscripts was lost until they were rediscovered in the 18th century. In 1778 Woide issued a prospectus in which he announced his intention of publishing from Oxford manuscripts the fragments of the New Testament "iuxta interpretationem dialecti Superioris Aegypti, quae Thebaidica seu Sahidica appellantur". Another fragments were published in 1884 by Émile Amélineau. Amélineau also edited other fragments in 1886–1888.

Several years later Horner produced a critical edition of the Sahidic New Testament over the period 1911–1924. Horner's edition containing almost every verse of the entire New Testament. The Sahidic translation is a representative of the Alexandrian text-type.

The order of books: Gospels (John, Matthew, Mark, Luke), Pauline epistles (Hebrews between 2 Corinthians and Galatians), Catholic epistles, Acts, Apocalypse.

Omitted verses:

- Matthew 12:47
- Matthew 16:2b–3; 17:21; 18:11; 23:14
- Mark 9:44.46; 11:26; 15:28
- Luke 17:36; 22:43–44
- John 5:4; 7:53–8:11
- Acts 8:37; 15:34; 24:7; 28:29
- Romans 16:24.

Omitted or not included phrases:

- Matthew 15:6 or (his) mother not included.
- Luke 11:4 phrase "but deliver us from evil" is omitted. This omission is supported by the Greek manuscripts: Codex Sinaiticus, Codex Vaticanus, Codex Regius, f^{1}, 700, and some early versions vg, syr^{s}, cop^{bo}, arm, geo.

==== Textual variants ====
In Luke 4:17 it has textual variant "and opened the book" together with the Greek manuscripts A, B, L, W, Ξ, 33, 892, 1195, 1241, ℓ 547, syr^{s, h, pal}, cop^{bo}, against variant "and unrolled the book" supported by א, D^{c}, K, Δ, Θ, Π, Ψ, f^{1}, f^{13}, 28, 565, 700, 1009, 1010 and many other manuscripts.

In Luke 16:19 the version reads: "There was a rich man, with the name N[in]eue, who clothed himself". This reading has also Greek manuscript Papyrus 75 and two Greek minuscule manuscripts 36 and 37, have a scholion of uncertain date ευρον δε τινες και του πλουσιου εν τισιν αντιγραφοις τουνομα Νινευης λεγομενον.

In John 10,7 it reads ο ποιμην (shepherd) for η θυρα (door). The reading is supported by 𝔓^{75} and cop^{ac}.

In Acts 27:37 it reads "seventy six" (as Codex Vaticanus) for "two hundred seventy six".

In 1 Corinthians 15:47 it reads δευτερος for δευτερος ανθρωπος (as cop^{bo}).

==== Some manuscripts ====
Some of the more notable manuscripts of the Sahidic are the following.

- The Crosby-Schøyen Codex is a papyrus manuscript of 52 leaves (12x12 cm). It contains the complete text of Book of Jonah and 1 Peter (2 Maccabees 5:27–8:41, Melito of Sardis, Peri Pascha 47–105, unidentified Homily). It is dated to the 3rd or 4th centuries and is held at the University of Mississippi.
- British Library MS. Oriental 7594 contains an unusual combination of books: Deuteronomy, Jonah, and Acts. It is dated paleographically to the late 3rd or early 4th century.
- Michigan MS. Inv 3992, a papyrus codex, has 42 folios (14 by 15 cm). It contains 1 Corinthians, Titus, and the Book of Psalms. It is dated to the 4th century.
- Berlin MS. Or. 408 and British Museum Or. 3518, being parts of the same original document. The Berlin portion contains the Book of Revelation, 1 John, and Philemon (in this order). It is dated to the 4th century.
- Bodmer XIX – Matthew 14:28–28:20; Romans 1:1–2:3; 4th or 5th century.
- Bodmer XLII – 2 Corinthians; dialect unknown; Wolf-Peter Funk suggest Sahidic;

=== Bohairic ===
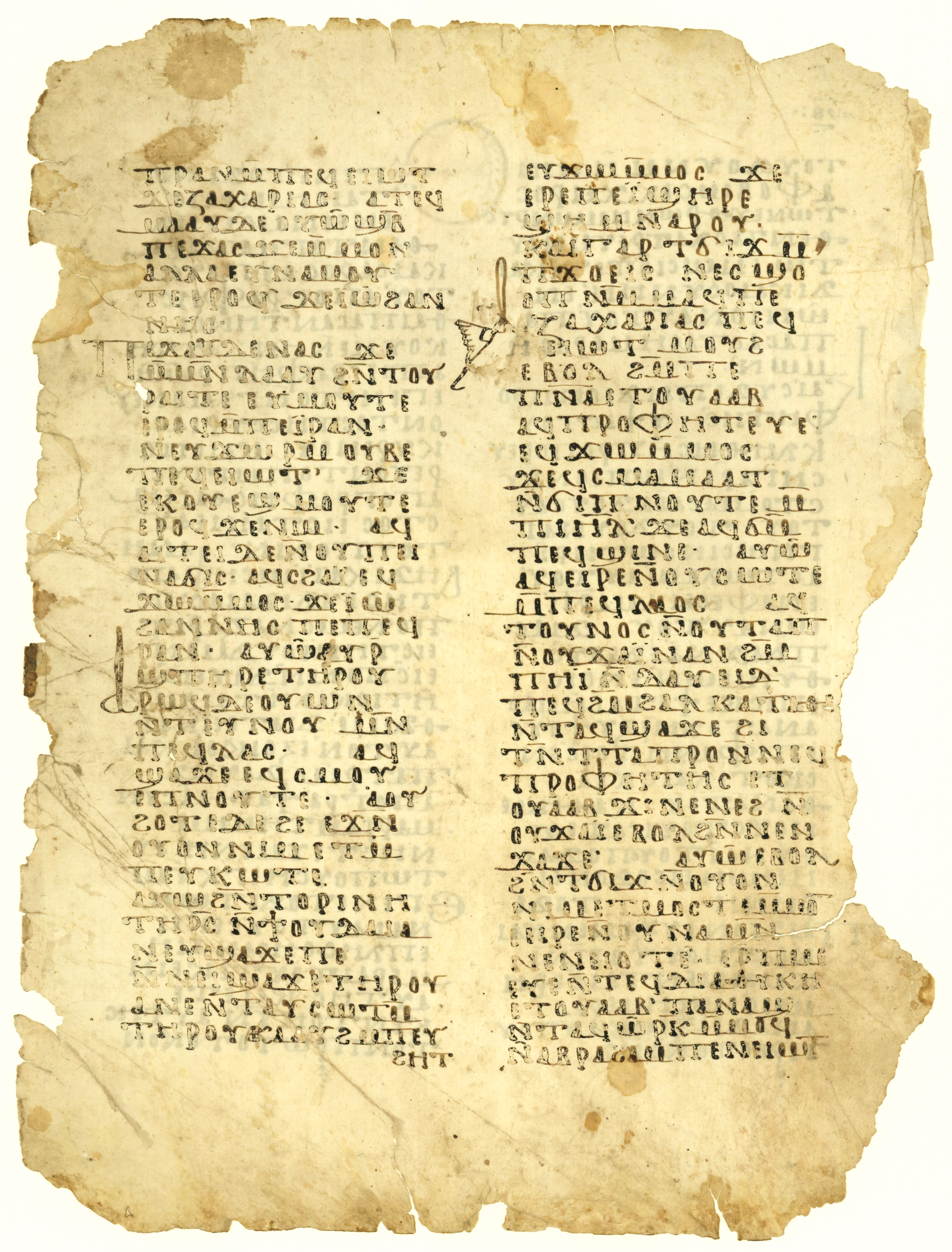
Uncial 0177 with the text of Luke 1:59–73

The Bohairic (dialect of Lower Egypt) translation was made a little later, as the Greek language was more influential in lower (northern) Egypt. Probably, it was made in the beginning of the 3rd century. It was a very literal translation; many Greek words, and even some grammatical forms (e.g. syntactic construction μεν – δε) were incorporated to this translation. For this reason, the Bohairic translation is more helpful in the reconstruction of the early Greek text than any other ancient translation.

The Bohairic translation was influenced by several variables, including the other dialects, primarily Sahidic and Fayyumic. When the patriarchate moved from Alexandria to Cairo in the 11th century, Bohairic was the dominant language of the Coptic church. As the official dialect of the Coptic Orthodox Church, Bohairic seems to enjoy a strong relationship with mainly the other dialects, Egyptian Arabic and—as it was for several centuries—Greek. The text is mainly Alexandrian, somewhat influenced by the Western text-type. The Bohairic translation is designated by cop^{bo}.

The order of books: Gospels (John, Matthew, Mark, Luke), Pauline epistles (Hebrews between 2 Thess and 1 Tim), Catholic epistles, Acts, and Apocalypse. The Apocalypse is preserved in relatively few manuscripts.

Omitted verses: Matthew 17:21 (some mss); 18:11 (mss); 23:14 (mss); Mark 9:44.46; 11:26 (mss); 15:28 (mss); Luke 17:36; 22:43–44; John 5:4 (mss); 7:53–8:11 (mss); Acts 8:37; 15:34 (mss); 24:7; 28:29; Romans 16:24.

It contains Matthew 12:47; Some manuscripts of the Bohairic version contains verses: 17: 21; 18:11; 23:14; Mark 11:26; 15:28; John 5:4; 7:53–8:11; Acts 15:34;

In Acts 27:37 it reads "one hundred seventy six" for "two hundred seventy six".

==== Some manuscripts ====
The original {Old} Bohairic version is well represented by manuscripts. More than a hundred of manuscripts have survived. All have the last twelve verses of Mark.

- The earliest surviving manuscript of the four Gospels is dated AD 889. It is not complete.
- Papyrus Bodmer III is the oldest manuscript of the Bohairic version. It was discovered by John M. Bodmer of Geneva in Upper Egypt. It contains the Gospel of John, dated palaeographically to the 4th century. It contains 239 pages, but the first 22 are damaged.
- Huntington MS 17, bilingual Bohairic-Arabic, dated to 1174, the oldest manuscript with complete text of the four Gospels in Bohairic.
- Huntington MS 20, bilingual Bohairic-Greek, with complete text of the four Gospels.
- Oriental MS 424, bilingual Bohairic-Arabic, dated to 1308, with complete text of the Pauline epistles, Catholic epistles, and the Acts.
- Codex Marshall Or. 5.

The Bohairic version was employed by Mill for his edition of 1707. It was first published in 1716 by Wilkins, who edited "Novum Testamentum Aegyptium vulgo Copticum". His edition was accompanied with a Latin translation. Horner produced a critical edition of the Bohairic New Testament in 1898–1905. Horner used more than fifty Bohairic manuscripts preserved in that time in the libraries of Europe.

=== Middle Egypt ===
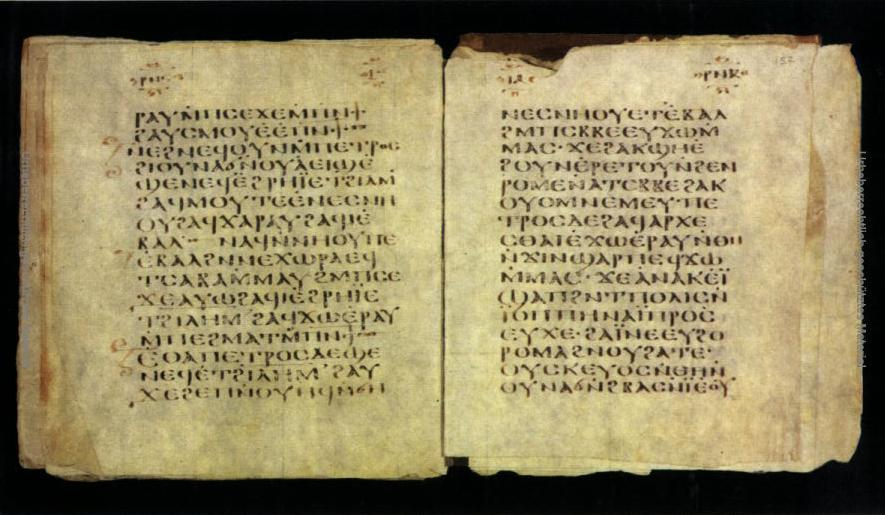
Codex Glazier, manuscript of Acts

The only surviving witnesses of an Akhmimic, and an Fayyumic Versions are in a fragmentary pieces (designated by cop^{akh}, and cop^{fay}).

- The Schøyen Codex, a papyrus manuscript. It contains Gospel of Matthew. Dated to the early 4th century. It is the earliest Matthew in any Coptic dialect.
- Codex Glazier, contains Acts 1:1–15:3, housed at the Pierpont Morgan Library.
- P. Mich. inv. 3521, Gospel of John in Fayyumic, ca. AD 325.

=== Textual features ===
Mark 8:15

- the Herodians – 𝔓^{45}, W, Θ, f^{1}, f^{13}, 28, 565, 1365, it^{i}, it^{k}, cop^{sa}, arm, geo
- Herod – cop^{bo} majority of Greek mss

In 1 John 5:6 two versions, Sahidic and Bohairic, have textual variant "through water and blood and spirit" supported by the manuscripts: Codex Sinaiticus, Codex Alexandrinus, 104, 424^{c}, 614, 1739^{c}, 2412, 2495, ℓ 598^{m}, syr^{h}, Origen. (Note: For another variants of this verse see: Textual variants in the First Epistle of John.) Bart D. Ehrman identified this reading as Orthodox corrupt reading.

=== Greek-Coptic diglot manuscripts ===
More than forty Greek-Coptic diglot manuscripts of the New Testament have survived to the present day.

- Papyrus 2
- Papyrus 6
- Papyrus 41
- Papyrus 42
- Papyrus 62
- Papyrus 96
- Codex Borgianus
- Uncial 070
- Uncial 086
- Uncial 0100
- Uncial 0114
- Uncial 0129 (= 0203, ℓ 1575)
- Uncial 0164
- Uncial 0177
- Uncial 0184
- Uncial 0200
- Uncial 0204
- Uncial 0205
- Uncial 0236
- Uncial 0237
- Uncial 0238
- Uncial 0239
- Uncial 0260
- Uncial 0275
- Uncial 0276
- Uncial 0298
- Uncial 0299
- Lectionary 143
- Lectionary 961
- Lectionary 962
- Lectionary 963
- Lectionary 964
- Lectionary 965
- Lectionary 1353
- Lectionary 1355
- Lectionary 1575
- Lectionary 1602
- Lectionary 1603
- Lectionary 1604
- Lectionary 1606
- Lectionary 1607
- Lectionary 1614
- Lectionary 1678
- Lectionary 1739
- Lectionary 1994
- Lectionary 2210

Lectionaries 1993 and 1605 are trilingual manuscripts:

- Lectionary 1993 – Coptic, Greek, and Arabic
- Lectionary 1605 – Greek, Coptic, and Arabico

== See also ==
- Coptic (disambiguation)
- Coptic language
- Coptic literature
- Coptic Orthodox Church
- Crosby-Schøyen Codex MS 193

=== Coptic manuscripts ===
- List of the Coptic New Testament manuscripts
- Old Testament fragment (Naples, Biblioteca Vittorio Emanuele III, I B 18)

=== Other versions ===
- Syriac versions of the Bible
- Slavic translations of the Bible
