= P96 =

P96 may refer to:

- HMS Volatile (P96), a submarine of the Royal Navy
- Jersey Shore Airport, in Nippenose Township, Pennsylvania, United States
- P-96 pistol
- Papyrus 96, a biblical manuscript
- Picasso 96, a graphics adapter API for the Amiga computer
- Tecnam P96 Golf, an Italian light aircraft
- P96, a state regional road in Latvia
