= Lectionary 1575 =

Uncial 0129
- New Testament manuscript
- Text: Pauline epistles †
- Date: 9th-century
- Script: Greek-Coptic diglot
- Now at: Bibliothèque nationale de France
- Size: 35 x 25.5 cm
- Type: Alexandrian text-type
- Category: —

Lectionary 1575 (in the Gregory-Aland numbering), α 1037 (Soden), is a Greek-Coptic diglot lectionary manuscript of the New Testament, dated paleographically to the 9th-10th century.

== Description ==
The Greek text of this codex is a representative of the Alexandrian text-type. Kurt Aland did not place it in any Category.

Parts of this manuscript were formerly numbered as uncials 0129 and 0203. When was discovered that they belonged to the same manuscript as ℓ 1575, it was shown they were parts of the same lectionary.

The part formerly known as uncial 0129 is in the National Library of France (Copt. 129,11) in Paris; that formerly known as uncial 0203 is located at the British Library in London; the remainder of ℓ 1575 is located at the Österreichische Nationalbibliothek (Pap. K. 16.17) in Vienna.

According to the Alands, uncial 0129 contains a small part of the Pauline epistles, on two parchment leaves (35 cm by 25.5 cm). The text is written in two columns per page, 33 lines per page, in uncial letters.

It is dated by the INTF to the 9th-century.

== See also ==
- List of New Testament lectionaries
- List of New Testament uncials
- Coptic versions of the Bible
- Textual criticism
