= Uncial 0239 =

- New Testament manuscript
- Text: Luke 2:27-30,34
- Date: 7th-century
- Script: Greek-Coptic diglot
- Now at: British Library
- Size: 26 x 21 cm
- Type: mixed
- Category: III

Uncial 0239 (in the Gregory-Aland numbering), is a Greek-Coptic uncial manuscript of the New Testament. Paleographically it has been assigned to the 7th-century.

== Description ==
The codex contains a small part of the Gospel of Luke 2:27-30,34, on one parchment leaf (26 cm by 21 cm). The text is written in two columns per page, 25 lines per page, in uncial letters.

Currently it is dated by the INTF to the 7th-century.

It was written and found in Egypt in Fayyum.

The manuscript was added to the list of the New Testament manuscripts by Kurt Aland in 1954.

The Coptic text was published by Walter Ewing Crum in 1905. The Greek text was published by H. L. Heller.

== Location ==
Currently the codex is housed at the British Library in London, with the shelf number Oriental 4717 (16).

== Text ==
The Greek text of this codex is mixed. Aland placed it in Category III.

== See also ==
- List of New Testament uncials
- Coptic versions of the Bible
- Textual criticism
