= Lectionary 1614 =

Lectionary ℓ 1614
- New Testament manuscript
- Text: Evangelistarion
- Date: 7th/8th century
- Script: Coptic / Greek diglot
- Now at: University of Michigan
- Size: 32.5 by 28 cm

Lectionary 1614, designated by ℓ 1614 in the Gregory-Aland numbering. It is a Coptic/Greek bilingual manuscript of the New Testament, on parchment leaves, dated paleographically to the 7th or 8th century.

== Description ==
The codex contains some Lessons from the four Gospels lectionary (Evangelistarium) (Luke 1:39–56 [Greek] Luke 1:39–56 [Coptic]; Mark 4:23—5:16; Matt 25:3–13 [Coptic]; Luke 1:39–48 [Coptic]). It additionally contains some non-biblical text in Greek and Coptic. It is written in Greek Uncial letters, on 4 leaves (32.5 by 28 cm), 2 columns per page, 33 lines per page.

The codex is now located in the University of Michigan (MS. 124) in Ann Arbor.

== See also ==
- List of New Testament lectionaries
- Coptic versions of the Bible
- Textual criticism
