= Uncial 0299 =

- New Testament manuscript
- Text: John 20:1-7; 21:23-25
- Date: 10th/11th century
- Script: Greek-Coptic diglot
- Now at: Bibliothèque nationale de France
- Size: 30.2 cm by 23.4 cm

Uncial 0299 (in the Gregory-Aland numbering), is a Greek-Coptic diglot uncial manuscript of the New Testament. Palaeographically it has been assigned to the 10th or 11th century.

== Description ==
The codex contains the text of the John 20:1-7 in Greek and the text of the John 21:23-25 in Coptic, on 1 parchment leaf (30.2 cm by 23.4 cm). The text is written in two columns per page, 36-41 lines per page, in uncial letters. It contains a commentary.

The Greek text of this codex is a representative of the mixed text-type. Aland placed it in Category III.

Currently it is dated by the INTF to the 10th or 11th century.

It is currently housed at the Bibliothèque nationale de France (Copt. 129,10, fol. 199) in Paris.

== See also ==
- List of New Testament uncials
- Coptic versions of the Bible
- Biblical manuscripts
- Textual criticism
