= Uncial 0199 =

- New Testament manuscript
- Text: 1 Corinthians 11:17–19, 22–24
- Date: 6th / 7th century
- Script: Greek
- Now at: British Library
- Size: 8.5 x 5 cm
- Type: mixed
- Category: III

Uncial 0199 (in the Gregory-Aland numbering), is a Greek uncial manuscript of the New Testament, dated paleographically to the 6th century (or 7th).

== Description ==
The codex contains a small parts of the First Epistle to the Corinthians 11:17–19, 22–24, on one parchment leaf (8.5 cm by 5 cm). The text is written in one column per page, 13 lines per page, in very large uncial letters.

The Greek text of this codex is a mixture of text-types. Aland placed it in Category III.

It was written in Egypt.

Currently it is dated by the INTF to the 6th or 7th century.

The codex currently is housed at the British Library (Pap. 2077 B) in London.

== See also ==
- List of New Testament uncials
- Textual criticism
- Uncial 0200
