= Uncial 0260 =

- New Testament manuscript
- Text: John 1:30-32
- Date: 6th century
- Script: Greek-Coptic diglot
- Now at: Berlin State Museums
- Size: 21 cm by 17 cm
- Type: mixed
- Category: III

Uncial 0260 (in the Gregory-Aland numbering), is a Greek-Coptic uncial manuscript of the New Testament. Palaeographically it has been assigned to the 6th century. The manuscript has survived in a very fragmentary condition.

== Description ==
The codex contains some parts of the Gospel of John 1:30-32, on 2 parchment leaves (21 cm by 17 cm). The text is written in two columns per page, 16 lines per page, in uncial letters. Coptic text is in Fayyumic dialect.

Currently it is dated by the INTF to the 6th century.

== Location ==
Currently the codex is housed at the Berlin State Museums (P. 5542) in Berlin.

== Text ==
The text-type of this codex is mixed. Aland placed it in Category III. The manuscript was examined by Kurt Treu and Horseley. Iw was used in 26. edition of Novum Testamentum Graece of Nestle-Aland.

== See also ==
- List of New Testament uncials
- Coptic versions of the Bible
- Textual criticism
