= Lectionary 143 =

Lectionary ℓ 143
- New Testament manuscript
- Text: Evangelistarion
- Date: 8th-century
- Script: Greek
- Now at: Berlin State Museums, French National Library, Vatican Library
- Size: 32 by 26 cm

Lectionary 143, designated by siglum ℓ 143 (in the Gregory-Aland numbering) is a Greek manuscript of the New Testament, on parchment leaves. Palaeographically it has been assigned to the 8th-century.

== Description ==
The codex contains Lessons Gospels lectionary for the Sunday and feasts with numerous lacunae. It contains texts of Matthew 2:1-11; Luke 12:8-12; and John 20:30f.

The text is written in Greek uncial letters, on 4 parchment leaves (32 by 26 cm), in one column per page, 15 lines per page.

It was described by J. Leopoldt in 1903 along with Uncial 0164.

Currently the codex is located in:

- Berlin State Museums, P. 8771 (Frg);
- National Library of France, Copt. 129,19 fol. 73;
- Vatican Library, Borg. copt. 109 (Cass. 23, Fasc. 97), 2 fol.

The manuscript is not cited in the critical editions of the Greek New Testament (UBS3, UBS4).

== See also ==
- List of New Testament lectionaries
- Coptic versions of the Bible
- Biblical manuscript
- Textual criticism

== Bibliography ==
- J. Leipoldt, Aegyptische Urkunden aus der königlichen Museen zu Berlin 1 (Berlin, 1904), pp. 147–148.
