= Uncial 0177 =

- New Testament manuscript
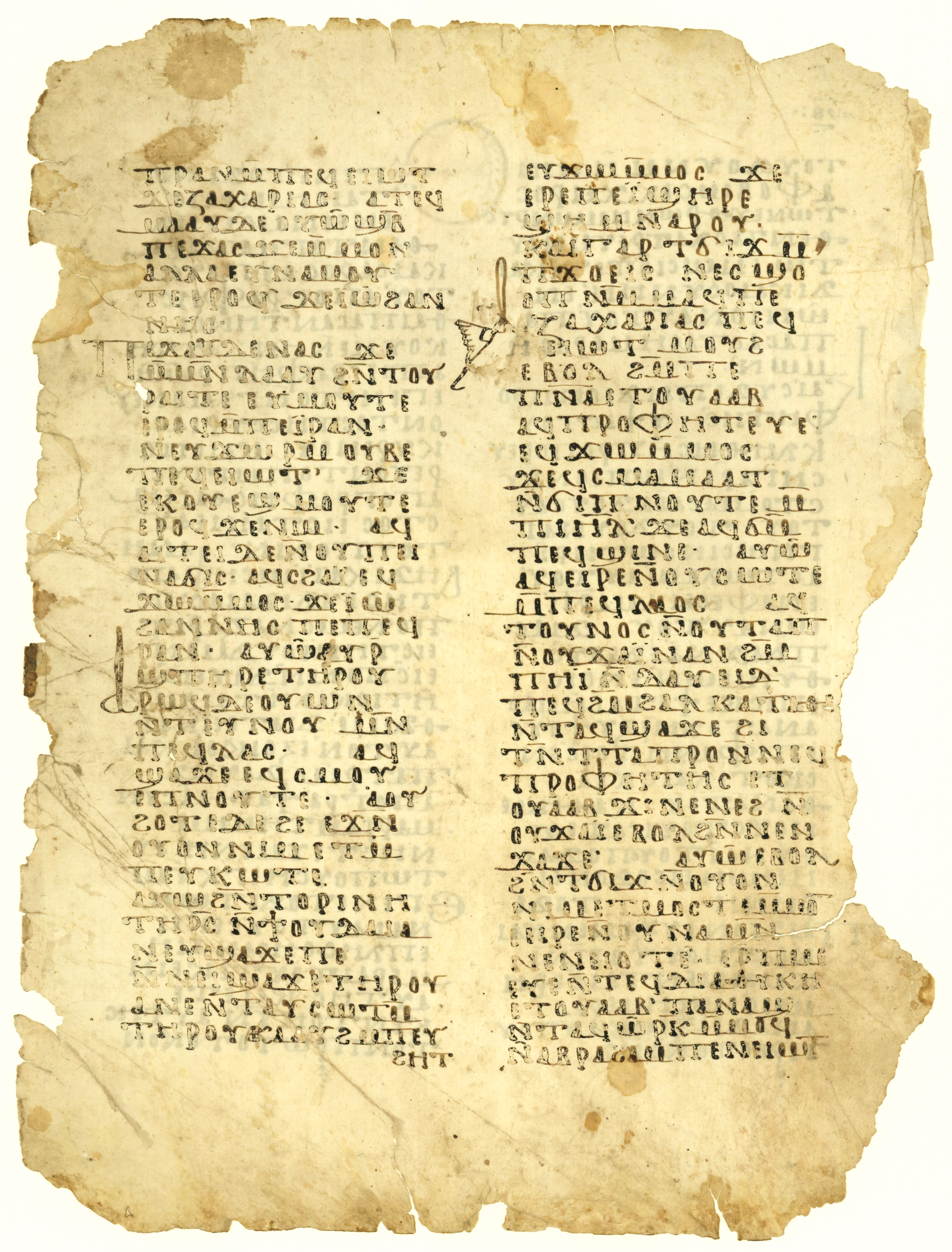
- Side recto with Luke 1:59-73
- Text: Luke 1:59-2:7
- Date: 10th-century
- Script: Greek-Coptic
- Now at: Papyrus Collection of the Austrian National Library
- Size: 36 x 27.5 cm
- Type: Western text-type
- Category: II

Uncial 0177 (in the Gregory-Aland numbering), is a Greek-Coptic uncial manuscript of the New Testament, dated paleographically to the 10th-century.

== Description ==
The codex contains a small part of the Gospel of Luke 1:73-2:7 (Greek) and Luke 1:59-73 (Coptic), on one parchment leaf (36 cm by 27.5 cm). It is written in two columns per page, 36 lines per page, in uncial letters. The parchment is ivory coloured.

The nomina sacra are written in an abbreviated way.

The Greek text of this codex is a representative of the Western text-type. It contains many scribal peculiarities. Aland placed it in Category II.

Currently it is dated by the INTF to the 10th-century.

The codex currently is housed at the Papyrus Collection of the Austrian National Library (Pap. K. 2698) in Vienna.

== See also ==
- List of New Testament uncials
- Coptic versions of the Bible
- Textual criticism
