= Uncial 0236 =

- New Testament manuscript
- Text: Apostles 3:12-13,15-16
- Date: 5th century
- Script: Greek-Coptic diglot
- Now at: Pushkin Museum
- Size: 22 x 18 cm
- Type: mixed
- Category: III

Uncial 0236 (in the Gregory-Aland numbering), is a Greek-Coptic uncial manuscript of the New Testament. Paleographically it has been assigned to the 5th century.

== Description ==
The codex contains two small parts of the Acts of the Apostles 3:12-13,15-16, on one parchment leaf (22 cm by 18 cm). The text is written in two columns per page, 26 lines per page, in uncial letters.

== Text ==
The Greek text of this codex is mixed. Aland placed it in Category III.

== History ==
Currently it is dated by the INTF to the 5th century.

It was examined by Pasquale Orsini.

The manuscript was added to the list of the New Testament manuscripts by Kurt Aland in 1954.

Currently the codex is housed at the Pushkin Museum (Golenishev Copt. 55) in Moscow.

== See also ==
- List of New Testament uncials
- Coptic versions of the Bible
- Textual criticism
