= Uncial 0200 =

- New Testament manuscript
- Text: Matthew 11:20-21
- Date: 7th century
- Script: Greek-Coptic
- Now at: British Library
- Size: 16.5 cm by 7 cm
- Type: mixed
- Category: III

Uncial 0200 (in the Gregory-Aland numbering), is a Greek-Coptic diglot uncial manuscript of the New Testament, on parchment. Palaeographically it has been assigned to the 7th century. The manuscript has survived in a very fragmentary condition.

== Description ==
The codex contains a small parts of the Gospel of Matthew 11:20-21, on one parchment leaf (16.5 cm by 7 cm). The text is written in two columns per page, 17 lines per page, in very large uncial letters.

The Greek text of this codex is mixed. Aland placed it in Category III.

Currently it is dated by the INTF to the 7th century.

It was examined and described by H. J. M. Milne.

The codex currently is housed at the British Library (Pap. 2077 C) in London.

== See also ==
- List of New Testament uncials
- Coptic versions of the Bible
- Textual criticism
- Uncial 0199
