= Lectionary 962 =

Uncial ℓ 962
- New Testament manuscript
- Text: Mark 14-15†
- Date: 8th century
- Script: Greek-Coptic diglot
- Now at: Louvre
- Size: 16 x 13.5 cm
- Type: ?
- Category: ?

Lectionary 962 (ℓ 962 in the Gregory-Aland numbering), is a Greek-Coptic uncial manuscript of the New Testament. Paleographically it has been assigned to the 8th century.

== Description ==
The codex contains a small parts of the Gospel of Mark 14:65-67,68-71; 14:72-15:2,4-7, on 1 parchment leaf (16 cm by 13.5 cm). It is written in two columns per page, 20 lines per page, in uncial letters.

Currently it is dated by the INTF to the 8th century. It was added to the list of the New Testament manuscripts by Kurt Aland, who gave him siglum 0276. Since second edition of Kurzgefasste it is catalogued as lectionary (ℓ 962).

== Location ==
Currently the codex is housed at the Louvre (10039b) in Paris.

== See also ==
- List of New Testament uncials
- Coptic versions of the Bible
- Biblical manuscripts
- Textual criticism
