= Uncial 0275 =

- New Testament manuscript
- Text: Mathew 5 †
- Date: 7th century
- Script: Greek-Coptic diglot
- Now at: Trinity College, Dublin
- Size: 28 x 25 cm
- Type: Alexandrian text-type
- Category: II

Uncial 0275 (in the Gregory-Aland numbering), is a Greek-Coptic uncial manuscript of the New Testament. Paleographically it has been assigned to the 7th century.

== Description ==
The codex contains a small part of the Gospel of Matthew 5:25-26,29-30, on 1 parchment leaf (28 cm by 25 cm). Written in two columns per page, 12 lines per page, in uncial letters.

Currently it is dated by the INTF to the 7th century.

== Text ==
The Greek text of this codex probably is a representative of the Alexandrian text-type. Aland placed it with hesitation in Category II. It was collated by A. Passoni in 1980.

== Location ==
After its discovery it was held in Cairo. Currently the codex is housed at Trinity College Dublin (TCD PAP F 138).

== See also ==
- List of New Testament uncials
- Coptic versions of the Bible
- Textual criticism
