= Uncial 0100 =

- New Testament manuscript
- Text: Gospel of John 20 †
- Date: 7th century
- Script: Greek–Coptic diglot
- Now at: Bibliothèque nationale de France
- Size: 37 cm by 38 cm
- Category: none

Uncial 0100 (in the Gregory-Aland numbering), ε 070 (Soden), is a Greek-Coptic diglot uncial manuscript of the New Testament. It is dated palaeographically to the 7th-century.

== Description ==
The codex contains a small part of the Gospel of John 20:26-27.30-31, on one parchment leaf (37 cm by 38 cm). The text is written in two columns per page, 33 lines per page, in large uncial letters.

Currently it is dated by the INTF to the 7th-century.

From the same manuscript originated another leaf now catalogued as Uncial 0195. It represents a part of lectionary 963 (ℓ 963), and should be classified among the lectionaries than the uncials.

The codex currently is located at the Bibliothèque nationale de France (Copt. 129,10), at Paris.

== Text ==
The Greek text of this codex Kurt Aland did not place in any Category.

In John 20:31 it reads ζωην αιωνιον along with manuscripts א, C(*), D, L, Ψ, f^{13} it vg^{mss} syr^{p, h} cop^{sa}, cop^{bo}; majority reads ζωην;

== See also ==
- List of New Testament uncials
- Coptic versions of the Bible
- Textual criticism
