= Uncial 0164 =

- New Testament manuscript
- Text: Matthew 13:20-21
- Date: 6th / 7th century
- Script: Greek-Coptic
- Now at: Berlin State Museums
- Size: 8 x 13 cm
- Type: mixed
- Category: III

Uncial 0164 (in the Gregory-Aland numbering), ε 022 (Soden), is a Greek-Coptic bilingual uncial manuscript of the New Testament, dated paleographically to the 6th century (or the 7th century).

The codex currently is housed at the Berlin State Museums (P. 9108) in Berlin.

== Description ==
The codex contains a small part of the Gospel of Matthew 13:20-21, on one small parchment leaf (8 cm by 13 cm). It is written in one column per page, 8 lines per page, in uncial letters. The leaf survived in a fragmentary condition.

Currently it is dated by the INTF to the 6th or 7th century.

It was described by J. Leopoldt in 1903 along with lectionary 143.

== Greek text ==
[τα πετρωδη σπα]
ρει [ουτος εστιν]
ο τον λ[ο]γον ακ[ου]
ων και ευθυς
[με]τα χαρας λαμ
[βαν]ων ουκ εχει
[δε ρι]ζαν εν εαυ
[τω αλλα] προς

The Greek text of this codex lacks word αυτον in 13:20. The text is to brief for classifying. Aland placed it in Category III (with hesitation).

== See also ==
- List of New Testament uncials
- Coptic versions of the Bible
- Textual criticism
- Biblical manuscript
