= Uncial 0238 =

- New Testament manuscript
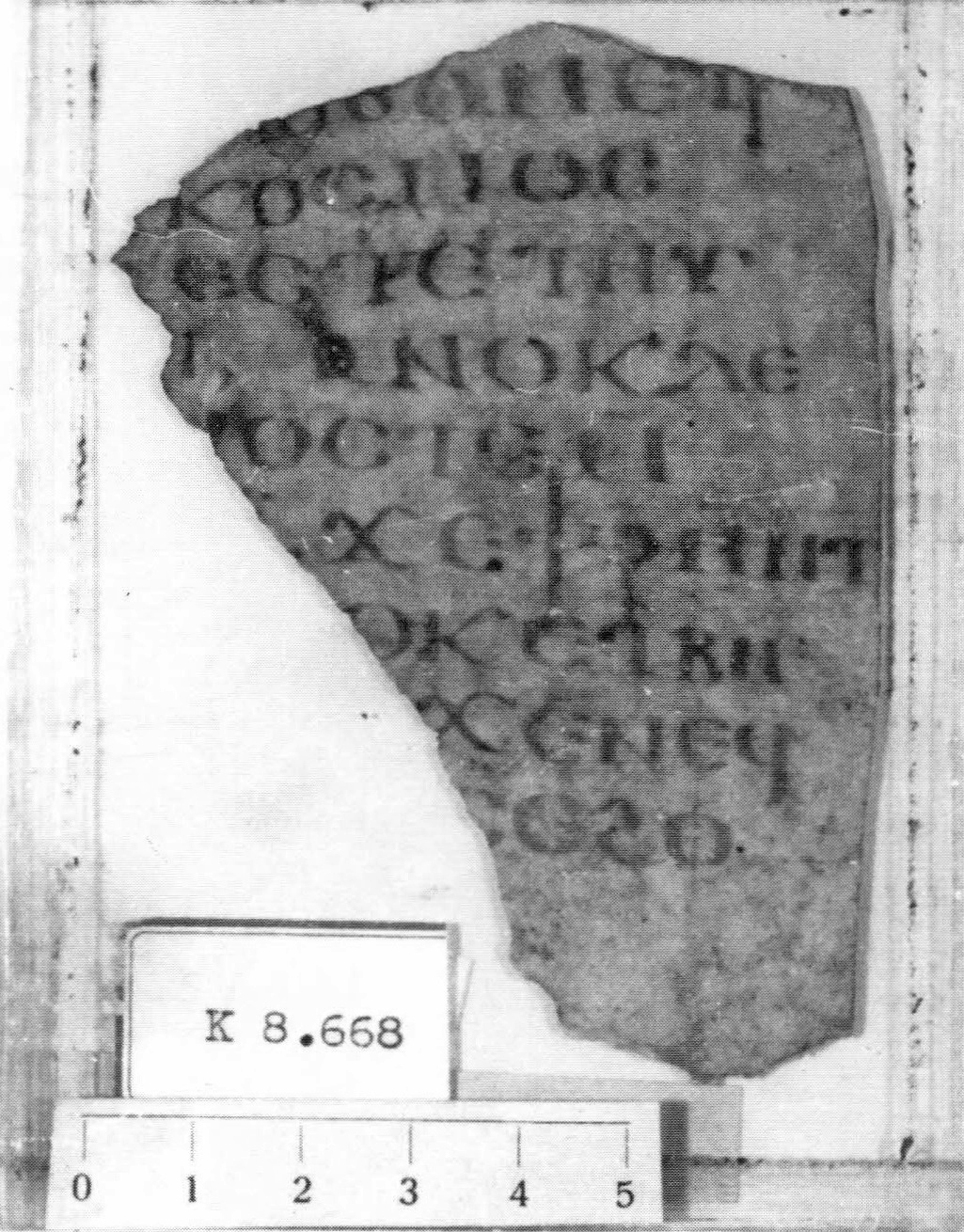
- Text: John 7:10-12
- Date: 8th century
- Script: Greek-Coptic diglot
- Now at: Austrian National Library
- Size: 9.5 x 7 cm
- Type: mixed
- Category: III

Uncial 0238 (in the Gregory-Aland numbering), is a Greek-Coptic uncial manuscript of the New Testament. Paleographically it has been assigned to the 8th century.

== Description ==
The codex contains a small part of the Gospel of John 7:10-12, on one parchment leaf (9.5 cm by 7 cm). Written in one column per page, 10 lines per page, in uncial letters.

Currently it is dated by the INTF to the 8th century.

The manuscript was added to the list of the New Testament manuscripts by Kurt Aland in 1954.

== Text ==
The Greek text of this codex is mixed. Aland placed it in Category III.

It was published by Walter C. Till in 1939.

== Location ==
Currently the codex is housed at the Austrian National Library (Pap. K. 8668) in Vienna.

== See also ==
- List of New Testament uncials
- Coptic versions of the Bible
- Textual criticism
