= Papyrus 42 =

- New Testament manuscript
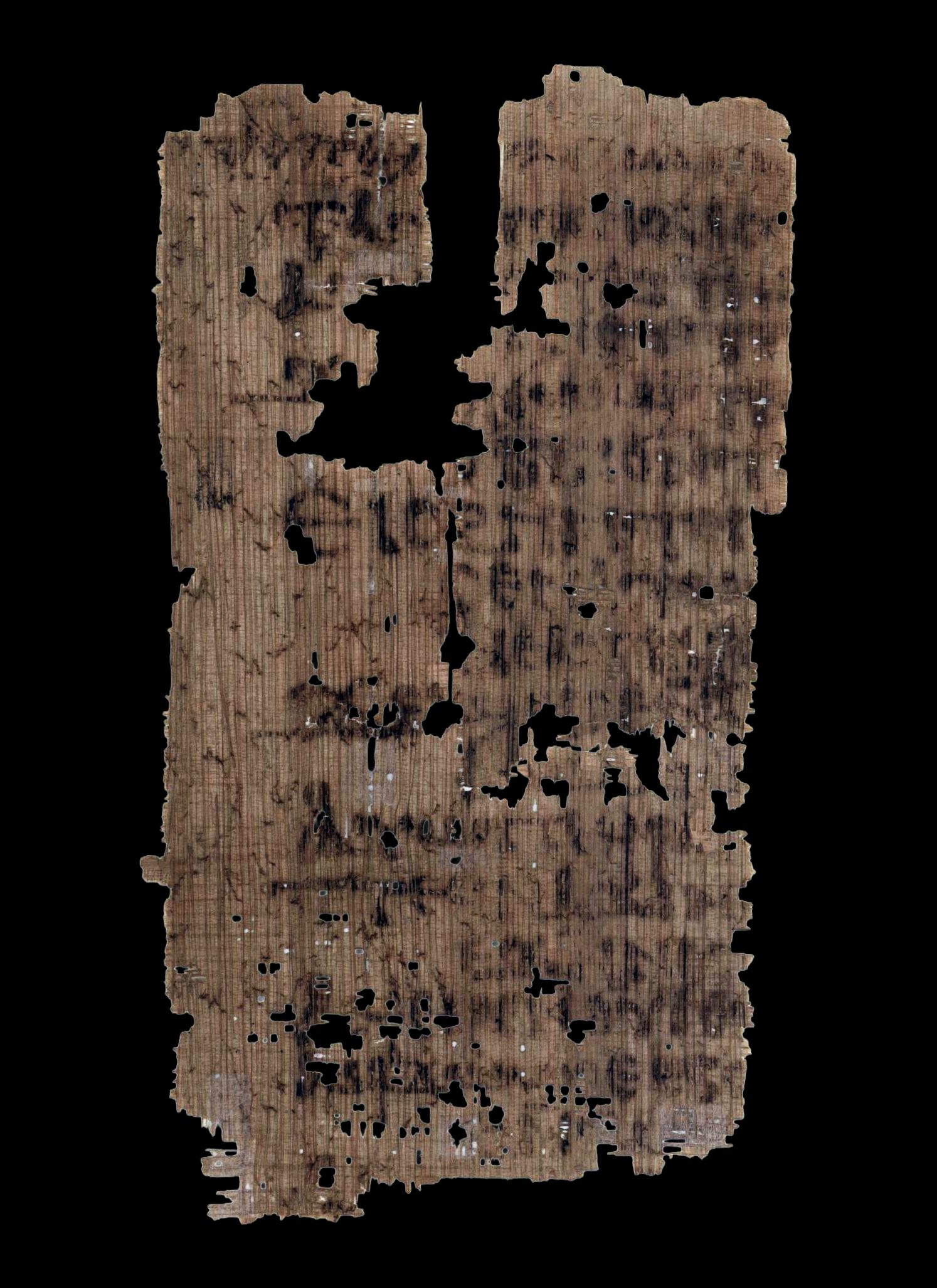
- Recto Luke 1:46–51
- Name: Papyrus Vindobonensis
- Sign: 𝔓^{42}
- Text: Luke 1:54-55+2:29-32 (Greek); Luke 1:46-51 (Coptic)
- Date: 6th/7th century
- Script: Greek/Coptic
- Now at: Vienna, Österr. Nationalbibliothek, Pap. K. 8706
- Size: 14x8 (27x18) cm
- Type: Alexandrian text-type
- Category: II

Papyrus 42 (in the Gregory-Aland numbering), designated by 𝔓^{42}, is a small fragment of six verses from the Gospel of Luke dating to the 6th/7th century. The Greek text of this manuscript is a representative of the Alexandrian text-type with some Byzantine readings. Aland placed it in Category II.

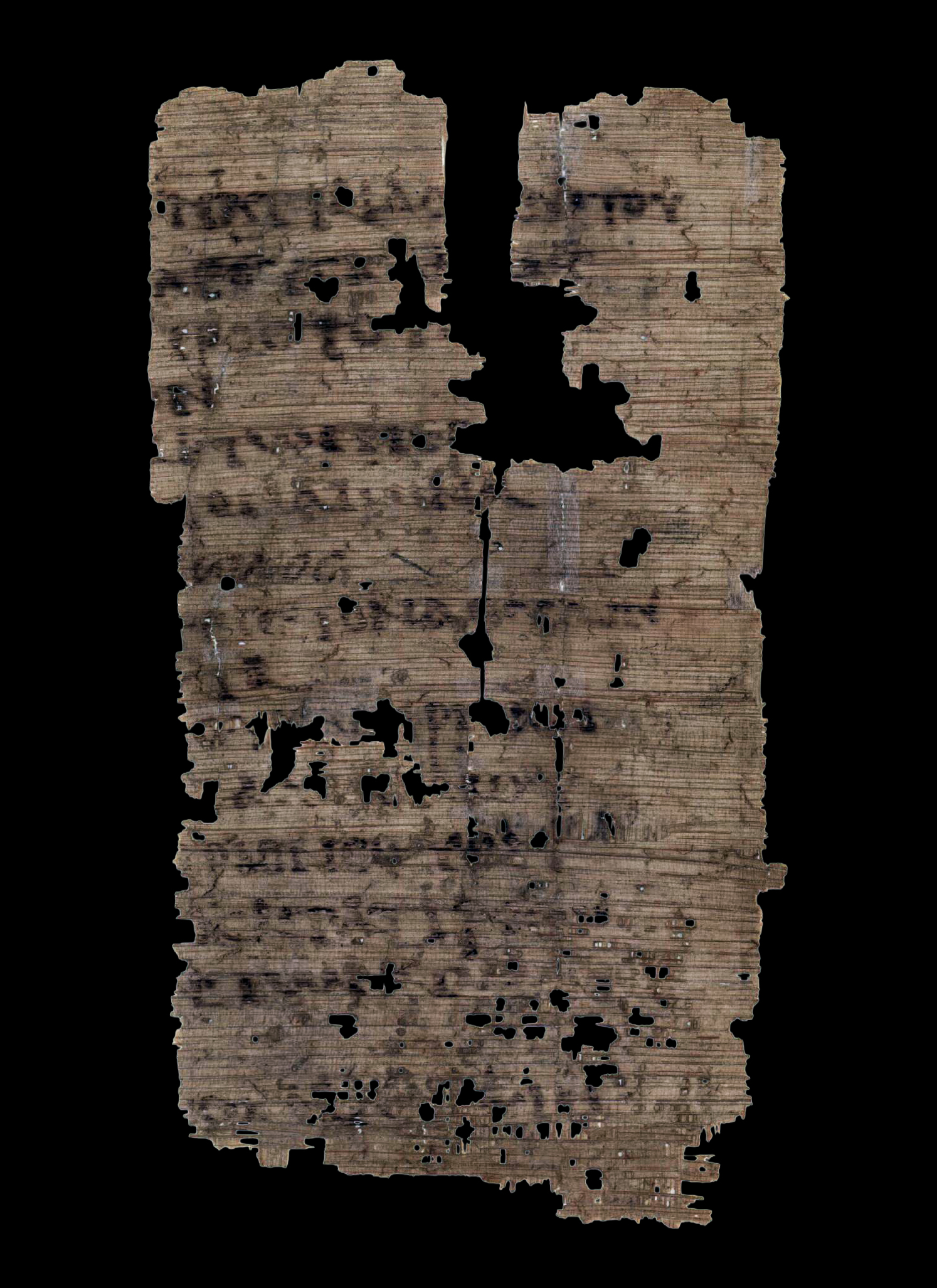
Verso Luke 1:54–55; 2:29–32

The manuscript is housed at the Austrian National Library P. Vindob. K. 8706 at Vienna.

== See also ==
- List of New Testament papyri
- Coptic versions of the Bible
