= Old Testament fragment (Naples, Biblioteca Vittorio Emanuele III, I B 18) =

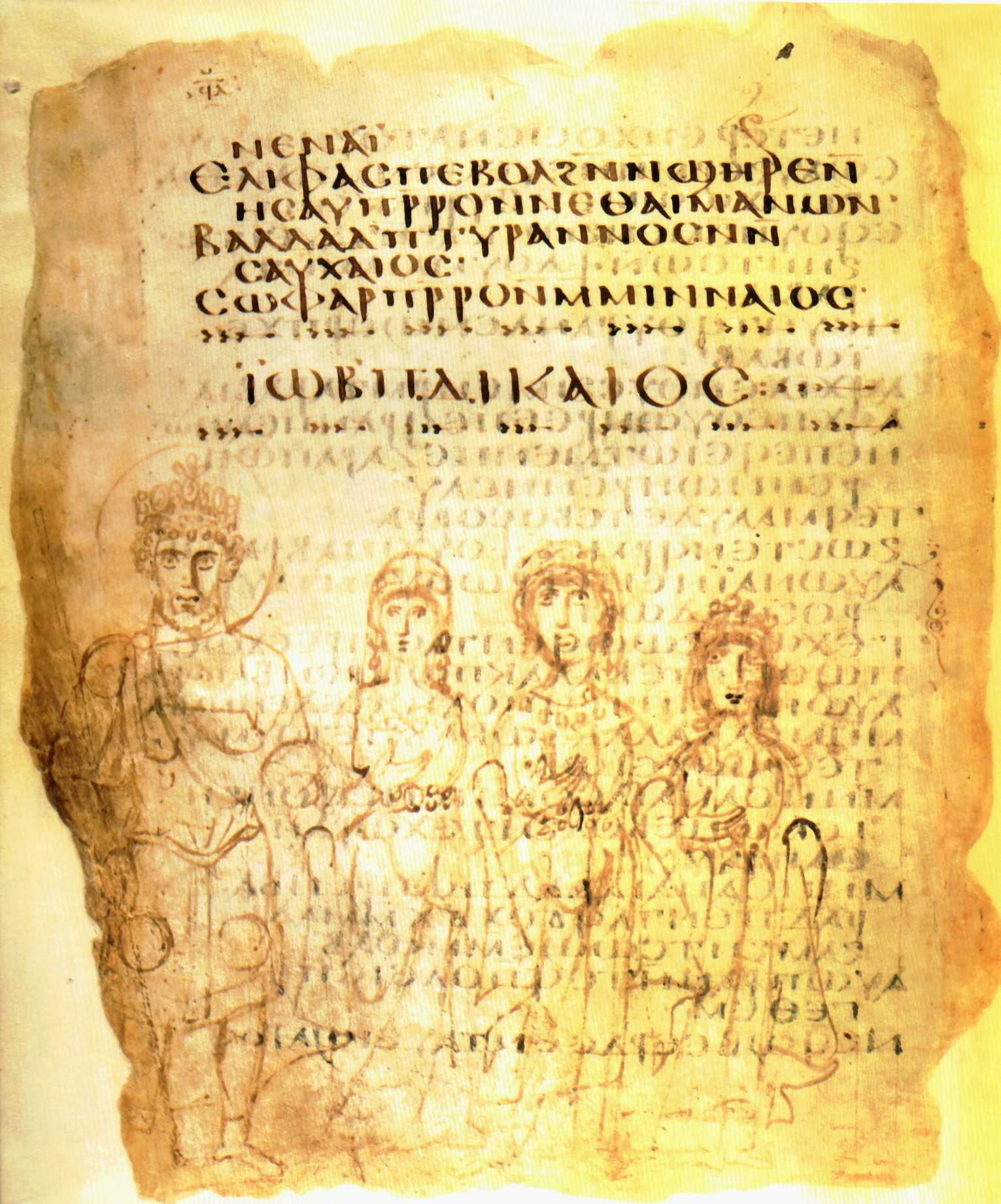
Job and his daughters from folio 4v of Biblioteca Vittorio Emanuele III, MS I B 18.

Naples, Biblioteca Vittorio Emanuele III, MS I B 18 is a fragment of 5th century manuscript of the Old Testament written in uncials in the Sahidic dialect of the Coptic language. The manuscript has only 8 surviving folios and includes the text from Job 40:8 to Proverbs 3:19.

On folio 4 verso there is a large pen drawing illustrating Job and his daughters. Job is pictured as a bearded man wearing a crown and short tunic. His daughters wear tunics with jewels and diadems. The iconography of Job is very different in this manuscript from that in later centuries. Here he is seen as a royal figure while in later portrayals he is seen as humbled and sitting on a dung heap. This miniature, although not executed by a skilled hand, provides an important example of Coptic art in the period of transition from the Hellenistic tradition to a more linear, abstract style.

The manuscript was part of a collection of Coptic manuscripts made by Cardinal Stefano Borgia (1731-1804) and was included in the Museo Borgiano in Velletri. In 1821 the manuscript was sold by Countess Adelaide Borgia to the Biblioteca Borbonica in Naples, which later became the Biblioteca Nazionale Vittorio Emanuele III.
