= Uncial 0128 =

- New Testament manuscript
- Text: Matthew 25 †
- Date: 9th-century
- Script: Greek
- Now at: Bibliothèque nationale de France
- Size: 35 x 25.5 cm
- Type: mixed
- Category: III

Uncial 0128 (in the Gregory-Aland numbering), ε 071 (Soden), is a Greek uncial manuscript of the New Testament, dated paleographically to the 9th-century.

== Description ==
The codex contains a small part of the Matthew 25:32-37.40-42.44-45, on one parchment leaf (35 cm by 25.5 cm). The text is written in two columns per page, 33 lines per page, in uncial letters. It uses accents; it has itacistic errors.

The Greek text of this codex is a representative of the mixed text-type. Aland placed it in Category III.

It is dated by the INTF to the 9th-century.

Formerly it was designated by T^{r}. In 1908 Gregory gave number 0128 to it.

The codex is located now at the Bibliothèque nationale de France (Copt. 129,10 f. 208) in Paris.

== See also ==
- List of New Testament uncials
- Textual criticism
- Uncial 0127
