= Papyrus 96 =

- New Testament manuscript
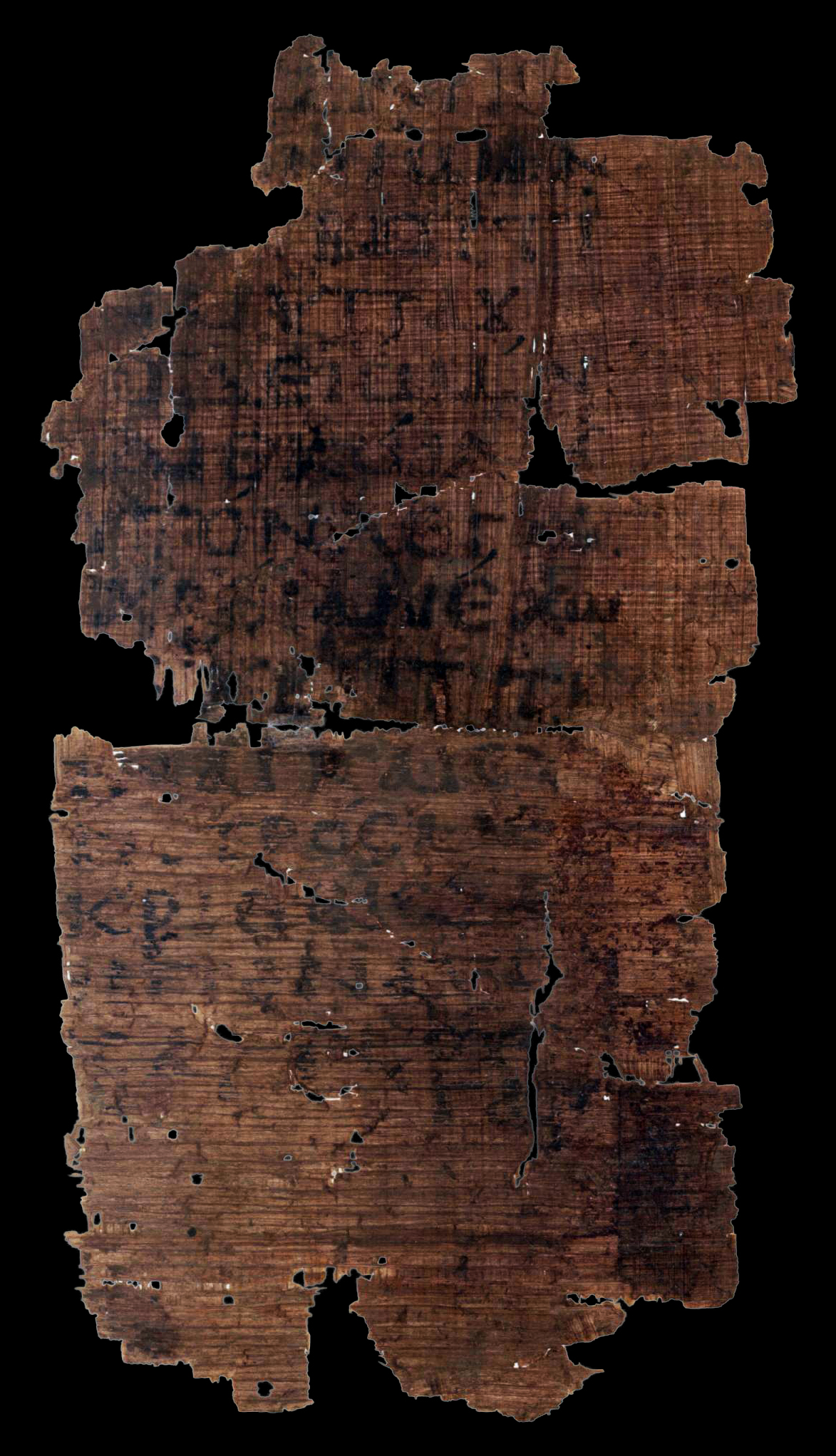
- Recto, Matt 3:13-15
- Sign: 𝔓^{96}
- Text: Matthew 3 †
- Date: 6th century
- Script: Greek- Coptic diglot
- Now at: Österreichische Nationalbibliothek
- Type: Alexandrian text-type

Papyrus 96 (in the Gregory-Aland numbering), designated by 𝔓^{96}, is a copy of the New Testament in Greek and Coptic. It is a diglot papyrus manuscript of the Gospel of Matthew. The surviving texts of Matthew are verses 3:10-12 (Coptic, Greek lost), 3:13-15 (Greek, Coptic lost). The manuscript paleographically has been assigned to the 6th century.

== Text ==
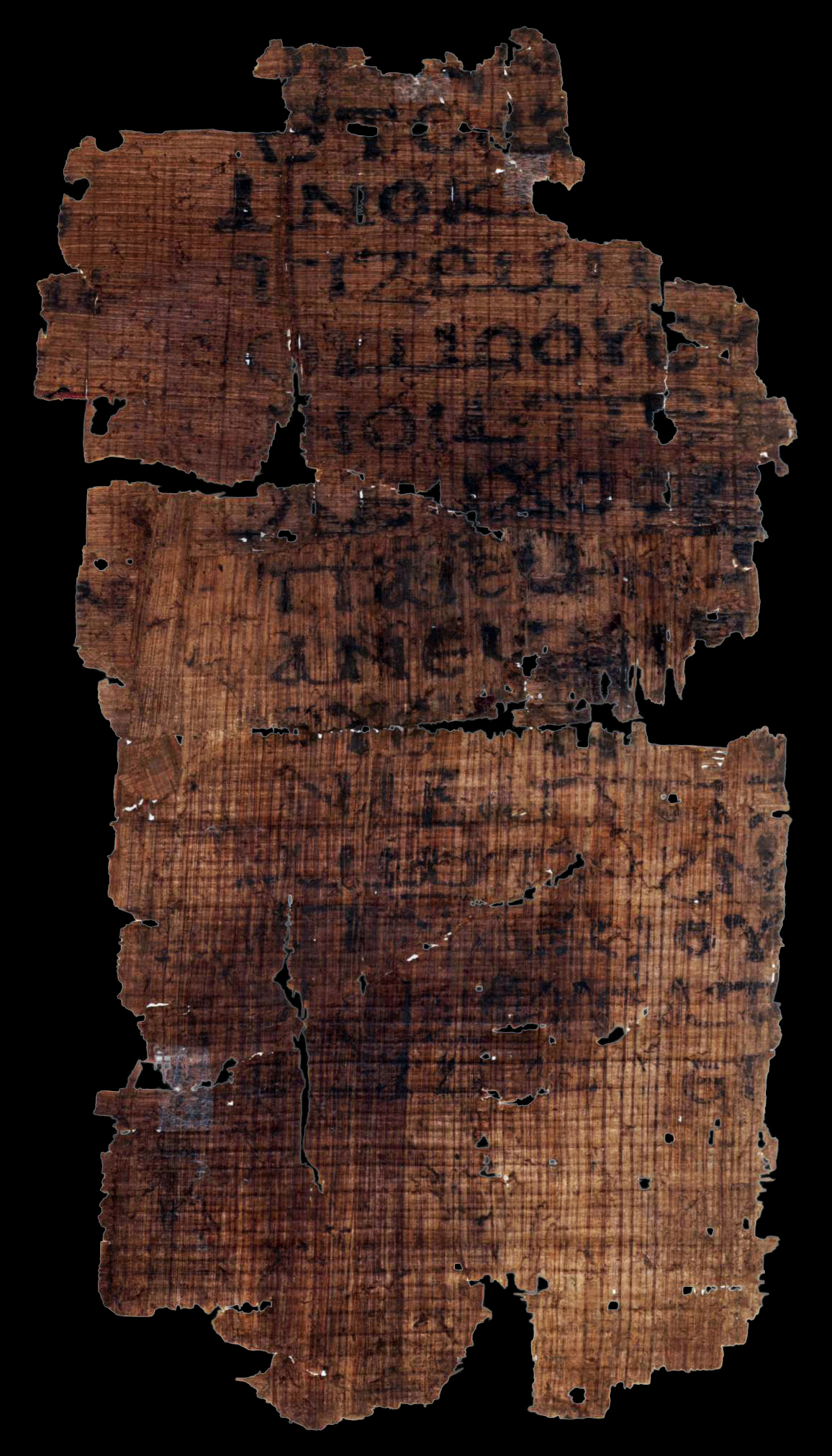
Verso, Matt 3:10-12

The Greek text of this manuscript probably is a representative of the Alexandrian text-type, though the extant portion is too fragmentary for certainty. It is still not assigned to any of Aland's Categories of New Testament manuscripts.

Location

The manuscript is currently housed at the Österreichische Nationalbibliothek (Pap. K. 7244) at Vienna.

== See also ==
- List of New Testament papyri
- Coptic versions of the Bible
