= Uncial 0127 =

- New Testament manuscript
- Text: John 2 †
- Date: 8th-century
- Script: Greek–Coptic
- Now at: Bibliothèque nationale de France
- Size: 26.5 cm by 21.2 cm
- Type: mixed
- Category: III

Uncial 0127 (in the Gregory–Aland numbering), ε 54 (Soden), is a bilingual Greek–Coptic uncial manuscript of the New Testament, dated palaeographically to the 8th century.

== Description ==
The codex contains a small part of the John 2:2-11, on one parchment leaf (26.5 cm by 21.2 cm). The text is written in two columns per page, 22 lines per page, 6-9 letters in line, in large uncial letters.

The Greek text of this codex is a representative of the mixed text-type. Aland placed it in Category III.

Probably it was written in Egypt. It was found in the White Monastery in Egypt.

Formerly it was designated by siglum T^{q}. In 1908 Gregory gave siglum 0127 to it.

It is dated by the INTF to the 8th century.

The codex is located now at the Bibliothèque nationale de France (Copt. 129,10 fol. 207) in Paris.

== See also ==
- List of New Testament uncials
- Textual criticism
- Uncial 0128
