= Septuagint manuscripts =

Manuscripts of the Septuagint translation

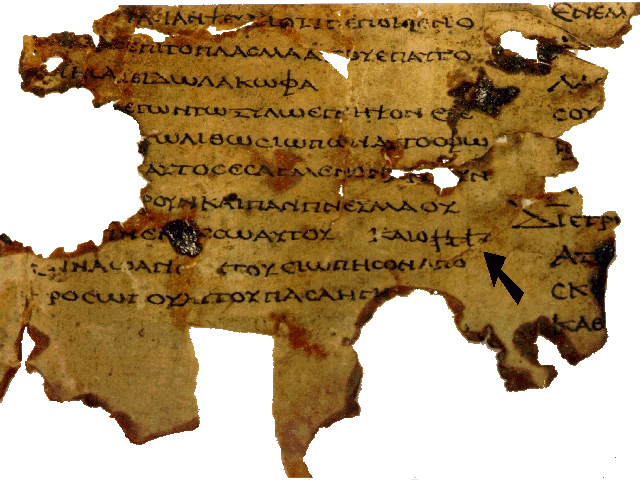
Lower part of col. 18 (according to the reconstruction by E. Tov) of the Greek Minor Prophets Scroll from Nahal Hever containing verses from Habakkuk (c. 50 BCE - 50 CE). The arrow points at the tetragrammaton in paleo-Hebrew script.

The earliest surviving manuscripts of the Septuagint (abbreviated as LXX, meaning ‘seventy’), an ancient (first centuries BCE) translation of the ancient Hebrew Torah into Koine Greek, include three 2nd century BCE fragments from the books of Leviticus and Deuteronomy (Rahlfs nos. 801, 819, and 957) and five 1st century BCE fragments of Genesis, Exodus, Leviticus, Numbers, and Deuteronomy (Rahlfs nos. 802, 803, 805, 848, and 942), only. The vast majority of Septuagint manuscripts are late-antiquity and medieval manuscript versions of the Christian Greek Old Testament tradition.

== Classification ==
There are currently over 2,000 classified manuscripts of the Greek Old Testament. The first list of manuscripts was presented by theologians Arthur Holmes and Jacob Parsons, of which their edition (five volumes between 1798 and 1827) ends with a full list of manuscripts known to them. It enumerates 311 codes (marked with Roman numerals I–XIII and Arabic numerals 14–311), which are designated by their siglum I–XIII, 23, 27, 39, 43, 156, 188, 190, 258, 262.

The codices marked with Roman numerals signify given letters from A to Z. The current list of Septuagint manuscripts is according to the classification of biblical scholar Alfred Rahlfs, this being a list of all known manuscripts proposed by Alfred Rahlfs based on the census of Holmes and Parsons.

=== Division in classification by Rahlfs ===
The table of manuscripts is divided into ten parts:

- Part I: A–Z (specific late antiquity codices in majuscule script).
- Part II: 13–311 (medieval manuscripts, numbering given by Holmes and Parsons)
- Part III: 312–800 (medieval manuscripts of the Greek Old Testament without the Psalms)
- Part IV: 801–1000 (antiquity small fragments of the Torah and late antiquity small fragments of the Greek Old Testament without the Psalms)
- Part V: 1001–1400 (psalms from the twelfth century)
- Part VI: 1401–2000 (medieval fragments psalms uncertain dating younger)
- Part VII: 2001–3000 (medieval small fragments psalter [to the eighth century])
- Part VIII: 3001–5000 (medieval manuscripts of the Greek Old Testament without the Psalms)
- Part IX: 5001–7000 (medieval small fragments of the Greek Old Testament without the Psalms)
- Part X: 7001–xxxx (medieval psalter fragments )

=== Abbreviations ===
- Pent. – Pentateuch (Genesis – Deuteronomy)
- Hept. – Heptateuch (Genesis – Judges)
- Oct. – Octateuch (ἡ ὀκτάτευχος = Genesis – Ruth)
- IV Proph. – Four Major Prophets books.
- XII Proph. – Twelve Minor Prophets books.
- Most book names are not written in full. They are abbreviated from their Latin names which can be seen in the article Books of the Vulgate. Example: Book of Wisdom or, Wisdom of Solomon, is abbreviated as Sap.

==== Acronyms ====
EBE - National Library of Greece

==== Latin terms ====
- aliquot – some
- catenae, catenarum – chain, chains (abbreviated as "cat."). Catena.
- ecloge – safeguard page
- excerpta – items
- graduales – Songs of Ascents (Ps 119-133 by the numbering in the LXX)
- inter alia – among others
- lacunae – missing words/lines/pages
- poenitentiales – Penitential Psalms
- sine – without

== List of manuscripts ==
List taken from Manuscripts of the Septuagint, published by Logos.

=== Part I: A–Z ===
Symbol	Name	Date	Content	Institution	City	Country
א	Codex Sinaiticus	4th Century (after 325 CE);	incl. the Greek text of the entire Bible and the Letter of Pseudo-Barnabas and the Shepherd of Hermas; missing Gen 1:1–46, 28; Ps 105:27–137:6;	BL, Add. 43725; Leip. Uni., Gr. 1; RBN, Gr. 2; Gr. 259; Gr. 843; Fonds. d. Ges. f. alte Lit., Oct 156; Neus Slg. ΜΓ 1	London; Leipzig; Petersburg; Sinai	U. Kingdom; Germany; Russia; Egypt
A	Codex Alexandrinus	5th Century	the complete text of the entire Greek Bible (according to the Alexandrian canon) - leaving only five fragments - and 3 and 4 Maccabees, Odes of Solomon, Psalm 151, and two Epistles of Clement	BL, Royal 1 D. VIII	London	U. Kingdom
B	Codex Vaticanus	4th Century;	contains Gen 46:28 to Heb 9:14	Vat. Lib., Gr. 1209	Vatican City	
C	Codex Ephraemi Rescriptus	5th Century	fragments, Job, Pro, Ec, Ca, Wis, and Sirach survived; NT	BnF, Gr. 9	Paris	France
D	Codex Cottonianus	5th/6th century	burned in 1731, kept a list of lessons from Genesis.	BL, Otto B VI	London	U. Kingdom
F	Codex Ambrosiano A 147	5th century	Genesis 31:15 - Joshua 12:12	Biblioteca Ambrosiana, A. 147 inf.	Milan	Italy
G	Codex Colberto-Sarravianus	4th/5th century	Genesis 31: 5 - Judges 21:12	Bibl. Uniw., Voss. graec. in qu. 8; BnF, Grec 17; RBN, Gr. 3	Leiden; Paris; Petersburg	Netherlands; France; Russia
K	Fragment of Leipzig	7th/8th century	Numbers - Judges	Bibl. Uni., Gr. 2; RBN Gr. 26	Leipzig; Petersburg	Germany; Russia
L	Vienna Genesis	5th/6th century	Genesis with gaps	ÖNB, Theol. gr. 31	Vienna	Austria
M	Codex Coislinianus	7th century	1, 2, 3 Kings	BnF, Coisl. 1	Paris	France
Q	Codex Marchalianus	7th century	Prophets: contains minores and majores	Vat. Lib., Gr. 2125	Vatican City	
R	Codex Veronensis	6th century	Ps. Odes	Bibl. Capit., I	Verona	Italy
T	Codex Turicensis	7th century	Ps. Odes with gaps	Zentralbibl., RP 1	Zurich	Switzerland
U	Fragments Londinensis	7th century	Ps 10:2-18:6; 20:14-34:6	BL, P. Inv. Nr. 37	London	U. Kingdom
N / V	Codex Basiliano-Vaticanus + Codex Venetus	8th century	Bible with gaps	Vat. Lib., Vat. gr. 2106; Bibl. Marc., Gr. 1	Vatican City; Venice	Italy
W	Codex Washingtonianus	3rd century	Minor prophets with gaps	SIL Freer Gall., Ms. V	Washington, D.C.	United States
W^{I}	Codex Freer Greek MS. V	5th century	contains Deut 5:16–16:18; Joshua 3:3–4:10	SIL Freer Gall., Inv. Nr. 06.292	Washington, D.C.	United States
Z	Fragment Tischendorfianus	4th through 8th centuries CE	Jg 16:29-21:5 (with gaps); III Kings 2:19-8:33, 21:26-39; III Kings 8:58-9:1; Ps 8-37 (with gaps); Ez 1:9-2:5, 3:1-9:4, 22:7-26:11, 28:7-16, 35:5-48:3 (with gaps); Ez 36:20-37:14, 41:25-43:18, 47:19-48:4 (with gaps); Dan 3:2-15	Vat. Lib., Vat. syr. 162; BL, Add 14665; Z^{I}; Z^{II}; Z^{III}; Z^{IV}; Z^{V}; Z^{VI}	Vatican City; London	U. Kingdom

=== Part II: 13–311 ===
Symbol	Name	Date	Content	Institution	City	Country
13	Codex Bodleianus (E+I)	c. 950	Cat. in. Ps.Od.	Bodleian Library, Auct. D. 4. 1	Oxford	U. Kingdom
14		11th century	Cat. in Gen. and. Exod.	Vatican Library, Vat. Palat. Gr. 203	Vatican City	
15		10th century	Oct.	BnF, Coisl. Gr. 2	Paris	France
16		11th century	Oct.	Laurentian Library v. 38	Florence	Italy
17		10th century	Cat. in Gen.	Syn. 5, Vlad. 28.	Moscow	Russia
18		11th century	Genesis, Cat. in Exod. - Rut	Laur. Med. Pal. 242	Florence	Italy
19		12th century	Oct., Reg., Par., Esdr., Idt., Est., Mach I-III	Chigi R. VI. 38	Rome	Italy
22		10th century	XII + IV proph.	BL, Royal 1 B. II	London	U. Kingdom
25		11th century	Cat. in Gen. Exod.	Staatsbibl. Gr. 9	Munich	Germany
26		10th century	XII + IV proph.	Vatican Library, Vat. gr. 556	Vatican City	
27		9th century	Ps.	FLB, Membr. I 17	Gotha	Germany
28		10th-11th century	Num.-Jos	Vatican Library, Vat. gr. 2122	Vatican City	
29		14th century	Oct., Reg. I-II (X/XI), Mac. I-III 1,1	Bibl. Marc., Gr. 2	Venice	Italy
30		11th-12th century	Oct.	Bibl. Casanat. 1444	Rome	Italy
31		15th century	Cat. in. Gen.	ÖNB, Theol. Gr. 7	Vienna	Austria
34		12th century	Daniel	Vatican Library, Vat. gr. 803	Vatican City	
35		12th century	Daniel	Vatican Library, Vat. gr. 866	Vatican City	
36		11th century	XII + IV proph.	Vatican Library, Vat. gr. 347	Vatican City	
43	Parisiensis	10th century	Psalms	BnF, Gr. 20	Paris	France
44		15th century	Oct., Reg., Par., Esdr., Mac. I-IV, Est., Idt., Tob. + NT	Stadtbibl. A 1	Zittau	Germany
46		13th/14th century	Old Testament without the Psalms	BnF, Coils. 4	Paris	France
48		10th/11th century	XII + IV proph.	Vatican Library, Vat. gr. 1794	Vatican City	
49		11th century	Cat. in XII proph., Is. c. comm. marg., Cat. in Jer. - Dan.	Laurentian Library, Plut. XI 4	Florence	Italy
51		11th century	XII + IV proph.	Laurentian Library, Plut. X 8	Florence	Italy
52		14th century	Cat. in. Pent. (X/XI), Jos - Rut., Reg., Par., Esdr., Est., Idt., Mac. I-IV, Tob.	Laurentian Library, Acquisti 44	Florence	Italy
53		1439	Oct.	BnF, Gr. 17 A	Paris	France
54		13th/14th century	Oct.	BnF, Gr. 5	Paris	France
55 (+pt. 2)		10th century	Oct., Reg., Par., Esdr., Idt., Est., Tob., Mac. I-IV, Job., Ps., Od.	Vatican Library, Regin. gr. 1	Vatican City	
56		1093	Oct., Reg., Par. I-II 13:15, Mac. I i II (fragm.)	BnF, Gr. 3	Paris	France
57		11th century	Cat. in. Oct.	Vatican Library, Vat. gr. 747	Vatican City	
58		11th century	Oct., Mac. I-IV, Esdr., Est., Idt., Tob., Dan.	Vatican Library, Regin. gr. 10	Vatican City	
59		15th century	Oct. [Lection aus Reg. III)	Univ. Libr., BE 7^{b}. 10	Glasgow	U. Kingdom
60		10th century	Par.	Univ. Libr., Ff. I. 24	Cambridge	U. Kingdom
62		11th century	XII + IV proph., Mac. I-IV	New Coll., 44	Oxford	U. Kingdom
64		10th century	Oct., Reg., Par., Esdr., Est., Tob., Idt., Mac. I-III	BnF, Gr 2	Paris	France
65		14th century	Ps. Od.	Uni.-Bibl., Gr. 4	Leipzig	Germany
66		15th century	PS. Od.	Coll., Bk. 6.2	Eton, Berkshire	U. Kingdom
67		16th century	Ps.Od.	Corp. Chr. Coll., 19	Oxford	U. Kingdom
68		15th century	OT + NT	Bibl. Marc., Gr. 5	Venice	Italy
69		12th century	Ps.Od.	Magdalen Coll., Gr. 9	Oxford	U. Kingdom
71		13th century	Oct., Reg., Par., Esdr., Mac. I-IV, Est., Idt., Tob.	BnF, Gr. 1	Paris	France
72		13th century	Oct.	Bodleian Library, Canonic. gr. 35	Oxford	U. Kingdom
73 (+pt. 2)		11th/12th century	Cat. in. Oct.	Vatican Library, Vat. gr. 746	Vatican City	
74		13th century	Oct., Reg., Par., Esdr., Mac. I-IV, Est., Idt., Tob.	Laurentian Library, S. Marco 700	Florence	Italy
75		1125	Oct.	Univ. Coll., 52	Oxford	U. Kingdom
76		13th century	Oct., Est., Idt., Tob.	BnF, Gr. 4	Paris	France
77		13th/14th century	Cat. in. Oct.	Vatican Library, Vat. gr. 748	Vatican City	
78		12th century	Cat. in Gen. and Exod.	Vatican Library, Vat. gr. 383	Vatican City	
79		12th/13th century	Cat. in Gen.	Vatican Library, Vat. gr. 1668	Vatican City	
80		11th/12th century	Ps.Od.	Christ Church, 44	Oxford	U. Kingdom
81		1184	Ps.Od.	Christ Church, 42	Oxford	U. Kingdom
82		12th century	Oct., Reg.	BnF, Coisl. 3	Paris	France
83		16th century	Cat. in Pent.	Archivo da Torre do Tombo, 540. 669. 668. 671. 670.	Lisbon	Portugal
84		10th/11th century	Oct.	Vatican Library, Vat., gr. 1901	Vatican City	
85		10th century	Oct.	Vatican Library, Vat., gr. 2058	Vatican City	
86		9th/10th century	XII, Is., Jer., Cat. in Ez.,	Vatican Library, Barber. gr. 549	Vatican City	
87		10th century	Cat. in. XII + IV proph.	Vatican Library, Chis. R. VIII 54	Vatican City	
88	Codex Chisianus 87	10th century	Jeremias, Daniel (version LXX), Ezekiel, Isaiah	Vatican Library, Chis. R. VII 45	Vatican City	
90		11th century	Cat. Nicandae in IV proph.	Laurentian Library, Plut. V 5	Florence	Italy
91		11th century	Cat. in XII + IV proph.	Vatican Library, Ottob gr. 452	Vatican City	
92		11th century	Reg.	BnF, Gr. 8	Paris	France
93		13th century	Ruth, Reg., Par., Esdr. II, Est. (L), Mac. I-III, Est. (O), Is.	BL, Royal 1 D. II	London	U. Kingdom
96		11th century	XII + IV proph.	Kgl. Bibl., Ny Kgl. Saml., 4°, Nr. 5	Copenhagen	Denmark
97 (+pt.2)		12th/13th century	Cat. in XII + IV proph.	Vatican Library, Vat. gr. 1153 i 1154	Vatican City	
98		13th century	Cat. in Reg., Par., Esdr., Est., Tob., Idt., Mac. I-II	Real Bibl., Σ-II-19	El Escorial	Spain
99		12th century	Ps.Od.	Trinity Coll., 78	Oxford	U. Kingdom
100		12th century	Ps.Od.	Christ Church, 41	Oxford	U. Kingdom
101		13th century	Ps.Od.	Christ Church, 61	Oxford	U. Kingdom
102		12th century	Ps.Od.	Christ Church, 43	Oxford	U. Kingdom
103		15th century	Prov.	ÖNB, Theol. gr. 238	Vienna	Austria
104		15th century	Cat. in Is. (Comm. in Ps 1-9)	ÖNB, Theol. gr. 229	Vienna	Austria
106		14th century	OT + NT	Bibl. Comun., 187 I-III	Ferrara	Italy
107		1334	Oct., Reg., Par., Esdr., Mac. I-IV, Est., Idt., Tob.	Bibl. Comun., 188 I	Ferrara	Italy
108		13th century	Oct., Reg., Par., Esdr., Idt., Est (L-u, O-tekst), Tob.	Vatican Library, Vat., gr. 330	Vatican City	
109		c. 1235	Cat. in Prov., Cat in Andreae in Is.	ÖNB, Theol. gr. 24	Vienna	Austria
110		1549	Job	ÖNB, Theol. gr. 230	Vienna	Austria
111		9th/10th century	Ps.Od.	Biblioteca Ambrosiana, + 24 sup.	Milan	Italy
112		c. 960	Cat. in Ps.Od.	Biblioteca Ambrosiana, F. 12 sup.	Milan	Italy
113		c. 966	Cat. in Ps.Od.	Biblioteca Ambrosiana, B. 106 sup.	Milan	Italy
118		11th/12th century	Oct.	BnF, Gr. 6	Paris	France
119		10th century	Reg., Par., Esdr.	BnF, Gr. 7	Paris	France
120		11th century	Oct., Reg., Par., Esdr., Mac I-IV, Est.	Bibl. Marc., Gr. 4	Venice	Italy
121		10th century	Oct., Reg., Par., Esdr.	Bibl. Marc., Gr. 3	Venice	Italy
122		15th century	OT + NT	Bibl. Marc., Gr. 6	Venice	Italy
125		14th century	Oct., Reg., Par., Esdr., Mac. I-IV, Est., Idt., Tob., Prov., Eccl., Cant., Sap.	State Historical Museum, Syn. gr. 30	Moscow	Russia
126		1475	Cat. in Gen. and Exod., Lev.-Jg, Idt., Tob.	State Historical Museum, Syn. gr. 19	Moscow	Russia
127		10th century	Oct., Reg., Par.	State Historical Museum, Syn. gr. 31	Moscow	Russia
128		11th century	Oct.	Vatican Library, Vat., gr. 1657	Vatican City	
129		11th/12th century	Oct.	Vatican Library, Vat., gr. 1252	Vatican City	
130		12th/13th century	OT + NT	ÖNB, Theol. gr. 23	Vienna	Austria
131		10th? century	Oct.	ÖNB, Theol. gr. 57	Vienna	Austria
134		11th century	Oct., Reg., Par., Esdr., Mac. I	Laurentian Library, Plut. 5.1	Florence	Italy
135		10th century	Cat. in Gen. and Exod.	Univ.-Bibl., A. N. III. 13	Basel	Switzerland
137		9th/10th century	Cat. in Job	Biblioteca Ambrosiana, D. 73 sup.	Milan	Italy
138		11th century	Cat. in Job.	Biblioteca Ambrosiana, M. 65 sup.	Milan	Italy
139		10th/11th century	Cat. in Prov., and Eccl., and Cant., and Job	Biblioteca Ambrosiana, A. 148 inf.	Milan	Italy
140		12th century	Ps.Od.	Univ.-Bibl., B. X. 33	Basel	Switzerland
141		13th? century	Ps.Od.	Bibl. Naz., B. V. 22	Turin	Italy
142		10th/11th century	Cat. in Ps.	ÖNB, Theol. gr. 8	Vienna	Austria
143		c. 1162	Ps.Od.	ÖNB, Theol. gr. 177	Vienna	Austria
144		XV	Ps.Od.	ÖNB, Theol. gr. 228	Vienna	Austria
145		12th century	Ps.Od	Vatican Library, Borgian., gr. 10	Vatican City	
146		11th/12th century	Ps.Od.	Bibl. Nac., Vit. 26-5	Madrid	Spain
147		12th century	Cat. in Prov. and Eccl. and Cant. and Job, XII + IV proph	Bodleian Library, Laud. gr. 30^{A}	Oxford	U. Kingdom
148		11th century	Dan.	Vatican Library, Vat., gr. 2025	Vatican City	
149		11th century	Cat. in Job and Prov., Eccl., Cant., Wis., Ps.Sal., Sir.	ÖNB, Theol. gr. 11	Vienna	Austria
150		15th century	Ps.Od.	Bibl. Comun., 114	Ferrara	Italy
151		13th century	Ps.Od.	Staatl. Mus. Kupferstichkabinandt, Ham. 119	Berlin	Germany
152		c. 1080	Ps.Od.	Bibl. Marc., Append. I 32	Venice	Italy
154		15th century	Ps.Od.	Staatsbibl., Phill. 1486	Berlin	Germany
155		11th century	Eccl., Cant., Wis., Sir.	Bodleian Library, Auct. T. 2. 4.	Oxford	U. Kingdom
156		9th century	Ps.	Univ.-Bibl., A. VII. 3	Basel	Switzerland
157		12th century	Job, Prov., Eccl., Cant., Wis., Sir.	Univ.-Bibl., B. VI. 23	Basel	Switzerland
158		13th century	Reg., Par.	Univ.-Bibl., B. VI. 22	Basel	Switzerland
159		10th/11th century	Eccl., Prov., Cant.	SR Archiv, A. 107	Moscow	Russia
160		14th/15th century	Job	Sächs. Landesbibl., A. 66^{B}	Dresden	Germany
161		14th century	Prov., Eccl., Cant., Job	SR Archiv, A. 170	Moscow	Russia
162		13th century	Ps.Od.	BnF, Gr. 24	Paris	France
163		13th century	Ps.Od.	BnF, Gr. 26	Paris	France
164		14th century	Ps.Od.	BL, Harl. 5533	London	U. Kingdom
165		14th century	Ps.Od.	BL, Harl. 5534	London	U. Kingdom
166		1284	Ps.Od.	BL, Harl. 5535	London	U. Kingdom
167		14th century	Ps.Od.	BL, Harl. 5553	London	U. Kingdom
168		11th century	Ps.Od.	BL, Harl. 5570	London	U. Kingdom
169		12th century	Ps.Od.	BL, Harl. 5571	London	U. Kingdom
170		12th century	Ps.Od.	BL, Harl. 5582	London	U. Kingdom
171		14th century	Ps.Od.	BL, Harl. 5653	London	U. Kingdom
172		1478	Ps.Od.	BL, Harl. 5737	London	U. Kingdom
173		16th century	Ps.Od.	BL, Harl. 5738	London	U. Kingdom
174		1153	Ps.	BL, Harl. 5786	London	U. Kingdom
175		11th century	Ps.Od.	BL, Royal 2. A. VI	London	U. Kingdom
176		13th century	Ps.Od.	BL, Harl. 5563	London	U. Kingdom
177		13th century	Ps.Od.	BnF, Gr. 27	Paris	France
178		1059	Ps.Od.	BnF, Gr. 40	Paris	France
179		12th century	Ps.Od.	BnF, Gr. 41	Paris	France
180		12th century	Ps.Od.	BnF, Gr. 42	Paris	France
181		12th century	Cat. Nicandae in Ps.	FLB, Membr. I 77	Gotha	Germany
182		13th century	PS.Od.	Vatican Library, Chis., R. IV. 3	Vatican City	
183		15th century	PS.Od.	Vatican Library, Chis., R. IV. 4	Vatican City	
186		15th century	Ps.Od.	ÖNB, Theol. gr. 298	Vienna	Austria
187		10th century	Ps.Od.	BnF, Coisl. 10	Paris	France
188		7th century	Ps 18:14–71:19	BnF, Coisl. 186, Bl. 156ff	Paris	France
189		1304	Ps.Od.	BnF, Coisl. 13	Paris	France
190		10th century	Cat. in Ps.Od.	BnF, Coisl. 187	Paris	France
191		994	Cat. in. Ps.Od.	RBN Gr. 64 (earlier Paris, Coisl. 188)	Petersburg	Russia
192		12th/13th century	Ps.Od.	BnF, Gr. 13	Paris	France
193		12th century	Ps.Od.	BnF, Gr. 21	Paris	France
194		12th century	Ps.Od.	BnF, Gr. 22	Paris	France
195		12th century	Ps.Od.	BnF, Gr. 23	Paris	France
196		12th century	Ps.Od.	BnF, Gr. 25	Paris	France
197		14th century	Ps.Od.	BnF, Gr. 29	Paris	France
198		9th century	XII proph., Is.–Ez.	BnF, Gr. 14	Paris	France
199		11th? 15th?	Ps.Od.	Bibl. Estense, Gr. 37	Modena	Italy
200		12th century	Ps.Od.	Bodleian Library, Barocc. 15	Oxford	U. Kingdom
201		15th/16th century	Ps.Od.	Bodleian Library, Barocc. 107	Oxford	U. Kingdom
202		1404	Ps.Od.	Bodleian Library, Cromwell 5	Oxford	U. Kingdom
203		1336	Ps.Od.	Bodleian Library, Laud. gr. 2	Oxford	U. Kingdom
204		11th century	Ps.	Bodleian Library, Laud. gr. 1 (C. 38)	Oxford	U. Kingdom
205		13th? century	Ps.Od.	Trinity Coll., O. 2. 38	Oxford	U. Kingdom
206		15th century	Ps.Od.	Gonville and Casius Coll., 348	Oxford	U. Kingdom
208		16th century	Ps.Od	WLB., Cod. bibl. Q. 4	Stuttgart	Germany
211		12th century	Ps.Od.	Vatican Library, Vat., gr. 1541	Vatican City	
212		10th century	Ps.	Vatican Library, Vat., gr. 1542	Vatican City	
213		12th century	Ps.Od.	Vatican Library, Vat., gr. 1848	Vatican City	
214		13th century	Ps.Od.	Vatican Library, Vat., gr. 1870	Vatican City	
215		1011	Ps.Od.	Vatican Library, Vat., gr. 1873	Vatican City	
216		12th century	Ps.Od.	Vatican Library, Vat., gr. 1927	Vatican City	
217		1021	Ps.Od.	Vatican Library, Vat., gr. 341	Vatican City	
219		c. 1076	Ps.Od.	ÖNB, Theol. gr. 336	Vienna	Austria
222		1509	Ps.Od.	ÖNB, Theol. gr. 241	Vienna	Austria
223		16th century	Ps.Od.	ÖNB, Theol. gr. 234	Vienna	Austria
224		1303	Ps.Od.	Bibl. Naz., Naples ex Vindob. gr. 22	Naples	Italy
225		14th?	Ps.Od.	Bibl. Univ., 2925	Naples	Italy
226		13th century	Ps.Od.	Vatican Library, Barber. gr. 372	Vatican City	
227		12th century	Ps.Od.	Vatican Library, Barber. gr. 322	Vatican City	
228		13th century	XVI proph. c. cat. (excerpta), Cat. in Job	Vatican Library, Vat. gr. 1764	Vatican City	
230		10th/11th century	Dan.	Vatican Library, Vat. gr. 1641	Vatican City	
231		10th/11th century	XII + IV proph.	Vatican Library, Vat. gr. 1670	Vatican City	
232		10th century	Dan.	Vatican Library, Vat. gr. 2000	Vatican City	
233		10th century	XII + IV proph.	Vatican Library, Vat. gr. 2067	Vatican City	
235		10th/11th century	Sus.	Vatican Library, Vat. gr. 2048	Vatican City	
236		11th century	Cat. in Ios-Ruth and Reg., Par., Esdr., Est., Idt., Tob., Mac. I-IV	Vatican Library, Vat. gr. 331	Vatican City	
239		1046	XII + IV proph.	Bibl. Univ., 2603	Bologna	Italy
240		1285	Cat. in XII proph.	Laurentian Library, Plut. XI 22	Florence	Italy
241		c. 1640	Jos - Chr. Prov., Eccl., Cant.	British Museum, Harley MS 7522 A	London	U. Kingdom
242		14th century	Cat. in Reg.	ÖNB, Theol. gr. 135	Vienna	Austria
243		10th century	Cat. in Reg., Par., Esdr., Est., Tob., Idt., Mac. I-II	BnF, Coisl. 8	Paris	France
244		11th century	Reg.	Vatican Library, Vat. gr. 333	Vatican City	
245		12th century	Reg., Esdr. I	Vatican Library, Vat. gr. 334	Vatican City	
246 (+pt. 2) (+pt. 3)		1195	Oct., Reg., Par. II	Vatican Library, Vat. gr. 1238	Vatican City	
247		12th century	Reg.	Vatican Library, Urbin. gr. 1	Vatican City	
248		13th century	Prov., Eccl., Cant., Job, Wis., Sir., Esdr., Est., Tob., Idt.	Vatican Library, Vat. gr. 346	Vatican City	
249		12th century	Cat. in Job, Wis., Sir., Est., Tob., Idt.	Vatican Library, Pii. II gr. 1	Vatican City	
250		13th century	Cat. in Job	BSB, gr. 148	Munich	Germany
251		14th century	Cat. in Job	Laurentian Library, Plut. V 27	Florence	Italy
252		10th century	Job, Prov., Eccl., Cant.	Laurentian Library, Plut. VIII 27	Florence	Italy
253		11th century	Job, Prov., Eccl., Cant., Wis., Ps.Sam., Sir.	Vatican Library, Vat., gr. 336	Vatican City	
254		10th century	Job, Prov., Eccl., Cant., Wis., Sir.	Vatican Library, Vat., gr. 337	Vatican City	
255		10th century	Cat. in Job	Vatican Library, Vat., gr. 338	Vatican City	
256		13th century	Cat. in Job	Vatican Library, Vat., gr. 697	Vatican City	
257		10th century	Cat. in Job 11:1-40:31	Vatican Library, Vat., gr. 745	Vatican City	
258 (+pt. 2)		9th century	Cat. in Job	Vatican Library, Vat., gr. 749	Vatican City	
259		10th/11th century	Cat. in Job	Vatican Library, Palat., gr. 230	Vatican City	
260		10th/11th century	Cat. in Job and Prov.–Cant., Wis., Ps. Sal., Sir.	Kgl. Bibl., Gamle Kgl. Saml., 6	Copenhagen	Denmark
261		1323	Prov. (z. T. Cat.), Eccl., Wis., Job, Sir.	Laurentian Library, Plut. VII 30	Florence	Italy
263 {lost}		15th century	Ps.	Kgl. Bibl., Gamle Kgl. Saml., 1311	Copenhagen	Denmark
264 (+pt. 2)		10th/11th century	Cat. in Ps.Od.	Vatican Library, Ottob., gr. 398	Vatican City	
265 (+pt. 2)		12th/13th century	Ps.Od.	Vatican Library, Palat., gr. 381	Vatican City	
266		10th century	Ps.Od.	Vatican Library, Vat., gr. 2101	Vatican City	
267		14th century	Ps.Od.	Vatican Library, Ottob., gr. 294	Vatican City	
268		11th century	Cat. in Ps.Od.	Vatican Library, Vat., gr. 2057	Vatican City	
270		12th century	Ps.Od.	Vatican Library, Vat., gr. 1864	Vatican City	
271		10th/11th century	Cat. in Ps.Od.	Vatican Library, Vat., gr. 1747	Vatican City	
272		12th/13th century	Cat. Nicandae in Ps.	Vatican Library, Palat., gr. 247	Vatican City	
273		14th century	Ps.Od.	Vatican Library, Regin., gr. 40	Vatican City	
275		12th century	Ps.Od.	Vatican Library, Vat., gr. 1874	Vatican City	
277		14th century	Ps.Od.	ÖNB, Theol. gr. 327	Vienna	Austria
278		12th century	Ps.Od.	Laurentian Library, Plut. V 23	Florence	Italy
279		12th century	Ps.Od.	Laurentian Library, Plut. V 33	Florence	Italy
280		11th century	Ps.Od.	Laurentian Library, Plut. V 5	Florence	Italy
281		11th century	Ps.Od.	Laurentian Library, Plut. V 18	Florence	Italy
282		15th century	Ps.Od.	Laurentian Library, Plut. V 25	Florence	Italy
283		11th century	Ps.Od.	Laurentian Library, Plut. VI 36	Florence	Italy
284		1403	Ps.Od.	Laurentian Library, Plut. V 17	Florence	Italy
285		13th century	Ps.Od.	Laurentian Library, Plut. V 34	Florence	Italy
286		1101	Comm. aut Cat. in Ps.Od.	Laurentian Library, Plut. V 30	Florence	Italy
287		11th/12th century	Cat. in Ps.	Laurentian Library, Plut. V 14	Florence	Italy
290		14th century	Ps.Od.	Laurentian Library, Aedil. 222	Florence	Italy
291		11th century	Ps.Od.	Laurentian Library, Plut. V 39	Florence	Italy
292		11th century	Cat. in Ps.Od.	Laurentian Library, Plut. VI 3	Florence	Italy
293		15th century	Ps.Od.	Laurentian Library, Plut. V 37	Florence	Italy
294		12th century	Ps.	Emmanuel Coll., III. 3. 22	Cambridge	U. Kingdom
295		15th/16th century	Cat. (?) in Prov., Eccl., Cant.	Vatican Library, Ottobon., gr. 56	Vatican City	
296		11th century	Job., Prov., Eccl., Cant., Wis., Sir.	Vatican Library, Palat., gr. 337	Vatican City	
297		12th century	Cat. in Prov. [hom. Gregory of Nyssa in Cant.]	Vatican Library, Vat., gr. 1802	Vatican City	
299		1202	Cat. in Eccl.	Vatican Library, Vat., gr. 1604	Vatican City	
301		9th century	Is.	ÖNB, Theol. gr. 93	Vienna	Austria
305		15th century	Cat. in Is.	Kgl. Bibl., Gamle Kgl. Saml., 1319	Copenhagen	Denmark
306		11th century	Is., Ez.	BnF, Gr. 16	Paris	France
307		13th century	Sir.	BSB, gr. 129	Munich	Germany
308		14th century	Is.	Vatican Library, Vat., gr. 1509	Vatican City	
309		10th/11th century	Cat. in Is.	Vatican Library, Vat., gr. 755	Vatican City	
310		13th century	Cat. in XII proph.	State Historical Museum, Syn. gr. 208	Moscow	Russia
311		12th century	Prov., Eccl., Cant., Wis., Sir., XII + IV proph., Est., Idt., Tob., Mac. I-III	State Historical Museum, Syn. gr. 354	Moscow	Russia

=== Part III: 312–800 ===
==== 312–500 ====
Symbol	Name	Date	Content	Institution	City	Country
312		12th century	Mac. IV	Άγιας, 94	Andros	Greece
313		11th century	Cat. in Oct. and Reg.	EBE, 43	Athens	Greece
314		13th century	Oct., Reg., Par., Esdr., Est., Idt., Tob.	EBE, 44	Athens	Greece
315		13th century	Sir., Cant.	EBE, 329	Athens	Greece
316		11th century	Mac. IV	Staatsbibl., Graec. fol. 17	Berlin	Germany
317		11th century	Mac. IV	Вατοπαιδίου, 84	Mount Athos	Greece
318		10th/11th century	Oct., Est., Idt., Tob., Reg.	Вατοπαιδίου, 598	Mount Athos	Greece
319		1021	Oct., Est., Tob., Idt.	Вατοπαιδίου, 600	Mount Athos	Greece
320		12th century	Cat. in Lev.-Ruth	Вατοπαιδίου, 602	Mount Athos	Greece
321		14th century	Exod.-Ruth, Par.	Вατοπαιδίου, 603	Mount Athos	Greece
322		12th century	Mac. IV	Διονυσίου, 54	Mount Athos	Greece
323		14th century	Dan.	Διονυσίου, 159	Mount Athos	Greece
324		15th century	Dan.	Διονυσίου, 167	Mount Athos	Greece
325		14th century	Mac. IV	Διονυσίου, 181	Mount Athos	Greece
326		16th century	Cant.	Διονυσίου, 282	Mount Athos	Greece
327		1577	Cant.	Έσφιγμένου, 131	Mount Athos	Greece
328		11th century	Cat. in Jos-Ruth and. in Reg.	Ίβήρων, 15	Mount Athos	Greece
329		13th century	Cat. Procopii in Prov.	Ίβήρων, 38	Mount Athos	Greece
330		13th century	Cant.	Ίβήρων, 76	Mount Athos	Greece
331		1452	Cant.	Ίβήρων, 80	Mount Athos	Greece
332		15th century	Tob., Job. Est., Mac. I-IV	Ίβήρων, 165	Mount Athos	Greece
333		10th century	Cat. Procopii in Prov.	Ίβήρων, 379	Mount Athos	Greece
334		1514	Ruth, Reg.	Ίβήρων, 382	Mount Athos	Greece
335		15th century	Mac. IV	Ίβήρων, 396	Mount Athos	Greece
336		14th century	Job, Prov., Eccl., Cant., Wis., Sir., Ps.Sal.	Ίβήρων, 555	Mount Athos	Greece
337		14th century	Job, Eccl.	Ίβήρων, 615	Mount Athos	Greece
338		14th century	Cat. in Prov. and Eccl.	Ίβήρων, 676	Mount Athos	Greece
339		11th century	Job. Prov., Eccl., Cant., Wis., Sir.	Κουτλουμουσίου, 8	Mount Athos	Greece
340		11th century	Mac. I i IV, Esd. I	Κουτλουμουσίου, 39	Mount Athos	Greece
341		11th century	Lect. (Rdz 1:5-13)	Κουτλουμουσίου, 82	Mount Athos	Greece
342		13th century	Reg., Eccl.	Histor. u. andhnol. Gesellsch., 200	Athens	Greece
343		11th century	Oct.	Λαύρα, 352	Mount Athos	Greece
344		10th century	Oct., Par. II fragm.	Παντοκράτορος, 24; Patr.-Bibl., Τάφου 510 β	Mount Athos; Jerusalem	Greece; Israel
345		11th century	Jer. fragm.	Παντοκράτορος, 48	Mount Athos	Greece
346		1326	Oct., Reg., Par.	Πρωτάτου, 53	Mount Athos	Greece
347		13th century	Mac. II i III fragm.	Σταυρονικήτα, 29	Mount Athos	Greece
348		16th century	Cat. Polychronii in Eccl. and Cant.	Univ.-Bibl., A. VII. 6	Basel	Switzerland
349		13th century	Cat. in XII proph. and Ez. and Dan.	Univ.-Bibl., B. II. 14	Basel	Switzerland
350 {skreślony}		c. 1540	Tht. qu. in Oct. Reg. Par.	Staatsbibl., Phill. 1405	Berlin	Germany
351		c. 1540	Cat. in Job	Staatsbibl., Phill. 1407	Berlin	Germany
352		c. 1540	Cat. Procopii in Prov., Cat. in Eccl., Cat. Procopii in Cant.	Staatsbibl., Phill. 1411	Berlin	Germany
353		c. 1540	Cat. in Prov. and Eccl. and Cant.	Staatsbibl., Phill. 1412	Berlin	Germany
354		c. 1540	Cat. in Cant.	Staatsbibl., Phill. 1413	Berlin	Germany
355		12th century	Cat. in Job	Bibl. Comun., A. I. 2	Bologna	Italy
356		16th century	Cat. in Prov.	Bibl. Comun., A. I. 6	Bologna	Italy
357		12th century	Eccl.	Bibl. Univ., 3640	Bologna	Italy
358		12th century	Sir.	Corp. Chr. Coll., 486	Cambridge	U. Kingdom
359		13th/14th century	Eccl., Cant., Sap.	Trinity Coll., O. I. 53	Cambridge	U. Kingdom
360 (+pt. 2)		11th? century	Cat. in Prov. and Cant.	Trinity Coll., O. I. 54 i 55	Cambridge	U. Kingdom
361		16th century	Cat. in Cant.	Duke Univ. Libr., Phillipps 11609	Durham	United States
362		15th/16th century	Cat. Olimp. in Job	YBR, Ms. gr. 257 (Phillipps 14041)	New Haven	United States
363		14th century	Cat. in Prov.	Βιβλ. τ. Άρχιεπισκοπής, 28	Leucosia	Cyprus
[364] burnt		14th century	Oct.	Μέγα Σπελ. 68	Kalavryta	Greece
365		15th century	Dan.	Ίωάννου τοὒ Θεολόγου, 21	Lesbos	Greece
366		15th century	Mac. IV	Λυκ. Μυτ., 4	Lesbos	Greece
367		11th century	Mac. IV	John Rylands Library, Gr. 8	Manchester	U. Kingdom
368		11th century (1426)	Gen. fragm.	Biblioteca Ambrosiana, Q. 6 sup.	Milan	Italy
369		9th/10th century	Is. fragm.	Emmanuel Coll., III. 3. 3, Abt. VII	Cambridge	U. Kingdom
370		XI-14th century	Oct., Reg., Esdr., Mac., Est., Idt., Tob. (with gaps)	Vatican Library, Chis. R VIII 61	Vatican City	
371		16th century	Cat. in Eccl. and Cant.	Real Bibl., R-I-3	El Escorial	Spain
372		12th century	Reg. II-IV	Real Bibl., R-II-2	El Escorial	Spain
373		1586	Cat. in Gen. and Exod.	Real Bibl., Σ-I-6	El Escorial	Spain
374		1572	Cat. Marcellini in Gen.	Real Bibl., Σ-II-17	El Escorial	Spain
375		16th century	Cat. in Prov.	Real Bibl., Υ (griech.)-II-2	El Escorial	Spain
376		15th century	Oct., Reg. I-II	Real Bibl., Υ (griech.)-II-5	El Escorial	Spain
377		11th century	Cat. in Is.	Real Bibl., Υ (griech.)-II-12	El Escorial	Spain
378		1573	Cat. in Cant.	Real Bibl., Ψ-I-4	El Escorial	Spain
379		16th century	Cat. in Reg., Par., Esdr., Est., Tob., Idt., Mac. I-II	Real Bibl., Ψ-I-8	El Escorial	Spain
380		12th century	Ez., Dan., Mac. IV	Real Bibl., Ω-1-5	El Escorial	Spain
381		11th century	Oct., Reg., Par., Esdr., Est., Tob., Idt., Mac. I-III	Real Bibl., Ω-1-13	El Escorial	Spain
382		15th century	Cant.	Laurentian Library, S. Marco 694	Florence	Italy
383		11th century	Dan.	Laurentian Library, Plut. IV 4	Florence	Italy
384		12th century	Cat. Nicol. Muzani in Is.	Laurentian Library, Plut. V 8	Florence	Italy
385		14th century	Mac. IV	Laurentian Library, Plut. IX 33	Florence	Italy
386		13th/14th century	Cat. in Job	Laurentian Library, Plut. X 29	Florence	Italy
387		14th century	Mac. IV	Laurentian Library, Plut. LXIX 10	Florence	Italy
388		14th century	Mac. IV	Laurentian Library, Plut. LXIX 20	Florence	Italy
389		16th century	Cat. in Cant.	Bibl. Riccard., 7	Florence	Italy
390		1075	Cat. in Prov. and Eccl. and Cant.	Bibl. Franz., 2	Genoa	Italy
391		11th century	Mac. IV	Bibl. Franz., 35	Genoa	Italy
392		10th century	Oct., Est., Tob., Idt.	A. γ. I	Grottaferrata	Italy
393		8th century	XII + IV proph.	A. γ. XV; Vatican Library, Vat. gr. 1658	Grottaferrata; Vatican City	Italy.
394		10th century	Oct. fragm.	Vatican Library, Vat. gr. 2306; A. δ. XXIII	Vatican City; Grottaferrata	. Italy
395		10th century	Cat. in Job	Univ.-Bibl., XXV B 3	Prague	Czech Republic
396		15th century	Sap.	Private Library Earl of Tollemache	Helmingham Hall	U. Kingdom
397		11th century	Mac. IV	EBE, Μετ. Τάφου, 14	Athens	Greece
398		14th century	Cat. in XII proph.	EBE, Μετ. Τάφου, 17	Athens	Greece
399		12th century	Cat. in Prov.	EBE, Μετ. Τάφου, 51	Athens	Greece
400		11th century	Cat. in Gen.	EBE, Μετ. Τάφου, 224	Athens	Greece
401		14th century	Dan.	EBE, Μετ. Τάφου, 244	Athens	Greece
402		14th century	Tob.	Patr.-Bibl., Σάβα 105	Jerusalem	Israel
403		1542	Am., Is., Ez.	Patr.-Bibl., Σάβα 283	Jerusalem	Israel
404		14th century	Sir.	Patr.-Bibl., Σάβα 418	Jerusalem	Israel
405		13th century	Dan.	Patr.-Bibl., Σάβα 697	Jerusalem	Israel
406		8th century	Cat. in Job	Patr.-Bibl., Σταυροὒ 36	Jerusalem	Israel
407		9th century	Oct., XII + IV proph.	Patr.-Bibl., Τάφου 2	Jerusalem	Israel
408		12th/13th century	Cat. in Gen.	Patr.-Bibl., Τάφου 3	Jerusalem	Israel
409		13th century	Cat. in Job.	Patr.-Bibl., Τάφου 5	Jerusalem	Israel
410		13th century	XII + IV proph.	Patr.-Bibl., Τάφου 36; RBN Gr. 261	Jerusalem; Petersburg	Israel; Russia
411		16th century	Eccl., Cant., Wis., Prov. fragm.	Patr.-Bibl., Τάφου 370	Jerusalem	Israel
412 =344		12th century	see item 344	Patr.-Bibl., Τάφου 510 β	Jerusalem	Israel
413		12th century	Cat. in Oct.	Bibl. des Serail, 8	Istanbul	Turkey
414		14th century	Cat. in Oct.	Bibl. Uniw., Voss. graec. in fol. 13	Leiden	Netherlands
415		15th/16th century	Cat. in Cant. (two types), Cat. in Eccl.	Bibl. Uniw., Vulc. 50	Leiden	Netherlands
416		14th century	Exod-Deut.	Uniw.-Bibl., Gr. 16, Bl 150-253	Leipzig	Germany
417		1103	Cat. in Lev.-Ruth	Archiepisc. Libr., 1214	London	U. Kingdom
418		11th century	Reg. IV fragm.	SUB, Theol. 11	Göttingen	Germany
419		1592	Cat. in Gen and Reg. I-II Par.	Griech. Part.-Bibl., 228	Alexandria	Egypt
420		1437	IV + XII proph., Job	BL, Add. 21259	London	U. Kingdom
421		1438	Sir. excerpta	BL, Add. 34060	London	U. Kingdom
422		12th century	Cat. in Oct.	BL, Add. 35123	London	U. Kingdom
423		15th century	Cant.	BL, Arund. 520	London	U. Kingdom
424		15th century	Cat. in Oct.	BL, Burn. 34	London	U. Kingdom
425		14th century	Prov., Eccl., Cant.	BL, Royal 1 A. XV	London	U. Kingdom
426		11th century	Oct.	BL, Add. 39585	London	U. Kingdom
427		15th century	Mac. IV	Bibl. pubbl., 1387	Lucca	Italy
428		16th century	Cat. in Is.	Bibl. Nac., 4776	Madrid	Spain
429		14th century	Sir. excerpta	Bibl. Nac., 4586	Madrid	Spain
430		1574	Cat. in IV proph.	Bibl. Nac., 4671	Madrid	Spain
431		16th century	Cat. in Gen.	Bibl. Nac., 4773	Madrid	Spain
432		10th century	XVI proph.	Χοζοβιωτίσσας 4	Amorgos	Greece
433		16th century	Cat. in Is.	Bibl. Nac., 4705	Madrid	Spain
434		16th? century	Cat. in Job	Bibl. Nac., 4716	Madrid	Spain
435		16th century	Cat. in IV proph.	Bibl. Nac., 4717	Madrid	Spain
436		1556	Cat. Procopii in Cant. and Prov., Cat. Polychronii in Eccl., Sap.	Bibl. Nac., 4749	Madrid	Spain
437		16th century	Cat. Procopii in Cant. and Prov., Cat. in Eccl., Sap.	Bibl. Nac., 4781	Madrid	Spain
438		16th century	Cat. in Is.	Bibl. Univ., 17	Salamanca	Spain
439		16th century	Cat. in Cant. (two types)	Bibl. Univ., 20	Salamanca	Spain
440		16th century	Cat. Polychronii in Prov.	Bibl. Univ., 26	Salamanca	Spain
441		11th century	Cat. in Is.	Bibl. Univ., 43	Salamanca	Spain
[442] burnt		15th/16th century	Jud., Ruth, Reg., Par., Prov., Eccl., Cant., Esdr., Est., Wis., Idt., Tob., Mac. I-III	Arch. Hist. Univ., E 1. no 10	Madrid	Spain
443		10th century	Prov., Eccl., Wis., Sir.	Biblioteca Ambrosiana, B. 68 sup.	Milan	Italy
444		13th century	Cat. in Job	Biblioteca Ambrosiana, B. 117 sup.	Milan	Italy
445		13th century	Jer. fragm.	Biblioteca Ambrosiana, C. 124 sup.	Milan	Italy
446		1073	Mac. IV	Biblioteca Ambrosiana, C. 186 inf.	Milan	Italy
447		1568	Cat. in Prov., Cat. Procopii in Cant.	Biblioteca Ambrosiana, C. 267 inf.	Milan	Italy
448		15th century	Mac. IV	70	Μηλέαι	Greece
449		10th/11th century	XII + IV proph.	Biblioteca Ambrosiana, D. 96 sup., A. 147 sup., H. 257 inf.	Milan	Italy
450		16th century	Cat. in Is. and Job fragm.	Biblioteca Ambrosiana, D. 473 inf.	Milan	Italy
451		12th century	Cat. in Nicol. Muzani in Is.	Biblioteca Ambrosiana, G. 79 sup.	Milan	Italy
452		14th century	Mac. IV, Est.	Biblioteca Ambrosiana, H. 11 sup.	Milan	Italy
453		15th century	Cat. in Is.	Biblioteca Ambrosiana, S. 12 sup.	Milan	Italy
454		16th century	Cat. in Job	Bibl. Naz. di Brera, AF. XIV. 13	Milan	Italy
455		12th century	Mac. IV	Bibl. Univ., Salv. 3	Messina	Italy
456		11th century	XVI proph.	Bibl. Univ., Salv. 7 andc. BL, Add 18212; Biblioteca Ambrosiana, D. 34 sup. Bodleian Library, Auct. T. inf. 2. 12., Bl 9 i 11	Messina; London; Milan; Oxford	Italy; U. Kingdom; Italy; U. Kingdom
457		12th century	Mac. IV	Bibl. Univ., Salv. 49	Messina	Italy
458		12th century	Oct.	Bibl. Univ., 62	Messina	Italy
459		13th century	Dan.	Bibl. Univ., 63	Messina	Italy
460		13th century	Reg.	Bibl. Univ., 101	Messina	Italy
461		16th century	Oct., Reg., XII proph., Is.–Ez.	Μ. Μεταμορφώσεως, 216	Meteora	Greece
462		1505	Wis., Prov., Eccl., Job, Sir., Cant.	Bibl. Estense, Gr. 64	Modena	Italy
463		16th century	Cat. in Cant.	Bibl. Estense, Gr. 154	Modena	Italy
464		1550	Cat. Procopii in Cant. and Prov., Cat. in Eccl., Sap.	Bibl. Estense, Gr. 155	Modena	Italy
465		1560	Cat. in Cant.	Bibl. Estense, Gr. 171	Modena	Italy
466		15th/16th century	Sus.	École de médecine, 405	Montpellier	France
467		1063	Mac. IV	State Historical Museum, Syn. gr. 9	Moscow	Russia
468		16th century	Cat in Is.	State Historical Museum, Syn. gr. 24	Moscow	Russia
469		11th century	Cat. Nicol. Muzani in Is.	State Historical Museum, Syn. gr. 25	Moscow	Russia
470		10th century	Dan.	State Historical Museum, Syn. gr. 124	Moscow	Russia
471		13th/14th century	Cat. in Job and Prov, Eccl., Cant., Wis., Ps. Sal., Sir.	State Historical Museum, Syn. gr. 147	Moscow	Russia
472		11th century	Mac. IV	State Historical Museum, Syn. gr. 160	Moscow	Russia
473		11th century	Mac. IV	State Historical Museum, Syn. gr. 173	Moscow	Russia
474		10th century	Cat. in Job	State Historical Museum, Syn. gr. 342 i 412	Moscow	Russia
475		13th/14th century	Cat. in Prov. and Eccl.	State Historical Museum, Syn. gr. 355	Moscow	Russia
476		12th century	Cat. in Prov. and Job	State Historical Museum, Syn. gr. 392	Moscow	Russia
477		13th century	Cat. in Is.	Вατοπαιδίου, 661	Mount Athos	Greece
478		15th century	Prov., Wis., Sir.	State Historical Museum, Syn. gr. 471	Moscow	Russia
479		16th century	Cat. Nicol. Muzani in Is.	BSB, gr. 14	Munich	Germany
480		16th century	Cat. in Prov. and Job	BSB, gr. 32	Munich	Germany
481		16th century	Cat. in Is. and Prov.	BSB, gr. 38	Munich	Germany
482		16th century	Cat. in Cant.	BSB, gr. 64	Munich	Germany
483		16th century	Cat. in Gen. and. Exod.	BSB, gr. 82	Munich	Germany
484		16th century	Cat. in Cant.	BSB, gr. 84	Munich	Germany
485		1549	Cat. Procopii. in Cant. and Prov., Cat. in Eccl., Sap.	BSB, gr. 131	Munich	Germany
486		16th century	Cat. in Eccl. and Cant.	BSB, gr. 292 i 294	Munich	Germany
487		15th century	Cat. Procopii in Cant.	BSB, gr. 369	Munich	Germany
488		11th century	Jos–Ruth, Reg., Tob.	BSB, gr. 372	Munich	Germany
489		10th century	Jos–Ruth, Reg., Par.	BSB, gr. 454	Munich	Germany
490		11th century	XII + IV proph.	BSB, gr. 472	Munich	Germany
491		13th century	Mac. IV	BSB, gr. 488	Munich	Germany
492		16th century	Cat. in Job	BSB, gr. 491	Munich	Germany
493		15th century	Sir.	BSB, gr. 551	Munich	Germany
494		16th century	Cat. in Cant.	BSB, gr. 559	Munich	Germany
495		16th century	Cat. in Prov.	BSB, gr. 561	Munich	Germany
496		15th/16th century	Cat. Nicandae in Job	Bibl. Naz., II. B. 26	Naples	Italy
497		15th century	Cat. Nicandae in Job	Bibl. Naz., II. B. 27	Naples	Italy
498		1380	Mac. IV	Bibl. Naz., II. C. 25	Naples	Italy
499		15th century	Cat. in. Cant.	ÖNB, Suppl. gr. 201	Vienna	Austria
500		11th/12th century	Cat. in. Oct.	ÖNB, Suppl. gr. 176	Vienna	Austria

==== 501–600 ====
Symbol	Name	Date	Content	Institution	City	Country
501		15th century	XII + IV proph.	Stadtbibl., Solger. in fol. 14	Nuremberg	Germany
502		16th century	Cat. in Cant.	Bodleian Library, Auct. E. 2. 8	Oxford	U. Kingdom
503		12th/13th century	Cat. in Job and Prov. and Eccl. and Cant.	Bodleian Library, Auct. E. 2. 16	Oxford	U. Kingdom
504		16th century	Cat. in Cant. (two types) and Eccl., Cat. Polychronii in Prov.	Bodleian Library, Auct. E. 2. 17 i 18	Oxford	U. Kingdom
505		14th century	Cat. in Job	Bodleian Library, Auct. E. 2. 19	Oxford	U. Kingdom
506		16th century	Cat. in Cant.	Bodleian Library, Auct. T. 1. 22	Oxford	U. Kingdom
507		14th century	Sir. 51, Cant.	Bodleian Library, Auct. T. 2. 5	Oxford	U. Kingdom
508		c. 817	OT excerpta	Bodleian Library, Auct. F. 4. 32	Oxford	U. Kingdom
509		9th/10th century	Oct., Reg I-III	Bodleian Library, Auct. T. inf. 2. 1 Univ. Libr., Add. 1879. 7 BL, Add. 20002; RBN Gr. 62	Oxford; Cambridge; London; Petersburg	U. Kingdom; U. Kingdom; U. Kingdom; Russia
510		14th century	Reg. I-IV	Λαύρα, 762 (H 107)	Mount Athos	Greece
511		15th century	Dan.	Bodleian Library, Barocc. 148	Oxford	U. Kingdom
512		1562	Cat. Nicandae in Job	Bodleian Library, Barocc. 176	Oxford	U. Kingdom
513		16th century	Cat. in Job	Bodleian Library, Barocc. 178	Oxford	U. Kingdom
514		15th century	Cat. Nic. in Job, Cat. in Prov.	Bodleian Library, Barocc. 195	Oxford	U. Kingdom
515		12th/13th century	Cat. in Job	Bodleian Library, Barocc. 201	Oxford	U. Kingdom
516		12th century	Libri Sap.	Λαύρα, 149 (B 29)	Mount Athos	Greece
517		15th century	Cat. in Prov.	Bodleian Library, Barocc. 232	Oxford	U. Kingdom
518		16th century	Cat. Nicol. Muzani in Is.	Bodleian Library, Canonic. gr. 59	Oxford	U. Kingdom
519		15th century	Prov. + Lect.	Λαύρα, 301 (Γ 61)	Mount Athos	Greece
520		1406	Libri sap.	Λαύρα, 1571 (Λ 80)	Mount Athos	Greece
521		1579	Psellos comm. in Cant.	March, Cat. in Cant. and Eccl.	Madrid	Spain
522		13th century	Cat. in Eccl., + Cant.	Trinity Coll., B. 7. 3	Cambridge	U. Kingdom
523		13th century	Cat. in Job	Bodleian Library, Laud. gr. 20	Oxford	U. Kingdom
524		14th century	Mac. IV	Bodleian Library, Laud. gr. 41	Oxford	U. Kingdom
525		16th century	Cat. in Job	Bodleian Library, Laud. gr. 86	Oxford	U. Kingdom
526		16th century	Cat. in Is	New Coll., 41	Oxford	U. Kingdom
527		14th century	Oct., Reg., Par.	Bibl. de l'Arsenal, 8415	Paris	France
528		1264	Cat. in Lev.–Ruth	BnF, Coisl. Gr. 5	Paris	France
529		13th century	Cat. in Lev.–Ruth	BnF, Coisl. Gr. 6	Paris	France
530		12th/13th century	Cat. in Jos–Ruth	BnF, Coisl. Gr. 7	Paris	France
531		15th century	Cat. in Job	BnF, Coisl. Gr. 9	Paris	France
532		16th century	Cat. in Prov.	BnF, Coisl. Gr. 15	Paris	France
533		13th century	Cat. in Ez.	BnF, Coisl. Gr. 17	Paris	France
534		11th century	Idt., Mac. I-IV, IV + XII proph., Job, Prov., Cant., Eccl., Wis., Sir.	BnF, Coisl. Gr. 18	Paris	France
535		10th century	Tob.	BnF, Coisl. Gr. 83	Paris	France
536		12th century	Dan.	BnF, Coisl. Gr. 105	Paris	France
537		13th century	Oct.	BnF, Coisl. Gr. 184	Paris	France
538		12th century	XII + IV proph.	BnF, Coisl. Gr. 191	Paris	France
539		11th century	Catenarum (Prov. and Eccl. Gen. and Exod.) excerpta	BnF, Coisl. Gr. 193	Paris	France
540		13th century	Cat. in Prov. and Eccl. and Cant. and Job	BnF, Coisl. Gr. 194	Paris	France
541		12th century	Dan.	BnF, Coisl. Gr. 258	Paris	France
542		9th century	Tob., Prov., Job., Eccl., Cant., Wis., Sir., Sap. 1-47, Mac. I-IV, Est., Idt.	BnF, Gr. 10	Paris	France
543		1186	Job., Prov., Eccl., Cant., Sap., Sir.	BnF, Gr. 11	Paris	France
544		11th century	XII + IV proph.	BnF, Gr. 15	Paris	France
545		13th century	Job, Porv., Eccl., Cant. Wis., Sir.	BnF, Gr. 18	Paris	France
546		16th century	Job	BnF, Gr. 19	Paris	France
547		13th century	Prov., Eccl., Cant., Wis., Sir.	BnF, Gr. 35	Paris	France
548		14th/15th century	Prov., Sir., Eccl., Wis., Cant.	BnF, Gr. 36	Paris	France
549		11th century	Eccl., Wis., Cant., Prov.	BnF, Gr. 57	Paris	France
550		12th century	Cat. in Oct.	BnF, Gr. 128	Paris	France
551		13th century	Cat. in Gen.–Jg.	BnF, Gr. 129	Paris	France
552		16th century	Cat. in Oct.	BnF, Gr. 130 i 132	Paris	France
553		16th century	Cat. in Exod.	BnF, Gr. 131	Paris	France
554		14th century	Cat. in Reg. Par.	BnF, Gr. 133	Paris	France
555		13th century	Cat. in Job	BnF, Gr. 134	Paris	France
556		1362	Cat. in Job	BnF, Gr. 135	Paris	France
557		15th century	Cat. in Job	BnF, Gr. 136	Paris	France
558		16th century	Cat. in Job fragm.	BnF, Gr. 137	Paris	France
559		16th century	Cat. in Job	BnF, Gr. 138	Paris	France
560		13th century	Cat. in Prov. and Eccl. and Cant. and Job.	BnF, Gr. 151	Paris	France
561		13th century	Cat. in Eccl. and Cant.	BnF, Gr. 152	Paris	France
562		11th/12th century	Cat. Procopii in Cant. and Prov.	BnF, Gr. 153	Paris	France
563		12th century	Cat. Proc. Cant. & Prov., Cat in Eccl., Sap.	BnF, Gr. 154	Paris	France
564		10th century	Cat. in Is.	BnF, Gr. 155	Paris	France
565		10th century	Cat. in Is.	BnF, Gr. 156	Paris	France
566		12th century	Cat. in Is.	BnF, Gr. 157	Paris	France
567		12th century	Cat. in Jer.	BnF, Gr. 158	Paris	France
568		13th century	Cat. in XII + IV proph.	BnF, Gr. 159	Paris	France
569		13th century	Cat. in Gen.	BnF, Gr. 161	Paris	France
570		13th century	Cat. in Job	BnF, Gr. 162	Paris	France
571		16th century	Cat. Procopii in Cant. and Prov., Cat. in Eccl., Sap.	BnF, Gr. 172	Paris	France
572		16th century	Cat. in Cant. (two types)	BnF, Gr. 173	Paris	France
573		10th/11th century	Cat. in Prov. and Ez., and Dan. excerpta	BnF, Gr. 174	Paris	France
574		16th century	Cat. in Eccl.	BnF, Gr. 176	Paris	France
575		13th century	Ecloge XVI proph., Cant., Job, Sir. excerpta	BnF, Gr. 396	Paris	France
576		10th century	Mal.	BnF, Gr. 513	Paris	France
577		11th century	Mac. IV	BnF, Gr. 548	Paris	France
578		12th century	Sir.	BnF, Gr. 905	Paris	France
579		13th century	Sap. fragm.	BnF, Gr. 854	Paris	France
580		16th century	Cat. in Cant. (two types)	BnF, Gr. 948	Paris	France
581		1272	Cat. in Prov.	BnF, Gr. 999	Paris	France
582		14th century	Cat. in Pov.	BnF, Gr. 1002	Paris	France
583		14th century	Tob., Est., Idt.	BnF, Gr. 1087	Paris	France
584		11th century	Dan.	BnF, Gr. 1173	Paris	France
585		10th/11th century	Mac. IV	BnF, Gr. 1053	Paris	France
586		12th century	Mac. IV	BnF, Gr. 1176	Paris	France
587		11th century	Mac. IV	BnF, Gr. 1177	Paris	France
588		11th century	Dan.	BnF, Gr. 1179	Paris	France
589		13th/14th century	Cat. in Is.	YBR, 241	New Haven	United States
590		11th century	Dan.	BnF, Gr. 1463	Paris	France
591		11th century	Mac. IV	BnF, Gr. 1474	Paris	France
592		11th century	Mac. IV	BnF, Gr. 1475	Paris	France
593		11th century	Dan.	BnF, Gr. 1478	Paris	France
594		11th century	Mac. IV	BnF, Gr. 1516	Paris	France
595		12th century	Mac. IV	BnF, Gr. 1527	Paris	France
596		12th century	Mac. IV	BnF, Gr. 1528	Paris	France
597		12th century	Mac. IV	BnF, Gr. 1548	Paris	France
598		1493	Dan.	BnF, Gr. 1612	Paris	France
599		15th century	Dan. fragm.	BnF, Gr. 1625	Paris	France
600		8th/9th century	Prov., Cant., Sir. fragm.	BnF, Gr. 2466	Paris	France

==== 601–700 ====
Symbol	Name	Date	Content	Institution	City	Country
601		15th century	Eccl., Cant.	BnF, Gr. 2509	Paris	France
602		15th century	Deut., Lev. fragm., Prov., Cant., Eccl.	BnF, Gr. 2511	Paris	France
603		16th century	Sir. (XIII), Ps.Od.	BnF, Gr. 2747	Paris	France
604		10th/11th century	Job. fragm.	BnF, Gr. 2841	Paris	France
605		1477	Dan.	BnF, Gr. 2981	Paris	France
606		1419	Wis., Ps.Sal., Sir.	BnF, Gr. 2991 A	Paris	France
607		15th century	Mac. IV	BnF, Gr. 3010	Paris	France
608		12th century	Cat. Nicandae in Job	BnF, Suppl. gr. 153	Paris	France
609		16th century	Eccl., Cant.	BnF, Suppl. gr. 500	Paris	France
610		14th century	Oct., Reg., Par., Esdr., Mac. I-IV, Est., Idt., Tob.	BnF, Suppl. gr. 609	Paris	France
611		16th century	Ez. fragm.	BnF, Suppl. gr. 1254	Paris	France
612		7th/8th century	Cat. in Job	Ίωάννου τοὒ Θεολόγου, 171	Patmos	Greece
613		13th century	Ps.Od., Prov., Eccl., Cant., Wis., Sir., Job, XII + IV proph.	Ίωάννου τοὒ Θεολόγου, 209	Patmos	Greece
614		11th century	Cat. in Is	Ίωάννου τοὒ Θεολόγου, 214	Patmos	Greece
615		11th century	Cat. in Pent.	Ίωάννου τοὒ Θεολόγου, 216	Patmos	Greece
616		11th century	Cat. in Num.–Ruth	Ίωάννου τοὒ Θεολόγου, 217	Patmos	Greece
617		11th century	Mac. IV	Ίωάννου τοὒ Θεολόγου, 258	Patmos	Greece
618		13th century	Oct.	Ίωάννου τοὒ Θεολόγου, 410	Patmos	Greece
619		15th century	Pent.	Ίωάννου τοὒ Θεολόγου, 411	Patmos	Greece
620		13th century	Cat. in Job	Ίωάννου τοὒ Θεολόγου, 419	Patmos	Greece
621		16th century	Dan.	Ίωάννου τοὒ Θεολόγου, 672	Patmos	Greece
622		16th century	Cat. in Cant.	Bodleian Library, Holkham Gr. 35	Oxford	U. Kingdom
623		16th century	Cat. in Oct.	Vatican Library, Vat. gr. 1520	Vatican City	
624		5th/6th century	Num. (with gaps)	RBN Gr. 5	Petersburg	Russia
625		8th/11th century	Reg. II 22:38–23:10, Reg. III 13:4–23, 16:31–33, 17:1–17 (with gaps)	RBN Gr. 24	Petersburg	Russia
626		9th century	Sap. and Sir. fragm.	RBN Gr. 42	Petersburg	Russia
627		10th century	Reg. III frag.	RBN Gr. 63	Petersburg	Russia
628		13th century	Cat. in Oct.	RBN Gr. 124	Petersburg	Russia
629		13th century	Cat. in Ps.Od., Ps.Sal.	Bibl. Casanat., 1908	Rome	Italy
630		10th century	Oct.	RBN Gr. 673	Petersburg	Russia
631		14th century	Est., Idt., Mac. I-IV, Tob., IV + XII proph., Prov., Eccl., Cant., Job, Wis., Sir.	Nat.-Bibl., E. VI. f. 19	Prague	Czech Republic
632		16th century	Cat. in Prov. and Eccl. and Cant. and Job	Bibl. Angel., Gr 113	Rome	Italy
633		16th century	Cat. in Gen.	Bibl. Angel., Gr 114	Rome	Italy
634		16th century	Cat. in Prov.	Bibl. Casanat., 39, Bl. 159-206	Rome	Italy
635		16th century	Cat. in Prov.	Bibl. Casanat., 39, Bl. 207-274	Rome	Italy
636		16th century	Cat. Procopii in Cant., Cat. in Prov.	Bibl. Casanat., 203	Rome	Italy
637		11th century	Job, Prov., Eccl., Cant., Wis., Sir.	Bibl. Casanat., 241	Rome	Italy
638		12th century	Cat. in Is.	Vatican Library, Chis. R. V. 28	Vatican City	
639		12th century	Mac. IV.	Vatican Library, Chis. R. VII. 50	Vatican City	
640		11th century	Mac. IV	Bibl. Vallicell., Gr. 2	Rome	Italy
641		14th century	Mac. IV fragm.	Bibl. Vallicell., Gr. 8	Rome	Italy
642		12th century	Lev. fragm.	Bibl. Vallicell., Gr. 10	Rome	Italy
643		10th century	Cat. in Job	Bibl. Vallicell., Gr. 37	Rome	Italy
644		11th century	Job	Vatican Library, Barber. gr. 369	Vatican City	
645		13th century	Cat. in Eccl. and Cant.	Vatican Library, Barber. gr. 388	Vatican City	
646		12th century	Cat. in Oct.	Vatican Library, Barber. gr. 474	Vatican City	
647		12th/13th century	Sus.	Vatican Library, Barber. gr. 517	Vatican City	
648		16th century	Cat. in Is.	Vatican Library, Barber. gr. 536	Vatican City	
649		12th century	Dan.	Vatican Library, Barber. gr. 537	Vatican City	
650		1561	Cat. in Cant.	Vatican Library, Barber. gr. 567	Vatican City	
651		16th century	Cat. in Gen.	Vatican Library, Barber. gr. 569	Vatican City	
652		1543	Cat. in Is.	Vatican Library, Ottob. gr. 7	Vatican City	
653		16th century	Cat. in Job	Vatican Library, Ottob. gr. 9	Vatican City	
654		1553	Cat. in Job	Vatican Library, Ottob. gr. 24	Vatican City	
655		16th century	Ps.Sal.	Vatican Library, Ottob. gr. 60	Vatican City	
656		13th century	Mac. IV	Vatican Library, Ottob. gr. 87	Vatican City	
657		16th century	Cat. in Prov.	Vatican Library, Ottob. gr. 117	Vatican City	
658		16th century	Cat. in Prov. Eccl. Cant.	Vatican Library, Vat. gr. 1521	Vatican City	
659		16th century	Ps.Sal.	Vatican Library, Ottob. gr. 384	Vatican City	
660		16th century	Cat. in Os. and Joel	Vatican Library, Ottob. gr. 437	Vatican City	
661	Joshua Roll	9th/10th century	Jos excerpta	Vatican Library, Palat. gr. 431	Vatican City	
662		9th century	Pent. fragm.	Vatican Library, Pii. II. gr. 15	Vatican City	
663		12th century	Dan.	Μ. Βλατ., 51	Thessaloniki	Greece
664		14th century	Pent.	Vatican Library, Pii. II. gr. 20	Vatican City	
665		10th/11th century	Dan.	Vatican Library, Pii. II. gr. 22	Vatican City	
666		15th century	Cat. in Gen. fragm., Cat. in Cant.	Vatican Library, Regin. gr. 7	Vatican City	
667		10th century	XII proph. and Ez. fragm.	Vatican Library, Vat. gr. 316	Vatican City	
668		13th/14th century	Mac. IV	Vatican Library, Urbin. gr. 125	Vatican City	
669		14th century	Num.–Ruth, Tob.	Vatican Library, Vat. gr. 332	Vatican City	
670		14th century	Est., Idt., Tob., Dan.	Vatican Library, Vat. gr. 335	Vatican City	
671		15th century	Mac. I-III	Vatican Library, Vat. gr. 348	Vatican City	
672		14th century	Sir.	Vatican Library, Vat. gr. 432	Vatican City	
673		14th century	Sir.	Vatican Library, Vat. gr. 509	Vatican City	
674		16th century	Cat. in Dan.	Vatican Library, Vat. gr. 561	Vatican City	
675		16th century	Cat. in Cant.	Vatican Library, Vat. gr. 620	Vatican City	
676		16th century	Cat. in Cant.	Vatican Library, Vat. gr. 621	Vatican City	
677		11th century	Mac. IV	Vatican Library, Vat. gr. 679	Vatican City	
678		16th century	Cat. in Cant.	Vatican Library, Vat. gr. 728	Vatican City	
679		13th century	Sir.	Vatican Library, Vat. gr. 742	Vatican City	
680		10th century	Cat. in Job	Vatican Library, Vat. gr. 750	Vatican City	
681		13th century	Cat. in Job	Vatican Library, Vat. gr. 751	Vatican City	
682		11th/12th century	Mac. IV	Vatican Library, Vat. gr. 819	Vatican City	
683		11th century	Mac. IV	Vatican Library, Vat. gr. 823	Vatican City	
684		15th/16th century	Bel and Dr., Jer.	Vatican Library, Vat. gr. 1069	Vatican City	
685		15th/16th century	Mac. IV	Vatican Library, Vat. gr. 1147	Vatican City	
686		1542	Mac. IV	Vatican Library, Vat. gr. 1190	Vatican City	
687		12th century	Cat. in Job	Vatican Library, Vat. gr. 1231	Vatican City	
688		16th century	Cat. in Cant.	Vatican Library, Vat. gr. 1442	Vatican City	
689		11th/12th century	Dan.	Vatican Library, Vat. gr. 1652	Vatican City	
690		10th century	Mac. IV	Vatican Library, Vat. gr. 1671	Vatican City	
691		16th century	Cat. in Gen.	Vatican Library, Vat. gr. 1684	Vatican City	
692		16th century	Cat. in Prov.	Vatican Library, Vat. gr. 1770	Vatican City	
693		12th century	Dan.	Vatican Library, Vat. gr. 1843	Vatican City	
694		12th century	Sir.	Vatican Library, Vat. gr. 1871	Vatican City	
695		14th century	Mac. IV	Vatican Library, Vat. gr. 1882, Bl. 89-92	Vatican City	
696		14th century	Bel and Dr.	Vatican Library, Vat. gr. 1887	Vatican City	
697		16th century	Cat. in Job	Vatican Library, Vat. gr. 1909	Vatican City	
698		10th/11th century	Eccl., Cant.	Vatican Library, Vat. gr. 1974	Vatican City	
699		11th century	Mac. IV	Vatican Library, Vat. gr. 2043	Vatican City	
700		10th/11th century	Reg. II and IV fragm.	Vatican Library, Vat. gr. 2115	Vatican City	

==== 701–800 ====
Symbol	Name	Date	Content	Institution	City	Country
701		15th century	Cat. in Cant.	Vatican Library, Vat. gr. 2129	Vatican City	
702		10th century	Cat. in Exod.–Num.	Vatican Library, Vat. gr. 2131	Vatican City	
703		13th century	Cat. in Job	Vatican Library, Vat. gr. 2227	Vatican City	
704		16th century	Cat. in Cant.	Bibl. Univ., M 75	Salamanca	Spain
705		13th/14th century	Cat. in Job, Sir., Wis., Cat. in Prov., Eccl., Cat. in Cant. fragm., Cant. fragm.	EBE, 2410	Athens	Greece
706	Codex Atheniensis; (or, Codex Athens)	914	Job, Prov., Eccl., Cant., Sir., Sap.	EBE, 2641	Athens	Greece
707		10th/11th century	Oct., Reg.	Cod. gr. 1; RBN, Gr. 260	Sinai; Petersburg	Egypt; Russia
708		12th century	Cat. in Gen.–Lev.	Cod. gr. 2	Sinai	Egypt
709		13th century	Cat. in Job	Cod. gr. 4	Sinai	Egypt
710		10th century	XII proph., Is.–Ez.	Cod. gr. 5	Sinai	Egypt
711		11th century	XII proph.	Cod. gr. 6	Sinai	Egypt
712		1571	Cat. Procopii in Cant.	Cod. gr. 312	Sinai	Egypt
713		11th/12th century	Mac. IV	Cod. gr. 516	Sinai	Egypt
714		12th century	Mac. IV	Cod. gr. 517	Sinai	Egypt
715		13th/14th century	Cat. in Is.	Bibl. Comm., Cod. 1141	Treviso	Italy
[716] burnt		12th century	Cat. in Oct.	Εύαγγελ. Σχολή, A-1	İzmir	Turkey
[717] burnt		15th century	Cat. Nicandae in Job	Εύαγγελ. Σχολή, A-31	İzmir	Turkey
{718} removed		18th century	Sir.	Mus. Ben., TA 201	Athens	Greece
719		9th/10th century	XII proph.	Bibl. Naz., B. I. 2	Turin	Italy
720		1583	Cat. Polychronii in Eccl. and Cant.	Bibl. Naz., B. II. 8	Turin	Italy
721		16th century	Cat. in Cant.	Bibl. Naz., B. II. 16	Turin	Italy
722		11th century	Mac. IV	Bibl. Naz., B. II. 24	Turin	Italy
723		16th century	Cat. in Oct.	Bibl. Naz., B. III. 15	Turin	Italy
724		11th century	Mac. IV	Bibl. Naz., B. IV. 8	Turin	Italy
725		1562	Cat. in Job	Bibl. Naz., C. III. 1	Turin	Italy
726		12th century	Mac. IV	Bibl. Naz., C. IV. 19	Turin	Italy
727		16th century	Cat. Procopii in Cant.	Bibl. Naz., C. VI. 28	Turin	Italy
728		14th/15th century	Par., Esdr., Est., Tob., Idt., Mac. I-IV, Job, Prov., Eccl., Cant., Wis., Sir., (XI/XII), Cat. in Ps.	Bibl. Marc., Append I 13	Venice	Italy
[729] removed			Does not contain the biblical text	Bibl. Marc., earlier Gr. 16 (renaming)	Venice	Italy
730		10th century	Cat. in Oct.	Bibl. Marc., Gr. 15	Venice	Italy
731		14th century	Cat. in Reg., Par., Esdr., Est., Tob., Idt., Mac. I-IV	Bibl. Marc., Gr. 16	Venice	Italy
732		10th/11th century	Cat. in Prov. and Eccl. and Cant. and Job.	Bibl. Marc., Gr. 21	Venice	Italy
733		12th century	Cat. in Prov. and Eccl. and Cant.	Bibl. Marc., Gr. 22	Venice	Italy
734		10th/11th century	Cat. in Cant. and Prov.	Bibl. Marc., Gr. 23	Venice	Italy
735		8th/9th century	Prov. 23,21-30(24),12(35) fragm.	Bibl. Marc., Gr. 23 (renumbering)	Venice	Italy
736		12th/13th century	Cat. in Is.	Bibl. Marc., Gr. 25	Venice	Italy
737		13th century	Cat. in Is.	Bibl. Marc., Gr. 87	Venice	Italy
738		10th/11th century	Mac. IV	Bibl. Marc., Gr. 360	Venice	Italy
739		10th century	Cat. in Oct.	Bibl. Marc., Gr. 534	Venice	Italy
740		905	Cat. in Job.	Bibl. Marc., Gr. 538	Venice	Italy
741		11th/12th century	Mac. IV	ÖNB, Hist. gr. 45	Vienna	Austria
742		12th/13th century	Dan.	ÖNB, Hist. gr. 114	Vienna	Austria
743		15th/16th century	Sir.	ÖNB, Jurid. gr. 16	Vienna	Austria
744		16th century	Sir.	ÖNB, Philos. gr. 271	Vienna	Austria
745		12th/13th century	Esdr. I fragm.	Uniw.-Bibl., Gr. 16, Bl. 322-325	Leipzig	Germany
746		13th/14th century	Tob.	Uniw.-Bibl., Gr. 16, Bl. 326-327	Leipzig	Germany
747		10th/11th century	Mac. IV	Uniw.-Bibl., Gr. 37	Leipzig	Germany
748		13th/14th century	Cat. in Job	Byz. Mus., 2871; Univ.–Bibl. XXV B.3, Bl. „279” + „280”	Athens; Prague	Greece; Czech Republic
749		16th century	Cat. Nicandae in Job	ÖNB, Suppl. gr. 16	Vienna	Austria
750		15th/16th century	Cat. Nicandae in Job	ÖNB, Theol. gr. 73	Vienna	Austria
751		14th/15th century	Mac. IV	ÖNB, Theol. gr. 104	Vienna	Austria
752		15th century	Job, Prov., Cant., Cat. in Eccl.	ÖNB, Theol. gr. 115	Vienna	Austria
753		13th/14th century	Sir., Excerpta ex Prov. and Eccl. and Job	ÖNB, Theol. gr. 128	Vienna	Austria
754		11th century	Job, Prov., Eccl., Cant., Wis., Sir.	ÖNB, Theol. gr. 147	Vienna	Austria
755		16th century	Wis., Cant., Prov., Sir., Job	ÖNB, Theol. gr. 199	Vienna	Austria
756		15th/16th century	Cat. in Cant.	ÖNB, Theol. gr. 258	Vienna	Austria
757		14th century	Cat. in Cant.	ÖNB, Theol. gr. 314	Vienna	Austria
758		15th century	Cat. in Cant.	Vatican Library, Rossian. X. 6	Vatican City	
759		15th/16th century	Mac. IV	Vatican Library, Rossian. XI. 47	Vatican City	
760		1587	Cat. Procopii in Cant.	Virgen del Pilar, 1230	Zaragoza	Spain
761		13th century	Cat. in Oct.	Zentralbibl., C 11	Zurich	Switzerland
762		10th century	Reg., Par., Esdr., Est., Idt., Tob.	Вατοπαιδίου, 559	Mount Athos	Greece
763		11th century	XII + IV proph.	Вατοπαιδίου, 601	Mount Athos	Greece
764		13th/14th century	XII + IV proph.	Λαύρα, 169	Mount Athos	Greece
765		14th? century	Cat. in Job	Λαύρα, 220	Mount Athos	Greece
766		12th century	Prov., Wis., Eccl.	Λαύρα, 355	Mount Athos	Greece
767		13th/14th century	Lev.–Jos	Λαύρα, 603	Mount Athos	Greece
768		16th? century	Prov., Wis., Sip., Sus., Bel and Dr., Idt., Mac. IV	Λαύρα, 1085	Mount Athos	Greece
769		14th century	Od., Ps.Sal.	Λαύρα, 1485; Mus. Ben., Μπ 5 (4)	Mount Athos; Athens	Greece
770		12th century	XII proph. (with gaps), IV proph., Job, Prov., Eccl.	Λαύρα, 234 (B 114)	Mount Athos	Greece
771		10th century	inter alia Mac. I-IV	Вατοπαιδίου, 290 + 1213 Bl. 13-51; BnF, Suppl. gr. 682, Bl. 2-22; RBN, 346	Mount Athos; Paris; Petersburg	Greece; France; Russia
772		16th century	Mac. IV	Patr.-Bibl., Fonds Chalki III: Θεολ. Σχολή 40	Istanbul	Turkey
773		12th century	Mac. fragm.	Bodleian Library, Clark. Gr. 50	Oxford	U. Kingdom
774		13th century	Mac. IV fragm.	Vatican Library, Chis. Gr. 27 (R. V. 33)	Vatican City	
775		16th century	Mac. IV	EBE, 998	Athens	Greece
776		1042	Mac. IV	Ίβήρων, 16	Mount Athos	Greece
777		1551	Mac. IV	Κουτλουμουσίου, 206	Mount Athos	Greece
778		11th/12th century	Mac. IV	Λαύρα, 429 (Δ 53)	Mount Athos	Greece
779		12th century	Mac. IV	Λαύρα, 644 (Ε 182)	Mount Athos	Greece
780		11th century	Mac. IV	Mus. Ben., TA 141 (66)	Athens	Greece
781		12th century	Mac. IV	Griech. Part. Bibl., 35	Alexandria	Egypt
782		11th century	Mac. IV	Μ. Μεταμορφώσεως, 552	Meteora	Greece
783		13th century	Mac. IV	Ίωάννου τοὒ Θεολόγου, 256	Patmos	Greece
784		1481	Mac. IV	Bibl. Marc., II 168	Venice	Italy
785		13th/14th century	Sir. fragm.	Byz. Mus., 2801	Athens	Greece
786		14th century	Mac. IV	Griech. Nationalschule 62	Istanbul	Turkey
787		12th century	Mac. IV	EBE, 989	Athens	Greece
788		10th century	Libri sap.	Δημ. Βιβλ., 25	Tyrnavos	Greece
789		11th century	Mac. IV	Cod. gr. 520	Sinai	Egypt
790		11th century	Mac. IV	Λαύρα, 434 (Δ 58)	Mount Athos	Greece
791		14th century	Mac. IV	Φιλοθέου, 87	Mount Athos	Greece
792		13th century	Mac. IV	Σταυρονικήτα, 18	Mount Athos	Greece
793		16th century	Mac. IV	Ξηροποτάμοὒ, 236	Mount Athos	Greece
794		14th century	Mac. IV	Bibl. Marc., Appendix VII 32	Venice	Italy
795		12th/13th century	Job, Prov., Eccl., Cant., Sir.	Λαύρα, 291 (Γ 51)	Mount Athos	Greece
796		11th & 16th century	Cat. in Job	Griech. Part.-Bibl., 100	Alexandria	Egypt
797		13th/14th century	Job, Prov., Eccl., Cant., Wis., Sir.	Mus. Ben., TA 72 (53)	Athens	Greece
798		14th century	Cat. in Prov. and Eccl., Prov., Eccl., Comm. in Cant. / Sap. / Sir.	Coll., gr. 16	Rome	Italy
799		1280	Oct., Reg. I–IV	EBE, 2491	Athens	Greece
800		12th century	Mac. IV	AdW, gr. 17	Sofia	Bulgaria

=== Part IV: 801–1000 ===
==== 801–900 ====
Symbol	Name	Date	Content	Institution	City	Country
801	4Q119 (4Q LXXLev^{a})	1st century BCE	fragments of Leviticus 26:2–16	Rockefeller Museum, Gr. 1004 [4Q119]	Jerusalem	Israel
802	4Q120 (4Q LXXLev^{b})	1st century BCE	fragments of Leviticus 1:11, 2:3–6:5	Rockefeller Museum, 4Q120	Jerusalem	Israel
803	4Q121 (4Q LXXNum)	1st century BCE	fragments of Numbers 3:39–4:16	Rockefeller Museum, Gr. 265 [4Q121]	Jerusalem	Israel
804	7Q2 (7QLXXEpJer)	1st century BCE	fragments of Baruch 6:43–44	Rockefeller Museum, Gr. 789 [7Q2]	Jerusalem	Israel
805	7Q1 (7Q LXXEx)	1st century BCE	fragments of Exodus 28:4–7	Rockefeller Museum, Gr. 789 [7Q1]	Jerusalem	Israel
806		5th century	Gen. 27:43–28:6 fragm.	ÖNB, P. Vindob. G 26101	Vienna	Austria
807		5th century	Gen. 43:16–17, 20–21 fragm.	ÖNB, P. Vindob. G 26112	Vienna	Austria
808		5th century	Exod. 16:32, 17:1–2 fragm.	ÖNB, P. Vindob. G 39210	Vienna	Austria
809		6th century	Lev. 8:14–15, 17–19 fragm.	ÖNB, P. Vindob. G 19893	Vienna	Austria
810		5th/6th century	Prov. 26:11, 16–18 fragm.	ÖNB, P. Vindob. G 3077	Vienna	Austria
811		5th century	Prov. 27:10–11, 15–16 fragm.	ÖNB, P. Vindob. G 39209	Vienna	Austria
812		5th/6th century	Prov. 30:32–31:1, 3–6 fragm.	ÖNB, P. Vindob. G 30135	Vienna	Austria
813		5th century	Dan. o' 3:23–25 fragm.	ÖNB, P. Vindob. G 29255	Vienna	Austria
814	The Yale Genesis fragment	Between 1st. and 3rd. centuries.	Gen. 14:5–8, 12–15 fragm.	YBR, P. CtYBR Inv. 419	New Haven	United States
815		4th/5th century	Gen. 41:48–57 fragm.	Univ.-Bibl., P. Erl. Inv. 2	Erlangen	Germany
816	P.Schøyen 2648	2nd century	Jos 9:27–11:3 (with gaps)	Schøyen Coll., MS 2648	Oslo	Norway
817		4th century	Jer. 17:26–27, 18:8–11, 46:14–47:1, 7–9 fragm.	University of Paris, Inv. 2250	Paris	France
818		3rd century	Eccl.3:17f, 21f, 6:3–5, 8–11 fragm.	UML, P. Mich. Inv. 27; Univ. S. Cuore, P. Med. Inv. 151	Ann Arbor; Milan	United States; Italy
819	4Q122 (4Q LXXDeut)	2nd century BCE	fragments of Deut 11:4	Rockefeller Museum, Gr. 265 [4Q122]	Jerusalem	Israel
[820] missing		9th? century	Gen. 10:12–13	Om.-Mosch., Treu Nr. I	Damascus	Syria
[821] missing		5th/6th century	Reg. III 18:26–22:10 (with gaps)	Om.-Mosch., Treu Nr. II	Damascus	Syria
[822] missing		5th/6th century	Est. 8:10-E4	Om.-Mosch., Treu Nr. III	Damascus	Syria
[823] missing		5th/6th? century	Idt. 2:19	Om.-Mosch., Treu Nr. IV	Damascus	Syria
[824] missing		5th century	Prov. 4:26–5:8, 6:8a–16	Om.-Mosch., Treu Nr. VI	Damascus	Syria
[825] missing		4th/5th century	Cant. 2:1–6, 2:17–3:2, 5:8–13	Om.-Mosch., Treu Nr. VII	Damascus	Syria
[826] missing		5th/6th century	Sap. 10:19–11:11	Om.-Mosch., Treu Nr. VIII	Damascus	Syria
[827] missing		6th? century	Jer. 25:10–12	Om.-Mosch., Treu Nr. IX	Damascus	Syria
828		3rd/4th century	Sir. 29:15–18, 25–27 fragm.	Int. Pap., "G. Vitelli", Inv. 531	Florence	Italy
829		3rd century	Excerpta Os. 2:10–9:6, Am. 2:8–10, 15	BL, P. Inv. Nr. 10825	London	U. Kingdom
830		2nd century	Lev. 10:15–13:6, 23:20–30, 25:30–40 (with gaps)	Schøyen Coll., MS 2649	Oslo	Norway
831		c. 500	Gen. 36:14–15, 24–25 fragm.	Ägyptisches Museum, P. 17035	Berlin	Germany
832		4th century	Gen. 13:7–8, 10–11 fragm.	UML, P. Mich. Inv. 2724	Ann Arbor	United States
833		8th/9th century	Gen. 10:20–13:3, Num. 3:43–4:7	Bibl. Univ., S. Salv. 140+126	Messina	Italy
834		5th/6th century	Job 31:32–34, 31:39–32:1 fragm.	Ägyptisches Museum, P. 6788	Berlin	Germany
835		4th century	Exod. 5:14–17, 6:22–25, 7:15–17 fragm.	Ägyptisches Museum, P. 11766 + 14046	Berlin	Germany
836		3rd/4th century	Exod. 34:35–35:8 fragm.	Ägyptisches Museum, P. 14039	Berlin	Germany
837	P. Berlin 17212	3rd century	Jeremiah 2:2–3, 8–9, 16–19, 24–26, 30–32, 37; 3:1, 6–7, 12–13, 18, 24–25	Ägyptisches Museum, P. 17212	Berlin	Germany
838		4th century	Cant. 5:13–6:4 fragm.	Ägyptisches Museum, P. 18196	Berlin	Germany
839		7th/8th century	Jos 4:3–11	Westm. Coll., Cod. Clim. Rescr., Bl. 5	Cambridge	U. Kingdom
{840} locked				Bibl. Univ., S. Salv. 126: s. 833	Messina	Italy
841		6th/7th? century	Esdr.I 2:10, 9:21–24 fragm.	MMA, Inv. 12.180.184	New York	United States
842		4th century	Reg. I 23:28–24:2, 6–8, 12–13, 18–20 fragm.	Coll. Univ., P. Feinberg 1	New York	United States
843		4th/5th century	Exod. 4:4–6	Bodleian Library, Gr. bibl. g. 2 (P)	Oxford	U. Kingdom
844		3rd century	Is. 23:4–7, 10–13	LoC, 4082 B	Washington, D.C.	United States
845		4th century	Reg. I 13:16–18, 20–21; 13:23–14:1, 3–4; 18:8–25	ÖNB, Suppl. Gr. 187; Laurentian Library, PL Inv. III/957	Vienna; Florence	Austria; Italy
846		4th/5th century	Reg. I 24:11–17; 24:20–25:20; 31:12– II 2:4 fragm.	YBR, MS 544	New Haven	United States
847	Papyrus Fouad 266	2nd/1st century BCE	Deuteronomy 10:22; 11:1, 10,11, 16; 31:26–19; 32:2,4; 33:14–19, 22–23, 26–27	Sociandé Royale de Papyrologie, Gr. P. 458	Cairo	Egypt
848	Papyrus Fouad 266	2nd/1st century BCE	Deuteronomy 17:14 to 33:29 (with gaps)	Sociandé Royale de Papyrologie, Gr. P. 458	Cairo	Egypt
849		7th/8th century	Job 7:8–11 fragm.	John Rylands Library, P. Ryl. Copt. 3	Manchester	U. Kingdom
850		3rd/4th century	Is. 48:6–18 fragm.	Gr.-Röm. Mus., P. Alex. Inv 203	Alexandria	Egypt
851		4th century	Jer. 5:10–6:10	Bibl. Publ. and Univ., P. Gen. gr. Inv. 252	Geneva	Switzerland
852		5th century	Is. 1:22–2:2 fragm.	IfA, P.Colon. Inv. 2420	Cologne	Germany
853		6th/7th century	Dan. 6:20	Bodleian Library, Gr. bibl. c. 2 (P)	Oxford	U. Kingdom
854		3rd century	Job 9:2, 12–13 fragm.	Chester Beatty Library, P. Ch. Beatty XVIII	Dublin	Ireland
855		6th century	Job 7:9–10:14 fragm.	ÖNB, P. Vindob. G 35767	Vienna	Austria
856		4th century	Sap. 4:17–5:1 fragm.	P.Oxy. 4444	Oxyrhynchus	
857	P. Oxyrhynchus 3522	1st century	Job 42:11–12	Sackler Library, P.Oxy.L 3522	Oxford	U. Kingdom
858		3rd century	Lev. 19:16–19, 31–33 fragm.	IfP, P. Heid. Inv. G 954	Heidelberg	Germany
859		4th century	Sap. 17:5–20 fragm.	IfA, P.Colon. Inv. 5849	Cologne	Germany
860		5th century	Reg. III 2:30–31, 35 fragm.	Univ.-Bibl., P. Amst. Inv. 45	Amsterdam	Netherlands
861		3rd/4th century	Sus., Dan. 1:1–20 fragm.	Bodmer Library, P. Bodm. XLV/XLVI	Cologny (Canton of Geneva)	Switzerland
{862} locked		3rd/4th century		Bodmer Library, P. Bodm. XLVI s:861	Cologny (Canton of Geneva)	Switzerland
863		4th/5th century	Sir. 29:13–26 fragm.	private collections of Fackelmann, P. A. Fackelmann 12	Vienna	Austria
864		4th/5th century	Sir. 26:1–2, 5–7; 27:29–28:2, 5–8 fragm.	Laurentian Library, PL Inv. III/424	Florence	Italy
865	P.Deissmann	3rd century	Exod. 4:2–6, 14–17 fragm.	private collections of Horsley	Bundoora	Australia
866		4th century	Exod. 4:16–7:21; 33:11–35:4 lukami)	Schøyen Coll., MS 187; Gal. F. Antonovich; NLH Nr. III	Oslo; Paris; ?	Norway; France; ?
867		7th century	Reg. I 4:6, 9, 13, 15–16 fragm.	Ägyptisches Museum, P. 21291	Berlin	Germany
868		6th/7th century	Reg. IV 20:5–6, 10–12 fragm.	Ägyptisches Museum, P. 21289	Berlin	Germany
869		3rd/4th century	Est. 4:4–5, 8–11 fragm.	Sem. Pap., P. Palau Rib. Inv. 163	Barcelona	Spain
870		4th/5th century	quotes of Eccl. 1–4, 7–8; Cant. 4; Sir. 48.50f fragm.	Sem. Pap., P. Palau Rib. Inv. 225r	Barcelona	Spain
871		4th/6th? century	Prov 7:3–13	UML, P. Mich. Inv. 768	Ann Arbor	United States
872		4th century	Jer. 41:3, 1–11; 42:9–10, 16–17	ÖNB, P. Vindob. G 19891	Vienna	Austria
873		5th century	Jer. 31:15–17, 22, 25–27	ÖNB, P. Vindob. G 26072	Vienna	Austria
874		6th century	Jer. 24:9–10; 25:16–17 fragm.	Int. Pap., "G. Vitelli" PSI Inv. 74	Florence	Italy
875		3rd century	Dan. o' 1:2–5, 6–10 fragm.	NLH Nr. II	?	
876		5th? century	Jg. 3:15, 20; 13:10, 11, 16; 16:6–8, 11–12, 21–23, 26 fragm.	PML, Pap. G. 198	New York	United States
877		5th century	Exod. 21:27–28, 36 fragm.	Laurentian Library, PL Inv. III/310B	Florence	Italy
878		3rd century	Tob. 12:6–11	Int. Pap., "G. Vitelli" PSI Inv. 2666	Florence	Italy
879		4th century	Gen. 34:21–22, 25 fragm.	Ägypt. Mus., S. R. 3805 (9)	Cairo	Egypt
880		7th century	Par. I 25:26–29; 26:30(?); II 4:6–8; 6:19–20; 29:3	P. Sinai Gr. 1 (= Π 1)	Sinai	Egypt
881		3rd century	Is. 33:7–8, 17–19; 40:13–14, 24–26 fragm.	ÖNB, P. Vindob. G 23164 + 17417	Vienna	Austria
[882] missing		5th? century	Sir. 1:25–2:11	NLH Nr. I	?	
883		5th/6th century	Gen. 37:3–4, 8–9 fragm.	Bibl. publ. and univ., P. Gen. gr. Inv. 99	Geneva	Switzerland
[884] destroyed		5th/6th century	Deut. 24:15–21; 25:3, 6–8; 27:4–8, 11–12, 21–26; 28:20, 24, 29, 32; 29:22–24 fragm.	Univ. Bibl., P. 19, Nr. 1–9, + P. 13 + P. 22 + P. 26	Gießen	Germany
885		5th/6th century	Exod. 9:1–2, 6–8, 10–11, 14 fragm.	Bodleian Library, Gr. bibl. f. 4 (P)	Oxford	U. Kingdom
886		5th century	Gen. 25:19–22; 26:3–4; Exod, 3:2–8, 12–13, 16–19 fragm.	BNU, Pap. Gr. 748; Univ., Inv. P. Lange 32 A	Strasbourg; Copenhagen	France; Denmark
887		4th century	Num. 6:22–23, 25–27, 24	Byz. Mus., ?	Thessaloniki	Greece
888		c. 700	Sap. 10:8–9, 17	Bibl. Univ., Khirband Mird PAM 21 a+b	Leuven	Austria
889		4th century	Sap. 4:12(?); 11:19; Sir 25:16; Ps 7:12	P.Oxy. 2073	Oxyrhynchus	
890		7th century	quotes from Prov. 10–14, 16, 18 and NT	UML, P. Mich. 3718	Ann Arbor	United States
891		4th/5th century	Gen. 27:30–28:10	Neue Slg., ΜΓ 76	Sinai	Egypt
892		7th century	Sir. 10 and 13 (with gaps)	Neue Slg., ΜΓ 77	Sinai	Egypt
893		8th century	Sir. 33:13; 34:1–37:5	Neue Slg., ΜΓ 107	Sinai	Egypt
894		5th/6th century	Gen. 36:11–12, 18–19 fragm.	IfP, P. Heid. Inv. G 5148	Heidelberg	Germany
895		5th century	Ps. 118:2; Thr. 3:27–31 / quotes of NT	UML, P. Mich. 1574	Ann Arbor	United States
896		3rd century	Exod. 22:27; 22:31–23:2, 14–16	Woodbr. Coll., OLCR, P. Inv. 54 c	Birmingham	U. Kingdom
897		4th century	Jer. 14:3–5, 7–9	private collections of	Cambridge	U. Kingdom

==== 901–1000 ====
Symbol	Name	Date	Content	Institution	City	Country
901		7th century	Gen. 5:10–13, 28–30 fragm.	Ägyptisches Museum, P. 6770	Berlin	Germany
902		4th century	Is. 36:16–20; 37:1–6 fragm.	Ägyptisches Museum, P. 6772	Berlin	Germany
903		3rd/4th century	Gen. 27:29–30, 37–39; 28:1–5 fragm.	Ägyptisches Museum, P. 9778	Berlin	Germany
904		4th century	Is. 49:16–18 fragm.	Ägyptisches Museum, P. 13422	Berlin	Germany
905	P. Oxyrhynchus 656	2nd/3rd century	fragments of Genesis 14:21–23, 15:5–9, 19:32–20:11, 24:28–47, 27:32, 33, 40–41	Bodleian Library, Ms. Gr. Bibl. d 5	Oxford	U. Kingdom
906	P. Oxyrhynchus 846	6th century	Amos 2:6–12	The University Museum, E 3074	Philadelphia	United States
907	P. Oxyrhynchus 1007	3rd century	Genesis 2:7–9, 16–19, 23 – 3:1, 6–8	BL, Inv. 2047	London	U. Kingdom
908		3rd century	Exod. 31:13–14; 32:7–8 fragm.	P.Oxy. 1074	Oxyrhynchus	
909	Papyrus 909	3rd/4th century	Exodus 40:26 the end of the chapter	BL, Inv. 2053v	London	U. Kingdom
910		6th century	Tob. 2:2–5:8	P.Oxy. 1076	Oxyrhynchus	
911	Berlin Genesis	3rd. century	Genesis 1:16–38:5 (with gaps)	Inst. Arch. UW, P.Berlin G 2a-17b, u 46-61	Warsaw	Poland
912	Papyrus 12	3rd century	Genesis 1:1–5 sec. o' and a'	Morgan Library & Museum, Pap. Gr. 3; P. Amherst 3b	New York	United States
913		6th/7th century	Job 1:15–22; 2:3; 5:24–6:9; 14:1–5, 12–14; 25:4–5; 26:5–8 fragm.	John Rylands Library, Gr. P. 2; BL, P. Inv. Nr. 1859 B; PML, Pap. G. 4, Pap. G. 201, Fragm. 4 and 8	Manchester; London; New York	U. Kingdom; U. Kingdom; United States
914		6th century	Exod. 19:1–2, 5–6 fragm.	PML, Pap. G. 191, Fragm. 1	New York	United States
915		6th century	Is. 58:11–14 fragm.	PML, Pap. G. 191, Fragm. 2	New York	United States
916		6th century	Deut. 32:3–6, 8–11 fragm.	PML, Pap. G. 192	New York	United States
917		6th century	Prov. 10:18–29 fragm.	PML, Pap. G. 193	New York	United States
918	Codex Dublinensis	6th century	Is. 30:2–31:7; 36:17–38:1	Trinity Coll., K. 3. 4	Dublin	Ireland
919		6th/7th century	Zach. 4–14; Mal. (with gaps)	IfP, P. Heid. Inv. G 600	Heidelberg	Germany
920		4th century	Deut. 2:37-3:1, 3–5, 8–10, 12–13 fragm.	John Rylands Library, P. Gr. 1	Manchester	U. Kingdom
921		4th/5th century	Bel and Dr. 20-41 fragm.	Bodleian Library, Gr. bibl. d. 2 (P)	Oxford	U. Kingdom
922		3rd/4th century	Ez. 5:12–6:3 fragm.	Bodleian Library, Gr. bibl. d. 4 (P)	Oxford	U. Kingdom
923		4th/5th century	Zach 12:10–11; 13:3–5.	Bodleian Library, Gr. bibl. e. 4 (P)	Oxford	U. Kingdom
924		7th/8th century	Cant. 1:6–9 fragm.	Bodleian Library, Gr. bibl. g. 1 (P)	Oxford	U. Kingdom
925		4th century	Dan. 1:17–18	BL, Or. 7594	London	U. Kingdom
926		7th/8th century	Is. 3:8–14; 5:2–14; 29:11–23; 44:26–28; 45:1–5	RBN Gr. 23	Petersburg	Russia
927		6th century	Ez. 4:9–5:12; 21:6–17; 28:25–29:19; 39:8–18; 40:13–25 (with gaps)	Vatican Library, Vat. gr. 2519, Bl. 25–32 + 35–38	Vatican City	
928		3rd century	Prov 5:2–10:18; 19:10–20:9 (with gaps); Sap. 11:19–22; 12:8–11; Sir. 45:14–14, 20–22 fragm.	Sackler Library, P. Ant. 8 + 210	Oxford	U. Kingdom
929		6th/7th century	Sir. prol.19–3:11 fragm.	Patr.-Bibl., Τάφου 2, Bl. 56 and 27	Jerusalem	Israel
930		7th? century	Mac. IV 8:5–6, 12–13, 15, 29; 9:28–32	RBN Gr. 225 (połączony)	Petersburg	Russia
931		4th century	Lev. 22:3–23:22	Haris Nr. 15	Sinai	Egypt
932		4th century	Jg. 20:22–26.28; Ruth 2:19–23; 3:1–7	Haris Nr. 2 and 3	Sinai	Egypt
933		7th century	Num. 32:29–30	Haris Nr. 1	Sinai	Egypt
934		4th/5th century	Reg. II 15:34–16:5 fragm.	BNU, Pap. Gr. 911 + 1027	Strasbourg	France
935		4th century	Gen. 37:35; 38:1, 5, 9 fragm.	BSB, gr. 610 Nr. 1	Munich	Germany
936		5th century	Lev. 1:14–15; 2:10–12 fragm.	BSB, gr. 610 Nr. 2	Munich	Germany
937		7th century	Jg. 5:8–12	BSB, gr. 610 Nr. 3	Munich	Germany
938		5th century	Sir. 42:17–19 fragm.	ÖNB, P. Vindob. G 26782	Vienna	Austria
939		6th/7th century	Gen. 40:3–4, 6–7; 41:8, 10–12, 39–41, 43–44 fragm.	Univ. Libr., Or. 1287; Ertzabtei. Vitr. 46	Cambridge; Beuron	U. Kingdom; Germany
940		8th century	Gen. 21:12–22:5; 24:15–44 fragm.	BnF, Gr. 1397.2, Bl. 9–10 + 14–15	Paris	France
941		7th century	Od. 1 (Exod. 15), 1–19 short; Od. 3 (Reg. I 2), 1	IfP, P. Heid. Inv. G 1362	Heidelberg	Germany
942	Papyrus Fouad 266	2nd/1st century BCE	Genesis 3:10–12; 4:5–7, 23; 7:17–20; 37:34–38:1; 38:10–12	Sociandé Royale de Papyrologie, Gr. P. 458	Cairo	Egypt
943	Se2grXII (LXX^{IEJ 12})	1st century	fragments of minor prophets	Rockefeller Museum, Gr. Se2grXII	Jerusalem	Israel
943a	8HevXII a (LXX^{VTS 10a})	1st century	fragments of minor prophets	Rockefeller Museum, 8HevXII a	Jerusalem	Israel
943b	8HevXII b (LXX^{VTS 10b})	1st century	Zechariah 8:18–9:7	Rockefeller Museum, 8HevXII b	Jerusalem	Israel
944		3rd century	Gen. 6:8–12 fragm.	P.Oxy. 1166	Oxyrhynchus	
945		4th century	Gen. 31:42–53 fragm.	P.Oxy. 1167	Oxyrhynchus	
946		4th century	Jos 4:23–24; 5:1 fragm.	P.Oxy. 1168	Oxyrhynchus	
947		4th century	Lev. 16:33–34 fragm.	P.Oxy. 1225	Oxyrhynchus	
948		3rd century	Is. 38:3–5, 13–16 fragm.	ÖNB, P. Vindob. G 2320	Vienna	Austria
949		4th/5th century	Gen. 38:23, 25, 28–29; 39:1; 40:1–3, 11–12 fragm.	ÖNB, P. Vindob. G 39769 a, b, c	Vienna	Austria
950		4th/5th century	Sap. 1:1–2, 6–8 fragm.	ÖNB, P. Vindob. G 39770	Vienna	Austria
951		5th century	Jer. 12:9–10, 14–16 fragm.	ÖNB, P. Vindob. G 39771	Vienna	Austria
952		3rd/4th century	Cant. 5:12–6:11	BL, P. Inv. Nr. 2486, Bl. 1; SBO, P. Monts./II Inv. 84	London; Montserrat	U. Kingdom;,
953		c. 300	Gen. 46:28–32; 47:3–5	BL, P. Inv. Nr. 2557	London	U. Kingdom
954		4th century	Lev. 12:15–16, 19–20, 24 fragm.	P.Oxy. 1351	Oxyrhynchus	
955		4th century	Job 1:19–2:1, 6–9b fragm.	Laurentian Library, PSI 1163	Florence	Italy
956		4th century	Jon. 1:10–4:1	Laurentian Library, PSI 1164; Ägyptisches Museum, P. 16354	Florence; Berlin	Italy; Germany
957	Papyrus Rylands 458	2nd century BCE	Deut 23:24(26)–24:3; 25:1–3; 26:12; 26:17–19; 28:31–33; 27:15; 28:2	John Rylands Library, Gr. P. 458	Manchester	U. Kingdom
958		4th century	Gen. 26:13–14; Deut. 28:8, 11; Par. II 1:12; Is. 42:3–4; 52:15–53:3, 6–7, 11–12; 66:18–19 fragm.	John Rylands Library, Gr. P. 460; Univ.-Bibl., P. Inv. 22a/b	Manchester; Oslo	U. Kingdom; Norway
959		4th/5th century	Gen. 13:3–6, 8–9 fragm.	Ägyptisches Museum, P. 16353	Berlin	Germany
[960] missing		5th/6th century	Exod. 23:10–13; 31:12–13 fragm.	Ägyptisches Museum, P. 13994	Berlin	Germany
961		4th century	Gen. 9:1–15:14; 17:7–44:22 fragm.	Chester Beatty Library, P. Ch. Beatty IV	Dublin	Ireland
962	Papyrus Chester Beatty V	3rd century	Gen. 8:13–9:2; 24:13–25:21; 30:20–35:16; 39:3–40:13; 41:9–46:33 fragm.	Chester Beatty Library, P. Ch. Beatty V	Dublin	Ireland
963	Papyrus Chester Beatty VI	2nd century	Num. 5:12–8:19; 13:4–6, 17–18; 25:5–36:13; Deut. 1:20–7:20; 9:26–12:17; 18:22–19:16; 27:6–32:14 with gaps	Chester Beatty Library, P. Ch. Beatty VI; UML, P. Mich. Inv. 5554	Dublin; Ann Arbor	Ireland; United States
964		4th century	Sir. 36:28–37:23; 46:6–11; 46:16–47:2 fragm.	Chester Beatty Library, P. Ch. Beatty XI	Dublin	Ireland
965		3rd century	Is. 8:18–19:13; 38:14–45:5; 54:1–60:22 with gaps	Chester Beatty Library, P. Ch. Beatty VII + P. Merton 2; Laurentian Library, PSI 1273	Dublin; Florence	Ireland; Italy
966	P. Chester Beatty VIII	2nd/3rd century	Jer. 4:30–5:1, 9–14, 23–24 fragm.	Chester Beatty Library	Dublin	Ireland
967	Papyrus 967	c. 200 CE	Ezechiel, Daniel (prehexaplaric version LXX), Ester with gaps	Chester Beatty Library, P. Ch. Beatty IX + X; IfA, P.Colon. theol. 3-40; CSIC, P.Matr. bibl. 1; SBO, P. Monts./II Inv. 42, 43; Univ. Libr., John H Scheide P. 3	Dublin; Cologne; Madrid; Montserrat; Princeton	Ireland; Germany; Spain;. United States
968		3rd century	Jg 1:10–19	Laurentian Library, PSI 127	Florence	Italy
[969] destroyed		6th/7th century	Prov. 31:2, 6–7; Eccl. 5:4, 2:17, 4:17–5:1, 3:11, 4:1–3	Laurentian Library, PSI 1297	Florence	Italy
970	P. Baden 56b	2nd century	Exod 8:3, 5–20; Deut. 28:36–39; 29:15–26, 28; 30:5–7 fragm.	IfP, P. Heid. Inv. G 8 + 1020a	Heidelberg	Germany
971		3rd century	Par. II 24:17–24	BL, P. Egerton 4	London	U. Kingdom
972		4th century	Exod. 29:21–24 fragm.	Univ. Statale, Pap. gr. 22	Milan	Italy
973		4th/5th century	Is. 21:3–22:1 fragm.	John Rylands Library, P. Gr. 459	Manchester	U. Kingdom
974		c. 220	Job. 33:23–24; 34:10–15 fragm.	Ägyptisches Museum, P. 11778v	Berlin	Germany
{975} locked			see item 956	Ägyptisches Museum, P. 16354	Berlin	Germany
976		7th century	Is. 25:4–9 fragm.	Ägyptisches Museum, P. 3603	Berlin	Germany
977		5th/6th century	Gen. 29:17–21 fragm.	Ägyptisches Museum, P. 16989	Berlin	Germany
978		4th century	Exod. 34:18–20	Ägyptisches Museum, P. 16990	Berlin	Germany
979		5th/6th century	Prov. 23:26–27, 31–32 fragm.	Ägyptisches Museum, P. 16991	Berlin	Germany
980		5th/6th century	Jer. 13:16–18, 22–25 fragm.	ÖNB, P. Vindob. G 26093	Vienna	Austria
981		6th century	Prov. 8:22–25 fragm.	ÖNB, P. Vindob. G 29245 + 29454 + 29830	Vienna	Austria
982		5th/6th century	Is. 6:3	ÖNB, P. Vindob. G 19887	Vienna	Austria
983		2nd/3rd century	Par. II 29:32–35; 30:2–5 fragm.	SBO, P. Monts./II Inv. 3	Montserrat	
984		4th century	Jer. 18:15–16, 19–20 fragm.	SBO, P. Monts./II Inv. 5	Montserrat	
985		6th/7th century	Is. 1:18–29 fragm.	Sackler Library, P. Ant. 52	Oxford	U. Kingdom
986		6th/7th century	Is. 28:30–31, 35–36, 58; 28:63–29:1; 30:2–4, 7–9; 31:39–41; 32:2–3 fragm.	Sackler Library, P. Ant. 53	Oxford	U. Kingdom
987		3rd century	Prov. 2:9–15; 3:13–17 fragm.	Sackler Library, P. Ant. 9	Oxford	U. Kingdom
988		4th century	Ez. 33:27–31; 34:1–5, 18–24, 26–30 fragm.	Sackler Library, P. Ant. 10	Oxford	U. Kingdom
{989} locked			see item 818	Univ. S. Cuore, P. Med. Inv. 151	Milan	Italy
990		3rd/4th century	Tob. 12:14–19 fragm.	P.Oxy. 1594	Oxyrhynchus	
991		6th century	Sir 1:1–9	P.Oxy. 1595	Oxyrhynchus	
992		5th/6th century	Eccl. 6:6–8 6:12–7:1 fragm.	P.Oxy. 2066	Oxyrhynchus	
993		IIIA	Exod. 20:10–22 fragm.	P.Oxy. 4442	Oxyrhynchus	
994	Papyrus 62	4th century	Daniel 3:50–54	Univ. Bibl., Inv. 1661	Oslo	Norway
995	P. Berlin 17213	3rd century	Genesis 19:11–13, 17–19	Ägyptisches Museum, P. 17213	Berlin	Germany
996		1st/2nd century	Est. E16–8:17; 9:2–3 fragm.	P.Oxy. 4443	Oxyrhynchus	
997		4th century	Gen. 41:48–51, 55–57 fragm.	Ägyptisches Museum, P. 18131	Berlin	Germany
998		c. 300	Acts Pauli / Eccl. (Greek), Cant., Thr. and Eccl. (Coptic)	SUB, P. bil. 1	Hamburg	Germany
999		3rd century	Idt. 15:2–7 fragm.	IFAO, Ostr. 215	Cairo	Egypt
1000		3rd century	Exod. 40:5–13, 19–25 fragm.	University of Paris, Inv. 2266	Paris	France

=== Part V: 1001–1400 ===
==== 1001–1100 ====
Symbol	Name	Date	Content	Institution	City	Country
1001		12th century	Ps.	Νικολάου, 39	Andros	Greece
1002		XII	Ps.	Byz. Mus., 2138	Athens	Greece
1003		10th century	Cat. in Od.	EBE, 1	Athens	Greece
1004		12th century	Ps.Od.	EBE, 3	Athens	Greece
1005		12th century	Ps.	EBE, 5	Athens	Greece
1006		12th century	Ps.Od.	EBE, 6	Athens	Greece
1007		10th/11th century	Ps.Od.	EBE, 7	Athens	Greece
1008		11th century	Ps.	EBE, 47; RBN, Gr. 264	Athens; Petersburg	Greece; Russia
1009		12th century	Ps.	Вατοπαιδίου, 760	Mount Athos	Greece
1010		c. 1087	Ps.	Вατοπαιδίου, 761; Walters Art Gall., 530b	Mount Athos; Baltimore	Greece; United States
1011		12th century	Ps.Od.	Вατοπαιδίου, 851	Mount Athos	Greece
1012		12th century	Ps.	Γρηγορίου, 157	Mount Athos	Greece
1013		1037	Ps.	Διονυσίου, 86	Mount Athos	Greece
1014		12th century	Ps.	Διονυσίου, 93	Mount Athos	Greece
1015		12th century	Ps.	Διονυσίου, 585	Mount Athos	Greece
1016		12th century	Ps.Od.	Διονυσίου, 640	Mount Athos	Greece
1017		12th century	Ps.	Δοχειαρείου, 57	Mount Athos	Greece
1018		12th century	Cat. in Ps.Od.	Ίβήρων, 17	Mount Athos	Greece
1019		12th century	Ps.	Ίβήρων, 22	Mount Athos	Greece
1020		11th century	Ps.	Ίβήρων, 70	Mount Athos	Greece
1021		11th century	Cat. in Ps.	Ίβήρων, 597	Mount Athos	Greece
1022		12th century	Ps.Od.	Bryn Mawr Coll. Libr., Gordan MS 9	Philadelphia	United States
1023		12th century	Ps.	Κουτλουμουσίου, 87	Mount Athos	Greece
1024		11th/12th century	Ps.Od.	Λαύρα, 13	Mount Athos	Greece
1025		1084	Ps.Od.	Λαύρα, 146	Mount Athos	Greece
1026		984	Cat. in Ps.Od.	Λαύρα, 446	Mount Athos	Greece
1027		12th century	Ps.Od.	Παντελεήμωνος, 19	Mount Athos	Greece
1028		1193	Ps.	Παντελεήμωνος, 20	Mount Athos	Greece
1029		12th century	Ps.	Παντελεήμωνος, 21	Mount Athos	Greece
1030		12th century	Ps.Od.	Παντελεήμωνος, 22	Mount Athos	Greece
1031		c. 1083	Ps.Od.	Research Libr., 3; Mus. Ben., Μπ. 66 (31); Mus. of Art, 50.154; Tretyakov Gallery, 2580	Dumbarton Oaks; Athens; Cleveland; Moscow	United States; Greece; United States; Russia
1032		9th and 13th century	Ps.Od.	Παντοκράτορος, 61; RBN, Gr. 265 ?	Mount Athos; Petersburg	Greece; Russia
1033		12th century	Ps.Od.	Σταυρονικήτα, 46	Mount Athos	Greece
1034		12th century	Ps.	Φιλοθέου, 49	Mount Athos	Greece
1035		12th century	Ps.	Φιλοθέου, 50	Mount Athos	Greece
1036		12th century	Ps.	Φιλοθέου, 54	Mount Athos	Greece
1037		909	Ps.Od.	Kgl. Bibl., A. I. 14	Bamberg	Germany
1038		11th century	Ps.Od.	JL, Ms. Berlin graec. oct. 8	Kraków	Poland
[1039] destroyed		12th century	Ps.Od.	Staatsbibl., Graec. qu. 58	Berlin	Germany
1040		9th century	Ps.Od.	Staatsbibl., Graec. Ham. 552	Berlin	Germany
[1041] destroyed		11th century	Ps.Od.	Univ., Christl.-archäol. Sammlg., Inv. 3807	Berlin	Germany
1042		11th century	Ps.Od.	Univ. Libr., Dd. IV. 49	Cambridge	U. Kingdom
1043		9th/10th century	Ps	Bibl. des Spitals, 9	Bernkastel-Kues	Germany
1044		9th/10th century	Ps	Bibl. des Spitals, 10	Bernkastel-Kues	Germany
1045		10th century	Cat. in Ps.	Βιβλ. τ. Άρχιεπισκοπής, 25	Leucosia	Cyprus
[1046] missing		8th/9th century	Ps. 77:20–31, 51–61	Om.-Mosch., Cod. Violand	Damascus	Syria
1047		11th century	Cat. in Ps.Od.	Real Bibl., Υ (griech.)-II–14	El Escorial	Spain
1048		12th century	Cat. in Ps.Od.	Real Bibl., Ψ-I-2	El Escorial	Spain
1049		11th century	Ps.Od.	Münsterpfarrei	Essen an der Ruhr	Germany
1050		11th century	Ps.Od.	Laurentian Library, Conv. soppr. 35	Florence	Italy
1051		10th century	Ps.Od.	Laurentian Library, Conv. soppr. 36	Florence	Italy
1052		11th century	Cat. in Od.	Laurentian Library, S. Marco 696	Florence	Italy
1053		9th/10th century	Ps.Od.	Stiftsbibl., 17	St. Gallen Cathedral	Switzerland
1054		9th/10th century	Ps. fragm.	Stiftsbibl., 1395	St. Gallen Cathedral	Switzerland
1055		11th century	Cat. in Ps.Od.	Bibl. Franz., 3	Genoa	Italy
1056		12th century	Ps.Od.	A. γ. IV	Grottaferrata	Italy
1057		12th century	Ps.	A. γ. V	Grottaferrata	Italy
1058		12th century	Ps.	A. γ. VIII	Grottaferrata	Italy
1059		10th century	Ps.	A. γ. IX	Grottaferrata	Italy
1060		12th century	Ps.	A. γ. XI	Grottaferrata	Italy
1061		12th century	Ps.	A. γ. XIII	Grottaferrata	Italy
1062		12th century	Ps.	BL, Add. 47674	London	U. Kingdom
1063		12th century	Ps.Od.	BnF, Suppl. gr. 1335	Paris	France
1064		?	Ps. fragm.	Patr.-Bibl., Σάβα 63	Jerusalem	Israel
1065		11th century	Ps.Od.	Patr.-Bibl., Σάβα 165	Jerusalem	Israel
1066		?	Ps. fragm.	Patr.-Bibl., Σάβα 208	Jerusalem	Israel
1067		12th century	Ps.Od.	Patr.-Bibl., Σάβα 609	Jerusalem	Israel
1068		12th century	Ps.	Patr.-Bibl., Σάβα 698	Jerusalem	Israel
1069		12th century	Ps.Od.	Patr.-Bibl., Σταυροὒ 88	Jerusalem	Israel
1070		9th century	Ps.	Patr.-Bibl., Σταυροὒ 96; RBN, Gr. 263	Jerusalem; Petersburg	Israel; Russia
1071		11th century	Ps.Od.	Patr.-Bibl., Σταυροὒ 107	Jerusalem	Israel
1072		11th century	Cat. in Ps.	Patr.-Bibl., Τάφου 45	Jerusalem	Israel
1073		12th century	Ps.	Patr.-Bibl., Τάφου 51	Jerusalem	Israel
1074		1054	Ps.Od.	Patr.-Bibl., Τάφου 53; RBN, Gr. 266	Jerusalem; Petersburg	Israel; Russia
1075		12th century	Ps.Od.	Patr.-Bibl., Τάφου 55	Jerusalem	Israel
1076		9th/10th century	Cat. in Ps.	Patr.-Bibl., Nέα Συλλ. Φωτίου 29	Jerusalem	Israel
1077		11th/12th century	Ps.Od.	Manuskript Bibl., des Doms, 8	Cologne	Germany
[1078] missing		10th century	Ps.Od.	Μονή Κοσινίτσης, 125	Drama	Greece
1079		10th century	Ps.Od.	Bibl. Uniw., Perizon. in qu. 1 A	Leiden	Netherlands
1080		12th century	Ps.	Bibl. Uniw., Perizon. in qu. 36	Leiden	Netherlands
1081		11th century	Cat. Nicandae in Ps.	Bibl. Uniw., Voss. graec in fol. 42	Leiden	Netherlands
1082		12th century	Ps.Od.	Griech. Part.-Bibl., 344	Alexandria	Egypt
1083		12th century	Ps.	Univ. Bibl., Graec. 3	Leipzig	Germany
1084		10th/11th century	Cat. in Ps.	Λειμώνος, 49	Lesbos	Greece
1085		10th/11th century	Ps.Od.	Λειμώνος, 65	Lesbos	Greece
1086		12th century	Ps.Od.	Stiftsbibl., Theol. 8	Linköping	Sweden
1087		11th century	Ps.Od.	BL, Add. 11836	London	U. Kingdom
1088		1066	Ps.Od.	BL, Add. 19352	London	U. Kingdom
1089		c. 1090	Ps.Od.	BL, Add. 36928	London	U. Kingdom
1090		10th/11th century	Ps.Od.	BL, Add. 39586	London	U. Kingdom
1091		12th century	Ps.Od.	BL, Add. 39587 + 39588	London	U. Kingdom
1092		12th century	Ps.	BL, Add. 39589	London	U. Kingdom
1093		12th century	Ps. 96 ... 115:4.6 (wersandy z 43 psalmów)	BL, Or. 5465	London	U. Kingdom
1094		12th century	Cat. Nicandae in Ps.	Bibl. Nac., 4582	Madrid	Spain
1095		12th century	Cat. in Ps.Od.	Biblioteca Ambrosiana, C 98 sup.	Milan	Italy
1096		9th/10th century	Cat. in Ps.Od.	Biblioteca Ambrosiana, M 47 sup.	Milan	Italy
1097		11th century	Ps.Od.	Biblioteca Ambrosiana, M 54 sup.	Milan	Italy
1098	Ambrosiano O 39 sup.	9th century (end)	fragments of Psalms of Hexapla	Biblioteca Ambrosiana, O 39 sup.	Milan	Italy
1099		11th century	Ps.Od.	John Rylands Library, Gr. 11	Manchester	U. Kingdom
1100		1116	Ps.Od.	Bibl. Univ., Salv. 117	Messina	Italy

==== 1101–1200 ====
Symbol	Name	Date	Content	Institution	City	Country
1101	Chludov Psalter	9th century	Psalter	State Historical Museum, MS. D.129	Moscow	Russia
1102		9th century	Ps. fragm.	R. Staats-Bibl., Norov 74	Moscow	Russia
1103		10th/11th century	Ps. Od.	R. Staats-Bibl., Norov 77	Moscow	Russia
1104		11th century	Cat. in Ps.Od.	State Historical Museum, Syn. gr. 194	Moscow	Russia
1105		10th century	Cat. in Od.	State Historical Museum, Syn. gr. 213	Moscow	Russia
1106		11th century	Ps.Od.	State Historical Museum, Syn. gr. 341	Moscow	Russia
1107		10th century	Ps.Od.	State Historical Museum, Syn. gr. 356	Moscow	Russia
1108		11th century	Cat. in Ps.Od.	State Historical Museum, Syn. gr. 358	Moscow	Russia
1109		12th century	Ps.Od.	State Historical Museum, Syn. gr. 407	Moscow	Russia
1110		10th century	Ps.Od.	State Historical Museum, Syn. gr. 251	Moscow	Russia
1111		11th century	Cat. in Ps.Od.	BSB, gr. 251	Munich	Germany
1112		11th century	Cat. in Ps.Od.	BSB, gr. 252	Munich	Germany
1113		11th century	Cat. in Ps.	BSB, gr. 359	Munich	Germany
1114		12th century	Cat. in Ps. fragm. and Cat. in Od.	BSB, gr. 478	Munich	Germany
1115		10th century	Ps.Od.	BSB, gr. 556	Munich	Germany
1116		10th century	Od.	Bodleian Library, Auct. D. 3. 17	Oxford	U. Kingdom
1117		11th century	Ps.Od.	Bodleian Library, Auct. D. inf. 2. 18	Oxford	U. Kingdom
1118		10th century	Ps.Od.	Bodleian Library, Auct. T. 4. 19	Oxford	U. Kingdom
1119		9th/10th century	Ps. 117:10–14; 131:10–12	BnF, Copt. 12919, Bl. 36; Vatican Library, Borgian. copt. 96	Paris; Vatican City	France;.
1120		1143	Tht. comm. in Ps., Od., Cat. in Od. fragm.	Bodleian Library, Barocc. 132	Oxford	U. Kingdom
1121		11th century	Cat. in Ps.	Bodleian Library, Barocc. 235	Oxford	U. Kingdom
1122		12th century	Cat. in Ps.Od.	Bodleian Library, Canonic. gr. 62	Oxford	U. Kingdom
1123		c. 1077	Ps.Od.	Bodleian Library, E. D. Clarke 15	Oxford	U. Kingdom
1124		12th century	Cat. in Od.	Bodleian Library, Laud. gr. 42	Oxford	U. Kingdom
1125		10th/11th century	Cat. in Ps.Od.	Bodleian Library, Roe 4	Oxford	U. Kingdom
1126		10th century	Ps. fragm.	Christ Church, 15	Oxford	U. Kingdom
1127		12th century	Ps.Od.	Lincoln Coll., Gr. 31	Oxford	U. Kingdom
1128		11th century	Ps.Od.	Bibl. Naz, I. A. 2	Palermo	Italy
1129		9th century	Ps.Od.	Bibl. de l'Arsenal, 8407	Paris	France
1130		11th century	Cat. in Od.	BnF, Coisl. 81	Paris	France
1131		11th century	Cat. in Od.	BnF, Coisl. 275	Paris	France
1132		12th century	Ps.	BnF, Coisl. 360	Paris	France
1133	Paris Psalter	10th century	Cat in Ps.Od.	BnF, Gr. 139	Paris	France
1134		10th century	Cat in Ps.Od.	BnF, Gr. 140	Paris	France
1135		11th century	Cat in Ps.Od.	BnF, Gr. 141	Paris	France
1136		11th century	Cat in Od.	BnF, Gr. 141 A	Paris	France
1137		12th century	Cat in Ps.Od.	BnF, Gr. 143	Paris	France
1138		10th century	Cat in Ps.Od.	BnF, Gr. 146	Paris	France
1139		11th century	Cat in Ps.Od.	BnF, Gr. 163	Paris	France
1140		1070	Cat in Ps.Od.	BnF, Gr. 164	Paris	France
1141		11th century	Cat in Od.	BnF, Gr. 843	Paris	France
1142		11th century	Cat in Od.	BnF, Gr. 844	Paris	France
1143		1105	Ps.Od.	BnF, Nouv. acq. lat. 2195	Paris	France
1144		12th century	Ps.	BnF, Suppl. gr. 100	Paris	France
1145		12th century	Ps.	BnF, Suppl. gr. 260	Paris	France
1146		c. 1026	Ps.Od.	BnF, Suppl. gr. 343	Paris	France
1147		11th century	Ps.Od.	BnF, Suppl. gr. 610	Paris	France
1148		10th century	Ps. fragm.	BnF, Suppl. gr. 1155	Paris	France
1149		10th/11th century	Cat. in Ps.Od.	BnF, Suppl. gr. 1157	Paris	France
1150		1131	Cat. in Od.	Bibiloteca Palatina, Fondo Palat. 16	Parma	Italy
1151		12th century	Ps.Od.	Ίωάννου τοὒ Θεολόγου, 269	Patmos	Greece
1152		10th century	Ps. fragm.	Cod. gr. 45; RBN, Gr. 77 + 92	Sinai; Petersburg	Egypt; Russia
{1153} locked			see item 1152	RBN, Gr. 92	Petersburg	Russia
1154		11th century	Ps.	RBN, Gr. 200	Petersburg	Russia
1155		10th century	Ps.	RBN, Gr. 214	Petersburg	Russia
1156		862	Ps.Od.	RBN, Gr. 216	Petersburg	Russia
1157		12th century	Ps.	RBN, Gr. 544	Petersburg	Russia
1158		12th century	Ps.Od.	RBN, Papad.-Keram. 19	Petersburg	Russia
1159		11th century	Ps.Od.	Vatican Library, Barber. gr. 285	Vatican City	
1160		11th century	Ps.	Vatican Library, Barber. gr. 299	Vatican City	
1161		11th century	Ps.	Vatican Library, Barber. gr. 312	Vatican City	
1162		12th century	Ps.Od.	Vatican Library, Barber. gr. 320	Vatican City	
1163		12th century	Ps. fragm.	Vatican Library, Barber. gr. 332	Vatican City	
1164		10th century	Cat. in Ps.Od.	Vatican Library, Barber. gr. 340	Vatican City	
1165		11th/12th century	Cat. in Od.	Vatican Library, Barber. gr. 453	Vatican City	
1166		12th century	Ps.Od.	Vatican Library, Palat. gr. 288	Vatican City	
1167		10th century	Ps.Od.	Vatican Library, Regin. gr. 13	Vatican City	
1168		11th century	Ps.	Vatican Library, Regin. gr. 188	Vatican City	
1169		9th/10th century	Ps.Od.	Vatican Library, Regin. lat. 1595	Vatican City	
1170		c. 1087	Cat. in Od.	Vatican Library, Vat. gr. 342	Vatican City	
1171		c. 1014	Cat. in Ps.Od.	Vatican Library, Vat. gr. 619	Vatican City	
1172		10th century	Cat. in Ps.Od.	Vatican Library, Vat. gr. 744	Vatican City	
1173		c. 1075	Cat. in Ps.Od.	Vatican Library, Vat. gr. 752	Vatican City	
1174		11th century	Cat. in Ps.	Vatican Library, Vat. gr. 753	Vatican City	
1175		10th century	Cat. in Ps.Od.	Vatican Library, Vat. gr. 754	Vatican City	
1176		12th century	Ps.Od.	Vatican Library, Vat. gr. 1071	Vatican City	
1177		10th/11th century	Cat. in Ps.Od.	Vatican Library, Vat. gr. 1422	Vatican City	
1178		10th century	Cat. in Ps.	Vatican Library, Vat. gr. 1789	Vatican City	
1179		12th century	Ps.	Vatican Library, Vat. gr. 1812	Vatican City	
1180		10th/11th century	Ps.Od.	Vatican Library, Vat. gr. 1964	Vatican City	
1181		11th century	Ps.Od.	Vatican Library, Vat. gr. 1966	Vatican City	
1182		12th century	Ps.Od.	Vatican Library, Vat. gr. 2161	Vatican City	
1183		12th century	Ps.	Vatican Library, Vat. gr. 2295	Vatican City	
1184		10th century	Cat. in Od.	Cod. gr. 21	Sinai	Egypt
1185		9th century	Ps.	Cod. gr. 28	Sinai	Egypt
1186		9th century	Ps.Od.	Cod. gr. 29	Sinai	Egypt
1187		9th century	Ps.Od.	Cod. gr. 30	Sinai	Egypt
1188		9th century	Ps.Od.	Cod. gr. 31	Sinai	Egypt
1189		9th/10th century	Ps.Od.	Cod. gr. 32	Sinai	Egypt
1190		8th/9th century	Ps.Od.	Cod. gr. 33 + Neue Slg., ΜΓ 33, 1. Lage; RBN, Gr. 262	Sinai; Petersburg	Egypt; Russia
1191		9th century	Ps.Od.	Cod. gr. 34	Sinai	Egypt
1192		9th/10th century	Ps.	Cod. gr. 35	Sinai	Egypt
1193		9th/10th century	Ps.Od.	Cod. gr. 36 + Neue Slg., ΜΓ 9	Sinai	Egypt
1194		9th/10th century	Ps.Od.	Cod. gr. 37 + Staatsbibl., graec. oct. 2; Bibl. RAdW, Cod. Nr. 3	Sinai; Berlin; Petersburg	Egypt; Germany; Russia
1195		12th century	Ps.Od.	Neue Slg., ΜΓ 7 + ΜΓ 51 + Cod. gr. 39	Sinai	Egypt
1196		11th century	Ps.Od.	Cod. gr. 41	Sinai	Egypt
1197		c. 1121	Ps.Od.	Cod. gr. 44; RBN, Gr. 268	Sinai; Petersburg	Egypt; Russia
1198		c. 1074	Ps.Od.	Cod. gr. 48; RBN, Gr. 267	Sinai; Petersburg	Egypt; Russia
1199		12th century	Ps.Od.	Cod. gr. 56	Sinai	Egypt
1200		12th century	Ps.Od.	Cod. gr. 57 + Neue Slg., Μ 31	Sinai	Egypt

==== 1201–1300 ====
Symbol	Name	Date	Content	Institution	City	Country
1201		11th century	Ps.Od.	Cod. gr. 59 + Neue Slg., ΜΓ 19; RBN, Gr. 837	Sinai; Petersburg	Egypt; Russia
1202		12th century	Ps.Od.	Cod. gr. 60	Sinai	Egypt
1203		12th century	Ps.Od.	Cod. gr. 65	Sinai	Egypt
1204		c. 1002?	Ps.Od.	Cod. gr. 68	Sinai	Egypt
1205		5th? century	Ps. fragm.	Alte Slg., Cod. gr. 237	Sinai	Egypt
1206		10th century	Ps.	Stadtbibl., 7	Trier	Germany
1207		1049	Cat. in Ps.Od.	Bibl. Naz., B. I. 22	Turin	Italy
1208		8th century	Cat. in Ps.Od. [fragm.]	Bibl. Naz., B. VII. 30	Turin	Italy
1209		10th century	Cat in Ps	Bibl. Naz., C. II. 6	Turin	Italy
1210		12th century	Ps.Od	Bibl. Mun., 14	Valenciennes	France
1211		12th century	Ps.Od.	Bibl. Marc., Append. I 12	Venice	Italy
1212		10th/11th century	Cat. in Ps.	Bibl. Marc., Append. I 30	Venice	Italy
1213		10th/11th century	Ps.Od.	Bibl. Marc., Append. I 49	Venice	Italy
1214		11th century	Ps.Od.	Bibl. Marc., Append. II 113	Venice	Italy
1215		10th/11th century	Cat. in Ps.Od.	Bibl. Marc., Gr. 17	Venice	Italy
1216		11th century	Cat. in Od.	Bibl. Marc., Gr. 19	Venice	Italy
1217		10th century	Ps. 11-23	BL, Add. 34602.2	London	U. Kingdom
1218		12th century	Cat. in Ps. Od.	Bibl. Capit., CXVIII	Verona	Italy
1219		4th/5th century	Ps.Od. (with gaps)	SIL Freer Gall., Inv. Nr. 06.273	Washington, D.C.	United States
1220		6th/7th? century	Ps. 3–68 (with gaps)	ÖNB, P. Vindob. K 9907-9971b	Vienna	Austria
1221		7th/8th century	Ps. 9:33–13:5; 21:4–15; 24:16–25:4; 32:21–33:9; 34:6–15	ÖNB, P. Vindob. G 39773 a–q	Vienna	Austria
1222		11th century	Ps.	Bibl. Naz., Naples ex Vindob. gr. 20	Naples	Italy
1223		12th century	Ps.	Bibl. Naz., Naples ex Vindob. gr. 21	Naples	Italy
1224		11th century	Cat. in Ps.Od.	ÖNB, Theol. gr. 297	Vienna	Austria
1225		9th/10th century	Ps.	Bischöfl. Klerikalsem., Membr. o. 1	Würzburg	Germany
1226		11th century	Ps.Od.	Vatican Library, Vat. gr. 1210	Vatican City	
1227		12th century	Ps.Od.	Corp. Christ. Coll., 480	Cambridge	U. Kingdom
1228		11th century	Ps.Od.	Kgl. Bibl., Ny Kgl. Saml., 8°, Nr. 5	Copenhagen	Denmark
1229		11th/12th century	Cat. in Od.	Patr.-Bibl., Τάφου 50	Jerusalem	Israel
[1233] missing		10th/11th century	Ps. 17:34-35; 88:20	John Rylands Library, P. Ryl. Copt. 32	Manchester	U. Kingdom
1234		10th/11th century	Ps. 83:8-9	John Rylands Library, P. Ryl. Copt. 33	Manchester	U. Kingdom
1235		10th/11th century	Ps. 67:3; 106:31m 32, 41–43	John Rylands Library, P. Ryl. Copt. 36v	Manchester	U. Kingdom
1236		10th/11th century	Ps. 78:1–3	John Rylands Library, P. Ryl. Copt. 29	Manchester	U. Kingdom
1237		10th/11th century	Ps. 103:24	John Rylands Library, P. Ryl. Copt. 30	Manchester	U. Kingdom
1238		10th/11th century	Ps. 98:1	John Rylands Library, P. Ryl. Copt. 31	Manchester	U. Kingdom
1239		10th/11th century	Ps. 75:12; 84:2; 28:1	John Rylands Library, P. Ryl. Copt. 58	Manchester	U. Kingdom
[1240] missing		9th/10th century	Ps. 143:7–13; 145:8–146:6; Od. 1:8–15; 2:32–39	Om.-Mosch., Treu Nr. V	Damascus	Syria
[1241] missing		10th/11th century	Ps. 13:6–15:9; 17:50–18:fin. 73:13–74:9; 77:6–25	Om.-Mosch., Treu Add. 1	Damascus	Syria
1243		9th/10th century	Ps. 98	IfP, P. Heid. Inv. G 558	Heidelberg	Germany
1244		10th? century	quotes of Ps. 15–133	Kopt. Mus., Inv. 3877	Cairo	Egypt
1245		10th/12th century	Ps. 8:6–7; 20:4–5	BL, Or. 6801	London	U. Kingdom
1246		c. 895	Ps. 11:8; 64:6; 118:148–149, 169–176; 133; 137:8	PML, MS 574	New York	United States
1247		10th/11th century	Ps. 148:1–4; 150; Od. 8:57–74	Bodleian Library, Ms. Clar. Press B.3, Nr. 17	Oxford	U. Kingdom
1248		10th century	Ps. 2:6–8; 102:19–22	BnF, Copt. 12919, Bl. 73; Vatican Library, Borg. copt. 97	Paris; Vatican City	France;.
1249		IXE	Od. 4:2–8, 14–16; 7:27–29, 31–40 fragm.	Biblioteca Ambrosiana, L. 120 sup., Bl. 125 andc.	Milan	Italy
1250		10th/11th century	Ps.Od. (quotes)	Nat.-Bibl., Gr. I 27	Prague	Czech Republic
1251		(XI) 1231	Cat. in Ps.Od.	EBE, 2988	Athens	Greece
1252		12th century	Ps.	Hist. Ges., 296	Athens	Greece
1253		11th century	Ps.Od.	MIAND – Βιβλ. Πεζάρου, 50	Athens	Greece
1254		11th century (however Parpulov XIII)	Ps.Od.	Mus. Ben., 9	Athens	Greece
1255		12th century (however Parpulov XIII)	Ps.Od.	Mus. Ben., 17	Athens	Greece
1256		?	XII – Ps.Od. X (P XI)	Mus. Ben., 33	Athens	Greece
1257		14th century	Cat. in Ps.Od.	Вατοπαιδίου, 660	Mount Athos	Greece
1258		?	Cat. in Ps.Od. (Verz.: Comm.; P. Cat)	Παντελεήμωνος, 33	Mount Athos	Greece
1259		12th century	Ps. 1–10	Вατοπαιδίου, 625	Mount Athos	Greece
1260		11th century	Ps.	Вατοπαιδίου, 1231	Mount Athos	Greece
1261		12th century	Ps.	Διονυσίου, 586 B, Bl. 2-6	Mount Athos	Greece
1262		11th century	Ps.Od.	Καυσοκαλυβ, Ms. 87	Mount Athos	Greece
1263		12th century (Richard XI)	Cat. in Ps.Od.	Κουτλουμουσίου, 36	Mount Athos	Greece
1264		10th century	Cat. in Ps.	Λαύρα, 89 (Α 89)	Mount Athos	Greece
1265		10th century	Ps.Od.	Λαύρα, 147 (Β 27)	Mount Athos	Greece
1266		11th/12th century	Cat. in Ps.	Λαύρα, 203 (Β 83)	Mount Athos	Greece
1267		11th century	Ps.Od.	Λαύρα, 421 (Δ 45)	Mount Athos	Greece
1268		12th century	Ps.Od.	Staatsarchiv., A 246. Nr. 20 I-III	Bamberg	Germany
1269		11th century	Ps.Od.	Univ.-Bibl., B. XI. 25	Basel	Switzerland
1270		X^{A}	Cat. in Ps.	Bibl. Acad. Rom. 931; Patr.-Bibl., Καμαρ. 9	Bucharest; Istanbul	Romania; Turkey
1271		1105	Ps.Od.	Houghton Libr., gr. 3	Cambridge (USA)	United States
1272		12th century	Ps.Od.	Phillipps 6565	Cheltenham	U. Kingdom
1273		12th century	Ps.Od.	Slg. Willoughby, s.n.	Chicago	United States
1274		XII (1232)	Ps.Od.	Duke Univ. Libr., Ms. Gr. 17	Durham	United States
1275		10th century	Ps.Od.	Μονή Όλυμπ., 30 + 128	Elassona	Greece
1276		X (P X/XI)	Ra. Comm / Parp. Cat. in Ps.Od.	A. γ. VI	Grottaferrata	Italy
1277		11th century	Ps.Od.	BL, Add. 40731	London	U. Kingdom
1278		11th/12th century	Ps.Od.	BL, Add. 40753	London	U. Kingdom
1279		11th century	Ps.	BL, Add. 61891, Bl. 43-44	London	U. Kingdom
1280		12th century	Ps.Od.	R. Staats-Bibl., Φ. 270 (Sevastianov) 2 (467)	Moscow	Russia
1281		12th century	Ps. fragm.	R. Staats-Bibl., Φ. 270 (Sevastianov) 72 (528) Nr. 5	Moscow	Russia
1282		?	Ps. fragm.	R. Staats-Bibl., Φ. 270 (Sevastianov) 73 (529) Nr. 1	Moscow	Russia
1283		c. 900	Cat. in Ps.Od.	YBR, 249	New Haven	United States
1284		12th century	Ps.Od.	MMA, 2001.730	New York	United States
1285		XIIA	Ps.Od.	Publ. Bibl., Spencer gr. 1	New York	United States
1286		11th century	Cat. in Ps.Od.	Antiqu. Baer, Cat. 750, Nr. 819, NLH Nr. I	?	
1287		11th century	Ps.Od.	private collections of B. S. Cron, Ms. 4, NLH Nr. III	London	U. Kingdom
1288		12th century	Ps. fragm.	Bibl. RAdW, RAIK 7	Petersburg	Russia
1289		11th/12th century	Ps.Od. fragm.	RAdW Inst. Or., C. 686	Petersburg	Russia
1290		12th century	Ps.Od.	RAdW Inst. Or., B No 1215	Petersburg	Russia
1291		9th century	Ps. fragm.	RBN, Gr. 216, Bl. 347f.	Petersburg	Russia
1292		12th century	Ps. fragm.	RBN, Gr. 229, Bl. 104-118	Petersburg	Russia
1293		12th century	Ps.Od.	gr. 663	Petersburg	Russia
1294		10th century	Ps. fragm.	gr. 768	Petersburg	Russia
1295		11th century	Ps.Od.	Free Libr., Lewis 189	Philadelphia	United States
1296		12th century	Ps.Od.	Art Mus., y 1930-20	Princeton	United States
1297		12th century	Ps.Gall. greco-latini;	Vatican Library, Vat. lat. 81 (= Fischer 263)	Vatican City	
1298		11th/12th century	Ps.	Kath.-Bibl., 105	Samos	Greece
1299		(11th/12th century) 1242	Ps.Od.	Cod. gr. 2054	Sinai	Egypt
1300		8th/9th century	Ps.Od.	Neue Slg., ΜΓ 16	Sinai	Egypt

==== 1301–1400 ====
Symbol	Name	Date	Content	Institution	City	Country
1301		7th century	Ps. fragm.	Neue Slg., ΜΓ 24	Sinai	Egypt
1302		9th century	Ps.Od.	Neue Slg., ΜΓ 33 partim	Sinai	Egypt
1303		8th/9th century	Ps.	Neue Slg., ΜΓ 39	Sinai	Egypt
1304		9th century	Ps.	Neue Slg., ΜΓ 96	Sinai	Egypt
1305		9th century	Ps.	Neue Slg., ΜΓ 98	Sinai	Egypt
1306		10th century	Ps.Od.	Neue Slg., ΜΓ 106	Sinai	Egypt
1307		11th/12th century	Ps.Od.	Neue Slg., Μ 2	Sinai	Egypt
1308		12th/13th century	Ps.	Neue Slg., Μ 6	Sinai	Egypt
1309		12th century	Ps.	Neue Slg., Μ 15	Sinai	Egypt
1310		12th century	Ps.	Neue Slg., Μ 26	Sinai	Egypt
1311		11th/12th century	Ps.	Neue Slg., Μ 36	Sinai	Egypt
1312		11th/12th century	Ps.Od.	Neue Slg., Μ 43	Sinai	Egypt
1313		11th/12th century	Ps.	Neue Slg., Μ 52	Sinai	Egypt
1314		11th/12th century	Ps.	Neue Slg., Μ 56	Sinai	Egypt
1315		11th/12th century	Od.	Neue Slg., Μ 108	Sinai	Egypt
1316		11th century	Ps.	Neue Slg., Μ 119	Sinai	Egypt
1317		12th century	Ps.Od.	Neue Slg., Μ 121	Sinai	Egypt
1318		12th/13th century	Ps.Od.	Neue Slg., Μ 132	Sinai	Egypt
1319		12th century	Ps.Od.	Neue Slg., Μ 147	Sinai	Egypt
1320		12th century	Ps.	Neue Slg., Μ 208	Sinai	Egypt
1321		12th/13th century	Ps.	Neue Slg., X 120	Sinai	Egypt
1322		12th/13th century	Ps.	Neue Slg., X 121	Sinai	Egypt
1323		12th/13th century	Ps.Od.	Neue Slg., X 150	Sinai	Egypt
1324		12th/13th century	Ps.	Neue Slg., X 161	Sinai	Egypt
1325		12th/13th century	Ps.	Neue Slg., X 208	Sinai	Egypt
1326		12th/13th century	Ps.	Neue Slg., X 209	Sinai	Egypt
1327		12th/13th century	Ps.	Neue Slg., X 211	Sinai	Egypt
1328		12th/13th century	Ps.	Neue Slg., X 212	Sinai	Egypt
1329		12th/13th century	Ps.	Neue Slg., X 213	Sinai	Egypt
1330		12th/13th century	Ps.	Neue Slg., X 216	Sinai	Egypt
1331		12th/13th century	Ps.	Neue Slg., X 217	Sinai	Egypt
1332		12th/13th century	Ps.	Neue Slg., X 231	Sinai	Egypt
1333		11th century	Cat. in Ps.	ZSBS, Dujčev 117	Sofia	Bulgaria
1334		11th century	Ps.Od.	ZSBS, Dujčev 238	Sofia	Bulgaria
1335		11th century	Ps.Od.	Μ. Βλατ., 87	Thessaloniki	Greece
1336		11th century	Ps.Od.	Ζάβορδα, Νικαν. 10		Greece

=== Part VI: 1401–2000 ===
==== 1401–1500 ====
Symbol	Name	Date	Content	Institution	City	Country
1401		13th century	Ps.Od.	Άγιας, 6	Andros	Greece
1402		15th century	Ps.Od.	Άγιας, 10	Andros	Greece
1403		14th century	Ps.Od.	Νικολάου, 26	Andros	Greece
1404		16th century	Ps.	Νικολάου, 27	Andros	Greece
1405		15th century	Ps.Od.	Abgeordnetenhaus, 104	Athens	Greece
1406		14th century	Cat. in Ps.Od.	EBE, 8	Athens	Greece
1407		1535	Ps.Od.	EBE, 12	Athens	Greece
1408		15th century	Ps.	EBE, 14	Athens	Greece
1409		14th century	Ps.	EBE, 15	Athens	Greece
1410		15th century	Ps.	EBE, 16	Athens	Greece
1411		1577	Ps.	EBE, 18	Athens	Greece
1412		16th century	Ps.Od.	EBE, 19	Athens	Greece
1413		1493	Ps.Od.	EBE, 122	Athens	Greece
1414		1550	Ps.	EBE, 23	Athens	Greece
1415		14th century	Ps.Od.	EBE, 26	Athens	Greece
1416		1578	Ps.Od.	EBE, 32	Athens	Greece
1417		14th century	Ps.	EBE, 33	Athens	Greece
1418		1543	Ps.Od.	EBE, 34	Athens	Greece
1419		16th century	Ps.Od.	EBE, 35	Athens	Greece
1420		13th century	Cat. in Ps.	EBE, 45	Athens	Greece
1421		15th century	Ps.	EBE, 48	Athens	Greece
1422		15th century	Ps.	EBE, 49	Athens	Greece
1423		16th century	Ps.	EBE, 50	Athens	Greece
1424		14th century	Ps.	EBE, 51	Athens	Greece
1425		16th century	Ps.	EBE, 55	Athens	Greece
1426		13th/16th century	Ps. 148–150; Od. 8	BnF, Copt. 68	Paris	France
1427		13th century	Ps. 44:13–17	BnF, Copt. 12919, Bl. 65	Paris	France
1428		14th century	Ps. 135 and 150	Kopt. Mus., Inv. 20	Cairo	Egypt
1429		13th century	Ps.Od.	Вατοπαιδίου, 762	Mount Athos	Greece
1430		13th century	Ps.	Γρηγορίου, 4	Mount Athos	Greece
1431		16th century	Cat. Nicetae in Ps.	Γρηγορίου, 5	Mount Athos	Greece
1432		13th century	Ps.	Διονυσίου, 33; RBN Gr. 270?	Mount Athos; Petersburg	Greece; Russia
1433		13th century	Ps.	Διονυσίου, 60	Mount Athos	Greece
1434		c. 1312	Ps.	Διονυσίου, 65	Mount Athos	Greece
1435		13th century	Cat. in Ps.	Διονυσίου, 114	Mount Athos	Greece
1436		16th century	Ps.	Διονυσίου, 226	Mount Athos	Greece
1437		1487	Ps.	Διονυσίου, 385	Mount Athos	Greece
1438		1571	Ps.	Διονυσίου, 389	Mount Athos	Greece
1439		16th century	Ps.	Διονυσίου, 391	Mount Athos	Greece
1440		1498	Ps.	Διονυσίου, 394	Mount Athos	Greece
1441		16th century	Ps.	Διονυσίου, 397	Mount Athos	Greece
1442		16th century	Ps.	Διονυσίου, 398	Mount Athos	Greece
1443		1546	Ps.	Διονυσίου, 431	Mount Athos	Greece
1444		16th century	Ps.Od.	Διονυσίου, 602	Mount Athos	Greece
1445		14th century	Ps.	Δοχειαρείου, 50	Mount Athos	Greece
1446		13th century	Ps.	Δοχειαρείου, 53	Mount Athos	Greece
1447		16th century	Ps.	Δοχειαρείου, 144	Mount Athos	Greece
1448		15th century	Ps.	Δοχειαρείου, 145	Mount Athos	Greece
1449		13th century	Ps. fragm.	Έσφιγμένου, 27	Mount Athos	Greece
1450		13th century	Cat. in Ps.	Έσφιγμένου, 73	Mount Athos	Greece
1451		1558	Ps.	Έσφιγμένου, 188	Mount Athos	Greece
1452		16th century	Ps.	Έσφιγμένου, 196	Mount Athos	Greece
1453		15th century	Ps.	Έσφιγμένου, 200	Mount Athos	Greece
1454		16th century	Ps.	Ζωγράφου, 2	Mount Athos	Greece
1455		13th century	Ps.	Ήλίου, 1	Mount Athos	Greece
1456		13th century	Ps.Od.	Ίβήρων, 58	Mount Athos	Greece
1457		13th century	Ps.Od.	Ίβήρων, 74	Mount Athos	Greece
1458		16th century	Ps.	Ίβήρων, 503	Mount Athos	Greece
1459		14th century	Ps.	Ίβήρων, 554	Mount Athos	Greece
1460		16th century	Ps.	Ίβήρων, 559	Mount Athos	Greece
1461		14th century	Ps. fragm.	Ίβήρων, 612	Mount Athos	Greece
1462		16th century	Ps.	Ίβήρων, 626	Mount Athos	Greece
1463		15th century	Ps.	Ίβήρων, 627	Mount Athos	Greece
1464		1550	Ps.	Ίβήρων, 631	Mount Athos	Greece
1465		15th century	Ps.	Ίβήρων, 633	Mount Athos	Greece
1466		16th century	Ps.	Ίβήρων, 773	Mount Athos	Greece
1467		15th century	Ps.	Ίβήρων, 774	Mount Athos	Greece
1468		1518	Ps.	Ίβήρων, 809	Mount Athos	Greece
1469		15th century	Ps.	Ίβήρων, 815	Mount Athos	Greece
1470		15th century	Ps.	Ίβήρων, 830	Mount Athos	Greece
1471		1548	Ps.	Ίβήρων, 846	Mount Athos	Greece
1472		16th century	Ps.	Ίβήρων, 877	Mount Athos	Greece
1473		16th century	Ps.	Ίβήρων, 899	Mount Athos	Greece
1474		16th century	Ps.	Ίβήρων, 907	Mount Athos	Greece
1475		1562	Ps.	Ίβήρων, 908	Mount Athos	Greece
1476		16th century	Ps.	Ίβήρων, 909	Mount Athos	Greece
1477		1598	Ps.	Ίβήρων, 918	Mount Athos	Greece
1478		1408	Ps.	Ίβήρων, 924	Mount Athos	Greece
1479		16th century	Ps.	Ίβήρων, 940	Mount Athos	Greece
1480		1346	Ps.Od.	Ίβήρων, 1384	Mount Athos	Greece
1481		15th century	Ps.	Καρακάλλου, 140	Mount Athos	Greece
1482		15th century	Ps.	Καρακάλλου, 152	Mount Athos	Greece
1483		1512	Ps.	Καρακάλλου, 154	Mount Athos	Greece
1484		13th century	Cat. in Ps. fragm.	Κουτλουμουσίου, 17	Mount Athos	Greece
1485		14th century	Ps.	Κουτλουμουσίου, 86	Mount Athos	Greece
1486		13th century	Ps.	Κουτλουμουσίου, 88	Mount Athos	Greece
1487		15th century	Cat. Nicetae in Ps.	Κουτλουμουσίου, 123	Mount Athos	Greece
1488		16th century	Ps.	Κουτλουμουσίου, 198	Mount Athos	Greece
1489		16th century	Ps.	Κουτλουμουσίου, 258	Mount Athos	Greece
1490		16th century	Ps.	Κουτλουμουσίου, 267	Mount Athos	Greece
1491		16th century	Ps.	Κουτλουμουσίου, 333	Mount Athos	Greece
1492		1526	Ps.	Κουτλουμουσίου, 352	Mount Athos	Greece
1493		16th century	Ps.	Κουτλουμουσίου, 353	Mount Athos	Greece
1494		1543	Ps.	Κουτλουμουσίου, 361	Mount Athos	Greece
1495		15th century	Ps.	Κουτλουμουσίου, 373	Mount Athos	Greece
1496		15th century	Ps.	Κωνσταμονίτου, 74	Mount Athos	Greece
1497		13th century	Ps.	Κωνσταμονίτου, 107; Bibl. RAdW, Cod. Nr. 32	Mount Athos; Petersburg	Greece; Russia
1498		14th century	Ps.Od.	Λαύρα, 90	Mount Athos	Greece
1499		14th/15th century	Ps.	Λαύρα, 132	Mount Athos	Greece
1500		1309	Ps.	Λαύρα, 133	Mount Athos	Greece

==== 1501–1600 ====
Symbol	Name	Date	Content	Institution	City	Country
1501		1351	Ps.	Λαύρα, 143	Mount Athos	Greece
1502		before 1494	Ps.	Λαύρα, 144	Mount Athos	Greece
1503		?	Ps.Od.	Λαύρα, 156	Mount Athos	Greece
1504		12th? century	Ps.Od.	Λαύρα, 164	Mount Athos	Greece
1505		12th/13th century	Ps.	Λαύρα, 166	Mount Athos	Greece
1506		13th? century	Ps.	Λαύρα, 167	Mount Athos	Greece
1507		12th? century	Ps.	Λαύρα, 170	Mount Athos	Greece
1508		15th century	Ps.	Λαύρα, 835	Mount Athos	Greece
1509		15th? century	Ps.Od.	Λαύρα, 850	Mount Athos	Greece
1510		1303	Comm. in Ps.Od.	Ξενοφώντος, 5 + 7	Mount Athos	Greece
{1511} locked			see item 1510	Ξενοφώντος, 7	Mount Athos	Greece
1512		16th century	Ps.	Ξηροποτάμοὒ, 69	Mount Athos	Greece
1513		16th century	Ps.	Ξηροποτάμοὒ, 128	Mount Athos	Greece
1514		13th century	Ps.Od.	Παντελεήμωνος, 23	Mount Athos	Greece
1515		16th century	Ps.Od.	Παντελεήμωνος, 303	Mount Athos	Greece
1516		16th century	Ps.	Παντελεήμωνος, 358	Mount Athos	Greece
1517		1521	Ps.	Παντελεήμωνος, 402	Mount Athos	Greece
1518		16th century	Ps.	Παντελεήμωνος, 403	Mount Athos	Greece
1519		16th century	Ps.	Παντελεήμωνος, 404	Mount Athos	Greece
1520		16th century	Ps.	Παντελεήμωνος, 405	Mount Athos	Greece
1521		16th century	Ps.	Παντελεήμωνος, 411	Mount Athos	Greece
1522		16th century	Ps.	Παντελεήμωνος, 412	Mount Athos	Greece
1523		16th century	Ps.	Παντελεήμωνος, 413	Mount Athos	Greece
1524		1554	Ps.	Παντελεήμωνος, 414	Mount Athos	Greece
1525		16th century	Ps.	Παντελεήμωνος, 452	Mount Athos	Greece
1526		1513	Ps.	Παντελεήμωνος, 702	Mount Athos	Greece
1527		16th century	Ps.Od.	Παντελεήμωνος, 707	Mount Athos	Greece
1528		16th century	Ps.	Παντελεήμωνος, 708	Mount Athos	Greece
1529		16th century	Ps.	Παντελεήμωνος, 840	Mount Athos	Greece
1530		13th century	Ps.Od.	Παντοκράτορος, 43	Mount Athos	Greece
1531		14th century	Ps.	Παντοκράτορος, 177	Mount Athos	Greece
1532		13th century	Ps.	Παντοκράτορος, 234	Mount Athos	Greece
1533		13th century	Ps.	Σταυρονικήτα, 57	Mount Athos	Greece
1534		1588	Ps.	Σταυρονικήτα, 100	Mount Athos	Greece
1535		16th century	Ps.	Σταυρονικήτα, 130	Mount Athos	Greece
1536		13th century	Ps.	Φιλοθέου, 29	Mount Athos	Greece
1537		16th century	Ps.	Φιλοθέου, 69	Mount Athos	Greece
1538		15th century	Ps.	Φιλοθέου, 75	Mount Athos	Greece
1539		16th century	Ps.	Φιλοθέου, 161	Mount Athos	Greece
1540		15th century	Ps.	Φιλοθέου, 203	Mount Athos	Greece
1541		15th century	Ps.	Φιλοθέου, 231	Mount Athos	Greece
1542		15th century	Ps.	Φιλοθέου, 238	Mount Athos	Greece
1543		13th century	Ps.	Χιλανταρίου, 4	Mount Athos	Greece
1544		15th century	Ps.	Χιλανταρίου, 12	Mount Athos	Greece
1545		13th century	Ps.Od.	JL, Ms. Berlin graec. oct. 7	Kraków	Poland
1546		13th century	Ps.Od.	JL, Ms. Berlin graec. oct. 13	Kraków	Poland
1547		15th century	Or.Man	JL, Ms. Berlin graec. qu. 19	Kraków	Poland
1548		13th century	Ps.Od.	JL, Ms. Berlin graec. qu. 43	Kraków	Poland
1549		c. 1540	Cat. in Ps.Od.	Staatsbibl., Phill. 1409	Berlin	Germany
1550		15th/16th century	Cat. in Ps.Od.	Staatsbibl., Phill. 1462	Berlin	Germany
1551		c. 1056 lub 13th/14th?	Ps.Od.	Bibl. publ., 44	Besançon	France
1552		15th century	Ps.Od.	Bibl. Royale, 11336	Brussels	Belgium
1553		13th century	Ps.Od.	Corp. Chr. Coll., 468	Cambridge	U. Kingdom
1554		12th/13th century	Ps. 68	Univ. Libr., MS 125	Chicago	United States
1555		14th/15th century	Ps.Od.	Trinity Coll., B. 10. 11	Chicago	United States
1556		15th century	Ps.Od.	Trinity Coll., O. 3. 14	Chicago	United States
1557		16th century	Cat. Nicetae in Ps.	Trinity Coll., O. 3. 15	Chicago	United States
1558		1557	Ps.	Patr.-Bibl., Καμαρ. 32	Istanbul	Turkey
1559		13th century	Ps.	Patr.-Bibl., Καμαρ. 77	Istanbul	Turkey
1560		13th century	Ps.Od.	Patr.-Bibl., Καμαρ. 133	Istanbul	Turkey
1561		?	Ps. fragm.	Bibl. Mun., 1754, art. 4	Chartres	France
1562		1540	Ps.Od.	Sächs. Landesbibl., A. 304	Dresden	Germany
1563		16th century	Cat. Nicetae in Ps.	Trinity Coll., A. 3. 16 (część druga)	Dublin	Ireland
1564		15th/16th century	Ps.Od.	Trinity Coll., K. 4. 24	Dublin	Ireland
1565		1504	Ps.Od.	Klosterbibl., 19	Einsiedeln	Switzerland
1566		14th century	Cat. Nicetae in Ps. fragm.	Real Bibl., Υ (griech.)-II-1	El Escorial	Spain
1567		16th century	Cat. in Od. fragm.	Real Bibl., Ψ-I-3	El Escorial	Spain
1568		16th century	Cat. in Od.	Real Bibl., Ψ-IV-19	El Escorial	Spain
1569		1570	Cat. in Od.	Real Bibl., Ω-IV-6	El Escorial	Spain
1570		15th century	Ps.Od.	Real Bibl., Ω-IV-8	El Escorial	Spain
1571		15th century	Ps.Od.	Laurentian Library, Conv. soppr. 14	Florence	Italy
1572		1447	Ps.Od.	Laurentian Library, Conv. soppr. 34	Florence	Italy
1573		15th century	Ps.Od.	Laurentian Library, S. Marco 708	Florence	Italy
1574		15th century	Ps.Od.	Laurentian Library, Plut. V 21	Florence	Italy
1575		15th century	Ps.Od.	Laurentian Library, Plut. XVII 13	Florence	Italy
1576		16th century	Ps.Od.	Bibl. Naz., Centr. 52	Florence	Italy
1577		13th century	Ps.	Feldinv.-Nr. Add. 97/150	Alt-Dongola	
1578		15th century	Ps.Od.	Bibl. Riccard., 74	Florence	Italy
1579		13th century	Ps.Od.	Reguliertes Chorherrenstift, XI. 459 A	Florence	Austria
1580		16th century	Ps.	Bibl. publ. and univ., 21	Geneva	Switzerland
1581		14th century	Cat. in Ps.Od.	Bibl. Franz., 22	Genoa	Italy
1582		1282	Ps.Od.	A. γ. II	Grottaferrata	Italy
1583		1329	Ps.Od.	A. γ. VII	Grottaferrata	Italy
1584		13th century	Ps.	A. γ. X	Grottaferrata	Italy
1585		15th century	Ps.Od.	A. γ. XIV	Grottaferrata	Italy
1586		14th century	Ps. fragm.	A. δ. XI, Nr. I	Grottaferrata	Italy
1587		13th century	Ps. fragm.	A. δ. XI, Nr. V	Grottaferrata	Italy
1588		?	Ps. fragm.	A. δ. XI, Nr. IX	Grottaferrata	Italy
1589		13th century	Cat. in Ps.	B. α. LVIII	Grottaferrata	Italy
1590		15th century	Ps.	Patr.-Bibl., Άβραάμ 19	Jerusalem	Israel
1591		14th century	Ps.	Patr.-Bibl., Μικρά Γαλ. 8	Jerusalem	Israel
1592		c. 1481	Ps.	EBE, Μετ. Τάφου, 386	Athens	Greece
1593		1548	Ps.	Patr.-Bibl., Σάβα 45	Jerusalem	Israel
1594		15th century	Ps.	Patr.-Bibl., Σάβα 59	Jerusalem	Israel
1595		1685	Cat. in aliqout Ps.	Patr.-Bibl., Σάβα 88	Jerusalem	Israel
1596		15th century	Ps.	Patr.-Bibl., Σάβα 162	Jerusalem	Israel
1597		16th century	Ps.	Patr.-Bibl., Σάβα 164	Jerusalem	Israel
1598		16th century	Ps.Od.	Patr.-Bibl., Σάβα 211	Jerusalem	Israel
1599		1338	Cat. Nicandae in Ps.Od.	Patr.-Bibl., Σάβα 231	Jerusalem	Israel
1600		15th century	Ps.	Patr.-Bibl., Σάβα 285	Jerusalem	Israel

==== 1601–1700 ====
Symbol	Name	Date	Content	Institution	City	Country
1601		15th century	Ps.	Patr.-Bibl., Σάβα 293; RBN, Gr. 393	Jerusalem; Petersburg	Israel; Russia
1602		?	Cat. in Ps. fragm.	Patr.-Bibl., Σάβα 308	Jerusalem	Israel
1603		16th century	Ps.	Patr.-Bibl., Σάβα 313	Jerusalem	Israel
1604		16th century	Ps.	Patr.-Bibl., Σάβα 314	Jerusalem	Israel
1605		15th century	Ps.	Patr.-Bibl., Σάβα 317	Jerusalem	Israel
1606		16th century	Ps.	Patr.-Bibl., Σάβα 346	Jerusalem	Israel
1607		15th century	Ps.	Patr.-Bibl., Σάβα 394	Jerusalem	Israel
1608		1557	Ps.Od.	Patr.-Bibl., Σάβα 396; K. öff Bibl, Gr. 392	Jerusalem; Petersburg	Israel; Russia
1609		13th century	Ps.	Patr.-Bibl., Σάβα 409	Jerusalem	Israel
1610		16th century	Ps.	Patr.-Bibl., Σάβα 435	Jerusalem	Israel
1611		16th century	Ps.	Patr.-Bibl., Σάβα 564	Jerusalem	Israel
1612		16th century	Ps.	Patr.-Bibl., Σάβα 565	Jerusalem	Israel
1613		15th century	Ps. fragm.	Patr.-Bibl., Σάβα 605α	Jerusalem	Israel
1614		13th century	Ps.	Patr.-Bibl., Σάβα 608	Jerusalem	Israel
1615		16th century	Ps. fragm.	Patr.-Bibl., Σάβα 613	Jerusalem	Israel
1616		14th century	Ps. fragm.	Patr.-Bibl., Σάβα 617β	Jerusalem	Israel
1617		1570	Ps.	Patr.-Bibl., Σάβα 622; RBN, Gr. 394	Jerusalem; Petersburg	Israel; Russia
1618		15th century	Ps.	Patr.-Bibl., Σάβα 623	Jerusalem	Israel
1619		16th century	Ps.Od.	Patr.-Bibl., Σάβα 634	Jerusalem	Israel
1620		15th century	Ps.	Patr.-Bibl., Σάβα 636	Jerusalem	Israel
1621		12th/13th century	Ps.Od.	Patr.-Bibl., Σάβα 643	Jerusalem	Israel
1622		1595	Ps.	Patr.-Bibl., Σάβα 668; RBN, Gr. 395	Jerusalem; Petersburg	Israel; Russia
1623		13th century	Ps.	Patr.-Bibl., Σάβα 677	Jerusalem	Israel
1624		13th/14th century	Ps. fragm.	Patr.-Bibl., Σάβα 704	Jerusalem	Israel
1625		14th/15th century	Cat. in Ps.Od.	Patr.-Bibl., Σταυροὒ 1	Jerusalem	Israel
1626		15th century	Ps.Od.	Patr.-Bibl., Σταυροὒ 69	Jerusalem	Israel
1627		16th century	Ps.Od.	Patr.-Bibl., Σταυροὒ 81	Jerusalem	Israel
1628		16th century	Ps.Od.	Patr.-Bibl., Σταυροὒ 99	Jerusalem	Israel
1629		15th century	Ps.Od.	Patr.-Bibl., Σταυροὒ 103α	Jerusalem	Israel
1630		13th century	Ps.Od.	Patr.-Bibl., Σταυροὒ 105	Jerusalem	Israel
1631		16th century	Ps.	Patr.-Bibl., Τάφου 70	Jerusalem	Israel
1632		1502	Ps.	Patr.-Bibl., Τάφου 86	Jerusalem	Israel
1633		16th century	Ps.	Patr.-Bibl., Τάφου 410	Jerusalem	Israel
1634		1470	Ps.Od.	Patr.-Bibl., Τάφου 537	Jerusalem	Israel
1635		1507	Ps.	Griech. Part.-Bibl., 341 (earlier 449)	Alexandria	Egypt
1636		1483	Ps.	Griech. Part.-Bibl., ? (earlier 925)	Alexandria	Egypt
1637		1597	Ps.	Geistl. Akad., Kirchl.-archäol. Mus, 1	Kiev	Ukraine
1638		14th/15th century	Ps. fragm.	Geistl. Akad., Kirchl.-archäol. Mus, 5	Kiev	Ukraine
1639		16th century	Ps. fragm.	Geistl. Akad., Kirchl.-archäol. Mus, 6	Kiev	Ukraine
1640		15th/16th century	Ps.Od.	Kgl. Bibl., Gamle Kgl. Saml., 4° Nr. 6	Copenhagen	Denmark
1641		14th/15th century	Ps.	Univ.-Bibl., Fabric. 94 in 8°	Copenhagen	Denmark
[1642] missing		16th century	Ps.	А-γ. Λαυρ., 4	Pilio	Greece
1643		15th century	Ps.Od.	Univ. Bibl., Graec. 5	Leipzig	Germany
1644		13th century	Ps.	Λειμώνος, 30	Lesbos	Greece
1645		16th century	Ps.	Λειμώνος, 115	Lesbos	Greece
1646		16th century	Ps.	Λειμώνος, 140	Lesbos	Greece
1647		1527	Ps.	Λειμώνος, 220	Lesbos	Greece
1648		1581	Ps. sine Od.	Bibliothèque, 1	Lille	France
1649		13th/14th century	Ps. 140-141, 129 (reduced)	IfP, without number (P. Baden V 129)	Heidelberg	Germany
1650		12th/13th century	Ps.Od.	BL, Add. 40656	London	U. Kingdom
1651		13th century	Cat. in Ps.	BL, Add. 10068	London	U. Kingdom
1652		14th century	Ps.Od.	BL, Add. 11752	London	U. Kingdom
1653		13th century	Ps.Od.	BL, Add. 11835	London	U. Kingdom
1654		15th century	Ps.	BL, Add. 14063	London	U. Kingdom
1655		13th century	Ps.Od.	BL, Add. 21030	London	U. Kingdom
1656		16th century	Ps.Od.	BL, Add. 28819	London	U. Kingdom
1657		15th century	Ps.Od.	BL, Burn. 14	London	U. Kingdom
1658		16th century	Ps.Od.	BL, Burn. 15	London	U. Kingdom
1659		16th century	Ps. fragm.	BL, Burn. 276, Bl. 7-14	London	U. Kingdom
1660		16th century	Ps.	BL, Harl. 2427	London	U. Kingdom
1661		14th century	Ps.Od.	BL, Harl. 5541	London	U. Kingdom
1662		?	Ps. fragm.	BL, Harl. 5597	London	U. Kingdom
1663		15th century	Cat. Nicetae in Ps.	BL, Harl. 5677	London	U. Kingdom
1664		14th century	Ps.	BL, Harl. 5723	London	U. Kingdom
1665		13th? century	Ps.Od.	Bibl, Pubbl., 2502	Lucca	Italy
1666		16th century	Cat. in Ps.Od.	Bibl. Nac., 4670	Madrid	Spain
1667		1556	Cat. in Ps.Od.	Bibl. Nac., 4702-4704	Madrid	Spain
1668		1563	Cat. in Od.	Bibl. Univ., 15	Salamanca	Spain
1669		14th/15th century	Cat. in Od.	Bibl. Univ., 29	Salamanca	Spain
1670		14th/15th century	Ps.Od.	Arch. Hist. Univ., E. 1, no 30	Madrid	Spain
1671		???	Ps.Od.	Biblioteca Ambrosiana, B. 1 sup.	Milan	Italy
1672		15th century	Ps.Od.	Biblioteca Ambrosiana, C. 13 inf.	Milan	Italy
1673		16th century	Cat. in Ps.	Biblioteca Ambrosiana, C. 264 inf.	Milan	Italy
1674		15th century	Ps. fragm.	Biblioteca Ambrosiana, D. 58 sup.	Milan	Italy
1675		16th century	Cat. in Ps.	Biblioteca Ambrosiana, F. 126 sup.	Milan	Italy
1676		15th century	Ps.Od.	Biblioteca Ambrosiana, G. 12 sup.	Milan	Italy
1677		14th century	Ps.	Biblioteca Ambrosiana, G. 36 sup.	Milan	Italy
1678		1464	Ps.Od.	Biblioteca Ambrosiana, G. 94 sup.	Milan	Italy
1679		13th century	Ps.Od.	Biblioteca Ambrosiana, H. 60 sup.	Milan	Italy
1680		13th century	Cat. in Ps.Od.	Biblioteca Ambrosiana, H. 112 sup.	Milan	Italy
1681		13th century	Ps.Od.	Biblioteca Ambrosiana, I. 14 sup.	Milan	Italy
1682		13th century	Ps.	Biblioteca Ambrosiana, Q. 15 sup.	Milan	Italy
1683		12th/13th century	Ps.Od.	Bibl. private, Trivulzio, 340	Milan	Italy
1684		15th century	Ps.	Bibl. private, Trivulzio, 2161	Milan	Italy
1685		1547	Ps.Od.	R. Staats-Bibl., Sevast. 25	Moscow	Russia
1686		1275	Cat. in Ps.	State Historical Museum, Syn. gr. 197	Moscow	Russia
1687		15th century	Ps.Od.	State Historical Museum, Syn. gr. 357	Moscow	Russia
1688		14th/15th century	Cat. in Ps.Od.	State Historical Museum, Syn. gr. 414	Moscow	Russia
1689		16th century	Ps.Od.	State Historical Museum, Syn. gr. 417	Moscow	Russia
1690		1550	Cat. in Ps.Od.	BSB, Gr. 12 and 13	Munich	Germany
1691		16th century	Cat. in Od.	BSB, Gr. 66	Munich	Germany
1692		16th century	Cat. in Od.	BSB, Gr. 296	Munich	Germany
1693		15th century	Cat. in Od.	BSB, Gr. 527	Munich	Germany
1694		16th century	Ps.Od.	Bibl. Naz., II. A. 1	Naples	Italy
1695		14th century	Ps.Od.	Bibl. Naz., II. A. 2	Naples	Italy
1696		16th century	Cat. in Od., Cat. in Ps. fragm.	Bibl. Naz., II. B. 11	Naples	Italy
1697		13th century	Ps.Od.	Stadtbibl., Solger. in duodec. 1	Nuremberg	Germany
1698		13th/14th century	Ps.	Nat.-Mus., 20 (Inv. 20)	Ohrid	North Macedonia
1699		13th lub 14th century	Ps.	Nat.-Mus., 22 (Inv. 59)	Ohrid	North Macedonia
1700		14th/15th century	Ps.	Nat.-Mus., 21 (Inv. 30)	Ohrid	North Macedonia

==== 1701–1800 ====
Symbol	Name	Date	Content	Institution	City	Country
1701		16th century	Ps.Od.	Nat.-Mus., 23	Ohrid	North Macedonia
1702		16th century	Cat. in. Ps.	Bodleian Library, Auct. E. 1. 5	Oxford	U. Kingdom
1703		15th century (or younger)	Ps. fragm.	Bodleian Library, Auct. T. 2. 11	Oxford	U. Kingdom
1704		14th century	Ps.	Bodleian Library, Barocc. 25	Oxford	U. Kingdom
1705		15th century	Cat. in Ps.	Bodleian Library, Barocc. 154	Oxford	U. Kingdom
1706		15th century	Cat. in Ps.Od.	Bodleian Library, Barocc. 223	Oxford	U. Kingdom
1707		15th century	Ps.Od.	Bodleian Library, Canonic. gr. 17	Oxford	U. Kingdom
1708		15th century	Ps.Od.	Bodleian Library, Canonic. gr. 18	Oxford	U. Kingdom
1709		1453	Ps.Od.	Bodleian Library, Canonic. gr. 31	Oxford	U. Kingdom
1710		15th century	Ps.Od.	Bodleian Library, Canonic. gr. 37	Oxford	U. Kingdom
1711		13th century	Ps.Od.	Bodleian Library, Canonic. gr. 63	Oxford	U. Kingdom
1712		13th century	Ps.Od.	Bodleian Library, Canonic. gr. 114	Oxford	U. Kingdom
1713		15th century	Cat. in Ps.	New. Coll., 31	Oxford	U. Kingdom
1714		14th/15th century	Ps. (hebr. -gr. -arab. - syr.)	Univ. Libr., Or. 929	Cambridge	U. Kingdom
1715		15th century	Ps.Od.	Bibl. Univ., 1321	Padua	Italy
1716		12th/13th century	Ps.Od.	Mus. Naz, Ms. 4; Free Libr., Lewis 353	Palermo; Philadelphia	Italy; United States
1717		14th century	Cat. in Ps.	BnF, Coisl. 12	Paris	France
1718		15th century	Cat. in Ps.	BnF, Coisl. 189	Paris	France
1719		13th century	Cat. Nicetae in Ps.	BnF, Coisl. 190	Paris	France
1720		13th century	Ps.	BnF, Coisl. 358	Paris	France
1721		1419	Ps.Od.	BnF, Gr. 12	Paris	France
1722		15th century	Ps.Od.	BnF, Gr. 28	Paris	France
1723		1438	Ps.Od.	BnF, Gr. 30	Paris	France
1724		1469	Ps.Od.	BnF, Gr. 31	Paris	France
1725		15th century	Ps.Od.	BnF, Gr. 32	Paris	France
1726		15th century	Ps.Od.	BnF, Gr. 33	Paris	France
1727		15th century	Ps.Od.	BnF, Gr. 34	Paris	France
1728		14th century	Ps.Od.	BnF, Gr. 43	Paris	France
1729		14th century	Ps.Od.	BnF, Gr. 44	Paris	France
1730		15th century	Ps.Od.	BnF, Gr. 45	Paris	France
1731		15th century	Psalms poenitentiales	BnF, Gr. 46	Paris	France
1732		1364	Ps.Od.	BnF, Gr. 47	Paris	France
1733		13th century	Ps.Od.	BnF, Gr. 106 A	Paris	France
1734		16th century	Cat. in Ps.	BnF, Gr. 148	Paris	France
1735		14th century	Cat. in Ps.	BnF, Gr. 166 and 167	Paris	France
1736		14th century	Cat. in Ps.	BnF, Gr. 169	Paris	France
1737		16th century	Cat. in Ps. fragm.	BnF, Gr. 171	Paris	France
1738		15th century	Od.	BnF, Gr. 269	Paris	France
1739		11th-14th century	Ps. fragm.	BnF, Gr. 328	Paris	France
1740		15th century	Ps.Od.	BnF, Gr. 336	Paris	France
1741		13th century	Psalms graduales	BnF, Gr. 352	Paris	France
1742		16th century	Ps.Od.	BnF, Gr. 2743	Paris	France
1743		14th-16th century	Ps. fragm.	BnF, Gr. 1100	Paris	France
1744		15th century	Ps.	BnF, Gr. 2500	Paris	France
1745		12th/13th century	Ps.	BnF, Lat. 15198	Paris	France
1746		16th century	Ps.	BnF, Suppl. gr. 117	Paris	France
1747		13th century	Ps.	BnF, Suppl. gr. 188	Paris	France
1748		13th century	Ps.Od.	BnF, Suppl. gr. 473	Paris	France
1749		15th century	Ps. fragm.	BnF, Suppl. gr. 774	Paris	France
1750		15th century	Ps.	BnF, Suppl. gr. 801	Paris	France
1751		15th century	Ps.	BnF, Suppl. gr. 802	Paris	France
1752		14th century	Ps. fragm.	BnF, Suppl. gr. 1000	Paris	France
1753		15th century	Ps.Od.	BnF, Suppl. gr. 1032	Paris	France
1754		15th century	Ps.Od.	BnF, Suppl. gr. 1227	Paris	France
1755		1458	Ps.Od.	BnF, Suppl. gr. 1272	Paris	France
1756		13th century	Cat. in Ps.	Ίωάννου τοὒ Θεολόγου, 215	Patmos	Greece
1757		13th century	Ps.Od.	Ίωάννου τοὒ Θεολόγου, 268	Patmos	Greece
1758		12th? century	Cat. in Ps.	Ίωάννου τοὒ Θεολόγου, 420	Patmos	Greece
1759		14th century	Ps.Od.	Bibl. Comun, L. 31	Perugia	Italy
1760		14th century	Ps.	RBN Gr. 115	Petersburg	Russia
1761		13th century	Ps. fragm.	RBN Gr. 271	Petersburg	Russia
1762		14th century	Ps.	RBN Gr. 518	Petersburg	Russia
1763		1510	Ps.Od.	RBN Gr. 545	Petersburg	Russia
1764		1540	Ps.Od.	Geistl. Akad., Sof. Bibl., 78	Petersburg	Russia
1765		16th century	Ps.Od., Excerpta e Sap. and Sir.	Geistl. Akad., Sof. Bibl., 79	Petersburg	Russia
1766		1422	Psalms graduales	Bibl. Angel., Gr. 59	Rome	Italy
1767		15th century	Ps.Od.	Bibl. Casanatense, 240	Rome	Italy
1768		16th century	Ps.Od.	Vatican Library, Chis. R. IV. 5	Vatican City	
1769		15th century	Cat. in Ps.	Bibl. Vallicell., Gr. 58	Rome	Italy
1770		13th century	Ps.Od.	Bibl. Vallicell., Gr. 68	Rome	Italy
1771		16th century	Ps. fragm.	Vatican Library, Barber. gr. 289	Vatican City	
1772		15th century	Ps.Od.	Vatican Library, Barber. gr. 321	Vatican City	
1773		15th century	Ps. fragm.	Vatican Library, Barber. gr. 366	Vatican City	
1774		15th century	Ps.	Vatican Library, Barber. gr. 406	Vatican City	
1775		16th century	Cat. in Od.	Vatican Library, Barber. gr. 548	Vatican City	
1776		15th century	Ps.Od.	Vatican Library, Vat. Palat. Gr. 87	Vatican City	
1777		14th/15th century	Ps.Od.	Vatican Library, Vat. Palat. Gr. 107	Vatican City	
1778		1452	Ps.Od.	Vatican Library, Vat. Palat. Gr. 225	Vatican City	
1779		15th century	Cat. in Ps.	Vatican Library, Pii II. gr. 26	Vatican City	
1780		13th century	Ps.	Vatican Library, Regin. gr. 187	Vatican City	
1781		15th century	Ps.	Vatican Library, Vat. arab. 581	Vatican City	
1782		15th century	Ps.	Vatican Library, Vat. gr. 340	Vatican City	
1783		16th century	Cat. in Ps. 1, Tht. comm. in Ps. / Cat. in Od.	Vatican Library, Vat. gr. 617	Vatican City	
1784		1341?	Ps.Od.	Vatican Library, Vat. gr. 695	Vatican City	
1785		14th century	Ps. fragm.	Vatican Library, Vat. gr. 773	Vatican City	
1786		c. 1390	Ps.Od.	Vatican Library, Vat. gr. 778	Vatican City	
1787		1291	Ps.Od.	Vatican Library, Vat. gr. 1070	Vatican City	
1788		15th century	Cat. in Ps.Od.	Vatican Library, Borgian. gr. 2-4	Vatican City	
1789		16th century	Cat. in Od.	Vatican Library, Vat. gr. 1232	Vatican City	
1790		16th century	Ps.Od.	Vatican Library, Vat. gr. 1399	Vatican City	
1791		16th century	Ps.	Vatican Library, Vat. gr. 1460	Vatican City	
1792		16th century	Cat. in Od., Cat. in Ps. fragm.	Vatican Library, Vat. gr. 1493	Vatican City	
1793		16th century	Cat. in Ps.Od.	Vatican Library, Vat. gr. 1617	Vatican City	
1794		16th century	Cat. in Od.	Vatican Library, Vat. gr. 1664	Vatican City	
1795		16th century	Cat. in Ps.Od.	Vatican Library, Vat. gr. 1677 and 1678	Vatican City	
1796		16th century	Cat. in Ps.Od.	Vatican Library, Vat. gr. 1682 and 1683	Vatican City	
1797		16th century	Cat. in Ps.Od.	Vatican Library, Vat. gr. 1685	Vatican City	
1798		13th century	Ps.Od.	Vatican Library, Vat. gr. 1866	Vatican City	
1799		15th? century	Ps. fragm.	Vatican Library, Vat. gr. 1882, Bl. 1-9	Vatican City	
1800		15th century	Ps.	Vatican Library, Vat. gr. 1896, 2296I (Bl. 51-100) and 2297	Vatican City	

==== 1801–1900 ====
Symbol	Name	Date	Content	Institution	City	Country
1801		15th century	Ps.Od.	Vatican Library, Vat. gr. 1952	Vatican City	
1802		14th century	Ps.Od.	Vatican Library, Vat. gr. 2012	Vatican City	
1803		13th century	Ps.Od.	Vatican Library, Vat. gr. 2263	Vatican City	
1804		13th century	Ps.	Vatican Library, Vat. gr. 2296I, Bl. 9-50	Vatican City	
1805		12th/13th century	Ps. fragm.	Vatican Library, Vat. gr. 2296II, Bl. 111-114	Vatican City	
1806		12th/13th century	Ps.	Vatican Library, Vat. gr. 2296II, Bl. 115-146	Vatican City	
1807		paper	Cat. in Ps.	Henneberg. Gymn.	Schleusingen	Germany
1808		perg.	Ps.	EBE, 2485	Athens	Greece
1809		perg.	Ps.	EBE, 2415	Athens	Greece
1810		perg.	Ps.	EBE, 2494	Athens	Greece
1811		?	Ps.	Cod. gr. 22	Sinai	Egypt
1812		14th century	Cat. in Ps.	Cod. gr. 23	Sinai	Egypt
1813		1452	Cat. in Ps.Od.	Cod. gr. 27	Sinai	Egypt
1814		13th/14th century	Ps.Od.	Cod. gr. 38; RBN, Gr. 269	Sinai; Petersburg	Egypt; Russia
1815		14th century	Ps.Od.	Cod. gr. 40	Sinai	Egypt
1816		?	Ps.	Cod. gr. 43	Sinai	Egypt
1817		14th/15th century	Ps.Od.	Cod. gr. 46	Sinai	Egypt
1818		12th century	Ps.Od.	Cod. gr. 47 + Neue Slg., Μ 125	Sinai	Egypt
1819		?	Ps.	Cod. gr. 49	Sinai	Egypt
1820		?	Ps.	Cod. gr. 50	Sinai	Egypt
1821		15th century	Ps.Od.	Cod. gr. 51	Sinai	Egypt
1822		12th/13th century	Ps.Od.	Cod. gr. 52	Sinai	Egypt
1823		14th century	Ps.	Cod. gr. 53	Sinai	Egypt
1824		13th century	Ps.Od.	Cod. gr. 54	Sinai	Egypt
1825		1344	Ps.Od.	Cod. gr. 55; RBN, Gr. 272	Sinai; Petersburg	Egypt; Russia
1826		13th century	Ps.Od.	Cod. gr. 58	Sinai	Egypt
1827		c. 1273	Ps.Od.	Cod. gr. 61	Sinai	Egypt
1828		13th century	Ps.	Cod. gr. 62	Sinai	Egypt
1829		13th/14th century	Ps.Od.	Cod. gr. 63	Sinai	Egypt
1830		13th century	Ps.Od.	Cod. gr. 64	Sinai	Egypt
1831		13th/14th century	Ps.Od.	Cod. gr. 66	Sinai	Egypt
1832		13th/14th century	Ps.Od.	Cod. gr. 67	Sinai	Egypt
1833		16th century	Ps.Od.	Cod. gr. 70	Sinai	Egypt
1834		1550	Ps.Od.	Cod. gr. 71	Sinai	Egypt
1835		16th century	Ps.Od.	Cod. gr. 75	Sinai	Egypt
1836		1565	Ps.	Cod. gr. 87	Sinai	Egypt
1837		1566	Ps.Od.	Cod. gr. 90	Sinai	Egypt
1838		1563	Ps.Od.	Cod. gr. 92	Sinai	Egypt
1839		1293	Ps.Od.	Cod. gr. 94; RBN, Gr. 391	Sinai; Petersburg	Egypt; Russia
1840		1532	Ps.Od.	Cod. gr. 95	Sinai	Egypt
1841		15th century	Ps.Od.	Cod. gr. 96	Sinai	Egypt
1842		1517	Ps.Od.	Cod. gr. 97	Sinai	Egypt
1843		1499	Ps.Od.	Cod. gr. 99	Sinai	Egypt
1844		1534	Ps.Od.	Cod. gr. 101	Sinai	Egypt
1845		15th century	Ps.Od.	Cod. gr. 102	Sinai	Egypt
1846		1532	Ps.Od.	Cod. gr. 103	Sinai	Egypt
1847		16th century	Ps.Od.	Cod. gr. 104	Sinai	Egypt
1848		1506	Ps.Od.	Cod. gr. 105	Sinai	Egypt
1849		16th century	Ps.Od.	Cod. gr. 106	Sinai	Egypt
1850		16th century	Ps.Od.	Cod. gr. 107	Sinai	Egypt
1851		13th/14th century	Ps.	Cod. gr. 108	Sinai	Egypt
1852		15th/16th century	Ps.Od.	Cod. gr. 109	Sinai	Egypt
1853		15th century	Ps.Od.	Cod. gr. 110	Sinai	Egypt
1854		15th/16th century	Ps.Od.	Cod. gr. 111	Sinai	Egypt
1855		15th century	Ps.Od.	Cod. gr. 112	Sinai	Egypt
1856		16th century	Ps.Od.	Cod. gr. 113	Sinai	Egypt
1857		15th/16th century	Ps.Od.	Cod. gr. 114	Sinai	Egypt
1858		15th/16th century	Ps.	Cod. gr. 115	Sinai	Egypt
1859		15th century	Ps.Od.	Cod. gr. 116	Sinai	Egypt
1860		1544	Ps.Od.	Cod. gr. 117	Sinai	Egypt
1861		1580	Ps.Od.	Cod. gr. 118	Sinai	Egypt
1862		15th century	Ps.Od.	Cod. gr. 119	Sinai	Egypt
1863		16th century	Ps.Od.	Cod. gr. 120	Sinai	Egypt
1864		16th? century	Ps.Od.	Cod. gr. 122	Sinai	Egypt
1865		16th century	Ps.Od.	Cod. gr. 123	Sinai	Egypt
1866		1565	Ps.Od.	Cod. gr. 124	Sinai	Egypt
1867		14th? century	Ps.Od.	Cod. gr. 125	Sinai	Egypt
1868		16th century	Ps.Od.	Cod. gr. 126	Sinai	Egypt
1869		14th century	Ps.Od.	Cod. gr. 127	Sinai	Egypt
1870		1548	Ps.Od.	Cod. gr. 128	Sinai	Egypt
1871		1356	Ps.Od.	Cod. gr. 129	Sinai	Egypt
1872		1203	Ps.Od.	Cod. gr. 130; RBN, Gr. 390	Sinai; Petersburg	Egypt; Russia
1873		14th century	Ps.Od.	Cod. gr. 131	Sinai	Egypt
1874		14th century	Ps.Od.	Cod. gr. 132	Sinai	Egypt
1875		14th century	Ps.Od.	Cod. gr. 133	Sinai	Egypt
1876		1500	Ps.Od.	Cod. gr. 134	Sinai	Egypt
1877		14th century	Ps.	Cod. gr. 135	Sinai	Egypt
1878		1542	Ps.Od.	Cod. gr. 136	Sinai	Egypt
1879		15th century	Ps.Od.	Cod. gr. 137	Sinai	Egypt
1880		15th/16th century	Ps.Od.	Cod. gr. 139	Sinai	Egypt
1881		15th century	Ps.Od.	Cod. gr. 140	Sinai	Egypt
1882		12th lub 14th century	Ps.Od.	Cod. gr. 259	Sinai	Egypt
1883		13th century	Ps.	Cod. gr. 550	Sinai	Egypt
1884		1564	Ps.Od.	Cod. gr. without number	Sinai	Egypt
1885		15th century	Ps.	Σουμελἄ, 28	Trabzon	Turkey
1886		16th century	Ps.	Σουμελἄ, 39	Trabzon	Turkey
1887		14th century	Ps.	Σουμελἄ, 64	Trabzon	Turkey
1888		16th century	Ps.	Σουμελἄ, 73	Trabzon	Turkey
1889		15th century	Ps.Od.	Bibliothèque, 1699	Troyes	France
1890		13th century	Cat. Nicetae in Ps.	Bibl. Naz., B. I. 5	Turin	Italy
1891		13th century	Cat. in Ps.Od.	Bibl. Naz., B. I. 8	Turin	Italy
1892		15th century	Ps.	Bibl. Naz., B. IV. 10	Turin	Italy
1893		13th century	Ps.	Bibl. Naz., B. V. 8	Turin	Italy
1894		13th century	Ps.	Bibl. ex.-Reale, 378	Turin	Italy
1895		1369	Ps.Od.	Univ.-Bibl, Gr. 10	Uppsala	Sweden
1896		15th? century	Ps.Od.	Univ.-Bibl, Gr. 24	Uppsala	Sweden
1897		1446	Ps.Od.	Bibl. Marc., Append. I 2	Venice	Italy
1898		13th century	Ps.Od.	Bibl. Marc., Append. I 16	Venice	Italy
1899		14th century	Ps.Od.	Bibl. Marc., Append. I 26	Venice	Italy
1900		16th century	Ps.	Bibl. Marc., Append. I 27	Venice	Italy

==== 1901–2000 ====
Symbol	Name	Date	Content	Institution	City	Country
1901		16th century	Cat. in Ps.	Bibl. Marc., Append. I 41	Venice	Italy
1902		15th century	Ps.Od.	Bibl. Marc., Append. I 62	Venice	Italy
1903		15th century	Ps.Od.	Bibl. Marc., Append. II 127	Venice	Italy
1904		14th century	Ps.Od.	Bibl. Marc., Gr. 505	Venice	Italy
1905		14th century	Cat. in Ps.	Bibl. Marc., Gr. 536	Venice	Italy
1906		13th century	Cat. in. Ps.	ÖNB, Theol. gr. 59	Vienna	Austria
1907		c. 1231	Cat. in. Od.	ÖNB, Theol. gr. 159	Vienna	Austria
1908		15th century	Ps.Od.	ÖNB, Theol. gr. 175	Vienna	Austria
1909		1370	Psalms aliquot	ÖNB, Theol. gr. 236	Vienna	Austria
1910		16th century	Cat. in Ps. fragm.	ÖNB, Theol. gr. 252	Vienna	Austria
1911		1234	Cat. in Ps.Od.	ÖNB, Theol. gr. 299	Vienna	Austria
1912		15th century	Cat. in Od.	ÖNB, Theol. gr. 329	Vienna	Austria
1913		paper	Ps.	Biblioteka private, Peckover, 20	Wisbech	U. Kingdom
1914		c. 1510	Ps.	Staatl. Wiss. Bibl., M 364	Olomouc	Czech Republic
1915		1591	Ps.	Univ. Libr., Laing 12	Edinburgh	U. Kingdom
1916		12th/13th century	Ps.	Bibl. Abbaziale, BB 467	Monte Cassino	Italy
1917		1242	Ps.Od.	Cod. gr. 2123	Sinai	Egypt
1918		11th & 16th century	Cat. in Ps.Od.	Griech. Part.-Bibl., 7 + 11	Alexandria	Egypt
1919		16th? century	Ps.	Griech. Part.-Bibl., 120	Alexandria	Egypt
1920		15th century	Ps.Od.	Griech. Part.-Bibl., 259	Alexandria	Egypt
1921		16th century	Ps.	Griech. Part.-Bibl., 408	Alexandria	Egypt
1922		16th century	Ps.Od.	Griech. Part.-Bibl., 416	Alexandria	Egypt
1923		15th/16th century	Ps.<Od.>	Χοζοβιωτίσσας 69	Amorgos	Greece
1924		1406	Ps.	Χοζοβιωτίσσας 90	Amorgos	Greece
1925		16th century	Ps.Od.	Millî Kütüphane, 59	Ankara	Turkey
1926		15th century	Ps.Od.	UML, gr. 65	Ann Arbor	United States
1927		1470	Ps.Od.	UML, gr. 66	Ann Arbor	United States
1928		13th century	Ps.Od.	UML, gr. 81	Ann Arbor	United States
1929		13th century	Ps.Od.	UML, gr. 172	Ann Arbor	United States
1930		1587	Ps.Od.	EBE, 2203	Athens	Greece
1931		13th century	Ps.Od.	EBE, 2365	Athens	Greece
1932		1340	Ps.Od.	EBE, 2478	Athens	Greece
1933		16th century	Ps.	EBE, 2586	Athens	Greece
1934		14th century	Ps.Od.	EBE, 2699	Athens	Greece
1935		16th century	Ps.Od.	Σιν. Μετ., 2	Athens	Greece
1936		16th century	Ps.Od.	Αννης, 52	Mount Athos	Greece
1937		16th century	Ps.	Вατοπαιδίου, 981	Mount Athos	Greece
1938		1538	Ps.Od.	Вατοπαιδίου, 985	Mount Athos	Greece
1939		13th century	Ps.Od.	Вατοπαιδίου, 1222	Mount Athos	Greece
1940		14th century	Ps.	Вατοπαιδίου, 1223	Mount Athos	Greece
1941		1578	Ps.	Вατοπαιδίου, 1225	Mount Athos	Greece
1942		14th century	Ps.	Вατοπαιδίου, 1226	Mount Athos	Greece
1943		14th century	Ps.	Вατοπαιδίου, 1227	Mount Athos	Greece
1944		1345	Ps.	Вατοπαιδίου, 1228	Mount Athos	Greece
1945		15th century	Ps.Od.	Вατοπαιδίου, 1230	Mount Athos	Greece
1946		16th century	Ps.Od.	Вατοπαιδίου, 1234	Mount Athos	Greece
1947		16th century	Ps.Od.	Вατοπαιδίου, 1235	Mount Athos	Greece
1948		15th century	Ps.	Вατοπαιδίου, 1236	Mount Athos	Greece
1949		16th century	Ps.	Вατοπαιδίου, 1237	Mount Athos	Greece
1950		16th century	Ps.	Вατοπαιδίου, 1238	Mount Athos	Greece
1951		16th century	Ps.	Вατοπαιδίου, 1240	Mount Athos	Greece
1952		16th century	Ps.	Вατοπαιδίου, 1241	Mount Athos	Greece
1953		16th century	Ps.	Вατοπαιδίου, 1242	Mount Athos	Greece
1954		1592	Ps.	Вατοπαιδίου, 1245	Mount Athos	Greece
1955		15th century	Ps.	Вατοπαιδίου, 1246	Mount Athos	Greece
1956		13th century	Ps.	Διονυσίου, 586 B, Bl. 1	Mount Athos	Greece
1957		14th century	Ps.	Διονυσίου, K-348/663 - Euth. 592	Mount Athos	Greece
1958		14th century	Ps.	Διονυσίου, K-349/664 - Euth. 656	Mount Athos	Greece
1959		16th century	Ps.	Έσφιγμένου, Inv.-Nr. 79	Mount Athos	Greece
1960		13th century	Cat. in Ps.Od.	Ίβήρων, 53 (4173)	Mount Athos	Greece
1961		13th century	Ps.Od.	Ίβήρων, 65 (4185)	Mount Athos	Greece
1962		XIVA	Ps.Od.	Ίβήρων, 1572	Mount Athos	Greece
1963		1302	Ps.	Κωνσταμονίτου, 110	Mount Athos	Greece
1964		13th century	Ps.	Λαύρα, 123 (Β 3)	Mount Athos	Greece
1965		1302	Ps.	Λαύρα, 135 (Β 15)	Mount Athos	Greece
1966		15th century	Ps.Od.	Λαύρα, 917 (Θ 55)	Mount Athos	Greece
1967		16th century	Ps.	Λαύρα, 1164 (Ι 80)	Mount Athos	Greece
1968		15th century	Ps.	Λαύρα, 1222 (Ι 138)	Mount Athos	Greece
1969		15th century	Ps.	Λαύρα, 1313 (Κ 26)	Mount Athos	Greece
1970		1562	Ps.	Λαύρα, 1359 (Κ 72)	Mount Athos	Greece
1971		1598	Ps.	Λαύρα, 1567 (Λ 76)	Mount Athos	Greece
1972		15th century	Ps.	Λαύρα, 1667 (Λ 176)	Mount Athos	Greece
1973		undated	Ps.	Λαύρα, 1694 (М 3)	Mount Athos	Greece
1974		undated	Ps.	Λαύρα, 1740 (М 49)	Mount Athos	Greece
1975		undated	Ps.	Λαύρα, 1741 (М 50)	Mount Athos	Greece
1976		16th century	Cat. in Ps.	Λαύρα, 1887 (Θ 76β)	Mount Athos	Greece
1977		1566	Ps.Od.	Ξηροποτάμοὒ, 247	Mount Athos	Greece
1978		13th century	Ps.Od.	Walters Art Gall., W.733	Baltimore	United States
1979		???	Cat. in Ps.Od. (??) missing	Orthodox, Ms. 11	Berat	Albania
1980		???	Cat. in Ps.Od. (??) missing	Orthodox, Ms. 37	Berat	Albania
1981		???	Ps.Od.	Kath.-Bibl., 5	Veria	Greece
1982		15th/16th century	Ps.Od.	Kath.-Bibl., 6	Veria	Greece
1983		?	Ps.	Bibl. Royale, IV 54	Brussels	Belgium
1984		16th century	Ps.	Bibl. Royale, IV 100	Brussels	Belgium
1985		1460-70	Ps.	Bibl. Royale, IV 602	Brussels	Belgium
1986		1591	Ps.	Bibl. Royale, IV 733	Brussels	Belgium
1987		c. 1200	Ps.Od.	Duke Univ. Libr., Ms. Gr. 34	Durham	United States
1988		1434	Ps.Od.	Duke Univ. Libr., Ms. Gr. 55	Durham	United States
1989		16th century	Cat. in Ps.	Μονή Όλυμπ., 54	Elassona	Greece
1990		15th century	Cat. in Ps.	Μονή Όλυμπ., 182	Elassona	Greece
1991		15th century	Ps.	Matenadaran, gr. 77	Yerevan	Armenia
1992		16th? century	Ps.	Μονή Γεωργ. Хουτ.; 3 ε	Gümüşhane	Turkey
1993		16th century	Ps.Od.	Ζάβορδα, Νικαν. 47		Greece
1994		16th century	Ps.Od.	Ζάβορδα, Νικαν. 56		Greece
1995		15th century	Ps.Od.	Ζάβορδα, Νικαν. 71		Greece
1996		16th century	Ps.Od.	Ζάβορδα, Νικαν. 79		Greece
1997		16th century	Ps.Od.	Ζάβορδα, Νικαν. 112		Greece
1998		15th century	Ps.Od.	Ζάβορδα, Νικαν. 128		Greece
1999		16th century	Ps.Od.	Ζάβορδα, Νικαν. 131		Greece
2000		1516	Ps.Od.	Δημ. Βιβλ., 7	Hinterland	Greece

=== Part VII: 2001–3000 ===
Symbol	Name	Date	Content	Institution	City	Country
[2001] missing		9th/10th century	Ps. 1?–2?	Ägyptisches Museum, P. ? (Blaß Nr. IV)	Berlin	Germany
2002		5th century	Ps. 105:38–45; 106:2–10 fragm.	Ägyptisches Museum, P. 5011	Berlin	Germany
[2003] missing		7th century	Ps. 39:16–40:11 fragm.	Ägyptisches Museum, P. 5018	Berlin	Germany
[2004] missing		3rd/4th century	Ps. 79:2–16	Staatl. Mus., Antiqu., Misc. 8630	Berlin	Germany
2005		7th century	Ps. 21:15–28 sec. Hexapla fragm.	Univ. Libr., T-S 12. 182	Cambridge	U. Kingdom
2006		6th century	Ps. 143:1–144:6 fragm.	Univ. Libr., T-S 16. 320	Cambridge	U. Kingdom
2007		5th/6th century	Ps. 22:6–23:2; 24:2–5 fragm.	Philol. Sem.	Jena	Germany
2008		5th/6th century	Ps. 5:6–12 fragm.	PML, Pap. G. 5	New York	United States
2009		7th? century	Ps. 107:14–108:2, 12–13; 118:115–122, 126–135; 135:18–140:4 (with gaps)	PML, Pap. G. 6 and 2000	New York	United States
2010		5th century	Ps. 58:7–13; 58:16–59:3 fragm.	PML, Pap. G. 7	New York	United States
2011		8th century	Ps. 135:13–136:9; 140:1–142:1 fragm.	Westm. Coll., Cod. Clim. Rescr., Bl. 26f	Cambridge	U. Kingdom
2012		4th century	Ps. 14:1-5	Luwr, MA 3373	Paris	France
2013		4th century	Psalms 30–55	Univ. Bibl. P., Inv. Nr. 39; Univ. Bibl., P. Bonn 147v	Leipzig; Bonn	Germany
2014	P.Leipzig inv. 170	2nd/3rd century	Ps. 118:27–63(?) fragm.	Univ. Bibl. P., Inv. Nr. 170	Leipzig	Germany
2015		5th/6th century	Ps. 9:3–118:112; 146:9–11 (with gaps)	British Library, Add. 34274, Bl. 51 + Or. 3579 A (17); Kopt. Mus., Inv. 3855 + 3857 + 3859 + 3865; PML, M 706 c; BnF, Copt. 1292, Bl. 1, 2, 33, 98, 105-112; + Copt. 1322, Bl. 18 and 51; + Copt. 1323, Bl. 177 and 202; + Copt. 1331, Bl. 57, 57a and 58; ÖNB, P. Vindob. K 31; + P. Vindob. K 902; + P. Vindob. K 8343; + P. Vindob. K 9851; + P. Vindob. K 9871; + P. Vindob. K 9872	London; Cairo; New York; Paris; Vienna	U. Kingdom; Egypt; United States; France; Austria
2016		6th/7th century	Ps. 76:5–15; 77:8–16; 85:8–86:5	BL, Add. 34473, art. 7	London	U. Kingdom
2017		7th/8th century	Ps. 64:7–65:2; 68:14–21; 106:43–107:10; 129:3–137:8	BL, Add. 34602.1 (= Bl. 1-9); Bodleian Library, Ms. Gr. (bibl.) d. 3 (P); BnF, Suppl. gr. 1092	London; Oxford; Paris	U. Kingdom; France
{2018} locked			see item 2015	British Library, Or. 3579 A (17)	London	U. Kingdom
2019		3rd century	Ps. 11:7–14:4	BL, P. Inv. Nr. 230 (recto)	London	U. Kingdom
2020		5th/6th century	Ps. 90:5–16	John Rylands Library, P. Gr. 3	Manchester	U. Kingdom
2021		5th century	Ps. 25:7–26:7 fragm.	Ägyptisches Museum, P. 9754	Berlin	Germany
2022		6th/7th century	Ps. 50:14–20 fragm.	Ägyptisches Museum, P. 10501	Berlin	Germany
2023		7th/8th century	Ps. 118:132–134 fragm.	Bodleian Library, Ms. copt. g. 3	Oxford	U. Kingdom
2024		7th century	Ps. 1:3	Bodleian Library, Gr. th. g. 6 (P)	Oxford	U. Kingdom
2025		3rd/4th century	Ps. 7:9–12; 8:1–4 fragm.	P.Oxy. 1226	Oxyrhynchus	
{2026} locked			see item 2017	BnF, Suppl. gr. 1092	Paris	France
2027		4th/5th century	Ps. 141:7–142:3; 144:7–13	RBN Gr. 4	Petersburg	Russia
2028		6th century	Ps. 78:5–8.39f	RBN Gr. 15	Petersburg	Russia
2029		4th century	Ps. 101:3–4; 102:5–8; 105:34–43; 106:27–34; 108:15–21; 113:18–26; 114:3–115:2	Harris Nr. 4	Sinai	Egypt
2030		6th century	Ps. 26	ÖNB, P. Vindob. G 8022	Vienna	Austria
2031		4th century	Ps. 90:1–2 / quotes of NT	ÖNB, P. Vindob. G 2312	Vienna	Austria
2032		10th/11th century	Ps. 98:5–8; 148:1–4, 7; 150:1–4	BnF, Copt. 12919, Bl. 64; ÖNB, P. Vindob. K 9722	Paris; Vienna	France; Austria
{2033} locked			see item 2015	ÖNB, P. Vindob. K 9851	Vienna	Austria
{2034} locked			see item 2015	ÖNB, P. Vindob. K 9871	Vienna	Austria
{2035} locked			see item 2015	ÖNB, P. Vindob. K 9872	Vienna	Austria
2036		6th century	Od. fragm.	ÖNB, P. Vindob. K 8706	Vienna	Austria
2037		4th century	Ps. 18:15–19:3; 20:1–4 fragm.	ÖNB, P. Vindob. G 39772	Vienna	Austria
2038		6th century	Ps. 33:5–10, 12–18 fragm.	ÖNB, P. Vindob. G 39774	Vienna	Austria
2039		5th century	Ps. 72:11–15, 20–23; 88:51–89:1, 5–8 fragm.	ÖNB, P. Vindob. G 39775 a, b	Vienna	Austria
2040		5th/6th century	Ps. 105:20–21, 25–26; 106:25–27, 30–32 fragm.	ÖNB, P. Vindob. G 39776	Vienna	Austria
[2041] missing		5th century	Ps. 1:1 (?)	ÖNB, AN 26	Vienna	Austria
2042		4th/5th century	Ps. 68:30–37; 70:3–8 fragm.	P.Oxy. 845	Oxyrhynchus	
[2043] missing		7th/8th century	Ps. 90:1–6 fragm.	Ägyptisches Museum, P. 3601	Berlin	Germany
2044		5th century	Ps. 103:2–20	Ägyptisches Museum, P. 5874	Berlin	Germany
2045		4th/5th century	Ps. 28:6–11; 29:3–8 fragm.	Ägyptisches Museum, P. 5875	Berlin	Germany
2046		4th century	Ps. 35:12–36:10, 14–25	Ägyptisches Museum, P. 6747 + 6785	Berlin	Germany
2047		8th century	Ps. 67:2–28 fragm.	Ägyptisches Museum, P. 7954	Berlin	Germany
2048		6th century	Ps. 90:1–7, 10–13	Bibl. publ. and univ., Ms. gr. 50	Geneva	Switzerland
2049		4th century	Ps. 82:6–83:4 fragm.	P.Oxy. 1352	Oxyrhynchus	
2050		4th century	Ps. 39:15–41:5	University of Paris, Inv. 827	Paris	France
2051		3rd century	Ps. 2:3–12	BL, P. Inv. Nr. 2556	London	U. Kingdom
{2052} locked			see item 2015	ÖNB, P. Vindob. K 31	Vienna	Austria
2053		4th century	Ps. 9:12–14, 16–17, 18–25 fragm.	ÖNB, P. Vindob. G 30893 + P. Vindob. G 40405 + P. Vindob. G 29525 + P. Vindob. G 30465 + P. Vindob. G 39786	Vienna	Austria
2054		2nd/3rd century	Ps. 77:1–18 fragm.	Gr.-Röm. Mus., P. Alex. Inv. 240	Alexandria	Egypt
2055		3rd/4th century	Ps. 143:14–148:3	Laurentian Library, PSI 980	Florence	Italy
2056		4th century	Ps. 111:1; 73:2	Univ. Bibl., P. 305	Gießen	Germany
2057		6th century	Ps. 3:4–9; 44:3; 62:2, 4–5	John Rylands Library, P. Gr. 461	Manchester	U. Kingdom
2058		6th/7th century	Ps. 148:9–14; 149:1–9; 150 fragm.	John Rylands Library, P. Gr. 462	Manchester	U. Kingdom
2059		4th century	Ps. 17:45, 47–51; 18:2–4 fragm.	Ägyptisches Museum, P. 11682	Berlin	Germany
2060		4th century	Ps. 103:18–19, 26–27; 105:17–18, 25–26	Ägyptisches Museum, P. 16390	Berlin	Germany
2061		6th/7th century	Ps. 51:4–7; 52:2–5 fragm.	Ägyptisches Museum, P. 16703	Berlin	Germany
2062		7th/8th century	Ps. 90:1–13	Ägyptisches Museum, P. 3642 + 3639	Berlin	Germany
2063		7th/8th century	quotes of Ps. 61–138	Ägyptisches Museum, P. 11763	Berlin	Germany
2064		4th century	Ps. 36:5–24	Laurentian Library, PSI 1371	Florence	Italy
2065		7th century	Ps. 141:2–6	Int. Pap., "G. Vitelli" PSI Inv. 1372	Florence	Italy
2066		5th century	Ps. 3:4–8	UML, P. Mich. Inv. 1573	Ann Arbor	United States
2067		3rd century	Ps. 8:3–9; 9:1, 7–17 fragm.	UML, P. Mich. Inv. 22	Ann Arbor	United States
2068		7th century	Ps. 109:1–4	Mus. Royaux, E 370	Brussels	Belgium
2069		6th century	Ps. 49:1–7 fragm.	Kekelidze Inst., Inv. Nr. 220	Tbilisi	Georgia
2070		4th/5th century	Ps. 83:9–13; 84:2 fragm.	P.Oxy. 2386	Oxyrhynchus	
2071		6th/7th century	Ps. 20:2–5 fragm.	Or. Inst. Mus., O. Medinet Habu 1269	Chicago	United States
2072		7th/8th century	Ps. 30:3–8 fragm.	Or. Inst. Mus., O. Medinet Habu 1175	Chicago	United States
2073	P. Oxyrhynchus 1779	4th century	Psalm 1:4–6	United Theological Seminary, P. Oxy. 1779	Dayton	United States
2074		5th century	Ps. 90:1–4 fragm.	Laurentian Library, PSI 759v	Florence	Italy
2075		4th/5th century	Ps. 90:1 + quotes of NT	Laurentian Library, PSI 719	Florence	Italy
2076		before 650	quotes of Ps. 18–36	Rijksmus. v. Oud., MS Insinger 41	Leiden	Netherlands
2077	P. Antinoopolis 7	2nd century	Ps. 81:1–4; 82:4–9, 16–17 fragm.	Sackler Library, P. Ant 7	Oxford	U. Kingdom
2078		10th/11th century	Ps. 77:65–69 fragm.	ÖNB, P. Vindob. K 9730	Vienna	Austria
{2079} locked			see item 2015	ÖNB, P. Vindob. K 8343	Vienna	Austria
{2080} locked			see item 2017	Bodleian Library, Ms. Gr. (bibl.) d. 3 (P)	Oxford	U. Kingdom
2081		5th/6th century	Ps. 90:13–16 fragm.	Bodleian Library, Gr. bibl. e. 6 (P)	Oxford	U. Kingdom
2082	P.Bodl. MS bibl. Gr. 5	2nd/3rd century	Ps. 48:20–21; 49:1–3, 17–21 fragm.	Bodleian Library, Gr. bibl. g. 5 (P)	Oxford	U. Kingdom
2083		7th century	Ps. 140:1–8, 10 fragm.	University of Paris, Inv. 2136	Paris	France
{2084} locked			see item 2015	BnF, Copt. 1292, Bl. 1 etc.	Paris	France
2085		6th century	Ps. 2:7; 64:2; 86:2.5; 109:3	ÖNB, P. Vindob. G 27290 A	Vienna	Austria
{2086} locked			see item 2053	ÖNB, P. Vindob. G 29525 + 30465	Vienna	Austria
2087		6th century	Ps. 11:9–12:3; 12:6–13:1 fragm.	ÖNB, P. Vindob. G 35772	Vienna	Austria
2088		7th/8th century	Ps. 16:15; 17:3 fragm.	ÖNB, P. Vindob. G 3090	Vienna	Austria
2089		6th/7th century	Ps. 17:7–11 fragm.	ÖNB, P. Vindob. G 26047	Vienna	Austria
2090		4th/5th century	Ps. 32:9–15	ÖNB, P. Vindob. G 29274	Vienna	Austria
2091		6th/7th century	Ps. 34:1–8, 11–14	ÖNB, P. Vindob. G 26205r + G 26607r	Vienna	Austria
2092		7th century	Ps. 54:2–8, 15–20 fragm.	ÖNB, P. Vindob. G 26113	Vienna	Austria
2093		5th/6th century	Ps. 3:5–6; 62:2–3	ÖNB, P. Vindob. G 26166	Vienna	Austria
2094		3rd century	Ps. 67:35–68:4, 8–14 fragm.	ÖNB, P. Vindob. G 26035 B	Vienna	Austria
2095		6th/7th century	Ps. 68:3–5, 9–12 fragm.	ÖNB, P. Vindob. G 35782	Vienna	Austria
2096		7th century	Ps. 77:1–8 fragm.	ÖNB, P. Vindob. G 19920	Vienna	Austria
2097		5th century	Ps. 91:15–92:1; 93:1 fragm.	ÖNB, P. Vindob. G 3093	Vienna	Austria
2098		7th century	Ps. 92:1–4	ÖNB, P. Vindob. G 26228 B	Vienna	Austria
2099		6th century	Ps. 92:1; 103:10–12 fragm.	ÖNB, P. Vindob. G 26781	Vienna	Austria
2100		9th century	Ps. 105:16; 117:17	ÖNB, P. Vindob. G 19809	Vienna	Austria
2101		6th century	Ps. 118:122–123, 130–132 fragm.	ÖNB, P. Vindob. G 3080	Vienna	Austria
2102		5th/6th century	Ps. 3:2–4; 118:155–160	ÖNB, P. Vindob. G 26786	Vienna	Austria
2103		6th/7th century	Ps. 135:10–13, 19–21 fragm.	ÖNB, P. Vindob. G 35887	Vienna	Austria
2104		6th century	Ps. 138:17–139:1, 3–8 fragm.	ÖNB, P. Vindob. G 26100	Vienna	Austria
2105		5th/6th century	Ps. 90:5–10 fragm.	P.Oxy. 2065	Oxyrhynchus	
2106		5th/6th century	Ps. 90:1–16	P.Oxy. 1928	Oxyrhynchus	
[2107] missing		4th century	Ps. 117:19–20	NLH Nr. V	?	
2108		4th century	Ps 40:20–23 fragm.	Woodbr. Coll., OLCR, P. Inv. 182 i	Birmingham	U. Kingdom
2109		before 650	Ps. 45:11–12 fragm.	MMA, Mon. Epiph. 580	New York	United States
2110		2nd/4th century	Ps. 17:45–118:44 (with gaps)	Bodmer Library, P. Bodm. XXIV	Washington, D.C.	United States
2111		7th century	Ps. 42:3	Ashm. Mus., Gr. Inscr. 2912	Oxford	U. Kingdom
2112		7th century	Ps. 67:2–3 fragm.	Ashm. Mus., Gr. Inscr. 2926 a + b	Oxford	U. Kingdom
2113		4th century	Ps. 33:2–34:17	Bodmer Library, P. Bodm. IX	Cologny (Canton of Geneva)	Switzerland
2114		6th/7th century	Ps. 28:3	Mus. Royaux, E 6801	Brussels	Belgium
2115		4th century	Ps. 90:1–4 fragm.	Univ. Bibl., Inv. 1644	Oslo	Norway
2116		5th/6th century	Ps. 91:14–16 fragm.	Eleph.-Mus., O. Eleph.DAIK Nr. 165	Aswan	Egypt
2117		3rd century	Ps. 144:1–10, 16–145:4 fragm.	Ägyptisches Museum, P. 21265	Berlin	Germany
{2118} locked			see item 2015	ÖNB, P. Vindob. K 902	Vienna	Austria
2119		6th century	Ps. 149:1–6	Ostr. Inv. n. 43	Deir el Giza-z	Egypt
2120		7th century	Od. 8:62–73 fragm.	ÖNB, P. Vindob. G 25199 + 41406 + 41407 + 41413	Vienna	Austria
2121		6th century	Ps. 21:19 (par. NT)	ÖNB, P. Vindob. G 29418	Vienna	Austria
2122		2nd/3rd century	Ps. 1:2–3 fragm.	Int. Pap., "G. Vitelli" PSI Inv. 1989	Florence	Italy
2123		6th/7th century	Ps. 65:9–20; 98:1–8; 103:3–24; 108:4–11, 14–17, 24–31; 117:12–20; Ps. 103–135 (Incipits)	Kopt. Mus., P. Naqlun I, 1–5	Cairo	Egypt
2124		5th century	Ps. 90:1–9	Inst. Pap., Inv. 501	Leiden	Netherlands
2125		6th/7th century	Od. 8:57–62(?) fragm.	MMA, Inv. 12.180.334	New York	United States
2126		6th century	Ps. 71:12, 16–17 fragm.	Sackler Library, P. Ant. 51	Oxford	U. Kingdom
2127		5th/6th century	Ps. 8:1, 3–4, 7–8; 12:2–3, 5–6; 120:1–2, 5–7	private collections, without number	South Salem	United States
2128		8th century	Ps. 100:1–4; 100:8–101:3	University of Paris, Inv. 2125	Paris	France
2129		5th century	Ps. 15:1–4; 16:2–5 fragm.	Univ.-Bibl., P. Inv. 83	Amsterdam	Netherlands
2130		5th/6th century	Ps. 1:3–6; 2:6–9	Sem. Pap., P. Palau Rib. Inv. 33	Barcelona	Spain
2131		6th/7th century	quotes of Ps. 17, 90, 117 and NT	Ägyptisches Museum, P. 6096	Berlin	Germany
2132		6th/7th century	Od. 1:1–2	Ägyptisches Museum, P. 16158	Berlin	Germany
2133		5th/6th century	Ps. 1:1–2	Int. Pap., "G. Vitelli" Inv. 533	Florence	Italy
2134		5th/6th century	Ps. 114:5–8 fragm.	Univ., IFC, PUG I 2	Genoa	Italy
2135		10th century	Ps. 70:20–72:12	IfP, P. Heid. Inv. G 2071	Heidelberg	Germany
{2136} locked			see item 2015	Kopt. Mus., Inv. 3855 + 3857 + 3859 + 3865	Cairo	Egypt
2137		10th/11th century	Ps. 46:1–6	Kopt. Mus., Inv. 3856	Cairo	Egypt
2138		before 650	Ps. 33:2–5 fragm.	Ägypt. Mus., Inv. 44674.162	Cairo	Egypt
2139		4th/5th century	Ps. 30:14–18 fragm.	BL, P. Inv. Nr. 0507e	London	U. Kingdom
2140		5th century	Ps. 14:1–3 fragm.	IfA, P.Colon. Inv. 525	Cologne	Germany
2141		5th/6th century	Od. 1	Rijksmus. v. Oud., Inv. I, 451 (A.AL 161)	Leiden	Netherlands
2142		3rd/5th century	Ps. 19:7–8 fragm.	John Rylands Library, Add. Box III, without number	Manchester	U. Kingdom
2143		before 650	Od. 8:57–66, 71, 72 fragm.	MMA, Inv. 14.1.203	New York	United States
2144		4th century	Ps. 1:1 fragm.	Mus. Egizio, P. Taur. Inv. 27	Turin	Italy
2145		6th/7th century	Ps. 9:4–13 fragm.	ÖNB, P. Vindob. G 3084	Vienna	Austria
2146		Byzantium	Ps. 39:3–6 fragm.	Ägyptisches Museum, P. 17098	Berlin	Germany
2147		8th/9th century	Od. 8:64–66, 71 fragm.	Kunsthist. Mus., Inv. 8585	Vienna	Austria
2148		6th century	Ps. 50:9–12 fragm.	John Rylands Library, Add. Box III, folder no 11	Manchester	U. Kingdom
2149		4th century	Ps. 72:6–75:13; 77:1–88:2 z. T. fragm.	Chester Beatty Library, P. Ch. Beatty XIII (Ac 1501)	Dublin	Ireland
2150		4th century	Ps. 2:1–8; 26:1–6, 8–14; 31:8–11 fragm.	Chester Beatty Library, P. Ch. Beatty XIV (Ac 1501[!])	Dublin	Ireland
2151		4th century	Ps. 1:1–4:2 (with gaps)	Chester Beatty Library, P. Ch. Beatty XV	Dublin	Ireland
2152		6th century	Ps. 5:12; 6:9–10 fragm.	ÖNB, P. Vindob. G 36022	Vienna	Austria
2153		6th century	Od. 8:57, 86–87 / quotes of NT	Coll. Lais, P. Lais	Rome	Italy
2154		IVE	Od. 8 fragm.	UML, P. Mich. 6427v	Ann Arbor	United States
2155		7th/8th century	Od. 5:9	UML, P. Mich. 1572	Ann Arbor	United States
2156		7th? century	Od. 4:8–10 fragm.	ÖNB, P. Vindob. G 36114	Vienna	Austria
2157		3rd/4th century	Ps. 21:20–28, 31–32; 22:1–6; 23:1 fragm.	Univ., IFC, PUG I 1	Genoa	Italy
2158		3rd century	Ps. 1:1–2 fragm.	Laurentian Library, PL Inv. II/34	Florence	Italy
2159		6th/7th century	Ps. 31:9–10 fragm.	ÖNB, P. Vindob. G 29491	Vienna	Austria
2160		2nd century	Ps. 14:3–5	SBO, P. Monts./II Inv. 2	Montserrat	
2161		7th/8th century	Ps. 106:35	UML, P. Mich. 6577	Ann Arbor	United States
2162		3rd century	Ps. 119:7	SBO, P. Monts./II Inv. 10	Montserrat	
2163		7th century	Ps. 98:4–5 fragm.	Sem. Pap., P. Palau Rib. Inv. 212v	Barcelona	Spain
2164		6th century	Ps. 129:2–6; 140:9–10; 141:2–3 fragm.	Ägyptisches Museum, P. 21270	Berlin	Germany
2165		4th century	Ps. 50:3–14 fragm.	Laurentian Library, PL Inv. II/39	Florence	Italy
2166		4th century	Ps. 90:1–6 fragm.	Laurentian Library, PL Inv. III/501	Florence	Italy
2167		5th century	Ps. 148:6–13 fragm.	Int. Pap., "G. Vitelli", PSI Inv. 1510r	Florence	Italy
2168		5th/6th century	Ps. 30:20–24; 43:2–6 fragm.	Univ., IFC, PUG I 3	Genoa	Italy
2169		4th century	148:7–8 fragm.	Univ. S. Cuore, P. Med. Inv. 71.86c	Milan	Italy
2170		5th century	Ps. 67:20; 92:1 fragm.	IfA, P.Colon. Inv. 2609	Cologne	Germany
2171		6th/7th century	Ps. 132	BL, P. Inv. 120 (3)	London	U. Kingdom
2172		4th/5th century	Ps. 15:4–11; 16:3–11 fragm.	BSB, P. gr. mon. 333	Munich	Germany
2173		6th/7th century	Ps. 91:1 fragm.	MMA, Inv. 14.1.481	New York	United States
2174		4th century	Ps. 92:1–5	Luwr, MND 552 E, F	Paris	France
2175		4th century	Ps. 146:1–147:1	Luwr, MND 552 I and H	Paris	France
2176		7th century	Ps. 28:1–29:7	Vatican Library, Vat. gr. 2657	Vatican City	
2177		4th century	Ps. 117:26–27 fragm.	private collections of Fackelmann, P. A. Fackelmann 10	Vienna	Austria
2178		4th/5th century	Ps. 118:22–40 fragm.	private collections of Fackelmann, P. A. Fackelmann 11	Vienna	Austria
2179		6th/7th century	Ps. 90:1–16 / quotes of NT	ÖNB, P. Vindob. G 348	Vienna	Austria
2180		6th century	Ps. 79:13–15; 80:11–13 fragm.	ÖNB, P. Vindob. G 3115	Vienna	Austria
2181		5th/6th century	Ps. 1:1–3	ÖNB, P. Vindob. G 25949	Vienna	Austria
2182		4th century	Ps. 77:48–52, 61–66 fragm.	ÖNB, P. Vindob. G 35781	Vienna	Austria
2183		7th century	Ps. 31:1–3 fragm.	ÖNB, P. Vindob. G 41050 Verso	Vienna	Austria
2184		6th century	Od. 3:3–7 fragm.	ÖNB, P. Vindob. G 40776 Verso	Vienna	Austria
2185		6th/7th century	Od. 12:3–5	Ägyptisches Museum, P. 17097	Berlin	Germany
2186		4th? century	Od. 8:51–52 fragm.	BSB, Gr. 610 Nr. 7	Munich	Germany
2187		4th/5th century	Od. 8:57, 59	CSIC, P.Matr. bibl. 2	Madrid	Spain
2188		7th/8th century	Od. 8:61–66 fragm.	ÖNB, P. Vindob. K 503 (KO 503)	Vienna	Austria
2189		7th century	Od. 8:77–88	ÖNB, P. Vindob. G 37 Verso	Vienna	Austria
2190		10th century	Od. 8:57–81	Baptistery	Kasr al-Wizz	
2191		Byzantium	Ps. 103:1–6	BL, EA 32884	London	U. Kingdom
2192		Byzantium	Ps. 117:26–27	BL, EA 32966	London	U. Kingdom
2193		7th/8th century	Ps. 80:4; 117:19–20	BL, EA 35123	London	U. Kingdom
2194		7th? century	Od. 8:57–88	Kopt. Mus., Ostr. 3151	Cairo	Egypt
2195		6th/7th century	Od. 8:73–76, 78 fragm.	ÖNB, P. Vindob. G 29523	Vienna	Austria
2196		6th century	Od. 8:52–56	ÖNB, P. Vindob. G 19934, Fragm. Ia	Vienna	Austria
2197		5th century	Ps. 50:17–20	SCL, P. Duk. Inv. 661v	Durham	United States
2198		3rd century	Ps. 88:4–8, 15–18	SCL, P. Duk. Inv. 740	Durham	United States
2199		4th century	Ps. 90	SCL, P. Duk. Inv. 778	Durham	United States
2200		5th/6th century	Ps. 80:2.4	IfP, P. Heid. Inv. G 1367 + 2259	Heidelberg	Germany
2201		7th/8th century	Ps. 135:1–18, 21–26	IfP, P. Heid. Inv. G 2104	Heidelberg	Germany
2202		Sixth century	Od. 4 (Hab 3):16–19; 5 (Is. 26):10–11, 14–15	IfP, P. Heid. Inv. G 2258 + 2748	Heidelberg	Germany
2203		5th/6th century	Ps. 36:25–26 fragm.	IfP, P. Heid. Inv. G 2260	Heidelberg	Germany
2204		6th century	Ps. 118:169–176; 133	YBR, P. CtYBR Inv. 488	New Haven	United States
2205		6th/7th century	Ps. 148:6–9; 149:1–4 fragm.	YBR, P. CtYBR Inv. 3082	New Haven	United States
2206		5th/6th? century	Ps. 150:3–6 fragm.	Col. Univ., P. Col. Inv. 97	New York	United States
2207		before 650	Ps. 88:4–5 / quotes of NT	MMA, Inv. 14.1.202	New York	United States
2208		6th/7th century	Od. 8:88; 9:46–47, 54–55	Sin.-Tr. S. 369, Abb. 9	Sinai	Egypt
2209		7th/8th century	Ps. 9:12–27 fragm.	ÖNB, P. Vindob. G 1128	Vienna	Austria
2210		6th/7th century	Ps. 1:3–4; 4:2 fragm.	ÖNB, P. Vindob. G 3089	Vienna	Austria
2211		6th/7th century	Ps. 40:3–6 fragm.	ÖNB, P. Vindob. G 14289	Vienna	Austria
2212		6th century	Ps. 23:1	ÖNB, P. Vindob. G 17087	Vienna	Austria
2213		7th century	Ps. 142:2–8, 10–12 fragm.	ÖNB, P. Vindob. G 17961	Vienna	Austria
2214		6th/7th century	Ps. 9:38–10:3 fragm.	ÖNB, P. Vindob. G 20541v	Vienna	Austria
2215		5th/6th century	Ps. 24:15; 49:1.2 fragm.	ÖNB, P. Vindob. G 29435	Vienna	Austria
2216		7th/8th century	Ps. 96:1; 117:2 fragm.	ÖNB, P. Vindob. G 35763	Vienna	Austria
2217		6th/7th century	Ps. 53:3–9 fragm.	ÖNB, P. Vindob. G 38624 + 41738	Vienna	Austria
2218		4th/5th century	Ps. 43:21–24; 43:27–44:2 fragm.	ÖNB, P. Vindob. G 39205	Vienna	Austria
2219		7th/8th century	Od. 1:10, 12, 15–16, 18; 5:9, 10, 12, 14–15, 17–18	ÖNB, P. Vindob. G 40404	Vienna	Austria
2220		5th/6th century	Od. 7:35–37, 43–44 fragm.	ÖNB, P. Vindob. G 41449	Vienna	Austria
2221		8th century	Ps. 91:13	ÖNB, P. Vindob. G 43283	Vienna	Austria
2222		5th/6th century	Ps. 117:5–6, 9; 22:1, 3	Ägyptisches Museum, P. 2791	Berlin	Germany
2223		6th century	Ps. 17:36–38; 49:3–4, 6–7	Univ. Statale, T. Mil. Vogl. inv. 2 and 3	Milan	Italy
2224		4th century	Ps. 12:3–5	Univ. Statale, T. Mil. Vogl. inv. 5	Milan	Italy
2225		6th century	Ps. 7:4–10 fragm.	IfA, P.Colon. Inv. 1612	Cologne	Germany
2226		4th/5th century	Ps. 30:3–4 fragm.	ÖNB, P. Vindob. G 40580	Vienna	Austria
2227	P. Oxyrhynchus 5101	50 to 150 CE	Psalms 26:9–14; 44:4–8; 47:13–15; 48:6–21; 49:2–16; 63:6–64:5	Sackler Library, 20 3B.36/J(4)B + 27 3B.38/N(1)B + 27 3B.41/J(1–2)c	Oxford	U. Kingdom

=== Part VIII: 3001-5000 ===
Symbol	Name	Date	Content	Institution	City	Country
3001		?	Cat. in Job	Chester Beatty Library, W 136	Dublin	Ireland
3002		13th century	Mac. III-IV	Cod. gr. 1342	Sinai	Egypt
3003		12th century	Cat. in. Job	Bodleian Library, Holkham Gr. 65	Oxford	U. Kingdom
3004		XVIE	Cat. in Job	Bibl. Univ., 32 (1-2-1)	Salamanca	Spain
3005		9th/10th century	Cat. in Job	Bibl. Durazzo - Giustiniani, A I. 10.	Genoa	Italy
3006		11th century	Cat. in Job	Cod. gr. 3	Sinai	Egypt
3007		1510	Cat. in Eccl., Cant and Job	Cod. gr. 311	Sinai	Egypt
3008		12th/13th century	Cat. in Job	Вατοπαιδίου, 590	Mount Athos	Greece
3009		16th century	Cat. in Jer., Ez., Hab., Is and in Dan.	Vatican Library, Pii. II 18	Vatican City	
3010		7th/8th century	Libri sap.	Nat. Bibl., Cod. C.V.25 c. 53, Palimpsest	Turin	Italy
3011		???	Libri sap.	Vallic. gr. E 21	Rome	Italy
3012		???	Libri sap.	Coll. gr. 7	Rome	Italy
3013		10th century	parts of Exod.-Lev.	Bodleian Library, T. 4. 21, Palimpsest	Oxford	U. Kingdom

=== Part X: 7001–xxxx ===
Symbol	Name	Date	Content	Institution	City	Country
7001		13th century	Ps.Od.	Patr.-Bibl., Καμαρ. 3	Istanbul	Turkey
7002		1506	Ps.Od.	Patr.-Bibl., Καμαρ. 71	Istanbul	Turkey
7003		1298	Ps.Od.	Patr.-Bibl., Καμαρ. 134	Istanbul	Turkey
7004		1597	Ps.Od.	Patr.-Bibl., Καμαρ. 135	Istanbul	Turkey
7005		1305	Ps.Od.	Patr.-Bibl., Τριάδος 19	Istanbul	Turkey
7006		16th century	Ps.Od.	Patr.-Bibl., Τριάδος 20	Istanbul	Turkey
7007		15th century	Od.Ps.	Patr.-Bibl., Τριάδος 21	Istanbul	Turkey
7008		1341	Ps.Od.	Patr.-Bibl., Τριάδος 22	Istanbul	Turkey
7009		???	Ps.Od.	Patr.-Bibl., Τριάδος 23	Istanbul	Turkey
7010		13th century	Ps.Od.	Patr.-Bibl., Θεολ. Σχολή 10	Istanbul	Turkey
7011		16th century	Ps.	Μονή Κορ. 36	Karditsa	Greece
7012		16th century	Ps.	Μονή Κορ. 44	Karditsa	Greece
7013		16th century	Ps.	Μονή Κορ. 57	Karditsa	Greece
7014		16th century	Ps.Od.	Kath.-Bibl., 15	Kastoria	Greece
7015		13th/14th century	Ps.<Od.>	Βιβλ. Μητρ., 37	Larnaca	Cyprus
7016		15th century	Ps.	Μ. Άγιας Τριάδος, 68	Meteora	Greece
7017		16th century	Ps.Od.	Μ. Άγιας Τριάδος, 77	Meteora	Greece
7018		16th century	Ps.Od.	Μ. Βαρλαάμ, 36	Meteora	Greece
7019		15th century	Ps.Od.	Μ. Βαρλαάμ, 37	Meteora	Greece
7020		16th century	Ps.Od.	Μ. Βαρλαάμ, 39	Meteora	Greece
7021		15th century	Ps.Od.	Μ. Βαρλαάμ, 40	Meteora	Greece
7022		16th century	Ps.Od.	Μ. Βαρλαάμ, 41	Meteora	Greece
7023		1546	Ps.Od.	Μ. Μεταμορφώσεως, 4	Meteora	Greece
7024		1348	Ps.Od.	Μ. Μεταμορφώσεως, 11	Meteora	Greece
7025		1524	Ps.Od.	Μ. Μεταμορφώσεως, 58	Meteora	Greece
7026		16th century	Ps.Od.	Μ. Μεταμορφώσεως, 61	Meteora	Greece
7027		14th century	Ps.Od.	Μ. Μεταμορφώσεως, 80	Meteora	Greece
7028		1516	Ps.Od.	Μ. Μεταμορφώσεως, 85	Meteora	Greece
7029		16th century	Ps.Od.	Μ. Μεταμορφώσεως, 90	Meteora	Greece
7030		13th century	Ps.Od.	Μ. Μεταμορφώσεως, 113	Meteora	Greece
7031		16th century	Ps.Od.	Μ. Μεταμορφώσεως, 120	Meteora	Greece
7032		15th century	Ps.	Μ. Μεταμορφώσεως, 159	Meteora	Greece
7033		16th century	Ps.	Μ. Μεταμορφώσεως, 170	Meteora	Greece
7034		16th century	Ps.Od.	Μ. Μεταμορφώσεως, 176	Meteora	Greece
7035		1523	Ps.Od.	Μ. Μεταμορφώσεως, 204	Meteora	Greece
7036		16th century	Ps.Od.	Μ. Μεταμορφώσεως, 211	Meteora	Greece
7037		16th century	Ps.Od.	Μ. Μεταμορφώσεως, 362	Meteora	Greece
7038		16th century	Ps.Od.	Μ. Μεταμορφώσεως, 453	Meteora	Greece
7039		16th century	Ps.Od.	Μ. Μεταμορφώσεως, 491	Meteora	Greece
7040	NLH Nr. II	14th century	Ps.Od.	Buchhdlg. Hiersemann, Cat. 1926. Nr. 33	?	
7041	NLH Nr. IV	13th? century	Ps.Od.	Sotheby's, Dec. 1980. lot 73	London	U. Kingdom
7042		13th/14th century	Ps.Od	Schøyen Coll., MS 1762	Oslo	Norway
7043		14th century	Ps.Od.	Bodleian Library, Holkham Gr. 1	Oxford	U. Kingdom
7044		15th century	Ps.Od.	Bodleian Library, Holkham Gr. 2	Oxford	U. Kingdom
7045		1474	Ps.Od.	Bodleian Library, Holkham Gr. 3	Oxford	U. Kingdom
7046		16th century	Cat. in Ps.	Bodleian Library, Holkham Gr. 45	Oxford	U. Kingdom
7047		13th century	Ps.Od.	Bibl. RAdW, 15	Petersburg	Russia
7048		13th century	Ps.Od.	Bibl. RAdW, 9	Petersburg	Russia
7049		14th century	Ps. fragm.	RBN Gr. 75	Petersburg	Russia
7050		14th century	Ps.Od.	Arch. Cap., E 16	Rome	Italy
7051		15th century	Cat. in Ps.Od	Vatican Library, Borgian., gr. 2–4	Vatican City	
7052		15th century	Ps.Od.	Bibl. Comm., Ms. X.VI.3	Siena	Italy
7053		15th century	Ps.	Cod. gr. 11	Sinai	Egypt
7054		16th century	Ps.Od	Cod. gr. 20	Sinai	Egypt
7055		Kamil XVI; CL 1638	Ps.Od	Cod. gr. 69	Sinai	Egypt
7056		CL XVI; Kamil XVI/XVII	Ps.Od	Cod. gr. 80	Sinai	Egypt
7057		Kamil 1503; CL n.a.	Ps.Od	Cod. gr. 100	Sinai	Egypt
7058		Ben. III 1600; Kamil/CL 1601	Ps.Od	Cod. gr. 2019	Sinai	Egypt
7059		1434	Ps.	Cod. gr. 2055	Sinai	Egypt
7060		1545	Ps.	Cod. gr. 2057	Sinai	Egypt
7061		16th century	Ps.Od	Cod. gr. 2061	Sinai	Egypt
7062		16th century	Ps.Od	Cod. gr. 2068	Sinai	Egypt
7063		16th century	Ps.Od	Cod. gr. 2069	Sinai	Egypt
7064		1242	Ps.	Cod. gr. 2123	Sinai	Egypt
7065		15th/16th century	Ps.Od	Cod. gr. 2130	Sinai	Egypt
7066		14th century	Ps.	Cod. gr. 2132	Sinai	Egypt
7067		1575	Ps.Od	Cod. gr. 2133	Sinai	Egypt
7068		16th century	Ps.	Cod. gr. 2150	Sinai	Egypt
7069		14th century	Ps.	Neue Slg., M 14	Sinai	Egypt
7070		13th century	Ps.Od.	Neue Slg., M 44	Sinai	Egypt
7071		14th century	Ps.	Neue Slg., X 8	Sinai	Egypt
7072		15th century	Ps.	Neue Slg., X 9	Sinai	Egypt
7073		13th/14th century	Ps.Od.	Neue Slg., X 11	Sinai	Egypt
7074		15th/16th century	Ps.	Neue Slg., X 15	Sinai	Egypt
7075		14th/15th century	Ps.	Neue Slg., X 39	Sinai	Egypt
7076		15th century	Ps.	Neue Slg., X 50	Sinai	Egypt
7077		14th century	Ps.	Neue Slg., X 68	Sinai	Egypt
7078		15th/16th century	Ps.	Neue Slg., X 80	Sinai	Egypt
7079		16th century	Ps.	Neue Slg., X 91	Sinai	Egypt
7080		16th century	Ps.	Neue Slg., X 106	Sinai	Egypt
7081		14th century	Ps.	Neue Slg., X 113	Sinai	Egypt
7082		16th century	Ps.Od.	Neue Slg., X 136	Sinai	Egypt
7083		15th century	Ps.Od.	Neue Slg., X 149	Sinai	Egypt
7084		13th/14th century	Ps.Od.	Neue Slg., X 163	Sinai	Egypt
7085		16th century	Ps.	Neue Slg., X 196	Sinai	Egypt
7086		15th century	Ps.Od.	Neue Slg., X 227	Sinai	Egypt
7087		15th/16th century	Ps.	Neue Slg., X 230	Sinai	Egypt
7088		14th/15th century	Ps.	Neue Slg., X 232	Sinai	Egypt
7089		15th century	Ps.	Neue Slg., X 266	Sinai	Egypt
7090		15th century	Od.	Neue Slg., X 282	Sinai	Egypt
7091		15th/16th century	Ps.Od.	St. Nikolaus, 6	Skamneli	
7092		13th/14th century	Ps.	Rivas Nr 9	Skiatos	Greece
7093		1509	Ps.Od.	IfK, 314 [28]	Sofia	Bulgaria
7094		1558	Ps.Od.	IfK, 321 [5]	Sofia	Bulgaria
7095		15th/16th century	Ps.Od.	IfK, 405 [1]	Sofia	Bulgaria
7096		???	Ps.	IfK, 412 [33]	Sofia	Bulgaria
7097		16th century	Ps.Od.	Nat.-Bibl., Ms. gr. 19	Sofia	Bulgaria
7098		14th century	Ps.Od.	Nat.-Bibl., Ms. gr. 20	Sofia	Bulgaria
7099		15th century	Ps.Od.	ZSBS, Dujčev 41	Sofia	Bulgaria
7100		14th century	Ps.Od.	ZSBS, Dujčev 44 (33)	Sofia	Bulgaria
7101		1525	Ps.Od.	ZSBS, Dujčev 47 (34)	Sofia	Bulgaria
7102		16th century	Ps.Od.	ZSBS, Dujčev 66	Sofia	Bulgaria
7103		14th century	Ps.Od.	ZSBS, Dujčev 173 (32)	Sofia	Bulgaria
7104		13th century	Ps.Od.	ZSBS, Dujčev 243 + 120	Sofia	Bulgaria
7105		14th century	Ps.Od.	ZSBS, Dujčev 382	Sofia	Bulgaria
7106		13th century	Ps.Od.	Μ. Βλατ., 41	Thessaloniki	Greece
7107		14th century	Ps.Od.	Μ. Βλατ., 47	Thessaloniki	Greece
7108		16th century	Ps.Od.	Kekelidze Inst., gr. 14	Tbilisi	Georgia
7109		15th century	Ps.	Bibl. Comm., 2325	Trento	Italy

== See also ==
- Biblical manuscripts
- List of the Dead Sea Scrolls
- List of Hebrew Bible manuscripts
- Vulgate manuscripts
