= Textual variants in the Epistle of James =

Textual variants in the Epistle of James are the subject of the study called textual criticism of the New Testament. Textual variants in manuscripts arise when a copyist makes deliberate or inadvertent alterations to a text that is being reproduced. An abbreviated list of textual variants in this particular book is given in this article below.

Most of the variations are not significant and some common alterations include the deletion, rearrangement, repetition, or replacement of one or more words when the copyist's eye returns to a similar word in the wrong location of the original text. If their eye skips to an earlier word, they may create a repetition (error of dittography). If their eye skips to a later word, they may create an omission. They may resort to performing a rearranging of words to retain the overall meaning without compromising the context. In other instances, the copyist may add text from memory from a similar or parallel text in another location. Otherwise, they may also replace some text of the original with an alternative reading. Spellings occasionally change. Synonyms may be substituted. A pronoun may be changed into a proper noun (such as "he said" becoming "Jesus said"). John Mill's 1707 Greek New Testament was estimated to contain some 30,000 variants in its accompanying textual apparatus which was based on "nearly 100 [Greek] manuscripts." Peter J. Gurry puts the number of non-spelling variants among New Testament manuscripts around 500,000, though he acknowledges his estimate is higher than all previous ones.

== Legend ==
A guide to the sigla (symbols and abbreviations) most frequently used in the body of this article.

General sigla
# beginning with 0: uncial
# not beginning with 0: minuscule
^{*} superscript: original reading
^{c} superscript: scribal correction
^{ms} superscript: individual manuscript
^{mss} superscript: multiple manuscripts
^{pt} superscript: partial attestation
^{vid} superscript: uncertain reading
arab: Arabic versions
arm: Armenian versions
𝔐 or Byz: Byzantine text-type
cop: Coptic versions

sa: Sahidic version
bo: Boharic version

eth: Ethiopic versions
ƒ: Greek manuscripts family
geo: Georgian versions
goth: Gothic versions
it: Italic/Vetus Latina
lat: most Italic and Vulgate
latt: all Italic and Vulgate
𝔓: papyrus
𝑙: individually numbered lectionary
Lect: most or all numbered lectionaries
parenthesized (): approximate reading
rell: all other extant manuscripts
slav: Slavic versions
syr: Syriac versions
vg: Latin Vulgate
ς: Textus Receptus

Uncial sigla
א: Codex Sinaiticus (01)
A: Codex Alexandrinus (02)
B: Codex Vaticanus (03)
C: Codex Ephraemi Rescriptus (04)
D^{ea}: Codex Bezae (05)
D^{p}: Codex Claromontanus (06)
K^{e}: Codex Cyprius (017)
K^{ap}: Codex Mosquensis I (018)
L^{e}: Codex Regius (New Testament) (019)
L^{ap}: Codex Angelicus (020)
P^{apr}: Codex Porphyrianus (025)
S: Codex Vaticanus 354 (028)
V: Codex Mosquensis II (031)
W: Codex Washingtonianus (032)
Z: Codex Dublinensis (035)
Γ: Codex Tischendorfianus IV (036)
Δ: Codex Sangallensis 48 (037)
Θ: Codex Koridethi (038)
Ξ: Codex Zacynthius (040)
Π: Codex Petropolitanus (New Testament) (041)
Φ: Codex Beratinus (043)
Ψ: Codex Athous Lavrensis (044)
Ω: Codex Athous Dionysiou (045)
ff^{1}: Codex Corbeiensis I
ff^{2}: Codex Corbeiensis II
g^{1}: Codex Sangermanensis I
k: Codex Bobiensis

Critical editions
T8th: Tischendorf's 8th Edition of Editio Octava Critica Maior
WH: Westcott and Hort (1881)
NA: Novum Testamentum Graece (Nestle–Aland)
UBS: United Bible Societies
ECM: Editio Critica Maior

Other notable manuscripts in the Epistle of James

- 𝔓^{20} Papyrus 20
- 𝔓^{23} Papyrus 23
- 𝔓^{74} Papyrus 74
- 𝔓^{100} Papyrus 100
- 048: Codex Vaticanus 2061 (048)
- 049: Uncial 049
- 056: Uncial 056
- 0246: Uncial 0246
- l: León palimpsest

== Textual variants ==
Textual variants in the Epistle of James

16 Textual variants in James 1

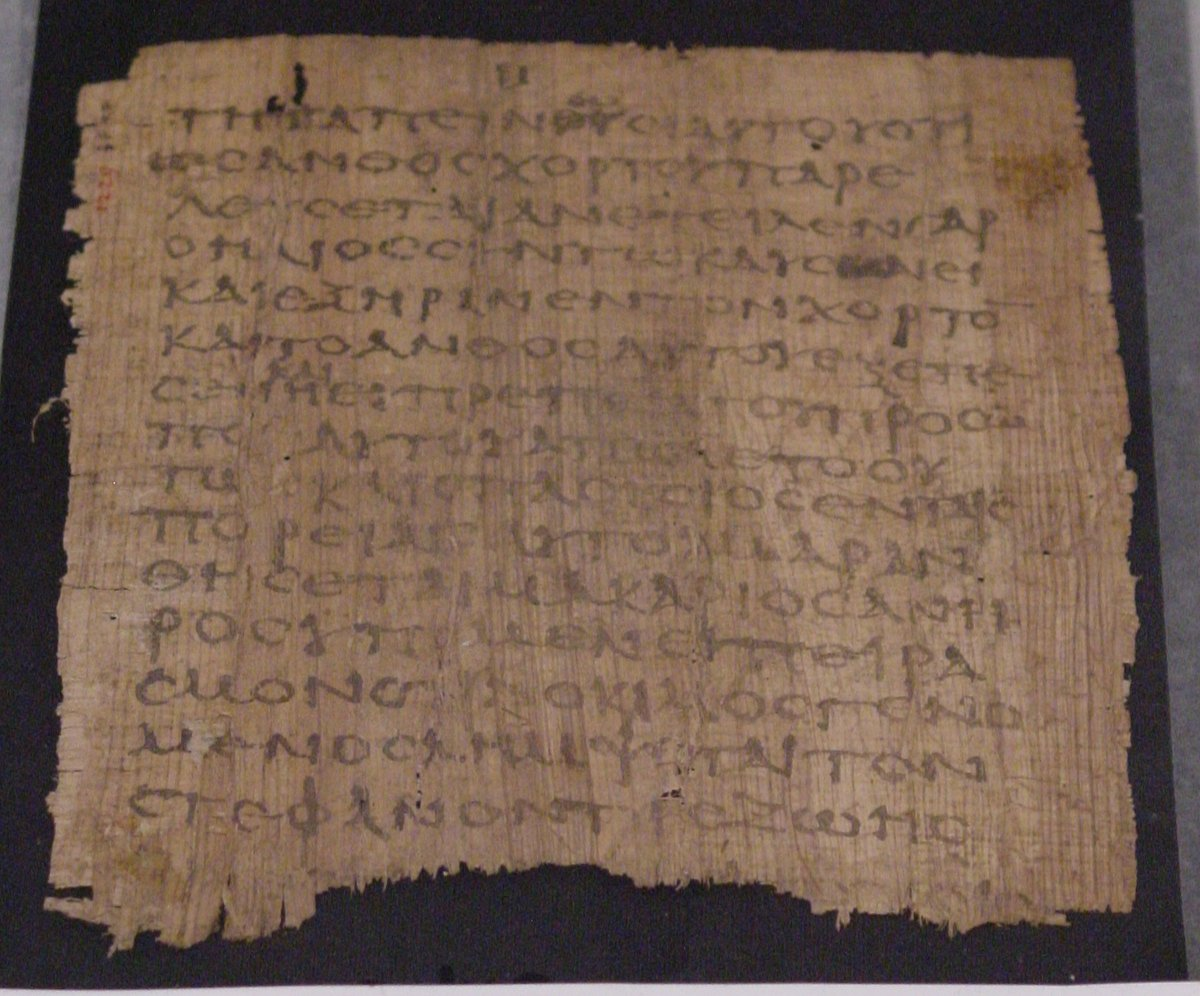
𝔓^{23} with text of James 1:10-12

Insciptio

Ιακωβου καθολικη επιστολη (Catholic Epistle of Jacob) — B^{c}
omit — א A B*

James 1:3

δοκιμον — 110 431 1241 Didymus^{pt}
δοκιμιον — 𝔓^{74}^{vid} א A B C K L P Ψ 049 056 0142 33 81 88 104 181 322 323 326 330 436 451 614 629 630 945 1067 1175 1243 1292 1409 1505 1611 1735 1739 1852 1877 2127 2138 2298 2344 2412 2464 2495 𝔐 Lect lat syr arm eth geo slav Didymus^{pt} Cyril

James 1:5

ουκ — 𝔐
μη — א A B C

James 1:9

ο αδελφος ο ταπεινος — 𝔐
αδελφος ο ταπεινος — B Ψ
ο ταπεινος αδελφος — 720
omit — 𝔓^{74}

James 1:12

ο κυριος (the Lord) — P 0246 𝔐
κυριος (Lord) — C
ο θεος (God) — 33^{vid} 323 945 1739 2816 vg syr^{p}
omitted — א A B Ψ 81 it^{ff} cop

James 1:12

επηγγειλατο — 𝔓^{23} א A B Ψ 81 206* 2344 it^{ff} cop arm geo Didymus^{pt}
επηγγειλατο ο θεος — 33^{vid} 322 323 463 547 945 1175 1241 1243 1735 1739 1852 2298 2464 2492 l596 lat syr^{p,pal} eth Athanasius Didymus^{pt} Chromatius Cyril John-Damascus
επηγγειλατο κυριος — C 794 1829 𝑙^{593} 𝑙^{680}
επηγγειλατο ο κυριος — K L P 049 056 0142 0246 88 104 181 326 330 436 451 614 629 630 1067 1292 1409 1505 1611 1877 2127 2138 2412 2495 𝔐 Lect syr^{h} (slav) Ps-Oecumenius Theophylact

James 1:13

απο — A B C 𝔐
υπο — א

James 1:17

παραλλαγη η τροπης αποσκιασμα — א^{2} A C K L P 049 056 0142 81 88 104 181 322 323 326 330 436 451 629 630 945 1067 1175 1243 1292 1409 1611 1735 1739 1852 1877 2127 2298 2344 2464 2492 𝔐 Lect lat syr arm Athanasius Cyril-Jerusalem Didymus Jerome John-Damascus
παραλλαγη ουδε η τροπης αποσκιασμα — Ψ
παραλλαγη η ορ η τροπης αποσκιασματος — א* B
παραλλαγη η τροπη αποσκιασματος — 614 1505 2412 2495 (slav)
παραλλαγης η τροπης αποσκιασματος — 𝔓^{23}
αποσκιασμα η τροπη η παραλλαγη — cop^{sa}
παραλλαγη η τροπη η τροπης αποσκιασμα ουδε μεχρι υπονοιας τινος υποβολη αποσκιασματος — 876 1518 1610 1765 2138
παραλλαγη η ροπης αποσκιασμα — Augustine Ferrandus Primasius
παραλλαγη η ροπη αποσκιασματος — it^{ff}

James 1:19

ιστε αδελφοι μου αγαπητοι ιστω δε — א*
ιστε αδελφοι μου αγαπητοι εστω — 436 1067 1175 1243 syr^{h^{mg}} arm
ιστε αδελφοι μου αγαπητοι εστω δε — א^{2} B C (81) 88 945 1739 2344 lat cop^{bo^{mss},(ach)} geo
ιστε δε αδελφοι μου αγαπητοι και εστως δε — A*
ιστε δε αδελφοι μου αγαπητοι και εστω δε — A^{c}
ιστε γαρ αδελφοι μου αγαπητοι εστω δε — it^{c}
ιστε δε αδελφοι μου αγαπητοι εστω δε — 𝔓^{74}^{vid} 2464 vg^{mss} cop^{sa,bo^{mss}}
ωστε αδελφοι μου αγαπητοι εστω δε — P* 1852
ωστε αδελφοι μου αγαπητοι εστω — K L P^{c} Ψ 049 056 0142 0246^{vid} 104 181 322 323 326 330 451 614 630 1241 1292 1409 1505 1611 1735 1877 2127 2138 2298 2412 2492 2495 𝔐 syr^{(p),h} slav Ps-Oecumenius Theophylact
και νυν αδελφοι ημων εστω — eth

James 1:20

ουκ εργαζεται — א A B C^{c} K Ψ 81
ου κατεργαζεται — C* P 0246 1175 1243 1739 1852 𝔐

James 1:22

νομου (of the law) — C^{c} 88 621 1067 1852
λογου (of the word) — rell

James 1:22

ακροαται μονον — B 1852
μονον ακροαται — 𝔓^{74} א A C P Ψ 81 1175 1243 1739 𝔐

James 1:25

ουκ — א A B C
ουτος ουκ — 𝔐

James 1:26

ειναι — א A B C
ειναι εν υμιν — 𝔐

James 1:27

τω — A B C
omit — א 𝔐

James 1:27

ασπιλον εαυτον τηρειν — א (A) B C K P 049 056 0142 33 81 88 104 181 326 330 (436) 451 629 630 945 1241 1739 1877 2127 2492 𝔐 Lect latt syr^{p} cop arm (eth)
ασπιλους εαυτους τηρειτε — 614 1505 2412 2495 syr^{(h)}
υπερασπιζειν αυτους — 𝔓^{74}

14 Textual variants in James 2

James 2:3

ειπητε — א A B C
ειπητε αυτω — 𝔐

James 2:3

η καθου ωδε — cop^{sa}
η καθου εκει — B 945 1175 1241 1243 1739 1852 2298 2492 𝑙^{809} it^{ff}
η εκει καθου — arm
εκει και καθου — C*
εκει και καθου ωδε — C^{c}
εκει η καθου — A Ψ 33 81 614 630 1292 1505 1611 2138 2412 2495 𝑙^{591} lat syr^{h} geo Augustine Cyril Hesychius
εκει η καθου ωδε — 𝔓^{74}^{vid} א K L P 049 056 0142 88 104 181 322 323 326 330 436 451 629 1067 1409 1735 1877 2127 2344 2464 𝔐 Lect syr^{p} cop^{bo} eth slav Ps-Oecumenius Theophylact

James 2:4

ου — א A B^{c} C 33 81 614 630 945 1175 1241 1243 1739 2495
ουχι — Ψ
και ου — P 307 𝔐
και — 322 323
omit — B* 1852 (vg)

James 2:5

τω κοσμω — א A B C
του κοσμου — 𝔐

James 2:10

τηρηση πταιση — א B C
πληρωσει πταιση — A
τηρησει πταισει — 𝔐

James 2:11

μοιχευεις φονευεις — א A B C
μοιχευσεις φονευσεις — 𝔐

James 2:11

κατακαυχαται ελεος — א B
κκατακαυχασθω δε ελεος — A
κατακαυχαται ελεον — C 𝔐

James 2:15

λειπομενοι — א B C
λειπομενοι ωσιν — A 𝔐

James 2:18

χωρις των εργων καγω σοι δειξω — א B
χωρις των εργων καγω δειξω σοι — A
χωρις των εργων σου καγω δειξω σοι — C
εκ των εργων σου καγω δειξω σοι — 𝔐

James 2:18

πιστιν — א B C
πιστιν μου — A 𝔐

James 2:19

εις εστιν ο θεος — 𝔓^{74} א A 1735 2464 𝑙^{596} it^{ar,c,dem,div,p,s,z} vg syr^{p} cop^{sa,bo} arm eth geo Augustine Cyril^{pt} Salvian^{pt} Faustus Caesarius^{pt} Anastasius^{pt}
εις εστιν θεος — 945 1241 1739 2298
εις θεος εστιν — B 614 630 1292 1505 1611 1852 1875 2138 2412 2495 Theophylact
εις ο εστιν θεος — C 33^{vid} 81 1175 1243 2344 2492 syr^{h}
ο θεος εις εστιν — K^{c} L 049 056 0142 88 104 181 322 323 326 436 629 1067 1409 1877 𝔐 Lect vg^{ms} slav Didymus Cyril^{pt} Salvian^{pt} Caesarius^{pt} Ps-Oecumenius
θεος εις εστιν — 330 451 2127
εις ο θεος — Cyril
εστιν θεος — Ψ Ps-Athanasius
εις ο θεος — it^{ff} vg^{mss} Cyril^{pt}

James 2:20

αργη — B C* 322 323 945 1175 1243 1739 it^{ar,c,dem,div,s,z} vg^{mss} cop^{sa} arm Augustine
νεκρα — א A C^{c} K L P Ψ 049 056 0142 33 81 88 104 181 326 330 436 451 614 629 630 1067 1241 1292 1409 1505 1611 1735 1852 1877 2127 2138 2298 2344 2464 2492 2495 𝔐 Lect it^{p} vg^{mss} syr cop^{bo} eth slav Didymus Cyril Salvian Faustus Ps-Athanasius Ps-Oecumenius Cassiodorus
κενη — 𝔓^{74} it^{ff}

James 2:24

ορατε — א A B C
ορατε τοινυν — 𝔐

James 2:25

αγγελους — 𝔓^{54}^{vid} 𝔓^{74} א A B K P Ψ 33^{vid} 81 322 323 436 1067 1175 1243 1292 1409 1505 1611 1735 1852 2138 2344 𝔐 𝑙^{147} 𝑙^{590} 𝑙^{591} 𝑙^{603} 𝑙^{680} 𝑙^{883} 𝑙^{1159} 𝑙^{1178} it^{ar,s,t} vg syr^{h}
αγγελους του Ισραηλ — 61 syr^{h^{mg}}
αγγελους τους κατασκοπους — 𝑙^{1154}
κατασκοπους — C K^{mg} L 945 1241 1739 2298 2464 Lect it^{ff} syr^{p} cop arm eth geo slav

19 Textual variants in James 3

James 3:2

δυνατος — A B 𝔐
δυναμενος — א

James 3:3

ει δε — א^{2} A B* K L Ψ 049 33 104 181 326 330 436 451 1067 1243 1409 1505 1611 1735 1852 2344 2464 2492 𝑙^{590} 𝑙^{592} 𝑙^{680} 𝑙^{883} 𝑙^{884} 𝑙^{1154} lat cop^{bo} geo Ps-Oecumenius John-Damascus
ιδε — C P 056 0142 81 88 322 323 614 629 630 945 1175 1241 1292 1505 1739 2127 2138 2298 2412 2495 𝔐 Lect syr^{h} cop^{sa} arm slav^{(ms)} Ps-Ambrose Theophylact
ει δε γαρ (ιδε γαρ) — א* syr^{p}
ιδου — 36 483 1874 1877
quare ergo — it^{m}

James 3:3

βαλλομεν εις — א B C
βαλλομεν προς — A 𝔐

James 3:4

ανεμων σκληρων — א B C K P 056 0142 81 307 1175 1243 1852
σκληρων ανεμων — A L Ψ 049 1739 𝔐

James 3:4

οπου — א B
οπου αν — A C 𝔐

James 3:4

βουλεται — א B
βουληται — A C 𝔐

James 3:5

μεγαλα αυχει — A B C
μεγαλαυχει — 𝔓^{20} א 𝔐

James 3:5

ηλικον — א B
ολιγον — A^{vid} C 𝔐

James 3:5

αδικιας η γλωσσα — 𝔓^{20} א A B C
αδικιας ουτως η γλωσσα — 𝔐

James 3:8

δαμασαι δυναται ανθρωπων — 𝔓^{20}^{vid} B C 1739
δυναται δαμασαι ανθρωπων — א A K P Ψ 049 81 307 1175 1852
δυναται ανθρωπων δαμασαι — 𝔐

James 3:8

ακαταστατον — א A B K P 1175 1243 1735 1739* 2298 it^{ar,ff,t} vg syr^{p} cop Jerome^{pt}
ακατασχετον — C L Ψ 81 322 323 436 945 (1067) 1241 1292 1409 1505 1611 1739^{c} 1852 2138 2344 2464 𝔐 Lect syr^{h} eth geo slav Epiphanius Jerome^{pt} Cyril Flavian-Constantinople Speculum Cassiodorus John-Damascus

James 3:9

κυριον — 𝔓^{20} א A B C P Ψ 33 81 623 945 1175 1241 1735 1739 1852 it^{ar,ff,t} vg^{mss} syr^{p} cop^{bo^{mss}} arm Cyril
θεον — K L 322 323 436 1067 1243 1292 1409 1505 1611 2138 2298 2344 2464 𝔐 Lect it^{s} vg^{mss} syr^{h} cop^{sa,bo^{mss},ach} geo slav Epiphanius Jerome Augustine John-Damascus

James 3:12

ουδε αλυκον — 88
ουτε αλυκον — A B C* 1175 1243 1852 2492 syr^{h} cop^{sa} arm (John-Damascus)
ουτως αλυκον — 2492^{mg}
ουτως ουδε αλυκον — א 81 322 323 1739 2344 latt syr^{p} cop^{bo} (eth) geo Cyril
ουτως ουτε αλυκον και — 1735
ουτως ουτε αλυκον — C^{c} Ψ
ουτως και αλυκον — 1241
ουτως ουδε ουδε αλυκον — 33
ουτως ουδεμια ποα αλυκον και — 1067
ουτως ουδεμια πηγη αλυκον και — K L 049 056 0142 104 181 326 330 436 451 614 629 630 917 945 1292 1409 1611 1877 2127 2298 2412 𝔐 Lect syr^{h^{mg}} slav Ps-Oecumenius Theophylact
ουδεμια πηγη αλυκον και — 1505 2492
ουτως ουτε πηγη αλυκον και — 2464
ουτως ουτε μια πηγη αλυκον και — P 1505 2138

James 3:14

εριθειαν — 𝔐
ερειθειαν — 𝔓^{100}

James 3:14

ψευδεσθε — 𝔐
ψευδευσθε — 𝔓^{100}

James 3:15

επιγειος — 𝔐
επιγιος — 𝔓^{100}

James 3:16

ακαταστασια — 𝔐
ακαστασια — 𝔓^{100}

James 3:17

αδιακριτος — א A B C
αδιακριτος και — 𝔓^{100} K L 049 69 322 323 𝔐

James 3:18

δικαιοσυνης — A B C
της δικαιοσυνης — 𝔐
ο δικαιοσυνης — א

25 Textual variants in James 4

James 4:1

ποθεν μαχαι — א (A) B C
μαχαι — 𝔐

James 4:1

υμιν — 𝔐
υμειν — 𝔓^{100}

James 4:2

ουκ εχετε δια — 𝔓^{100} A B 𝔐
και ουκ εχετε δια — א

James 4:3

αιτεισθε — 𝔐
αιτειτε — 𝔓^{100} 69 631

James 4:4

μοιχαλιδες — 𝔓^{100} א* A B 33 81 1175* 1241 1739 1852 latt syr^{p} cop arm eth geo Augustine
μοιχοι και μοιχαλιδες — א^{c} K L P Ψ 049 056 0142 88 104 181 (322) 323 326 330 436 451 614 629^{c} 630 945 1067 1175^{c} 1243 1292 1409 1505 1611 1735 1877 2127 2138 2298 2344 2464 2492 2495 𝔐 Lect syr^{h} slav Ps-Oecumenius Theophylact
μοιχοι — 629*^{vid}

James 4:4

εαν — א B
αν — A 𝔐

James 4:5

κατωκισεν — 𝔓^{74} א B Ψ 049 104 226 241 462 547 807 1241 1739 1877* slav
κατωκησεν — K L P 056 0142 32 33 88 181 322 323 326 330 436 451 614 629 630 945 1067 1243 1292 1409 1505 1611 1735 1852 1877^{c} 2127 2138 2298 2344 2412 2492 2495 𝔐 Lect latt syr^{(p),h} cop arm eth geo Nilus Ps-Oecumenius Theophylact
κατωκεισεν — A 81 1175 2464 𝑙^{680}

James 4:7

δε — א A B 𝔐^{pt}
omit — 𝔐^{pt}

James 4:9

μετατραπητω — 𝔓^{100} B P 614 1241 1739
μεταστραφητω — א A 𝔐

James 4:9

κατηφειαν — 𝔐
κατηφιαν — 𝔓^{100}

James 4:11

η — 𝔓^{100} א A B
και — 𝔐

James 4:11

κρινων — 𝔐
κρεινων — 𝔓^{100}

James 4:11

νομον — 𝔐
νον — 𝔓^{100}

James 4:12

νομοθετης — 𝔓^{74} 𝔓^{100} B P 1175 1241*^{vid} 1243 1852 arm geo Cyril^{pt}
ο νομοθετης — א A K L Ψ 33 81 322 323 436 945 1067 1241^{c, vid} 1292 1409 1505 1611 1735 1739 2138 2298 2344 2464 𝔐 Lect cop eth Didymus Cyril^{pt} John-Damascus

James 4:12

και κριτης — א A B
omit — 𝔐

James 4:12

ο κρινων — 𝔓^{100} א A B
ος κρινεις — 𝔐

James 4:12

πλησιον — א A B
ετερον — 𝔐

James 4:13

η — א B
και — A 𝔐

James 4:13

πορευσομεθα... ποιησομεν... εμπορευσομεθα και κερδησομεν — 𝔓^{100}^{vid} B P 323 1739
πορευσομεθα... ποιησωμεν... εμπορευσομεθα και κερδησομεν — א
πορευσωμεθα... ποιησωμεν... εμπορευσομεθα και κερδησομεν — A
πορευσωμεθα... ποιησωμεν... εμπορευσωμεθα και κερδησωμεν — 𝔐

James 4:13

ενιαυτον — א B
ενιαυτον ενα — A 𝔐

James 4:14

το της αυριον — א K L Ψ 049 056 0142 104 181 322 323 326 330 436 451 629 1067 1409 1735 1877 2127 2464 𝔐 Lect lat syr^{p} arm (eth) Ps-Oecumenius Theophylact
ττα της αυριον — A P 33 81 614 630 945 1175 1241 1243 1292 1505 1611 1739 1852 2138 2298 2344 2412 2492 2495 syr^{h}
της αυριον — B it^{ff,l} Jerome

James 4:14

ποια — א* B 614 1505 1611 1852 2138 2412 2495 it^{l} syr^{h} cop^{bo^{mss}} arm
ποια γαρ — 𝔓^{74} 𝔓^{100} א^{2} A K L P Ψ 049 056 0142 33 81 88 104 181 322 323 326 330 436 451 629 630 945 1067 1175 1241 1243 1292 1409 1735 1739 1877 2127 2298 2344 2464 2492 𝔐 Lect lat syr^{p} cop^{sa,bo^{mss}} slav Jerome Augustine Ps-Oecumenius Theophylact
ποια δε — it^{ff} eth geo

James 4:14

ατμις γαρ εστε η — 81 104 614 1243 1292 1852 2412 2495 syr^{h} Jerome Ps-Oecumenius
ατμις γαρ εστε — B 322 323 945 1175 1739 2298
ατμις γαρ εσται — P 88 1241 𝑙^{680*} 𝑙^{884}
ατμις εσται η — A it^{ar,c,dem,div,p,s,z}
ατμις εστιν η — 33 1735 2344 vg cop
ως ατμις γαρ εσται η — it^{l} (arm) (eth)
ατμις γαρ εσται η — K Ψ 049 181 326 436 1067 1505 1611 2127 2138 2464 2495 𝔐^{pt} Lect
ατμις γαρ εστιν η — L 056 0142 330 451 629 630 1409 1877 𝔐^{pt} 𝑙^{592} 𝑙^{883} 𝑙^{921} 𝑙^{1159} 𝑙^{1441} it^{ff} slav (Augustine) Bede John-Damascus John-Damascus Theophylact
ατμις γαρ εστιν — 𝑙^{596}
η — א

James 4:14

και — א A B
δε και — 𝔐

James 4:15

ζησομεν και ποιησομεν — א A B
ζησωμεν και ποιησωμεν — 𝔐

21 Textual variants in James 5

James 5:4

αφυστερημενος — א B*
απεστερημενος — A B^{c} P Ψ (33) (81) 322 323 945 1067 1175 1241 1243 1292 1409 1505 1611 1735 1739 1852 2138 2298 2344 2464 𝔐 Lect lat arm (eth) geo slav^{ms} Didymus Cyril John-Damascus
αποστερημενος — K L

James 5:5

υμων — א (A) B
υμων ως — 𝔐

James 5:7

αυτω — א A B
αυτον — 𝔐

James 5:7

εως — A B 𝔐
εως αν — א

James 5:7

λαβη — 𝔓^{74} B 048 945 1241 1739 2298 lat cop^{sa} arm geo
λαβη υετον — A K L P Ψ 049 056 0142 33 81 88 104 181 322 323 326 330 451 614 629 1243 1292 1505 1611 1735 1852 1877 2127 2138 2344 2412 2464 2495 𝔐 Lect vg^{mss} syr^{p,h} geo^{ms} slav Ps-Oecumenius Theophylact
υετον λαβη — 436 1067 1409
λαβη καρπον — א^{c} 255 398 1175 it^{ff} syr^{h^{mg}} cop^{(bo)} Faustus Cassiodorus Antiochus
λαβη καρπον τον — א*

James 5:7

προιμον — א A B
πρωιμον — 𝔐

James 5:9

αδελφοι κατ’ αλληλων — B
αδελφοι μου κατ’ αλληλων — A
κατ’ αλληλων αδελφοι — (א) 𝔐

James 5:10

αδελφοι της κακοπαθιας — (A) B
αδελφοι μου της κακοπαθειας — 𝔐
της κακοπαθιας αδελφοι μου — א

James 5:10

εν — (א) B P 307 1243
omit — A K L Ψ 049 056 0142 81 𝔐

James 5:11

υπομειναντας — א A B
υπομενοντας — 𝔐

James 5:11

ειδετε — א B
ιδετε — A 𝔐

James 5:11

ο κυριος — א A (B)
omit — 𝔐

James 5:12

υπο κρισιν — א A B
εις υποκρισιν — 𝔐

James 5:14

αλειψαντες αυτον — א A (Ψ) 048^{vid} 𝔐
αλειψαντες — B P 1243 it^{ff} vg^{ms} cop^{sa^{mss}}

James 5:14

του κυριου — א K L P 33 322 323 436 945 1175 1241 1243 1292 1409 1505 1611 1735 1739 1852 2138 2298 2344 2464 𝔐 Lect geo (eth) Chrysostom Cyril John-Damascus^{pt}
κυριου — A Ψ 81 1067 𝑙^{751} 𝑙^{921} arm John-Damascus^{pt}
του κυριου or κυριου — lat syr slav Origen^{lat} Hesychius
του κυριου Ιησου — 𝑙^{1356}
Ιησου Χριστου — 6
omit — B

James 5:16

ουν αλληλοις τας αμαρτιας — א A B
αλληλοις τα παραπτωματα — 𝔐

James 5:16

ευχεσθε — א K P Ψ 056 0142 𝔐
προσευχεσθε — A 048^{vid}
προσευχεσθαι — B

James 5:19

μου — א A B
omit — 𝔐

James 5:20

γινωσκετω οτι — א A K L P 049 056 0142 81 88 104 181 322 323 326 330 436 451 614 629 630 945 1067 1175 1241 1243 1292 1409 1611 1735 1739 1846 1852 1877 2127 2298 2344 2412 2464 2492 𝔐 Lect lat syr^{p} cop^{bo^{mss}} arm eth (geo) slav Didymus
γινωσκετε οτι — B 69 1505 1518 2138 2495 syr^{h}
οτι — Ψ Origen^{lat}
omit — 𝔓^{74} it^{ff} cop^{sa}

James 5:20

αυτου εκ θανατου — א A P 048^{vid} 33 436 1067 1409 1735 1739 2298 2344 2464 lat syr copbo arm (eth) Didymus Cyril
εκ θανατου αυτου — 𝔓^{74} B 614 1108 1292 1611 1852 2138 (2412) it^{ff}
εκ θανατου — K L Ψ 049 056 0142 81 88 104 181 322 323 326 330 451 629 630 945 1175 1241 1243 1505 1846 1852 1877 2127 2492 2495 𝔐 Lect cop^{sa} Origen^{lat} Ps-Oecumenius John-Damascus Theophylact
αυτου — Ambrosiaster

James 5:20

αμαρτιων — 𝔐
αμαρτιων αμην — 181 378 614 1518 1765 1898 syr^{h}
αμαρτιων οτι αυτω η δοξα εις τους αιωνας αμην — 330

== See also ==
- Alexandrian text-type
- Biblical inerrancy
- Byzantine text-type
- Caesarean text-type
- Categories of New Testament manuscripts
- Comparison of codices Sinaiticus and Vaticanus
- List of New Testament verses not included in modern English translations
- Textual variants in the New Testament
- Western text-type
