= P. Lond.Lit.207 =

P. Lond.Lit.207 (BL P.Inv.Nr.230, TM 62310 / LDAB 3473) is a Greek fragment of a Septuagint manuscript written on papyrus in codex form. This manuscript discovered at Fayum, contains parts of the Book of Psalms. Palaeographycally it is dated to late third century or early fourth century (250 - 350 CE).

According to Don C. Barker, this papyrus proposes evidence about the origin of nomina sacra:

Why is θεός, which is always treated in Christian texts as a nomen sacrum, written uncontracted in P.Lond.Lit. 207 by the first hand, whilst κύριος is consistently written in a contracted form using the first and last letters? Perhaps the answer to the question is to be found in the Hebrew word that κύριος in the Greek Old Testament translates, the Tetragrammaton, which is the personal name of the Hebrew deity. Judging by the various ways the Tetragrammaton was written in the text of the Greek Old Testament, it appears that scribes struggled with the problem of how to present it. Some left a space in which the Hebrew word was to be written later; others used paleo-Hebrew writing, whilst others wrote the Greek letters Ι.Α (sic) or ΠΙΠΙ and it seems that in some cases κύριος was used instead of the Tetragrammaton. But why write κύριος in a contracted form using the first and last letters as it is in P.Lond.Lit. 207. (…) Did a scribe or scribes use this contracted form for personal names to signal to the reader that κύριος, when so contracted, is being used for the personal name of the Hebrew deity and so distinguish it from its usual non-personal use as master or lord? If so, could it be that P.Lond.Lit. 207, in contracting κύριος in this Semitic fashion, preserves a very early use of this custom? This wou explain why θεός is consistently left uncontracted in P.Lond.Lit. 207.

The manuscript is kept London, British Library (Brit. Mus. P. Inv. 230).
