= P91 =

P91 may refer to:

- HMAS Aware (P 91), a patrol boat of the Royal Australian Navy
- Papyrus 91, a biblical manuscript
- Ruger P91, a pistol
- P91, a state regional road in Latvia
