= Papyrus Chester Beatty VIII =

The Papyrus Chester Beatty VIII (also signed as P.Chest.Beatty VIII, VH 304, Rahlfs 966, LDAB 3084) is a fragment of a septuagint manuscript that contains parts of the biblical Book of Jeremiah. Palaeographically it has been dated to the late second, early third century CE.

== Description ==
It was written in codex form on papyrus, in 48 lines per page. The text contains Jeremiah 4:30–5:1; 5:9–13; 5:13–14; 5:23–24. Turner dated the manuscript to the fourth century CE.

This manuscript contains the contraction κ̅ς̅ to represent the title κύριος, written in nomina sacra.

=== Location ===
Currently is saved in Dublin, at the Chester Beatty Library.

== Sources ==
- Hurtado, Larry W. (2006). The Earliest Christian Artifacts: Manuscripts and Christian Origins. Wm. B. Eerdmans Publishing. ISBN 9780802828958.
- Tov, Emanuel (2018). Scribal Practices and Approaches Reflected in the Texts Found in the Judean Desert. Studies on the Texts of the Desert of Judah. Vol. 54. BRILL. ISBN 9789047414346.
- CSNTM. "Manuscript Rahlfs 966". The Center for the Study of New Testament Manuscripts.
