= Jamesian =

Jamesian can refer to:

- the ambiguous, subjective characteristics of the fiction of Henry James
- the Jamesian Theory of Self developed by Henry James' brother, philosopher William James
- a narrative with similarities to the ghost stories of writer M. R. James (1862–1936)
- a follower of James the Just and the teachings of the Letter of James
