= P. Baden 56b =

The Papyrus Baden 56b (also AT15, AT 15, P. Baden IV 56b, P. Heid. Gr. 8 , Papyrus Heidelberg Greek 8, Rahlfs 970) is an early septuagint manuscript with the text of Exod 8. It was written in papyrus and koine Greek. Paleographically it has been dated to the 2nd century CE.

== Description ==
The manuscript contains Exod 8:1-5 (fol. 1 v); 8:8-12, 14-16 (fol. 1 r).

=== Nomina sacra ===
This manuscript already includes the word κ̅ς̅ to refer to God, written with the abbreviations known as nomina sacra.

== Sources ==
- Meyer, Anthony R. (2022-09-09). "ΚΥΡΙΟΣ in the Second Temple Period". Naming God in Early Judaism. Studies in Cultural Contexts of the Bible. Vol. 2. Brill. pp. 236–260. doi:10.30965/9783657703500_011. ISBN 9783657703500.
- Tov, Emanuel (2003). "The Indication of Small Sense Units Verses". In Baasten, Martin F. J.; Van Peursen, W. Th. (eds.). Hamlet on a Hill: Semitic and Greek Studies Presented to Professor T. Muraoka on the Occasion of His Sixty-fifth Birthday. Peeters Publishers. ISBN 9789042912151.
