= P.Deissmann =

Septuagint manuscript

The Papyrus Deissmann (also named as P.Coll Horsley, P.Horsley, LDAB 3095, TM 61938, vHTR 30a, Rahlfs 865) is a septuagint manuscript written in papyrus that contains parts of the Book of Exodus. Using the study of comparative writing styles (palaeography), it has been dated to 3rd-century. Currently is kept at Armidale, Private collection, Australia.

== Description ==
The manuscript comes from Egypt and contains Exodus 4:2-6, 14–17. It has been written in codex form (10 x 12–15 cm) with small cursive script in 20-22 lines per page.

=== Nomina sacra ===
This manuscript has nomina sacra κ̅ς̅ to represent the title Κύριος.

== Sources ==
- Hurtado, Larry W. (2006-11-02). The Earliest Christian Artifacts: Manuscripts and Christian Origins. Wm. B. Eerdmans Publishing. ISBN 9780802828958.
- Mugridge, Alan (2016-07-19). Copying Early Christian Texts: A study of scribal practice. Wissenschaftliche Untersuchungen zum Neuen Testament. Vol. 362. Mohr Siebeck. ISBN 9783161546884.
- Tov, Emanuel (2018). "Scribal Features of Early Witnesses of Greek Scripture". Scribal Practices and Approaches Reflected in the Texts Found in the Judean Desert. Studies on the Texts of the Desert of Judah. Vol. 54. Brill. pp. 303–315. doi:10.1163/9789047414346_014. ISBN 9789047414346.
