= Papyrus 111 =

- New Testament manuscript
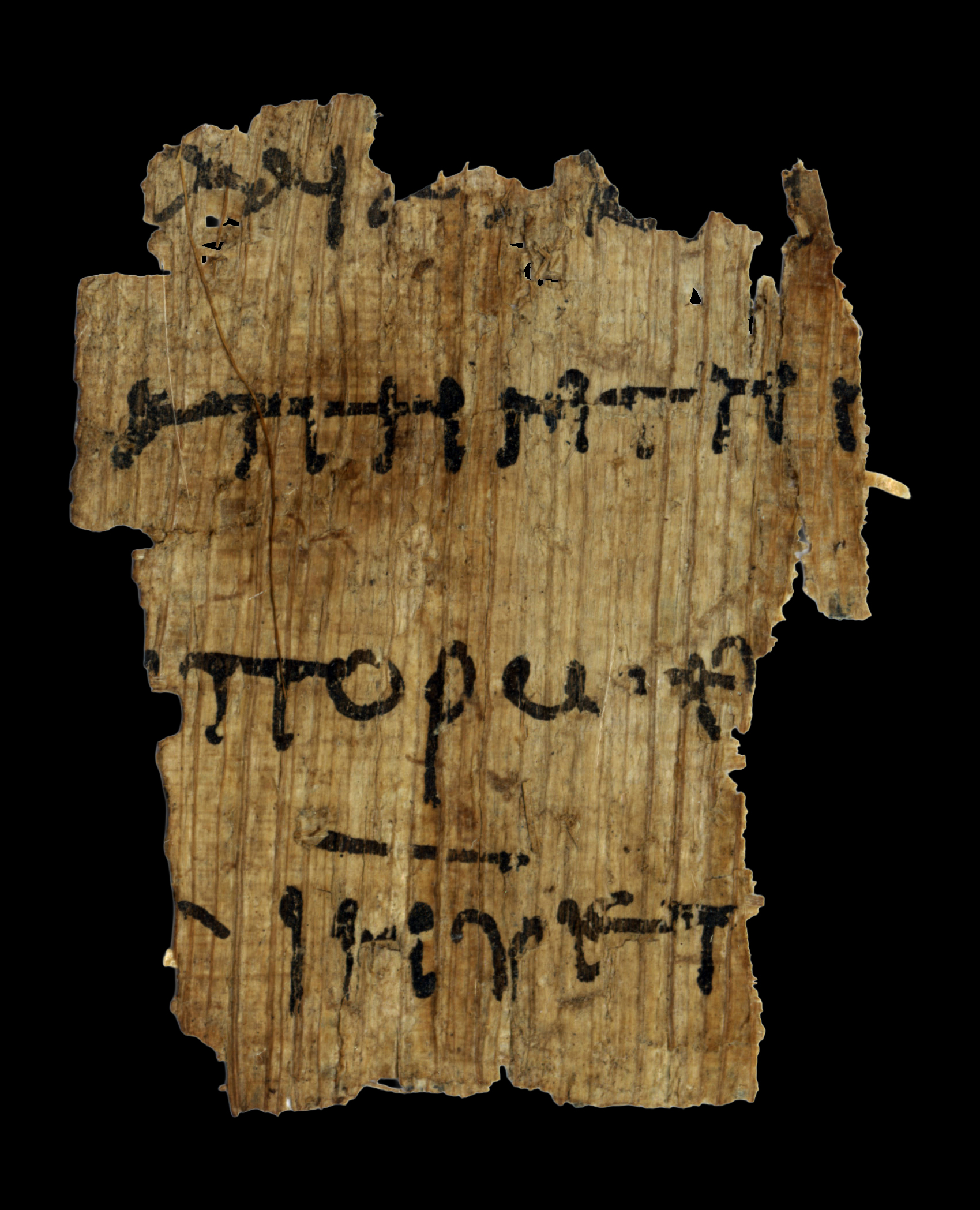
- Recto, Luke 17:11-13
- Name: P. Oxy. 4495
- Sign: 𝔓^{111}
- Text: Luke 17:11–13,22-23
- Date: 3rd century
- Script: Greek
- Found: Oxyrhynchus, Egypt
- Now at: Sackler Library
- Cite: W. E. H. Cockle, OP LXVI (1999), pp. 19–20
- Size: [22] x [12] cm
- Type: Alexandrian text-type
- Category: none
- Note: Concurs with 𝔓^{75}

Papyrus 111 is a copy of the New Testament in Greek. It is a papyrus manuscript of the Gospel of Luke, containing verses 17:11-13 & 17:22-23 in a fragmentary condition. It is designated by the siglum 𝔓^{111} in the Gregory-Aland numbering of New Testament manuscripts. Using the study of comparative writing styles (palaeography), it has been assigned by the INTF to the 3rd century CE. Papyrologist Philip Comfort dates the manuscript to the first half of the 3rd century CE. The manuscript is currently housed at the Sackler Library (Papyrology Rooms, P. Oxy. 4495) at Oxford.

== Description ==
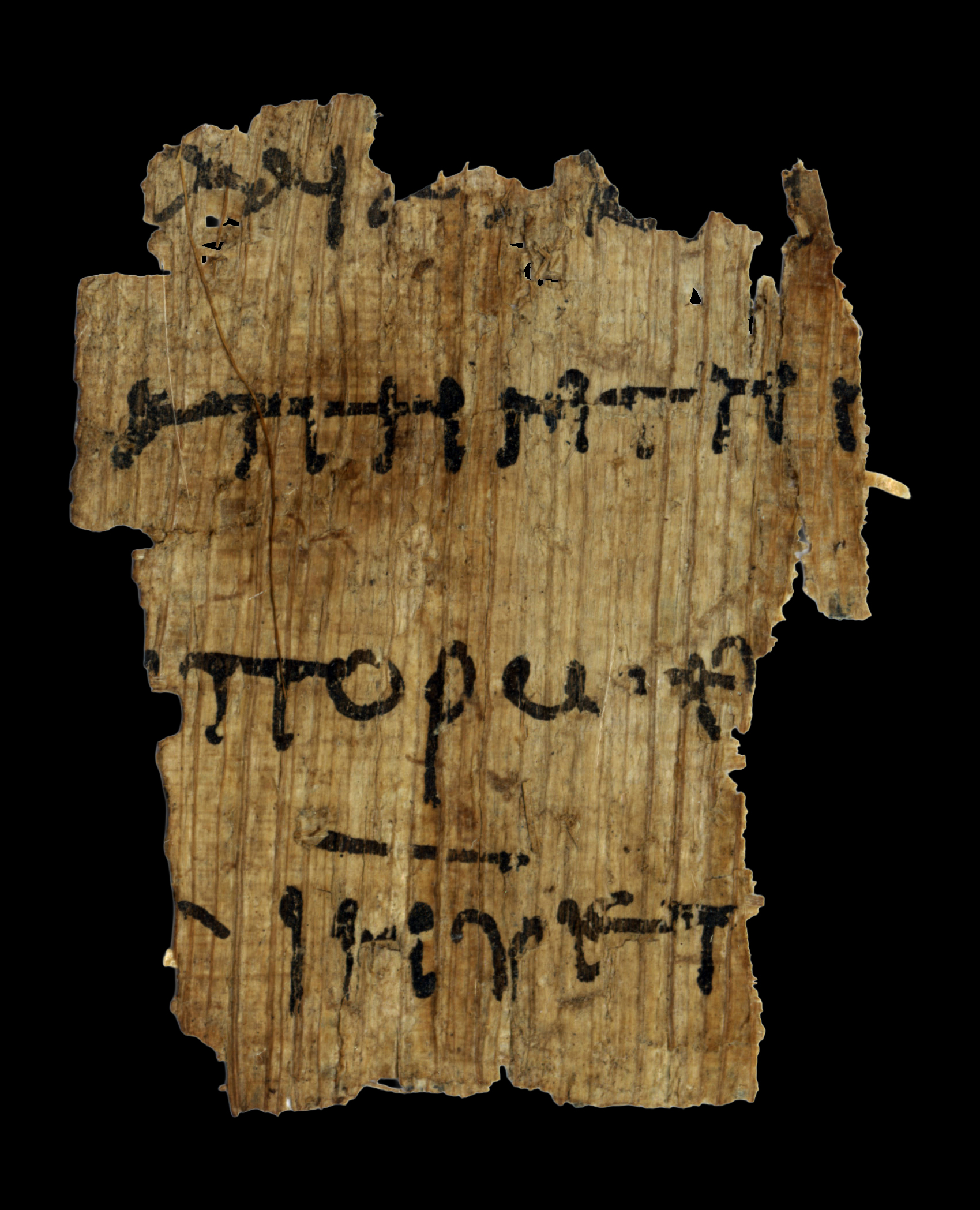
Verso, Luke 17:11-13

Due to the fragmentary nature of the manuscript, it's not possible to determine the manuscript page's original width and length. From the extant text, Comfort estimates around 21-22 lines a page. The extant text conforms with 𝔓^{75}. The handwriting script is representative of the Documentary style.

The manuscript has only one nomen sacrum extant: ι̅η̅υ̅ for Ιησους (Jesus).

Some notable readings

Below taken from the Nestle-Aland 27th Edition Apparatus

Luke 17:12(1)

απηντησαν : 𝔓^{111} 𝔓^{75} A B W Ψ Majority of manuscripts
υπηντησαν : א L N Θ ƒ^{13} 579 892 1241 2542 al

Luke 17:12(2)

πορωθεν : 𝔓^{111}
πορρωθεν : 𝔓^{75} א^{b} A B W Ψ Majority of manuscripts

Luke 17:22

του επιθυμησαι : 𝔓^{111} D 157 ƒ^{13}
οτε επιθυμησεται : א A B^{c}
οτε επιθυμησηται : B*
οτε επιθυμησητε : 𝔓^{75} Majority of manuscripts

== See also ==
- List of New Testament papyri
- Oxyrhynchus Papyri
