= Papyrus 23 =

Papyrus 𝔓^{23}
- New Testament manuscript
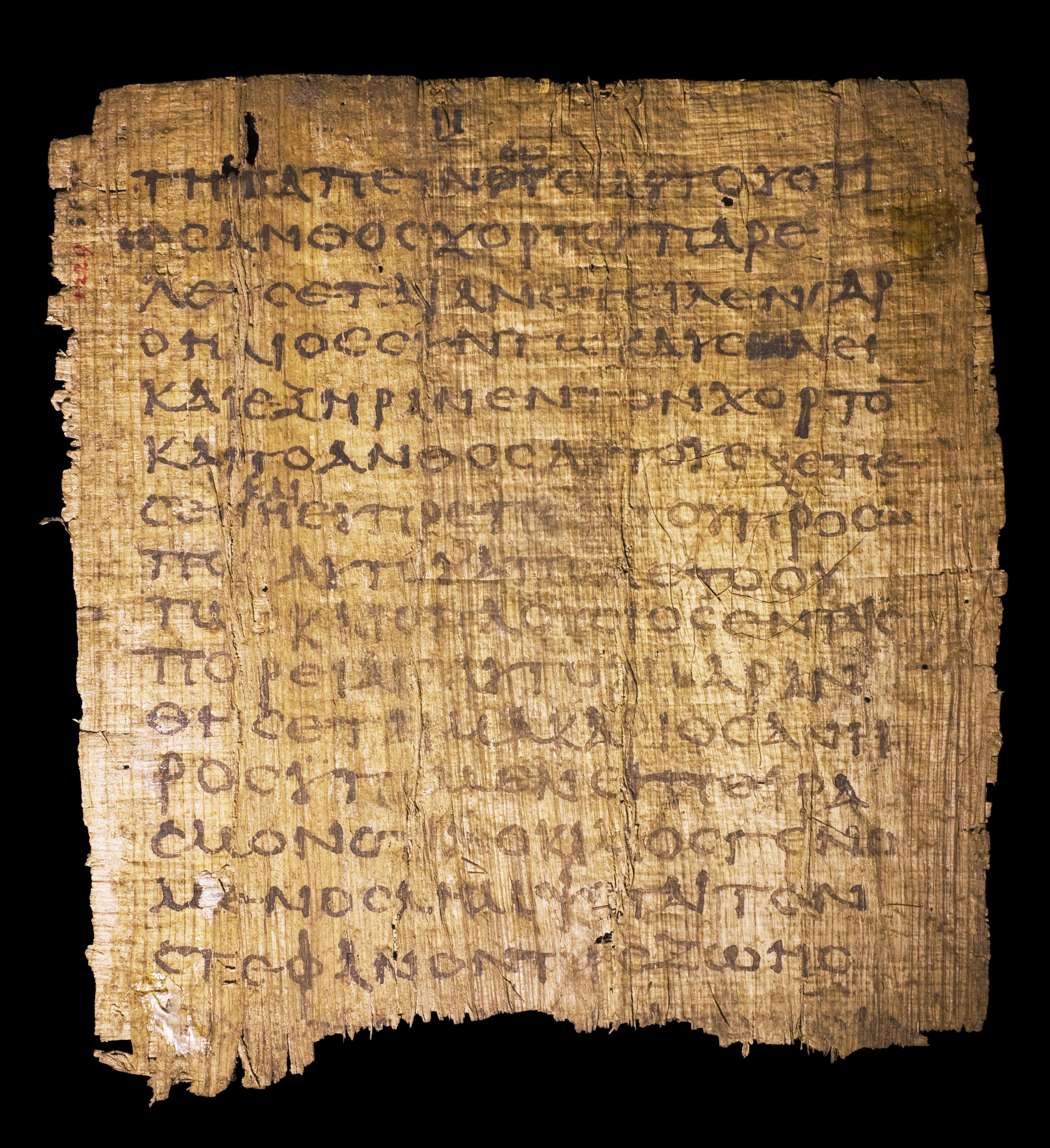
- Verso James 1:10–12
- Name: P. Oxy. X 1229
- Text: James 1 †
- Date: 3rd century
- Script: Greek
- Found: Egypt
- Now at: University of Illinois
- Cite: B. P. Grenfell & A. S. Hunt, Oxyrynchus Papyri X, (London 1914), pp. 16-18
- Size: 12.1 x 11.2 cm
- Type: Alexandrian text-type
- Category: I

Papyrus 23, also known as P. Oxy X 1229, is an early copy of the New Testament in Greek. It is a papyrus manuscript of the Epistle of James, surviving in a fragmentary condition containing only James 1:10-12,15-18. It is designated by the siglum 𝔓^{23} in the Gregory-Aland numbering of New Testament manuscripts. Using the study of comparative writing styles (palaeography), it has been assigned to the early 3rd century.

== Description ==
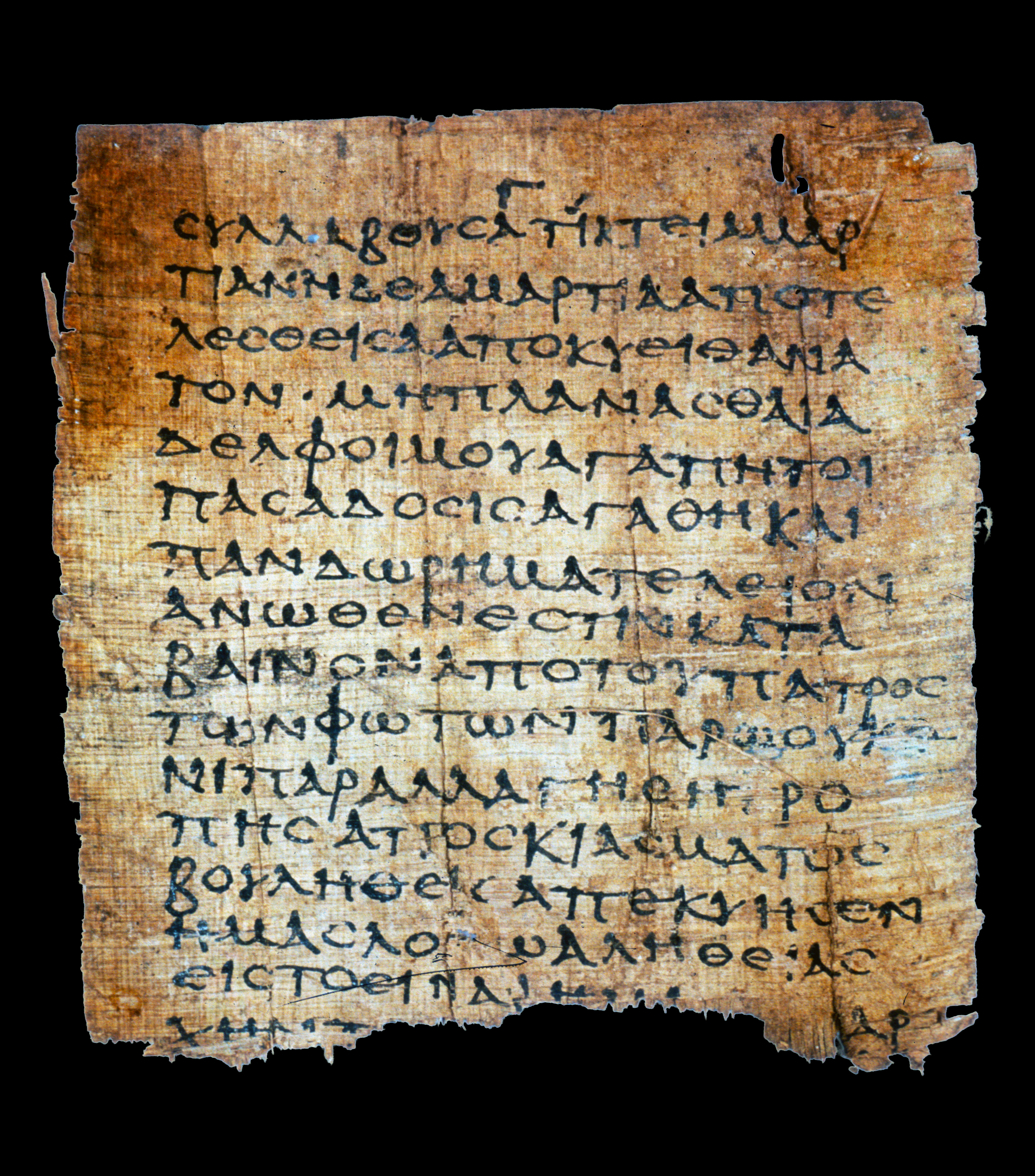
Recto James 1:15-18

The Nomina sacra are written fully, abbreviations are used only at the end of lines. There has been noticed the occurrence of the ungrammatical αποσκιασματος found also in Codex Sinaiticus and Vaticanus in James 1:17. It is currently housed in the Spurlock Museum at the University of Illinois (G. P. 1229) in Urbana, Illinois.

== Text ==
The Greek text of this codex is considered a representative of the Alexandrian text-type (or rather proto-Alexandrian). Biblical scholar Kurt Aland placed it in Category I of his New Testament manuscript classification system. The manuscript displays the greatest textual agreement with codices Sinaticus (א), Alexandrinus, and Ephraemi, which represent the best text of the Catholic epistles, and then with Codex Vaticanus and 𝔓^{74}.

== See also ==
- List of New Testament papyri
