= Uncial 0246 =

- New Testament manuscript
- Text: James 1:12-14,19-21
- Date: 6th century
- Script: Greek
- Now at: Westminster College, Cambridge
- Size: 29 cm by 20 cm
- Type: Byzantine text-type
- Category: V

Uncial 0246 (in the Gregory-Aland numbering), is a Greek uncial manuscript of the New Testament. Paleographically it has been assigned to the 6th century.

== Description ==
The codex contains a small part of the Epistle of James 1:12-14,19-21, on 1 parchment leaf (29 cm by 20 cm). Written in one columns per page, 27 lines per page, in uncial letters. Survived leaf is not complete.

It is a palimpsest, the upper text has not survived to the present day (ink vanished).

Currently it is dated by the INTF to the 6th century.

== Location ==
Currently the codex is housed at Westminster College in Cambridge.

== Text ==
The Greek text of this codex is a representative of the Byzantine text-type. Aland placed it in Category V.

== See also ==
- List of New Testament uncials
- Textual criticism
