= Papyrus 20 =

Fragment of the Epistle of James

Papyrus 𝔓^{20}
- New Testament manuscript
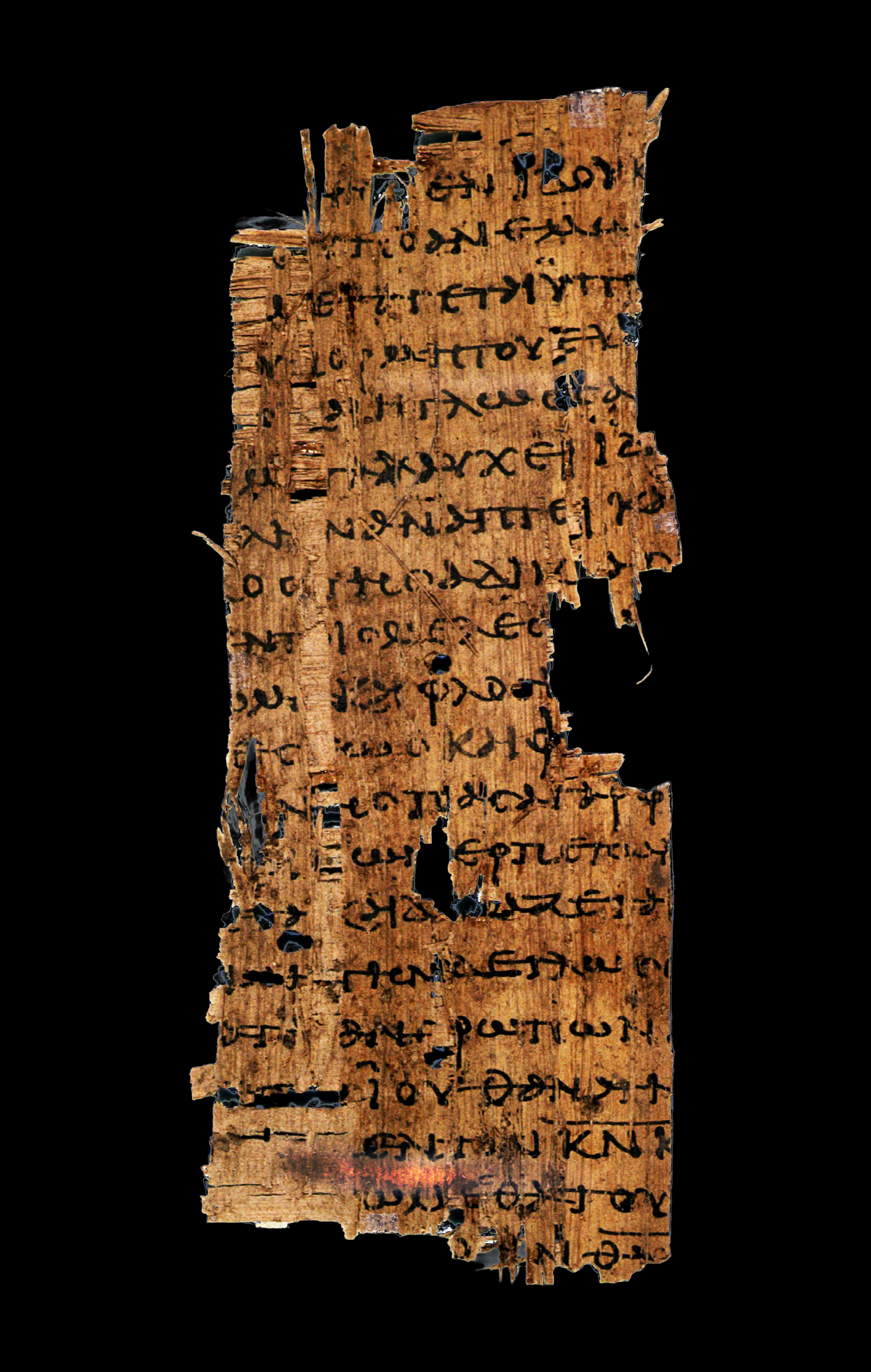
- Epistle of James 3:3–3:9 on verso side
- Name: P. Oxy. 1171
- Text: Epistle of James 2–3 †
- Date: 3rd century
- Script: Greek
- Found: Egypt
- Now at: Princeton University Library
- Cite: B. P. Grenfell & A. S. Hunt, Oxyrhynchus Papyri IX, (London 1912), pp. 9-11
- Size: 11.5 by 4.5 cm
- Type: Alexandrian text-type
- Category: I

Papyrus 20 (in the Gregory-Aland numbering), designated by 𝔓^{20}, is an early copy of the New Testament in Greek. It is a papyrus manuscript of the Epistle of James, but it only contains verses 2:19–3:9. The manuscript has been paleographically assigned to the early 3rd century.

== Description ==
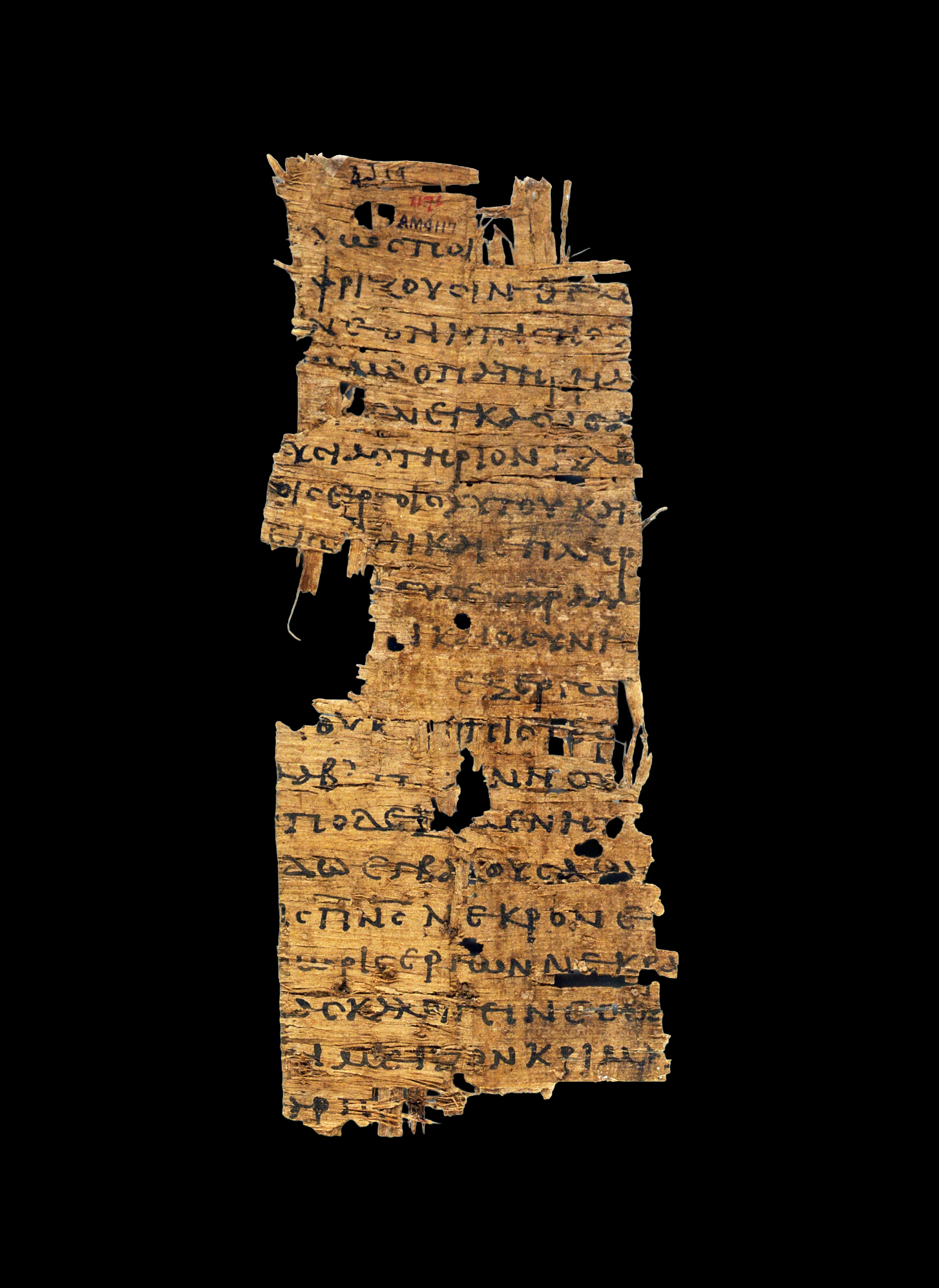
Recto James 2,19–3, 2

The original size of the leaves was 17 by 12 cm.

The text is neatly written in upright semi-cursive letters. The main Nomina Sacra are used, but πατηρ/pater/father and ανθρωπος/anthropos/man are written out in full.

The Greek text of this codex is representative of the Alexandrian text-type (rather proto-Alexandrian). Aland placed it in Category I. This manuscript shows the greatest agreement with Codex Sinaiticus and Vaticanus, but not with codices Ephraemi, Regius and other late Alexandrian manuscripts.

Philip Comfort has conjectured that the scribe who wrote 𝔓^{20} was also the same scribe who wrote 𝔓^{27}, where the Greek letters α, β, δ, ε, λ, ι, μ, ν, ο, π, ρ, σ, ψ, υ, φ, ω are formed identically in both manuscripts.

It is currently housed at the Princeton University Library (AM 4117) in Princeton.

== See also ==
- James 2; 3
- List of New Testament papyri
- Princeton Papyri
