= Papyrus 91 =

- New Testament manuscript
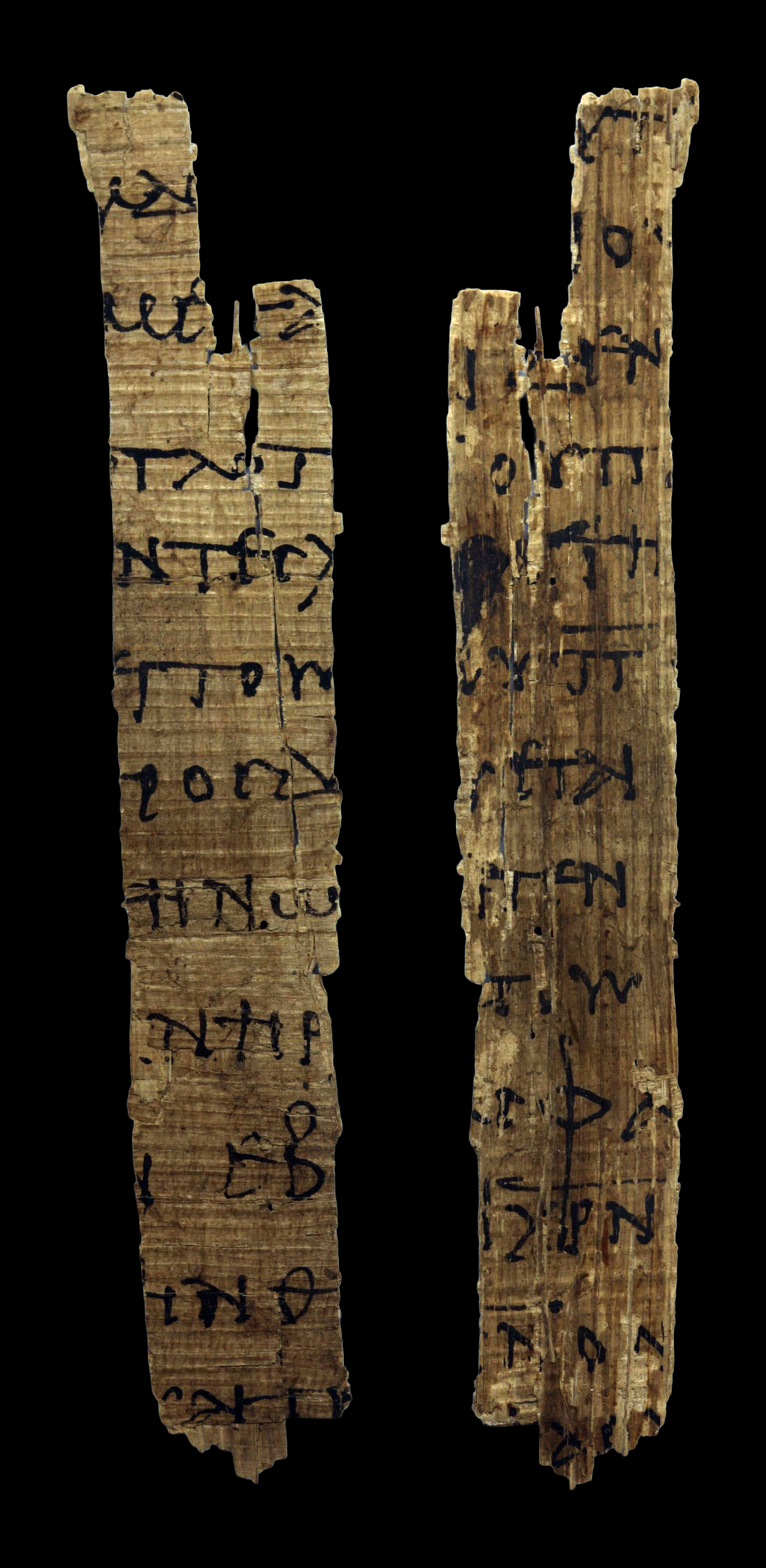
- Sydney fragment, Acts 2:30-37 (right) and 2:46-3:2 (left)
- Name: P. Mil. Vogl. P. Macquarie
- Sign: 𝔓^{91}
- Text: Acts 2:30-37; 2:46-3:2
- Date: 3rd century
- Script: Greek
- Now at: University of Milan; Macquarie University, Sydney
- Cite: C. Galazzi, P. Mil. Vogl. Inv. 1224 NT, Act. 2,30-37 e 2,46-3,2, Bulletin of the American Society of Papyrologists 19 (1982), pp. 39-45.
- Size: 16 x 12 cm
- Type: Alexandrian text-type
- Category: I (?)

Papyrus 91 (in the Gregory-Aland numbering, designated as 𝔓^{91}), is an early copy of the New Testament in Greek. It is a papyrus manuscript of the Acts of Apostles. The surviving texts of Acts are verses 2:30-37; 2:46-3:2. The manuscript paleographically has been assigned to the middle of the 3rd century.

== Text ==
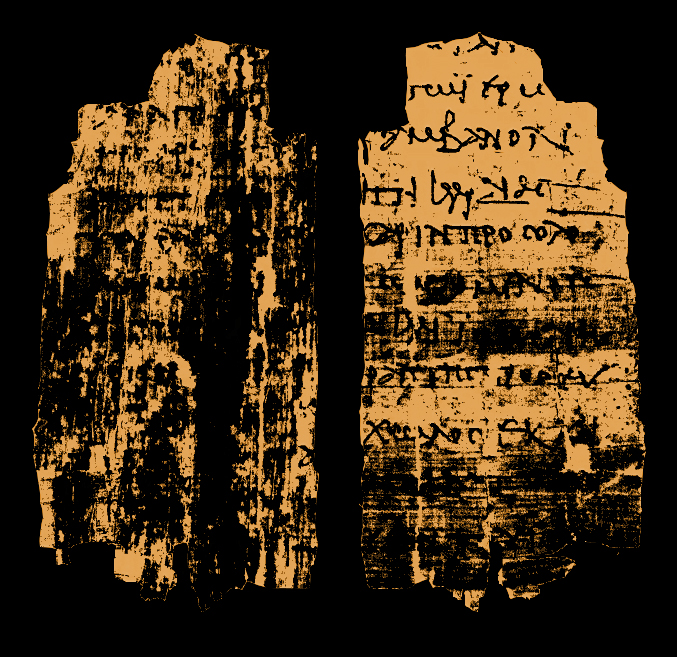
Milan fragment, Acts 2:30-37 (left) and 2:46-3:2 (right)

The Greek text of this manuscript is a representative of the Alexandrian text-type, Comfort ascribed it as proto-Alexandrian, though the extant portion is too fragmentary for certainty. It has not been placed yet in Aland's Categories of New Testament manuscripts.

== Location ==
The larger portion of 𝔓^{91} is housed at the Instituto di Papyrologia (P. Mil. Vofl. Inv. 1224) at the Universita Degli Studi di Milano. The smaller portion is housed at the Ancient History Documentary Research Centre at Macquarie University (Inv. 360) in Sydney.

== Textual Variants ==
- 2:31: omits του χ̅ρ̅υ̅ (of the Christ/Messiah (χ̅ρ̅υ̅ being a Nomina Sacra)).
- 2:32: According to the reconstruction of Philip Comfort and David Barrett, omits εσμεν (are).
- 2:33: The scribe misspells ακουετε (you hear) as ακουεται (he heard) due to ε and αι being pronounced similarly when spoken.
- 2:36: The scribe misspells Ισραηλ (Israel) as Ισστραηλ.
- 2:36: και (and) is omitted from after οτι (because/that).
- 2:36: Swaps κ̅ν̅ αυτον και χ̅ρ̅ν̅ (Master him and Christ/Messiah (Nomina Sacra)) to χ̅ρ̅ν̅ [αυτον και κ̅ν̅] (Christ/Messiah him and Master (Nomina Sacra))
- 2:46: The scribe misspells μετελαμβανον (they were sharing) as μεταλαμβανον (they are sharing).
- 2:46: The scribe misspells αφελοτητι (simplicity) through dittography as [αφελ]οτλοτητι.

== See also ==
- List of New Testament papyri
