= Epistle of James =

Book of the New Testament

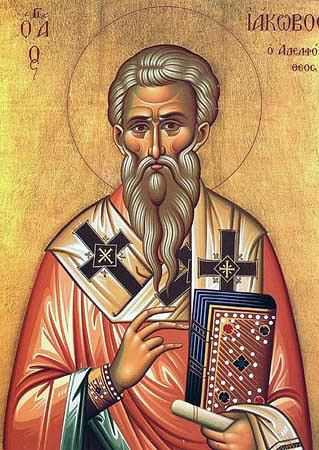
Image of St. James

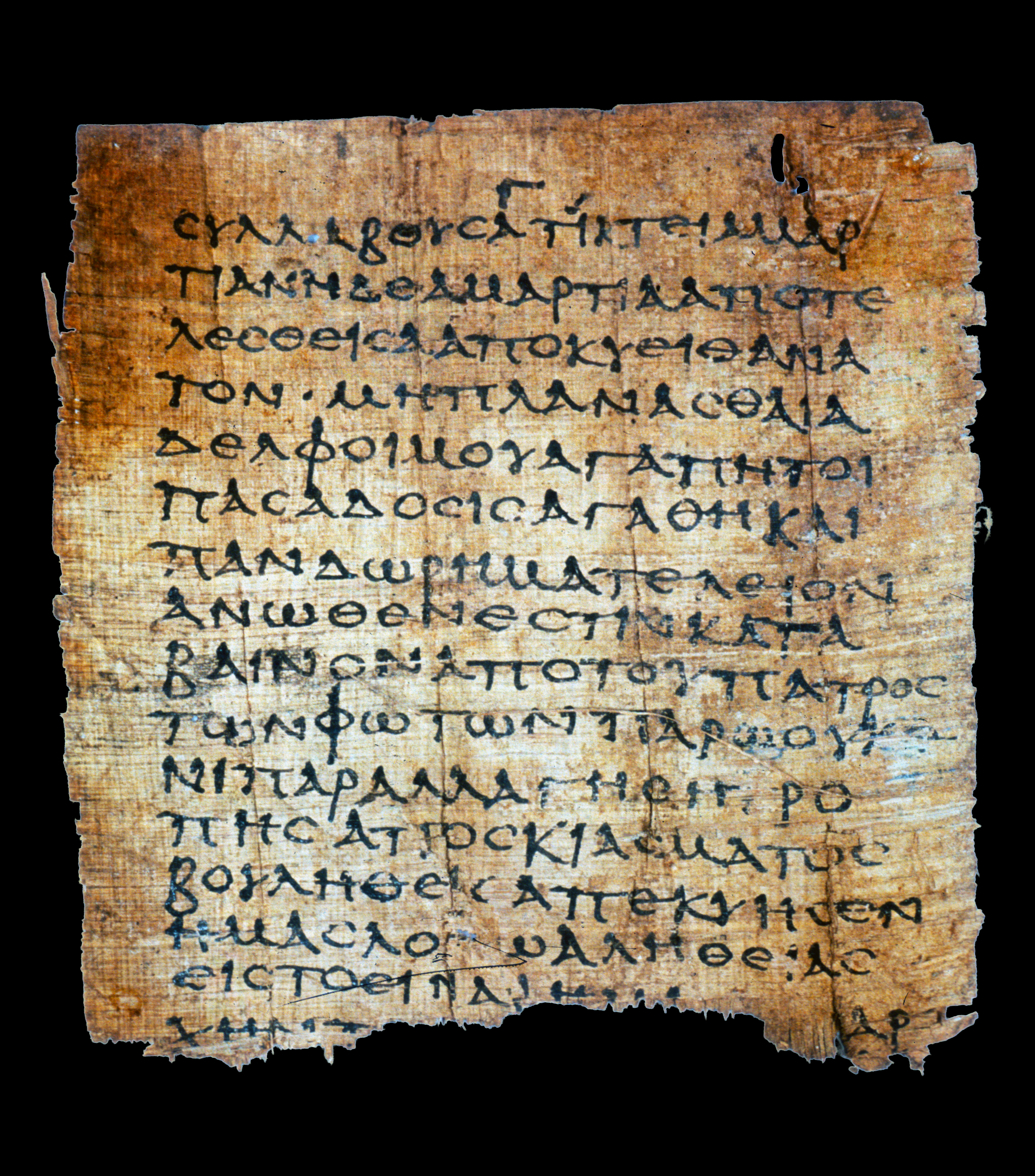
James 1:15–18 on Papyrus 23 (verso; c. AD 250)

The Epistle of James (Note: The book is sometimes called the Letter of James, book of James, or simply James (which is also its most common form of abbreviation; Ancient Greek: Ἰάκωβος, romanized: Iakōbos).) is a general epistle and one of the 21 epistles (didactic letters) in the New Testament. It was written originally in Koine Greek. The epistle aims to reach a wide Jewish audience. It survives in manuscripts from the 3rd century onward and is dated between the mid-1st and mid-2nd century AD.

The letter's opening words identify its author as "James, a servant of God and of the Lord Jesus Christ", who is writing to "the twelve tribes scattered abroad". Traditionally, the epistle is attributed to James the brother of Jesus (James the Just). This has been widely debated, with some early church figures affirming the connection and modern scholars often viewing the letter as pseudepigraphic due to its sophisticated Greek, possible dependence on later texts, and the lack of evidence for James' Greek education. During the last decades, the epistle of James has attracted increasing scholarly interest due to a surge in the quest for the historical James, his role in early Christianity, his beliefs, and his relationships and views. This James revival is also associated with an increasing level of awareness of the Jewish grounding of both the epistle and early Christianity.

The Epistle of James is a public letter modeled on Jewish diaspora epistles and wisdom literature, blending moral exhortation with possible influences from Jesus’ sayings and Greco-Roman philosophical and rhetorical traditions. The historical context of the Epistle of James is debated, with some viewing it as a response to Pauline theology while others see it as rooted in a Jewish-Christian milieu marked by tensions between rich and poor, emerging divisions between Jews and Christians, and ethical concerns for marginalized groups. The epistle emphasizes perseverance in the face of trials and encourages readers to live in accordance with the teachings they have received. The letter addresses a range of moral and ethical concerns, including pride, hypocrisy, favoritism, and slander. It advocates for humility, the pursuit of wisdom aligned with spiritual values rather than worldly ones, and the practice of prayer in all circumstances.

The Epistle of James was disputed and sparsely cited in early Christianity, gained wider recognition only by the late 4th century, and was criticized by Martin Luther during the Reformation for its teachings on faith and works, though it remained part of the New Testament canon. It emphasizes that true faith must be demonstrated through works, teaching that faith without works is dead, and highlighting care for the poor, ethical living, and communal practices like anointing the sick.

== Authorship ==
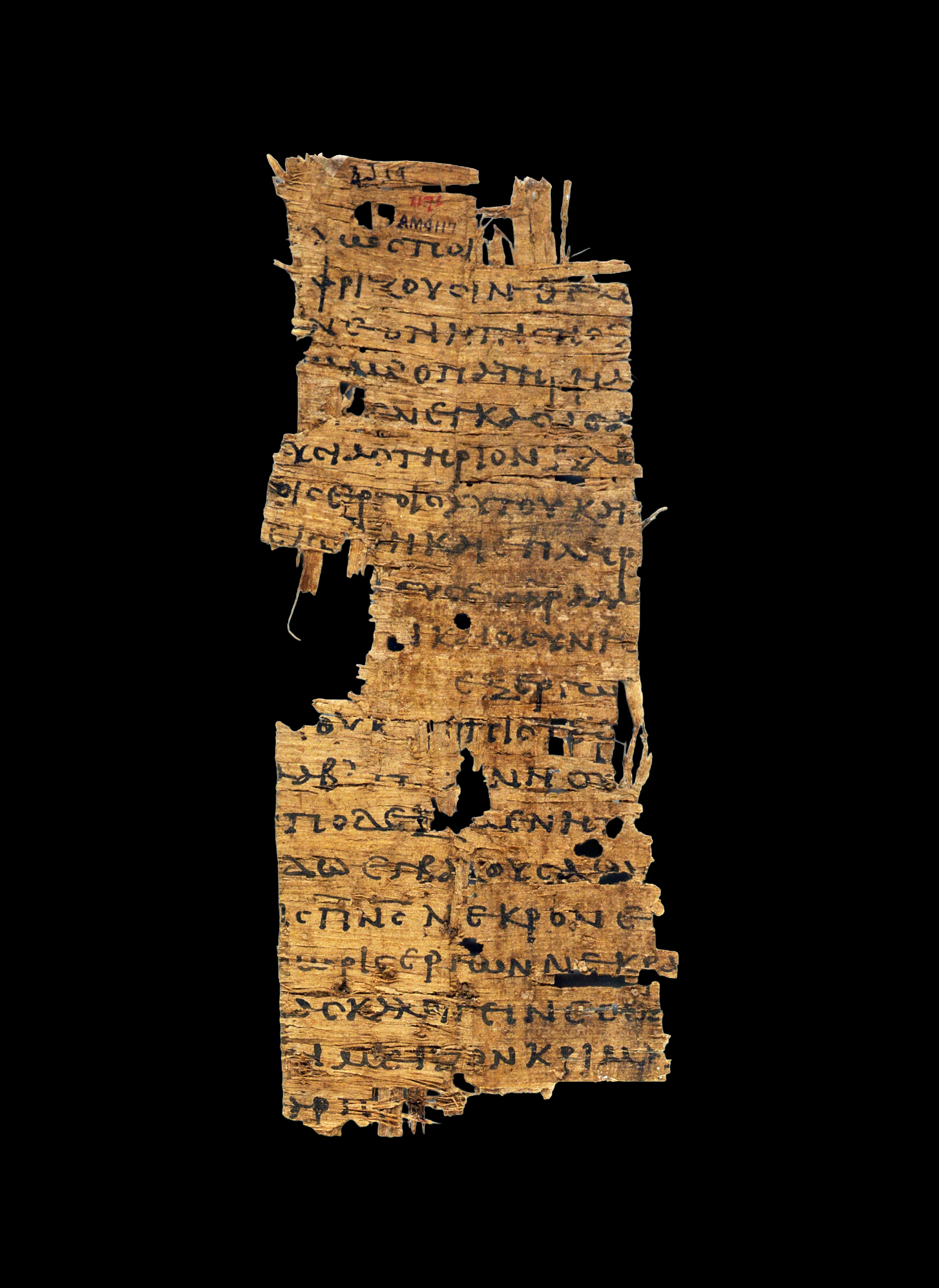
James 2:19–3:2 on Papyrus 20 (recto; c. AD 250)

The author is identified as "James, a servant of God and of the Lord Jesus Christ" (James 1:1). James (Jacob, Hebrew: יַעֲקֹב, romanized: Ya'aqov, Ancient Greek: Ιάκωβος, romanized: Iakobos) was an extremely common name in antiquity, and a number of early Christian figures are named James, including: James the son of Zebedee, James the Less, James the son of Alphaeus, and James the brother of Jesus (reported to also be the son of Alphaeus). Of these, James the brother of Jesus has the most prominent role in the early church, and is often understood as either the author of the epistle, or the implied author.

The earliest recorded references to the Epistle of James highlight the contentious nature of the epistle's authorship. Origen may be the first person to link the epistle to "James the brother of Lord", though this is only preserved in Rufinus's Latin translation of Origen. Eusebius writes that "James, who is said to be the author of the first of the so-called catholic epistles. But it is to be observed that it is disputed". Jerome reported that the Epistle of James "is claimed by some to have been published by some one else under his name, and gradually, as time went on, to have gained authority".

=== Traditional authorship ===
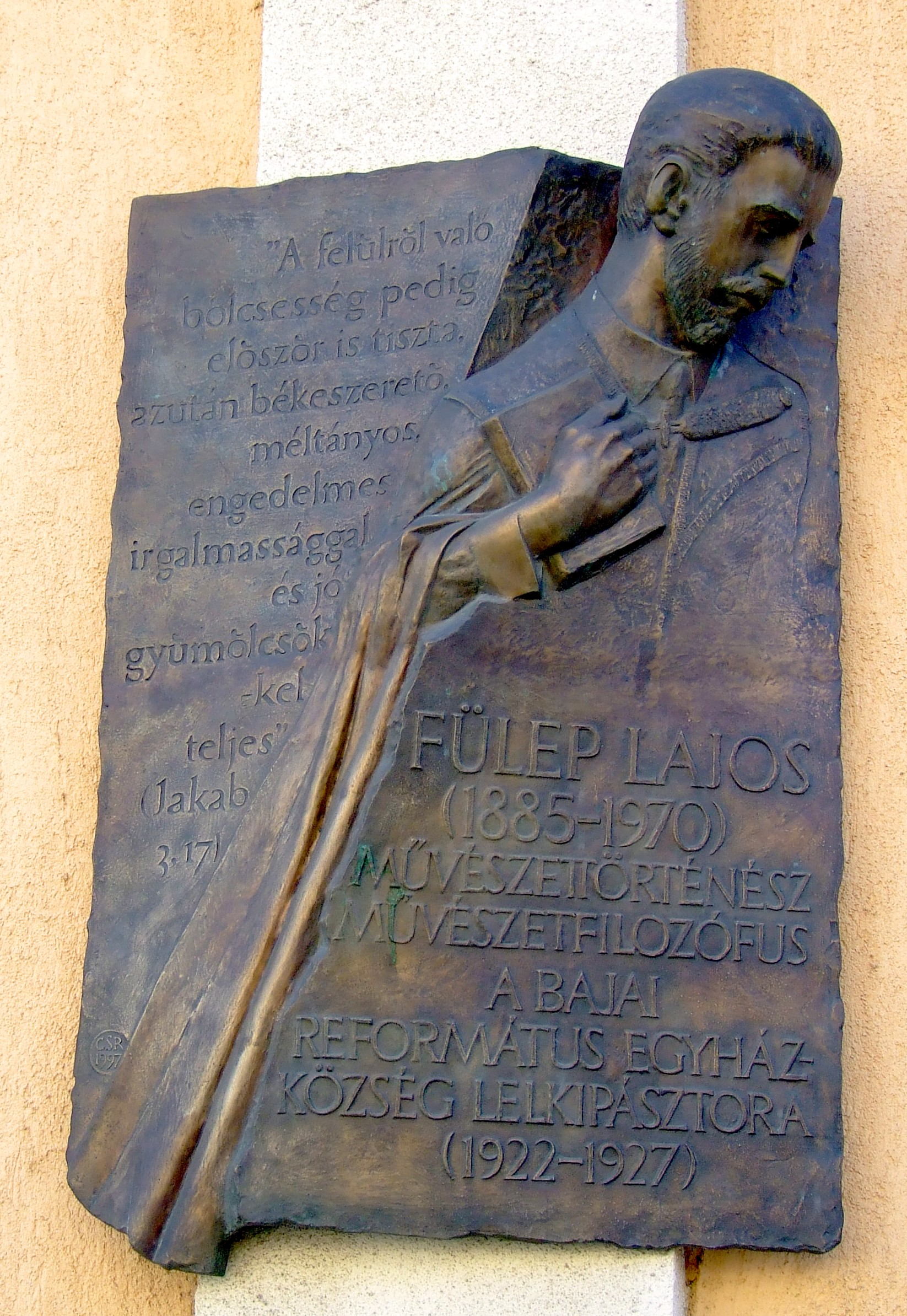
Memorial to Lajos Fülep, quoting James 3:17, "But the wisdom that comes from heaven is first of all pure; then peace-loving, considerate, submissive, full of mercy and good fruit, impartial and sincere."

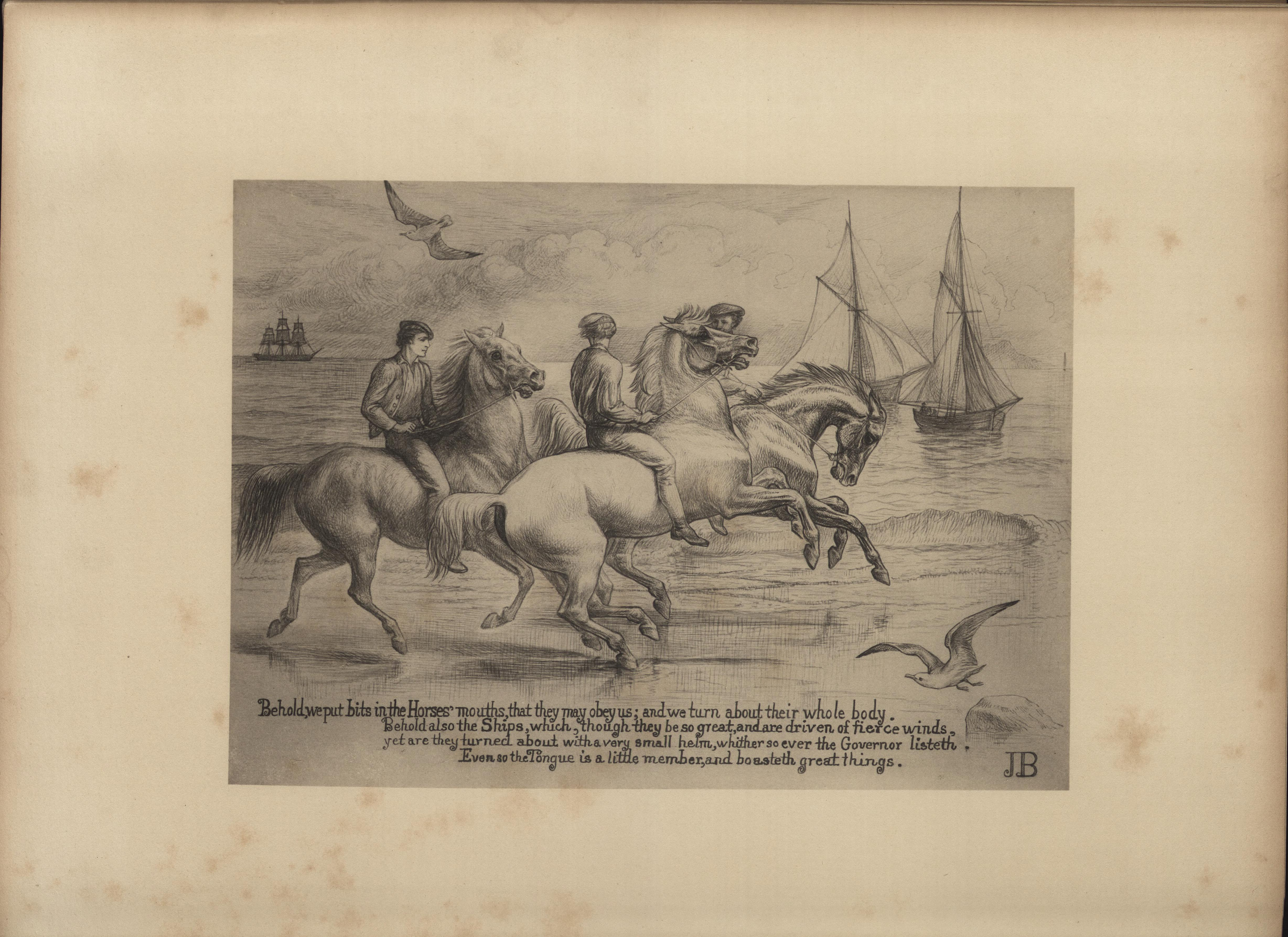
1886 drawing by Jemima Blackburn, quoting James 3:3–6

The link between James the brother of Jesus and the epistle continued to strengthen, and is now considered the traditional view on the authorship of the work. The traditional view can be divided into at least three further positions that relate also to the date of the epistle:

1. The historical James wrote the letter prior to the Galatians controversy (Galatians 2:11–14), and prior to the Jerusalem council (Acts 15);
2. The historical James wrote the letter in response to Paulinism of some sort;
3. The historical James wrote his letter after the events recorded in Galatians and Acts, but is not in dialogue with Paul or Paulinism.

Many who affirm traditional authorship think James had a sufficient proficiency in Greek education to write the letter himself. Some argue that James the brother of Jesus made use of an amanuensis, which explains the quality of Greek in the letter. Dan McCartney notes this position has garnered little support. Others have advocated for a two-stage composition theory, in which many sayings in the epistle originate with James the brother of Jesus. They were collected by James' disciples and redacted into the current form of the letter.

John Calvin and others suggested that the author was the James, son of Alphaeus, who is referred to as James the Less (often identified as James the "brother" of Jesus). Martin Luther denied it was the work of an apostle and derided it as an "epistle of straw". (Note: German: eyn rechte stroem Epistel, lit. 'a right strawy epistle', which George (1986) explains as meaning that its substance was entirely worthless.)

The Holy Tradition of the Eastern Orthodox Church teaches that the Book of James was "written not by either of the apostles, but by the 'brother of the Lord' who was the first bishop of the Church in Jerusalem."

=== Pseudonymous authorship ===
A prevalent view within scholarship considers the Epistle of James to be pseudonymous. The real author chose to write under the name James, intending that the audience perceive James the brother of Jesus as the author. Scholars who maintain pseudonymous authorship differ on whether this was a deceitful or pious practice.

The following arguments are often cited in support of pseudepigraphy:

1. The Greek in the Epistle of James is rather accomplished, leading many scholars to believe that it could not have been written by Jesus' brother. While it has been noted that James's homeland in Galilee was sufficiently Hellenised by the first century CE to produce figures such as the rhetorician Theodorus and the poet Meleager, there is no evidence (outside the Epistle of James) to suggest that James attained a Greek education.
2. The Epistle of James appears to borrow from 1 Peter, and if this is the case, James must be dated after 1 Peter (often dated between 70 and 100 CE).
3. If the letter envisages a conflict with later Paulinism, this would likewise presuppose a time after the death of James.

== Dating and surviving manuscripts ==
The original manuscript of the Epistle of James is lost. The earliest extant manuscripts of James date to the mid-to-late 3rd century.

According to Josephus, James the brother of Jesus was killed in 62 CE, during the high priesthood of Ananus, although Clement of Alexandria and Hegesippus provide a different account of James' death, c. 69 CE.

Those who maintain that the epistle is pseudonymous generally date the epistle later, from the late first to mid-second century. This is based on a number of considerations, including the epistle's potential dependence on 1 Peter, potential response to Paul's writings or Paul's later followers, late attestation in the historical record, and the 3rd and 4th century disputes concerning the epistle's authorship.

The historiographic debate currently seems to be leaning to the side of those in favor of early dating, although not through irrefutable evidence but through indications and probabilities.

Some of the oldest surviving manuscripts that contain some or all of this letter include:

- Papyrus 20 (early 3rd century)
- Papyrus 23 (c. 250 CE)
- Papyrus 100 (late 3rd century)
- Codex Vaticanus (325–350)
- Codex Sinaiticus (330–360)
- Codex Alexandrinus (400–440)
- Codex Ephraemi Rescriptus (c. 450)
- Papyrus 54 (5th century)
- Papyrus 74 (7th century).

An ancient manuscript containing this chapter in the Coptic language is Papyrus 6 (c. 350 CE). In Latin, the epistle is preserved in the León palimpsest (7th century).

== Genre ==
The Epistle of James is a public letter (epistle), and includes an epistolary prescript that identifies the sender ("James") and the recipients ("to the twelve tribes in the diaspora") and provides a greeting (James 1:1). The epistle resembles the form of a Diaspora letter, written to encourage Jewish-Christian communities living outside of Israel amid the hardships of diaspora life. James stands in the tradition of the Jewish genre of "Letters to the Diaspora", including the letters of the members of the family of Gamaliel, the one preserved in 2 Maccabees 1:1–9, or some copied by Josephus, all of which are characterised by a double opening and an abrupt ending.

Many consider James to have affinities to Jewish wisdom literature: "like Proverbs and Sirach, it consists largely of moral exhortations and precepts of a traditional and eclectic nature". The epistle also has affinities with many of the sayings of Jesus which are found in Luke and Matthew. Hartin and Kloppenborg argue that the author of James uses Q through the Hellenistic practice of aemulatio, while Christopher Tuckett finds knowledge of the Gospel of Luke by the author of James a possibility.

Other scholars have noted the epistle's affinities with Greco-Roman philosophical literature. Other studies have analysed sections of James in light of Greco-Roman rhetorical conventions.

== Structure ==
Some view the epistle as having no overarching outline: "James may have simply grouped together small 'thematic essays' without having more linear, Greco-Roman structures in mind." That view is generally supported by those who believe that the epistle may not be a true piece of correspondence between specific parties but an example of wisdom literature, formulated as a letter for circulation. The Catholic Encyclopedia says, "the subjects treated of in the Epistle are many and various; moreover, St. James not infrequently, whilst elucidating a certain point, passes abruptly to another, and presently resumes once more his former argument."

Others view the letter as having only broad topical or thematic structure. They generally organize James under three (in the views of Ralph Martin) to seven (in the views of Luke Johnson) general key themes or segments.

A third group believes that James was more purposeful in structuring his letter, linking each paragraph theologically and thematically:

James, like the gospel writers, can be seen as a purposeful theologian, carefully weaving his smaller units together into larger fabrics of thought and using his overall structure to prioritize his key themes.

— Blomberg and Kamell

The third view of the structuring of James is a historical approach that is supported by scholars who are not content with leaving the book as "New Testament wisdom literature, like a small book of proverbs" or "like a loose collection of random pearls dropped in no particular order onto a piece of string."

A fourth group uses modern discourse analysis or Greco-Roman rhetorical structures to describe the structure of James.

The United Bible Societies' Greek New Testament divides the letter into the following sections:

- Salutation (1:1)
- Faith and Wisdom (1:2–8)
- Poverty and Riches (1:9-11)
- Trial and Temptation (1:12–18)
- Hearing and Doing the Word (1:19–27)
- Warning against Partiality (2:1–13)
- Faith and Works (2:14–26)
- The Tongue (3:1–12)
- The Wisdom from Above (3:13–18)
- Friendship with the World (4:1–10)
- Judging a Brother (4:11–12)
- Warning against Boasting (4:13–17)
- Warning to the Rich (5:1–6)
- Patience and Prayer (5:7–20)

== Historical context ==
The exact historical circumstances that occasioned the epistle are unknown. Those who understand James 2 as a polemic against Paul or Paul's followers suggest an occasion for the letter aimed at opposing Pauline justification. Others have argued that James' discussion on faith and works does not have Pauline categories in view.

Some scholars have suggested that the epistle was written to both Christian and non-Christian Jews, who continued to worship together before the parting of the ways between Christianity and Judaism. The warning against cursing people (James 3:9–10) has been read in light of this historical reconstruction, and Dale Allison has argued that "James reflects an environment in which some Jews, unhappy with Jewish Christians, were beginning to use the Birkat ha-minim or something very much like it" to curse Christians.

Poverty and wealth are key concerns throughout the epistle, and these issues are likely to reflect the epistle's historical context. The author shows concern for vulnerable and marginalised groups, such as "orphans and widows" (James 1:27), believers who are "poorly clothed and lacking in daily food" (James 2:15), and the oppressed waged-worker (James 5:4). He writes strongly against the rich (James 1:10; 5:1–6) and those who show partiality towards them (James 2:1–7).

== Doctrine ==
=== Justification ===
The epistle contains the following famous passage concerning salvation and justification:

What good is it, my brothers, if someone says he has faith but does not have works? Can that faith save him? If a brother or sister is poorly clothed and lacking in daily food, and one of you says to them, "Go in peace, be warmed and filled," without giving them the things needed for the body, what good is that? So also faith by itself, if it does not have works, is dead. But someone will say, "You have faith and I have works." Show me your faith apart from your works, and I will show you my faith by my works. You believe that God is one; you do well. Even the demons believe—and shudder!

Do you want to be shown, you foolish person, that faith apart from works is useless? Was not Abraham our father justified by works when he offered up his son Isaac on the altar? You see that faith was active along with his works, and faith was completed by his works; and the Scripture was fulfilled that says, "Abraham believed God, and it was counted to him as righteousness"—and he was called a friend of God. You see that a person is justified by works and not by faith alone.

And in the same way was not also Rahab the prostitute justified by works when she received the messengers and sent them out by another way? For as the body apart from the spirit is dead, so also faith apart from works is dead.

— Epistle of James 2:14-26

This passage has been contrasted with the teachings of Paul the Apostle on justification. Some scholars even believe that the passage is a response to Paul. One issue in the debate is the meaning of the Greek word δικαιόω (dikaiόō), 'render righteous or such as he ought to be'), with some among the participants taking the view that James is responding to a misunderstanding of Paul.

Roman Catholicism and Eastern Orthodoxy have historically argued that the passage disproves simplistic versions of the doctrine of justification by faith alone (sola fide).

The early Protestants resolved the apparent conflict between James and Paul regarding faith and works in alternate ways from the Catholics and Orthodox. One modern American Protestant explanation pre-supposes that James taught sola fide:

Paul was dealing with one kind of error while James was dealing with a different error. The errorists Paul was dealing with were people who said that works of the law were needed to be added to faith in order to help earn God's favor. Paul countered this error by pointing out that salvation was by faith alone apart from deeds of the law (Galatians 2:16; Romans 3:21–22). Paul also taught that saving faith is not dead but alive, showing thanks to God in deeds of love (Galatians 5:6 ['...since in Christ Jesus it is not being circumcised or being uncircumcised that can effect anything – only faith working through love.']). James was dealing with errorists who said that if they had faith they didn't need to show love by a life of faith (James 2:14–17). James countered this error by teaching that faith is alive, showing itself to be so by deeds of love (James 2:18,26). James and Paul both teach that salvation is by faith alone and also that faith is never alone but shows itself to be alive by deeds of love that express a believer's thanks to God for the free gift of salvation by faith in Jesus.

— Faith and Works, Wisconsin Evangelical Lutheran Synod

According to Ben Witherington III, differences exist between the Apostle Paul and James, but both used the law of Moses, the teachings of Jesus and other Jewish and non-Jewish sources, and "Paul was not anti-law any more than James was a legalist". A more recent article suggests that the current confusion regarding the Epistle of James about faith and works resulted from Augustine of Hippo's anti-Donatist polemic in the early fifth century. This approach reconciles the views of Paul and James on faith and works.

=== Anointing of the sick ===
The epistle is also the chief biblical text for the anointing of the sick. James wrote:

Is anyone among you sick? Let him call for the elders of the church, and let them pray over him, anointing him with oil in the name of the Lord. And the prayer of faith will save the one who is sick, and the Lord will raise him up. And if he has committed sins, he will be forgiven.

— Epistle of James 5:14,15

G. A. Wells suggested that the passage was evidence of late authorship of the epistle, on the grounds that the healing of the sick being done through an official body of presbyters (elders) indicated a considerable development of ecclesiastical organisation "whereas in Paul's day to heal and work miracles pertained to believers indiscriminately (I Corinthians, XII:9)."

=== Works, deeds and care for the poor ===
James and the M Source material in Matthew, alone within the New Testament canon, maintain a stand against the rejection of works and deeds. According to E. P. Sanders, traditional Christian theology wrongly divested the term "works" of its ethical grounding, part of the effort to characterize Judaism as legalistic. However, for James and for all Jews, faith is alive only through Torah observance. In other words, belief demonstrates itself through practice and manifestation. For James, claims about belief are empty, unless they are alive in action, works and deeds.

Do not merely listen to the word, and so deceive yourselves. Do what it says. Anyone who listens to the word but does not do what it says is like someone who looks at his face in a mirror and, after looking at himself, goes away and immediately forgets what he looks like. But whoever looks intently into the perfect law that gives freedom, and continues in it—not forgetting what they have heard, but doing it—they will be blessed in what they do.

— Epistle of James 1:22–25

Religion that God our Father accepts as pure and faultless is this: to look after orphans and widows in their distress and to keep oneself from being polluted by the world.

— Epistle of James 1:27

Speak and act as those who are going to be judged by the law that gives freedom, because judgment without mercy will be shown to anyone who has not been merciful. Mercy triumphs over judgment.

— Epistle of James 2:12–13

The epistle emphasizes the importance of acts of charity or works to go along with having the Christian faith by means the following three verses in chapter 2:

What shall it profit, my brethren, if a man say he hath faith, but hath not works? Shall faith be able to save him?

— James 2:14

But some man will say: Thou hast faith, and I have works. Shew me thy faith without works; and I will shew thee, by works, my faith.

— James 2:18

But wilt thou know, O vain man, that faith without works is dead?

— James 2:20

=== Torah observance ===
James is unique in the canon by its seemingly explicit support of Torah observance (the Law). According to Bibliowicz, not only is this text a unique view into the milieu of the Jewish founders – its inclusion in the canon signals that as canonization began (fourth century onward) Torah observance among believers in Jesus was still authoritative. According to modern scholarship James, Q, Matthew, the Didache, and the pseudo-Clementine literature reflect a similar ethos, ethical perspective, and stand on, or assume, Torah observance, according to the same source. James call to Torah observance (James 1:22-27) ensures salvation (James 2:12–13, 14–26). However, this is not generally the interpretation of this text, (neither the generally understood progression of thought,) and is doubtfully what James originally had in mind given, for example, the theology in the Epistle of Paul to the Romans and throughout the New Testament. Hartin is supportive of the focus on Torah observance and concludes that these texts support faith through action and sees them as reflecting the milieu of the Jewish followers of Jesus. Hub van de Sandt sees Matthew's and James' Torah observance reflected in a similar use of the Jewish Two Ways theme which is detectable in the Didache too (Didache 3:1–6). Scot McKnight thinks that Torah observance is at the heart of James's ethics. A strong message against those advocating the rejection of Torah observance characterizes, and emanates from, this tradition: "Some have attempted while I am still alive, to transform my words by certain various interpretations, in order to teach the dissolution of the law; as though I myself were of such a mind, but did not freely proclaim it, which God forbid! For such a thing were to act in opposition to the law of God which was spoken by Moses, and was borne witness to by our Lord in respect of its eternal continuance; for thus he spoke: 'The heavens and the earth shall pass away, but one jot or one tittle shall in no wise pass away from the law.'"

James seem to propose a more radical and demanding interpretation of the law than mainstream Judaism. According to John Painter, there is nothing in James to suggest any relaxation of the demands of the law. "No doubt James takes for granted his readers' observance of the whole law, while focusing his attention on its moral demands."

In this context, there is a broader discussion on both sides.

== Canonicity ==
The first explicit references to the Epistle of James are found in the writings of Origen of Alexandria (e.g. Commentary on John, 19.23) in the third century. Scholars have generally rejected the possible second-century allusions to James in the Apostolic Fathers and Irenaeus of Lyons' Against Heresies. Neither is James mentioned by Tertullian (c. 155–220 CE) or Cyprian (c. 210–258 CE), and its authenticity of the epistle doubted by Theodore of Mopsuestia (c. 350–428 CE). In Historia ecclesiae 2.23.25, Eusebius classes James among the Antilegomena or disputed works, stating, "it is to be observed that it is disputed; at least, not many of the ancients have mentioned it, as is the case likewise with the epistle that bears the name of Jude, which is also one of the seven so-called catholic epistles. Nevertheless we know that these also, with the rest, have been read publicly in very many churches."

Its late recognition in the Church, especially in the West, was a consequence primarily of its sparse attestation by earlier Christian authors and its disputed authorship. Jerome reported that the Epistle of James "is claimed by some to have been published by some one else under his name, and gradually, as time went on, to have gained authority" (De viris illustribus 2).

The Epistle of James is missing from the Muratorian fragment (poss. 2nd to 4th century), the Cheltenham list (c. 360 CE), but was listed with the twenty-seven New Testament books by Athanasius of Alexandria in his Thirty-Ninth Festal Epistle (367 CE), and subsequently affirmed by the Councils of Laodicea (c. 363 CE), of Rome (382 CE) and of Carthage (397 and 419).

During the Reformation era, Martin Luther took issue with the epistle on theological grounds, finding James' description of faith and works incompatible with his understanding of justification. Reportedly, he once went as far as to assert "I almost feel like throwing Jimmy into the stove like the priest from Kalenberg", (Note: In the original German: Ich wil schier den Jeckel in den offen werffen wie der pfaff vom Kalenberg. Luther uses "Jimmy", which is short for James, as a metonymy to refer to the epistle.) a metaphor for his being tempted to remove the Epistle of James from the Bible. Luther nonetheless chose to include James in his German translation, though he moved it (along with Hebrews, Jude, and Revelation) to the end of the Bible.

== Significance ==
=== Latter Day Saint history ===
James 1:5 has particular importance in the Latter Day Saint tradition.

If any of you lack wisdom, let him ask of God, that giveth to all men liberally, and upbraideth not; and it shall be given him.

— James 1:5: King James Version

Joseph Smith claims that the reading and contemplation of this verse inspired him to ask God for wisdom, leading to his First Vision, and thus to what his followers consider to be the Restoration, i.e. the creation of the Church of Jesus Christ of Latter-day Saints.

=== Option for the poor ===
In Pope Leo XIV's first apostolic exhortation, Dilexi te, he refers to James 2:2–4 in exhorting the church to become "a place where the poor have a privileged place".

== See also ==
- Abrogation of Old Covenant laws
- Gospel of James
- Jacob (name)
- Pauline Christianity
- Textual variants in the Epistle of James

== Notes ==
Epistle of James General Epistle
| Preceded by Hebrews | New Testament Books of the Bible | Succeeded by First Peter |
