= Papyrus 100 =

- New Testament manuscript
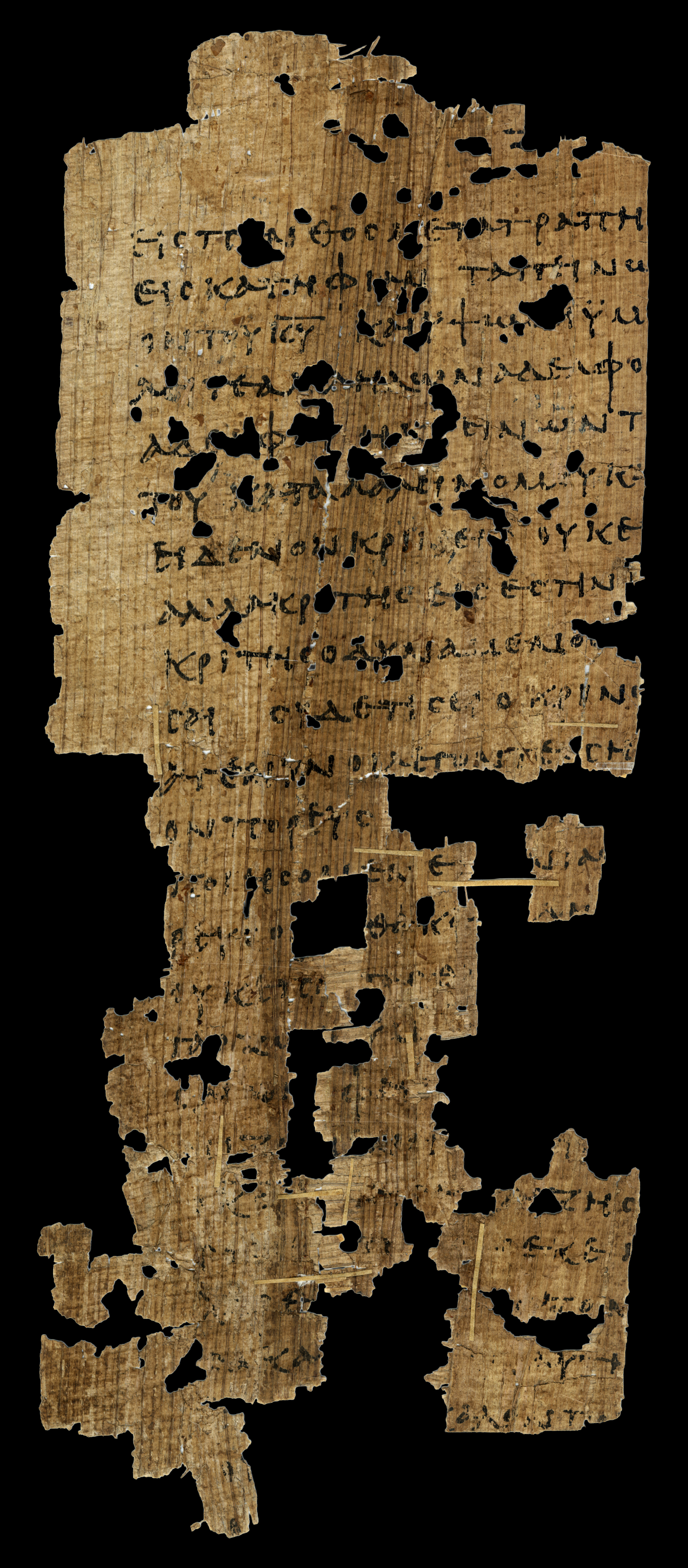
- Recto, James 3:13-4:4
- Name: P. Oxy. LXV 4449
- Sign: 𝔓^{100}
- Text: Epistle of James 3:13-4:4; 4:9-5:1
- Date: 3rd / 4th century
- Script: Greek
- Found: Oxyrhynchus, Egypt
- Now at: Ashmolean Museum
- Cite: R. Hubner, OP LXV (London: 1998), pp. 24-29
- Size: 19 x 7.5 cm
- Type: Alexandrian text-type
- Category: none
- Note: concurs with 𝔓^{74}

Papyrus 100 is an early copy of the New Testament in Greek. It is a papyrus manuscript of the Epistle of James in a fragmentary edition. It is designated by the siglum 𝔓^{100} in the Gregory-Aland numbering of New Testament manuscripts. The surviving texts of James are verses 3:13-4:4; 4:9-5:1. Using the study of comparative writing styles (palaeography), it has been assigned to the late 3rd or early 4th century CE.

== Text ==
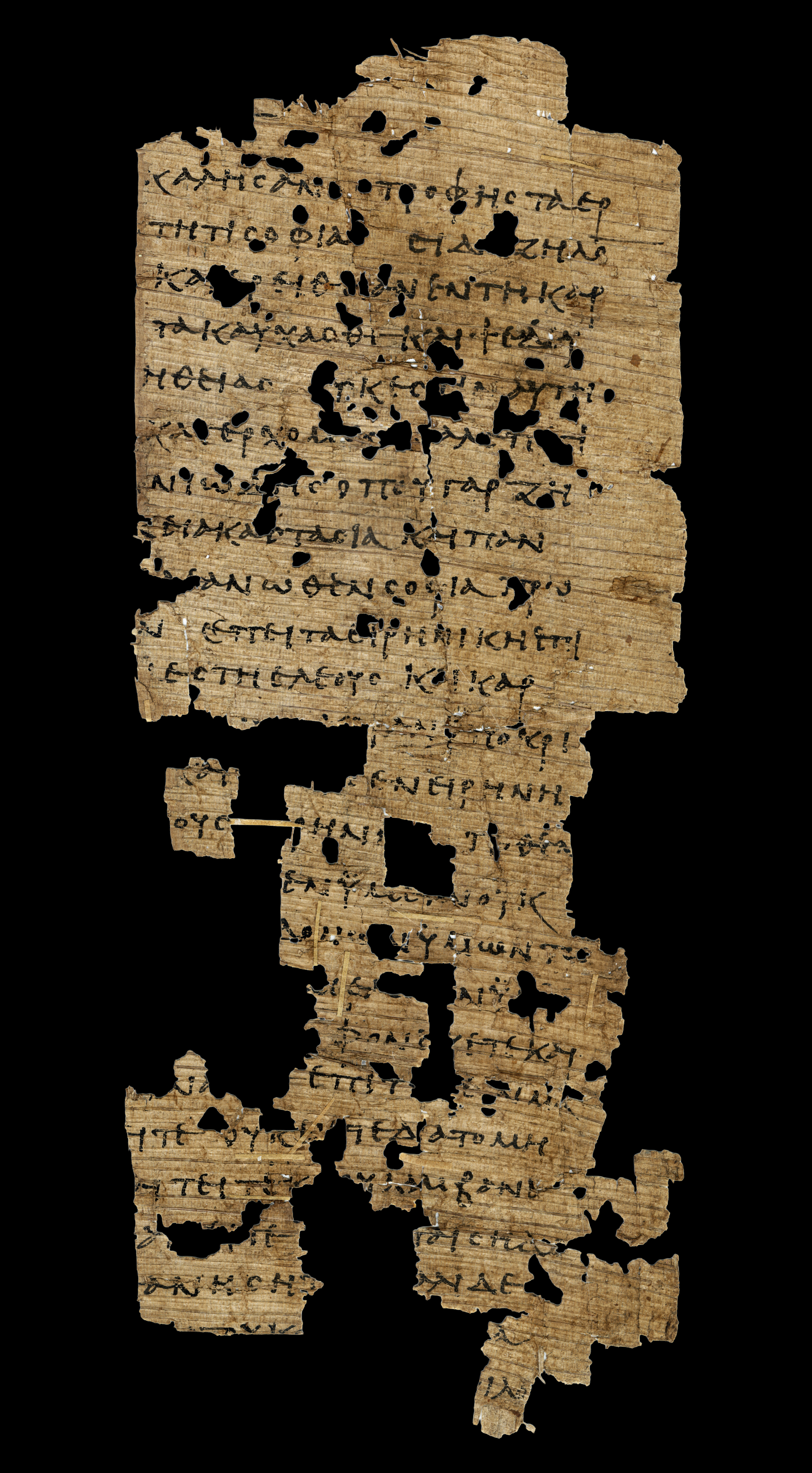
Verso, James 4:9-5:1

The Greek text of the codex is considered a representative of the Alexandrian text-type. According to textual scholar Philip Comfort, 𝔓^{100<} "generally concurs" with the Alexandrian witnesses, 𝔓^{74} א A and B. As of January 2011, it has not yet been placed in any of Biblical scholar Kurt Aland's categories of New Testament manuscripts.

Transcription of Verses
James 3:13-18
13 – [δειξατω εκ της] καλης αν[ασ]τροφης τα ερ[γα αυτου εν πραυ]τητι σοφια[ς] 14 ει δ[ε] ζηλον [πικρον εχετε] και̣ ε̣ρειθε̣ι̣αν εν τη καρ[δια υμων μη κα]τακαυχασθε και ψεδε̣υ[σθε κατα της αλ]ηθειας 15 [ο]υκ εστ̣ι̣ν αυτη [η σοφια ανωθεν] κατ̣ερχομε̣ν̣[η] α̣λ̣λ ε̣πι̣γ̣ι[ος ψυχικη δαιμ]ο̣νιωδης 16 οπου γαρ ζη[λος και εριθεια ε]κ̣ει ακαστασια και παν [φαυλον πραγμα] 17 η̣ δ̣ε̣ ανωθεν σοφια πρω[τον μεν αγνη εστι]ν επειτα ειρηνικη επι[εικης ευπειθης] μ̣εστη ελεους κα̣ι καρ[πων αγαθων αδιακρ]ι̣τ̣[ος] κ̣α̣ι α̣νυ̣ποκρι[τος] 18 [καρπος δε δι]κ̣αι[οσυνη]ς̣ εν ειρηνη [σπειρεται τοις ποι]ουσ[ιν ει]ρ̣ηνη̣[ν]

James 4:1-14
1 πο̣θεν̣ [πολεμοι και ποθεν μαχαι] εν υμε̣ι̣ν ουκ [εντευθεν εκ των η]δονω̣ν υμων των̣ [στρατευομενων εν τοις] μ̣ελ̣ε̣[σι]ν υμ̣[ω]ν̣2 [επιθυμειτε και ουκ εχετε] φονε̣υ̣ετε και [ζηλουτε και ου δ]υ̣να[σθ]ε̣ επιτυ̣[χ]ε̣[ι]ν μα[χεσθε και πολεμ]ε̣ιτε ουκ ε̣χ̣ε̣τ̣ε δι̣α το μη [αιτεισθαι υμας] 3 α̣ιτειτε κ[αι] ο̣υ λαμβανε̣[τε διοτι κακως] αι̣[τ]ε̣ι̣τε [ινα] [εν] ταις ηδο̣[ναις υμων] [δα]π̣ανησητ̣[ε] 4 [μοιχ]α̣λιδε[ς ουκ οιδατε οτι η φιλι]α̣ τ̣ο̣υ κ̣ο̣[σμου εχθρ]α [του θυ̅ εστιν ος εαν ουν βουληθη] φ̣ιλο[ς]

9 εις π[ε]νθος μ̣ετατραπη[τω και η χαρα] εις κατηφιαν 10 ταπεινω[θητε ενωπι]ο̣ν του κυ̅ και υψωσ̣[ε]ι υμ[ας] 11 [μη καταλα]λε̣ι̣τε αλληλων αδελφο[ι ο καταλαλων] αδελ̣φο̣υ̣ η κ[ρ]εινων τ[ον αδελφον αυ]του καταλαλει ν̣ομου κα̣[ι κρινει νομον] ει δε νον κρινεις̣ ουκ ε[ι ποιητης νομου] αλλα κρ[ι]της 12 εις εστιν ν̣[ομοθετης και] κριτης ο δυναμενος̣ [σωσαι και απολε]σαι συ δε τις ει ο κρινω̣[ν τον πλησιον] 13 αγε νυν οι λεγοντες̣ ση[μερον η αυρι]ον πορευσ[ομεθα εις τηνδε την πολιν και] π̣οιησομ̣εν εκ̣[ει ε]νιαυ̣[τον και εμπο]ρευσο[με]θα κα̣[ι] [κερ]δη[σομεν] 14 [οιτινες] ουκ ε̣πι[σ]τ̣α̣σθε̣ [το της αυριον ποια] γαρ̣ ζω̣η̣ υ̣μ[ων ατμις γαρ εστε η προς] ο̣λιγ̣ον̣ φαιν̣[ομενη επειτα και αφα]ν̣ιζο̣μ̣ε̣ν̣η̣
James 4:15-17
15 [αντι] τ̣ο̣[υ λεγειν υμας εαν] ο̣ κς̣̅ [θε]λ̣η̣σ̣η̣ κ̣αι̣ ζησ[ομεν και ποιη]σομ̣ε̣[ν] τ̣ο̣[υτ]ο̣ η̣ εκε[ι]ν̣[ο] 16 [νυν δε καυ]χα̣σ̣θ[ε εν ταις] α̣[λ]α̣ζον[ειαις υμων πα]σα κα[υχησις] τ̣ο̣ι̣αυτ̣η̣ [πονηρα εστιν] 17 ε̣ι̣[δοτι ουν] κ̣αλον πο̣ι̣[ειν και μη ποι]ο̣υ̣[ντι αμαρτια αυτω εστιν]

James 5:1
1 [αγε νυν] ο̣[ι πλουσιοι κλαυσατε ολολυζοντες] –

== Location ==
The manuscript is currently housed at the Ashmolean Museum (P. Oxy. LXV 4449) at Oxford.

== See also ==
- List of New Testament papyri
- Oxyrhynchus Papyri
