= Nomina sacra =

Christian scribal practice

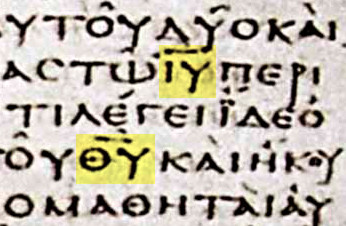
Two nomina sacra are highlighted, Ι̅Υ̅ and Θ̅Υ̅, representing of/from Jesus and of/from God (in genitive) respectively, in this passage from John 1 in Codex Vaticanus (B), 4th century.

In Christian scribal practice, nomina sacra (singular: nomen sacrum, Latin for 'sacred name') is the abbreviation of several frequently occurring divine names or titles, especially in Greek manuscripts of the Bible. A nomen sacrum consists of two or more letters from the original word spanned by an overline.

Biblical scholar and textual critic Bruce M. Metzger lists 15 such words treated as nomina sacra from Greek papyri: the Greek counterparts of God, Lord, Jesus, Christ, Son, Spirit, David, Cross, Mother, Father, Israel, Savior, Man, Jerusalem, and Heaven. These nomina sacra are all found in Greek manuscripts of the 3rd century and earlier, except Mother, which appears in the 4th. All 15 occur in Greek manuscripts later than the 4th century.

Nomina sacra also occur in some form in Latin, Coptic, Armenian (indicated by the pativ), Gothic, Old Nubian, Old Irish and Old Church Slavonic (indicated by the titlo).

== Origin and development ==
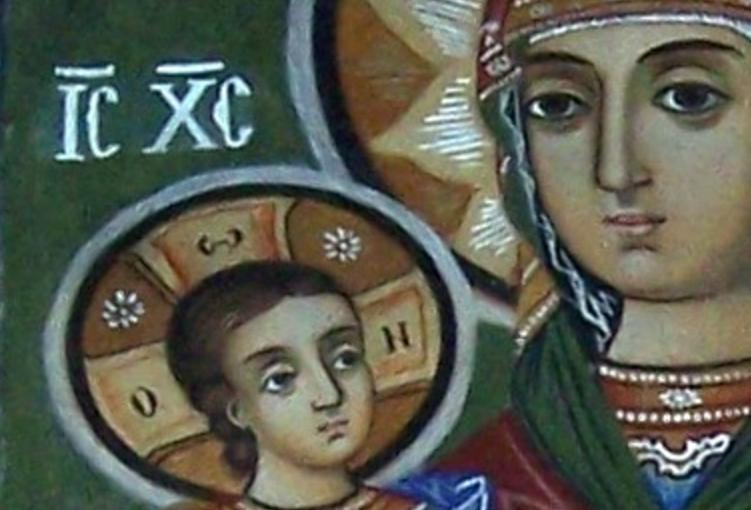
Nomina sacra ΙϹ ΧϹ, from the Greek ΙΗΣΟΥΣ ΧΡΙΣΤΟΣ (Jesus Christ — the letter Ϲ on the icon being the lunate (moon shaped) form of the Greek letter sigma Σ). Detail from an icon at the Troyan Monastery in Bulgaria. See complete icon

Nomina sacra are consistently observed in even the earliest extant Christian writings, along with the codex form rather than the roll, implying that when these were written, in approximately the second century, the practice had already been established for some time. However, it is not known precisely when and how the nomina sacra first arose.

The initial system of nomina sacra apparently consisted of just four or five words, called nomina divina: the Greek words for Jesus, Christ, Lord, God, and possibly Spirit. The practice quickly expanded to a number of other words regarded as sacred.

In the system of nomina sacra that came to prevail, abbreviation is by contraction, meaning that the first and last letter (at least) of each word are used. In a few early cases, an alternate practice is seen of abbreviation by suspension, meaning that the initial two letters (at least) of the word are used; e.g., the opening verses of Revelation in 𝔓^{18} write Ἰησοῦς Χριστός (Jesus Christ) as Ι̅Η̅ Χ̅Ρ̅. Contraction, however, offered the practical advantage of indicating the case of the abbreviated noun.

It is evident that the use of nomina sacra was an act of reverence rather than a purely practical space-saving device, as they were employed even where well-established abbreviations of far more frequent words such as and were avoided, and the nomen sacrum itself was written with generous spacing. Furthermore, early scribes often distinguished between mundane and sacred occurrences of the same word, e.g. a spirit vs. the Spirit, and applied nomina sacra only to the latter (at times necessarily revealing an exegetical choice), although later scribes would mechanically abbreviate all occurrences.

Scholars have advanced a number of theories on the origin of the nomina sacra. Biblical scholar Larry Hurtado has suggested Greek numerals as the origin of the overline spanning the nomen sacrum, with Ι̅Η̅, the ordinary way of writing "18", being taken as reminiscent of a suspended form of ΙΗΣΟΥΣ (Jesus). In some Greek Scripture manuscripts the Hebrew tetragrammaton (transliterated as YHWH) is found unabbreviated in the Greek text. The Septuagint manuscript Papyrus Oxyrhynchus 1007 even uses an abbreviated form of the tetragrammaton: two Greek zetas with a horizontal line through the middle, imitating two Paleo-Hebrew yodhs (𐤉𐤉).

Greek culture also employed a number of ways of abbreviating even proper names, though none in quite the same form as the nomina sacra. Inspiration for the contracted forms (using the first and last letter) has also been seen in Revelation, where Jesus speaks of himself as "the beginning and the end" and "the first and the last" as well "the Alpha and the Omega".

Linguist George Howard argues that κ̅ς̅ (κύριος) and θ̅ς̅ (θεός) were the initial nomina sacra, created by non-Jewish Christian scribes who "found no traditional reasons to preserve the tetragrammaton" in copies of the Septuagint. Hurtado, following Colin Roberts, rejects that claim in favour of the theory that the first was ι̅η̅ (Ἰησοῦς), as suggested in the Epistle of Barnabas, followed by the analogous χ̅ρ̅ (Χριστός), and later by κ̅ς̅ and θ̅ς̅, at about the time when the contracted forms ι̅ς̅ and χ̅ς̅ were adopted for the first two.

Cilliers Breytenbach and Christiane Zimmermann report that by the end of the 2nd century nomina sacra occur even in Christian tomb inscriptions in Greek in Lycaonia (modern central Turkey).

== List of Greek nomina sacra ==
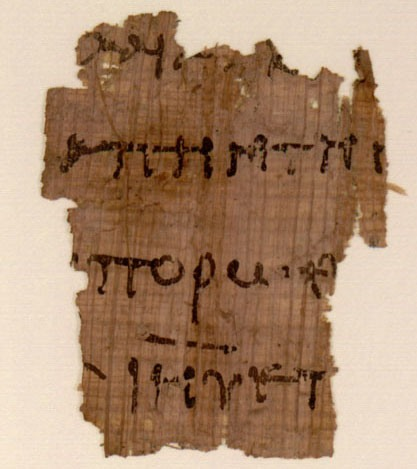
Papyrus 111 (3rd century AD), with the nomen sacrum Ι̅Η̅Υ̅ (indicating genitive 'of Jesus', Ἰησοῦ) visible at bottom

| English meaning | Greek word | Nominative (Subject) | Genitive (Possessive) |
|---|---|---|---|
| God | Θεός, Theos | Θ̅Σ̅ | Θ̅Υ̅ |
| Lord | Κύριος, Kyrios | Κ̅Σ̅, Κ̅Σ̅ | Κ̅Υ̅, Κ̅Υ̅ |
| Jesus | Ἰησοῦς, Iēsous | Ι̅Σ̅, Ι̅Η̅Σ̅ | Ι̅Υ̅, Ι̅Η̅Υ̅ |
| Christ/Messiah | Χριστός, Christos | Χ̅Σ̅, Χ̅Ρ̅Σ̅ | Χ̅Υ̅, Χ̅Ρ̅Υ̅ |
| Son | Υἱός, Huios | Υ̅Σ̅ | Υ̅Υ̅ |
| Spirit | Πνεῦμα, Pneuma | Π̅Ν̅Α̅ | Π̅Σ̅, Π̅Ν̅Σ̅, Π̅Ν̅Ο̅Σ̅ |
| David | Δαυίδ, Dauid | Δ̅Α̅Δ̅ |
| Cross | Σταυρός, Stauros | Σ̅Τ̅Σ̅ | Σ̅Τ̅Υ̅ |
| Mother | Μήτηρ, Mētēr | Μ̅Η̅Ρ̅, Μ̅Ρ̅ | Μ̅Ρ̅Σ̅ |
| Father | Πατήρ, Patēr | Π̅Η̅Ρ̅, Π̅Ρ̅ | Π̅Ρ̅Σ̅ |
| Israel | Ἰσραήλ, Israēl | Ι̅Η̅Λ̅ |
| Savior | Σωτήρ, Sōtēr | Σ̅Η̅Ρ̅ | Σ̅Ρ̅Σ̅ |
| Human | Ἄνθρωπος, Anthrōpos | Α̅Ν̅Ο̅Σ̅ | Α̅Ν̅Ο̅Υ̅ |
| Jerusalem | Ἱερουσαλήμ, Ierousalēm | Ι̅Λ̅Η̅Μ̅ |
| Heaven/Heavens | Οὐρανός, Ouranos | Ο̅Υ̅Ν̅Ο̅Σ̅ | Ο̅Υ̅Ν̅Ο̅Υ̅ |

== New Testament Greek manuscripts containing nomina sacra (before 300 CE) ==
Greek manuscript identification has the main Gregory-Aland siglum first, with the shelf number at the respective papyri locations in brackets.

| Greek manuscript | Manuscript date | Nomina sacra used |
|---|---|---|
| 𝔓^{1} (P. Oxy. 2) | ~250 | Ι̅Υ̅ Ι̅Σ̅ Χ̅Υ̅ Υ̅Υ̅ Κ̅Υ̅ Π̅Ν̅Σ̅ |
| 𝔓^{4} (Suppl. Gr. 1120) | 150–225 | Θ̅Σ̅ Θ̅Υ̅ Κ̅Υ̅ Κ̅Σ̅ Π̅Ν̅Ι̅ Π̅Ν̅Ο̅Σ̅ Π̅Ν̅Α̅ Χ̅Σ̅ Ι̅Υ̅ Ι̅Σ̅ |
| 𝔓^{5} (P. Oxy. 208 + 1781) | ~250 | Ι̅Η̅Ν̅ Ι̅Η̅Σ̅ Π̅Ρ̅ Π̅Ρ̅Α̅ Π̅Ρ̅Σ̅ Θ̅Υ̅ |
| 𝔓^{9} (P. Oxy. 402) | ~250 | Θ̅Σ̅ Χ̅Ρ̅Σ̅ |
| 𝔓^{12} (P. Amherst. 3b) | ~285 | Θ̅Σ̅ |
| 𝔓^{13} (P. Oxy. 657 + PSI 1292) | 225–250 | Θ̅Σ̅ Θ̅Ν̅ Θ̅Υ̅ Θ̅Ω̅ Ι̅Σ̅ Ι̅Ν̅ Ι̅Υ̅ Κ̅Σ̅ Κ̅Υ̅ |
| 𝔓^{15} (P. Oxy. 1008) | 200–300 | Κ̅Ω̅ Κ̅Υ̅ Χ̅Υ̅ Α̅Ν̅Ω̅Ν̅ Α̅Ν̅Ω̅ Π̅Ν̅Α̅ Θ̅Ν̅ Κ̅Μ̅Ο̅Υ̅ |
| 𝔓^{16} (P. Oxy. 1009) | 250–300 | Θ̅Υ̅ Ι̅Υ̅ Χ̅Ω̅ |
| 𝔓^{17} (P. Oxy. 1078) | ~300 | Θ̅Ω̅ Π̅Ν̅Σ̅ |
| 𝔓^{18} (P. Oxy. 1079) | 250–300 | Ι̅Η̅ Χ̅Ρ̅ Θ̅Ω̅ |
| 𝔓^{20} (P. Oxy. 1171) | 200–250 | Π̅Ν̅Σ̅ Κ̅Ν̅ Θ̅Υ̅ |
| 𝔓^{22} (P. Oxy. 1228) | 200–250 | Π̅Σ̅ Π̅Ν̅Α̅ Π̅Ρ̅Σ̅ Π̅Ρ̅Α̅ Ι̅Η̅Σ̅ Α̅Ν̅Ο̅Σ̅ |
| 𝔓^{24} (P. Oxy. 1230) | ~300 | Π̅Ν̅Α̅ Θ̅Υ̅ |
| 𝔓^{27} (P. Oxy. 1395) | 200–250 | Θ̅Υ̅ Κ̅Ω̅ |
| 𝔓^{28} (P. Oxy. 1596) | 255–300 | Ι̅Σ̅ Ι̅Ν̅ |
| 𝔓^{29} (P. Oxy. 1597) | 200–250 | Θ̅Σ̅ Θ̅Ν̅ |
| 𝔓^{30} (P. Oxy. 1598) | 200–250 | Κ̅Υ̅ Κ̅Ν̅ Θ̅Ω̅ Ι̅Η̅Υ̅ |
| 𝔓^{32} (P. Rylands 5) | 150–200 | Θ̅Υ̅ |
| 𝔓^{35} (PSI 1) | ~300 | Κ̅Σ̅ Κ̅Υ̅ |
| 𝔓^{37} (P. Mich. Inv. 1570) | ~260 | Κ̅Ε̅ Ι̅Η̅Σ̅ Π̅Ν̅Α̅ Ι̅Η̅Σ̅Υ̅ |
| 𝔓^{38} (P. Mich. Inv. 1571) | ~225 | Χ̅Ρ̅Ν̅ Π̅Ν̅Α̅ Κ̅Υ̅ Ι̅Η̅Ν̅ Ι̅Η̅Υ̅ Π̅Ν̅Τ̅Α̅ |
| 𝔓^{39} (P. Oxy. 1780) | 200–300 | Π̅Η̅Ρ̅ Π̅Ρ̅Α̅ Ι̅Η̅Σ̅ |
| 𝔓^{40} (P. Heidelberg G. 645) | 200–300 | Θ̅Σ̅ Θ̅Υ̅ Θ̅Ν̅ Ι̅Υ̅ Χ̅Ω̅ Χ̅Υ̅ |
| 𝔓^{45} (P. Chester Beatty I) | ~250 | Κ̅Ε̅ Κ̅Σ̅ Κ̅Ν̅ Κ̅Υ̅ Ι̅Η̅ Ι̅Υ̅ Ι̅Η̅Σ̅ Π̅Ρ̅ Π̅Ρ̅Σ̅ Π̅Ρ̅Α̅ Π̅Ρ̅Ι̅ Θ̅Υ̅ Θ̅Ν̅ Θ̅Ω̅ Θ̅Σ̅; Π̅Ν̅Ι̅ Π̅Ν̅Σ̅ Π̅Ν̅Α̅ Υ̅Ν̅ Υ̅Ε̅ Υ̅Σ̅ Υ̅Ω̅ Σ̅⳨Ν̅ Σ̅⳨Ν̅Α̅Ι̅ Χ̅Υ̅ |
| 𝔓^{46} (P. Chester Beatty II + P. Mich. Inv. 6238) | 175–225 | Κ̅Ε̅ Κ̅Ν̅ Κ̅Υ̅ Κ̅Ω̅ Κ̅Σ̅ Χ̅Ρ̅Ω̅ Χ̅Ρ̅Υ̅ Χ̅Ρ̅Ν̅ Χ̅Ν̅ Χ̅Σ̅ Χ̅Ω̅ Χ̅Υ̅ Χ̅Ρ̅Σ̅ Ι̅Η̅Υ̅ Ι̅Η̅Ν̅ Ι̅Η̅Σ̅ Θ̅Ω̅ Θ̅Υ̅ Θ̅Ν̅ Θ̅Σ̅ Π̅Ν̅Α̅ Π̅Ν̅Ι̅ Π̅Ν̅Σ̅ Υ̅Ι̅Υ̅ Υ̅Ι̅Ν̅ Υ̅Ι̅Σ̅ Υ̅Ν̅ Σ̅Τ̅Ρ̅Ε̅Σ̅ Σ̅Τ̅Ρ̅Ν̅ Σ̅Τ̅Ρ̅Ω̅ Σ̅Τ̅Ρ̅Ο̅Σ̅ Σ̅Τ̅Ρ̅Ο̅Υ̅ Ε̅Σ̅Τ̅Ρ̅Ο̅Ν̅ Ε̅Σ̅Τ̅Ρ̅Α̅Ι̅ Ε̅Σ̅Τ̅Α̅Ν̅ Σ̅Τ̅Ο̅Υ̅ Α̅Ι̅Μ̅Α̅ Α̅Ν̅Ο̅Υ̅ Α̅Ν̅Ο̅Ν̅ Α̅Ν̅Ο̅Σ̅ Α̅Ν̅Ω̅Ν̅ Α̅Ν̅Ο̅Ι̅Σ̅ Π̅Ρ̅Ι̅ Π̅Η̅Ρ̅ Π̅Ρ̅Α̅ Π̅Ρ̅Σ̅ Ι̅Υ̅ |
| 𝔓^{47} (P. Chester Beatty III) | 200–300 | Θ̅Υ̅ Θ̅Σ̅ Θ̅Ν̅ Θ̅Ω̅ Α̅Θ̅Ν̅ Κ̅Σ̅ Κ̅Ε̅ Κ̅Υ̅ Ε̅Σ̅Τ̅Ρ̅Ω̅ Π̅Ν̅Α̅ Χ̅Υ̅ Π̅Ρ̅Σ̅ |
| 𝔓^{48} (PSI 1165) | 200–300 | Υ̅Σ̅ |
| 𝔓^{49} (P. Yale 415 + 531) | 200–300 | Κ̅Ω̅ Θ̅Υ̅ Θ̅Σ̅ Ι̅Υ̅ Π̅Ν̅ Χ̅Σ̅ Χ̅Υ̅ Χ̅Ω̅ |
| 𝔓^{50} (P. Yal 1543) | ~300 | Ι̅Λ̅Η̅Μ̅ Π̅Ν̅Α̅ Α̅Ν̅Ο̅Σ̅ Θ̅Σ̅ Θ̅Υ̅ |
| 𝔓^{53} (P. Mich. inv. 6652) | ~250 | Π̅Ρ̅Σ̅ Ι̅Η̅Σ̅ Π̅Ε̅Ρ̅ Κ̅Ν̅ |
| 𝔓^{64} (Gr. 17) | ~150 | Ι̅Σ̅ Κ̅Ε̅ |
| 𝔓^{65} (PSI XIV 1373) | ~250 | Χ̅Υ̅ Θ̅Σ̅ |
| 𝔓^{66} (P. Bodmer II + Inv. Nr. 4274/4298) | 150–200 | Κ̅Σ̅ Κ̅Υ̅ Κ̅Ε̅ Θ̅Σ̅ Θ̅Ν̅ Θ̅Υ̅ Θ̅Ω̅ Ι̅Σ̅ Ι̅Ν̅ Ι̅Υ̅ Χ̅Σ̅ Χ̅Ν̅ Χ̅Υ̅ Υ̅Σ̅ Υ̅Ν̅ Υ̅Ω̅ Π̅Ν̅Α̅ Π̅Ν̅Ι̅ Π̅Ν̅Σ̅ Π̅Η̅Ρ̅ Π̅Ρ̅Α̅ Π̅Ρ̅Σ̅ Π̅Ρ̅Ι̅ Π̅Ε̅Ρ̅ Π̅Ρ̅Ε̅Σ̅ Α̅Ν̅Ο̅Σ̅ Α̅Ν̅Ο̅Ν̅ Α̅Ν̅Ο̅Υ̅ Α̅Ν̅Ω̅Ν̅ Α̅Ν̅Ω̅ Α̅Ν̅Ο̅Ι̅Σ̅ Α̅Ν̅Ο̅Υ̅Σ̅ Σ̅⳨Ω̅ Σ̅⳨Ο̅Ν̅ Σ̅⳨Ο̅Υ̅ Σ̅⳨Θ̅Η̅ Σ̅⳨Α̅Τ̅Ε̅ Σ̅⳨Ω̅Σ̅Ω̅ Ε̅Σ̅⳨Α̅Ν̅ Ε̅Σ̅⳨Θ̅Η̅ |
| 𝔓^{69} (P. Oxy. 2383) | ~200 | Ι̅Η̅Ν̅ |
| 𝔓^{70} (P. Oxy. 2384 + PSI Inv. CNR 419, 420) | 250–300 | Υ̅Ν̅ Ι̅Σ̅ Π̅Η̅Ρ̅ |
| 𝔓^{72} (P. Bodmer VII and VIII) | 200–300 | Ι̅Υ̅ Ι̅Η̅Υ̅ Ι̅Η̅Ν̅ Χ̅Ρ̅Υ̅ Χ̅Ρ̅Ν̅ Χ̅Ρ̅Σ̅ Χ̅Ρ̅Ω̅ Θ̅Υ̅ Θ̅Σ̅ Θ̅Ν̅ Θ̅Ω̅ Π̅Ρ̅Σ̅ Π̅Α̅Ρ̅ Π̅Τ̅Ρ̅Α̅ Π̅Ρ̅Ι̅ Π̅Ν̅Σ̅ Π̅Ν̅Α̅ Π̅Ν̅Α̅Ι̅ Π̅Ν̅Ι̅ Π̅Ν̅Τ̅Ι̅ Κ̅Υ̅ Κ̅Σ̅ Κ̅Ν̅ Κ̅Ω̅ Α̅Ν̅Ο̅Ι̅ |
| 𝔓^{75} (P. Bodmer XIV and XV) | 175–225 | Ι̅Σ̅ Ι̅Η̅Σ̅ Ι̅Υ̅ Ι̅Η̅Υ̅ Ι̅Ν̅ Ι̅Η̅Ν̅ Θ̅Σ̅ Θ̅Ν̅ Θ̅Υ̅ Θ̅Ω̅ Κ̅Σ̅ Κ̅Ν̅ Κ̅Υ̅ Κ̅Ω̅ Κ̅Ε̅ Χ̅Σ̅ Χ̅Ν̅ Χ̅Υ̅ Π̅Ν̅Α̅ Π̅Ν̅Σ̅ Π̅Ν̅Ι̅ Π̅Ν̅Ο̅Σ̅ Π̅Ν̅Τ̅Α̅ Π̅Ν̅Α̅Σ̅Ι̅ Π̅Ν̅Α̅Τ̅Ω̅Ν̅ Π̅Ρ̅Σ̅ Π̅Η̅Ρ̅ Π̅Ρ̅Α̅ Π̅Ρ̅Ι̅ Π̅Ρ̅Ο̅Σ̅ Π̅Ρ̅ Υ̅Σ̅ Υ̅Ν̅ Υ̅Υ̅ Ι̅Η̅Λ̅ Ι̅Λ̅Η̅Μ̅ Σ̅⳨Ο̅Ν̅ Σ̅Τ̅⳨Ο̅Ν̅ Σ̅⳨Ω̅Θ̅Η̅Ν̅Α̅Ι̅ Α̅Ν̅Ο̅Σ̅ Α̅Ν̅Ο̅Ν̅ Α̅Ν̅Ο̅Υ̅ Α̅Ν̅Ο̅Ι̅ Α̅Ν̅Ω̅Ν̅ Α̅Ν̅Ω̅ Α̅Ν̅Ο̅Υ̅Σ̅ Α̅Ν̅Ο̅Ι̅Σ̅ Α̅Ν̅Ε̅ |
| 𝔓^{78} (P. Oxy 2684) | 250–300 | Κ̅Ν̅ Ι̅Η̅Ν̅ Ι̅Η̅Ν̅ Χ̅Ρ̅Ν̅ |
| 𝔓^{90} (P. Oxy 3523) | 150–200 | Ι̅Η̅Σ̅ |
| 𝔓^{91} (P. Mil. Vogl. Inv. 1224 + P. Macquarie Inv. 360) | ~250 | Θ̅Υ̅ Θ̅Σ̅ Π̅Ρ̅Σ̅ Χ̅Ρ̅Ν̅ Ι̅Η̅Ν̅ |
| 𝔓^{92} (P. Narmuthis 69.39a + 69.229a) | ~300 | Χ̅Ρ̅Ω̅ Κ̅Υ̅ Θ̅Υ̅ |
| 𝔓^{100} (P. Oxy 4449) | ~300 | Κ̅Υ̅ Κ̅Σ̅ |
| 𝔓^{101} (P. Oxy 4401) | 200–300 | Υ̅Σ̅ Π̅Ν̅Α̅ Π̅Ν̅Ι̅ |
| 𝔓^{106} (P. Oxy 4445) | 200–250 | Π̅Ν̅Α̅ Π̅Ν̅Ι̅ Χ̅Ρ̅Σ̅ Ι̅Η̅Ν̅ Ι̅Η̅Σ̅ |
| 𝔓^{108} (P. Oxy 4447) | 175–225 | Ι̅Η̅Σ̅ Ι̅Η̅Ν̅ |
| 𝔓^{110} (P. Oxy. 4494) | ~300 | Κ̅Σ̅ |
| 𝔓^{111} (P. Oxy 4495) | 200–250 | Ι̅Η̅Υ̅ |
| 𝔓^{113} (P. Oxy. 4497) | 200–250 | Π̅Ν̅Ι̅ |
| 𝔓^{114} (P. Oxy. 4498) | 200–250 | Θ̅Σ̅ |
| 𝔓^{115} (P. Oxy. 4499) | 225–275 | Ι̅Η̅Λ̅ Α̅Υ̅Τ̅Ο̅Υ̅ Π̅Ρ̅Σ̅ Θ̅Ω̅ Θ̅Υ̅ Α̅Ν̅Ω̅Ν̅ Π̅Ν̅Α̅ Ο̅Υ̅Ν̅Ο̅Υ̅ Ο̅Υ̅Ν̅Ο̅Ν̅ Κ̅Υ̅ Θ̅Ν̅ Α̅Ν̅Ο̅Υ̅ Ο̅Υ̅Ν̅Ω̅ |
| 𝔓^{121} (P. Oxy. 4805) | ~250 | Ι̅Σ̅ Μ̅Η̅Ι̅ |
| 𝔓^{137} (P. Oxy. 5345) | 100-200 | Π̅Ν̅Ι̅ |
| 0162 (P. Oxy 847) | ~300 | Ι̅Η̅Σ̅ Ι̅Σ̅ Π̅Ρ̅Σ̅ |
| 0171 (PSI 2.124) | ~300 | Κ̅Σ̅ Ι̅Η̅Σ̅ |
| 0189 (P. Berlin 11765) | ~200 | Α̅Ν̅Ο̅Σ̅ Π̅Ν̅Α̅ Κ̅Υ̅ Κ̅Ω̅ Ι̅Λ̅Η̅Μ̅ Θ̅Ω̅ Ι̅Σ̅Η̅Λ̅ |
| 0220 (MS 113) | ~300 | Κ̅Ν̅ Ι̅Υ̅ Ι̅Ν̅ Χ̅Υ̅ Θ̅Υ̅ |

== See also ==
- Christogram
- Staurogram
