= Susanna and the Elders (painting) =

Susanna and the Elders is the title of several works of art depicting the eponymous biblical account. These include:

- Susanna and the Elders (Altdorfer), 1526
- Susanna and the Elders (Chassériau), 1856
- Susanna and the Elders (Artemisia Gentileschi), several paintings
- Susannah and the Elders (Guercino), 1650
- Susanna and the Elders (Lotto), 1517
- Susanna and the Elders (Rubens), 1507
- Susanna and the Elders (Rembrandt), 1547
- Susanna and the Elders (Tintoretto), 1555–56
- Susanna and the Elders (van Dyck), 1621–22
- Susannah and the Elders (Veronese), 1580

== See also ==
- Susanna at her Bath by Francesco Hayez
- Susanna and the Elders in art
