= Susanna and the Elders (Artemisia Gentileschi) =

Susanna and the Elders (Italian: Susanna e i vecchioni) is the title of several works of art by Italian painter Artemisia Gentileschi depicting the eponymous biblical account. These include:

- Susanna and the Elders (Artemisia Gentileschi, Pommersfelden), 1610
- Susanna and the Elders (Artemisia Gentileschi, Burghley), 1622
- Susanna and the Elders (Artemisia Gentileschi, private collection), 1630s
- Susanna and the Elders (Artemisia Gentileschi, Edinburgh), 1639
- Susanna and the Elders (Artemisia Gentileschi, Brno), 1649
- Susanna and the Elders (Artemisia Gentileschi, Bologna), 1652
