= Codex Chisianus 45 =

10th-century biblical manuscript

Codex Chisianus 45 (also Codex Chigianus 45; Vatican Library, Chigi R. VII 45; numbered 88 in Rahlfs Septuagint manuscripts, 87 in Field's Hexapla ) is a biblical manuscript variably dated to the 10th century or the early 14th century or early 14th-century. It was first edited in 1772.

== Description ==
Codex Chisianus 45 is a significant manuscript for the study of the Septuagint, particularly for its preservation of the Old Greek (OG) text of the Book of Daniel. The OG text of Daniel largely disappeared from Greek tradition by the end of the 4th century, having been superseded by Theodotion's revision, which was endorsed by prominent figures such as Jerome. The OG version survived primarily in Codex Chisianus 45, which was the sole known Greek manuscript of this version until the 1931 discovery of Papyrus 967 (Chester Beatty IX/X).

The text of Codex Chisianus 45 is known for its substantial deviations from the Masoretic Text (MT) of Daniel. These deviations include transpositions, expansions, abridgements, and modifications that occasionally alter the prophetic messages. Irish scholar John Gwynn, writing in 1911, offered a critical assessment of the translation of Daniel found in Codex Chisianus, remarking:

Indeed, the greater part of this Chisian Daniel cannot be said to deserve the name of a translation at all. It deviates from the original in every possible way; transposes, expands, abridges, adds or omits, at pleasure. The latter chapters it so entirely rewrites that the predictions are perverted, sometimes even reversed, in scope.

The authenticity of the Greek text in Codex Chisianus has been corroborated by the Syro-Hexaplar Codex (dated 616/7), which contains a Syriac translation of Origen's recension. Originally housed in the Chigi Library in Rome, Codex Chisianus 45 was transferred to the Vatican Library in 1922, where it remains today.

The manuscript's dating has been subject to scholarly debate, with some sources placing it in the 10th century and others, including the Göttingen Septuaginta project, dating it to the early 14th century.

== See also ==
- Susanna (Book of Daniel)
