= Alfred Chester Beatty =

American copper mining magnate (1875–1968)

Sir Alfred Chester Beatty
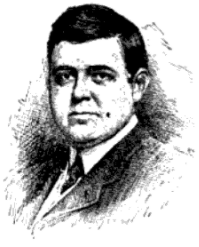
- Portrait of Beatty, 1910
- Born: Alfred Chester Beatty; 7 February 1875; New York City, U.S.
- Died: 19 January 1968 (aged 92); Monte Carlo, Monaco
- Burial place: Glasnevin Cemetery
- Other names: A. Chester Beatty, Chester, Chet, the "King of Copper"
- Citizenship: United States; United Kingdom; Ireland
- Education: Columbia School of Mines (E.M., D.Sc.)
- Occupation: Businessman
- Years active: 1898–1960
- Known for: Chester Beatty Library; Chester Beatty Papyri; Chester Beatty Medical Papyri
- Notable work: Papyrus 45; Papyrus 46; Papyrus 967; Papyrus Chester Beatty V; Papyrus Chester Beatty VI; The Contendings of Horus and Seth
- Spouses: Grace 'Ninette' Rickard (m. 1900; died 1911) Edith Dunn (m. 1913; died 1952)
- Children: 2
- Relatives: Guy Greville, 9th Earl of Warwick (great-grandson)
- Website: Chester Beatty Library

Sir Alfred Chester Beatty (7 February 1875 – 19 January 1968) was an American mining magnate and philanthropist. A successful businessman, he was given the epithet the "King of Copper", in reference to his fortune. He became a naturalised British subject in 1933, was knighted in 1954, and was made an honorary citizen of Ireland in 1957.

Beatty collected African, Asian, European and Middle Eastern manuscripts, rare printed books, prints as objets d'art. After moving to Dublin in 1950, he established the Chester Beatty Library on Shrewsbury Road to house his collection; it opened to the public in 1954. The collections were bequeathed to the Irish people and entrusted to the care of the state in his Irish will. He donated several papyrus documents to the British Museum, his second wife's collection of Marie Antoinette's personal furniture to the Louvre and a number of his personal paintings that once hung in the picture gallery of his London home to the National Gallery of Ireland. He also made possible the expansion and relocation of the Cancer Hospital Research Institute, which was renamed the Chester Beatty Institute, and later renamed the Institute of Cancer Research, in 1939.

== Early life ==
Alfred Chester Beatty was born into a middle-class family on the site of what is now the Rockefeller Center in Manhattan, New York City, on 7 February 1875, as the youngest child to John Cuming Beatty, a banker and stockbroker, and his wife, Hetty (née Bull). He had two brothers, William Gedney Beatty and Robert Chetwood Beatty. He was known to family and friends as A. Chester Beatty, Chester or "Chet".

Beatty graduated from Columbia School of Mines in 1898 with his Master of Engineering degree and his Doctor of Science degree. After graduating, he bought a one-way ticket to Denver, Colorado. His first job in the mines earned him $2 per day as a "mucker", clearing away rocks and soil from mine tunnels. He was quickly promoted to supervisor of the Kektonga Silver Mines.

== Career ==
Beatty joined John Hays Hammond on the management team of the Guggenheim Exploration Company in 1903. His first mentor was T. A. Rickard, a mining engineer. This position soon made him wealthy, and in 1908, when he left the Guggenheims, he was regarded as one of the country's leading mining engineers. He then set up an office on Broadway, Manhattan as an independent mining consultant.

Beatty founded the London-based mining company, Selection Trust, in 1914. World War I delayed the company's expansion, but during the 1920s the business expanded to acquire interest in countries included the USSR, the Gold Coast (present-day Ghana) and the Colony and Protectorate of Sierra Leone. He made a fortune in Northern Rhodesia (present-day Zambia) and the Belgian Congo (present-day Democratic Republic of the Congo), where he exploited the Copperbelt. He became known as the "King of Copper".

== Collector ==
An early family anecdote recalls that, as a young boy, Beatty caught the collection bug, bidding at auctions for mining samples. He recalled attending an auction with his father at the age of ten, and bidding ten cents on a piece of pink calcite. During his time in Denver, he began collecting stamps, which grew into an award-winning collection. Before his move to London, he had already started collecting Chinese snuff bottles and Japanese netsuke, inro and tsuba.

Due to a condition of the lungs called silicosis, which Beatty had acquired through his years working in American mines, he and his family wintered in the Kingdom of Egypt, until the outbreak of World War II, and after the war, in the South of France. During his first trip to Cairo in the winter of 1913/14, he became interested in papyrus and Islamic manuscripts.

In 1931, an announcement in The Times daily newspaper cast Beatty as a great collector. He had acquired an important collection of Biblical manuscripts, now known as the Chester Beatty Papyri. The discovery changed the existing understanding of pre-Constantinian textural history. With the New Testament books—Gospels and Acts (BP I), Pauline Epistles (BP II) and Revelation (BP III)—all dated to the third century, these documents were not only surprising for having survived the Diocletian persecutions at the beginning of the next century, moved the understanding of when Christians accepted the four gospels as canonical to earlier than had previously been presumed.

During a family voyage to Japan and China in 1917, Beatty acquired painted albums and scrolls, and he continued to purchase Chinese, Japanese and south-east Asian manuscripts, textiles and artefacts, which he kept for the rest of his life.

Beatty's reputation as a collector grew, and so did his network of advisers and agents. As in his business life, Beatty relied on the advice of experienced specialists but made the final decision on any purchase himself. By this time Edith was also establishing herself as a serious collector in her own right. While she was buying Impressionist and Post-Impressionist paintings and French furniture, Beatty was acquiring important Islamic material, including an exceptional collection of illuminated copies of the Quran, and Mughal, Turkish and Persian manuscripts. His Western holdings were enhanced by acquisitions of Coptic, Syriac, Armenian and Greek manuscripts. To his Asian holdings he added Tibetan, Thai, Burmese and Sumatran manuscripts. His eye was drawn to richly illustrated material, fine bindings and beautiful calligraphy, but he was also deeply committed to preserving texts for their historic value. He concerned himself only with works of the finest quality, and this became the hallmark of his collection.

Initially, Beatty was a competitive force in the burgeoning Orientalist art market of the early 20th century. The major library and museum institutions anticipated his presence when prospecting acquisitions. However, in 1925, he began what would later become a robust partnership with the British Museum. Though in later cases he would purchase an object and simply donate it, for the manuscript now known as the Minto Album, he amicably agreed to split the folios. The lot was sold to Sir Eric Maclagan, Director of the British Museum, as part of a joint-purchase agreement for $3,950. He had first picked the folios, the museum bought the remainder for $2000, and he charitably donated an addition folio. The Beattys were also patrons of the British Museum, donating nineteen ancient Egyptian papyri to the Museum.

Between 1939 and 1949, Beatty acquired over one hundred and forty 19th century paintings to display in the picture gallery of his London home. The gallery had been built as a result of the conversion of the stables to a library in 1934. The gallery linked the main house to the garden library. In 1940, he packed up the paintings and shipped them to New York City for safekeeping during World War II. In 1949, he decided to donate part of his collection of French 19th-century paintings to the Taoiseach of the day, John A. Costello, for his support in facilitating his move from London. These are now part of the collection of the National Gallery of Ireland. One of the paintings was an idealized version of peasant life called The Gleaners by Jules Breton.

== Move to Dublin ==
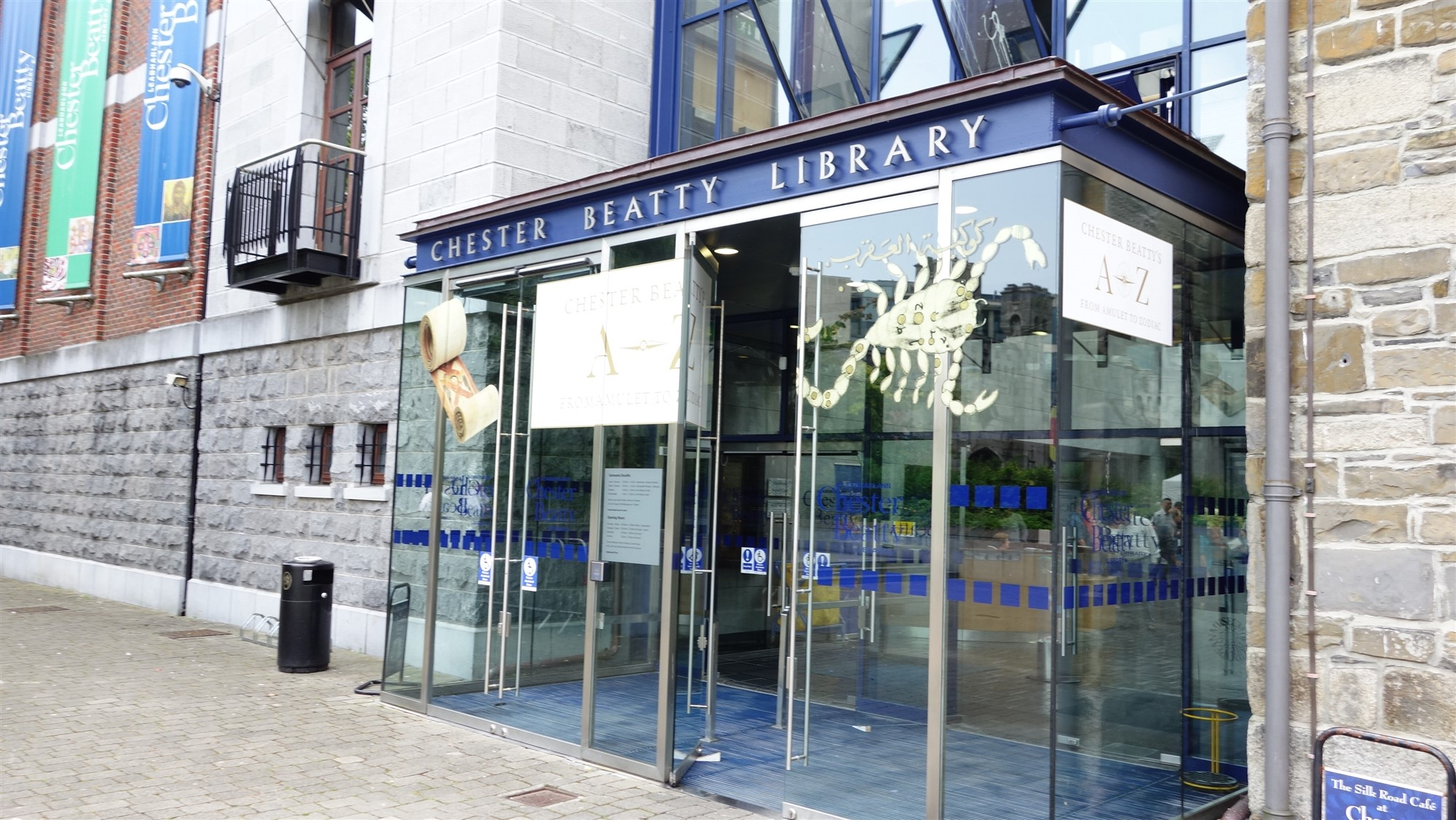
Door to the Chester Beatty Library in Dublin

Beatty had supported the war effort, contributing a large amount of raw materials to the Allies. He received a belated knighthood by Elizabeth II in the 1954 Birthday Honours for his contribution to the wartime effort.

By the late 1940s, however, he had become disillusioned with Britain. Political deviations from his free-market values, coupled with increased foreign exchange restrictions impacted both his personal and collecting interests in Britain. Though he had initially envisioned deepening his relationship with the British Museum by donating his collection in its entirety (he had personally funded many of the museum acquisitions, and received expert consultations from the curators), he changed his mind when the new director insisted on deciding for himself whether his collection met the museum's quality standards. The director also would not assure him that his collection would remain intact, rather than being parcelled out to different departments.

In 1950, at the age of 75, Chester Beatty handed over the reins of Selection Trust to his son Chester Jr and relocated to Dublin, taking many by surprise. The reason often cited is Beatty's growing frustration with post-war Britain, not least the defeat of the Conservative party in the 1945 general election. Having committed himself to the Allied war effort during the Second World War and served on a number of Churchill's committees, he was shocked by the Labour party victory. He told a meeting of stockholders that London was no longer the centre of the mining world and that "the position would deteriorate while high taxation, unjust duties and rigid controls stopped new mining projects being launched". There were other, personal, considerations, however, and his old spirit of adventure surely played a part. His son had bought a home in County Kildare in 1948, which probably prompted Beatty to look favourably on Ireland as a home, especially given his Irish roots: both his paternal grandparents were born in Ireland. Beatty was also seriously considering long-term plans for his collection. Concerned that it would be dispersed if he were to leave it to a large institution, he found another solution. His purpose-built library on Shrewsbury Road in a suburb of Dublin opened in 1953, first for researchers and later to the public.

Beatty bought a large townhouse for himself on Ailesbury Road in the Ballsbridge area of Dublin, Ireland, and a site on nearby Shrewsbury Road, also in Ballsbridge, for the construction of the Chester Beatty Library. The library, which housed his collection, opened on 8 August 1953. It was moved to its current location at Dublin Castle on 7 February 2000, the one hundred and twenty fifth anniversary of Beatty's birth and was named European Museum of the Year two years later.

Beatty spent the remainder of his life between Dublin and the South of France. He was made a Freeman of Dublin in 1954 and was the first person granted honorary citizenship of Ireland in 1957. He continued to collect in the 1950s and 1960s, acquiring important Ethiopian manuscripts and Japanese printed material during that period.

The Chester Beatty Library on Shrewsbury Road and the collection it housed was bequeathed to a trust on behalf of the people of Ireland. In 2000, it opened in its current location, the 18th-century Clock Tower building in the grounds of Dublin Castle.

== Personal life ==
Beatty married his first wife, Grace Madeleine "Ninette" Rickard, the sister-in-law of his mentor T. A. Rickard, in Denver, Colorado, on 18 April 1900. The couple bought a home in East New York, Brooklyn. They had two children together: a daughter, Ninette "Little Ninette" Beatty, was born on 1 January 1901, and a son, Alfred Chester Beatty Jr., was born on 17 October 1907.

On 23 March 1911, his wife died suddenly of typhoid fever in Manhattan, New York City. She was 31. Her funeral service took place at All Angels' Church on 31 March 1911.

Beatty purchased Baroda House in Kensington Palace Gardens in 1912 and moved to London with his two younger children the following year.

Beatty married his second wife, Edith Dunn (formerly Stone), at Kensington Register Office in Kensington in April 1913. His wife was a racehorse owner and breeder, and well-known for her collection of Impressionist, Post-Impressionist and Modernist paintings, antique French furniture and objet d'art.

Beatty, his wife and his daughter traveled by boat to Japan and China in 1917, while he was recovering from a bout of pneumonia and Spanish influenza.

In 1929, his daughter married Captain Edward Newling , at Westminster Cathedral in St. George Hanover Square, London. They had a daughter together, Anne Quie (née Newling). In 1970, two years after his death, his elder granddaughter married Leslie Clive Annesley Quie in Croydon, Greater London.

In 1933, his son married Elizabeth Pamela Belas, in East Ashford, Kent. They had a daughter together, Sarah Anne Chester Beatty. In 1956, his younger granddaughter married David Greville, 8th Earl of Warwick, heir to the Warwick Castle estate, in Chelsea, London, less than 24 hours after the announcement of their engagement. They had two children together; Guy Greville, 9th Earl of Warwick and Lady Charlotte Anne Fraser (née Greville). His great-grandson had two sons and his great-granddaughter had two daughters. From 1971 to 1973, she was married to the Polish prince and architect, Kasimir Korybut. She was the widow of the racehorse trainer, Harry Thomson Jones, whom she married in 1975.

Beatty is the sitter in eight portraits at the National Portrait Gallery. His son is the sitter in one portrait at the National Portrait Gallery.

In 1937, his son married Enid Groome in Westminster, Middlesex. They later divorced.

On 5 August 1952, his wife died at their home in Kensington Palace Gardens, aged 66.

In 1953, his son married Helen Gertrude Casalis De Pury (née Markowicz) in Brentford, Middlesex.

Beatty received an honorary Legum Doctor degree from the National University of Ireland.

=== Death ===
Beatty died at the Princess Grace Polyclinic in Monte Carlo, Monaco, on 19 January 1968, following a short illness. He was 92. His funeral service took place at St Patrick's Cathedral, Dublin on 29 January 1968, followed by a state funeral, accorded by the Government of Ireland, to Glasnevin Cemetery in Glasnevin, where he was buried. His Irish estate was valued at GB£7M.
