= Papyrus Chester Beatty VI =

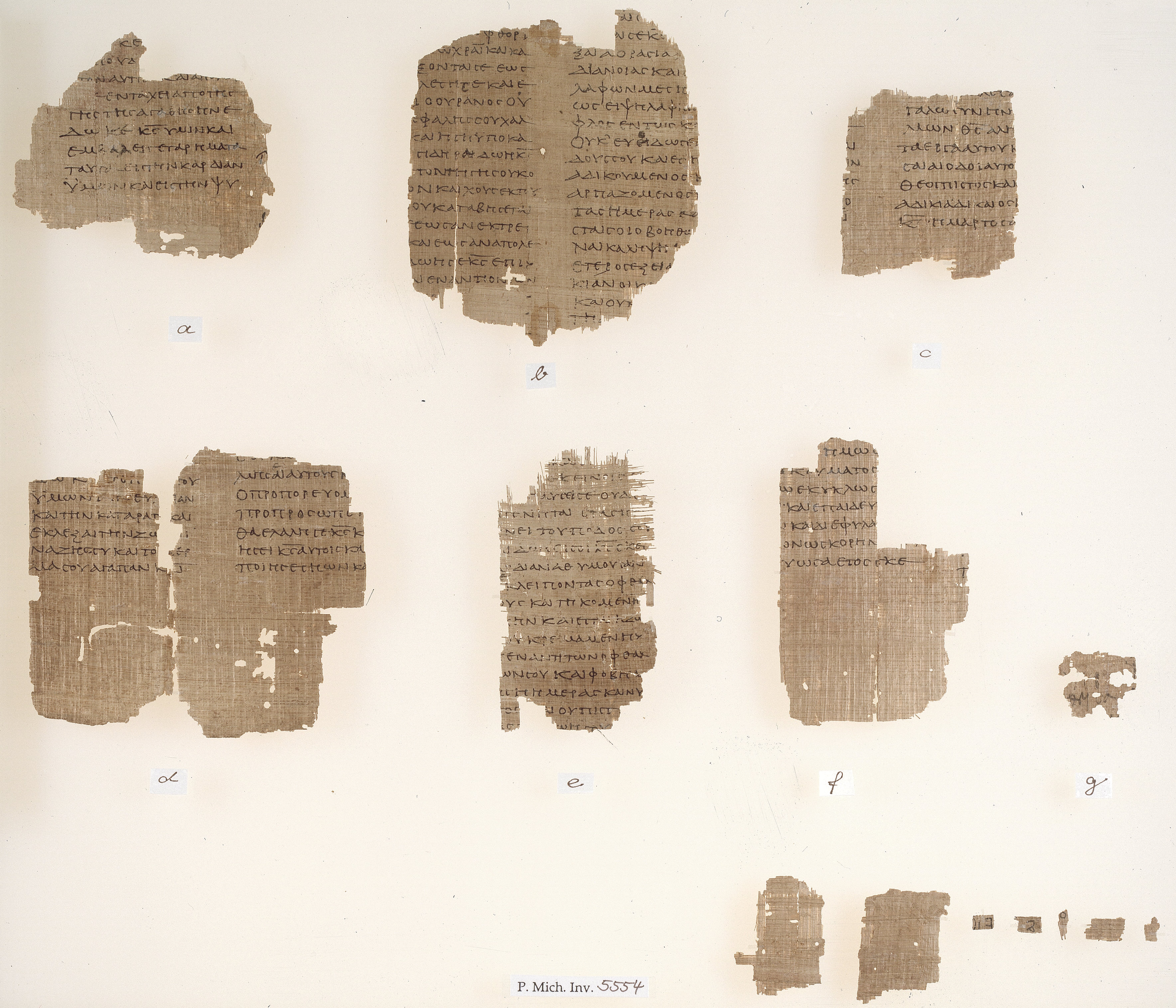
Papyrus Chester Beatty VI, fragments of Deuteronomy 4 located in Michigan

The Papyrus Chester Beatty VI (also signed as Rahlfs 963, Michigan.apis.2494, 6 P. Beatty 6) are fragments of a papyrus manuscript of the Greek Septuagint (an early translation of the Hebrew Bible into Greek) and one of the Chester Beatty papyri. It contains parts of the Book of Numbers and Deuteronomy. Using the study of comparative writing styles (palaeography), it has been dated to 200 CE.

== Description ==
Manuscript

The manuscript is a codex (precursor to the modern book), which has survived in only 50 mostly damaged leaves, written in small uncials in an expertise script. The manuscript contains the book of Numbers chapters 5, 13, 25 and Deuteronomy 1, 9–12; 18; 19; 27–34.

Text

The text of Numbers is similar to the text of Codex Vaticanus (B), the text of the Deuteronomy to Codex Colberto-Sarravianus (G) and Codex Washingtonensis (Θ).

Version

This manuscript is important for containing substantial portions of Deuteronomy and predates Codex Vaticanus (B) by almost 200 years. It also contains the name Joshua written as a nomen sacrum, due to the Greek Ἰησοῦς being the same for both the names Joshua and Jesus.

=== History ===
The fragments were acquired in Egypt before the end of 1931 by the American collector Alfred Chester Beatty. Most of the fragments are in the Chester Beatty Library in Dublin with the shelf number P. Ch. Beatty VI, and some are in the Ann Arbor Library of the University of Michigan in Ann Arbor, shelf number P. Mich. Inv. 5554.

== Sources ==
- Crowe, Brandon D. (2012). The Obedient Son: Deuteronomy and Christology in the Gospel of Matthew. Beihefte zur Zeitschrift für die neutestamentliche Wissenschaft. Vol. 188. Walter de Gruyter. ISBN 9783110279917.
- Aland, Kurt (1975). Repertorium der griechischen christlichen Papyri I. Biblische Papyri: Altes Testament, Neues Testament, Varia, Apokryphen. Patristische Texte und Studien. Vol. 18. Berlin; New York: Walter de Gruyter. pp. 20–22, 92–93. ISBN 3-11-004674-1.
- Kenyon, Frederic G. (1933). "Fasciculus I: General Introduction". The Chester Beatty Biblical Papyri. Descriptions and Texts of Twelve Manuscripts on Papyrus of the Greek Bible. London: Emery Walker Ltd.
- Kenyon, Frederic G. (1939). "963. Papyrus Chester Beatty VI". Our Bible and the ancient manuscripts. Vol. 4. London: Auflage, Eyre & Spottiswoode.
- Rahlfs, Alfred; Fraenkel, Detlef (2004). Verzeichnis der griechischen Handschriften des Alten Testaments: Die Überlieferung bis zum VIII. Jahrhundert. Septuaginta. Vetus Testamentum Graecum. Supplementum (in German). Vol. 1. Göttingen: Vandenhoeck & Ruprecht. p. 94. ISBN 3-525-53447-7.
- ISAW. "6 P. Beatty 6 = Trismegistos 61934 = LDAB 3091 = michigan.apis.2494". The Duke Collaboratory for Classics Computing & the Institute for the Study of the Ancient World.
- Sanders, Paul (1996). Provenance of Deuteronomy Thirty-two. Oudtestamentische Studiėn, Old Testament Studies / Social, Economic, and Political Studies of the Middle East. Vol. 37. BRILL. ISBN 9789004106482.
