= Apocryphon of Ezekiel =

Jewish text written between 50BCE–70CE asserting bodily resurrection

The Apocryphon of Ezekiel is an apocryphal book, written in the style of the Old Testament, as revelations of Ezekiel. It survives only in five fragments including quotations in writings by Epiphanius, Clement of Rome and Clement of Alexandria, and the Chester Beatty Papyri 185. It is likely to have been composed c. 50 BC – 50 AD, although some scholars suggest a date closer to 7 AD.

The largest fragment tells of a king who holds a feast to which he invites everyone except two beggars, a blind man and a cripple. The two are angry and determine to have their revenge: the cripple sits on the blind man's shoulders, and together they damage the king's orchard, but the king discovers what they have done and punishes them both. The moral of the story, according to the narrator, is that this proves the resurrection of the body, since soul and body must function together.

Pseudo-Ezekiel, one of the Dead Sea Scrolls, is possibly further fragments of this text, or it may be a different work concerning Ezekiel, but it is unclear.

== Bibliography ==
- Michael E. Stone, Benjamin G. Wright, David Satran (eds.), The Apocryphal Ezechiel, Atlanta, Society of Biblical Literature, 2000.
- W. Milton Timmons, "Everything About the Bible That You Never Had Time to Look Up", p. 192
- Travis Darren Trost, "Who Should Be King in Israel?", p. 157
- Mercer dictionary of the Bible: Ezekiel, p. 283
