= Susanna and the Elders (Altdorfer) =

Painting by Albrecht Altdorfer

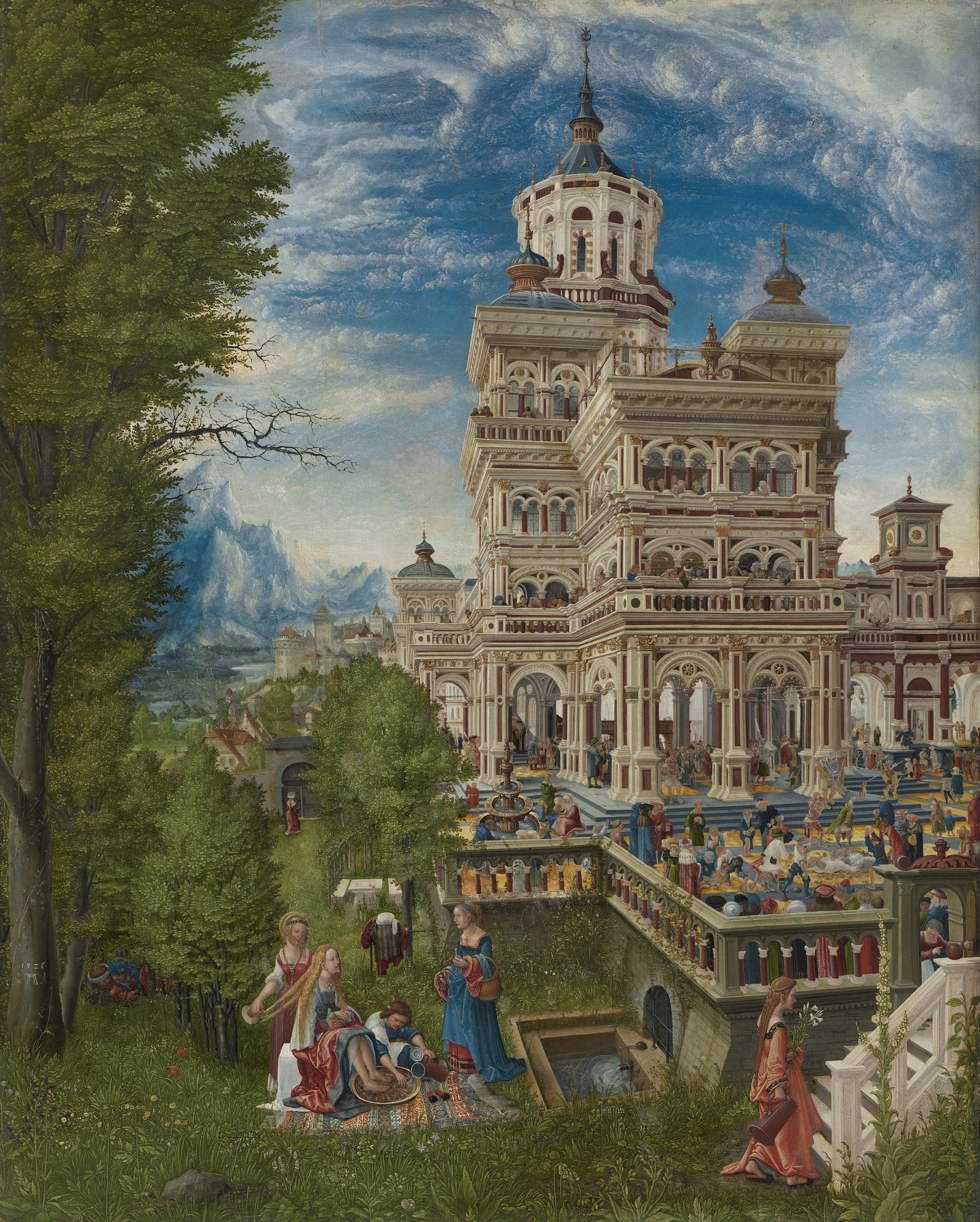
- Artist: Albrecht Altdorfer
- Year: 1526
- Medium: oil on panel
- Dimensions: 74.8 cm × 61.2 cm (29.4 in × 24.1 in)
- Location: Alte Pinakothek, Munich

Susanna and the Elders is an oil-on-wood painting by the German artist Albrecht Altdorfer, created in 1526 and now held in the Alte Pinakothek in Munich. The subject is the Old Testament story of Susanna bathing.

== Description ==
The majority of artists who depicted the story of Susanna's bath used the opportunity to paint a female nude. Altdorfer has chosen a more secular approach which is the rare exception.

Altdorfer puts the main emphasis on the representation of the palace of Jehoiakim with extensive terraces and adjacent gardens. The cloisters, halls, and terraces are filled with people doing everything, from talking to having fun and eating. Among these details, the artist placed various threads of the same story. On the left, in the distance, Susanna is walking to the pool to take a bath. On the same side, in the foreground, Susanna appears surrounded by her four maids, seated while washing her feet, and one of her maids combs her hair. On the left side, in the bushes, barely visible, are the two old men watching the girl's toilet.

On the right side of the canvas, Susanna in a red dress goes to the palace. She is holding a white lily in her hand, a symbol of innocence, here referring to Susanna, who remained chaste and did not succumb to the persuasion of the elders. At the right, the narrative concludes with the stoning of the elders as a punishment for their lie. The stoning scene is watched by onlookers from the windows.

== See also ==
- List of landscapes by Albrecht Altdorfer

== Bibliography ==
- (in German) Jacques Bonnet: Die Badende – Voyeurismus in der abendländischen Kunst. Parthas Verlag, Berlin 2006, ISBN 978-3-86601-088-8.
- (in German) Rudolf Reiser: Albrecht Altdorfer – der politische Maler. Der Meister der Donauschule stellt uns ‚Susanna im Bade‘ (Alte Pinakothek) 1526 als Regensburgerin zwischen Heimatfrieden und Türkenkriegen vor. In: Konrad Maria Färber (Hrsg.): Die Sechziger lassen grüßen. Regensburger Almanach. MZ Buchverlag, Regensburg 2011, ISBN 978-3-934863-48-4, S. 164–171.
