= Papyrus 967 =

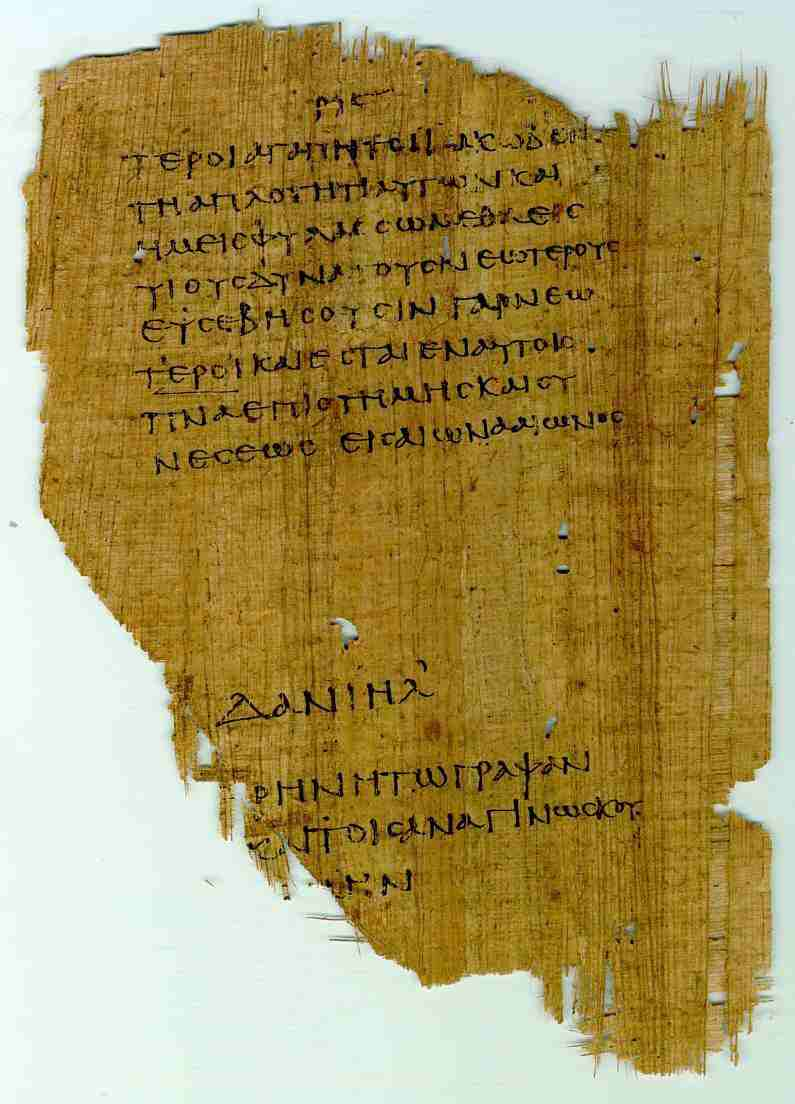
P. Köln Theol. 37v (Susanna 62a-62b)

Papyrus 967 (also signed as TM 61933, LDAB 3090) is a 3rd-century CE biblical manuscript, discovered in 1931. It is notable for containing fragments of the original Septuagint text of the Book of Daniel, which was completely superseded by a revised text by the end of the 4th century and elsewhere survives only in Syriac translation and in Codex Chisianus 88. The manuscript is also important for early variants, both in the text of the Book of Ezekiel and of the Book of Daniel.

The exact circumstances of the find are unclear, but the ancient Aphroditopolis is assumed to be the place where it was found.

== Description ==
The scope was originally 59 sheets, which corresponds to 118 leaves or 236 pages. One side measures approximately 344 mm × 128 mm (13 1/2 in × 5 in). The pages are written in one column with an average of 42 lines in a square uncial.

The book of Daniel already contains a chapter division in Greek letters. These numbers, entered as a subscriptio, were not added later, but were already present in the original text.

=== Corrections ===
For the Ezekiel text, a writer who differs from the Daniel and Esther texts can be identified. Various corrections by the scribe and later hands are entered. The text contains nomina sacra as well as text-critical signs to indicate the readings according to Theodotion.

=== Version ===
In addition to the special readings that the text offers for Ezekiel, above all, the early attestation of the Septuagint text on Daniel is significant, since this was later superseded by the Theodotion text in almost all manuscripts. However, Kristin De Troyer reports that some scholars believe that it is a revised text.

=== Variants ===
In Papyrus 967 the story of Susanna in the bath (Dan 13) follows the story of Bel and the dragon (Dan 14). In addition, the chapters Dan 7f. before chapter 5f. classified. Papyrus 967 has Ezekiel before Daniel as does Codex Alexandrinus, while Codex Chisianus R.VII.45 (Rahlfs siglum 88) and Syrohexaplarian Codex Ambrosianus C. 313 Inf. have Ezekiel after Daniel.

The final wish at the end of the book of Daniel is also interesting (including the Susanna story that closes the book of Daniel here; see the fig.). After the summary "Daniel" follows the wish: "Peace to him who wrote and to those who read". Since the book of Esther follows from the hand of the same scribe, the desire for completion at this point probably does not come from the scribe, but from tradition. This perhaps reflects an old canon boundary, to which the book of Esther (long disputed) was added.

== Location ==
The surviving 59 manuscript pages of P 967 are at present kept in five different places.

- 29 foll. in Chester Beatty Library (Dublin) as Chester Beatty IX-X: At the first review of the papyrus in 1933, fragments of Ezekiel and Esther were interpreted as belonging to an independent papyrus as those of Daniel and were given the number IX, and the obsolete Rahlfs number "P 968".
- 21 foll. as John H. Scheide Papyrus 3 in Princeton University Library
- Substantial portions are kept by Cologne University Library
- 2 foll. in Santa Maria de Montserrat Abbey, Barcelona as Scriptorium Biblicum et Orientale P Barc. Inv. 42 + 43
- Several foll. in Madrid, as Fundación Pastor de Estudios Clásicos, P Matr. 1

== Editions ==
- Angelo Geißen: Der Septuagintatext des Buches Daniel, Kap 5–12, zusammen mit Susanna, Bel et Draco, sowie Esther 1,1a–2,15 nach dem Kölner Teil des Papyrus 967. Papyrologische Texte und Abhandlungen 5. Bonn 1968.
- Winfried Hamm, Papyrologische Texte und Abhandlungen 10/21 (1969, 1977)
- Leopold Günther Jahn: Der griechische Text des Buches Ezechiel nach dem Kölner Teil des Papyrus 967. Papyrologische Texte und Abhandlungen 15. Bonn 1972.
- Allan Ch. Johnson; Henry S. Gehman; Edmund H. Kase: The John H. Scheide Biblical Papyri: Ezekiel (Princeton Studies in Papyrology 3). Princeton 1938.
- Frederic G. Kenyon: The Chester Beatty Biblical Papyri VII: Ezekiel, Daniel, Esther. Text. London 1937. Plates. London 1938.
- Information and photos of the Cologne part: P 967: Ezechiel - Daniel - Bel et Draco - Susanna - Esther

== Sources ==
- De Troyer, Kristin (2006). "The Choice is Yours! On Names of God". Journal of the European Society of Women in Theological Research. 14: 53–66. doi:10.2143/ESWTR.14.0.2019306.
- M. Fernandez Galliano: "Notes on the Madrid Ezekiel Papyrus", In: Bulletin of the American Schools of Oriental Research (BASOR), 5 (1968), 349–356.
- Siegfried Kreuzer: Papyrus 967. Bemerkungen zu seiner buchtechnischen, textgeschichtlichen und kanongeschichtlichen Bedeutung, in: Martin Karrer; Wolfgang Kraus (Hg.): Die Septuaginta. Texte, Kontexte, Lebenswelten, WUNT 219, Tübingen 2008, 64–82; English version: Siegfried Kreuzer, Papyrus 967. Its Significance for Codex Formation, Textual History, and Canon History. In: Siegfried Kreuzer, The Bible in Greek. Translation, Transmission, and Theology of the Septuagint, SBL.SCS 63, Atlanta GA 2015, 255–271.
- Silvio S. Scatolini Apóstolo: Ezek 36, 37, 38 and 39 in Papyrus 967 as Pre-Text for Re-Reading Ezekiel. In: Florentino García Martínez; Marc Vervenne (ed.): Interpreting Translation: Studies on the LXX and Ezekiel in Honour of Johan Lust (BEThL 192). Leuven 2005, 331–357.
- Peter Schwagmeier: Untersuchungen zu Textgeschichte und Entstehung des Ezechielbuchs in masoretischer und griechischer Überlieferung. Diss. theol. Zürich 2004.
- Joseph Ziegler: Die Bedeutung des Chester Beatty-Scheide Papyrus 967 für die Textüberlieferung der Ezechiel-Septuaginta. In: ZAW 61 (1945/48), S. 76–94.
- Alfred Rahlfs and Detlef Fraenkel, Verzeichnis der griechischen Handschriften des Alten Testaments Bd. 1: Die Überlieferung bis zum VIII. Jahrhundert, Göttingen: Vandenhoeck & Ruprecht, 2004 p. 99-103.
