= Chester Beatty Medical Papyrus =

The Chester Beatty Medical Papyrus is one of the extant medical papyri, from ancient Egypt. It is dedicated to magical incantations against headaches and remedies for anorectal ailments, and is dated around 1200 BC. Part of the papyri collection of Alfred Chester Beatty, it is sometimes referred to simply as the Chester Beatty Papyri, but should not be confused with the Chester Beatty Biblical Papyri, alias Chester Beatty Papyri.

"Papyrus VI of the Chester Beatty Papyri 46 (Papyrus no. 10686, British Museum) also contains some recipes dealing with anorectal diseases."

== See also ==
- List of ancient Egyptian papyri
