= Papyrus Chester Beatty V =

The Papyrus Chester Beatty V (also named as Rahlfs 962, LDAB 3109, TM 61952, TC OT11, vHTR 7 and Rep I AT 4) is a fragment of a Greek Septuagint (an early translation of the Hebrew Old Testament into Greek) manuscript written on papyrus. It belongs to the Chester Beatty papyri. Using the study of comparative writing style (palaeography), it has been dated to the late 3rd century CE.

== Description ==
Twenty-seven leaves are preserved, of which 17 are in good condition and the other 10 are fragments. It contains portions of Genesis (8:13-9:1; 24:13-25:21 and 30:24-46:33) in Koine Greek. The text is written in single columns in cursive script. It is the oldest testimony of these passages in the Egyptian version of the Septuagint text.

== Actual location ==
The fragments were acquired in Egypt before the end of 1931 by the American collector Alfred Chester Beatty and are now in the Chester Beatty Library in Dublin with the siglum P. Ch. Beatty V.

== Sources ==
- Reviews by Kilpatrick, G. D. (1984). ""Chester Beatty Biblical Papyri IV and V. New Edition with Text-critical Analysis" by A. Pietersma, xii+203 pages, 8 plates. (American Studies in Papyrology XVI.) Toronto and Sarasota: Samuel Stevens Hakkert and Company, 1977. "Two Manuscripts of the Greek Psalter in the Chester Beatty Library, Dublin" by A. Pietersma, x+79 pages, 10 plates. (Analecta Biblica, 77.) Rome: Biblical Institute Press, 1978. "Étude sur la LXX origénienne du Psautier" by M. Caloz, 480 pages (Orbis Biblicus et Orientalis, 19.) Fribourg Suisse: Éditions Universitaires; Göttingen: Vandenhoeck & Ruprecht, 1978". The Journal of Theological Studies. 35 (1): 214–220. doi:10.1093/jts/35.1.214.
- Mugridge, Alan (2016). Copying Early Christian Texts: A study of scribal practice. Wissenschaftliche Untersuchungen zum Neuen Testament. Vol. 32. ISBN 9783161546884.
- Pietersma, Albert (1977). Chester Beatty Biblical Papyri IV and V: A New Edition with Text-critical Analysis. American studies in papyrology, ISSN 0569-8642. Vol. 16. American Society of Papyrlogists. ISBN 9780888660169.
- Robinson, James M. (2013). The Story of the Bodmer Papyri: From the First Monastery's Library in Upper Egypt to Geneva and Dublin. James Clarke & Company Limited. ISBN 9780227903506.
