= Chester Beatty Papyri =

Collection of 3rd-century Christian manuscripts

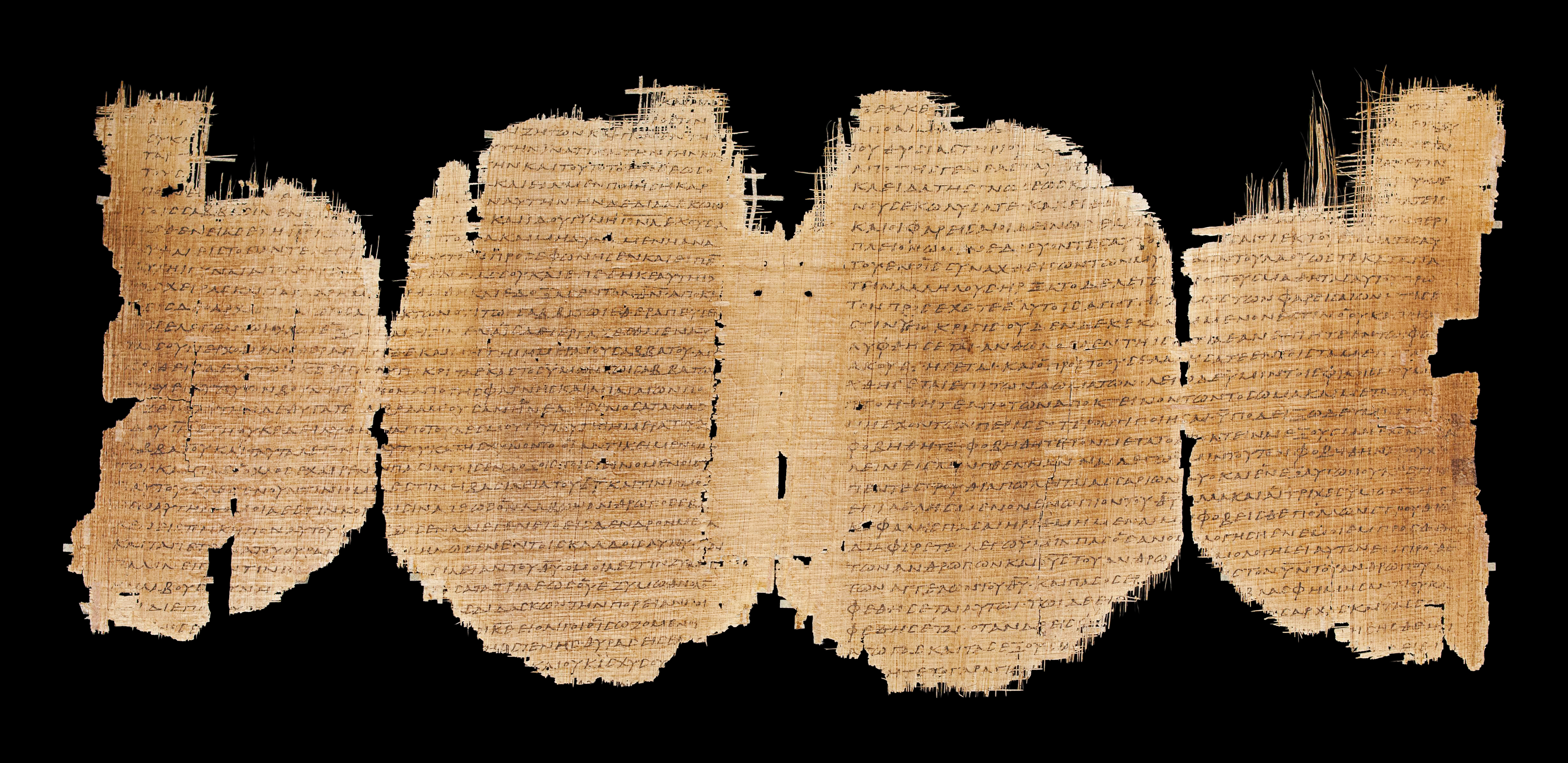
P. Chester Beatty I, (𝔓^{45}) folio 13–14, containing portion of the Gospel of Luke

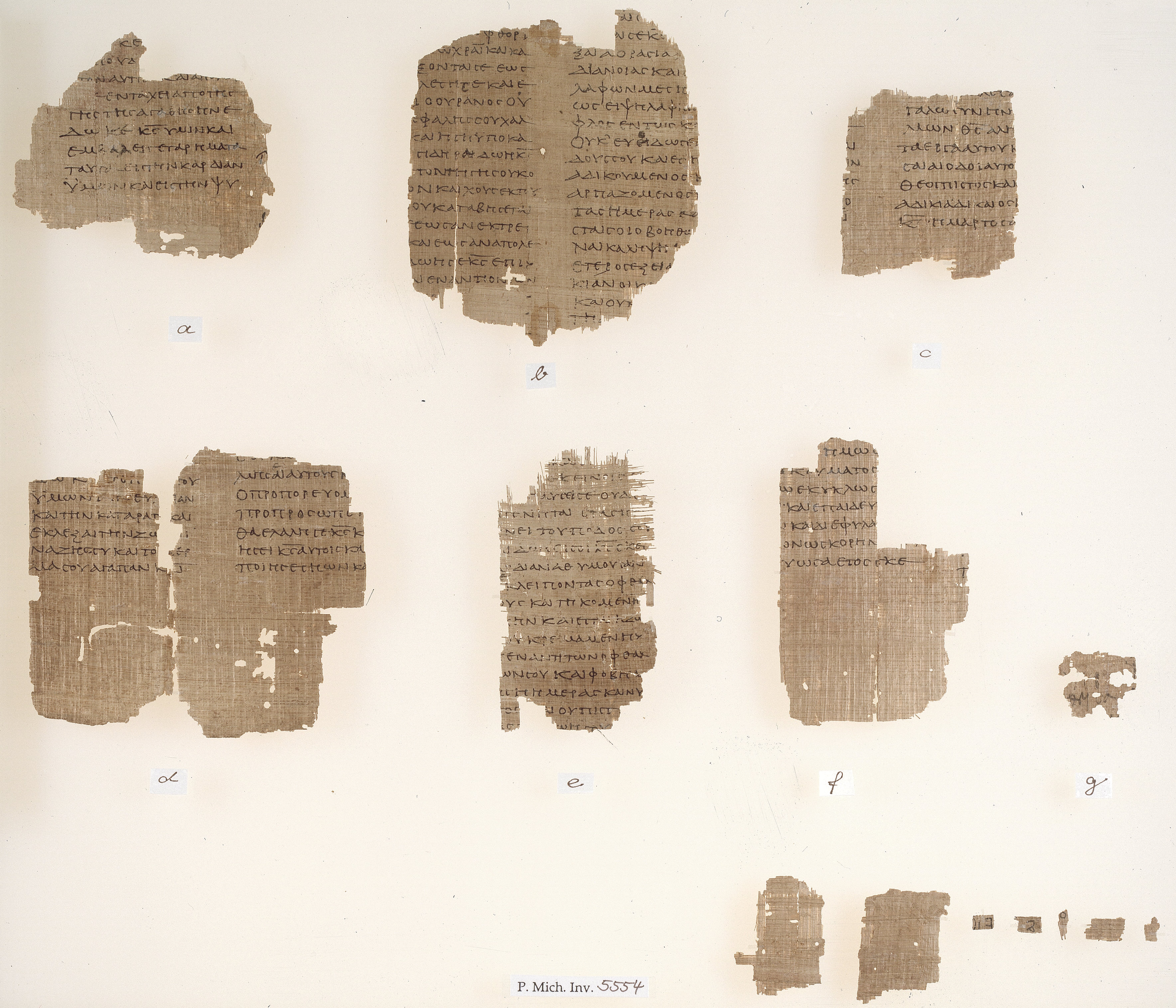
Fragments of P. Chester Beatty VI showing portions of Deuteronomy

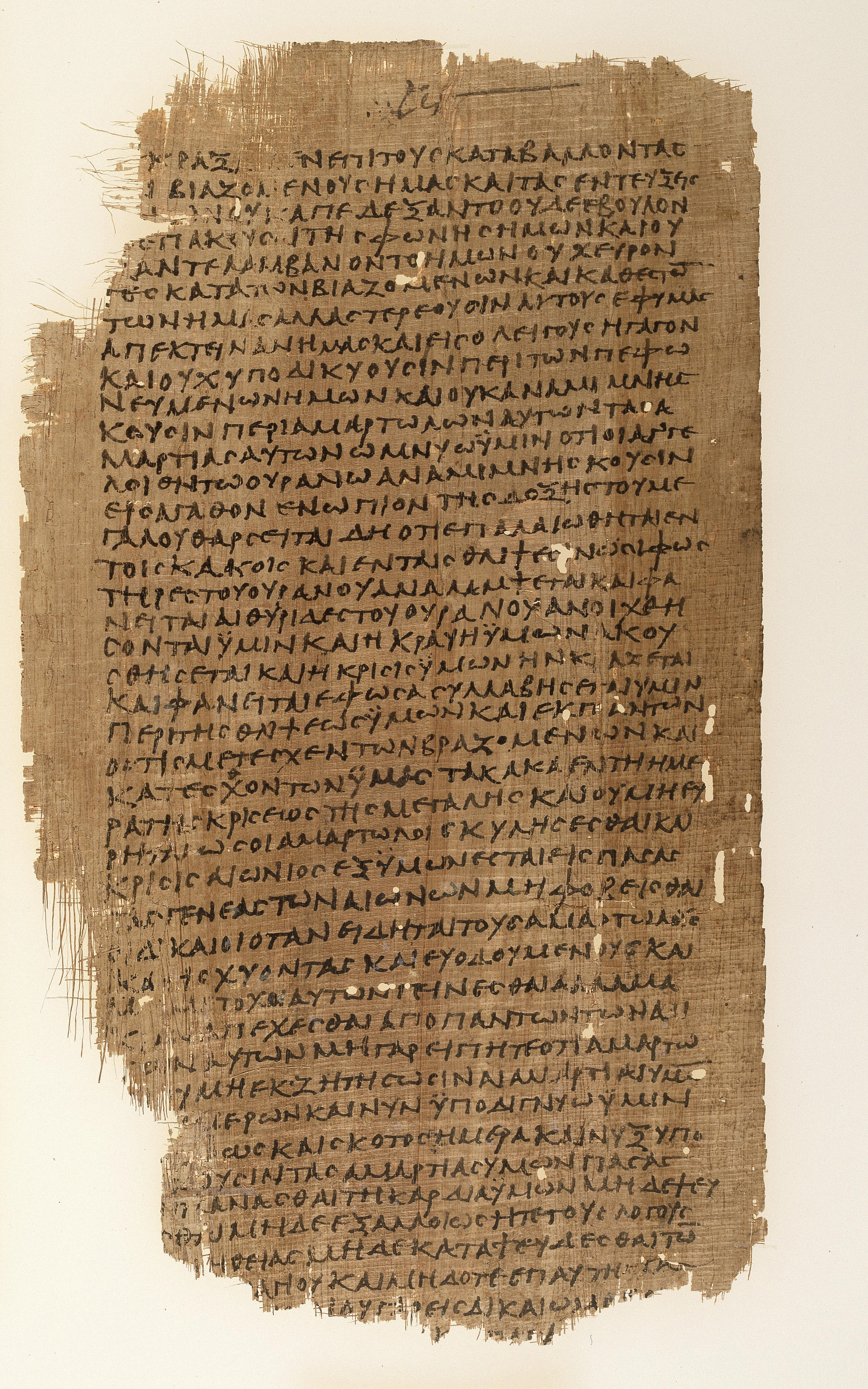
P. Chester Beatty XII, folio 3, verso, currently housed at the University of Michigan

The Chester Beatty Biblical Papyri or simply the Chester Beatty Papyri are a group of early papyrus manuscripts of biblical texts. The manuscripts are in Greek and are of Christian origin. There are eleven manuscripts in the group, seven consisting of portions of Old Testament books, three consisting of portions of the New Testament (referred to with the Gregory-Aland no. (a list of New Testament manuscripts) 𝔓^{45}, 𝔓^{46}, and 𝔓^{47}), and one consisting of portions of the Book of Enoch and an unidentified Christian homily. Most are dated to the 3rd century CE. They are housed in part at the Chester Beatty Library in Dublin, Ireland, and in part at the University of Michigan, among a few other locations.

The papyri were most likely first obtained by dealers in illegal antiquities. Because of this, the exact circumstances of the find are not clear. One account states that the manuscripts were in jars in a Coptic graveyard near the ruins of the ancient city of Aphroditopolis. Other theories have proposed that the collection was found near the Fayum instead of Aphroditopolis, or that the location was a Christian church or monastery instead of a graveyard. Most of the papyri were bought from a dealer by Alfred Chester Beatty, after whom the manuscripts are named, although some leaves and fragments were acquired by the University of Michigan and a few other collectors and institutions.

The papyri were first announced on November 19, 1931, although more leaves were acquired over the next decade. Biblical scholar Frederic G. Kenyon published the manuscripts in The Chester Beatty Biblical Papyri: Descriptions and Texts of Twelve Manuscripts on Papyrus of the Greek Bible, in an 8-volume work that spanned 1933–58. The papyri are usually catalogued as P. Chester Beatty followed by a corresponding Roman numeral between I-XII, one for each manuscript.

The term Chester Beatty Papyri can also generally refer to the collection of manuscripts that Alfred Chester Beatty acquired over his lifetime, which include non-Biblical papyri such as the Chester Beatty Medical Papyrus.

At the time of their discovery, biblical scholar F. F. Bruce stated they "may fairly be claimed as the greatest discovery of Biblical manuscripts since Tischendorf discovered the Codex Sinaiticus".

== Character of the collection ==
All of the manuscripts are codices, which was surprising to the first scholars who examined the texts because it was believed that the papyrus codex was not extensively used by Christians until the 4th century. Most of the manuscripts dated to the 3rd century, with some as early as the 2nd. The manuscripts also helped scholars understand the construction of papyrus codices. There is significant variation between the construction of each manuscript. Page size ranges from about 14 by 24.2 cm (P. III) to 18 by 33 cm (P. VI). Some of the manuscripts were constructed of a single gathering (quire) of papyrus sheets (Pap. II, VII, IX + X), while in others the gathering varies from a single sheet (I) to five (V) or seven (VII). The largest codex (P. IX/X) is believed to have contained roughly 236 pages.

The manuscripts employ nomina sacra, special abbreviations for names/words considered sacred in Christianity. One notable example is in P. VI which contains portions of the Old Testament. The name Joshua which relates linguistically to Jesus was considered a sacred name and abbreviated as such.

Since all but two (P. XI, XII) of the eleven manuscripts are dated before the 4th century, they present significant textual evidence for the Greek Bible as it existed in Egypt prior to the Diocletian persecutions, where Christian books are said to have been destroyed and a century or more earlier than the Codex Vaticanus and Codex Sinaiticus. Although some of the scholars who first studied the collection considered some of the New Testament manuscripts, especially P. Chester Beatty I (𝔓^{45}) to be of the apparent Caesarean text-type, this has little support today. The textual character is generally described as being eclectic, mixed, or unaligned. The manuscripts provided many new textual variations, especially since the Old Testament manuscripts predated the revision activity of Lucian and Origen and others, and the New Testament manuscripts are some of the earliest yet quite extensive examples of the corresponding books.

== Old Testament manuscripts ==
Originally, there were believed to be eight manuscripts in the Chester Beatty collection containing portions of the Old Testament. However, what was believed to be two different manuscripts actually belonged to the same codex, resulting in a total of seven Old Testament manuscripts in the collection, all following the text of the Septuagint (an early Greek translation of the Old Testament).

- P. IV and V – Two manuscripts that contain portions of Genesis, one dated to the late 3rd century, and one to the early 4th century. These manuscripts are significant because the next oldest Greek Old Testament texts of Vaticanus and Sinaiticus have extensive lacunae in Genesis.
- P. VI – A manuscript of the Book of Numbers and Deuteronomy, consisting of around 50 partial leaves out of 108 and many very small fragments, dated to the first half of the 2nd century. It is the earliest manuscript in the collection, but is predated by two other less extensive Greek papyri manuscripts of these books, P. Fouad 266 and P. Rylands 458.
- P. VII – A manuscript of the Book of Isaiah, heavily deteriorated, with Coptic (Old Fayumic) marginal notes, dated to the 3rd century.
- P. VIII – Two fragmentary leaves from the Book of Jeremiah, c. 200.
- P. IX/X – A manuscript of the Books of Ezekiel, Daniel, and Esther, dated to the 3rd century. What remains is 50 out of an original 118 leaves, 29 of which are in the Chester Beatty Library (8 of Ezekiel, 8 of Esther, and 13 of Daniel), and another 21 (of Ezekiel) are in the Princeton University Library. The bottom portions of the leaves are missing. Nonetheless, all parts of the manuscript are the most substantial, early examples of the corresponding books of the Bible. Ezekiel is written in a different handwriting than the other two books. Daniel was originally counted as P. X, because it was mistakenly thought to be a separate manuscript. It was later decided that all three books belong to a single codex. Daniel contains some significant variations regarding the order and omission of certain parts of the text (chapters 7-8 come before 5–6, and parts of chapters 4 and 5 are missing).
- P. XI – Two fragmentary leaves from Ecclesiastes, dated to the 4th century.

== New Testament manuscripts ==
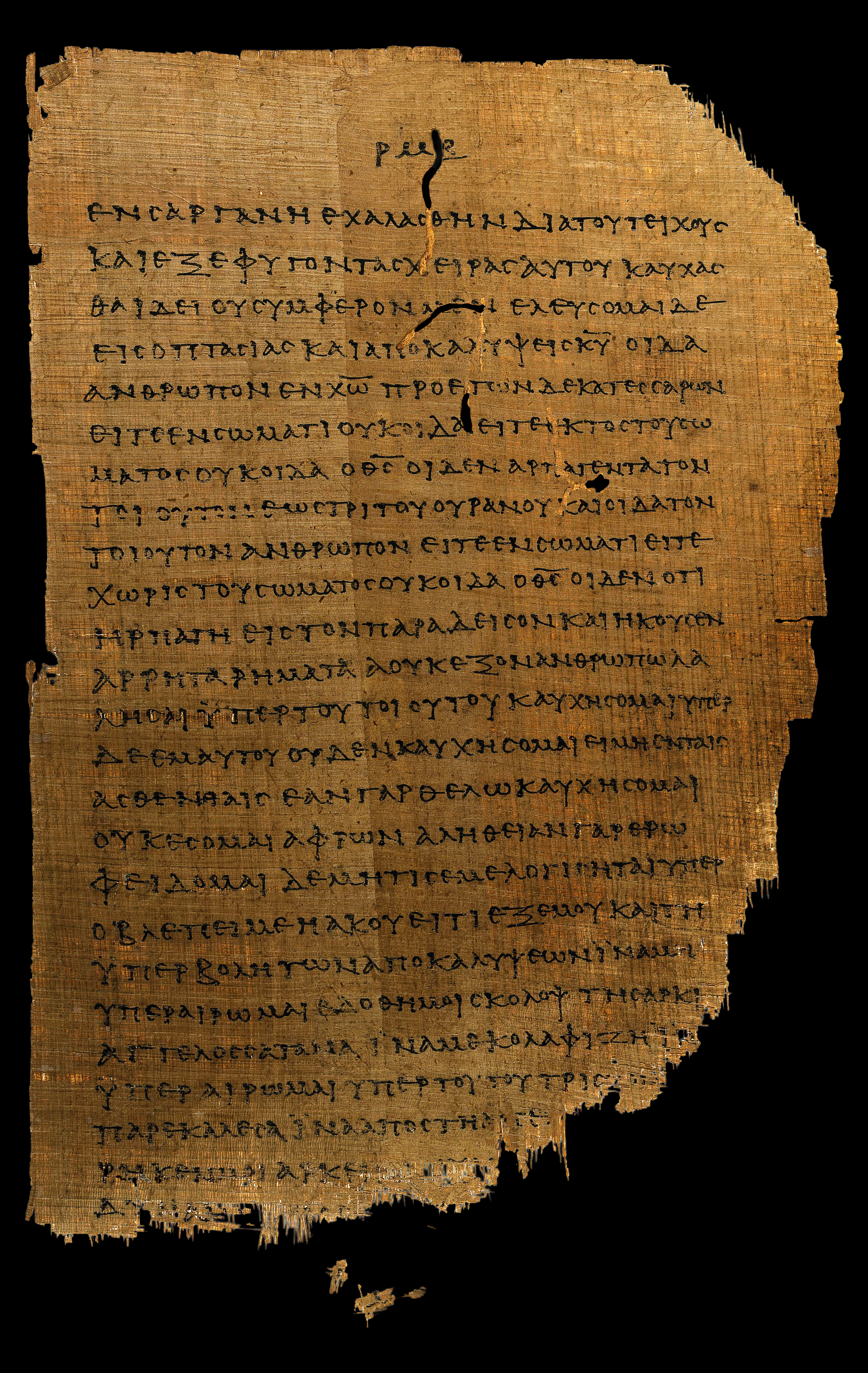
A folio from 𝔓^{46} containing 2 Corinthians 11:33-12:9

There are three New Testament manuscripts that are part of the Chester Beatty Papyri. The first, P. I, is labelled under the Gregory-Åland numbering system as 𝔓^{45}, and was originally a codex of 110 leaves that contained the four canonical gospels and Acts. 30 fragmentary leaves remain, consisting of two small leaves of the Gospel of Matthew chapters 20/21 and 25/26, portions of the Gospel of Mark chapters 4–9, 11–12, portions of the Gospel of Luke 6–7, 9–14, portions of the Gospel of John 4–5, 10–11, and portion of the Acts of the Apostles 4–17. The ordering of the gospels follows the Western tradition, Matthew, John, Luke, Mark, Acts. These fragments are palaeographically dated to the first half of the 3rd century.

𝔓^{46} is the second New Testament manuscript in the Chester Beatty collection (P. II), and was a codex that contained the Pauline Epistles dated to c. 200. What remains today of the manuscript is roughly 85 out of 104 leaves consisting of Romans chapters 5–6, 8–15, all of Hebrews, Ephesians, Galatians, Philippians, Colossians, virtually all of 1–2 Corinthians and 1 Thessalonians 1–2, 5. The leaves have partially deteriorated, resulting in the loss of some lines at the bottom of each folio. The manuscript split up between the Chester Beatty Library and the University of Michigan. Scholars do not believe the Pastoral epistles were included originally in the codex, based on the amount of space required in the missing leaves; they conclude 2 Thessalonians would have occupied the final portion of the codex. The inclusion of Hebrews, a book that was questioned canonically and not considered authored by Paul, is notable. The placement of it following Romans is unique against most other witnesses, as is the ordering of Galatians following Ephesians.

P. III is the last New Testament manuscript, 𝔓^{47}, and contains 10 leaves from the Book of Revelation, chapters 9–17. This manuscript also dates to the 3rd century, and Kenyon describes the handwriting as being "rather rough in character, thick in formation, and with no pretensions to calligraphy."

== Apocrypha manuscript ==
The last manuscript in the Chester Beatty Papyri, XII, contains chapters 97-107 of the Book of Enoch and portions of an unknown Christian homily attributed to Melito of Sardis. The manuscript is placed in the 4th century. The Book of Enoch is listed as "The Epistle of Enoch" in the manuscript. Chapters 105 and 108 are not included, and scholars believe they were later additions. XII is the only Greek witness to certain parts of Enoch. As for the homily, XII was the only known copy of the text at the time of its discovery. Two manuscripts which contain the text, P. Bodmer XIII and P. Oxy. 1600, have since been found. The manuscript also contains the only manuscript witness to the Apocryphon of Ezekiel, although it is cited by Clement of Alexandria (Paedagogus I. ix. 84.2–4). Overall, the handwriting is rough and most likely from a scribe who did not know Greek well. Campbell Bonner of the University of Michigan published this manuscript in his 1937 The Last Chapters of Enoch in Greek and 1940 The Homily on the Passion by Melito Bishop of Sardis.

== See also ==
- List of New Testament papyri
- Bodmer Papyri

== Sources ==
- Kenyon, Frederic G. The Chester Beatty Biblical Papyri: Descriptions and Texts of Twelve Manuscripts on Papyrus of the Greek Bible. London: Emery Walker Ltd., 1933, 1937. Fasciculus I: General Introduction, Fasciculus II: The Gospels and Acts, Fasciculus III, Supplement: Pauline Epistles.
