= Susanna and the Elders (Lotto) =

Painting by Lorenzo Lotto

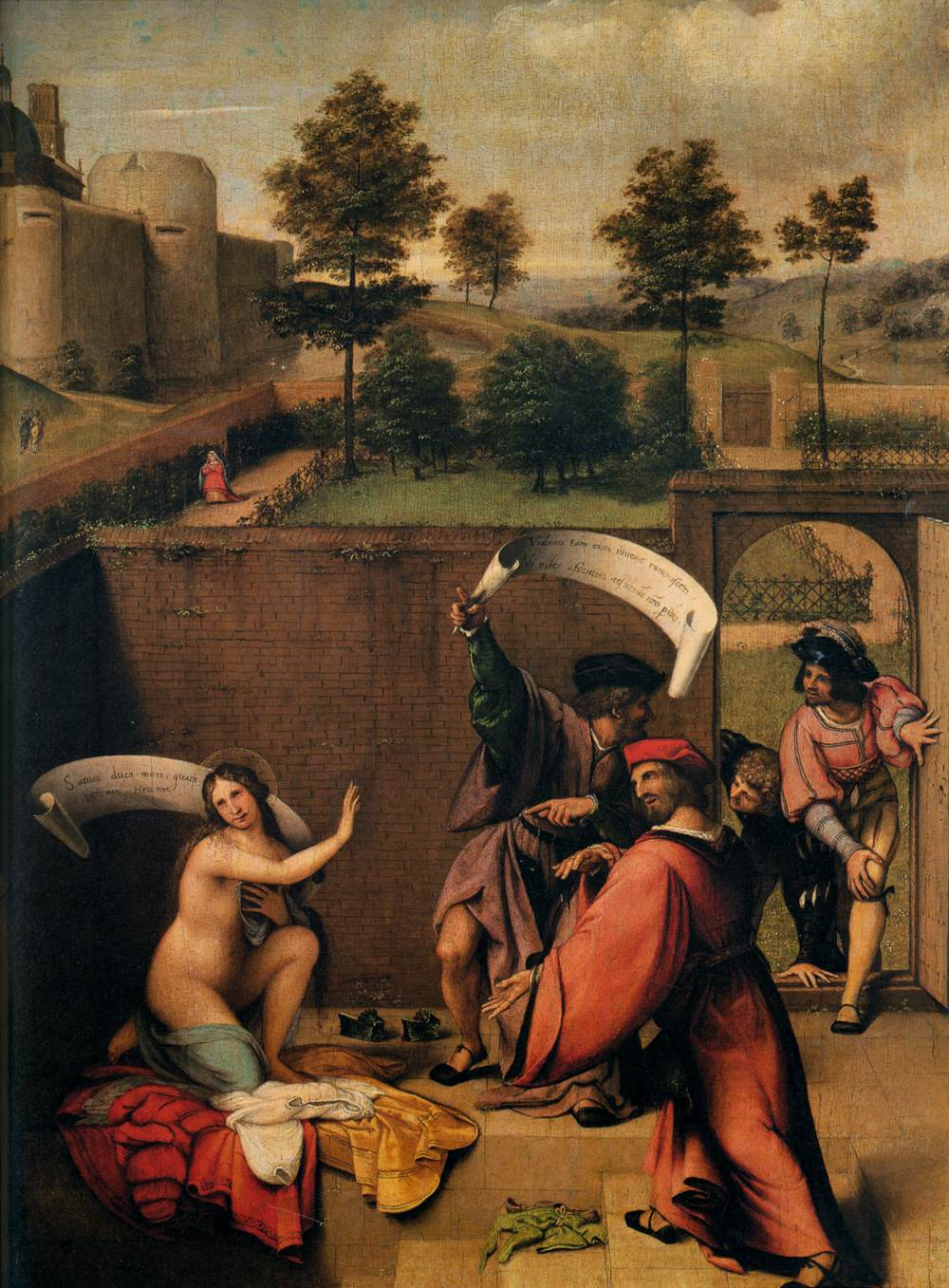
- Artist: Lorenzo Lotto
- Year: 1517
- Medium: Oil on panel
- Dimensions: 66 cm × 51 cm (26 in × 20 in)
- Location: Uffizi Gallery, Florence

Susanna and the Elders is an oil-on-panel painting by the Italian Renaissance painter Lorenzo Lotto, dating from 1517. It is housed in the Uffizi Gallery of Florence.

== History ==
The work has the signature LOTUS PICTOR 1517 and the date places it during Lotto's sojourn in Bergamo. The work was executed perhaps as a private commission. It is likely that it formed a cover for a portrait.

The painting is known in catalogues only from the 20th century, when it was part of the Benson collection [London], which was sold in 1927 by Benson's heirs to Duveen Brothers. At some point the painting was acquired by Alessandro Contini-Bonacossi, for 750 million liras. It was later transferred from his collection to the Uffizi, which now exhibits the painting in the room for Lombard painters.

== Description ==
The painting depicts the story of Susanna from the Old Testament. She was the wife of one Joachim, and received the advances of her husband's friends while taking a bath. After her refusal, the "Elders" accused her of adultery, but the accusation was later proved to be false thanks to the intervention of Daniel.

Lotto portrayed her after removing her clothing for the bath, while the Elders burst in from the door of the bath's enclosure, followed by two serfs called to support their accusation of adultery. The cartouches, showing the characters' dialogue, are an archaic element, perhaps required by the commissioner himself as a complement of the moral message.

Susanna's scroll reads: "Satius duco mori, quam peccare" (I would rather die than sin). The Elders' scroll reads: "Vidimus eam cum iuvene commisceri, ni nobis assenties testimonio nostro peribus" (We bear witness that we have seen her lay with a youth, who then fled.)

The upper part of the picture is occupied by a view of the garden and a castle within an idyllic landscape. A preliminary scene of the episode is shown there, with the woman entering the garden while her two maidens return.

== See also ==
- Susanna and the Elders
