= Susanna and the Elders (Artemisia Gentileschi, private collection) =

Painting by Artemisia Gentileschi

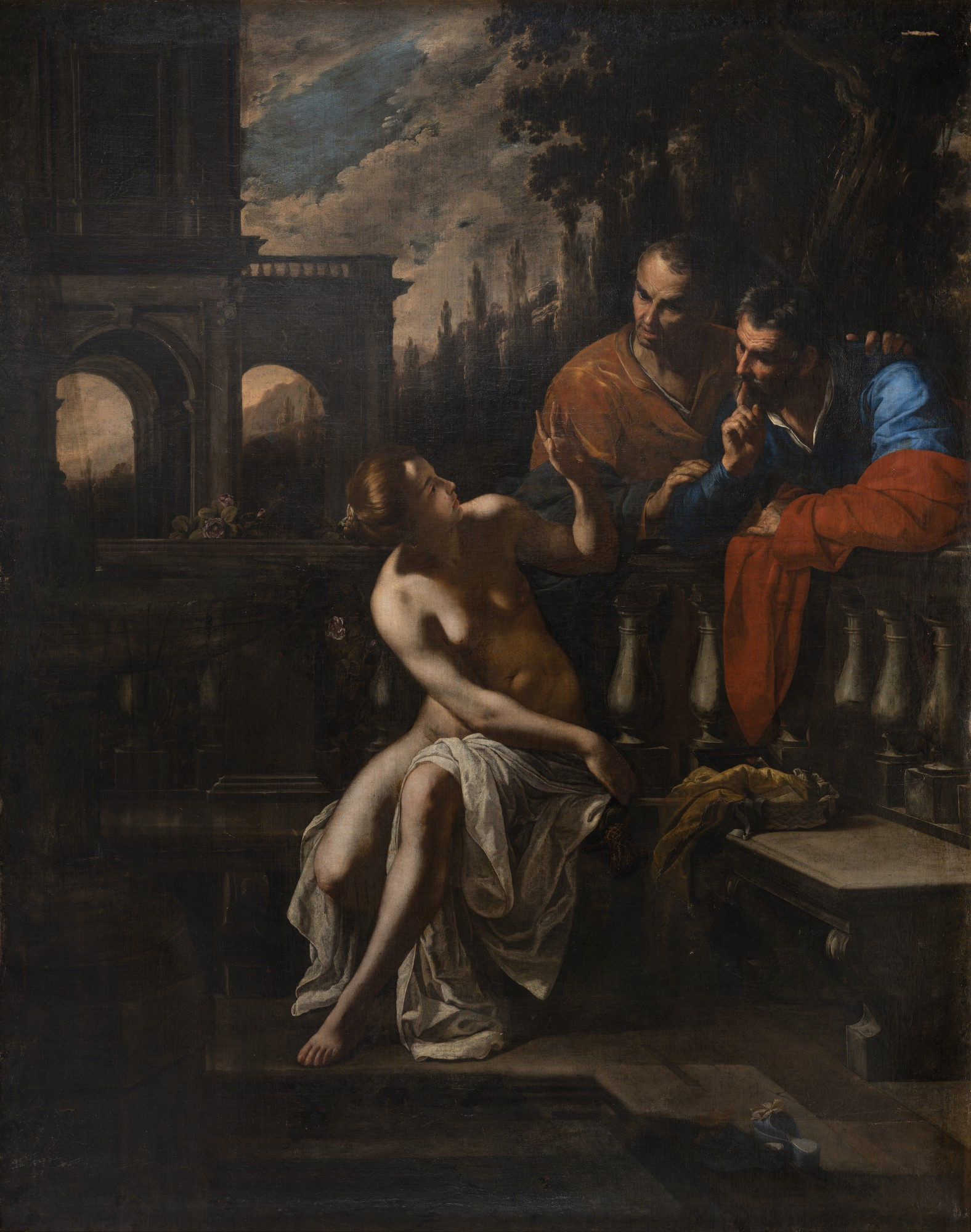
- Artists: Artemisia Gentileschi, Viviano Codazzi, Domenico Gargiulo
- Year: c. 1638
- Dimensions: 265 cm (104 in) × 210 cm (83 in)
- Owner: Jacqui Safra

Susanna and the Elders is a painting by the Italian artist Artemisia Gentileschi, with help from Micco Spadaro (also known as Domenico Gargulio) and Viviano Codazzi. It is one of several paintings composed by Gentileschi on the theme of Susanna being approached by two men while she is washing. The painting was completed in the 1630s while Gentileschi was living in Rome. The architectural backdrop was the work of Codazzi and the landscape by Spadaro.

It was sold at the auction house Sotheby's from the collection of Jacqui Safra in 2022 to an unknown buyer. The cost was US$2,137,500.
