= Syro-Hexaplar version =

The Syro-Hexaplar version (or Syro-Hexapla), siglum Syh, is the Syrian Aramaic (Syriac) translation of the Greek of the Septuagint as found in the fifth column of Origen's Hexapla. The translation was made by Bishop Paul of Tella at the monastery of the Enaton in Egypt around 617.

The Syro-Hexapla was more popular in the West Syrian church than in the Church of the East. Jacob of Edessa used it in his revision of the Peshitta. It was used by the East Syriac scholar Ishodad of Merv in his commentaries.

The Syro-Hexapla is important for the study of the Septuagint, for Henry Swete believed that it often includes the symbols Origen used to mark the differences he observed between the Septuagint text and the Hebrew text. Since many later copies of the Septuagint dropped Origen's symbols, the Syro-Hexapla is one of the primary ways that textual critics can identify Hexaplaric material in the Septuagint.

Being a direct translation from Origen's edition of the Septuagint (with corrections) into Syriac, the Syro-Hexapla should be distinguished from the Peshitta, which is a Syriac translation directly from the Hebrew.

== See also ==
- Syriac versions of the Bible

=== Syro-Hexaplar manuscripts ===
- Codex Ambrosianus C. 313 Inf.
