= Codex Ambrosianus C. 313 Inf. =

The Codex Ambrosianus C. 313 Inf. (also TM 117847, LDAB 117847) is a Syro-Hexaplar manuscript in parchment from the late eight or early ninth-century.

This manuscript contains books from Psalms to Daniel, comprising half of the Old Testament. Andreas Masius reported that the first part of the manuscript, which contained the Pentateuch and the Historical Books, was present at first, but it was lost. The preserved portion contains the books in this order: Pss, Job, Prov, Qoh, Cant, Wis, Sir, MinP, Jer, Bar, Lam, Ep Jer, Dan (with Greek additions: Sus, Bel), Ezek and Isa. This manuscript has been important for the reconstruction of the fifth column of the Origen's Hexapla.

The manuscript has no colophon and is written in Estrangela script. According to Frank E. Shaw, the name of God Iαω consistently renders the Syriac yod-aleph-waw.

A potholithographic edition was published in 1874 by Antonio Maria Ceriani in Codex Syro-Hexaparis Ambrosianus potholithographice editus, and currently is at the Biblioteca Ambrosiana in Milan.
