= Susanna and the Elders (Artemisia Gentileschi, Edinburgh) =

Painting by Artemisia Gentileschi

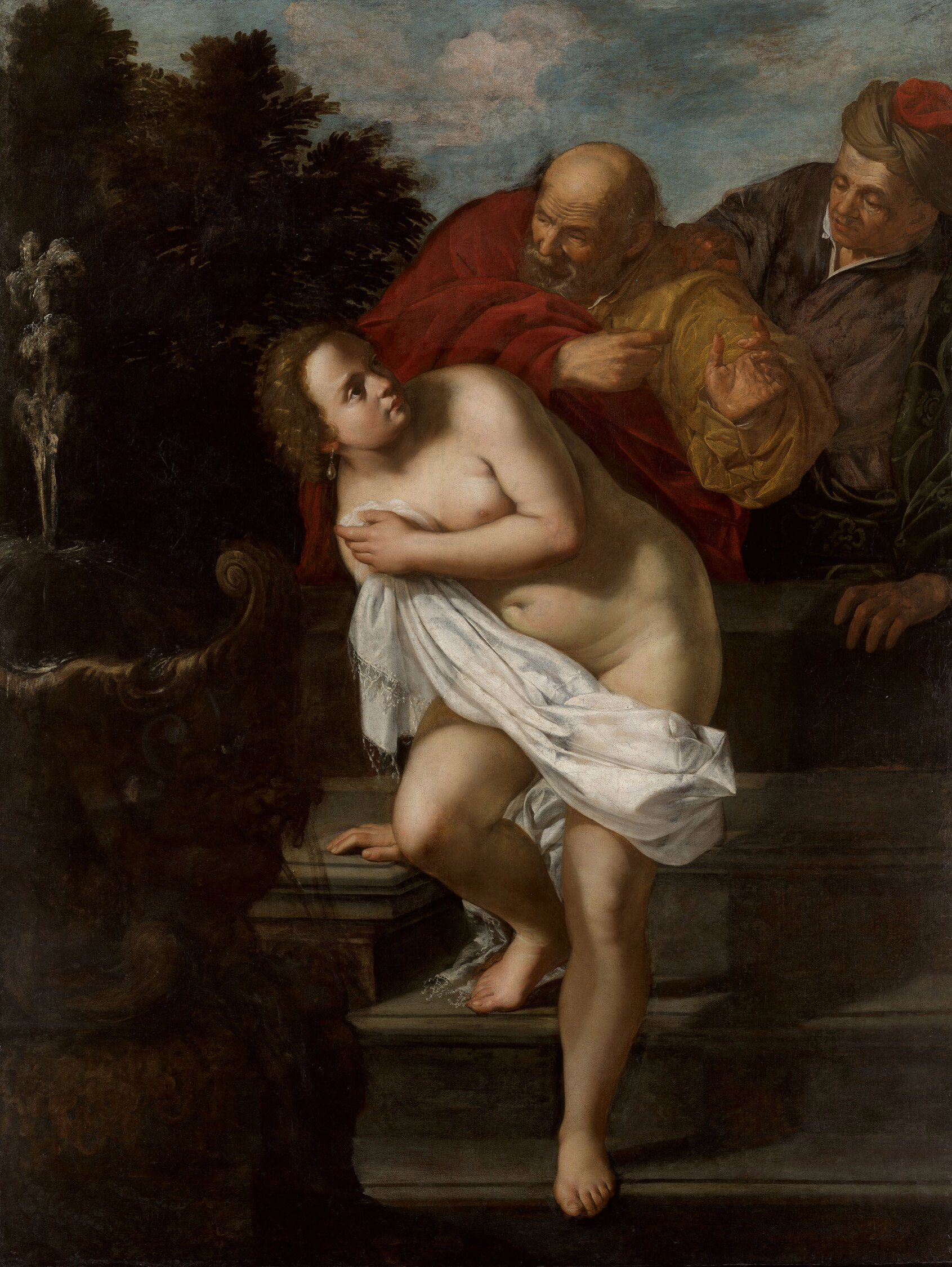
- Artist: Artemisia Gentileschi
- Year: c. 1638–1640
- Medium: Oil on canvas
- Dimensions: 189.0 cm × 143.2 cm (74.4 in × 56.4 in)
- Location: The Queen's House, Greenwich

Susanna and the Elders is a painting by the Italian artist Artemisia Gentileschi in the Royal Collection of the United Kingdom. It is one of many paintings executed by Gentileschi on the theme of Susanna being approached by two men while she is washing. The painting was completed in 1639 while Gentileschi was living in London. Queen Henrietta Maria is likely to have commissioned the work.

The painting was rediscovered as being by Gentileschi after research and restoration in the 2020s. From 2023 to 2024 it was on display at Windsor Castle; as of 2025 it is in Holyrood Palace in Edinburgh.
