= Frederic G. Kenyon =

British palaeographer and classical scholar (1863–1952)

Sir Frederic G. Kenyon GBE KCB TD FBA FSA
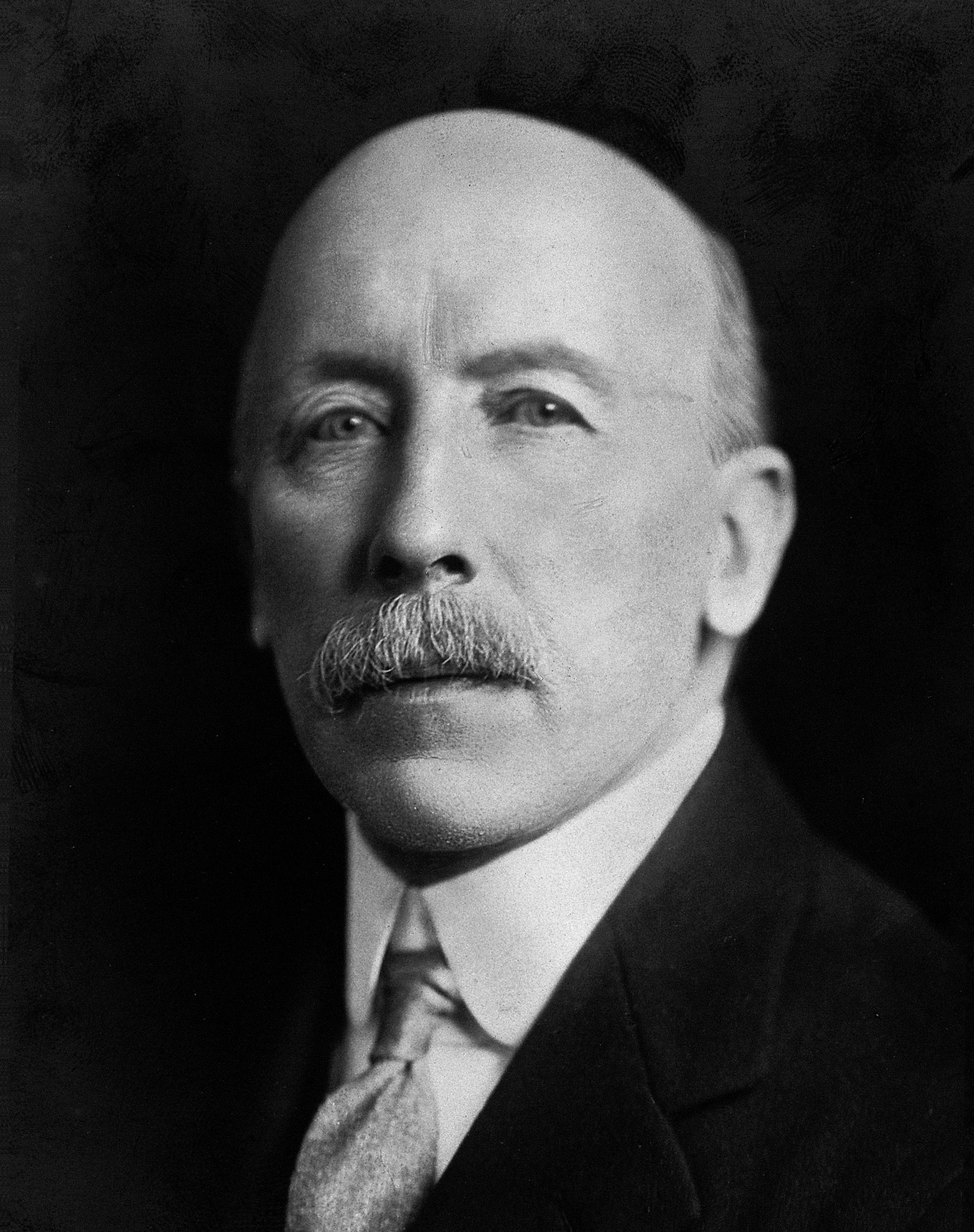
- Born: Frederic George Kenyon; 15 January 1863; London, England
- Died: 23 August 1952 (aged 89); Godstone, Surrey, England

Academic work
- Main interests: Palaeography, Biblical criticism and Classics

Sir Frederic George Kenyon (15 January 1863 – 23 August 1952) was an English palaeographer and biblical and classical scholar. He held a series of posts at the British Museum from 1889 to 1931. He was also the president of the British Academy from 1917 to 1921. From 1918 to 1952 he was Gentleman Usher of the Purple Rod.

== Early life ==
Kenyon was born in London, the son of John Robert Kenyon, the Vinerian Professor of English Law at Oxford, and was thus great-grandson of Lloyd Kenyon, 1st Baron Kenyon. He was educated at Winchester College. He graduated with a first from New College, Oxford in 1886 and became a fellow of Magdalen College.

== Career ==
Kenyon joined the British Museum in 1889 and rose to be its Director and Principal Librarian by 1909. He was knighted for his services in 1912 and remained at his post until 1931. He was elected an International Member of the American Philosophical Society in 1937. He was a trustee of the Imperial War Museum from 1920 to 1946.

In 1891, Kenyon edited the editio princeps of Aristotle's Constitution of Athens. In 1920, he was appointed president of the British School of Archaeology in Jerusalem. He spent most of his retirement researching and publishing ancient papyri. He died on 23 August 1952.

Kenyon was a noted scholar of ancient languages, and made a lifelong study of the Bible, especially the New Testament as an historical text. His book Our Bible and the Ancient Manuscripts (1895) shows one way that Egyptian papyri and other evidence from archaeology can corroborate the narrative of historical events in the Gospels. He was convinced of the historical reality of the events described in the New Testament: “the last foundation for any doubt that the Scriptures have come down to us substantially as they were written has now been removed.”

At the start of the First World War, Kenyon served with the British Expeditionary Force in France to September 1914, then on home service with his regiment the Inns of Court O.T.C. He was promoted major in 1916 and lieutenant-colonel in 1917, retiring in 1921. He was awarded the Territorial Decoration in 1918. In the Second World War he served in the Home Guard from 1940 to 1942. He was an advisor to the Imperial War Graves Commission from 1917 to 1948.

== Personal life ==
Kenyon married Amy, third daughter of Rowland Hunt of Boreatton Hall, Baschurch, Shropshire, by whom he had two daughters. She died in 1938. Kenyon's elder daughter was the British archaeologist Dame Kathleen Kenyon.

From 1899 to 1901 Frederic was Commanding Officer of the Roxeth & Harrow Company of the London Diocesan Church Lads' Brigade.

== Honours ==
Kenyon was appointed a Companion of the Order of the Bath (CB) in the 1911 Coronation Honours, promoted to Knight Companion of the Order (KCB) in the 1912 Birthday Honours, and appointed a Knight Grand Cross of the Order of the British Empire (GBE) in the 1925 Birthday Honours.

== Works ==
- 1891: Ἀριστοτέλους Ἀθηναίων Πολιτεία. Aristotle on the Constitution of Athens; edited by F. G. Kenyon. London: Printed by order of the Trustees of the British Museum
- 1891: Classical Texts from Papyri in the British Museum: Including the Newly Discovered Poems of Herodas, with Autotype Facsimiles of MSS; edited by F. G. Kenyon. London: British Museum.
- 1895: Our Bible and the Ancient Manuscripts, Eyre and Spottiswoode, London, 1896
- 1897: The poems of Bacchylides: from a papyrus in the British Museum; edited by F. G. Kenyon. London: Printed by order of the Trustees of the British Museum
- 1897: The Letters of Elizabeth Barrett Browning; edited with biographical additions by Frederic G. Kenyon. 2 vol. London: John Murray. Gutenberg fulltext
- 1899: The Palaeography of Greek papyri: With Twenty Facsimiles and a Table of Alphabets
- 1900: Facsimiles of Biblical Manuscripts in the British Museum Printed by Order of the Trustees. London.
- 1901: Handbook to the textual criticism of the New Testament (1st ed.)
- 1912: Handbook to the textual criticism of the New Testament (2nd ed.)
- 1914: Aristotle, The Athenian Constitution; translated by Frederic G. Kenyon. London: G. Bell Gutenberg fulltext Wikisource fulltext
- 1915: Codex Alexandrinus in Reduced Photographic Facsimile. London: British Museum. 1909.
- 1927: Ancient Books and Modern Discoveries. Chicago: The Caxton Club.
- 1932: Books and Readers in Ancient Greece and Rome Oxford: Clarendon Press. (2nd ed. 1951)
- 1933: Recent Developments in the Textual Criticism of the Greek Bible (Schweich Lectures for 1932) London: Oxford University Press
- 1933–41: The Chester Beatty Biblical Papyri: Descriptions and Texts of Twelve Manuscripts on Papyrus of the Greek Bible. London: Emery Walker. (See Chester Beatty Papyri)
- 1936: The Story of the Bible: A Popular Account of How It Came to Us London: J. Murray
- 1940: The Bible and Archaeology. London: G. Harrap / New York: Harper & Row
- 1948: The Bible and Modern Scholarship (Ethel M. Wood Lecture) London: J. Murray.
