= Susanna (Book of Daniel) =

Biblical episode and artistic theme

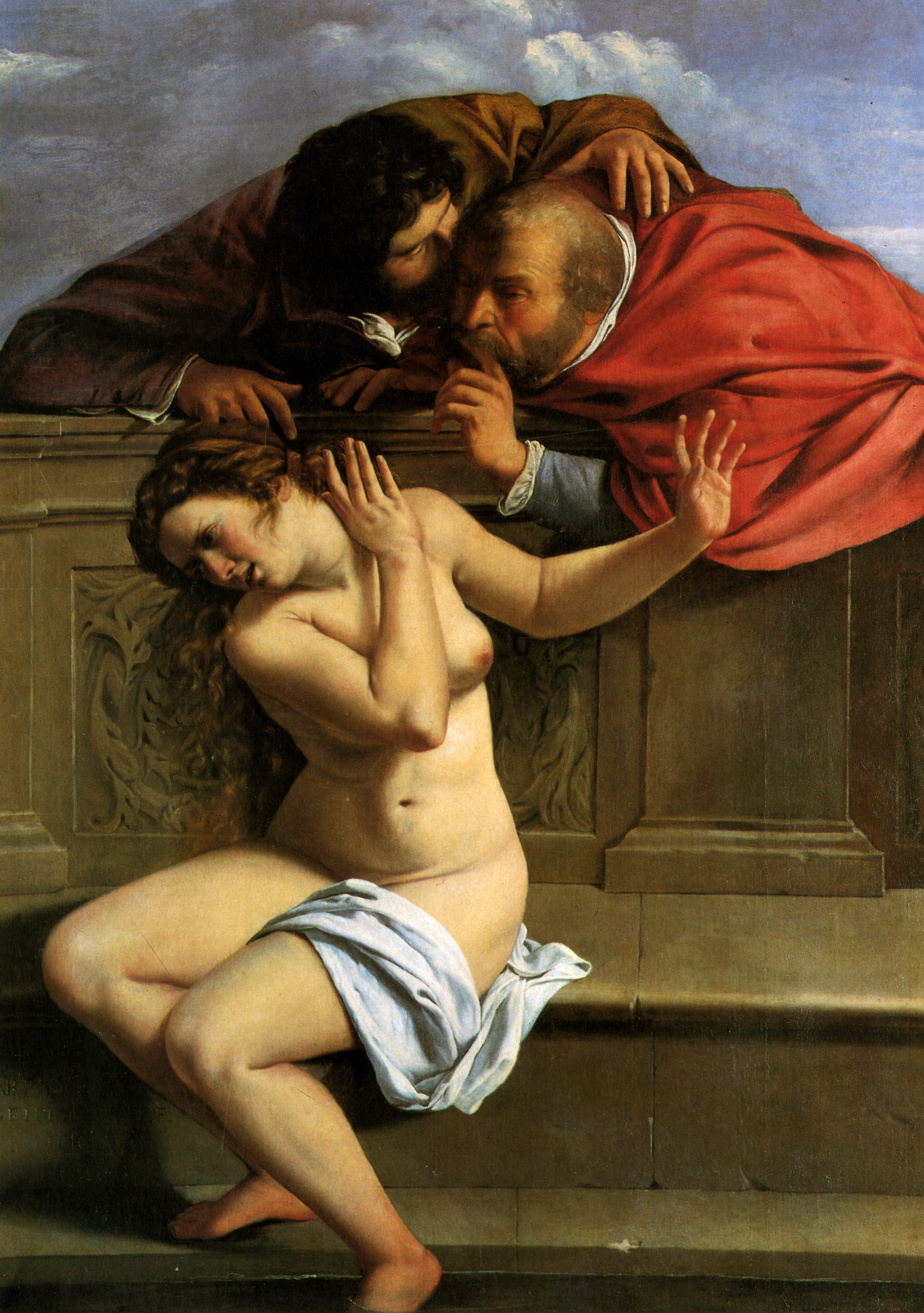
Susanna and the Elders by Artemisia Gentileschi

Susanna (/suːˈzænə/ soo-ZAN-ə; Hebrew: שׁוֹשַׁנָּה, Modern: Shoshána, Tiberian: Šōšannā, lit. 'Lily'), also called Susanna and the Elders, is a narrative included in the Book of Daniel (as chapter 13) by the Catholic Church, Oriental Orthodox Churches, Eastern Orthodox Churches, and the Assyrian Church of the East. It is one of the additions to Daniel, placed in the Apocrypha by Protestants, with Anabaptists, Lutherans, Anglicans and Methodists regarding it as non-canonical but useful for purposes of edification. The text is not included in the Jewish Tanakh and is not mentioned in early Jewish literature, although it does appear to have been part of the original Septuagint from the 2nd century BC, and was revised by Theodotion, a Hellenistic Jewish redactor of the Septuagint text (c. AD 150).

== Summary ==
A fair Hebrew wife named Susanna bathes privately (having sent her attendants away) in her locked and walled garden. Two elders, having previously said goodbye to each other, bump into each other again when they spy on her bathing. The two men realize they both lust for Susanna. When she makes her way back to her house, they accost her, demanding she have sexual intercourse with them. When she refuses, they have her arrested, claiming that the reason she sent her maids away was to be alone as she was having intercourse with a young man under a tree.

She refuses to be blackmailed and is arrested and about to be put to death for adultery when the young Daniel interrupts the proceedings, shouting that the elders should be interrogated to prevent the death of an innocent.

After being separated, the two men are cross-examined in detail about what they saw and contradict each other about the tree under which Susanna supposedly met her lover. In the Greek text, the names of the trees cited by the elders form puns with the sentences given by Daniel. The first says they were under a mastic tree (ὑπο σχίνον, hypo schinon), and Daniel says that an angel stands ready to cut (σχίσει, schisei) him in two. (The pun lies in that the Greek words for “mastic tree” and “to cut” are similar.) The second says they were under an evergreen oak tree (ὑπο πρίνον, hypo prinon), and Daniel says that an angel stands ready to saw (πρίσαι, prisai) him in two. (The pun here lies in that the Greek words for “evergreen oak” and “to split/saw in half” are similar.)

The vast difference in size between a mastic and an oak makes the elders' lie plain to all the observers. The false accusers are put to death, and virtue triumphs.

== Date and textual history ==
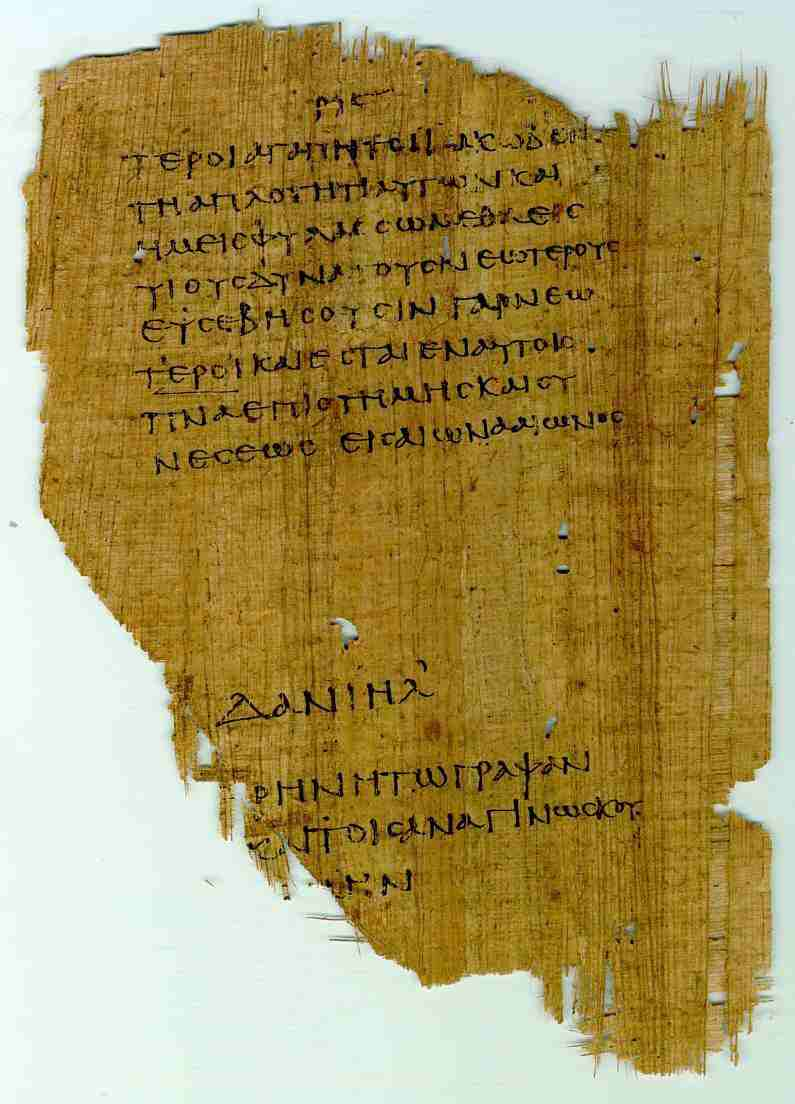
Part of the Septuagint text of the Susanna story as preserved in Papyrus 967 (3rd century).

The Greek text survives in two versions. The received version is due to Theodotion; this has superseded the original Septuagint version, which survives only in Syriac translation, in Papyrus 967 (3rd century AD), and exceptionally in a single medieval manuscript, known as Codex Chisianus 88. The Greek puns in the texts have been cited by some as proof that the text never existed in Hebrew or Aramaic, but other researchers have suggested pairs of words for trees and cutting that sound similar enough to suppose that they could have been used in an original. The Anchor Bible uses "yew" and "hew", and "clove" and "cleave", to get this effect in English.

Sextus Julius Africanus did not regard the story as canonical. Jerome (347–420), while translating the Vulgate, treated this section as a non-canonical fable. In his introduction, he indicated that Susanna was an apocryphal addition because it was not present in the Hebrew text of Daniel. Origen received the story as part of the 'divine books' and censured 'wicked presbyters' who did not recognize its authenticity (Hom Lev 1.3.), remarking that the story was commonly read in the early Church (Letter to Africanus); and claimed the two Elders who had accused Susanna were the false prophets Ahab ben Kolaiah and Zedekiah ben Masseiah, who 'committed adultery with their neighbors' wives' and were executed by king Nebuchadnezzar (Jeremiah 29:21-23); he also noted the story's absence in the Hebrew text, observing (in Epistola ad Africanum) that it was "hidden" by the Jews in some fashion. Origen's claim is reminiscent of Justin Martyr's charge that Jewish scribes 'removed' certain verses from their Scriptures (Dialogue with Trypho: C.71-3). Although omitted from Jewish scripture, the story of Susanna is acknowledged to have been part of Jewish tradition in the Second Temple period.

== Depictions in art ==
The story is portrayed on the Lothair Crystal, an engraved rock crystal made in the Lotharingia region of northwest Europe in the mid 9th century, and is in the British Museum.

The story was frequently painted from about 1470. Susanna is the subject of paintings by many artists, including (but not limited to) Lorenzo Lotto (Susanna and the Elders, 1517), Guido Reni, Rubens, Van Dyck (Susanna and the Elders), Tintoretto, Rembrandt, Tiepolo, and Artemisia Gentileschi (Susanna and the Elders, 1610). Some treatments, especially in the Baroque period, emphasize the drama, others concentrate on the nude; a 19th-century version by Francesco Hayez (National Gallery, London) has no elders visible at all. The Uruguayan painter Juan Manuel Blanes also painted two versions of the story, most notably one where the two voyeurs are not in sight, and Susanna looks to her right with a concerned expression on her face.

In 1681 Alessandro Stradella wrote an oratorio in two parts La Susanna for Francesco II, Duke of Modena, based upon the story.

In 1749, George Frideric Handel wrote an English-language oratorio Susanna.

Susanna (and not Peter Quince) is the subject of the 1915 poem Peter Quince at the Clavier by Wallace Stevens, which has been set to music by the American composer Dominic Argento and by the Canadian Gerald Berg.

American artist Thomas Hart Benton (1889–1975) painted a modern Susanna in 1938, for the de Young Museum in San Francisco. He consciously included pubic hair, unlike the statue-like images of classical art. The fable was set during the Great Depression, and Benton included himself as one of the voyeurs.

The Belgian writer Marnix Gijsen borrows elements of the story in his first novel Het boek van Joachim van Babylon, 1947.

Pablo Picasso, too, rendered the subject in the mid-twentieth century, depicting Susanna much as he depicts his other less abstract reclining nudes. The elders are depicted as paintings hanging on the wall behind her. The picture, painted in 1955, is part of the permanent collection at the Museo Picasso Málaga.

The American opera Susannah by Carlisle Floyd, which takes place in the American South of the 20th century, is also inspired by this story, with the addition of a traveling preacher who seduces Susannah.

Shakespeare refers to this biblical episode in the trial scene of The Merchant of Venice, where Shylock praises Portia as being "A second Daniel" because of her sound judgments, a compliment then taken up by Gratiano when she rules against Shylock. (Note that this story is not part of the Hebrew Book of Daniel, however it is included in the Septuagint, meaning that Shylock should probably be familiar with it.) Shakespeare is assumed to have named his eldest daughter after the biblical character.

The story is also repeated in the One Thousand and One Nights under the name The Devout Woman and the Two Wicked Elders.

Selected works

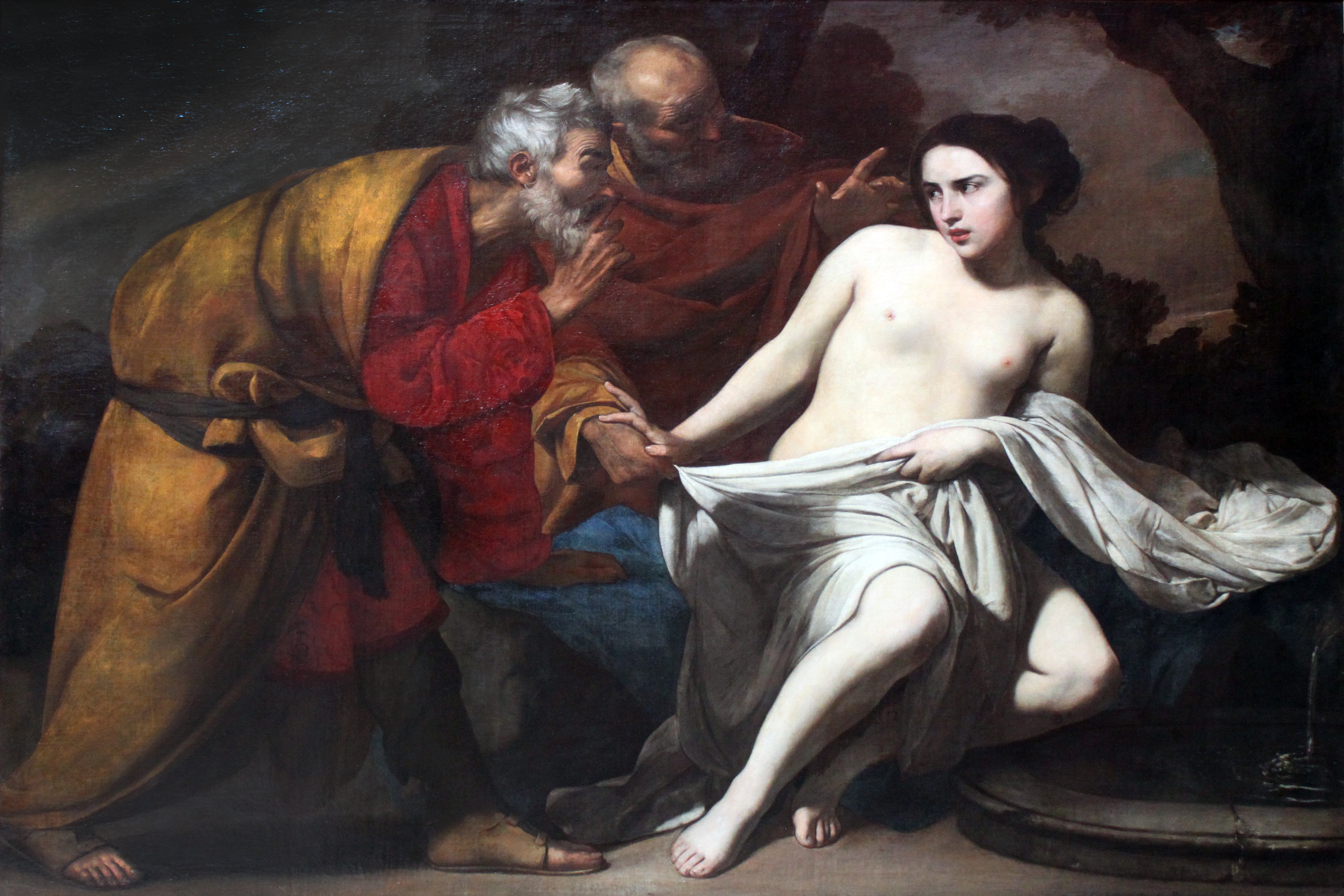
Susannah and the Elders by Massimo Stanzione. Städel

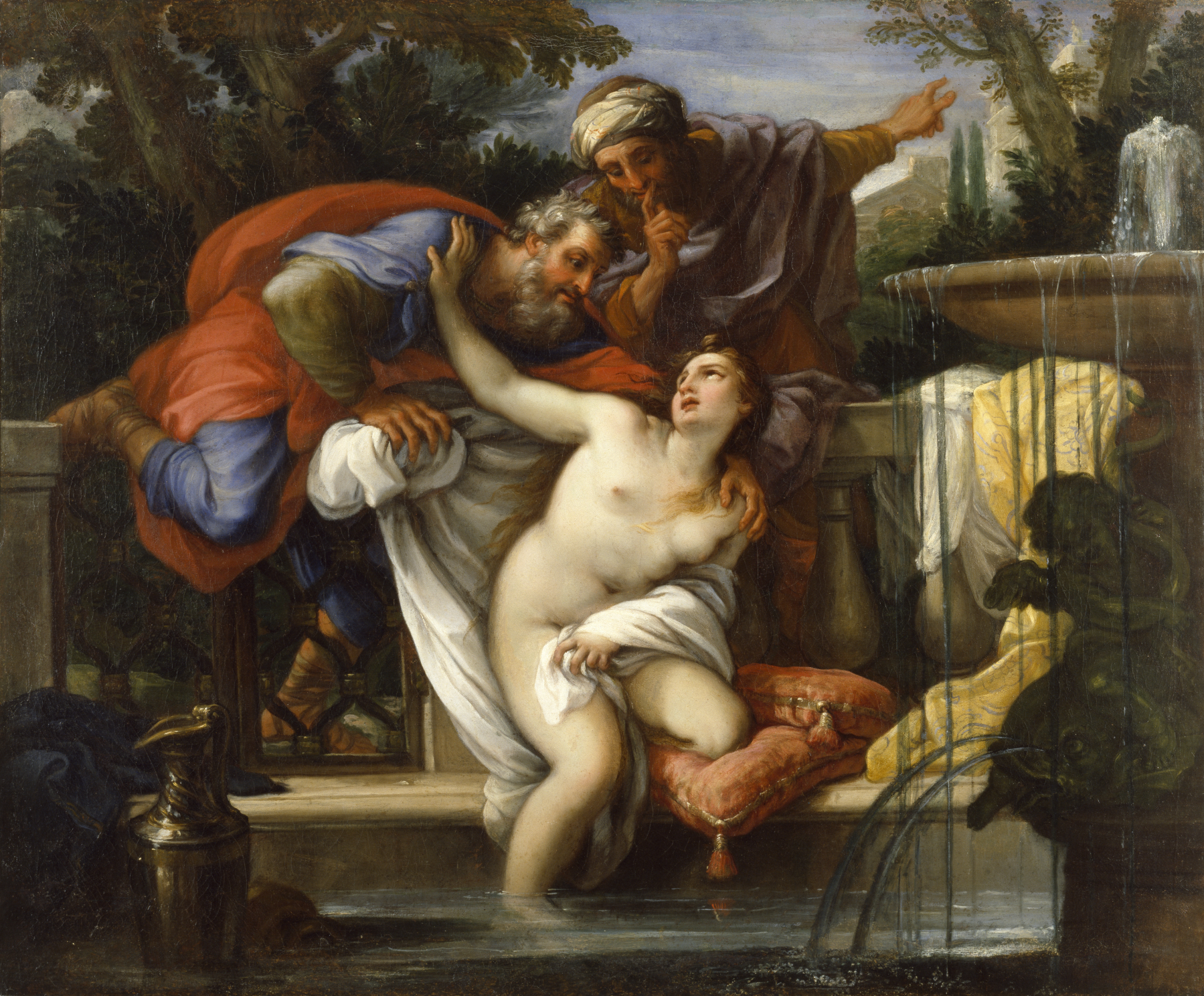
Susannah and the Elders by Giuseppe Bartolomeo Chiari (late Baroque). The Walters Art Museum.

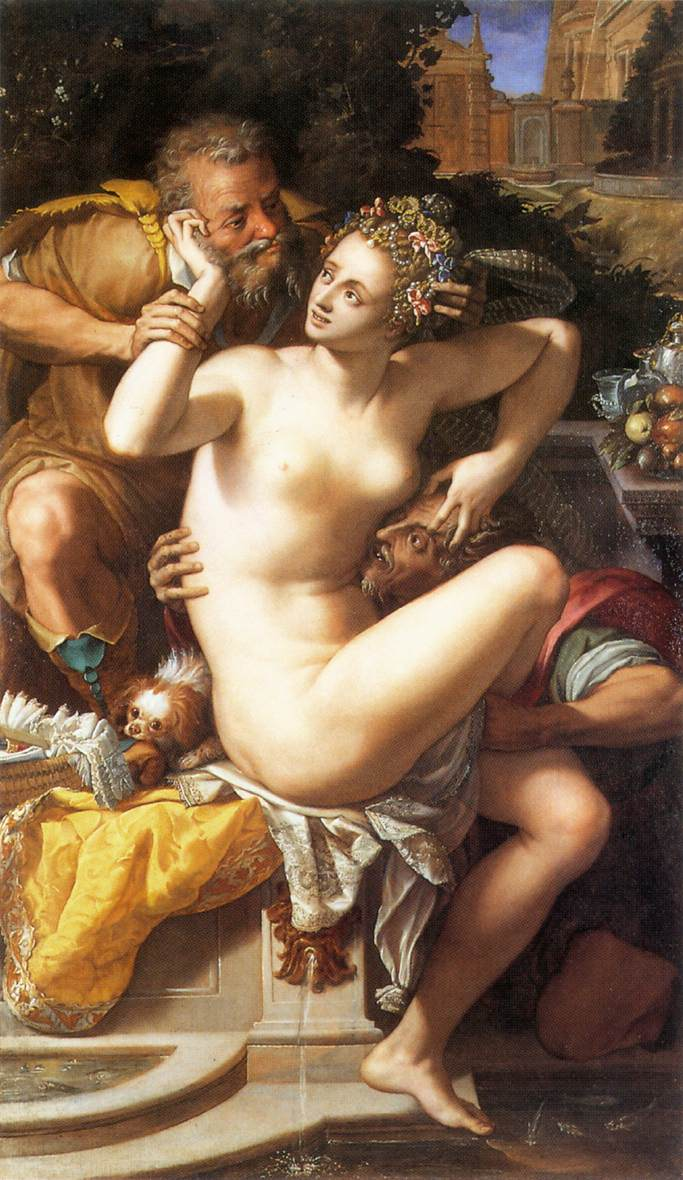
Susanna and the Elders by Alessandro Allori

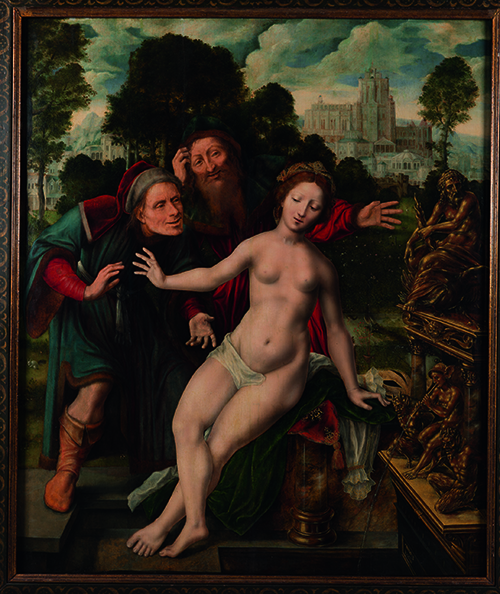
Susannah and the Elders, Jan Matsys, The Phoebus Foundation

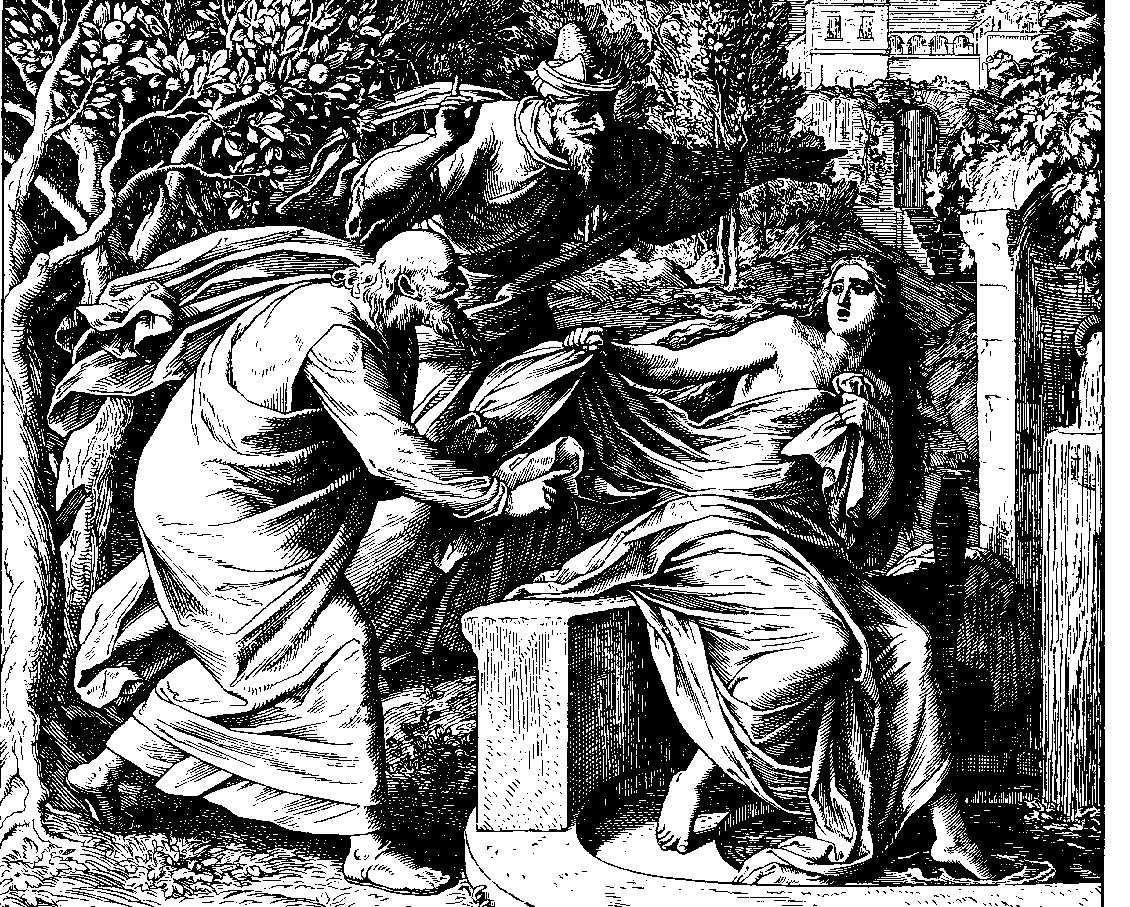
Susanna and Elders, 1860 woodcut by Julius Schnorr von Karolsfeld in Die Bibel in Bildern

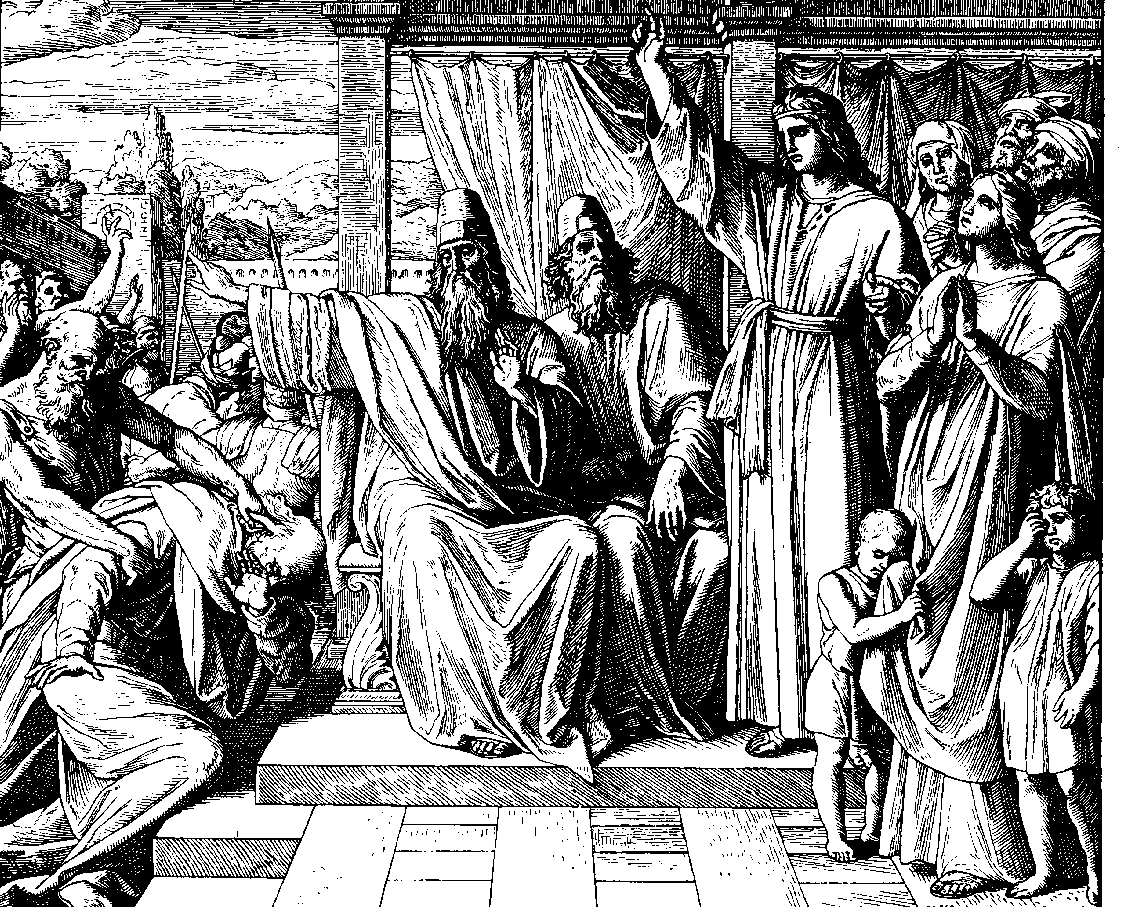
Trial of Susanna, 1860 woodcut by Julius Schnorr von Karolsfeld in Die Bibel in Bildern
