= Berlin Genesis =

Manuscript of the book of Genesis

The Berlin Genesis (Warsaw, University Library), designated as Rahlfs 911, is a 3rd or 4th century manuscript on papyrus. It contains the text of Genesis 1:18-38:5 in Greek. Michael Theophilos says "This manuscript is especially important textually due to the lacuna of Gen. 1:1–46:28a in Vaticanus."
